= 2020 French Senate election =

Senatorial election in France on September 27th, 2020

- 27 September 2020

172 of 348 seats of the Senate 175 seats needed for a majority
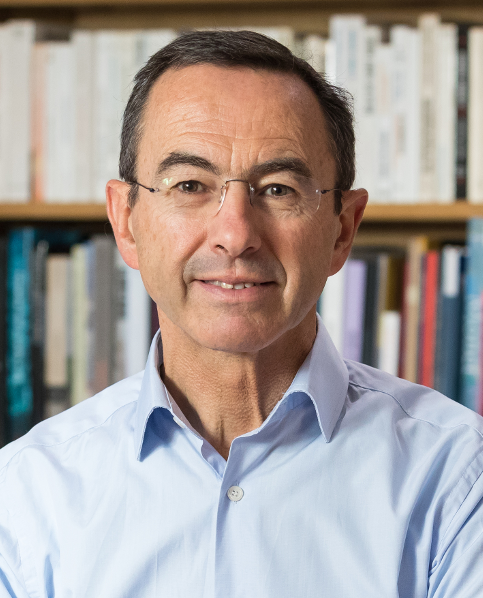

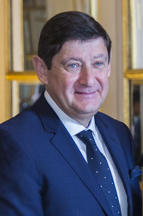

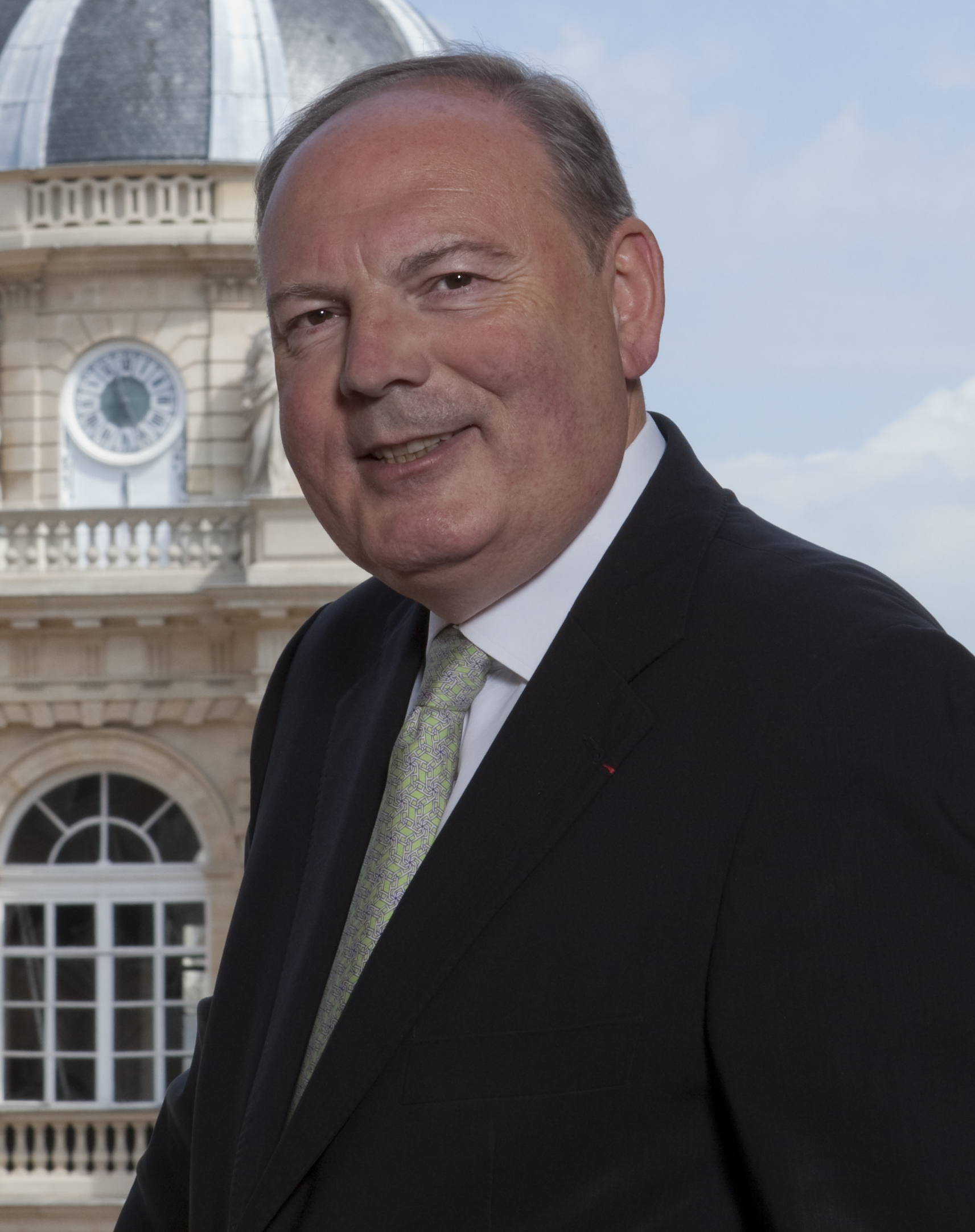

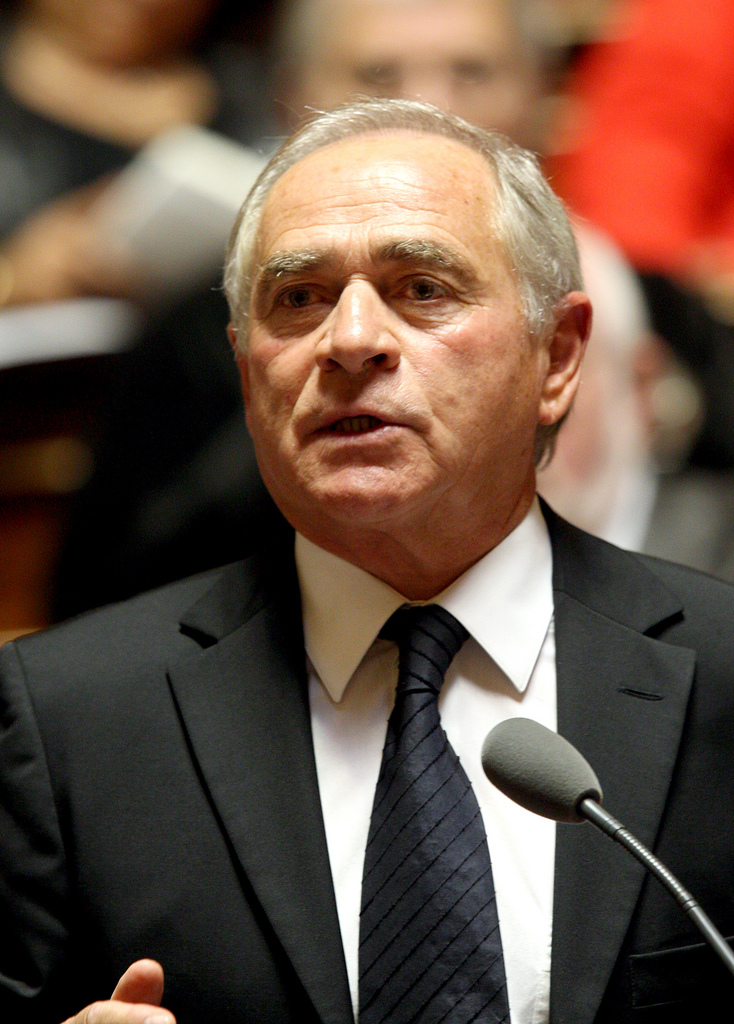

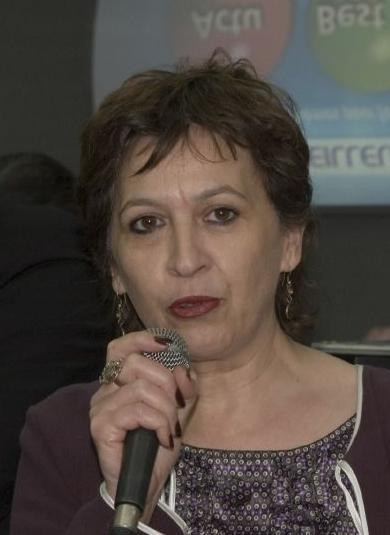

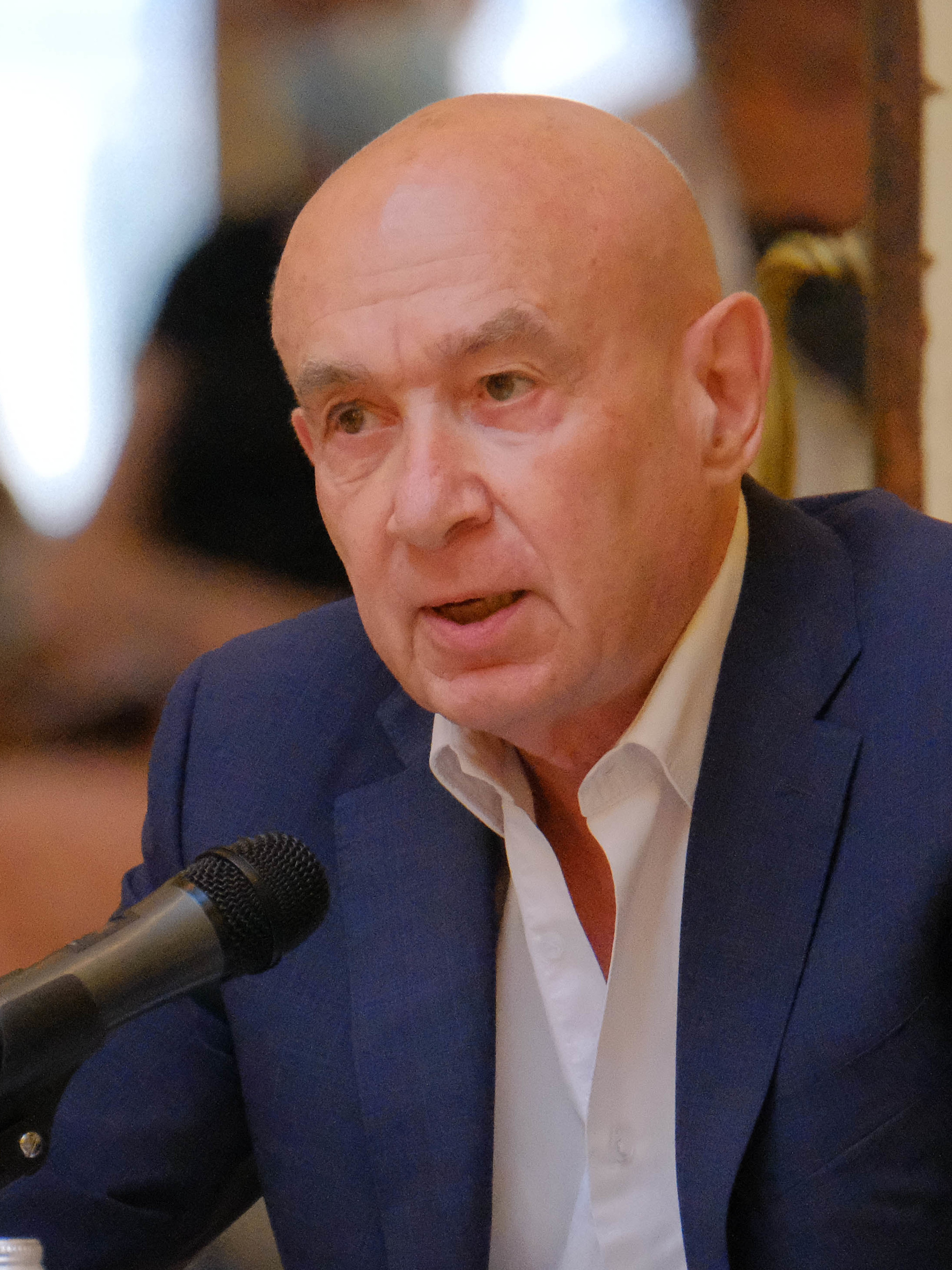

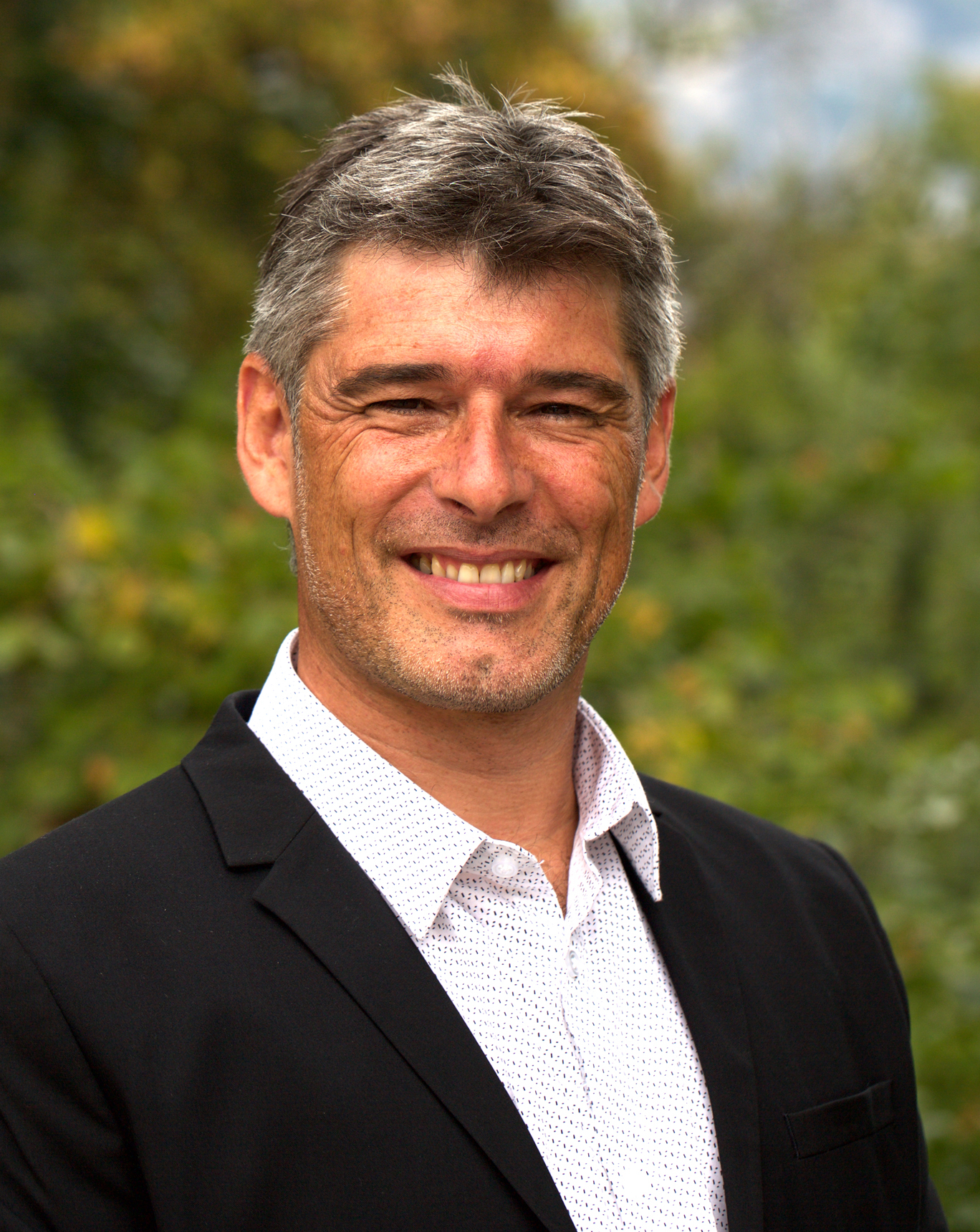
	First party	Second party	Third party
Leader	Bruno Retailleau	Patrick Kanner	Hervé Marseille
Party	LR	SER	UC
Leader's seat	Vendée	Nord	Hauts-de-Seine
Last election	146 seats	78 seats	49 seats
Seats before	144	71	51
Seats after	148	65	54
Seat change	▲2	▼6	▲5
	Fourth party	Fifth party	Sixth party
Leader	François Patriat	Jean-Claude Requier	Éliane Assassi
Party	RDPI	RDSE	CRCE
Leader's seat	Côte-d'Or	Lot	Seine-Saint-Denis
Last election	21 seats	21 seats	15 seats
Seats before	23	24	16
Seats after	23	15	15
Seat change	Steady	▼9	▼1
	Seventh party	Eighth party
Leader	Claude Malhuret	Guillaume Gontard
Party	LIRT	EST
Leader's seat	Allier	Isère
Last election	11 seats	Did not exist
Seats before	13	Did not exist
Seats after	13	12
Seat change	Steady	▲12
President of the Senate before election
Gérard Larcher
LR
Elected President of the Senate
Gérard Larcher
LR

Senatorial elections were held on 27 September 2020 to renew 172 of the 348 seats in the Senate of the French Fifth Republic. The elections were a modest victory for the centre-right Republicans. The environmentalist Europe Ecology – The Greens party entered the upper chamber, while Emmanuel Macron's centrist La République En Marche! party maintained their position, despite losses in the 2020 municipal elections earlier in the year. The far-right National Rally kept their one seat; the Corsican nationalists gained their first seat as well.

== Elected senators ==
Departement	Outgoing senator	Group	Elected senator	Group
Ain	Sylvie Goy-Chavent	RASNAG	Sylvie Goy-Chavent	LR
Ain	Patrick Chaize	LR	Patrick Chaize	LR
Ain	Rachel Mazuir	SOCR	Florence Blatrix-Contat	SER
Aisne	Antoine Lefèvre	LR	Antoine Lefèvre	LR
Aisne	Pascale Gruny	LR	Pascale Gruny	LR
Aisne	Yves Daudigny	SOCR	Pierre-Jean Verzelen	LIRT
Allier	Claude Malhuret	LIRT	Claude Malhuret	LIRT
Allier	Gérard Dériot	LR	Bruno Rojouan	LR
Alpes-de-Haute-Provence	Jean-Yves Roux	RDSE	Jean-Yves Roux	RDSE
Hautes-Alpes	Patricia Morhet-Richaud	LR	Jean-Michel Arnaud	UC
Alpes-Maritimes	Dominique Estrosi Sassone	LR	Dominique Estrosi Sassone	LR
Alpes-Maritimes	Henri Leroy	LR	Henri Leroy	LR
Alpes-Maritimes	Danielle Tubiana	UC	Alexandra Borchio-Fontimp	LR
Alpes-Maritimes	Jean-Pierre Leleux	LR	Philippe Tabarot	LR
Alpes-Maritimes	Marc Daunis	SOCR	Patricia Demas	LR
Ardèche	Mathieu Darnaud	LR	Mathieu Darnaud	LR
Ardèche	Catherine André	LR	Anne Ventalon	LR
Ardennes	Marc Laménie	LR	Marc Laménie	LR
Ardennes	Benoît Huré	LR	Else Joseph	LR
Ariège	Alain Duran	SOCR	Jean-Jacques Michau	SER
Aube	Évelyne Perrot	UC	Évelyne Perrot	UC
Aube	Philippe Adnot	RASNAG	Vanina Paoli-Gagin	LIRT
Aude	Roland Courteau	SOCR	Sébastien Pla	SER
Aude	Gisèle Jourda	SOCR	Gisèle Jourda	SER
Aveyron	Jean-Claude Luche	UC	Jean-Claude Anglars	LR
Aveyron	Alain Marc	LIRT	Alain Marc	LIRT
Bouches-du-Rhône	Stéphane Ravier	RASNAG	Stéphane Ravier	RASNAG
Bouches-du-Rhône	Patrick Boré	LR	Patrick Boré	LR
Bouches-du-Rhône	Anne-Marie Bertrand	LR	Valérie Boyer	LR
Bouches-du-Rhône	Bruno Gilles	LR	Stéphane Le Rudulier	LR
Bouches-du-Rhône	Jean-Noël Guérini	RDSE	Jean-Noël Guérini	RDSE
Bouches-du-Rhône	Michèle Einaudi	SOCR	Marie-Arlette Carlotti	SER
Bouches-du-Rhône	Mireille Jouve	RDSE	Guy Benarroche	GEST
Bouches-du-Rhône	Danièle Garcia	RDSE	Jérémy Bacchi	CRCE
Calvados	Pascal Allizard	LR	Pascal Allizard	LR
Calvados	Sonia de La Provôté	UC	Sonia de La Provôté	UC
Calvados	Corinne Féret	SOCR	Corinne Féret	SER
Cantal	Josiane Costes	RDSE	Stéphane Sautarel	LR
Cantal	Bernard Delcros	UC	Bernard Delcros	UC
Charente	Michel Boutant	SOCR	François Bonneau	UC
Charente	Nicole Bonnefoy	SOCR	Nicole Bonnefoy	SER
Charente-Maritime	Corinne Imbert	LR	Corinne Imbert	LR
Charente-Maritime	Daniel Laurent	LR	Daniel Laurent	LR
Charente-Maritime	Bernard Lalande	SOCR	Mickaël Vallet	SER
Cher	Rémy Pointereau	LR	Rémy Pointereau	LR
Cher	Marie-Pierre Richer	LR	Marie-Pierre Richer	LR
Corrèze	Claude Nougein	LR	Claude Nougein	LR
Corrèze	Daniel Chasseing	LIRT	Daniel Chasseing	LIRT
Haute-Corse	Jacques Castelli	RDSE	Paul-Toussaint Parigi	GEST
Corse-du-Sud	Jean-Jacques Panunzi	LR	Jean-Jacques Panunzi	LR
Côte-d'Or	Alain Houpert	LR	Alain Houpert	LR
Côte-d'Or	Anne-Catherine Loisier	UC	Anne-Catherine Loisier	UC
Côte-d'Or	François Patriat	LREM	François Patriat	RDPI
Côtes-d'Armor	Michel Vaspart	LR	Alain Cadec	LR
Côtes-d'Armor	Yannick Botrel	SOCR	Annie Le Houérou	SER
Côtes-d'Armor	Christine Prunaud	CRCE	Gérard Lahellec	CRCE
Creuse	Éric Jeansannetas	RDSE	Éric Jeansannetas	SER
Creuse	Jean-Jacques Lozach	SOCR	Jean-Jacques Lozach	SER
Dordogne	Claude Bérit-Débat	SOCR	Serge Mérillou	SER
Dordogne	Bernard Cazeau	LREM	Marie-Claude Varaillas	CRCE
Doubs	Jacques Grosperrin	LR	Jacques Grosperrin	LR
Doubs	Jean-François Longeot	UC	Jean-François Longeot	UC
Doubs	Marie-Noëlle Schoeller	SOCR	Annick Jacquemet	UC
Drôme	Gilbert Bouchet	LR	Gilbert Bouchet	LR
Drôme	Bernard Buis	LREM	Bernard Buis	RDPI
Drôme	Marie-Pierre Monier	SOCR	Marie-Pierre Monier	SER
Eure	Ladislas Poniatowski	LR	Kristina Pluchet	LR
Eure	Hervé Maurey	UC	Hervé Maurey	UC
Eure	Nicole Duranton	LR	Sébastien Lecornu	RDPI
Eure-et-Loir	Albéric de Montgolfier	LR	Albéric de Montgolfier	LR
Eure-et-Loir	Chantal Deseyne	LR	Chantal Deseyne	LR
Eure-et-Loir	Françoise Ramond	LR	Daniel Guéret	LR
Finistère	Philippe Paul	LR	Philippe Paul	LR
Finistère	Michel Canévet	UC	Michel Canévet	UC
Finistère	Maryvonne Blondin	SOCR	Nadège Havet	RDPI
Finistère	Jean-Luc Fichet	SOCR	Jean-Luc Fichet	SER
Gard	Vivette Lopez	LR	Vivette Lopez	LR
Gard	Stéphane Cardenes	UC	Laurent Burgoa	LR
Gard	Simon Sutour	SOCR	Denis Bouad	SER
Haute-Garonne	Brigitte Micouleau	LR	Brigitte Micouleau	LR
Haute-Garonne	Alain Chatillon	LR	Alain Chatillon	LR
Haute-Garonne	Pierre Médevielle	LIRT	Pierre Médevielle	LIRT
Haute-Garonne	Françoise Laborde	RDSE	Émilienne Poumirol	SER
Haute-Garonne	Claude Raynal	SOCR	Claude Raynal	SER
Gers	Raymond Vall	RDSE	Alain Duffourg	UC
Gers	Franck Montaugé	SOCR	Franck Montaugé	SER
Gironde	Florence Lassarade	LR	Florence Lassarade	LR
Gironde	Alain Cazabonne	UC	Alain Cazabonne	UC
Gironde	Nathalie Delattre	RDSE	Nathalie Delattre	RDSE
Gironde	Laurence Harribey	SOCR	Laurence Harribey	SER
Gironde	Hervé Gillé	SOCR	Hervé Gillé	SER
Gironde	Françoise Cartron	LREM	Monique de Marco	GEST
Hérault	Jean-Pierre Grand	LR	Jean-Pierre Grand	LR
Hérault	Marie-Thérèse Bruguière	LR	Christian Bilhac	RDSE
Hérault	Henri Cabanel	RDSE	Henri Cabanel	RDSE
Hérault	Agnès Constant	LREM	Hussein Bourgi	SER
Ille-et-Vilaine	Dominique de Legge	LR	Dominique de Legge	LR
Ille-et-Vilaine	Françoise Gatel	UC	Françoise Gatel	UC
Ille-et-Vilaine	Sylvie Robert	SOCR	Sylvie Robert	SER
Ille-et-Vilaine	Jean-Louis Tourenne	SOCR	Daniel Salmon	GEST
Indre	Frédérique Gerbaud	LR	Frédérique Gerbaud	LR
Indre	Jean-François Mayet	LR	Nadine Bellurot	LR
Bas-Rhin	André Reichardt	LR	André Reichardt	LR
Bas-Rhin	Esther Sittler	LR	Laurence Muller-Bronn	LR
Bas-Rhin	Guy-Dominique Kennel	LR	Elsa Schalck	LR
Bas-Rhin	Claude Kern	UC	Claude Kern	UC
Bas-Rhin	Jacques Bigot	SOCR	Jacques Fernique	GEST
Haut-Rhin	René Danesi	LR	Christian Klinger	LR
Haut-Rhin	Catherine Troendlé	LR	Sabine Drexler	LR
Haut-Rhin	Jean-Marie Bockel	UC	Ludovic Haye	RDPI
Haut-Rhin	Patricia Schillinger	LREM	Patricia Schillinger	RDPI
Rhône and Lyon Metropolis	François-Noël Buffet	LR	François-Noël Buffet	LR
Rhône and Lyon Metropolis	Catherine Di Folco	LR	Catherine Di Folco	LR
Rhône and Lyon Metropolis	Michel Forissier	LR	Étienne Blanc	LR
Rhône and Lyon Metropolis	Élisabeth Lamure	LR	Bernard Fialaire	RDSE
Rhône and Lyon Metropolis	Gilbert-Luc Devinaz	SOCR	Gilbert-Luc Devinaz	SER
Rhône and Lyon Metropolis	Michèle Vullien	UC	Thomas Dossus	GEST
Rhône and Lyon Metropolis	Annie Guillemot	SOCR	Raymonde Poncet	GEST
Haute-Saône	Alain Joyandet	LR	Alain Joyandet	LR
Haute-Saône	Michel Raison	LR	Olivier Rietmann	LR
Saône-et-Loire	Marie Mercier	LR	Marie Mercier	LR
Saône-et-Loire	Jean-Paul Emorine	LR	Fabien Genet	LR
Saône-et-Loire	Jérôme Durain	SOCR	Jérôme Durain	SER
Sarthe	Jean-Pierre Vogel	LR	Jean-Pierre Vogel	LR
Sarthe	Louis-Jean de Nicolaÿ	LR	Louis-Jean de Nicolaÿ	LR
Sarthe	Muriel Cabaret	SOCR	Thierry Cozic	SER
Savoie	Martine Berthet	LR	Martine Berthet	LR
Savoie	Jean-Pierre Vial	LR	Cédric Vial	LR
Haute-Savoie	Sylviane Noël	LR	Sylviane Noël	LR
Haute-Savoie	Cyril Pellevat	LR	Cyril Pellevat	LR
Haute-Savoie	Loïc Hervé	UC	Loïc Hervé	UC
Seine-Maritime	Agnès Canayer	LR	Agnès Canayer	LR
Seine-Maritime	Pascal Martin	UC	Pascal Martin	UC
Seine-Maritime	Catherine Morin-Desailly	UC	Catherine Morin-Desailly	UC
Seine-Maritime	Nelly Tocqueville	SOCR	Patrick Chauvet	UC
Seine-Maritime	Didier Marie	SOCR	Didier Marie	SER
Seine-Maritime	Céline Brulin	CRCE	Céline Brulin	CRCE
Deux-Sèvres	Philippe Mouiller	LR	Philippe Mouiller	LR
Deux-Sèvres	Jean-Marie Morisset	LR	Gilbert Favreau	LR
Somme	Jérôme Bignon	LIRT	Laurent Somon	LR
Somme	Daniel Dubois	UC	Stéphane Demilly	UC
Somme	Christian Manable	SOCR	Rémi Cardon	SER
Tarn	Philippe Bonnecarrère	UC	Philippe Bonnecarrère	UC
Tarn	Thierry Carcenac	SOCR	Philippe Folliot	UC
Tarn-et-Garonne	François Bonhomme	LR	François Bonhomme	LR
Tarn-et-Garonne	Yvon Collin	RDSE	Pierre-Antoine Lévi	UC
Var	Claudine Kauffmann	RASNAG	Michel Bonnus	LR
Var	Christine Lanfranchi Dorgal	LR	Françoise Dumont	LR
Var	Georges Ginesta	LR	Jean Bacci	LR
Var	Pierre-Yves Collombat	CRCE	André Guiol	RDSE
Vaucluse	Alain Milon	LR	Alain Milon	LR
Vaucluse	Alain Dufaut	LR	Jean-Baptiste Blanc	LR
Vaucluse	Claude Haut	LREM	Lucien Stanzione	SER
Vendée	Bruno Retailleau	LR	Bruno Retailleau	LR
Vendée	Didier Mandelli	LR	Didier Mandelli	LR
Vendée	Annick Billon	UC	Annick Billon	UC
Vienne	Yves Bouloux	LR	Yves Bouloux	LR
Vienne	Alain Fouché	LIRT	Bruno Belin	LR
Haute-Vienne	Jean-Marc Gabouty	RDSE	Christian Redon-Sarrazy	SOCR
Haute-Vienne	Marie-Françoise Pérol-Dumont	SOCR	Isabelle Briquet	SOCR
Vosges	Daniel Gremillet	LR	Daniel Gremillet	LR
Vosges	Jackie Pierre	LR	Jean Hingray	UC
Yonne	Dominique Vérien	UC	Dominique Vérien	UC
Yonne	Noëlle Rauscent	LREM	Jean-Baptiste Lemoyne	RDPI
Territoire de Belfort	Cédric Perrin	LR	Cédric Perrin	LR
French Guiana	Antoine Karam	LREM	Marie-Laure Phinéra-Horth	RDPI
French Guiana	Georges Patient	LREM	Georges Patient	RDPI
Saint-Barthélemy	Michel Magras	LR	Micheline Jacques	LR
Saint-Martin	Guillaume Arnell	RDSE	Annick Petrus	LR
Wallis and Futuna	Robert Laufoaulu	LIRT	Mikaele Kulimoetoke	RDPI
French Polynesia	Lana Tetuanui	UC	Lana Tetuanui	UC
French Polynesia	Nuihau Laurey	UC	Teva Rohfritsch	RDPI
French citizens living abroad (2021)	Christophe-André Frassa	LR	Christophe-André Frassa	LR
French citizens living abroad (2021)	Jacky Deromedi	LR	Jean-Pierre Bansard	LR
French citizens living abroad (2021)	Olivier Cadic	UC	Olivier Cadic	UC
French citizens living abroad (2021)	Richard Yung	LREM	Samantha Cazebonne	RDPI
French citizens living abroad (2021)	Claudine Lepage	SOCR	Yan Chantrel	SER
French citizens living abroad (2021)	Robert del Picchia	LR	Mélanie Vogel	GEST
