= Barnier government =

Government of France from September to December 2024

- 45th Government of French Fifth Republic
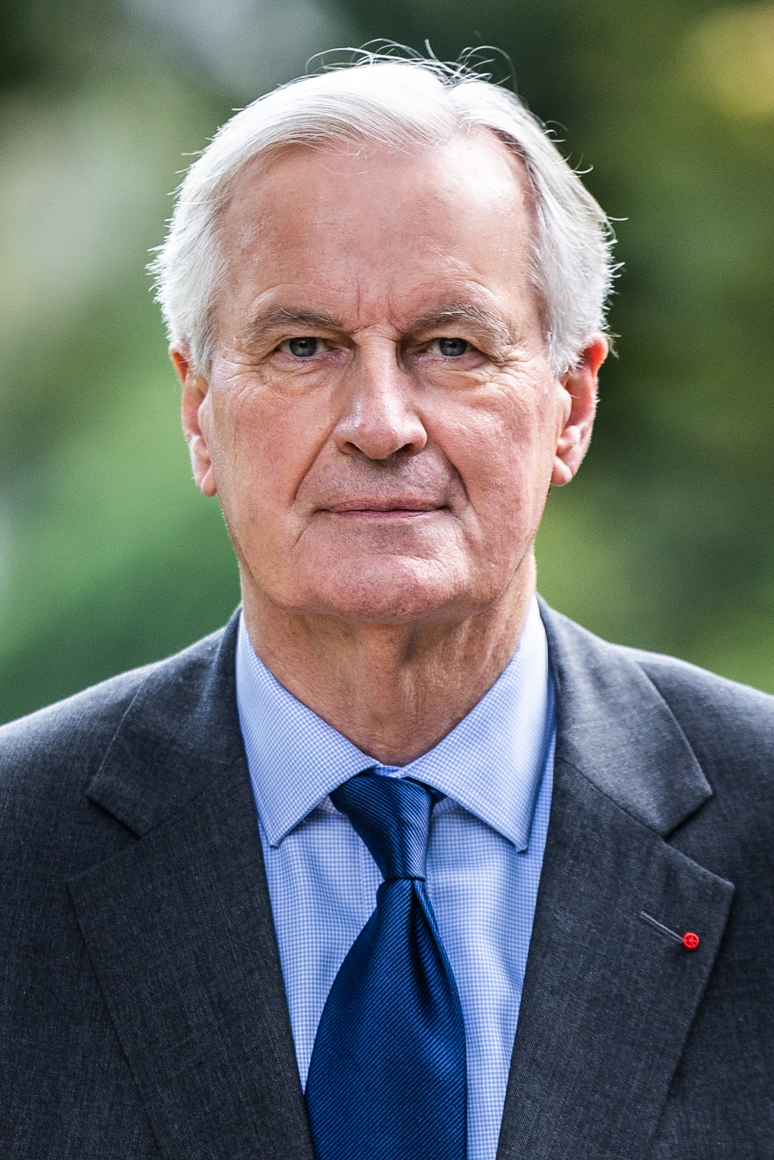
- Date formed: 5 September 2024
- Date dissolved: 13 December 2024

People and organisations
- President of the Republic: Emmanuel Macron
- Prime Minister: Michel Barnier
- No. of ministers: 42 (Note: Does not include the Prime Minister.)
- Member parties: RE; LR; MoDem; HOR; UDI; PR
- Status in legislature: Minority (coalition)

History
- Election: 2024 French legislative election
- Predecessor: Attal government
- Successor: Bayrou government

The Barnier government (French: gouvernement Barnier) was the 45th government of France during the period of the French Fifth Republic. It was formed in September 2024 after President Emmanuel Macron appointed Michel Barnier as Prime Minister on 5 September, replacing Gabriel Attal. It was a caretaker government from 5 December until its dissolution on 13 December 2024.

On 5 September, Barnier was invited by Emmanuel Macron to "form a unity government". With only 212 out of 577 seats in the National Assembly, the centre-right coalition began as one of the smallest minority governments in French history, having to rely in the lower house on support or neutrality from other parties, including the National Rally. It taking office also marked the first time under the Fifth Republic a government had a legislative majority in the Senate, but not in the National Assembly.

On 4 December 2024, the Barnier government collapsed after the National Assembly passed a motion of no confidence in a 331–244 vote. It was the first French government to be toppled by Parliament since 1962. Following the vote, Barnier and his government resigned the following day and continued as caretaker government until a new government was formed.

== Formation ==
=== Context ===
After the dissolution of the 16th legislature by Macron on 9 June 2024, the early legislative election took place on 30 June and 7 July. While the National Rally was originally anticipated to obtain a majority or plurality, it came third in seats behind the New Popular Front and Ensemble.

Prime Minister Gabriel Attal, having only served six months in office, offered his resignation to Macron, who accepted it on 16 July. The day before the opening of the Paris Olympic Games, the New Popular Front designated Lucie Castets to be its candidate for the premiership. In reaction, arguing that "no one won [the elections]", Macron announced the holding of consultations to form a government.

On 16 August, at the end of the Olympic Games, Macron invited party leaders and presidents of parliamentary groups from both chambers to the Palais de l'Élysée on 23 August to try to form a government. After the President met the party leaders and the presidents of parliamentary groups, Macron's office announced in a press release on 26 August that Castets would not be appointed prime minister.

On 2 September, Emmanuel Macron met with Bernard Cazeneuve, former Socialist Prime Minister from 2016 to 2017, and Xavier Bertrand, current Hauts-de-France region president, as they were touted as top contenders for the premiership. Faced with the risk of a successful vote of no confidence, the appointment of Michel Barnier was considered on 4 September. On 5 September, almost two months after the second round of legislative elections, Macron appointed him as PM. While the NFP announced it would move a motion of no confidence against any government not led by them, the National Rally announced that it would wait for the general policy statement of the new government before deciding whether to support any motions of no confidence.

Barnier's appointment was met with ire from the NFP and its supporters, who claimed that Macron's appointment of a conservative PM favorable to Macron's centrist policies was unrepresentative of the voting results, and amounted to a "denial of democracy". Left-wing parties called on their members to join the nationwide demonstrations, with the Socialist Party being the only main alliance member of the NFP to not explicitly call on its supporters to participate. Protests were held on 7 September 2024. According to organizers, roughly 300,000 participated, with about 160,000 protesting in Paris. France's Interior Ministry estimated that there were 110,000 nationwide protesters, with 26,000 in Paris.

On 9 October, the Barnier government survived a no-confidence vote brought by the New Popular Front, which fell 92 votes short of the 289 needed. The National Rally allowed the government to survive the motion by abstaining from the vote.

== Collapse ==
In mid-October 2024, Barnier presented his government's proposal for the 2025 government budget to the National Assembly. Focused on reducing the budget deficit, the proposal included a wide range of austerity measures, including forty billion euros of spending cuts and twenty billion euros of tax increases.

The budget proposal received significant criticism from the left, with Socialist Party leader Olivier Faure accusing Barnier of "turning towards the far-right to avoid a no-confidence vote."

On 2 December, Barnier pushed through a social security financing bill, using Article 49.3, which allows a vote of no confidence. A motion of no confidence was called by the New Popular Front and the National Rally resulting in the collapse of the government.

The motion was debated on 4 December. In his closing remarks, Barnier claimed that it had been "an honor for me to have served France and the French with dignity" and that a no confidence vote would "make everything more serious and more difficult."

The motion passed 331–244, toppling the government three months after its formation and making it the shortest-lived government in the history of the French Fifth Republic. It was also the first French government to lose a motion of no-confidence since Georges Pompidou's in 1962.

=== Vote ===
Motion of no confidence
Ballot →	4 December 2024
Required majority →	288 out of 575 ✓
Votes in favour: • RN (123); • LFI (71); • SOC (65); • ECO (38); • GDR (16); • UDR (16); • LIOT (1); • NI (1)	331 / 575
Abstentions or absentees (Note: In the French National Assembly, motions of no confidence are voted on by open ballot, with only those in favor of the motion taking part in the vote. Since a majority of the entire membership is required, those who are absent or do not cast a ballot are de facto voting against.)	244 / 575

Ultimately, 331 deputies, a majority of the National Assembly, voted for no confidence in the government.

All deputies belonging to the left-wing alliance voted in favor, except for Sophie Pantel and Julien Brugerolles. 123 of the 124 National Rally deputies also voted in favour (with Sophie Blanc not voting), as did all UDR deputies.

Caledonian Union deputy Emmanuel Tjibaou did not participate.

=== Reactions ===
==== Financial ====
Moody's Ratings warned that the government's collapse "deepens the country's political stalemate" and "reduces the probability of a consolidation of public finances."

==== Political commentators ====
Author Éric Brunet described the collapse as "jaw-droppingly French," saying that there was "no pragmatism. Just ideology. All the speeches were about values, about extremes. Our whole discourse is disconnected from reality." Simon Toubeau of the University of Nottingham described the collapse as a "persistence of the competitive and majoritarian instincts of France's politicians that engendered this crisis," adding that while Macron was "content to partner with the others to keep the RN out of power, these noble sentiments evaporated when it came to governing."

==== Politicians ====
Republican politician and minister of the interior in the Barnier government Bruno Retailleau stated that the right "cannot make a compromise with the left" in forming a new government.

National Rally leader Marine Le Pen stated that she did not want Macron to resign, but called on him to "respect the voice of voters and show respect for political forces and respect for elections."

Senator Anne Souyris of The Ecologists stated that the collapse proved that Macron "has not taken stock of what is happening" in France.

==== Unions and NGOs ====
General Confederation of Labour secretary general Sophie Binet claimed that Macron's "supply-side policy is leading us into a wall. It is a catastrophe, an economic and social disaster."

== Composition ==
Barnier's ministers were named on 21 September, formed of centrists and conservatives. All ministers are placed in the order of precedence defined by the Order of the Protocol defined by the Elysée when the government was announced.

=== Ministers ===
Portfolio	Name	Party
Prime Minister	Michel Barnier	LR
Minister for Justice	Didier Migaud	SE
Minister for Territorial Partnerships and Decentralization	Catherine Vautrin	RE
Minister of the Interior	Bruno Retailleau	LR
Minister of National Education	Anne Genetet	RE
Minister for Europe and Foreign Affairs	Jean-Noël Barrot	MoDem
Minister for Culture	Rachida Dati	SE
Minister of the Armed Forces	Sébastien Lecornu	RE
Minister of Ecological Transition, Energy, Climate, and Risk Prevention	Agnès Pannier-Runacher	RE
Minister of Economy, Finances and Industry	Antoine Armand	RE
Minister of Health and Access to Care	Geneviève Darrieussecq	MoDem
Minister of Solidarity, Autonomy, and Gender Equality	Paul Christophe	HOR
Minister of Housing and Urban Renovation	Valérie Létard	UDI
Minister of Agriculture, Food Sovereignty, and Forestry	Annie Genevard	LR
Minister of Labour and Employment	Astrid Panosyan-Bouvet	RE
Minister of Sports, Youth and Community Life	Gil Avérous	SE
Minister of Higher Education and Research	Patrick Hetzel	LR
Minister of Civil Service, Streamlining, and Public Sector Transformation	Guillaume Kasbarian	RE

=== Deputy Ministers ===
Portfolio	Attached minister	Name	Party
Minister for Europe	Prime Minister and Minister for Europe and Foreign Affairs	Benjamin Haddad	RE
Minister to the Prime Minister, Minister of the Overseas	Prime Minister	François-Noël Buffet	LR
Minister to the Prime Minister, Minister of the Budget and Public Accounts	Prime Minister	Laurent Saint-Martin	RE
Spokeswoman of the Government	Prime Minister	Maud Bregeon	RE
Minister for Relations with Parliament	Prime Minister	Nathalie Delattre	PR
Minister for Government Coordination	Prime Minister	Marie-Claire Carrère-Gée	LR
Minister for Rural Affairs, Trade and Crafts	Minister for Territorial Partnerships and Decentralization	Françoise Gatel	UDI
Minister of Transport	Minister for Territorial Partnerships and Decentralization	François Durovray	LR
Minister of the Sea	Minister for Territorial Partnerships and Decentralization	Fabrice Loher	UDI
Minister for Daily Security	Minister of the Interior	Nicolas Daragon	LR
Minister of Veterans Affairs	Minister of the Armed Forces	Jean-Louis Thiériot	LR
Minister for Academic Achievement and Vocational Education	Minister of National Education	Alexandre Portier	LR
Minister for Foreign Trade and the French Abroad	Minister for Europe and Foreign Affairs	Sophie Primas	LR
Associate Minister for Industry	Minister of Economy, Finances and Industry	Marc Ferracci	RE
Minister for Social and Solidarity Economy, Interest and Participation	Minister of Economy, Finances and Industry	Marie-Agnès Poussier-Winsback	HOR
Minister of Tourism	Minister of Economy, Finances and Industry	Marina Ferrari	MoDem
Minister responsible for energy	Minister of Ecological Transition, Energy, Climate, and Risk Prevention	Olga Givernet	RE
Minister for Family and Early Childhood	Minister of Solidarity, Autonomy, and Gender Equality	Agnès Canayer	SE
Minister for Persons with Disabilities	Minister of Solidarity, Autonomy, and Gender Equality	Charlotte Parmentier-Lecocq	HOR

=== Secretary of State ===
Portfolio	Attached minister	Name	Party
State Secretary for Citizenship and Anti-Discrimination	Minister of the Interior	Othman Nasrou	LR
Secretary of State for Francophonie and International Partnerships	Minister for Europe and Foreign Affairs	Thani Mohamed Soilihi	RE
State Secretary for Consumer Affairs	Minister of Economy, Finances and Industry	Laurence Garnier	LR
Secretary of State for Equality between women and men	Minister of Solidarity, Autonomy, and Equality between women and men	Salima Saa	SE
Secretary of State for Artificial Intelligence and Digital Technologies	Minister of Higher Education and Research	Clara Chappaz	SE

== Aftermath ==
On 5 December, over 130,000 public sector workers held a one-day strike in protest against Barnier's budget proposal, with the aim of warning Macron that doubling-down on the proposed austerity measures would cause further unrest.

At 19:00 that day, Macron gave a televised speech addressing the government's collapse. In the speech, Macron vowed to stay in office until the end of his term in 2027, to name a new prime minister shortly, and to present an emergency law to ensure taxes could still be collected and a government shutdown avoided in the new year. He also accused the National Rally and the New Popular Front of uniting in an "anti-republican front," saying that "they chose disorder."
