= Nathalie Delattre =

French politician (born 1968)

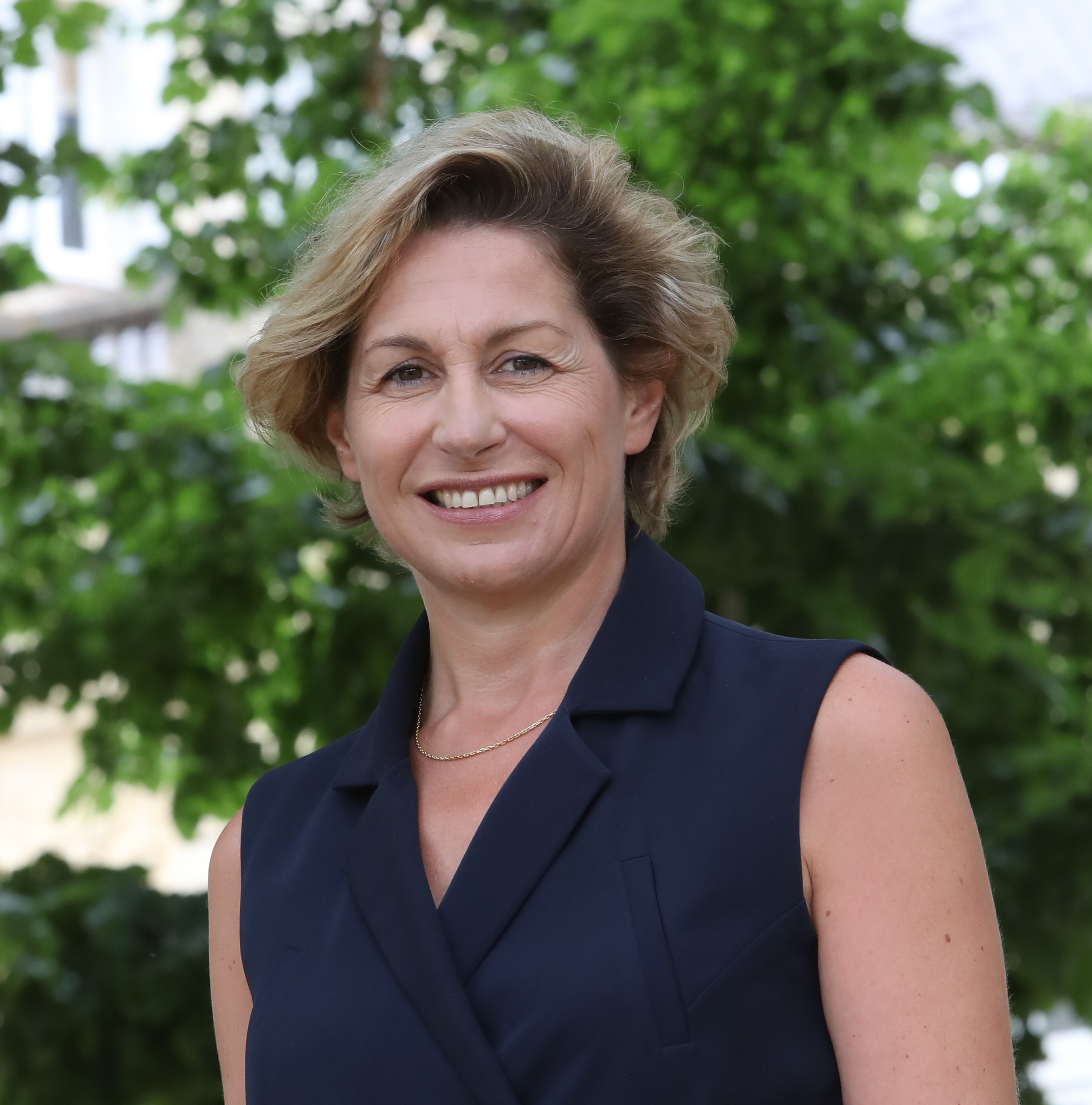
- Delattre in 2017

Minister Delegate for Tourism
- In office 23 December 2024 – 5 October 2025
- Prime Minister: François Bayrou
- Preceded by: Marina Ferrari

President of the Radical Party
- Incumbent
- Assumed office 28 September 2024
- Preceded by: Laurent Hénart

Minister Delegate for Relations with Parliament
- In office 21 September 2024 – 23 December 2024
- Prime Minister: Michel Barnier
- Preceded by: Marie Lebec
- Succeeded by: Patrick Mignola

Senator for Gironde
- In office 1 October 2017 – 21 October 2024
- Preceded by: Xavier Pintat
- Succeeded by: Mireille Conte-Jaubert

Member of the Regional Council of Nouvelle-Aquitaine
- In office 13 December 2015 – 23 October 2017

Personal details
- Born: 2 December 1968 (age 57) Aubervilliers, France
- Party: Radical Party (1989–present)
- Other political affiliations: Union for French Democracy (1989–2002); Union of Democrats and Independents (2012–2017); Radical Movement (2017–2021)

Nathalie Delattre (French: [natali dəlatʁ]; born 2 December 1968) is a French politician who served as Minister Delegate for Tourism in the government of Prime Minister François Bayrou from December 2024 to October 2025. She has also presided over the Radical Party since September 2024. From September to December 2024, Delattre briefly served as Minister Delegate for Relations with Parliament in the government of Prime Minister Michel Barnier. Prior to her appointment to the government, she was a Senator for Gironde from 2017 to 2024.

== Political career ==
Delattre has been a municipal councillor of Bordeaux since 2008.

Delattre first became a member of the Senate in the 2017 elections, and was re-elected in 2020. During her time in the Senate, she held several important positions, including as vice-president under the leadership of president Gérard Larcher (2020-2023) and as vice-president of the Committee on Legal Affairs.

== Political positions ==
Delattre is an active support of the wine lobby, and a declared opponent to the Dry January initiative.
