= Botrel =

Botrel, Bothrel, Botherel or Bothorel a Breton surname, and may refer to:

Boterel means toad in Old French. Probably a nickname given to a person who used to have swollen cheeks.

- Éric Bothorel, French politician
- Théodore Botrel, Breton singer-songwriter, poet and playwright
- Yannick Botrel, French politician
