= Clara Chappaz =

French politician (born 1989)

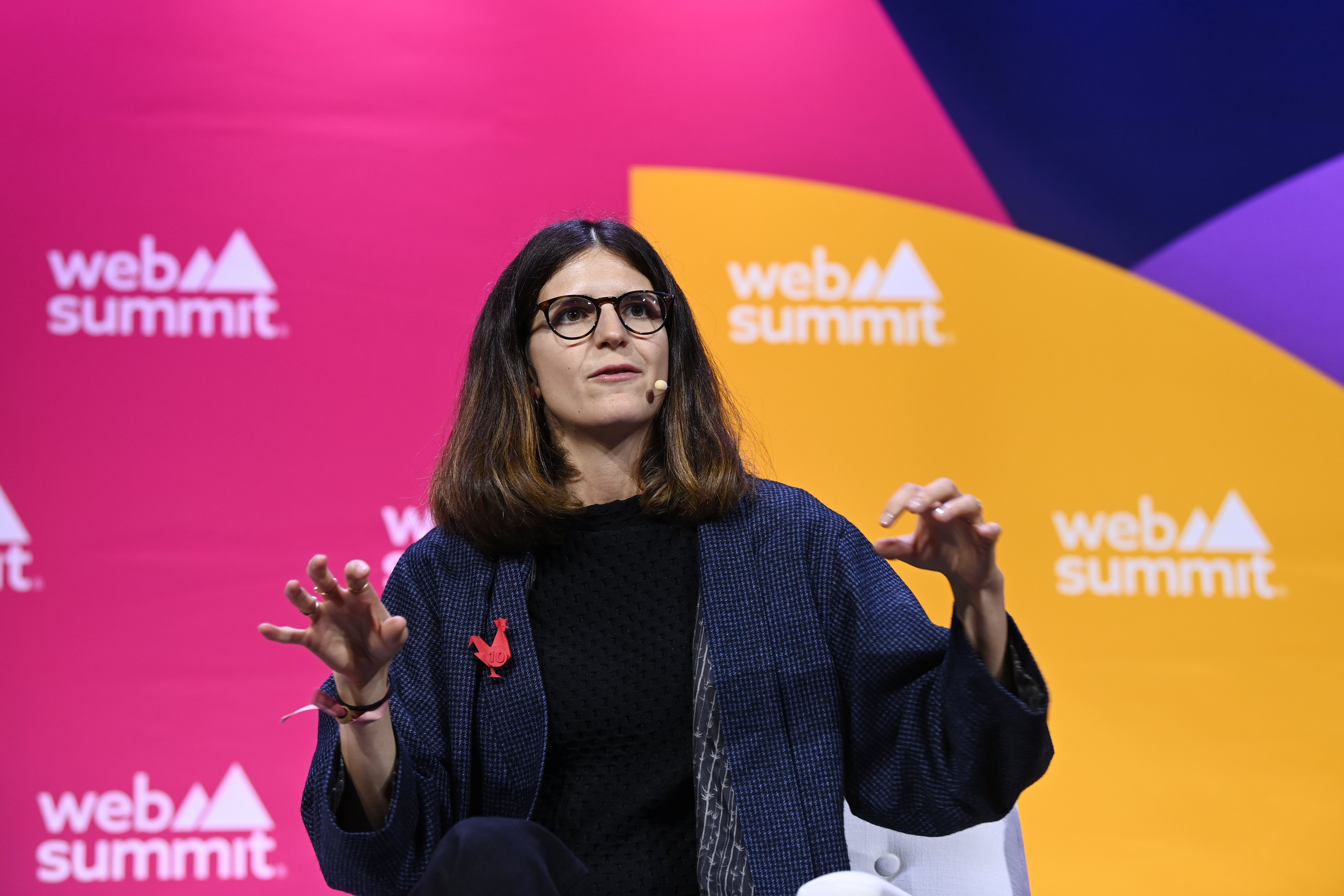
- Chappaz in 2023

Minister Delegate for Artificial Intelligence and Digital Technologies (Note: as Secretary of State from 21 September to 23 December 2024)
- In office 21 September 2024 – 5 October 2025
- Prime Minister: Michel Barnier; François Bayrou
- Preceded by: Marina Ferrari
- Succeeded by: Naïma Moutchou

Personal details
- Born: 14 June 1989 (age 37)
- Education: ESSEC Business School (MS); Harvard Business School (MBA)

Clara Chappaz (born 14 June 1989) is a French politician who served as Minister Delegate for artificial intelligence and digital technologies in the successive government of Prime Ministers Michel Barnier and François Bayrou from 2024 to 2025.

== Career ==
From 2021 to 2024, Chappaz served as director of French Tech, and from 2019 to 2021, she was a director of Vestiaire Collective. She previously served as director general of Zalora, starting in 2015.

On 21 September 2024, she became secretary of state for artificial intelligence and digital technologies in the government of Michel Barnier. On 21 October 2024, while in office, she gave birth to her second child.

After the Barnier government was toppled by a motion of no confidence, she retained her portfolio in the government of François Bayrou on 23 December 2024, while being promoted as a Minister Delegate.
