= Pierre-Jean Verzelen =

French politician

Member of the French Senate for Aisne
- Incumbent
- Assumed office 2020
- Preceded by: Yves Daudigny

Mayor of Crécy-sur-Serre
- In office 30 October 2020 – 28 March 2014

Personal details
- Born: 29 August 1983 (age 41)
- Political party: Republican

Pierre-Jean Verzelen (born 29 August 1983) is a French politician from The Republicans. He was elected Senator for Aisne on 27 September 2020.
