= Anne-Catherine Loisier =

French politician (born 1969)

Senator for Côte-d'Or
- Incumbent
- Assumed office 1 October 2014

Mayor of Saulieu
- In office 21 March 2008 – 16 October 2017
- Preceded by: Patrice Vappereau
- Succeeded by: Jean-Philippe Meslin

Personal details
- Born: 13 March 1969 (age 57) Cayenne, French Guiana
- Party: Union of Democrats and Independents

Anne-Catherine Loisier (French pronunciation: [ankatʁin lwazje]; born 13 March 1969) is a French politician who has served as a Senator for Côte-d'Or since 2014. A member of the Union of Democrats and Independents (UDI), she sits with the Centrist Union group in the Senate. From 2008 to 2017, she served as mayor of Saulieu.

In 2014 and 2020, Loisier was second on the Union of the Right and Centre list led by Alain Houpert in the Senate election. She previously served as the member of the General Council of Côte-d'Or for the canton of Saulieu (1994–2014) and a member of the Regional Council of Burgundy (1998–2010).
