= Catherine Vautrin =

French politician (born 1960)

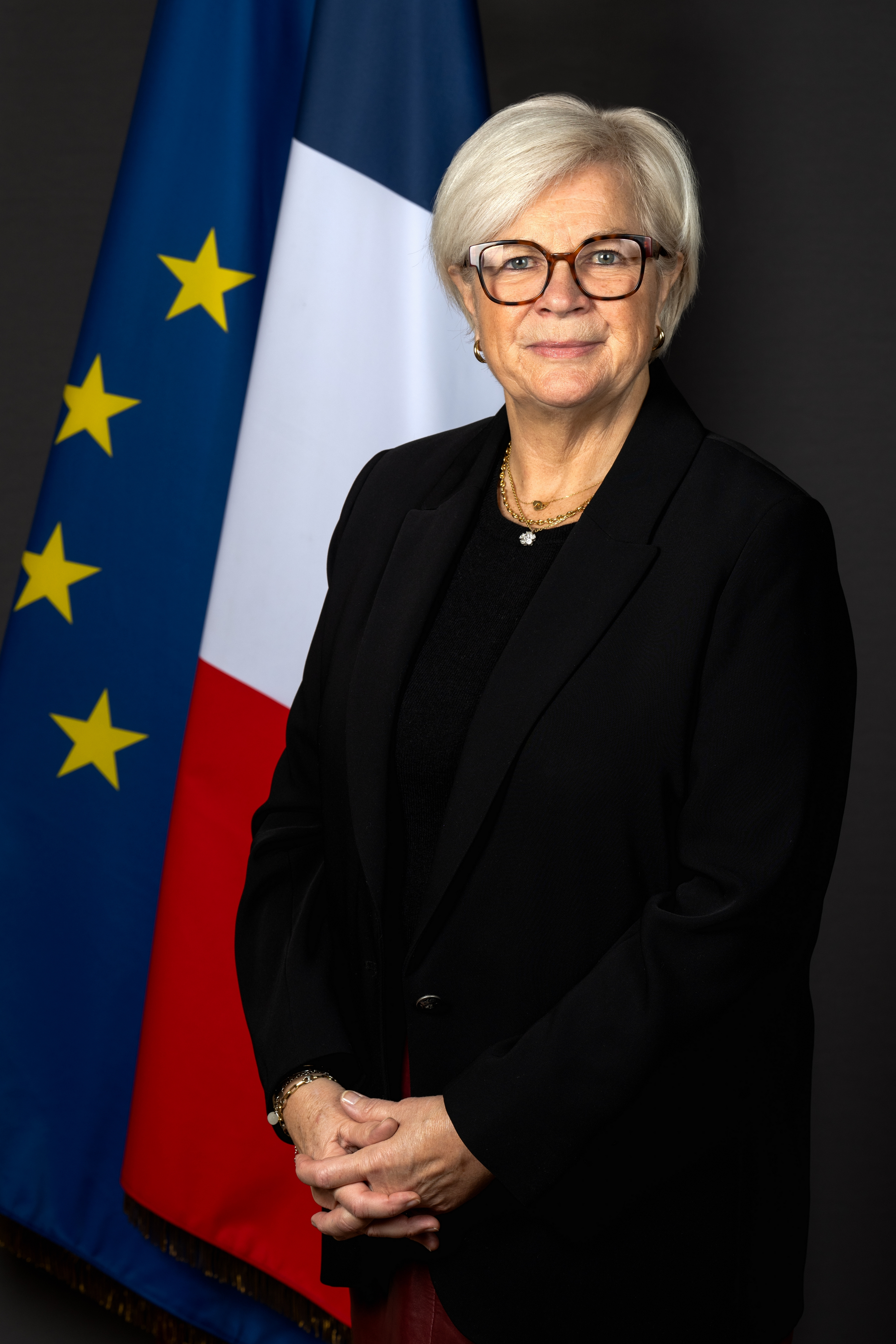

Minister of the Armed Forces and Veterans Affairs
- Incumbent
- Assumed office 12 October 2025
- Prime Minister: Sébastien Lecornu
- Preceded by: Sébastien Lecornu (interim); Bruno Le Maire

Minister of Labour, Health, Solidarity and Families
- In office 23 December 2024 – 12 October 2025
- Prime Minister: François Bayrou; Sébastien Lecornu
- Preceded by: Astrid Panosyan (Labour); Geneviève Darrieussecq (Health); Paul Christophe (Solidarity); Agnès Canayer (Families)
- Succeeded by: Jean-Pierre Farandou (Labour, Solidarity); Stéphanie Rist (Health, Families)
- In office 11 January 2024 – 21 September 2024 (Note: Minister of Labour, Health, and Solidarity.)
- Prime Minister: Gabriel Attal
- Preceded by: Olivier Dussopt (Labour); Agnès Firmin-Le Bodo (Health); Aurore Bergé (Solidarity)
- Succeeded by: Astrid Panosyan (Labour); Geneviève Darrieussecq (Health); Paul Christophe (Solidarity)

Minister of Partnership with Territories and Decentralization
- In office 21 September 2024 – 23 December 2024
- Prime Minister: Michel Barnier
- Preceded by: Christophe Béchu (Ecological Transition and Territorial Cohesion); Caroline Cayeux (Relations with Local Authorities)
- Succeeded by: François Rebsamen

Minister Delegate for Social Cohesion and Parity
- In office 2 June 2005 – 15 May 2007
- Prime Minister: Dominique de Villepin
- Preceded by: Nelly Olin (Social Cohesion); Nicole Ameline (Parity)
- Succeeded by: Najat Vallaud-Belkacem

Vice President of the National Assembly
- In office 26 September 2008 – 20 June 2017
- President: Bernard Accoyer; Claude Bartolone

Member of the National Assembly for Marne's 2nd constituency
- In office 20 June 2007 – 20 June 2017
- Preceded by: Philippe Feneuil
- Succeeded by: Aina Kuric
- In office 19 June 2002 – 30 April 2004
- Preceded by: Jean-Claude Étienne
- Succeeded by: Philippe Feneuil

President of Grand Reims
- In office 14 April 2014 – 16 January 2024
- Preceded by: Adeline Hazan
- Succeeded by: Arnaud Robinet

Personal details
- Born: 26 July 1960 (age 66) Reims, France
- Party: Renaissance (2024–present)
- Other political affiliations: RPR (1980–2002); UMP (2002–2015); LR (2015–2019); Independent (2019–2024)
- Spouse: Jean-Louis Pennaforte (m. 2001)
- Children: 1
- Education: Paris Descartes University

Catherine Vautrin (French pronunciation: [katʁin votʁɛ̃]; born 26 July 1960) is a French politician who has been serving as Minister of the Armed Forces since 2025. She previously served as the Minister of Labour, Health, Solidarity, and Families in the successive governments of Prime Ministers François Bayrou and Sébastien Lecornu from 2024 to 2025.

Vautrin briefly served as Minister of Partnership with Territories and Decentralization in the Barnier government from September to December 2024 and as Minister of Labour, Health, and Solidarity in the Attal government from January to September 2024. Vautrin represented the 2nd constituency of Marne in the National Assembly from 2002 to 2004 and 2007 to 2017.

== Early life and career ==
Vautrin was born in Reims. Her husband, Jean-Loup Pennaforte, whom she married in 2001, is chief of internal medicine at the University Hospital of Reims. They have a daughter, Hortense, born in 2002.

Vautrin holds a Master of Business Law. In 1986, she began her professional career as a product manager at the American insurance company CIGNA, after which she became director of marketing and communications in France and across Europe.

== Political career ==
In 1983, at the request of Jean Falala, Vautrin became a municipal councilor in the city of Reims. At the time, she was the youngest of the team. In 1999, she left her job in the private sector to join the Regional Council of Champagne-Ardenne, where she served as Deputy Director General in charge of directions and operational services.

=== Member of the National Assembly, 2002–2004 ===
In the 2002 elections, Vautrin became a member of the National Assembly, representing the second district of the Marne and succeeding Jean-Claude Etienne. In parliament, she was a member of the Committee on Economic Affairs, as such, she was:

- Member of la commission sur l'avenir aéroportuaire français (the Commission on the future French airports)
- First Vice-President of the mission for the study of economic and social consequences of the legislation on working time
- Secretary to the Committee on Economic Affairs and the Committee on the Budget of the Economy, Finance and Industry (post and telecommunications)
- Secretary of the project on the law concerning economic initiative

=== Career in government, 2004–2007 ===
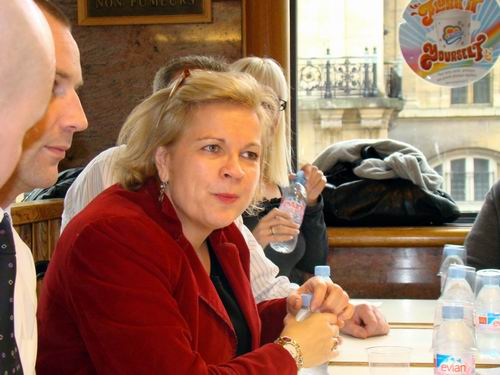
Catherine Vautrin, February 2008.

During the presidency of Jacques Chirac, on 31 March 2004, Vautrin was appointed Secretary of State for Integration and Equal Opportunities under minister Jean-Louis Borloo in the government of Prime Minister Jean-Pierre Raffarin. On October 28, 2004, she became Secretary of State for Seniors.

From June 2, 2005, Vautrin served as Minister Delegate for Social Cohesion and Parity in the government of Prime Minister Dominique de Villepin. In this capacity, she led efforts in 2005 to introduce French-language tests for immigrants applying for a 10-year residence permit. After a feud between the government and aid group Médecins du Monde that had been distributing tents to homeless people across Paris in August 2005, she pledged 7 million euros to help 1,000 homeless people get off the city's streets by offering them long-term housing specially adapted to their needs.

In April 2006, Vautrian was elected president of the Federation of the UMP. She was also appointed President of Communication and Initiative Marne, club Jean-Pierre Raffarin, of which she was a member of the National Office.

=== Member of the National Assembly, 2007–2017 ===
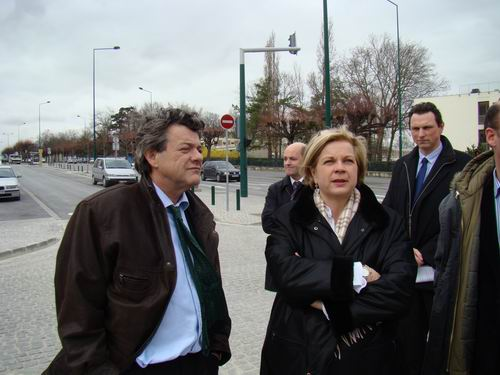
Catherine Vautrin and Jean-Louis Borloo, March 2008.

In the 2007 elections, Vautrin was re-elected with 56.93% of the vote. In the National Assembly, she was elected vice-president of the Commission of Economic Affairs. She was a board member of the UMP in the National Assembly, under the leadership of the group's chair Jean-François Copé.

On July 6, 2007, Vautrin officially announced her candidacy for mayor of Reims, in the context of French municipal elections of 2008. After the first round, March 9, 2008, Vautrin obtained 25.19% of the vote. She campaigned in the second round against the candidate of the Left Union Adeline Hazan, obtaining 43.93% of the vote despite the UMP nomination (given in the first round Renaud Dutreil), and was elected councilor of the opposition.

On June 25, 2008, Vautrin was designated by the members of the UMP group to become, as of October 2008, vice-president of the National Assembly, replacing Marc-Philippe Daubresse, whose peers did not re-elect him.

On January 28, 2010, Vautrin was named president of the French Commission for the Examination of Unfair Commercial Practices, replacing Jean-Paul Charié, who had died.

Vautrin advanced to the 1st Vice-President of the Assembly when Marc Laffineur was appointed to government in June 2011. In 2012, after switching to the left of the National Assembly, Laurence Dumont succeeded her as First Vice-President, and she was appointed the fifth vice-president.

At the UMP's 2012 congress, Vautrin supported the motion Gaullism, a way forward for France, led by Michèle Alliot-Marie, Roger Karoutchi, Henri Guaino, and Patrick Ollier. In December 2012, following the resignation of Dominique Dord, she was appointed national treasurer of the UMP under the leadership of the party's chair Jean-François Copé.

In 2015, Vautrin and Monique Rabin co-authored a report on the financing of consular missions.

Vautrin was one of the MPs who lost their seat in the 2017 French legislative election.

=== President of Grand Reims, 2014–2024 ===
From 2014 to 2024, Vautrin served as president of Grand Reims.

Ahead of the Republicans' 2016 primaries, Vautrin managed former president Nicolas Sarkozy's campaign for the presidential nomination, alongside Éric Ciotti; Sarkozy eventually lost against François Fillon. Amid the Fillon affair, she later called on Fillon to resign as the party's candidate.

In the run-up to the 2022 presidential elections, Vautrin endorsed incumbent President Emmanuel Macron for re-election.

Following the 2022 legislative elections, Vautrin was considered by national news media a contender to succeed Jean Castex as Prime Minister of France.

As part of an inquiry into UMP fundraising efforts that began in late 2014, Vautrin was formally placed under investigation in April 2015 on suspicion of illicit funding.

=== Career in government, 2024–present ===
On 11 January 2024, Vautrin was named Minister of Labour, Health and Solidarity in the government of Prime Minister Gabriel Attal. Her return to national politics was widely seen as a move by Macron to broaden his government's appeal amid rising social tensions and fragmented parliamentary dynamics, and to tighten relations between the ruling centrist bloc and traditional conservatives.

On 21 September of the same year, Vautrin was appointed Minister of Partnership with Territories and Decentralization in the government of Prime Minister Michel Barnier. During her time in office, France introduced a ban on smoking in areas where young people socialize including beaches, parks and sports facilities.

On 5 October 2025, Vautrin was reappointed Minister for Labour, Health, Solidarity, Families, Autonomy and Persons with Disabilities in the short-lived first Lecornu government. Her nomination reflected a choice for continuity, as she had already held a similar portfolio in the previous administration. However, the Lecornu government resigned the following day, on 6 October 2025, before any of its members could formally take office. Upon the formation of Sébastien Lecornu's second government, she was appointed Minister of the Armed Forces.
