= Dominique Vérien =

French politician (born 1965)

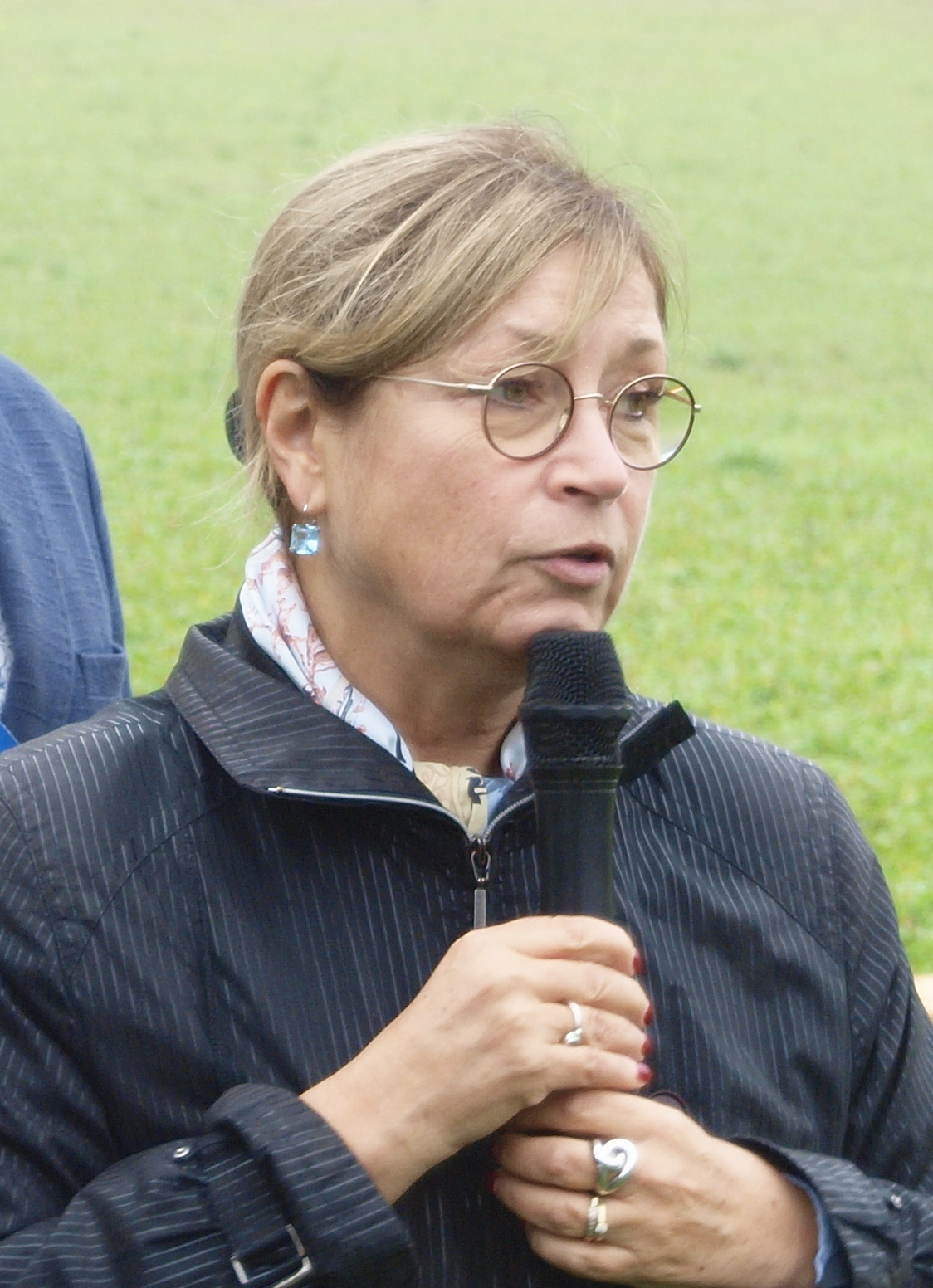
- Vérien in 2024

Senator for Yonne
- Incumbent
- Assumed office 17 December 2017
- Preceded by: Henri de Raincourt

Mayor of Saint-Sauveur-en-Puisaye
- In office 30 March 2014 – 12 January 2018
- Preceded by: Jean-Jacques Révillon
- Succeeded by: Yohann Corde

Personal details
- Born: 29 August 1965 (age 61)
- Party: Union of Democrats and Independents
- Education: École Spéciale des Travaux Publics
- Occupation: Engineer; Politician

Dominique Vérien (French pronunciation: [dɔminik veʁjɛ̃]; born 29 August 1965) is a French engineer and politician who has served as a Senator for Yonne since 2017. A member of the Union of Democrats and Independents (UDI), she sits with the Centrist Union group in the Senate. Vérien held the mayorship of Saint-Sauveur-en-Puisaye from 2014 to 2018.

== Biography ==
Vérien served one term as first deputy mayor of Saint-Sauveur-en-Puisaye from 2008 to 2014. She then served as mayor from 2014 until her resignation in 2018 following her election to the Senate.

In 2010 Vérien was a candidate in Yonne for the Regional Council of Burgundy but failed to be elected. She succeeded Guillaume Larrivé in 2012 following his election to the National Assembly and subsequent resignation from the Regional Council. She was reelected in 2015 to the newly-formed Regional Council of Bourgogne-Franche-Comté, a seat she held until her resignation in 2018.

Vérien ran for a Senate seat in 2014 but was defeated in the second round with 34.2% of the vote. In 2017 she won the by-election organised following the resignation of Henri de Raincourt with 36.6% of the second-round vote. In 2020 she was elected to a full term with 64% of the first-round vote.
