= Agnès Canayer =

French politician (born 1965)

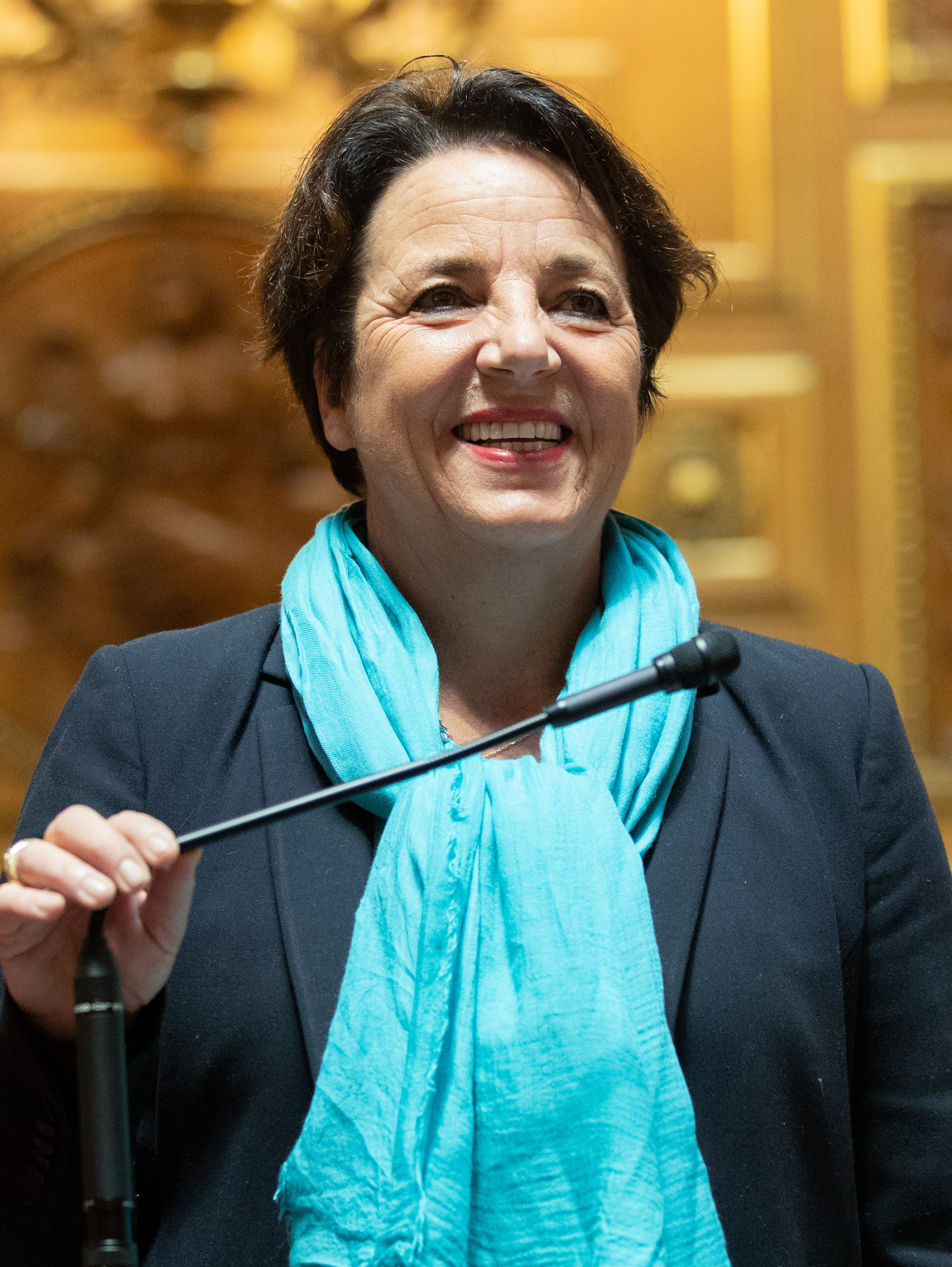
- Canayer in 2020

Minister Delegate for Family and Early Childhood
- In office 21 September 2024 – 23 December 2024
- Prime Minister: Michel Barnier
- Preceded by: Sarah El Haïry
- Succeeded by: Catherine Vautrin (Families, as Minister)

Member of the Senate
- In office 1 October 2014 – 21 October 2024
- Constituency: Seine-Maritime

Personal details
- Born: 21 September 1965 (age 61)
- Party: Union for a Popular Movement (2002–2015); The Republicans (2015–2022); Soyons libres (2017–2022)

Agnès Canayer (born 21 September 1965) is a French politician who served as minister delegate for family and early childhood from September to December 2024. She was elected member of the Senate in the 2014 Senate election, and was re-elected in 2020. From 2008 to 2017, she served as deputy mayor of Le Havre.

== Biography ==
Agnès Cahierre, daughter of Agathe Delamare and Philippe Cahierre, was born on September 21, 1965, in Sainte-Adresse, Seine-Maritime.

She obtained her high school diploma (baccalauréat série B) at Lycée Saint-Joseph in Le Havre. She then went on to earn a bachelor's degree in law from the University of Rouen, a master's degree in environmental law from Paris II Panthéon-Assas University, and a master's degree in public law from Paris 1 Panthéon-Sorbonne University.

She is also president of the local missions in Normandy (administrative region) and president of the local mission in the Le Havre region.
