= Christine Prunaud =

French politician

Member of the French Senate
- In office 2014–2020
- Constituency: Côtes-d'Armor

Personal details
- Born: 4 September 1950 (age 75) Saint-Brieuc, France
- Party: French Communist Party

Christine Prunaud (born 4 September 1950) is a French politician. She served as senator for Côtes-d'Armor from 2014 to 2020.

== Biography ==
One of three children in a politically socialist family, Prunaud is the granddaughter of Eugène Bagot, the mayor of Plénée-Jugon from 1945 to 1959.

As an adult, she was active in a number of advocacy groups, including ones for women's rights, secularism, and equality. She was elected to the municipal council of Lamballe in 2001, 2008, and 2014, serving a stint as deputy mayor.

=== Senatorial career ===
In the 2014 elections to the French senate, she ran as the second name on the common left-wing list led by Yannick Botrel, successfully winning a seat.

In the senate, she represents the Communist, Republican, Citizen and Ecologist group and has been a member of the Parliamentary Office on Evaluating Scientific and Technological Choices and sits on the board of the Centre national du livre.

Until October 2017, she sat on the Culture, Education, and Communication Committee. That month, she was named to the Foreign Affairs and Defence Committee.

On 24 June 2018, she was arrested in Ağrı along with two other French Communist Party members while serving as an observer for the 2018 Turkish general election.

She participated in a conference titled La souveraineté du peuple sahraoui sur ses ressources naturelles in November 2019 in Paris, which discussed issues surrounding the role of Morocco and multinationals in resource exploitation in Western Sahara.

In September 2020, she announced her retirement from politics.
