= Didier Mandelli =

French politician (born 1964)

Vice President of the Senate
- Incumbent
- Assumed office 22 October 2024

Member of the Senate
- Incumbent
- Assumed office 1 October 2014
- Constituency: Vendée

Personal details
- Born: 7 August 1964 (age 61)
- Party: LR (since 2015)

Didier Mandelli (born 7 August 1964) is a French politician serving as a member of the Senate since 2014. From 2001 to 2015, he served as mayor of Le Poiré-sur-Vie.
