= Annick Billon =

French politician (born 1967)

Member of the Senate
- Incumbent
- Assumed office 1 October 2014
- Constituency: Vendée

Personal details
- Born: 3 August 1967 (age 58)
- Party: Union of Democrats and Independents

Annick Billon (born 3 August 1967) is a French politician serving as a member of the Senate since 2014. Until 2017, she served as deputy mayor of Château-d'Olonne and as vice president of Les Sables d'Olonne Agglomération.

== Biography ==
She was initially deputy mayor of Château-d'Olonne, responsible for urban planning, until September 2017, and then remained a municipal councilor, as well as vice-president of the Olonnes community of municipalities. She has been a senator for Vendée since 2014.

On October 26, 2017, she succeeded Chantal Jouanno as chair of the delegation for women's rights.
