= Minister of Tourism (France) =

The Minister of Tourism is a cabinet member in the Government of France, frequently combined with Minister of Transportation, Minister of Public Works ("Ministre de l'Equipement"), Minister of Housing ("Logement"), Minister of Territorial Development ("Aménagement du territoire") and Minister of the Sea.

The current position of Minister of State for Foreign Trade, the Promotion of Tourism and French Nationals Abroad is held by Jean-Baptiste Lemoyne.

== Ministers of Tourism (1948 - present) ==
- 5 September 1948 - 11 September 1948 : Henri Queuille
- 11 September 1948 - 7 February 1950 : Christian Pineau
- 7 February 1950 - 2 July 1950 : Jacques Chastellain
- 2 July 1950 - 12 July 1950 : Maurice Bourgès-Maunoury
- 12 July 1950 - 8 March 1952 : Antoine Pinay
- 8 March 1952 - 28 June 1953 : André Morice
- 28 June 1953 - 19 June 1954 : Jacques Chastellain
- 19 June 1954 - 14 August 1954 : Jacques Chaban-Delmas
- 14 August 1954 - 3 September 1954 : Maurice Bourgès-Maunoury
- 3 September 1954 - 23 February 1955 : Jacques Chaban-Delmas
- 23 February 1955 - 1 February 1956 : Édouard Corniglion-Molinier
- 13 June 1957 - 1 June 1958 : Édouard Bonnefous
- 3 June 1958 - 9 June 1958 : Antoine Pinay
- 9 June 1958 - 8 January 1959 : Robert Buron
- 12 July 1972 - 27 February 1974 : Olivier Guichard
- 22 March 1983 - 17 July 1984 : Édith Cresson
- 17 July 1984 - 19 February 1986 : Michel Crépeau
- 19 March 1986 - 20 March 1986 : Jean-Marie Bockel
- 20 March 1986 - 12 May 1988 : Alain Madelin
- 5 July 1990 - 17 July 1990 : Jean-Marie Rausch
- 29 March 1993 - 18 May 1995 : Bernard Bosson
- 18 May 1995 - 7 November 1995 : Françoise de Panafieu
- 7 November 1995 - 4 June 1997 : Bernard Pons
- 7 May 2002 - 2 June 2005 Gilles de Robien
- 2 June 2005 - 2007 : Dominique Perben
- 4 September 2014 – present : Matthias Fekl
