= Loïc Hervé =

French politician (born 1980)

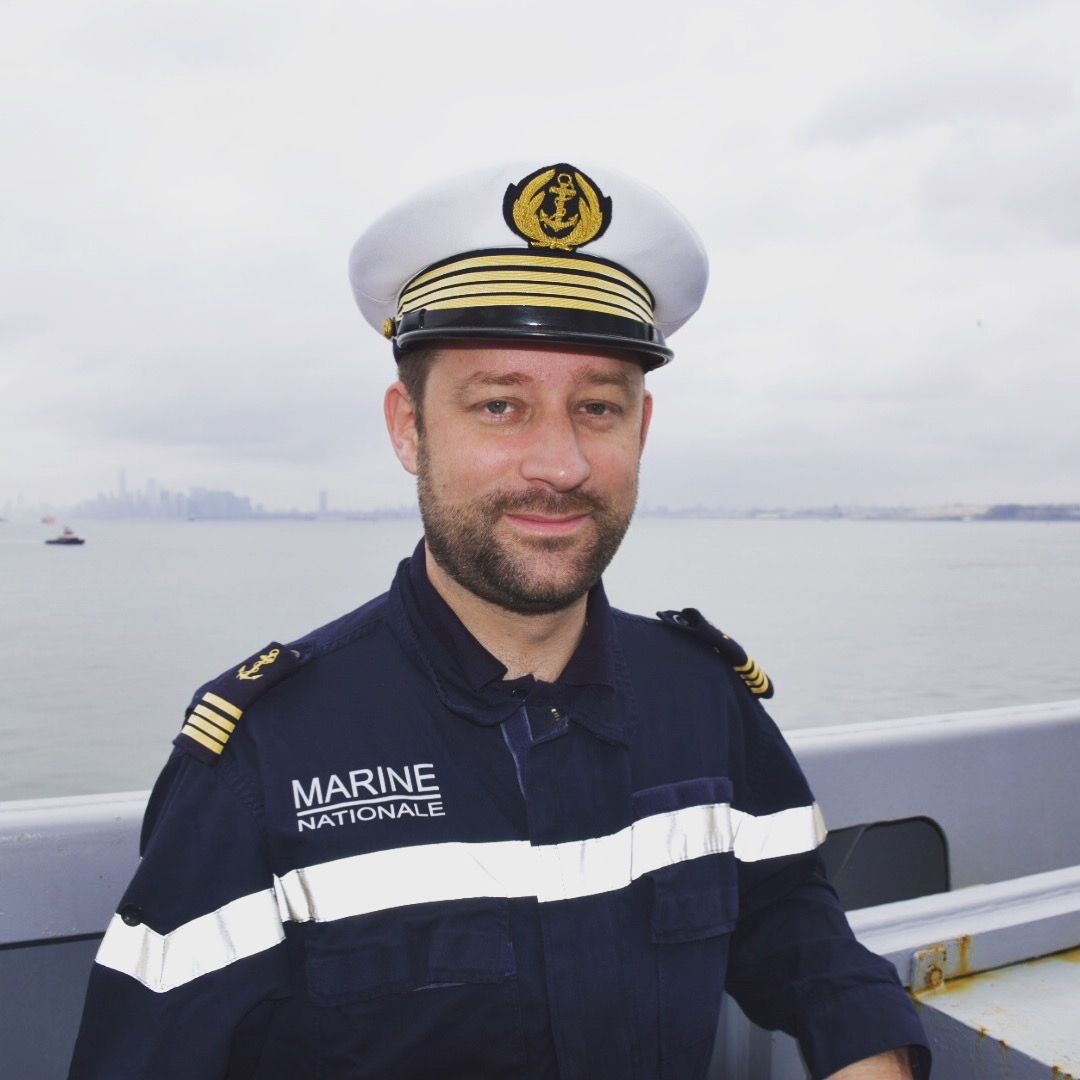
- Hervé in 2017

Member of the Senate
- Incumbent
- Assumed office 1 October 2014
- Constituency: Haute-Savoie

Mayor of Marnaz
- In office 15 March 2008 – 21 September 2017
- Preceded by: Arlette Debalme
- Succeeded by: Chantal Vannson

Personal details
- Born: 8 June 1980 (age 45)
- Party: The Centrists

Loïc Hervé (born 8 June 1980) is a French politician of The Centrists. Since 2014, he has been a member of the Senate. In 2023, he was elected as a vice president of the Senate, and as vice president and spokesperson of The Centrists. From 2008 to 2017, he served as mayor of Marnaz.
