= René Danesi =

French politician

Senator for Haut-Rhin
- Incumbent
- Assumed office 1 October 2014

Personal details
- Born: 30 August 1947 (age 78)

René Danesi (born 30 August 1947) is a French politician, elected a senator for Haut-Rhin in 2014.

== Biography ==
Danesi studied at Sciences Po Strasbourg.

Danesi was the mayor of Tagsdorf, Haut-Rhin from 1974 to 2017 as well as the 3rd vice-president of the Regional council of Alsace. A member of the UDI party, he was elected as a senator for Haut-Rhin on the list led by Catherine Troendlé on September 28th, 2014. He has sat within the UMP and The Republicans parliamentary groups. Between 2017 and 2018, Danesi was a member of the Parliamentary Assembly of the Council of Europe.

Dabesi supported candidate Nicolas Sarkozy in the open primary of the right and centre in 2016. Then he supported Laurent Wauquiez in the 2017 The Republicans leadership election which Wauquiez won.
