= Alain Chatillon =

French politician

Member of the French Senate for Haute-Garonne
- Incumbent
- Assumed office 1 October 2008

Mayor of Revel
- In office 19 March 1989 – 31 October 2017
- Preceded by: Jean Ricalens
- Succeeded by: Étienne Thibault

Personal details
- Born: 15 March 1943 (age 83) Revel, France
- Party: Radical Party; The Republicans

Alain Chatillon (French pronunciation: [alɛ̃ ʃatijɔ̃]; born 15 March 1943) is a member of the Senate of France. He represents the Haute-Garonne department and is a member of the Radical Party.

== Biography ==
After acquiring the Gerblé food group in 1972, Alain Chatillon founded the Diététique et Santé group in Revel, which later became Nutrition et Santé, France's leading manufacturer of dietary and organic foods. He co-founded and chaired the Agri Sud-Ouest competitiveness cluster from 2007 to 2014. Mayor of Revel since 1989 and regional councillor for the Midi-Pyrénées region, he was elected to the French Senate in the 2008 senatorial elections. He was re-elected mayor in the first round, with 68.82% of the vote in the 2008 elections and 75% in 2014.

He supported Alain Juppé in the 2016 Republican presidential primary.

A member of the UMP then LR group since 2008, in 2020 he joined Les Républicains and became a member of the REP group.

== Bibliography ==
- Page on the Senate website
