= Jean-Jacques Panunzi =

French politician

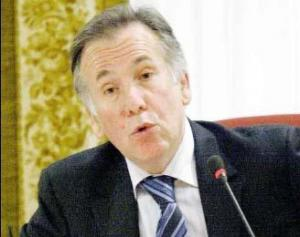

Member of the Senate for Corse-du-Sud
- Incumbent
- Assumed office 1 October 2014
- Preceded by: Nicolas Alfonsi

President of the General Council of Corse-du-Sud
- In office 6 November 2006 – 2 April 2015
- Preceded by: Roland Francisci
- Succeeded by: Pierre-Jean Luciani

Personal details
- Born: 5 April 1956 (age 70) Ajaccio, Corse-du-Sud
- Party: The Republicans

Jean-Jacques Panunzi (born 5 April 1956 in Ajaccio, Corse-du-Sud) is a member of the French Senate. He represents the Corse-du-Sud department, and is a member of the Republican Party.

== Biography ==
After attending high school in Sartène and enlisting in the armée de terre, in the commandos parachutistes in Toulouse, Jean-Jacques Panunzi chose in 1978 to return to live in Corsica and work in rural areas. Thus he participated in the development of the family carpentry business in Sorbollano, in Corse-du-Sud. His return also marks his first steps in politics.
