= Patricia Schillinger =

French politician

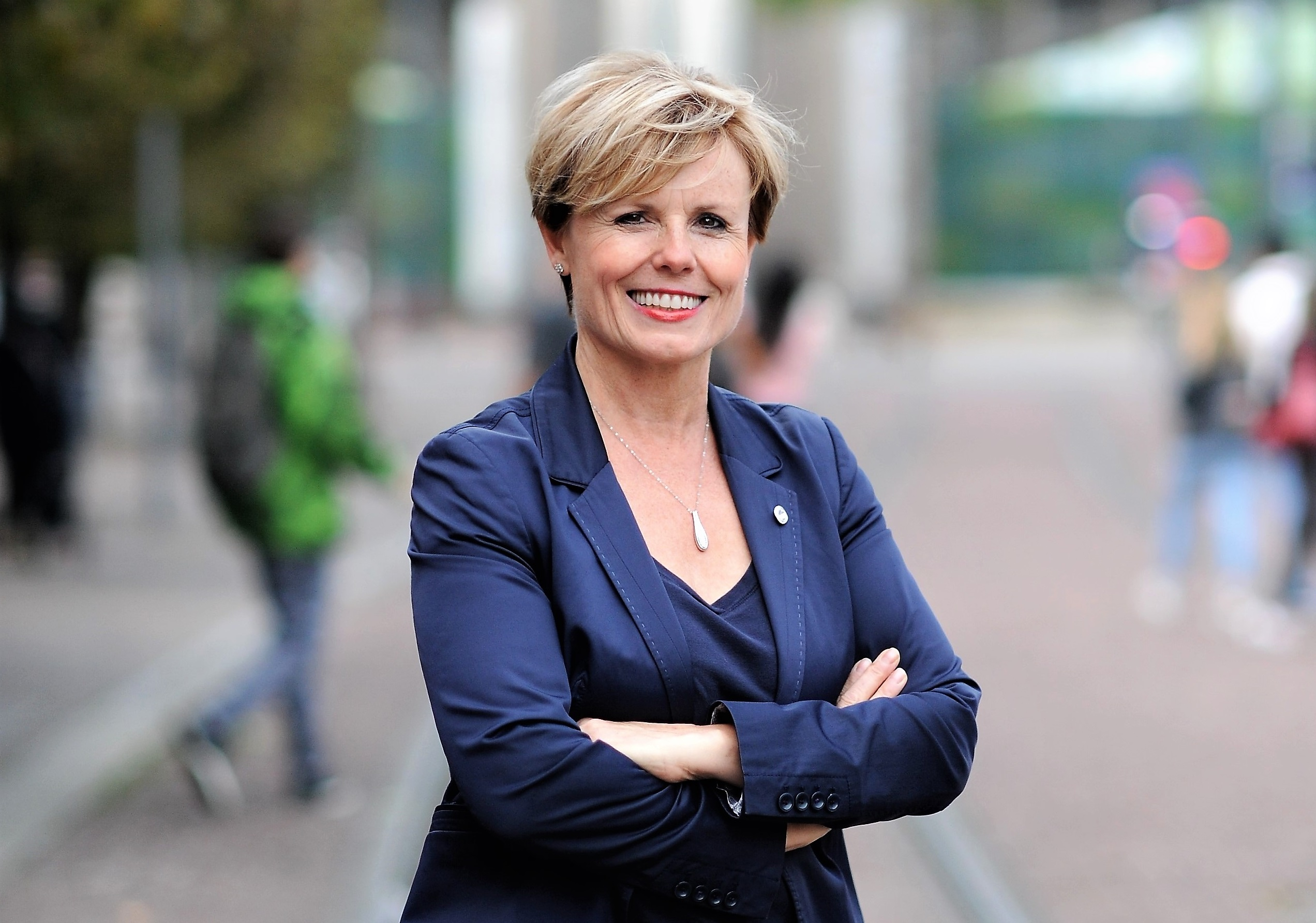

Member of the French Senate for Haut-Rhin
- Incumbent
- Assumed office 1 October 2004

Mayor of Hégenheim
- In office 2008–2014
- Preceded by: Bernard Herlin
- Succeeded by: Thomas Zeller

Personal details
- Born: 18 January 1963 (age 63) Strasbourg, France
- Party: La République En Marche!

Patricia Schillinger (born 18 January 1963) is a member of the Senate of France, representing the Haut-Rhin department since 2004. She is the mayor of the French village of Hégenheim, in Alsace. she was a member of the Socialist Party until 2017, when she moved to La République En Marche!
