= Patrick Boré =

French politician (1956–2021)

Senator for Bouches-du-Rhône
- In office 3 August 2020 – 5 July 2021
- Preceded by: Sophie Joissains
- Succeeded by: Brigitte Devésa

Mayor of La Ciotat
- In office 18 March 2001 – 3 September 2020
- Preceded by: Rosy Sanna
- Succeeded by: Arlette Salvo

Personal details
- Born: 9 November 1956 Toulon, France
- Died: 5 July 2021 (aged 64) La Ciotat, France
- Cause of death: Pancreatic cancer
- Party: Rally for the Republic; Union for a Popular Movement; The Republicans
- Profession: Pharmacist

Patrick Boré (9 November 1956 – 5 July 2021) was a French politician who served as a Senator for Bouches-du-Rhône from 2020 until his death in 2021. A member of The Republicans (LR), he previously held the mayorship of La Ciotat from 2001 to 2020 and a seat in the Departmental Council of Bouches-du-Rhône from 2004 to 2020, elected in the canton of La Ciotat. Under Departmental Council President Martine Vassal, Boré served a first vice president in charge of international and European affairs from 2015 to 2020. He died from cancer at the age of 64. He was a pharmacist by occupation.
