= Françoise Gatel =

French politician (born 1953)

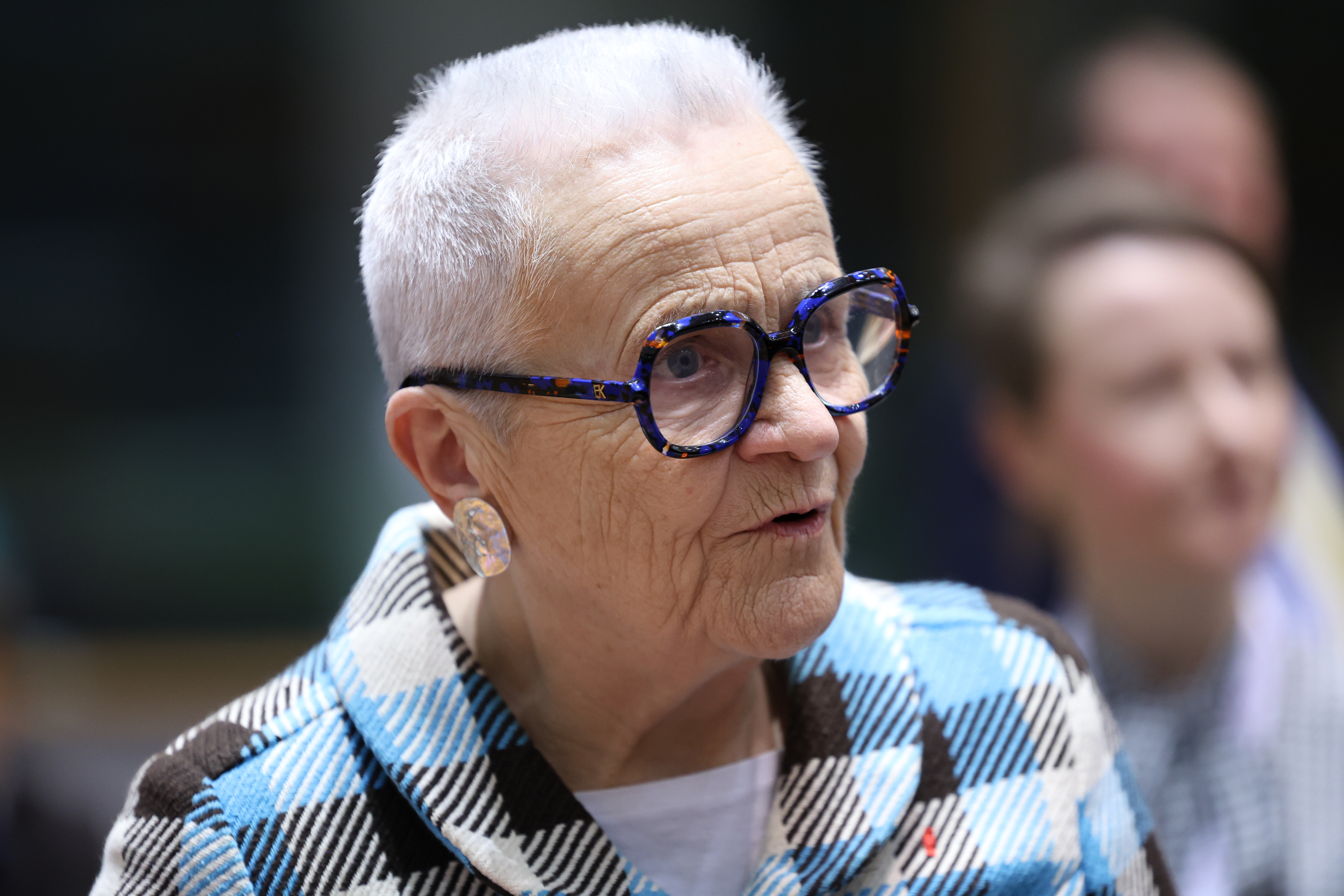
- Gatel in 2025

Minister for Regional Planning and Decentralisation
- Incumbent
- Assumed office 12 October 2025
- Prime Minister: Sébastien Lecornu
- Preceded by: Éric Woerth

Minister Delegate for Rurality, Commerce and Artisanry
- In office 21 September 2024 – 12 October 2025
- Prime Minister: Michel Barnier; François Bayrou; Sébastien Lecornu
- Preceded by: Dominique Faure (Rurality); Olivia Grégoire (Commerce and Artisanry, indirectly)
- Succeeded by: Véronique Louwagie (Commerce and Artisanry); Michel Fournier (Rurality)

Member of the Senate
- In office 1 October 2014 – 21 September 2024
- Constituency: Ille-et-Vilaine

Personal details
- Born: 14 March 1953 (age 73)
- Party: Union of Democrats and Independents

Françoise Gatel (French: [fʁɑ̃swaz ɡatɛl]; born 14 March 1953) is a French politician of the Union of Democrats and Independents (UDI) who served as Minister Delegate for Rural Affairs in the governments of successive Prime Ministers Michel Barnier and François Bayrou between 2024 and 2025, then as Minister for Regional Planning and Decentralization in the Second Lecornu government since October 2025.

== Early life ==
Gatel was born on 14 March 1953 in Rochefort-en-Terre. Prior to entering politics, she obtained a bachelor's degree in English and afterwards a DESS in business administration and management. In 1976, she became the project manager at the Rennes Chamber of Commerce and Industry.

== Political career ==
From 2001 to 2017, Gatel served as mayor of Châteaugiron. In September 2017, she announced she would step down as mayor of Châteaugiron, due to a law prohibiting dual mandates as both a mayor and parliamentarian that was formally implemented in 2017. However, she stated she would remain a municipal councillor for the city.

Gatel was first elected member of the Senate in the 2014 Senate election, and was re-elected in 2020. During her time in the Senate, she supported Alain Juppé for the 2016 The Republicans presidential primary ahead of the 2017 French presidential election. She also passed a law aiming at strengthening the control of private schools without a contract with the French State, which was integrated into the "Prevention to Protect" plan, what was aimed at stopping radicalization. Gatel also created the "Gatel Law", which was adopted on 1 August 2019, which was designed to ease the transition for newly merged municipalities by temporarily preserving a higher number of elected official, which acts as a decompression chamber until 2026, when standard rules will take over. However, critics argued the law made it harder to form candidate lists and risks low engagement, to which the Mayor of Baugé-en-Anjou, Philippe Chalopin, responded that the issue was now the law itself, but declining civic participation.
