= Sylvie Robert =

French politician (born 1963)

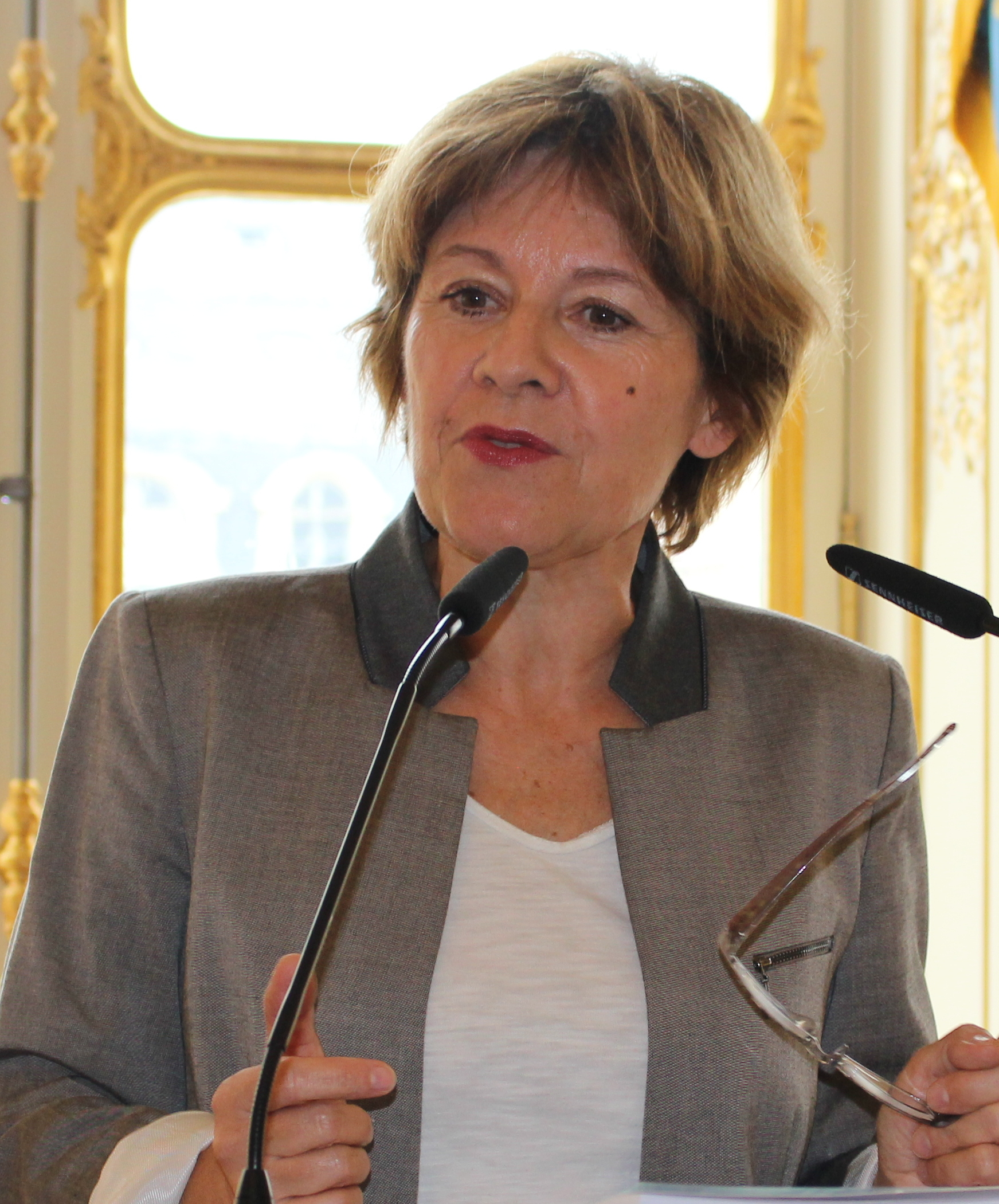
- Robert in 2016

Member of the Senate
- Incumbent
- Assumed office 1 October 2014
- Constituency: Ille-et-Vilaine

Personal details
- Born: 28 August 1963 (age 62)
- Party: Socialist Party (since 1985)

Sylvie Robert (born 28 August 1963) is a French politician serving as a member of the Senate since 2014. She has served as vice president of the Senate since 2023.
