= Catherine Morin-Desailly =

French politician

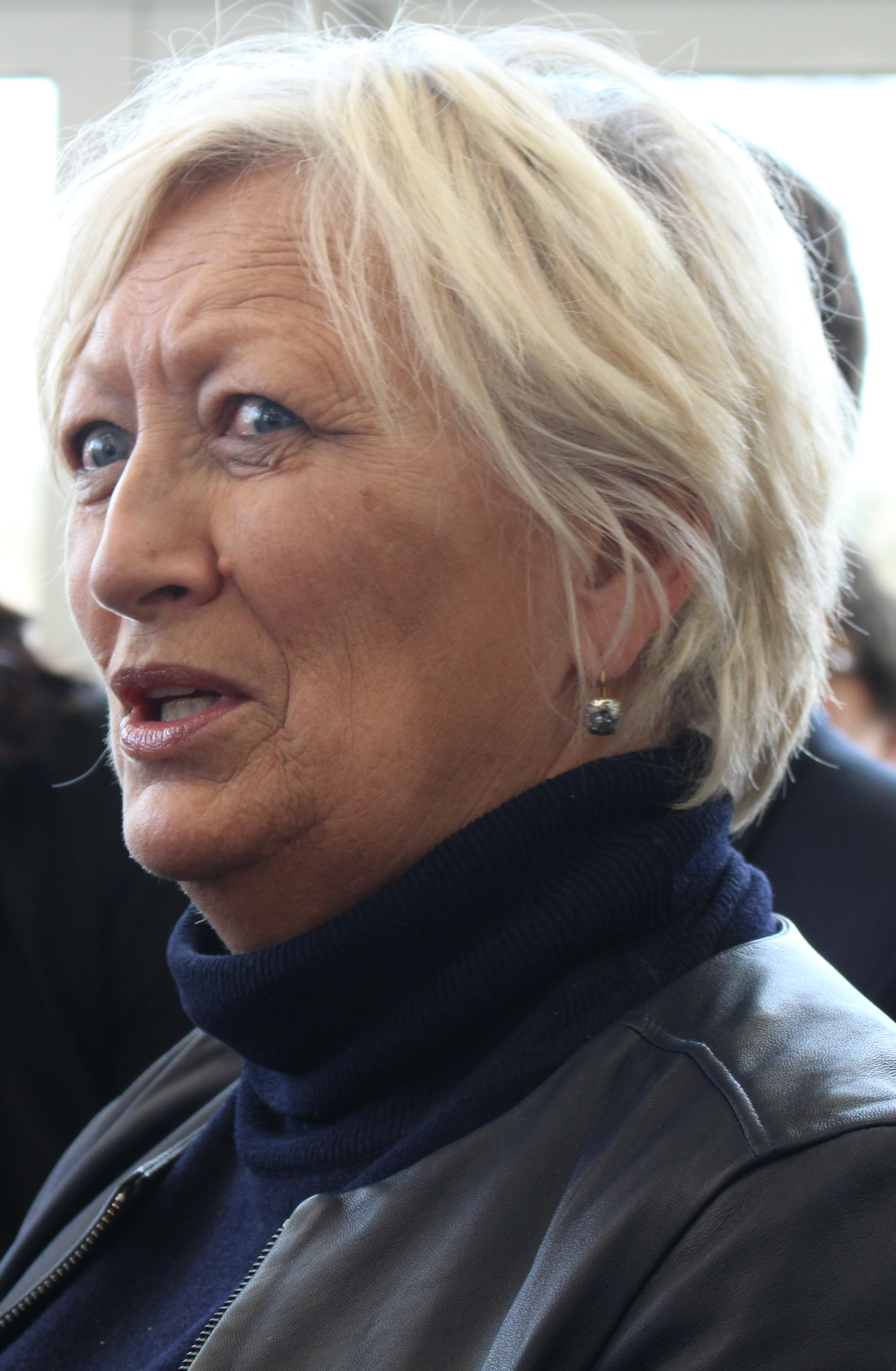
- Catherine Morin-Desailly in March 2019

Member of the French Senate for Seine-Maritime
- Incumbent
- Assumed office 1 October 2004
- Preceded by: Jacques Larché

Personal details
- Born: 6 July 1960 (age 66) Le Petit-Quevilly, France
- Party: LC; UDI
- Education: University of Rouen

Catherine Morin-Desailly (born 6 July 1960 in Le Petit-Quevilly, Seine-Maritime) is a French politician of the Union of Democrats and Independents (UDI) who has been serving as a member of the Senate of France since 2004, representing the Seine-Maritime department.

== Political career ==
In the Senate, Morin-Desailly serves on the Committee on Cultural Affairs and the Committee on European Affairs. Since 2014, she has been chairing the Committee on Cultural Affairs. In 2020, she also chaired the Senate’s fact-finding committee on the issue of repatriation of cultural heritage.

In addition to her committee assignments, Morin-Desailly chairs the French-Egyptian Parliamentary Friendship Group.

In late 2008, Morin-Desailly left the Democratic Movement (MoDem), to join the Centrists (LC). From 2009, she served as the party’s spokesperson on cultural affairs and media.

== Other activities ==
- FRAC Normandie Rouen, Chair of the Board

== Political positions ==
In June 2014, together with Chantal Jouanno, Morin-Desailly tabled a motion for a resolution to grant asylum to Edward Snowden.

== Bibliography ==
- Page on the Senate website
