= Jean-François Mayet =

French politician (born 1940)

Jean-François Mayet (born 30 January 1940 in Vatan, Indre) is a former member of the Senate of France, representing the Indre department from 2008 to 2020. He is a member of the Union for a Popular Movement.
