= Gisèle Jourda =

French politician

Member of the French Senate for Aude
- Incumbent
- Assumed office 1 October 2014
- Preceded by: Marcel Rainaud

Deputy Mayor of Trèbes
- In office 30 March 2014 – 25 May 2020
- Mayor: Éric Menassi

Personal details
- Born: 24 March 1955 (age 71) Marburg, West Germany
- Party: Socialist Party

Gisèle Jourda (born 24 March 1955) is a member of the French Senate, representing the department of Aude.

== Political career ==
Jourda was first elected to the French Senate on 28 September 2014. She is also the deputy mayor of Trèbes.

In 2023, Jourda publicly endorsed the re-election of the Socialist Party's chairman Olivier Faure.
