= Éric Jeansannetas =

French politician (born 1962)

Member of the Senate
- Incumbent
- Assumed office 1 October 2014
- Constituency: Creuse

Personal details
- Born: 21 October 1962 (age 63)
- Party: Socialist Party

Éric Jeansannetas (born 21 October 1962) is a French politician serving as a member of the Senate since 2014. From 2001 to 2021, he was a member of the Departmental Council of Creuse.
