= Philippe Mouiller =

French politician (born 1969)

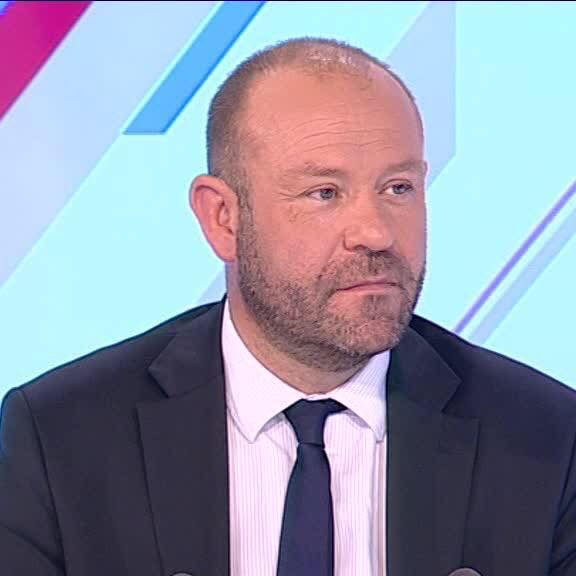
- Mouiller in 2019

Member of the Senate
- Incumbent
- Assumed office 1 October 2014
- Constituency: Deux-Sèvres

Personal details
- Born: 20 September 1969 (age 56)
- Party: LR (since 2015)

Philippe Mouiller (born 20 September 1969) is a French politician serving as a member of the Senate since 2014. From 2008 to 2017, he served as mayor of Moncoutant.
