= Jean-Jacques Lozach =

French politician (born 1954)

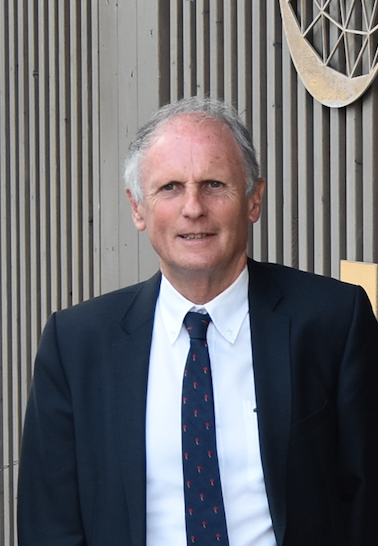
- Lozach in 2022

Senator for Creuse
- Incumbent
- Assumed office 1 October 2008

President of the General Council of Creuse
- In office 1 April 2001 – 2 April 2015
- Preceded by: Gérard Gaudin
- Succeeded by: Valérie Simonet

Personal details
- Born: 8 February 1954 (age 72) Bourganeuf, France
- Party: Socialist Party
- Profession: Teacher

Jean-Jacques Lozach (French pronunciation: [ʒɑ̃ʒak lɔzak]; born 8 February 1954) is a French politician who has represented the Creuse department in the Senate since 2008. A member of the Socialist Party, he presided over the General Council of Creuse from 2001 to 2015. Lozach previously served as Mayor of Masbaraud-Mérignat from 1986 to 1995 and Mayor of Bourganeuf from 1995 to 2001.

Lozach has served as the councillor of Creuse for the canton of Bourganeuf since 1994. He also served as a regional councillor of Limousin from 1998 to 2008, holding one of the regional council's vice presidencies during his tenure.
