= Minister of Territorial Development (France) =

French minister

Ministry of Partnership with Territories and Decentralization
- Ministre de l'Aménagement du Territoire et de la Décentralisation
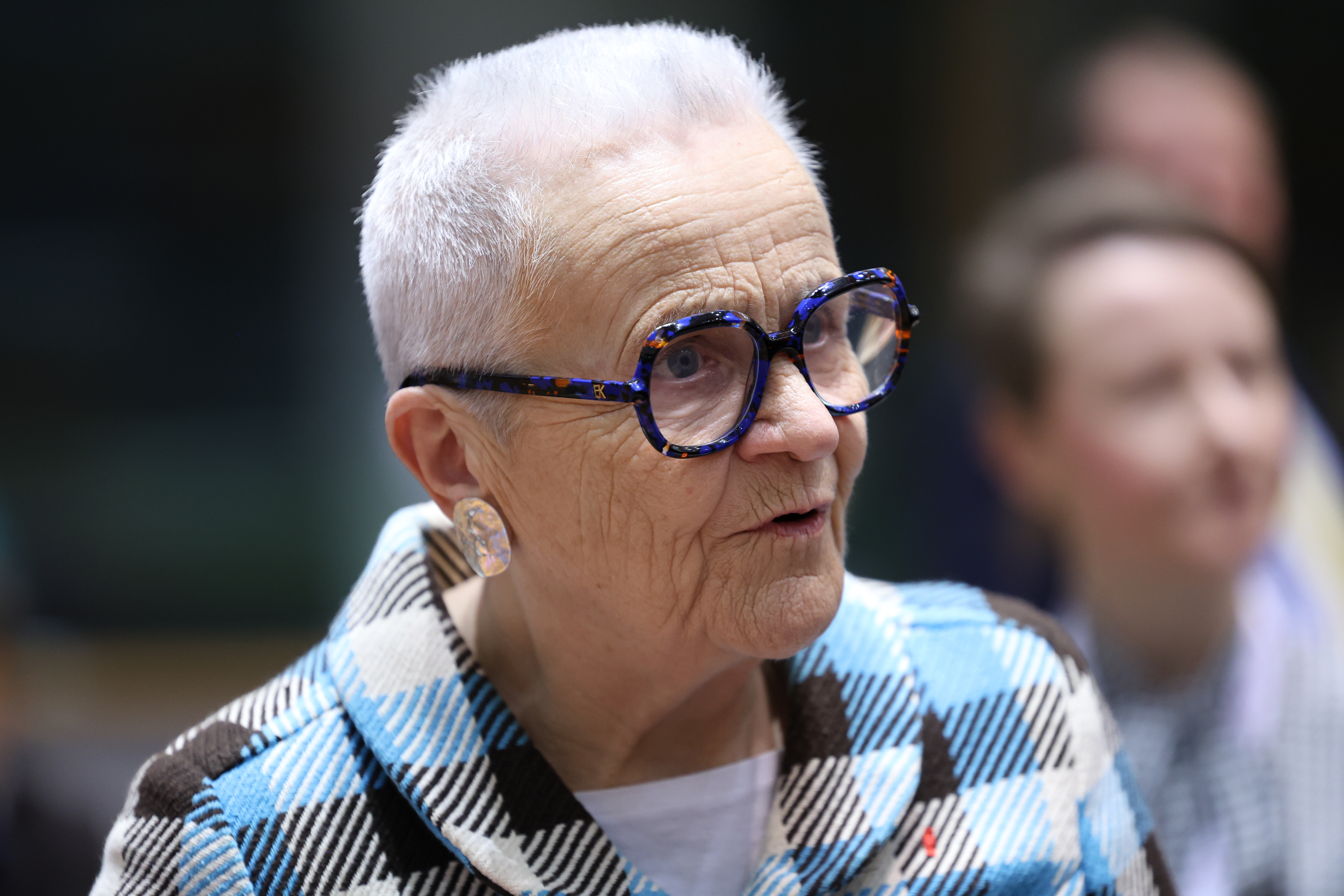
- Incumbent; Françoise Gatel since 12 October 2025
- Ministry of Territorial Cohesion
- Member of: Cabinet
- Reports to: President of the Republic; Prime Minister
- Seat: Hôtel de Castries 72, Rue de Varenne, Paris 7^{e}, France
- Nominator: Prime Minister
- Appointer: President of the Republic
- Term length: No fixed term
- Formation: 6 July 1972 (as Minister of Equipment, Housing and Spatial Planning)
- Website: Official website

The Ministry of Partnership with Territories and Decentralization (French: Ministre de l'Aménagement du territoire et de la Décentralisation) is a cabinet member in the Government of France, responsible for territorial cohesion; in particular with the regions and departments; they are also in charge of French decentralization The current officeholder is Catherine Vautrin of La République En Marche! (LREM).

The position has frequently been combined with the portfolios of Public Works (Équipement), Transportation (Transports), Tourism (Tourisme) and the Sea (Mer). The ministry had merged with the Ministry of Ecology, Energy, Sustainable Development and Territorial Development upon the election of Nicolas Sarkozy as President of France. In 2009, it has been separated from the Ecology Ministry and has taken the name of Ministry of Rural Areas and Spatial Planning.

== Ministers of Territorial Development (1972–present) ==
- 12 July 1972 – 28 May 1974: Olivier Guichard
- 27 August 1976 – 29 March 1977: Jean Lecanuet
- 29 March 1977 – 26 September 1977: Jean-Pierre Fourcade
- 26 September 1977 – 22 May 1981: Fernand Icart
- 22 May 1981 – 22 March 1983: Michel Rocard
- 17 July 1984 – 20 March 1986: Gaston Defferre
- 20 March 1986 – 10 May 1988: Pierre Méhaignerie
- 15 May 1991 – 2 April 1992: Michel Delebarre
- 29 March 1993 – 18 May 1995: Charles Pasqua
- 18 May 1995 – 7 November 1995: Bernard Pons
- 7 November 1995 – 4 June 1997: Jean-Claude Gaudin
- 4 July 1997 – 10 July 2001: Dominique Voynet
- 10 July 2001 – 7 May 2002: Yves Cochet
- 7 May 2002 – 31 March 2004: Jean-Paul Delevoye
- 31 March 2004 – 31 May 2005: Gilles de Robien
- 3 June 2005 – 23 June 2009: Hubert Falco, as Secretary of State for Territorial Development
- 23 June 2009 – 16 May 2012: Michel Mercier, as Minister of Rural Areas and Spatial Planning
- 16 May 2012 – 2 April 2014: Cécile Duflot, as Minister of Territorial Equality and Housing
- 2 April 2014 – 11 February 2016: Sylvia Pinel, as Minister of Territorial Equality and Housing
- 11 February 2016 – 10 May 2017: Jean-Michel Baylet, as Minister of Spatial Planning, Rurality and Territorial Communities, served with Emmanuelle Cosse, as Minister of Housing and Territorial Development
- 17 May 2017 – 19 June 2017: Richard Ferrand, as Minister of Territorial Cohesion
- 19 June 2017 – 16 October 2018: Jacques Mézard, as Minister of Territorial Cohesion
- 16 October 2018 – 5 March 2022: Jacqueline Gourault as Minister of Territorial Cohesion and Relations with Local Authorities
- 5 March 2022 – 20 May 2022 : Joël Giraud as Minister of Territorial Cohesion and Relations with Local Authorities
- 20 May 2022 – 4 July 2022 : Christophe Béchu as Minister of Territorial Cohesion and Relations with Local Authorities
- 4 July 2022 – 20 September 2024 : Christophe Béchu as Minister of Ecological Transition and Territorial Cohesion and Caroline Cayeux as Minister of Relations with Local Authorities
- 20 September 2024 - 23 December 2024: Catherine Vautrin as Minister of Partnership with Territories and Decentralization
- 23 December 2024 – 5 October 2025: François Rebsamen
- 5 October 2025 – 12 October 2025: Éric Woerth
- 12 October 2025 – present: Françoise Gatel

== See also ==
- Minister in charge of Housing (France)
