= François-Noël Buffet =

French politician (born 1963)

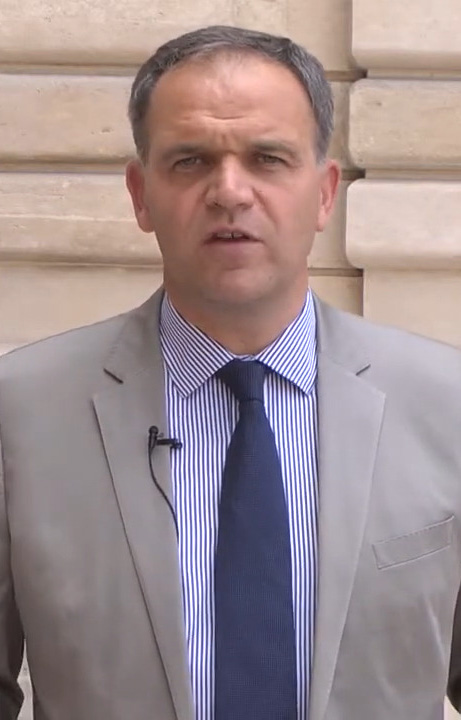

Minister to the Minister of State, Minister of the Interior
- In office 23 December 2024 – 5 October 2025
- Prime Minister: François Bayrou
- Minister: Bruno Retailleau
- Succeeded by: Marie-Pierre Vedrenne

Minister to the Prime Minister for the Overseas
- In office 21 September 2024 – 23 December 2024
- Prime Minister: Michel Barnier
- Preceded by: Marie Guévenoux (Minister Delegate)
- Succeeded by: Manuel Valls (Minister of State)

Senator for Rhône
- In office 1 October 2004 – 21 October 2024

Mayor of Oullins
- In office 23 October 1997 – 23 October 2017
- Preceded by: Michel Terrot
- Succeeded by: Clotilde Pouzergue

Personal details
- Born: 28 August 1963 (age 63) Lyon, France
- Party: The Republicans (2015–present)
- Other political affiliations: Rally for the Republic (1990–2002); Union for a Popular Movement (2002–2015)
- Profession: Lawyer

François-Noël Buffet (French pronunciation: [fʁɑ̃swanɔɛl byfɛ]; born 28 August 1963) is a French lawyer and politician who served as Minister to Minister of the Interior Bruno Retailleau in the government of Prime Minister François Bayrou from 2024 to 2025. A member of The Republicans (LR), he previously served as Minister of the Overseas in the government of Prime Minister Michel Barnier between September and December 2024. Buffet was a Senator for Rhône from 2004 until his appointment to the government in 2024.

== Political career ==
Buffet, who first entered the municipal council of Oullins in 1990, became Deputy Mayor of Oullins in 1995 under the mayorship of Michel Terrot. He served as Mayor of Oullins from 1997 to 2017. He has also served as a metropolitan councillor of Lyon since 2015.

During his time in the Senate from 2004 to 2024, Buffet served on the Committee on Legal Affairs, which he chaired from 2020.

Buffet briefly served as Minister of the Overseas in the government of Prime Minister Michel Barnier from September to December 2024. On 23 December, he changed ministry and was appointed as a deputy to the minister of the Interior.

== Political positions ==
Starting in 2013, Buffet participated in demonstrations opposing same-sex marriage and signed the La Manif pour tous charter in 2014.

In the Republicans' 2016 primary, Buffet endorsed former Prime Minister François Fillon as the party's candidate for President of France in the 2017 elections. In the Republicans’ 2017 leadership election, he supported Laurent Wauquiez.

In 2021, he voted against the extension of assisted reproductive technology and then, in 2024, he opposed the constitutionalization of abortion.
