= Pierre-Yves Collombat =

French politician (1945–2026)

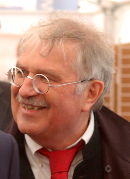
Pierre-Yves Collombat

Pierre-Yves Collombat (18 July 1945 – 17 October 2026) was a French politician who was a member of the Senate of France. He represented the Var department, and was a member of the Socialist Party. Collombat died on 17 October 2026, at the age of 81.

== Sources ==
- Page on the Senate website (in French)
