= Antoine Lefèvre =

French politician (born 1966)

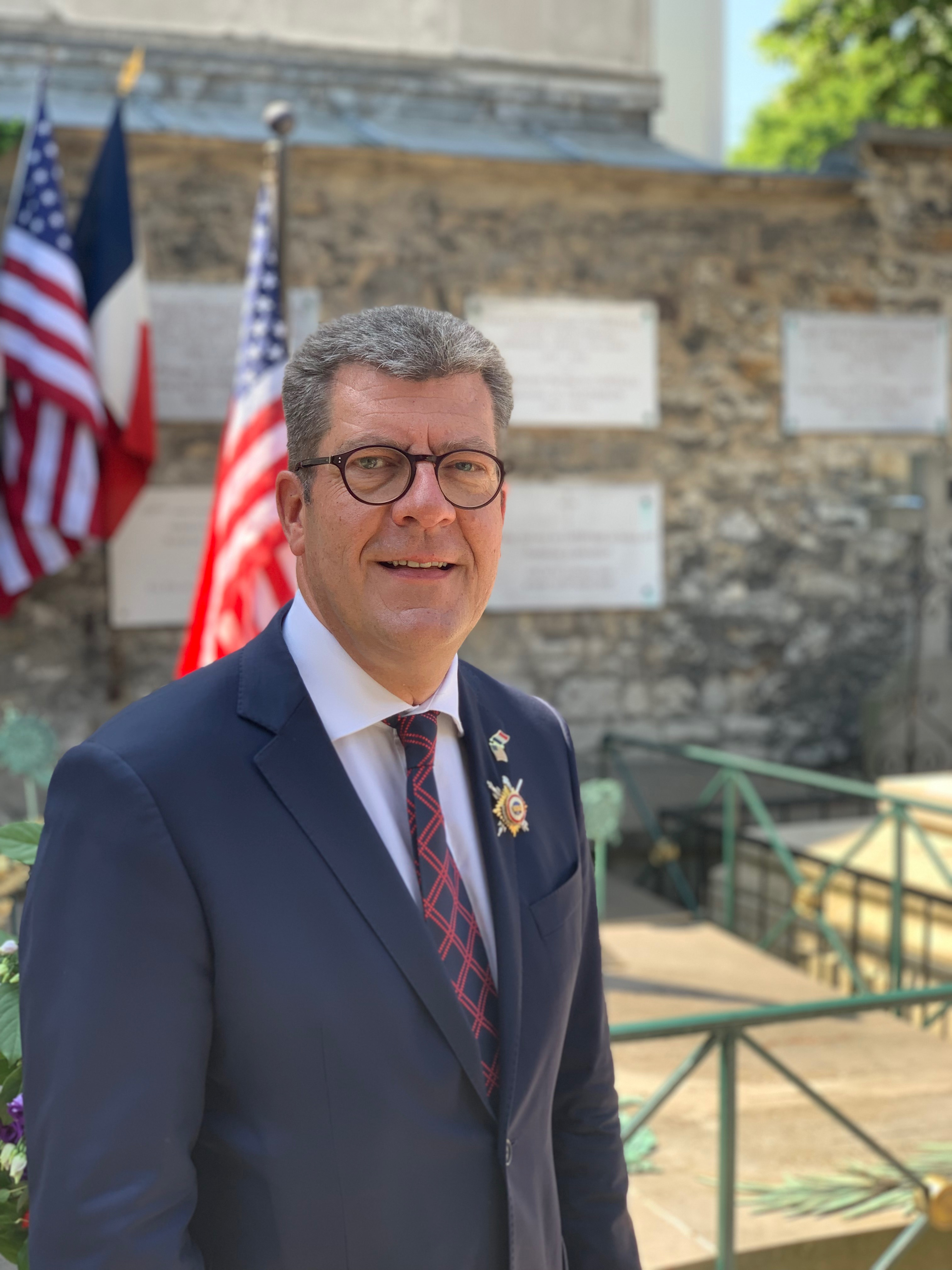
- Antoine Lefèvre

Member of the French Senate for Aisne
- Incumbent
- Assumed office 1 October 2008
- Preceded by: Paul Girod

Mayor of Laon
- In office 2001–2017
- Preceded by: Jean-Claude Lamant
- Succeeded by: Éric Delhaye

Personal details
- Born: 18 February 1966 (age 60) Düsseldorf, Germany
- Party: The Republicans

Antoine Lefèvre (born in Düsseldorf 18 February 1966) is a French politician of the Republicans (LR) who has been serving as a member of the Senate of France since 2008, representing the Aisne department.

== Career ==
Antoine Lefèvre was mayor of the medieval city and prefecture of Aisne, Laon, from 2001 to 2017. Since 2020, Lefèvre has been serving as a judge on the Court of Justice of the Republic.

On 1 December 2022, Lefèvre was among the guests invited to the state dinner hosted by U.S. President Joe Biden in honor of President Emmanuel Macron at the White House.

He is the Chairman of the France-United States Friendship Group in the French Senate.
