= Jean-Baptiste Lemoyne (politician) =

French politician (born 1977)

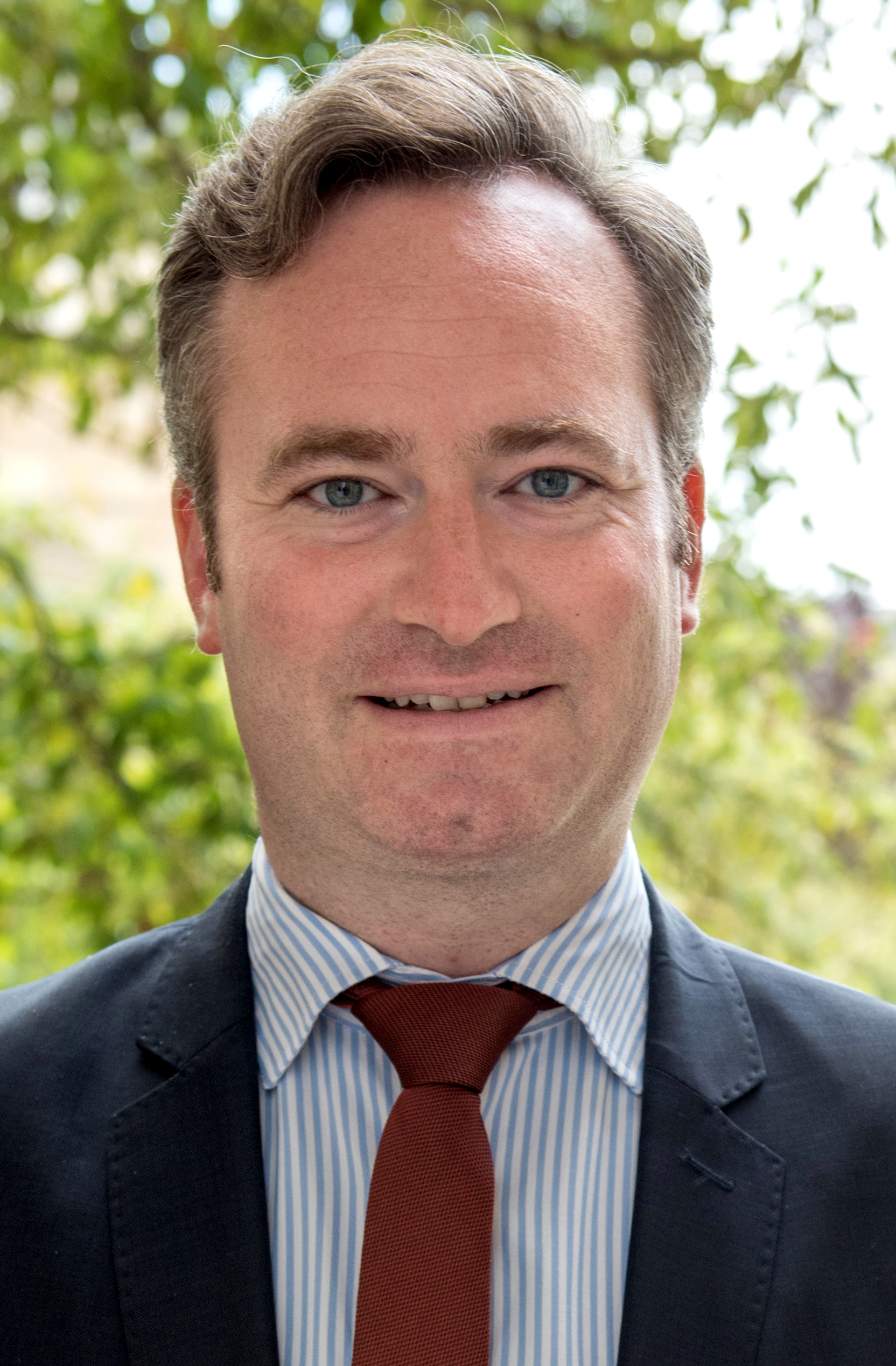

Member of the French Senate for Yonne
- Incumbent
- Assumed office 21 June 2022
- Preceded by: Marie-Agnès Évrard

Minister Delegate for Tourism, French living abroad, Francophonie and Small and medium-sized enterprises
- In office 8 December 2021 – 20 May 2022
- President: Emmanuel Macron
- Prime Minister: Jean Castex
- Preceded by: Alain Griset

Secretary of State for Tourism, French living abroad and Francophonie
- In office 26 July 2020 – 11 December 2021
- President: Emmanuel Macron
- Prime Minister: Jean Castex

Secretary of State to the Minister for Europe and Foreign Affairs
- In office 21 June 2017 – 6 July 2020
- President: Emmanuel Macron
- Prime Minister: Édouard Philippe
- Preceded by: Renaud Muselier

Personal details
- Born: 15 September 1977 (age 49) Bourg-la-Reine, France
- Party: Renaissance
- Education: Sciences Po Strasbourg; ESSEC Business School

Jean-Baptiste Lemoyne (French pronunciation: [ʒɑ̃ batist ləmwan]; born 15 September 1977) is a French politician of La République En Marche! (LREM) who served as Secretary of State at the Minister for Europe and Foreign Affairs in the governments of successive Prime Ministers Édouard Philippe and Jean Castex from 2019 to 2022.

== Early life ==
Lemoyne was born on 15 September 1977 in Bourg-la-Reine, France.

== Political career ==
In June 2002 he took one of his first political positions, becoming a technical advisor to Secretary of State for Relations with Parliament, Jean-François Copé. Two years later, in March 2004, when Copé became Minister delegated to the Interior and the government's spokesman Lemoyne followed as a technical advisor to him. In May 2005 he was appointed to the cabinet as a technical advisor of him again when he became Minister delegate for the Budget and State Reform alongside still being the government's spokesman. After the presidential and legislative elections of 2007, Lemoyne became deputy chair of the UMP parliamentary group at the National Assembly. He held this position until 2014, under successive chairmen Jean-François Copé (2007-2010) and Christian Jacob (2010-2014).

== Political positions ==
He was a notable opponent of the Law 2013-404, which granted same-sex couples the rights to same-sex marriage and for same-sex adoption. He first accused on Twitter of the National Assembly gagging right-wing deputies, and stated on Radio Fréquence Gaie he was going to help in the fight against marriage for all after voting against it. He later held a rally in Yonne after the law passed.

When German Chancellor Angela Merkel called for European Union member states to give European Commissioner for Trade Cecilia Malmström a clear mandate for negotiations with the United States on metal tariffs in 2018, Lemoyne publicly opposed these plans.
