= Hervé Maurey =

French politician

Member of the French Senate for Eure
- Incumbent
- Assumed office 1 October 2008
- Preceded by: Jean-Luc Miraux

Member of the Regional council of Normandy
- Incumbent
- Assumed office 4 January 2016
- President: Hervé Morin

Mayor of Bernay
- In office 1 January 2003 – 18 May 2016
- Preceded by: Joël Bourdin
- Succeeded by: Jean-Hugues Bonamy

Personal details
- Born: 7 May 1961 (age 65) France
- Party: The Centrists
- Education: Panthéon-Assas University; Sciences Po

Hervé Maurey (born 7 May 1961) is a member of the Senate of France, representing the Eure department. He is a member of the New Centre (NC). He has been the mayor of Bernay, Eure between 2003 and 2016.

== Political career ==
In the Senate, Maurey chairs the Committee on Regional Planning and Sustainable Development. In addition to his committee assignments, he is a member of the Senate’s French-Ukrainian Parliamentary Friendship Group.

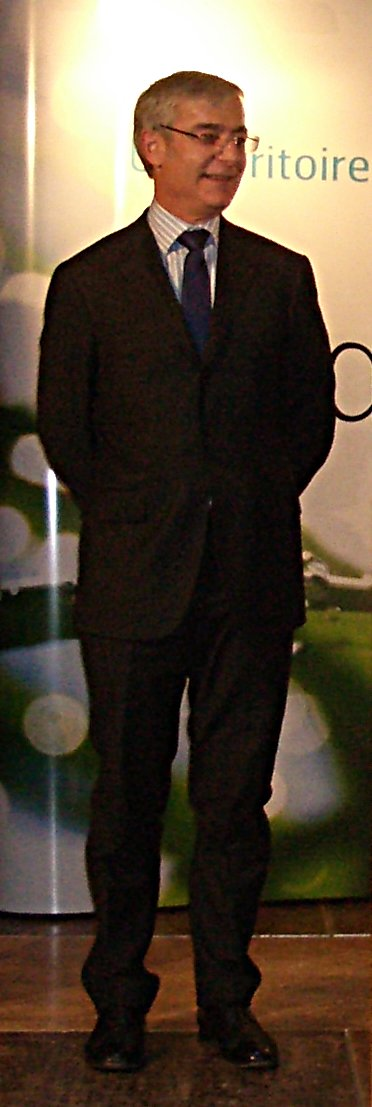
Herve Maurey

== Other activities ==
- SNCF, Member of the Supervisory Board
