= Stéphane Le Rudulier =

French politician (born 1973)

Member of the Senate
- Incumbent
- Assumed office 1 October 2020
- Constituency: Bouches-du-Rhône

Personal details
- Born: 9 December 1973 (age 52)
- Party: LR (since 2015)

Stéphane Le Rudulier (born 9 December 1973) is a French politician serving as a member of the Senate since 2020. From 2016 to 2020, he served as mayor of Rognac.
