= Alain Houpert =

French politician

Member of the French Senate for Côte-d'Or
- Incumbent
- Assumed office 1 October 2008

Personal details
- Born: 13 August 1957 (age 69) Dijon, France
- Party: The Republicans
- Education: University of Burgundy
- Profession: Radiologist

Alain Houpert (born 13 August 1957) is a French radiologist and politician and a member of the Senate of France. He represents the Côte-d'Or department and is a member of the Union for a Popular Movement Party.
