= Yves Daudigny =

French politician

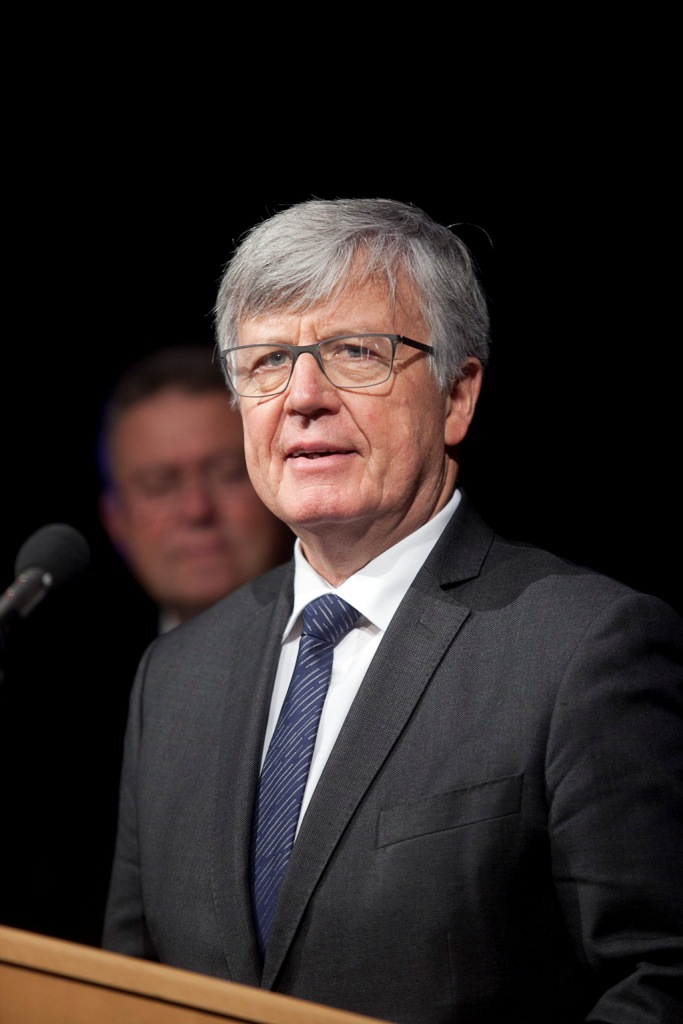

Member of the French Senate for Aisne
- Incumbent
- Assumed office 1 October 2008

Personal details
- Born: 23 February 1947 (age 79) Chavignon, Aisne Department, France
- Party: Socialist Party
- Profession: Teacher

Yves Daudigny (born 23 February 1947) is a French politician and member of the Senate of France. He represents the Aisne department, in Picardy, and is a member of the Socialist Party.

Daudigny is best known for his proposal to introduce a controversial 300% tax increase on palm oil, dubbed "the Nutella Tax" by the media because palm oil is one of the main ingredients in Nutella.

== Bibliography ==
- Page on the Senate website
