= Yannick Botrel =

French politician

Member of the French Senate for Côtes-d'Armor
- In office 1 October 2008 – 30 September 2020

Mayor of Bourbriac
- In office 18 June 1995 – 29 March 2014
- Preceded by: Roger Le Berre
- Succeeded by: Guy Cadoret

Personal details
- Born: 9 December 1951 (age 74) Pabu, Brittany, France
- Party: Socialist Party

Yannick Botrel (born 9 December 1951) is a former member of the Senate of France, representing the Côtes-d'Armor department. He is a member of the Socialist Party.
