= Minister delegate (France) =

French government minister

A minister delegate (French: Ministre délégué, [ministʁ deleɡe]) (Note: Feminine: Ministre déléguée, identical pronunciation.) is a minister in the Government of France in charge of a specific issue within a ministry. They are placed under the authority of a specific cabinet minister or that of the Prime Minister. According to protocol, a minister delegate ranks between a minister and a secretary of state.

== Ministers delegate in the Castex government ==
=== Attached to the Prime Minister ===
- Marc Fesneau Minister delegate for Relations with Parliament and Citizen Participation, attached to the Prime Minister
- Élisabeth Moreno Minister delegate for Gender Equality, Diversity and Equal Opportunities, attached to the Prime Minister

=== Attached to the Minister for Europe and Foreign Affairs ===
- Franck Riester Minister delegate for Foreign Trade and Economic Attractiveness, attached to the Minister for Europe and Foreign Affairs

=== Attached to the Minister for Ecological Transition ===
- Emmanuelle Wargon Minister delegate for Housing, attached to the Minister for the Ecological Transition
- Jean-Baptiste Djebbari Minister delegate for Transport, attached to the Minister for the Ecological Transition

=== Attached to the Minister of National Education, Youth and Sport ===
- Roxana Maracineanu Minister delegate for Sport, attached to the Minister of National Education, Youth and Sport

=== Attached to the Minister of the Economy, Finance and the Recovery ===
- Gabriel Attal Minister delegate for Public Accounts, attached to the Minister of the Economy, Finance and the Recovery
- Agnès Pannier-Runacher Minister delegate for Industry, attached to the Minister of the Economy, Finance and the Recovery
- Alain Griset Minister delegate for Small and Medium-sized Enterprises, attached to the Minister of the Economy, Finance and the Recovery

=== Attached to the Minister for the Armed Forces ===
- Geneviève Darrieussecq Minister delegate for Remembrance and Veterans, attached to the Minister for the Armed Forces

=== Attached to the Minister of the Interior ===
- Marlène Schiappa Minister delegate for Citizenship, attached to the Minister of the Interior

=== Attached to the Minister of Labour, Employment and Economic Inclusion ===
- Brigitte Klinkert Minister delegate for Economic Inclusion, attached to the Minister of Labour, Employment and Economic Inclusion

=== Attached to the Minister for Territorial Cohesion and Relations with Local Government ===
- Nadia Hai Minister delegate for Urban Affairs, attached to the Minister for Territorial Cohesion and Relations with Local Government

=== Attached to the Minister for Solidarity and Health ===
- Brigitte Bourguignon Minister delegate for Personal Independence, attached to the Minister for Solidarity and Health

== See also ==
- Minister (government)
- Government of France
- Prime Minister of France
