= 2026 French Senate election =

- 27 September 2026

178 (out of 348) in the French Senate 175 seats needed for a majority
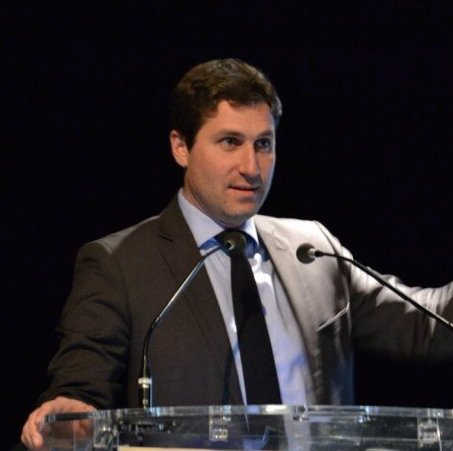

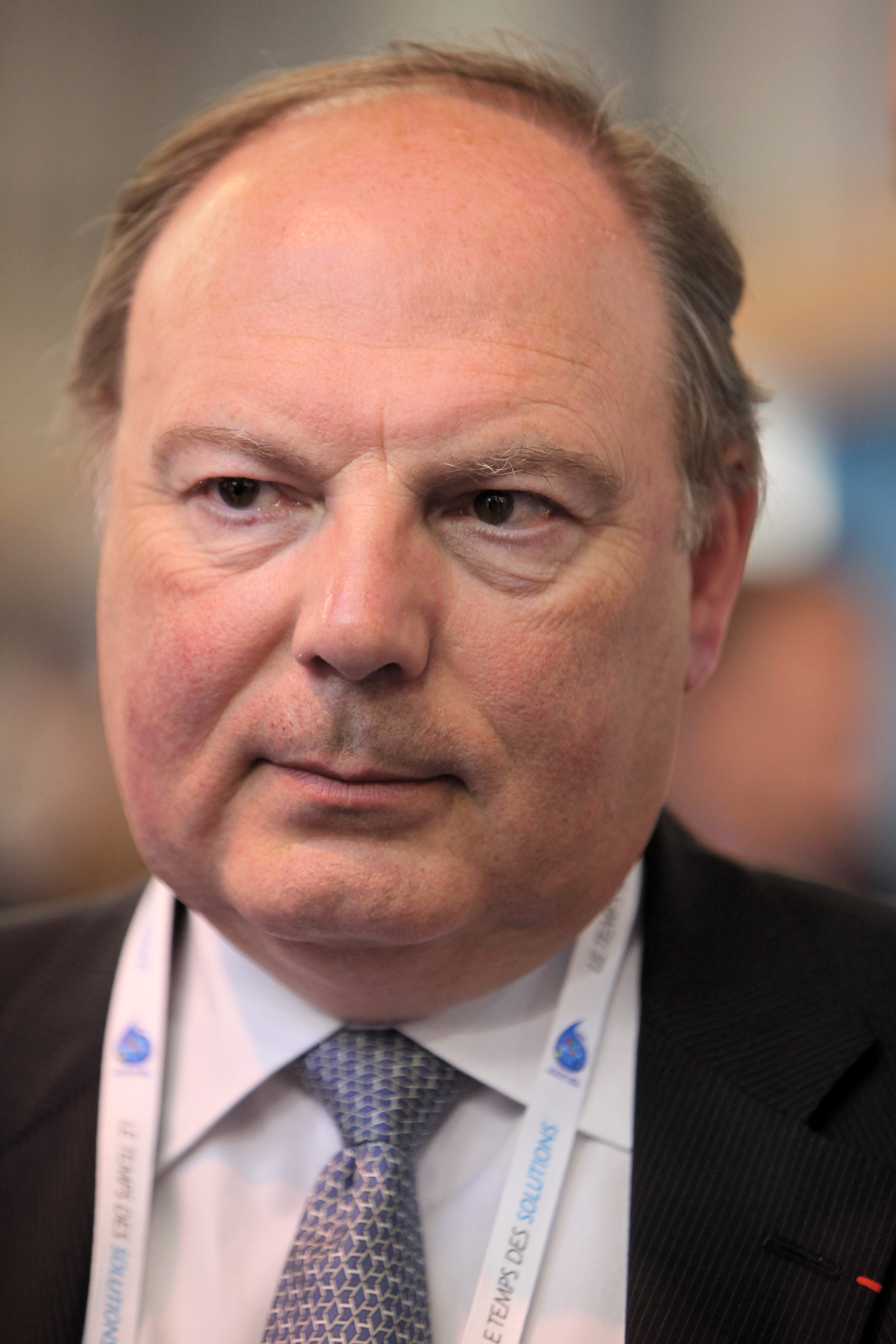

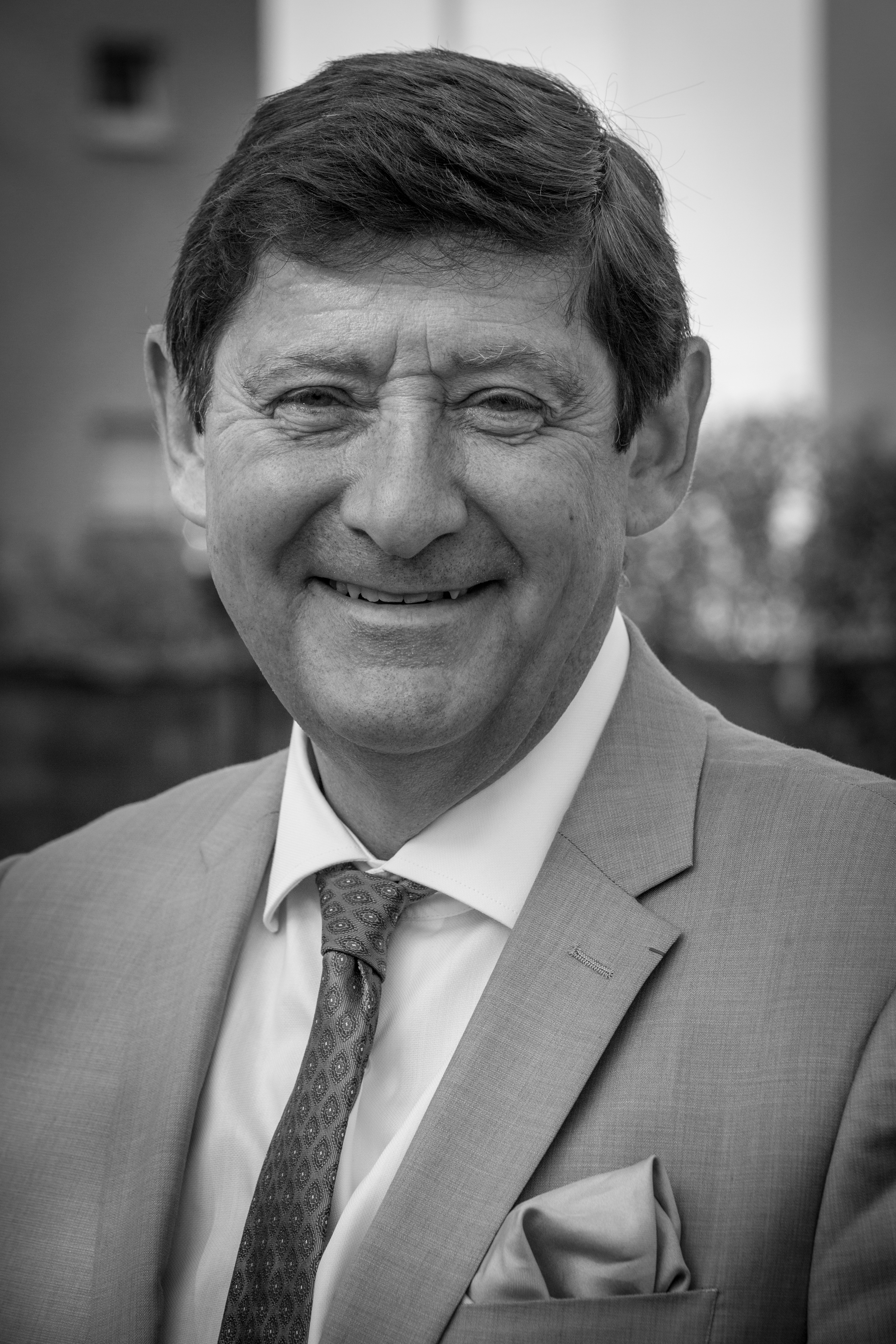

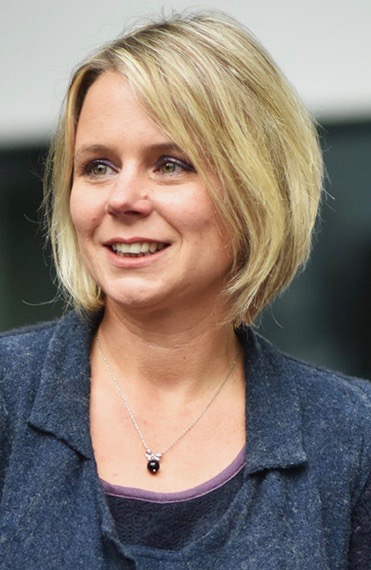

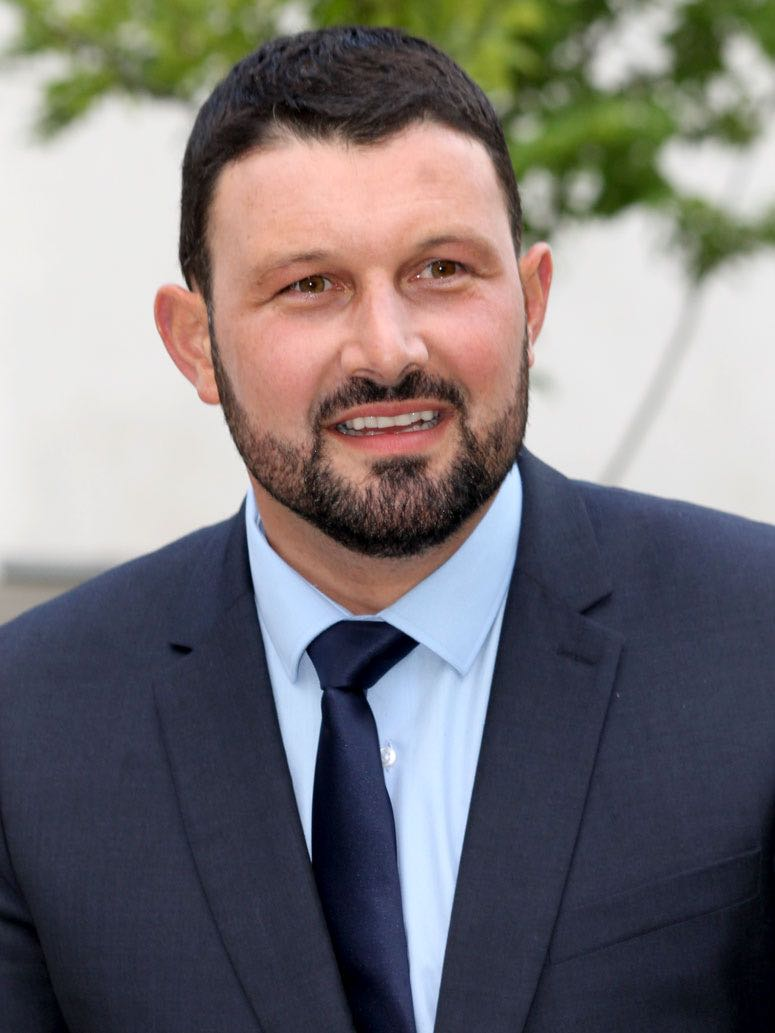

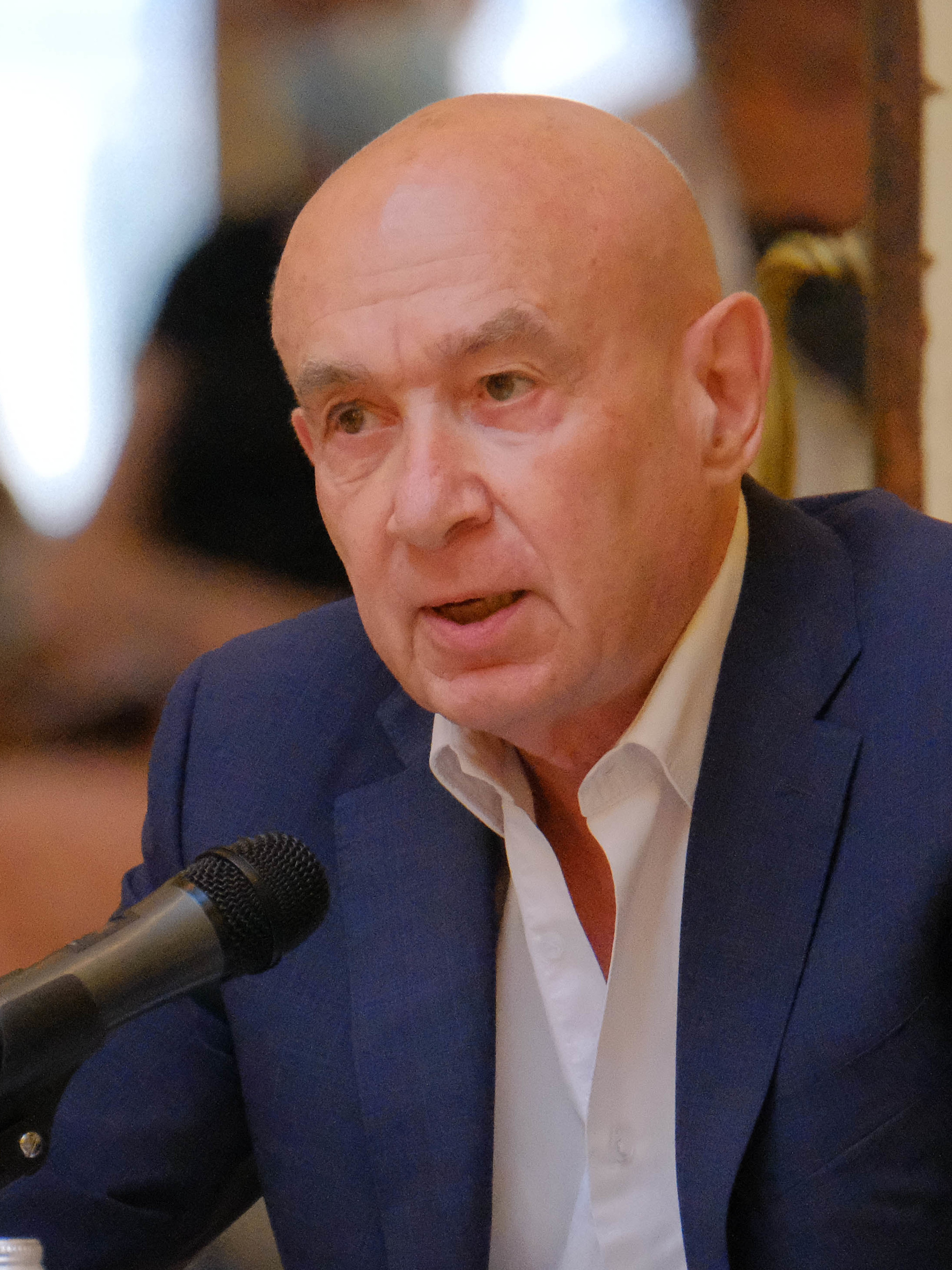

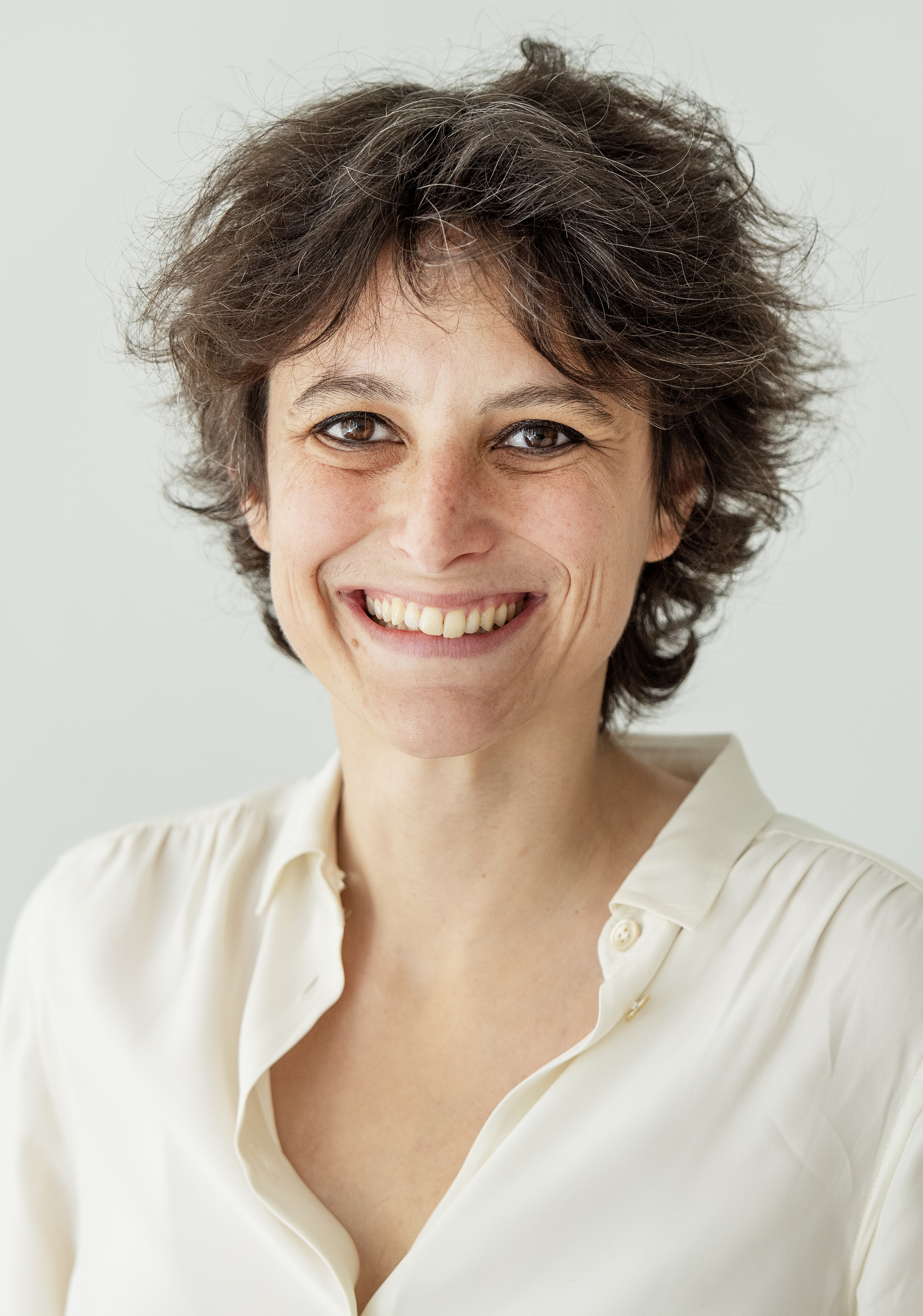

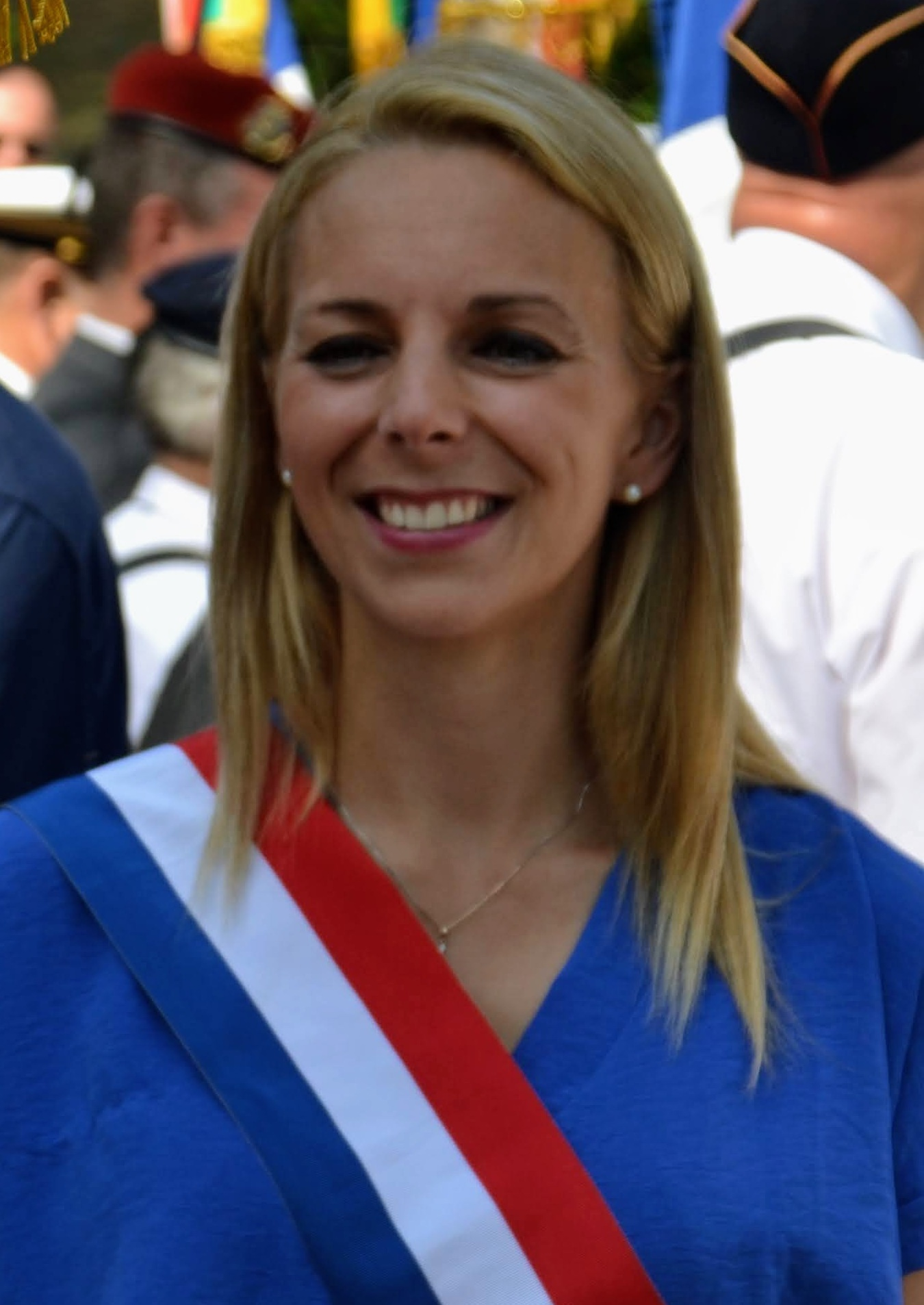
Leader	Mathieu Darnaud	Hervé Marseille	Patrick Kanner
Alliance	REP	UC	SOC
Leader's seat	Ardèche	Hauts-de-Seine	Nord
Last election	133 seats	56 seats	64 seats
Seats before	130	59	65
Seats after	124	63	62
Seat change	▼9	▲7	▼2
Leader	Maryse Carrère	Cécile Cukierman	Xavier Iacovelli
Alliance	RDSE	CRCE	RDPI
Leader's seat	Hautes-Pyrénées	Loire	Hauts-de-Seine
Last election	16 seats	18 seats	22 seats
Seats before	17	18	19
Seats after	18	18	16
Seat change	▲2	Steady	▼6
Leader	Claude Malhuret	Mélanie Vogel	Edwige Diaz
Alliance	LIRT	GEST	UNT
Leader's seat	Allier	French citizens living abroad	Gironde
Last election	18 seats	17 seats	Did not exist
Seats before	20	16	Did not exist
Seats after	15	15	15
Seat change	▼3	▼2	▲15
President of the Senate before election
Gérard Larcher
REP
President of the Senate
Gérard Larcher
REP

Senatorial elections were held in France on 27 September 2026 to select 178 members of the French Senate in indirect elections.

== Background ==
=== 2023 Senate elections ===
The 2023 Senate election saw a weakened majority of the right-wing and centre groups, accompanied by the rise of minor groups, such as the greens and the independents. Prior to the 2026 election, the Senate is composed of three main groups: the Republicans, the Socialists, and the Centrist Union, as well as six minor groups (including unaffiliated senators). The Senate was dominated by the right-wing and centre-right with the Republicans and the Centrist Union holding 189 seats alone between them, with the main opposition coming from the Socialists with their 65 seats.

== Electoral system ==
All 348 senators in the Senate are elected by indirect election through an electoral college for six-year terms; however, elections are held every three years to renew the terms of half the senators. The 2026 election renewed the 178 seats previously elected in 2020, also called Series 2 under French electoral law. Senators are elected in constituencies corresponding to departments of France, overseas collectivities and French people living outside France, and the electoral system depends on the number of seats up for election in the constituency. If the constituency elects one or two senators, a modified two-round system is used to elect the senators. A second round is held if the winning candidate does not secure a majority of the vote and at least a quarter of all registered eligible voters. A simple plurality is needed to win the 2nd round. Should a tie occur in the second round, the older candidate shall be declared the winner. If the constituency elects three or more senators, party-list proportional representation with the highest averages method is used to elect the senators. The Electoral Code and a Ministry of the Interior circular require mayors to comply with several obligations and mandatory rules that they must fully understand.

== Senators by constituency ==
Number	Constituency	Senators
01	Ain	3
02	Aisne	3
03	Allier	2
04	Alpes-de-Haute-Provence	1
05	Hautes-Alpes	1
06	Alpes-Maritimes	5
07	Ardèche	2
08	Ardennes	2
09	Ariège	1
10	Aube	2
11	Aude	2
12	Aveyron	2
13	Bouches-du-Rhône	8
14	Calvados	3
15	Cantal	2
16	Charente	2
17	Charente-Maritime	3
18	Cher	2
19	Corrèze	2
2A	Corse-du-Sud	1
2B	Haute-Corse	1
21	Côte-d'Or	3
22	Côtes-d'Armor	3
23	Creuse	2
24	Dordogne	2
25	Doubs	3
26	Drôme	3
27	Eure	3
28	Eure-et-Loir	3
29	Finistère	4
30	Gard	3
31	Haute-Garonne	5
32	Gers	2
33	Gironde	6
34	Hérault	4
35	Ille-et-Vilaine	4
36	Indre	2
37	Indre-et-Loire	3
38	Isère	5
39	Jura	2
40	Landes	2
41	Loir-et-Cher	2
42	Loire	4
43	Haute-Loire	2
44	Loire-Atlantique	5
45	Loiret	3
46	Lot	2
47	Lot-et-Garonne	2
48	Lozère	1
49	Maine-et-Loire	4
50	Manche	3
51	Marne	3
52	Haute-Marne	2
53	Mayenne	2
54	Meurthe-et-Moselle	4
55	Meuse	2
56	Morbihan	3
57	Moselle	5
58	Nièvre	2
59	Nord	11
60	Oise	4
61	Orne	2
62	Pas-de-Calais	7
63	Puy-de-Dôme	3
64	Pyrénées-Atlantiques	3
65	Hautes-Pyrénées	2
66	Pyrénées-Orientales	2
67	Bas-Rhin	5
68	Haut-Rhin	4
69	Rhône	7
70	Haute-Saône	2
71	Saône-et-Loire	3
72	Sarthe	3
73	Savoie	2
74	Haute-Savoie	3
75	Paris	12
76	Seine-Maritime	6
77	Seine-et-Marne	6
78	Yvelines	6
79	Deux-Sèvres	2
80	Somme	3
81	Tarn	2
82	Tarn-et-Garonne	2
83	Var	4
84	Vaucluse	3
85	Vendée	3
86	Vienne	2
87	Haute-Vienne	2
88	Vosges	2
89	Yonne	2
90	Territoire de Belfort	1
91	Essonne	5
92	Hauts-de-Seine	7
93	Seine-Saint-Denis	6
94	Val-de-Marne	6
95	Val-d'Oise	5
971	Guadeloupe	3
972	Martinique	2
973	Guyane	2
974	La Réunion	4
975	Saint-Pierre-et-Miquelon	1
976	Mayotte	2
977	Saint-Barthélemy	1
978	Saint-Martin	1
986	Wallis and Futuna	1
987	French Polynesia	2
988	New Caledonia	2
	French Abroad Series 1	6
	French citizens abroad series 2	6
	Total	348

== Results ==
=== Results by political group ===
Results of the 2026 French Senate election
Parliamentary groups	Seats				
Parliamentary groups	Total before	Up	Elected	Total after	Change
Republicans (REP)	131	77	71	124	–7
Centrist Union (UC)	59	30	31	63	+4
Socialists (SOC)	64	30	29	62	–2
European Democratic and Social Rally (RDSE)	17	9	7	18	+1
Communist, Republican, Citizen and Ecologist (CRCE)	18	4	4	18	0
Rally of Democrats, Progressives and Independents (RDPI)	19	11	9	16	–3
The Independents – Republic and Territories (LIRT)	20	9	8	15	–5
Ecologists (GEST)	16	7	5	15	–1
National Union for Territories Group (UNT)	Did not exist	Did not exist	12	15	+15
Non-inscrits (RASNAG)	4	1	2	2	–2
Total	348	178	178	348	

=== Results by constituency ===
Constituency		Outgoing senator	Group	Elected senator	Group
01	Ain	Sylvie Goy-Chavent	LR	Sylvie Goy-Chavent	UNT
01	Ain	Patrick Chaize	LR	Véronique Baude	LR
01	Ain	Florence Blatrix-Contat	SER	Florence Blatrix-Contat	SER
02	Aisne	Antoine Lefèvre	LR	Antoine Lefèvre	LR
02	Aisne	Pascale Gruny	LR	Paul Mougenot	RASNAG
02	Aisne	Anne Camérac	LIRT	Nicolas Fricoteaux	RDPI
03	Allier	Bruno Rojouan	LR	Bruno Rojouan	LR
03	Allier	Claude Malhuret	LIRT	Claude Malhuret	LIRT
04	Alpes-de-Haute-Provence	Jean-Yves Roux	RDSE	Jean-Yves Roux	RDSE
05	Hautes-Alpes	Jean-Michel Arnaud	UC	Jean-Michel Arnaud	UC
06	Alpes-Maritimes	Dominique Estrosi Sassone	LR	Dominique Estrosi Sassone	LR
06	Alpes-Maritimes	Alexandra Borchio-Fontimp	LR	Alexandra Borchio-Fontimp	LR
06	Alpes-Maritimes	Henri Leroy	LR	Jean-Marc Delia	LR
06	Alpes-Maritimes	Patricia Demas	LR	Laurent Castillo	UNT
06	Alpes-Maritimes	Sandra Paire	LR	Gaëlle Frontoni	UNT
07	Ardèche	Mathieu Darnaud	LR	Mathieu Darnaud	LR
07	Ardèche	Anne Ventalon	LR	Anne Ventalon	LR
08	Ardennes	Else Joseph	LR	Else Joseph	LR
08	Ardennes	Marc Laménie	LIRT	Marc Laménie	LIRT
09	Ariège	Jean-Jacques Michau	RDSE	Jean-Jacques Michau	RDSE
10	Aube	Évelyne Perrot	UC	Valérie Bazin-Malgras	LR
10	Aube	Vanina Paoli-Gagin	LIRT	Vanina Paoli-Gagin	LIRT
11	Aude	Gisèle Jourda	SER	Claudie Faucon-Méjean	SER
11	Aude	Sébastien Pla	SER	Sébastien Pla	SER
12	Aveyron	Jean-Claude Anglars	LR	Jean-Claude Anglars	LR
12	Aveyron	Alain Marc	UC	Alain Marc	UC
13	Bouches-du-Rhône	Stéphane Ravier	RASNAG	Fabien Bravi	UNT
13	Bouches-du-Rhône	Stéphane Le Rudulier	LR	Marie-Pierre Callet	UNT
13	Bouches-du-Rhône	Valérie Boyer	LR	Valérie Boyer	LR
13	Bouches-du-Rhône	Brigitte Devésa	UC	Brigitte Devésa	UC
13	Bouches-du-Rhône	Mireille Jouve	RDSE	Renaud Muselier	UC
13	Bouches-du-Rhône	Marie-Arlette Carlotti	SER	Marie-Arlette Carlotti	SER
13	Bouches-du-Rhône	Guy Benarroche	GEST	Guy Benarroche	GEST
13	Bouches-du-Rhône	Jérémy Bacchi	CRCE-K	Jérémy Bacchi	CRCE-K
14	Calvados	Pascal Allizard	LR	François Aubey	RDSE
14	Calvados	Sonia de La Provôté	UC	Sonia de La Provôté	UC
14	Calvados	Corinne Féret	SER	Corinne Féret	SER
15	Cantal	Stéphane Sautarel	LR	Stéphane Sautarel	LR
15	Cantal	Bernard Delcros	UC	Bernard Delcros	UC
16	Charente	François Bonneau	UC	François Bonneau	UC
16	Charente	Nicole Bonnefoy	SER	Nicole Bonnefoy	SER
17	Charente-Maritime	Corinne Imbert	LR	Corinne Imbert	LR
17	Charente-Maritime	Daniel Laurent	LR	Christophe Plassard	LIRT
17	Charente-Maritime	Mickaël Vallet	SER	Mickaël Vallet	SER
18	Cher	Marie-Pierre Richer	LR	Samir Rhimini	LR
18	Cher	Rémy Pointereau	LR	Loïc Kervran	LIRT
19	Corrèze	Claude Nougein	LR	Julien Bounie	LR
19	Corrèze	Daniel Chasseing	LIRT	Pascal Coste	LR
2A	Corse-du-Sud	Jean-Jacques Panunzi	LR	Jean-Jacques Panunzi	LR
2B	Haute-Corse	Paul-Toussaint Parigi	UC	Paul-Toussaint Parigi	UC
21	Côte-d'Or	Alain Houpert	LR	Alain Houpert	LR
21	Côte-d'Or	Anne-Catherine Loisier	UC	Anne-Catherine Loisier	UC
21	Côte-d'Or	Didier Maingault	RDPI	François Rebsamen	SER
22	Côtes-d'Armor	Alain Cadec	LR	Alain Cadec	LR
22	Côtes-d'Armor	Annie Le Houérou	SER	Annie Le Houérou	SER
22	Côtes-d'Armor	Gérard Lahellec	CRCE-K	Gérard Lahellec	CRCE-K
23	Creuse	Éric Jeansannetas	SER	Bertrand Labar	LR
23	Creuse	Jean-Jacques Lozach	SER	Jean-Jacques Lozach	SER
24	Dordogne	Marie-Claude Varaillas	CRCE-K	Marie-Claude Varaillas	CRCE-K
24	Dordogne	Serge Mérillou	SER	Serge Mérillou	SER
25	Doubs	Jacques Grosperrin	LR	Jacques Grosperrin	LR
25	Doubs	Jean-François Longeot	UC	Jean-François Longeot	UC
25	Doubs	Annick Jacquemet	UC	Arnaud Marthey	SER
26	Drome	Marie-Pierre Mouton	LR	Marie-Pierre Mouton	LR
26	Drome	Bernard Buis	RDPI	Nathalie Nieson	RDPI
26	Drome	Marie-Pierre Monier	SER	Florent Brunet	LR
27	Eure	Kristina Pluchet	LR	Kristina Pluchet	LR
27	Eure	Hervé Maurey	UC	Hervé Maurey	UC
27	Eure	Nicole Duranton	RDPI	Frédéric Duché	LIRT
28	Eure-et-Loir	Chantal Deseyne	LR	Alexis Robin	LR
28	Eure-et-Loir	Daniel Guéret	LR	Virginie Quentin	LR
28	Eure-et-Loir	Albéric de Montgolfier	LR	Albéric de Montgolfier	LR
29	Finistère	Philippe Paul	LR	Patrick Leclerc	LIRT
29	Finistère	Michel Canévet	UC	Michel Canévet	UC
29	Finistère	Nadège Havet	RDPI	Nadège Havet	RDPI
29	Finistère	Jean-Luc Fichet	SER	Forough Dadkhah	SER
30	Gard	Vivette Lopez	LR	Sylvie Josserand	UNT
30	Gard	Laurent Burgoa	LR	Laurent Burgoa	LR
30	Gard	Denis Bouad	SER	Denis Bouad	SER
31	Haute-Garonne	Alain Chatillon	LR	Marc Péré	GEST
31	Haute-Garonne	Brigitte Micouleau	LR	Brigitte Micouleau	LR
31	Haute-Garonne	Pierre Médevielle	UC	Pierre Médevielle	UC
31	Haute-Garonne	Émilienne Poumirol	SER	Magali Gasto-Oustric	RDSE
31	Haute-Garonne	Claude Raynal	SER	Thierry Suaud	SER
32	Gers	Alain Duffourg	UC	Alain Duffourg	UC
32	Gers	Franck Montaugé	SER	Carole Rolando	SER
33	Gironde	Florence Lassarade	LR	Géraldine Amouroux	LR
33	Gironde	Alain Cazabonne	UC	Jacques Breillat	LIRT
33	Gironde	Nathalie Delattre	RDSE	Nathalie Delattre	RDSE
33	Gironde	Laurence Harribey	SER	Christine Bost	SER
33	Gironde	Hervé Gillé	SER	Hervé Gillé	SER
33	Gironde	Monique de Marco	GEST	Edwige Diaz	UNT
34	Hérault	Jean-Pierre Grand	LIRT	Manon Bouquin	UNT
34	Hérault	Christian Bilhac	RDSE	Julie Frêche	SER
34	Hérault	Henri Cabanel	RDSE	Joseph Francis	LR
34	Hérault	Hussein Bourgi	SER	Hussein Bourgi	SER
35	Ille-et-Vilaine	Dominique de Legge	LR	Nicolas Belloir	LR
35	Ille-et-Vilaine	Anne-Sophie Patru	UC	Françoise Gatel	UC
35	Ille-et-Vilaine	Sylvie Robert	SER	Sylvie Robert	SER
35	Ille-et-Vilaine	Daniel Salmon	GEST	Daniel Salmon	GEST
36	Indre	Nadine Bellurot	LR	Nadine Bellurot	LR
36	Indre	Frédérique Gerbaud	LR	Régis Blanchet	UC
67	Bas-Rhin	Laurence Muller-Bronn	LR	Laurence Muller-Bronn	LR
67	Bas-Rhin	Elsa Schalck	LR	Elsa Schalck	LR
67	Bas-Rhin	Marc Séné	LR	Marc Séné	LR
67	Bas-Rhin	Claude Kern	UC	Isabelle Dollinger	UC
67	Bas-Rhin	Jacques Fernique	GEST	Pernelle Richardot	SER
68	Haut-Rhin	Christian Klinger	LR	Christian Klinger	LR
68	Haut-Rhin	Sabine Drexler	LR	Sabine Drexler	LR
68	Haut-Rhin	Ludovic Haye	UC	Ludovic Haye	UC
68	Haut-Rhin	Patricia Schillinger	RDPI	Benjamin Huin	RDPI
69	Rhône and Lyon metropolitan area	Raymonde Poncet-Monge	GEST	Gabriel Amard	RASNAG
69	Rhône and Lyon metropolitan area	Thomas Dossus	GEST	Thomas Dossus	GEST
69	Rhône and Lyon metropolitan area	Gilbert-Luc Devinaz	RDSE	Christophe Guilloteau	LR
69	Rhône and Lyon metropolitan area	Bernard Fialaire	RDSE	Bernard Fialaire	RDSE
69	Rhône and Lyon metropolitan area	Catherine Di Folco	LR	Catherine Di Folco	LR
69	Rhône and Lyon metropolitan area	Paul Vidal	LR	Sébastien Michel	LR
69	Rhône and Lyon metropolitan area	Étienne Blanc	LR	Serge Berard	LR
70	Haute-Saône	Alain Joyandet	LR	Dimitri Doussot	LR
70	Haute-Saône	Olivier Rietmann	LR	Olivier Rietmann	LR
71	Saône-et-Loire	Fabien Genet	LR	Fabien Genet	LR
71	Saône-et-Loire	Marie Mercier	LR	Marie Mercier	LR
71	Saône-et-Loire	Paulette Matray	SER	Paulette Matray	SER
72	Sarthe	Jean Pierre Vogel	LR	Jean Pierre Vogel	LR
72	Sarthe	Louis-Jean de Nicolaÿ	LR	Dominique Le Mèner	LR
72	Sarthe	Thierry Cozic	SER	Thierry Cozic	SER
73	Savoie	Martine Berthet	LR	Martine Berthet	LR
73	Savoie	Cédric Vial	LR	Cédric Vial	LR
74	Haute-Savoie	Sylviane Noël	LR	Sylviane Noël	LR
74	Haute-Savoie	Loïc Hervé	UC	Loïc Hervé	UC
74	Haute-Savoie	Cyril Pellevat	UC	Cyril Pellevat	UC
76	Seine-Maritime	Agnès Canayer	LR	Agnès Canayer	LR
76	Seine-Maritime	Catherine Morin-Desailly	UC	Catherine Morin-Desailly	UC
76	Seine-Maritime	Pascal Martin	UC	Pascal Martin	UC
76	Seine-Maritime	Patrick Chauvet	UC	Léon Levasseur	UNT
76	Seine-Maritime	Didier Marie	SER	Bastien Coriton	SER
76	Seine-Maritime	Celine Brulin	CRCE-K	Celine Brulin	CRCE-K
79	Deux-Sèvres	Gilbert Favreau	LR	Marie-Pierre Missioux	LR
79	Deux-Sèvres	Philippe Mouiller	LR	Philippe Mouiller	LR
80	Somme	Laurent Somon	LR	Laurent Somon	LR
80	Somme	Stéphane Demilly	UC	Stéphane Demilly	UC
80	Somme	Rémi Cardon	SER	Rémi Cardon	SER
81	Tarn	Philippe Folliot	UC	Philippe Folliot	UC
81	Tarn	Marie-Lise Housseau	UC	Marie-Lise Housseau	UC
82	Tarn-et-Garonne	François Bonhomme	LR	François Bonhomme	LR
82	Tarn-et-Garonne	Pierre-Antoine Lévi	UC	Pierre-Antoine Lévi	UC
83	Var	Michel Bonnus	LR	Christian Simon	LR
83	Var	Françoise Dumont	LR	Françoise Dumont	LR
83	Var	Jean Bacci	LR	Franck Giletti	UNT
83	Var	André Guiol	RDSE	Carine Leroy	UNT
84	Vaucluse	Alain Milon	LR	Dominique Santoni	LR
84	Vaucluse	Jean-Baptiste Blanc	LR	Jean-Baptiste Blanc	LR
84	Vaucluse	Lucien Stanzione	SER	Thierry d'Aigremont	UNT
85	Vendée	Bruno Retailleau	LR	Bruno Retailleau	LR
85	Vendée	Didier Mandelli	LR	Maxence de Rugy	LR
85	Vendée	Annick Billon	UC	Annick Billon	UC
86	Vienne	Bruno Belin	LR	Bruno Belin	LR
86	Vienne	Marie-Jeanne Bellamy	LR	Marie-Jeanne Bellamy	LR
87	Haute-Vienne	Isabelle Briquet	SER	Isabelle Briquet	SER
87	Haute-Vienne	Christian Redon-Sarrazy	SER	Christian Redon-Sarrazy	SER
88	Vosges	Daniel Gremillet	LR	Daniel Gremillet	LR
88	Vosges	Jean Hingray	UC	Jean Hingray	UC
89	Yonne	Dominique Vérien	UC	Dominique Vérien	UC
89	Yonne	Jean-Baptiste Lemoyne	RDPI	Jean-Baptiste Lemoyne	RDPI
90	Territory of Belfort	Cédric Perrin	LR	Cédric Perrin	LR
973	French Guiana	Georges Patient	RDPI	Rodolphe Alexandre	RDPI
973	French Guiana	Marie-Laure Phinéra-Horth	RDPI	Ryan Persaud	RDPI
977	Saint-Barthélemy	Micheline Jacques	LR	Micheline Jacques	LR
978	Saint Martin	Annick Petrus	LR	Daniel Gibbs	LR
986	Wallis and Futuna	Mikaele Kulimoetoke	RDPI	Lafaele Tukumuli	RDPI
987	French Polynesia	Lana Tetuanui	UC	Lana Tetuanui	UC
987	French Polynesia	Teva Rohfritsch	RDPI	Édouard Fritch	LR
NC	French citizens living outside of France	Christophe-André Frassa	LR	Bertrand Dupont	LR
NC	French citizens living outside of France	Olivier Cadic	UC	Olivier Cadic	UC
NC	French citizens living outside of France	Samantha Cazebonne	RDPI	Marie-Ange Rousselot	RDPI
NC	French citizens living outside of France	Sophie Briante Guillemont	RDSE	Sophie Briante Guillemont	RDSE
NC	French citizens living outside of France	Yan Chantrel	SER	Yan Chantrel	SER
NC	French citizens living outside of France	Mélanie Vogel	GEST	Mélanie Vogel	GEST

=== Senators who lost reelection ===
Senator	Group	Constituency	Since
Patrick Chaize	LR	Ain	2014
Pascale Gruny	LR	Aisne	2014
Patricia Demas	LR	Alpes-Maritimes	2020
Évelyne Perrot	UC	Aube	2017
Mireille Jouve	RDSE	Bouches-du-Rhône	2014
Stéphane Ravier	RASNAG	Bouches-du-Rhône	2014
Didier Maingault	RDPI	Côte d'Or	2026
Annick Jacquemet	UC	Doubs	2020
Chantal Deseyne	LR	Eure-et-Loir	2014
Daniel Guéret	LR	Eure-et-Loir	2020
Philippe Paul	LR	Finistère	2008
Jean-Pierre Grand	LIRT	Hérault	2014
Anne-Sophie Patru	UC	Ille-et-Vilaine	2024
Frédérique Gerbaud	LR	Indre	2026
Jacques Fernique	GEST	Bas-Rhin	2020
Paul Vidal	LR	Rhône	2024
Lucien Stanzione	SER	Vaucluse	2020
Annick Petrus	LR	Saint-Martin	2020
Teva Rohfritsch	RDPI	French Polynesia	2020
Mikaele Kulimoetoke	RDPI	Wallis and Futuna	2020

== See also ==
- Elections in France
- French Senate elections
