= Marc Péré =

French politician

Senator for Haute-Garonne
- Incumbent
- Assumed office October 1, 2026
- Parliamentary group: Ecologist group

Departmental Councillor of Haute-Garonne
- Incumbent
- Assumed office June 27, 2021 Serving with Caroline Honvault
- Constituency: Canton of Toulouse-9

Mayor of L'Union
- In office April 4, 2014 – October 1, 2026
- Succeeded by: TBD

Personal details
- Born: November 5, 1962 (age 63) Paris
- Party: Independent; La France Insoumise (Associated); French Communist Party (Previously)

Marc Péré is a French politician who has severd as a Senator from Haute-Garonne.

He has previously served as the Mayor of L'Union from 2014 until 2026 and vice-president of the Toulouse Metropole for Urban Waste from 2015 until 2020.

== Career ==
Péré was born on November 5, 1962, in Paris. His family moved to Pau when he was young. His father was an employee of Elf Aquitaine.

He graduated from ENSEEIHT in Toulouse as an engineer and later worked in the French Embassy in Seoul as a scientific attaché. He later joined Sciences Po in Paris.

He began his career as an aerospace engineer in the field of Earth observation satellites. From 2011 until 2015 he held the position of managing director of the Aerospace Valley global competitiveness cluster.

He was first elected to the municipal council of L'Union in 2001. He ran for the mayorship of the commune in 2008 as a member of the French Communist Party but his list was defeated by the Miscellaneous right list and relegated to second place.

In 2010, he was selected to be one of the three representatives from L'Union to the Urban Community of Greater Toulouse, later the Toulouse Métropole.

In 2014, Péré won the commune in the second round with 43% of the vote, after merging with the list of the Socialists and winning the support of the relegated list of Gilles Hourquet. His win was one of the few flips for the left in Haute-Garonne that year.

He was subsequently re-elected in 2020 and 2026 both on independent left lists.

From 2015 until 2020, he was a vice president of the Toulouse Metropole for Urban Waste.

In the 2021 departmental elections, Péré and running mate Caroline Honvault contested the Canton of Toulouse-9. They won in the second round against the candidates of the Socialists and the Radical Left Party.

In 2026, he launched his candidacy for the 2026 French Senate elections in Haute-Garonne. His list contains representatives from La France Insoumise, The Ecologists and Generation.s, and is supported by L'Après. His list was one of the three left-wing lists running in the election, along with the list of the Communists and the list of the Socialists and Radicals.

He campaigned on issues such as healthcare and public services. He wishes to increase mobility payments and create a "Marshall Plan for public transport."

Péré was elected in a victory seen as an upset gain in a year where the left's support declined. His list came third with 13.75% and elected one senator. He joined the Ecologist group in the Senate.

The far-left party, La France Insoumise (LFI) claimed Péré's victory as a victory for the party and viewed him as the second senator elected by LFI in the election, along with Gabriel Amard from Rhône. Péré stated that he was an associated member of LFI but is an independent politician and will join the Insoumise subgroup in the Senate. According to Public Senate, he will pay 50% of the fees requested by the Ecologist group from their members and 50% of the same fees requested by the Insoumise subgroup.

In compliance with accumulation of mandate laws, Péré resigned his mayorship, but will continue to be a municipal councillor of L'Union. He will not choose his successor, instead leaving it to the municipal council.

== Personal life ==
Péré is married and the father of two children.

He is a player of Online Bridge.
