= Jean-Yves Roux =

French politician (born 1970)

Senator for Alpes-de-Haute-Provence
- Incumbent
- Assumed office 1 October 2014
- Preceded by: Claude Domeizel

Personal details
- Born: 18 January 1970 (age 56) Digne-les-Bains, France
- Party: Radical Party of the Left (2018–present)
- Other political affiliations: Socialist Party (until 2018)

Jean-Yves Roux (French pronunciation: [ʒɑ̃iv ʁu]; born 18 January 1970) is a French politician who has represented Alpes-de-Haute-Provence in the Senate since 2014. He was elected to succeed Claude Domeizel for the Socialist Party (PS), but switched to the Radical Party of the Left (PRG) in 2018 as he joined the European Democratic and Social Rally group.

Roux was elected in 2014 with 41.2% of the second-round vote in a triangular election, and re-elected in 2020 and 2026 with 65.3% and 59.9% of the first-round vote, respectively.

He has also served as a member of the Departmental Council of Alpes-de-Haute-Provence since 1998, first representing the canton of La Javie and since 2015 the canton of Seyne. He also served as mayor of Le Brusquet from 2001 to 2010 and as a member of the Regional Council of Provence-Alpes-Côte d'Azur from 2010 to 2014.
