= Bravi (surname) =

Bravi is a surname. Notable people with the surname include:

- Alessandro Alunni Bravi (born 1974), Italian lawyer and manager
- Attilio Bravi (1936–2013), Italian long jumper
- Fabien Bravi (born 1984), French politician
- Maurizio Bravi (born 1962), Italian priest
- Michele Bravi (born 1994), Italian pop singer, songwriter, and actor
