= Roland Courteau =

French politician (1943–2025)

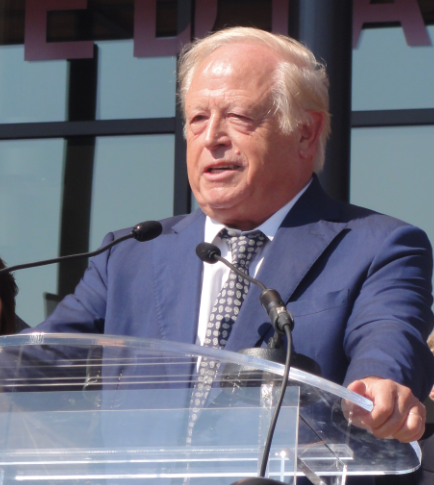

Member of the French Senate for Aude
- In office 1 October 1980 – 30 September 2020
- Succeeded by: Sébastien Pla

Personal details
- Born: 24 February 1943 Narbonne, France
- Died: 4 August 2025 (aged 82)
- Party: Socialist Party
- Profession: Teacher

Roland Courteau (French: [ʁɔlɑ̃ kuʁto]; 24 February 1943 – 4 August 2025) was a French politician who was a member of the Senate, representing the department of Aude. He was a member of the Socialist Party.

In the Senate, he sat on the Commission for Economic Affairs, and he was a member of the Delegation on the rights of women, and equality of opportunity between men and women.

Before entering the Senate in 1980, he worked as a teacher, and served as a Councillor, and Vice President on the General council of Aude.

Courteau died on 4 August 2025, at the age of 82.

== Biography ==
A teacher by training and member of the Socialist Party (France), Roland Courteau was elected senator for Aude on September 28, 1980, and re-elected on September 24, 1989, September 27, 1998, September 21, 2008, and September 28, 2014. He will not be standing for re-election in 2020. His political commitments include “violence against women,” “defending viticulture,” and “protecting the Mediterranean.”
