= Jean-Claude Carle =

French politician (1948–2019)

Member of the French Senate for Haute-Savoie
- In office 2 October 1995 – 6 August 2018
- Succeeded by: Sylviane Noël

Personal details
- Born: 9 June 1948 Chambéry, France
- Died: 13 December 2019 (aged 71) Groisy, France
- Party: UMP; The Republicans (after 2015)

Jean-Claude Carle (9 June 1948 – 13 December 2019) was a French politician. He served as a member of the Senate of France from 1995 to 2018, representing the Haute-Savoie department. He was a member of the Union for a Popular Movement.

Prior to joining the Senate, Carle was involved in local politics, first as a councilor on the Regional council of Rhône-Alpes And later as a councilor for the department of Haute-Savoie. He won his Senate seat in the 2014 French Senate election and was re-elected in 2004 and 2014. In 2018, he resigned his seat to make way for Sylviane Noël, who became the first woman Senator from Haute-Savoie.

Carle died on 13 December 2019 at the age of 71.
