= Departmental Council of Haute-Garonne =

Departmental Legislature in France

Departmental Council of Haute-Garonne Conseil départemental de la Haute-Garonne

Leadership
- President: Sébastien Vincini, PS since 13 December 2022

Structure
- Seats: 54
- Political groups: Government (48): PS (31); DVG (6); G.S (4); PCF (3); PRG (2); MRC (1); PP (1); Opposition (6): UDI (3); DVD (1); DVG (1); LR (1); www.haute-garonne.fr

The Departmental Council of Haute-Garonne (French: Conseil départemental de la Haute-Garonne; Occitan: Conselh Departamental de Nauta Garona) is the deliberative assembly of the department of Haute-Garonne in the region of Occitanie. It consists of 54 members (general councilors) from 27 cantons and its headquarters are in Toulouse.

The president of the General Council is Sébastien Vincini.

== See also ==
- Haute-Garonne
- General councils of France
