= Ecologist group (Senate) =

Parliamentary group in the French Senate

Ecologist group in the Senate Groupe écologiste du Sénat
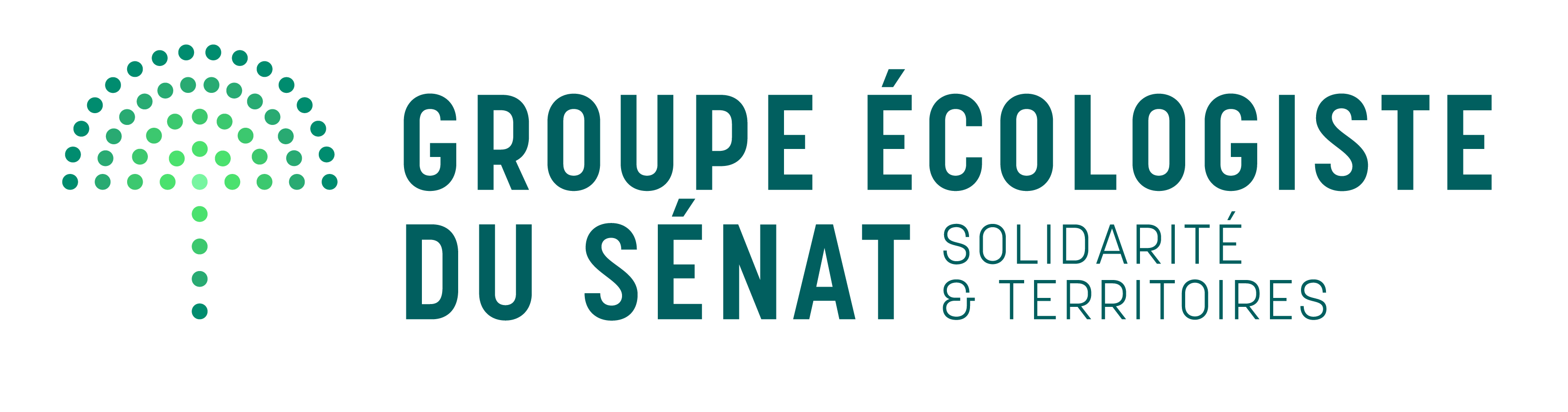
- Chamber: Senate
- Foundation: 11 January 2012 (1st); 29 September 2020 (2nd)
- Member parties: Europe Ecology – The Greens; Femu a Corsica; Génération.s; Territoires44
- President: Mélanie Vogel
- Constituency: French citizens living abroad
- Representation: 15 / 348
- Ideology: Green politics
- Website: http://ecologistes-senat.fr/

The Ecologist group in the Senate (French: Groupe écologiste du Sénat) is a parliamentary group in the French Senate. Its first formation was from 11 January 2012 to 29 June 2017 that included representatives of Europe Ecology – The Greens (EELV). It was recreated on 29 September 2020.

== History ==
The number of senators of Europe Ecology – The Greens (EELV) increased from 4 to 10 following the 2011 renewal in which the left took control of the Senate for the first time in the history of the Fifth Republic. Fifteen senators were then required for the formation of a group in the Senate; the threshold was lowered to 10 as a result of an earlier agreement between EELV and the Socialist Party (PS). The ecologist group was officially founded on 11 January 2012 after previously being attached to the socialist group, with Jean-Vincent Placé serving as its first president. After the appointment of Socialists Nicole Bricq and Hélène Conway-Mouret to the government, ecologists Hélène Lipietz and Kalliopi Ango Ela entered the Senate to become the 11th and 12th members of the group. After the rout of the socialists in the 2014 municipal elections, Prime Minister Jean-Marc Ayrault presented the resignation of his government, reducing the ecologist group to 10 deputies once more as Bricq and Conway-Mouret returned to their seats in the Senate.

Placé remained president of the group until his appointment to the government, with Corinne Bouchoux taking his place on 15 February 2016, having previously co-chaired the group from 6 November to 13 December 2015. Placé's departure left the ecologists with only nine deputies, threatening the continued existence of the group; a few days before the deadline, however, Hervé Poher, associated senator of the socialist group, joined the ecologist group, ensuring its survival. Bouchoux concluded her term as president of the group on 3 May 2016, becoming a Secretary of the Bureau of the Senate, and was succeeded in her post by Jean Desessard on 4 May. With André Gattolin joining some 25 senators in forming the La République En Marche group on 27 June, however, the ecologist group once again fell below the requisite number to constitute a group and was dissolved, with Desessard's term as president officially ending on 29 June.

== List of presidents ==
Name	Term start	Term end	Notes
Jean-Vincent Placé	11 January 2012	6 November 2015	
Jean-Vincent Placé, Corinne Bouchoux	6 November 2015	13 December 2015	
Jean-Vincent Placé	13 December 2015	15 February 2016	
Corinne Bouchoux	15 February 2016	3 May 2016	
Jean Desessard	4 May 2016	29 June 2017	
Guillaume Gontard	29 September 2020	30 September 2026	
Mélanie Vogel	1 October 2026		

== Historical membership ==
Year	Seats	Change	Series	Notes
2011	10 / 348	New	1	
2014	10 / 348	Steady	2	
2017	0 / 348	▼10	1	
2020	12 / 348	▲12	2	
2023	17 / 348	▲5	1	
2026	15 / 348	▼2	2	
