= French Senate elections =

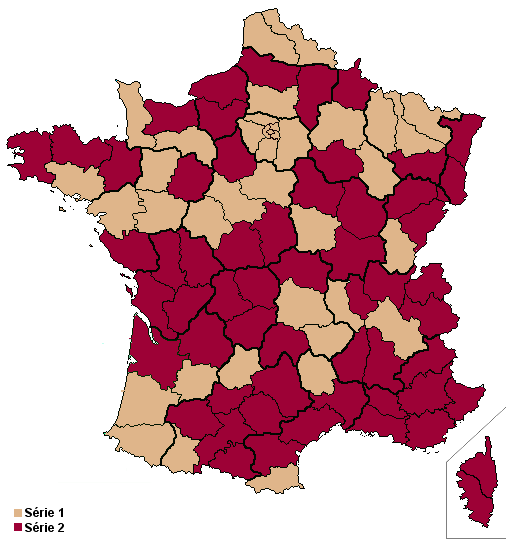
Department distribution since 2008

Senators in France are elected by indirect universal suffrage, by a panel of "electors". Half of the Senate seats are up for election every three years; the term of office is six years.

The last elections were held on 24 September 2023 for series 1 and 27 September 2026 for series 2.

== Third Republic ==
The law of 24 February 1875 on the organization of the Senate, created the Senate of the Third Republic. It required that the Senate be composed of 300 members, of which 225 were elected by the departments and colonies, and 75 were elected by the National Assembly to serve for life. Some of them were still senators well after the law of 10 December 1884 no longer allowed senators to be appointed by the National Assembly. The last irremovable senator (inamovible in French), Émile Deshayes de Marcère, died in 1918. There were a total of 116 irremovable senators.

== Fifth Republic ==
In 2000, Parliament passed a law to move to a proportional list in the departments with three or more senators, and an increase in the number of delegates for large municipalities, but this measure was vetoed by the Constitutional Council because the Senate is to represent the local authorities.

In 2003, the term of office changed from nine years to six years. Senators were no longer elected by thirds but by halves, and the two series are elected three years apart. The minimum age was reduced from 35 to 30 years, proportional representation began applying only to departments with four or more senators.

In 2005, the term of office of all senators was extended for one year, to put the senate elections right after the municipal elections.

In 2011, the minimum age for senators was decreased from 30 to 24 years.

In 2012, Commission sur la rénovation et la déontologie de la vie publique (Committee on elections and ethics in public life) led by Lionel Jospin made several proposals to Parliament: ensure a fairer representation of local authorities in the Senate using a weighted vote of electors and removing deputies from the electoral college, extending the use of proportional representation for the election of senators and lowering to 18 the minimum age of eligibility the Senate. Only the extension of proportional representation to Departments of three senators or more and is retained, as well as increasing the number of delegates from the major cities in a law enacted in 2013. The mode of election of overseas senators is reformed.

== Current system ==
The number of elected senators in the departments is 348, the elected senators in other communes is 8 and there are 12 senators representing French outside France.

Except where specified otherwise, this section describes only the method of electing senators for departments. This section is up to date with changes as of 2013.

Number of delegates per capita in 2013
Inhabitants	No. communes	Population	No. of delegates per commune	No. delegates	No. per delegates	No. of additional delegates per commune (law before 2013)	No. per delegates in total (before Law 2013)	No. of additional delegates per commune (after the 2013 law)	No. per delegates in total (after law of 2013)
1–499	20,009	4,545,018	1	20,009	227	0	227	0	227
500–1,499	10,003	8,578,800	3	30,009	286	0	286	0	286
1,500–2,499	2604	5,008,589	5	13,020	385	0	385	0	385
2,500–3,499	1171	3,459,030	7	8197	422	0	422	0	422
3,500–4,999	919	3,814,639	15	13785	277	0	277	0	277
5,000–8,999	990	6,539,169	15	14,850	440	0	440	0	440
9,000–9,999	121	1,152,482	29	3509	328	0	328	0	328
10,000–19,999	511	7,092,875	33	16,863	421	0	421	0	421
20,000–29,999	187	4,591,362	35	6545	702	0	702	0	702
30,000–39,999	83	2,855,224	39	3237	882	323	802	420	781
40,000–49,999	54	2,376,423	43	2322	1023	733	778	919	733
50,000–59,999	41	2,223,473	45	1845	1205	973	789	1223	725
60,000–79,999	27	1,852,676	49	1323	1400	1031	787	1290	709
80,000–99,999	16	1,409,989	53	848	1663	923	796	1154	704
100,000–149,999	24	2,986,955	55	1320	2263	2255	836	2822	721
150,000–199,999	6	998,130	59	354	2820	815	854	1020	726
200,000–249,999	3	673,895	61	183	3682	853	880	728	740
250,000–299,999	3	814,103	65	195	4175	722	888	904	741
300,000+	5	4,343,009	69	475	9187	4211	931	5264	760
Total	36,777	65,336,841		138,889	470	12,569	431	15,744	423

=== In departments ===
Senators are elected in each department by an electoral college consisting of:

1. deputies and senators;
2. regional councillors of the departmental section for the department (as appropriate, advisers of the Corsican Assembly, councilors at the meeting of Guyana, (Note: Applicable after the merger of the General Council and regional council in March 2014.) counselors at the Martinique Assembly);
3. departmental councillors;
4. delegates of municipal councils or alternates to these delegates; (Note: The municipal council delegates comprise 95% of the departmental electoratal college.)
  - Local councils elect one of their members in municipalities with fewer than 9,000 inhabitants:
    - 1 delegate for municipal councils of 7 and 11 members (less than 500 inhabitants);
    - 3 delegates for the municipal councils of 15 members (less than 1500 inhabitants);
    - 5 delegates for the municipal councils of 19 members (less than 2500 inhabitants);
    - 7 delegates to the municipal councils of 23 members (less than 3500);
    - 15 delegates for 27 municipal councils and 29 members (less than 9000 inhabitants).
  - In the communes of 9000 or more inhabitants, all councillors are representatives by law. In addition, in the municipalities of over 30,000 inhabitants, municipal councils elect additional delegates at 1 for every 800 inhabitants in excess of 30,000. In practice, the additional delegates are often permanent, activists or supporters of political parties, employees of elected officials, relatives or friends.

=== In New Caledonia, French Polynesia and Wallis and Futuna ===
Senators are elected by an electoral college consisting of:

- In New Caledonia:
  1. Deputies;
  2. Members of Provincial Assemblies;
  3. Delegates of municipal councils or substitutes for these delegates.
- In French Polynesia:
  1. Deputies;
  2. Members of the Assembly of French Polynesia;
  3. municipal councilors or their substitutes.
- In Wallis and Futuna:
  1. Deputies;
  2. Members of the Territorial Assembly.

=== In Mayotte, Saint-Barthélemy, Saint-Martin and Saint Pierre and Miquelon ===
Senators are elected by an electoral college consisting of:

- From the department of Mayotte:
  1. Deputies;
  2. general councilors;
  3. municipal councilors or their alternates.
- From Saint-Barthélemy:
  1. Deputies;
  2. territorial councilors.
- In St. Martin:
  1. Deputies;
  2. territorial councilors.
- In Saint Pierre and Miquelon:
  1. Deputies;
  2. territorial councilors;
  3. municipal councilors or their alternates.

=== French citizens abroad ===
Since the law of 22 July 2013, senators representing French citizens abroad are elected by a panel formed from:

1. Deputies elected by French citizens abroad;
2. Consular advisers;
3. Consular delegates.

In the event that a consular counselor or consular representative is also a member elected by French expatriates, a replacement is appointed him on his presentation, the President of the Assembly of French Citizens Abroad.

=== Eligibility ===
The procedures for electing Senators are set in the Electoral Code. Being an elector has the same conditions as being a Senator, except that the minimum age is 24 years.

Any Senate candidate must be a French national to run for these offices and "No one can be elected if he has not satisfied the obligations imposed by the Code of National Service" (translated), adults subject to guardianship or trusteeship are ineligible.

The office of senator can not be combined with that of a Deputy, a member of the European Parliament, a member of the French government, a member of the Constitutional Council, or of the French Economic, Social and Environmental Council.

The office of Senator can not be combined with military service, or the exercise of more than one of the following offices: Regional Adviser, member of the Corsican Assembly, general councillor, councilor to Paris, or councillor of a town of at least 3500 inhabitants; the constitutional ombudsman and Comptroller General of prisons are ineligible during their term of office; Prefects of France are ineligible in any constituency included in whole or in part within the jurisdiction in which they hold or have held office for up to three years from the date of the poll (non-exhaustive list).

A draft organic law presented by the Cabinet on April 3, 2013, seeks to prohibit the accumulation of local executive functions with the office of Deputy or Senator starting March 31, 2017.

=== Organization of elections ===
In departments where two or one senators are elected, the election is a majority vote in two rounds. To be elected in the first round, a candidate must receive an absolute majority of votes cast and a number of votes equal to at least a quarter of registered voters. In the second ballot, a simple majority suffices. In case of a tie, the older candidate is elected. Each candidate runs with a replacement of different gender.

In departments where three or more senators are elected, the election takes place using proportional representation following the rule of the highest average, without panachage or preferential voting. On each list, seats are allocated to candidates based on their order in the list.

Electors are required to vote, a fine of 100 Euro must be paid in the event of an unjustified abstention. Delegates who voted, and voters of law who do not receive compensation for their duties receive a travel allowance.

=== Replacement of senators ===
Senators whose seat becomes vacant due to death, accepting a position with the government, the Constitutional Council or Defender, or the extension beyond the six months of a temporary mission entrusted by the government are replaced. If Senator was elected by a majority vote, the elected replacement takes his or her place. In the case of proportional representation, the first unelected candidate from the same list as the Senator is the replacement

In case of cancellation of the elections, in the event of a vacancy other than those mentioned above, the procedure is to hold elections within three months. It is not, however, preceded by any election in the year before partial election of the Senate.
