= Vanina Paoli-Gagin =

French lawyer and politician

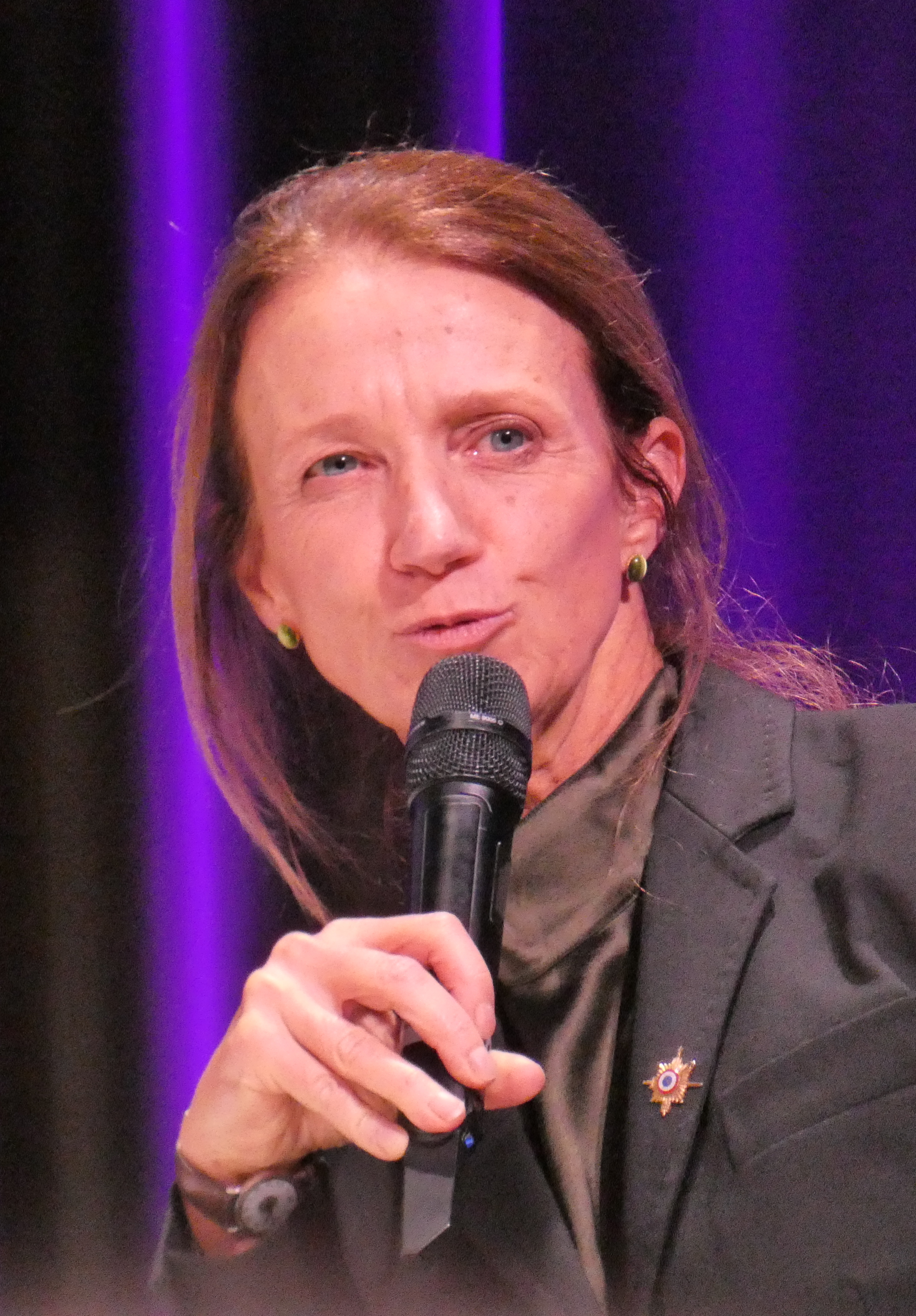
- Vanina Paoli-Gagin in 2024.

Member of the French Senate
- Incumbent
- Assumed office 27 September 2020
- Constituency: Aube

Personal details
- Born: 25 January 1967 (age 59) Troyes, France
- Party: LIRT
- Education: Paris Descartes University

Vanina Paoli-Gagin (born 25 January 1967) is a French lawyer and politician. In 2020, she was elected to the Senate to represent the department of Aube.

== Biography ==
She defended her doctoral thesis in law in 1996 on securities commissions and then practiced as a lawyer at the Paris bar, specializing in business law.

From January 1990, Vanina Paoli-Gagin held the position of parliamentary assistant to Philippe Adnot, senator of Aube and secretary general of RASNAG from 1998 to 2020, the group of non-affiliated senators.

In the 2020 French Senate election, Philippe Adnot did not run again and gave his place to Vanina Paoli-Gagin; however, Adnot was her substitute for the elections and the pair won in the second round against Gérard Menuel.
