= Pierre Médevielle =

French politician (born 1960)

Pierre Médevielle (born April 17, 1960) is a French politician. He has served as a member of the Senate of France since 2014, representing the Haute-Garonne department. He is a member of The Independents – Republic and Territories group.
