= Cyril Pellevat =

French politician (born 1981)

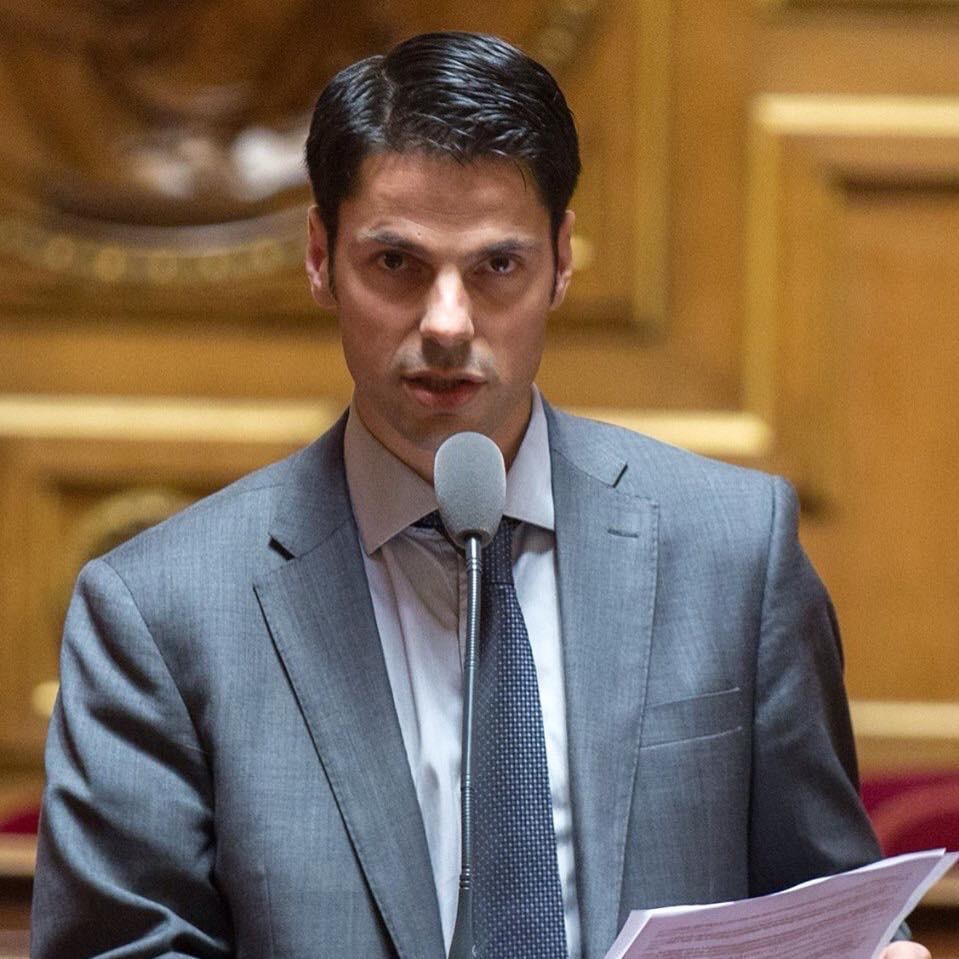
- Pellevat in 2014

Senator for Haute-Savoie
- Incumbent
- Assumed office 1 October 2014

Member of the Regional Council of Auvergne-Rhône-Alpes
- Incumbent
- Assumed office 4 January 2016

Mayor of Arthaz-Pont-Notre-Dame
- In office 16 March 2008 – 31 August 2016
- Preceded by: Yves Rosset
- Succeeded by: Alain Ciabattini

Personal details
- Born: 18 February 1981 (age 45) Annemasse, France
- Party: Union for a Popular Movement (until 2015); The Republicans (2015–present)

Cyril Pellevat (French pronunciation: [siʁil pɛlva]; born 18 February 1981) is a French politician who has served as a Senator for Haute-Savoie since 2014. A member of The Republicans (LR), he left the Senate Republicans in 2025 to sit with The Independents – Republic and Territories.

Pellevat has also been a member of the Regional Council of Auvergne-Rhône-Alpes since 2016. He previously held the mayorship of Arthaz-Pont-Notre-Dame from 2008 to 2016 as well as a vice presidency of the communauté de communes Arve et Salève from 2008 to 2014.
