= Hussein Bourgi =

French politician

Senator for Hérault
- Incumbent
- Assumed office October 1, 2020
- Parliamentary group: Socialist group in the Senate

Regional Councillor of Occitania
- Incumbent
- Assumed office January 4, 2016
- Constituency: Hérault

Personal details
- Born: October 5, 1973 (age 52) Dakar, Senegal
- Party: PS

Hussein Bourgi (born October 5, 1973, in Dakar) is a French Politician and Senator for the Hérault department.

== Biography ==
Bourgi was born in Dakar, Senegal, he is of Lebanese origin.

In 1992, Bourgi moved to Montpellier to study law. He later became president of the local National Union of Students of France – Independent and Democratic in 1993 and became a member of the Young Socialists

Bourgi became a member of the Montpellier Women's Rights Vigilance Committee and Montpellier Lesbian and Gay Pride in 1995 and 1997 respectively.

In 1997, he co-founded the Collectif contre l'homophobie (Collective Against Homophobia) which he became president of two years later.

Since 2005, Bourgi has been vice-president of the Réseau d'aide aux victimes d'agression et de discrimination (Assault and Discrimination Support Network) who assist victims of violence and discrimination against LGBTQ people.

He was elected federal secretary of the Socialist Party in Hérault in 2012. And became a Regional Councillor of Occitania in the 2015 election.

In the 2020 French Senate election in Hérault, Bourgi was placed on the top of the list of the Socialist Party and was elected with 22% of the vote.

In November 2023, Bourgi presented a bill in the Senate that would allow for the rehabilitation and compensation of people convicted of homosexuality in France between 1942 and 1982.

Bourgi became the founding vice-president of the refounded L’Association des amis du Félibrige et de la langue d’oc au Sénat (Association of Friends of the Félibrige and the Langue d'Oc in the Senate).

He was reelected comfortably in the 2026 French Senate election at the top of the Socialist list.

== Personal life ==
The LGBTQ magazine Têtu has presented him as an "openly gay activist."
