= Nadège Havet =

French politician (born 1975)

Member of the Senate
- Incumbent
- Assumed office 1 October 2020
- Constituency: Finistère

Personal details
- Born: 30 November 1975 (age 50)
- Party: Renaissance

Nadège Havet (born 30 November 1975) is a French politician serving as a member of the Senate since 2020. From 2008 to 2020, she served as deputy mayor of Saint-Pabu.

== Biography ==
Second on the centrist list led by Michel Canevet, she was elected senator for Finistère in September 2020 and sits with the RDPI (LREM) group. In 2017, she was the deputy for Didier Le Gac, LREM member of parliament.

In 2021, she relayed amendments proposed by the Breton Association of Agri-Food Industries to the Senate as part of the proposed law on the protection of whistleblowers.
