= Sophie Briante Guillemont =

French politician (born 1991)

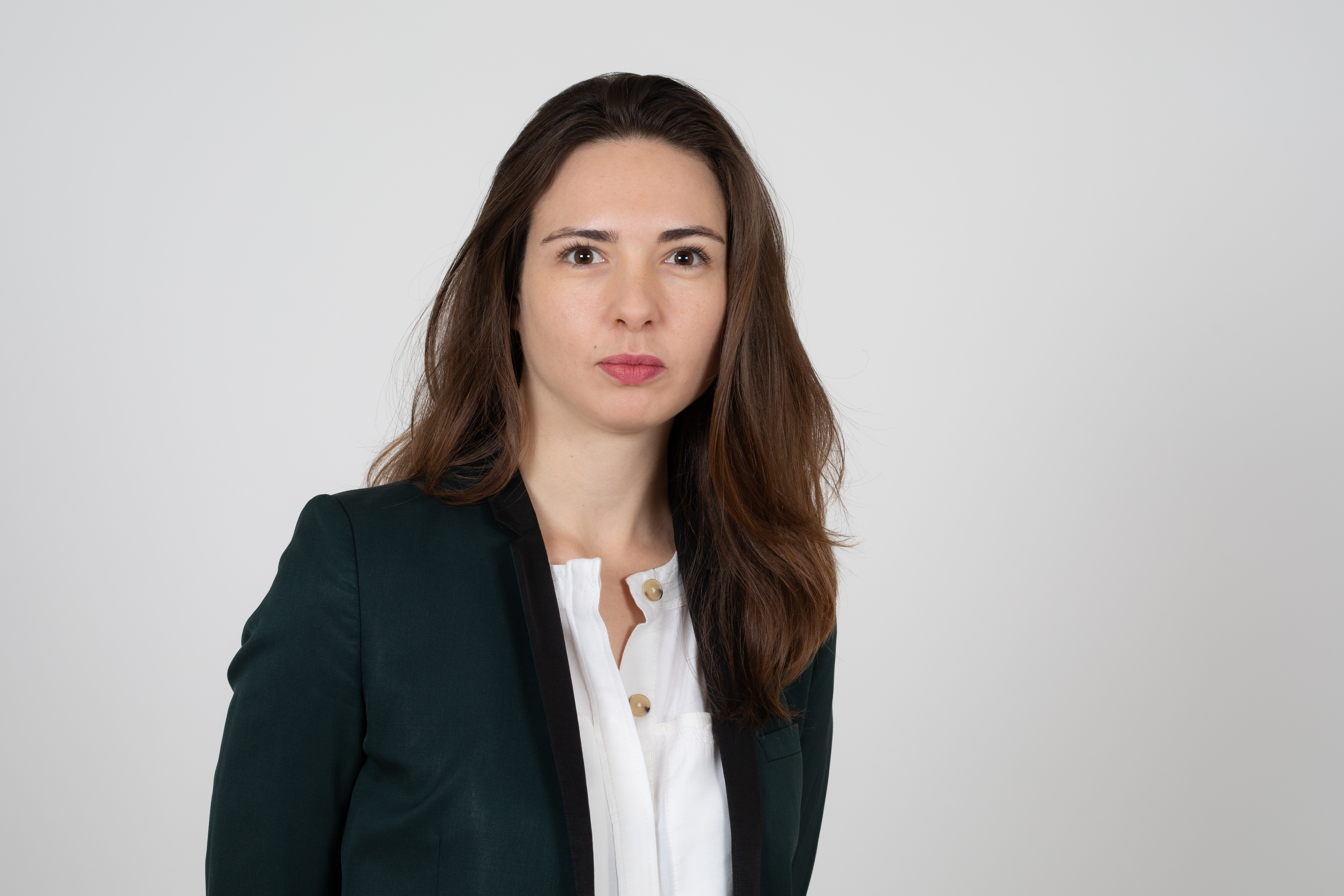

Member of the Senate
- Incumbent
- Assumed office 17 August 2024
- Preceded by: Jean-Pierre Bansard
- Constituency: French citizens living abroad

Personal details
- Born: 27 September 1991 (age 34)
- Party: ASFE
- Other political affiliations: European Democratic and Social Rally group

Sophie Briante Guillemont (born 27 September 1991) is a French lawyer and politician serving as a member of the Senate since 2024. She has served as secretary general of the Alliance solidaire des Français de l'étranger since 2019.
