= Mickaël Vallet =

French politician (born 1979)

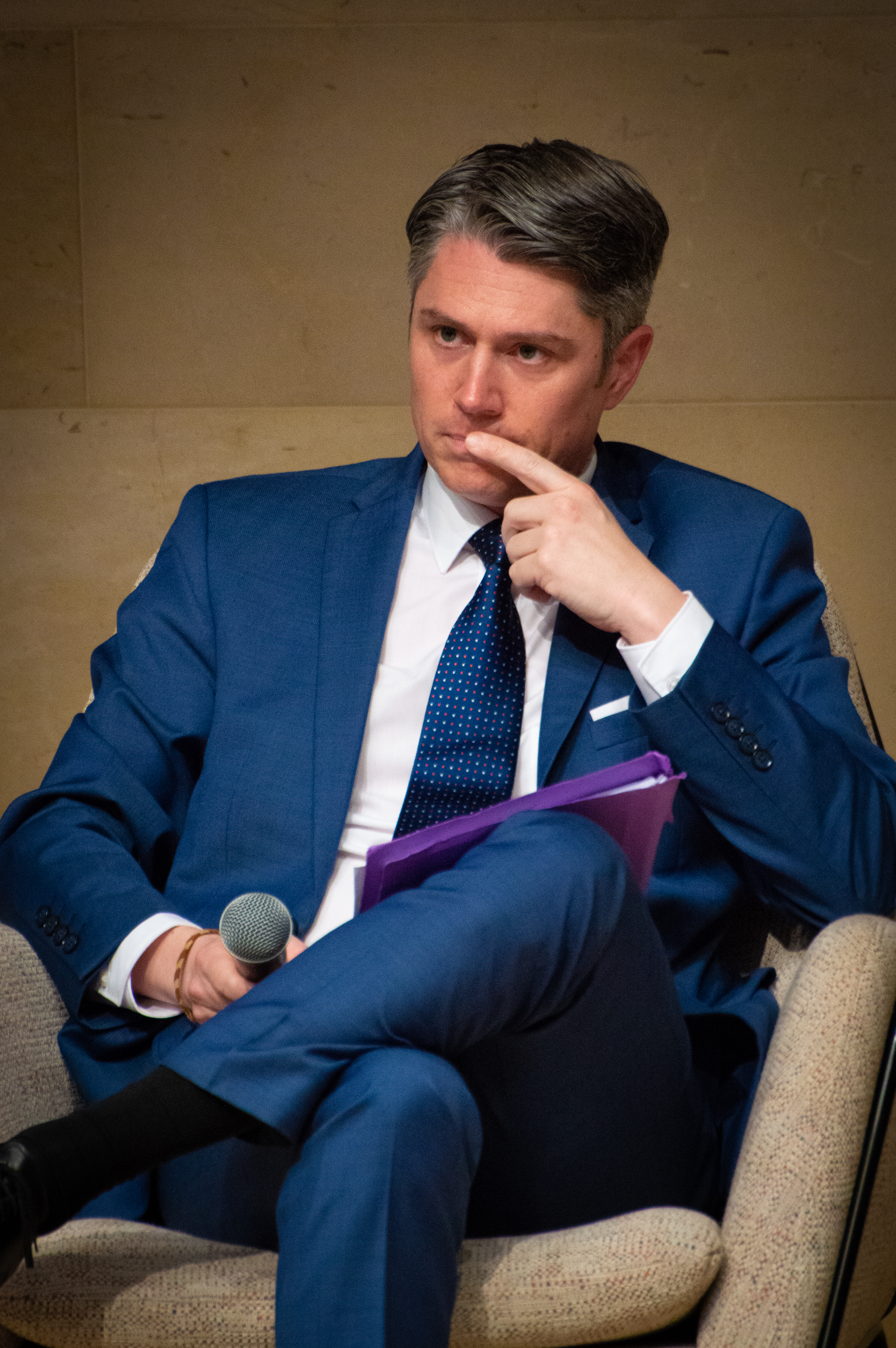
- Vallet in 2023

Member of the Senate
- Incumbent
- Assumed office 1 October 2020
- Constituency: Charente-Maritime

Personal details
- Born: 26 May 1979 (age 46)
- Party: Socialist Party (since 2007)

Mickaël Vallet (born 26 May 1979) is a French politician serving as a member of the Senate since 2020. He previously served as mayor of Marennes and Marennes-Hiers-Brouage.
