= Jean Hingray =

French politician (born 1986)

Member of the Senate
- Incumbent
- Assumed office 1 October 2020
- Constituency: Vosges

Mayor of Remiremont
- In office 23 November 2016 – 17 October 2020
- Preceded by: Bernard Godfroy
- Succeeded by: Jean-Benoît Tisserand

Personal details
- Born: 19 July 1986 (age 39)
- Party: Union of Democrats and Independents

Jean Hingray (born 19 July 1986) is a French politician of the Union of Democrats and Independents. He has been a member of the Senate since 2020, and served as mayor of Remiremont from 2016 to 2020.
