= Jérémy Bacchi =

French politician (born 1986)

Member of the Senate
- Incumbent
- Assumed office 1 October 2020
- Constituency: Bouches-du-Rhône

Personal details
- Born: 8 March 1986 (age 40)
- Party: French Communist Party

Jérémy Bacchi (born 8 March 1986) is a French politician of the French Communist Party. He has been a member of the Senate since 2020, and has served as leader of the Communist Party in Bouches-du-Rhône since 2017.
