= Elsa Schalck =

French politician (born 1986)

Member of the Senate
- Incumbent
- Assumed office 1 October 2020
- Constituency: Bas-Rhin

Personal details
- Born: 4 December 1986 (age 39)
- Party: The Republicans

Elsa Schalck (born 4 December 1986) is a French politician of The Republicans. Since 2020, she has been a member of the Senate. She is a member of the city council of Strasbourg and the metropolitan council of the Eurométropole de Strasbourg, and previously served as regional councillor of Alsace and as vice president of the Regional Council of Grand Est. In the 2017 legislative election, she was a candidate for Bas-Rhin's 1st constituency.
