= Alexandra Borchio-Fontimp =

French politician (born 1981)

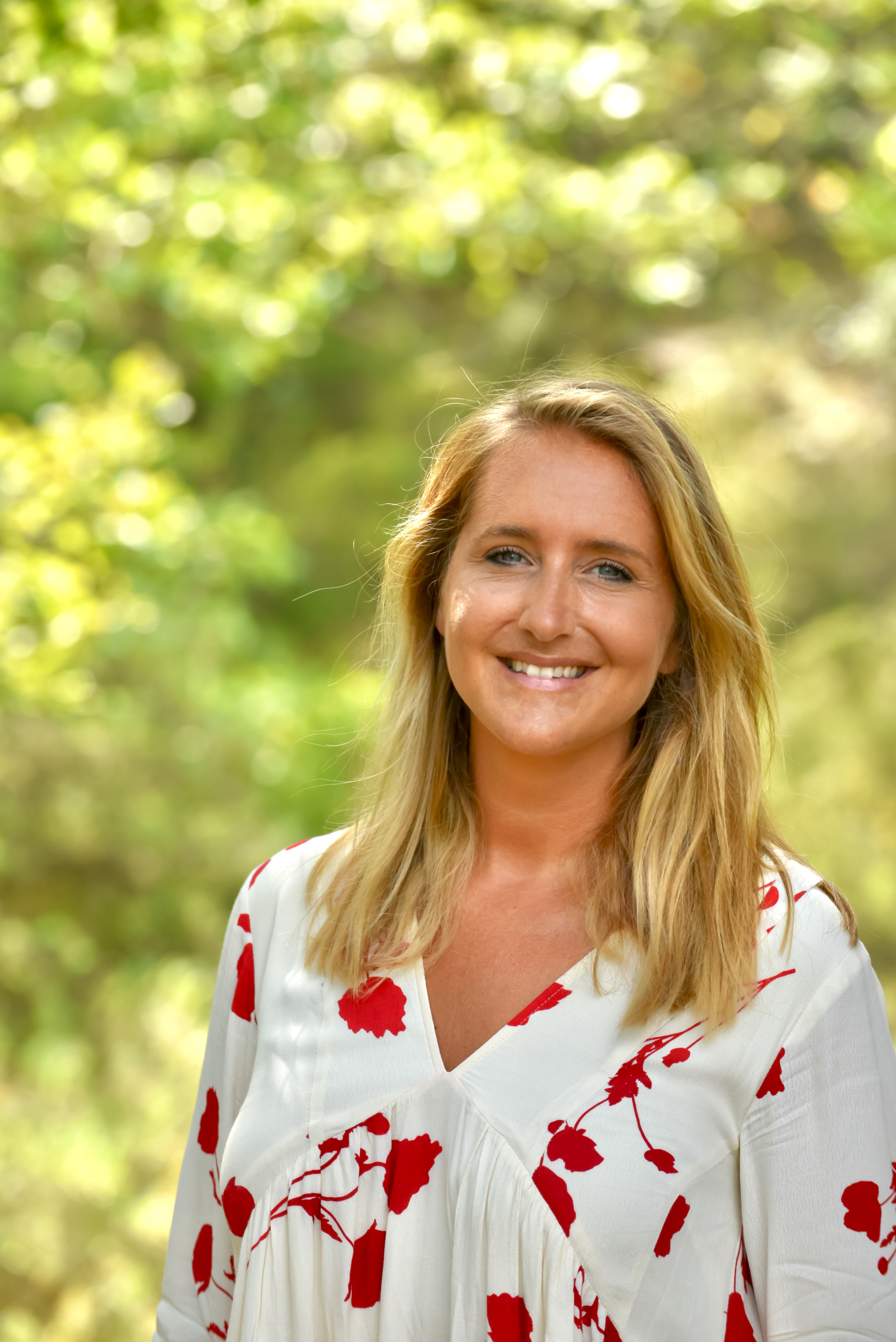

Member of the French Senate for Alpes-Maritimes
- Incumbent
- Assumed office 1 October 2020

Personal details
- Born: 5 October 1981 (age 44) Antibes, Alpes-Maritimes, France
- Party: UMP (2008–2015); LR (since 2015)
- Occupation: French senator and departmental councilor of the alpes maritimes department (antibes-2 district)

Alexandra Borchio Fontimp (born 5 October 1981 in Antibes, Alpes-Maritimes) is a French journalist and a politician.

She belongs to the French political party Les Républicains, she represents the party as a Senator, in the French Parliament, since 1 October 2020.

Alexandra Borchio Fontimp is also a member of the Departmental Council of Alpes-Maritimes since 2015. She was elected in Antibes canton-2, together with Jacques Gente.

Under-secretary-general of Les Républicains since 2019, she became the party's spokesperson on 18 January 2023, following the victory in the polls of Eric Ciotti to assume the party presidency.

== Biography ==
=== Early life ===
Alexandra Borchio Fontimp was born in Antibes in a local family named Fechino.

Her mother, Martine Fechino, was a retailer in Antibes while her father, Sergio Borchio, was an Italian hairdresser working in Cannes. Her grandfather, Pierre Fechino used to be a professional football player in the early 1930s. As a AS Cannes's member, he won the Coupe de France in 1932. Retired, he became an electrician, well known in the old town. Alexandra Borchio Fontimp also has a brother named Alexandre Borchio born in Antibes in 1977.

Alexandra Borchio Fontimp attended school in Antibes Juan-le-Pins until she obtained her baccalauréat (High school diploma) in Economics. She studied at Audiberti highschool. Her marriage with Fabrice Fontimp in 2007 led to the birth of two children, Chloé Fontimp on 26 September 2008 and then to Thomas Fontimp on 13 January 2011.

=== Professional career ===
Alexandra Borchio Fontimp began her professional career as a journalist covering French local news in the Alpes-Maritimes. She became reporter and editor in 2005 thanks to her graduation following the obtention of her master's degree named "Information and communication sciences" issued by the Faculty of Arts in Nice.

She invested herself in politics during 2008, first as a member of the French right-wing party, UMP and then as an advisor in the municipal council of Vallauris Golfe-Juan.

In 2015, she is working part-time in the Provencale radio Kiss FM, covering the French Riviera and the Mercantour’s area as head of business partnerships.

In 2017, when Eric Pauget is elected as deputy (MP) in the Alpes Maritimes’s seventh district, she became her deputy substitute.

=== Political career ===
Alexandra Borchio Fontimp, candidate in the French senatorial elections, became Senator of Alpes-Maritimes on 27 September 2020.

She is a member of the French Senate's "Culture, Education and Communication" commission and "Women's Rights" delegation, she holds two mandates. A national mandate at the Palais du Luxembourg and a local mandate in the Alpes-Maritimes department.

Furthermore, due to her commitment to the fight against violence towards women and for her implication for the equality between women and men, she was appointed a member of the French High Council for Equality in 2019.

Following the COVID-19 pandemic, the senator takes up the cause of students without a master's degree. From the rostrum of the Senate, she questioned the Minister of Higher Education, at that time Frédérique Vidal, on the situation of thousands of students who find themselves without access to a master's degree for the next academic year.

She declares then that "The Republic shall not tolerate a nebulous system telling our youth that they're not qualified.”

On 28 September 2022, Alexandra Borchio Fontimp, Laurence Cohen and Laurence Rossignol were assigned rapporteur of women's right and gender equality delegation. Together, they exposed to the media their Senate committee report condemning sexual abuse in the French pornography industry. The following resolution was unanimously voted favorably by the assembly, an unprecedented event in the history of the fifth republic.

During July 2022, she publicly called for laws to be introduced to extend legal protection to traditional French recipes, such as salade niçoise, to prevent restaurants or food manufacturers from altering their recipes.

=== Local mandates ===
Alexandra Borchio Fontimp was a candidate in the 2015 departmental elections and has since been a member of the departmental majority, chaired by Charles Ange Ginesy.

Chairwoman of the "Education, Research and Higher Education" commission, she was also elected vice-president of the Côte d'Azur France regional tourism committee, destined to promote tourism in the French riviera. She is also head of the "gender equality" delegation.

Alexandra Borchio Fontimp is elected president of the Alpes-Maritimes territorial hospital group in 2019 and vice-president of the French hospital federation in 2019.

Together with Jacques Gente, she became a departmental councillor, elected with 68.19% of the votes cast in the Antibes-2 canton. Afterwards, she takes on the presidency of the "Education and Smart Deal" commission. On 13 January 2022, Alexandra Borchio Fontimp succeeded David Lisnard as head of the Côte d'Azur France regional tourism committee, of which she had already been vice-president since 2015.

=== Associative activity ===
Alexandra Borchio Fontimp is committed to education and helping sick children, and became patron of the Adrien association in 2013. She is also a volunteer with the Red Cross, where she organizes a number of rounds of assistance for the homeless.

== Mandate details ==
=== At the French Senate ===
· Since 27 September 2020 : Senator of Alpes-Maritimes

=== On a local level ===
2008 – 2014: Vallauris town councillor

2014 – 2020: Antibes Juan-les-Pins town councillor in charge of youth affairs

28 June 2020 – 27 September 2020: Deputy Mayor of Antibes Juan-les-Pins in charge of Economic Affairs

since 2015: Alpes-Maritimes departmental councillor (Antibes-2 canton) and vice-president of the Côte d'Azur France regional tourism committee

since January 2022: President, regional tourism committee, French Riviera

=== Within political parties ===
· 2019: appointed "deputy general secretary" of the Les Républicains party

· September 2021: appointed campaign manager for Éric Ciotti's Les Républicains congress

· December 2021: appointed deputy director of Valérie Pécresse's 2022 presidential campaign

· October 2022: appointed campaign manager for Éric Ciotti's campaign for the presidency of the Républicains

· since 18 January 2023: appointed spokesperson for Les Républicains
