= Rémi Cardon =

French-Portuguese politician (born 1994)

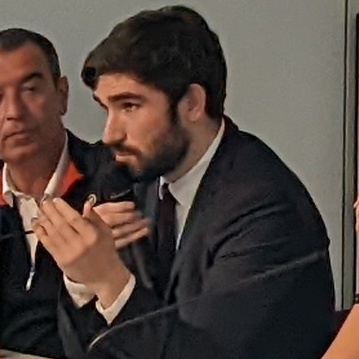
- Cardon in 2022

Member of the Senate
- Incumbent
- Assumed office 1 October 2020
- Constituency: Somme

Personal details
- Born: 3 May 1994 (age 31)
- Party: Socialist Party

Rémi Cardon (born 3 May 1994) is a French politician of the Socialist Party serving as a member of the Senate. He was elected in the 2020 Senate election at the age of 26, becoming the youngest-ever senator of the Fifth Republic. He is also a municipal councillor of Camon and the leader of the Socialist Party in Somme. In the 2019 European Parliament election, he was a candidate for member of the European Parliament.
