= Sébastien Vincini =

French politician (born 1978)

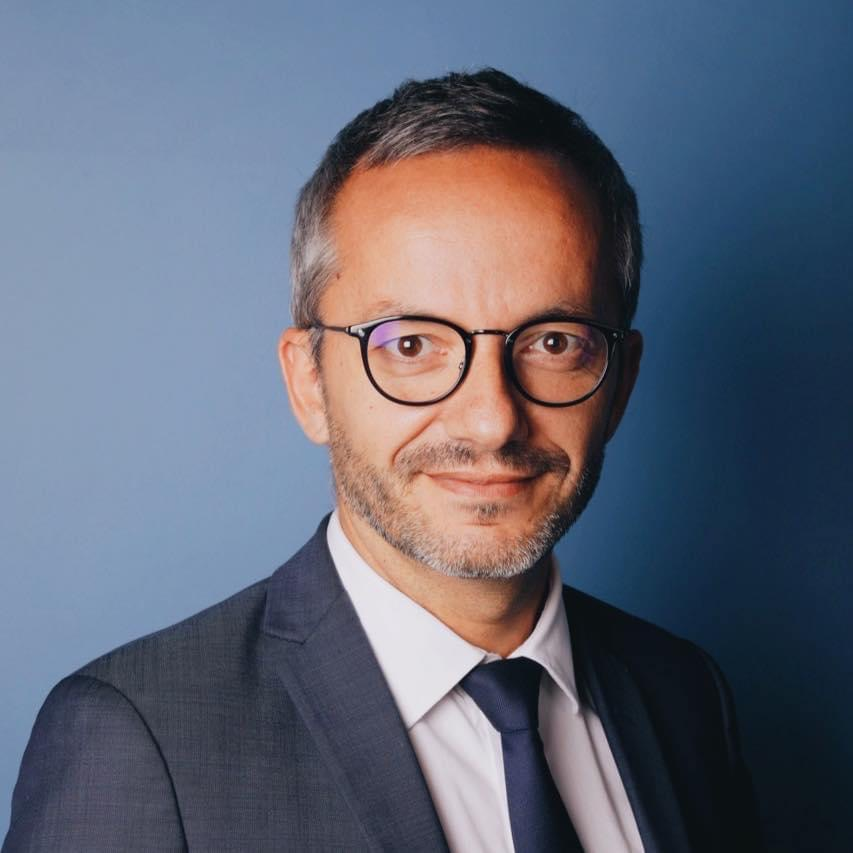
- Vincini in 2022

President of the Departmental Council of Haute-Garonne
- Incumbent
- Assumed office 13 December 2022
- Preceded by: Georges Méric

Personal details
- Born: 25 March 1978 (age 48)
- Party: Socialist Party

Sébastien Vincini (born 25 March 1978) is a French politician serving as president of the departmental council of Haute-Garonne since 2022. From 2020 to 2022, he served as mayor of Cintegabelle. From 2014 to 2022, he was the leader of the Socialist Party in Haute-Garonne.
