= Thomas Dossus =

French politician (born 1982)

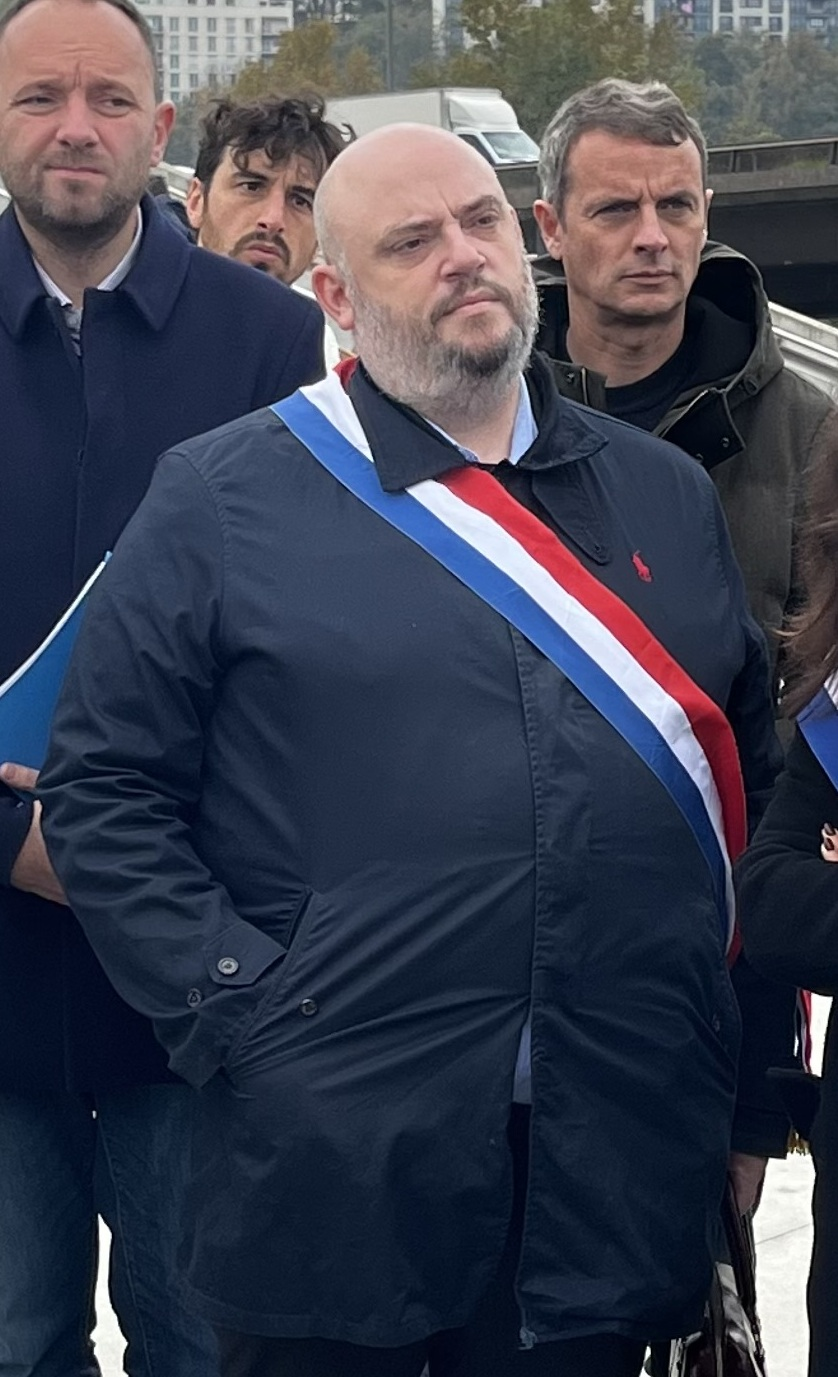
- Dossus in 2024

Senator for Rhône
- Incumbent
- Assumed office 1 October 2020

Personal details
- Born: 28 July 1982 (age 43)
- Party: The Ecologists

Thomas Dossus (French pronunciation: [tɔma dosy]; born 28 July 1982) is a French politician of The Ecologists who has represented Rhône in the Senate since 2020. Until his election to the Senate, he was a member of the Metropolitan Council of Lyon and served as a deputy mayor of the 7th arrondissement of Lyon.
