= André Guiol =

French politician (born 1954)

André Guiol (born June 28, 1954) is a French politician. He has served as a member of the Senate of France since 2020, representing Var.
