= Cédric Vial =

French politician (born 1978)

Senator for Savoie
- Incumbent
- Assumed office 1 October 2020

Member of the Regional Council of Auvergne-Rhône-Alpes
- Incumbent
- Assumed office 11 October 2018

Mayor of Les Échelles
- In office March 2008 – 6 November 2020
- Preceded by: Jacques Verney
- Succeeded by: Myriam Cattanéo

Personal details
- Born: 25 March 1978 (age 48)
- Party: The Republicans (until 2017); Independent (2017–present)
- Other political affiliations: Miscellaneous right
- Education: Joseph Fourier University

Cédric Vial (French pronunciation: [sedʁik vjal]; born 25 March 1978) is a French politician who has served as a Senator for Savoie since 2020. A former member of The Republicans (LR), which he left in 2017, he sits with the Senate Republicans. Since 2018 and the resignation of Patrick Mignola, he has also been a member of the Regional Council of Auvergne-Rhône-Alpes.

Previously, Vial held the mayorship of Les Échelles from 2008 to 2020, after one term as deputy mayor (2001–2008). From July to October 2020, he briefly presided over the Communauté de communes Cœur de Chartreuse.
