= Jean Desessard =

French politician (born 1952)

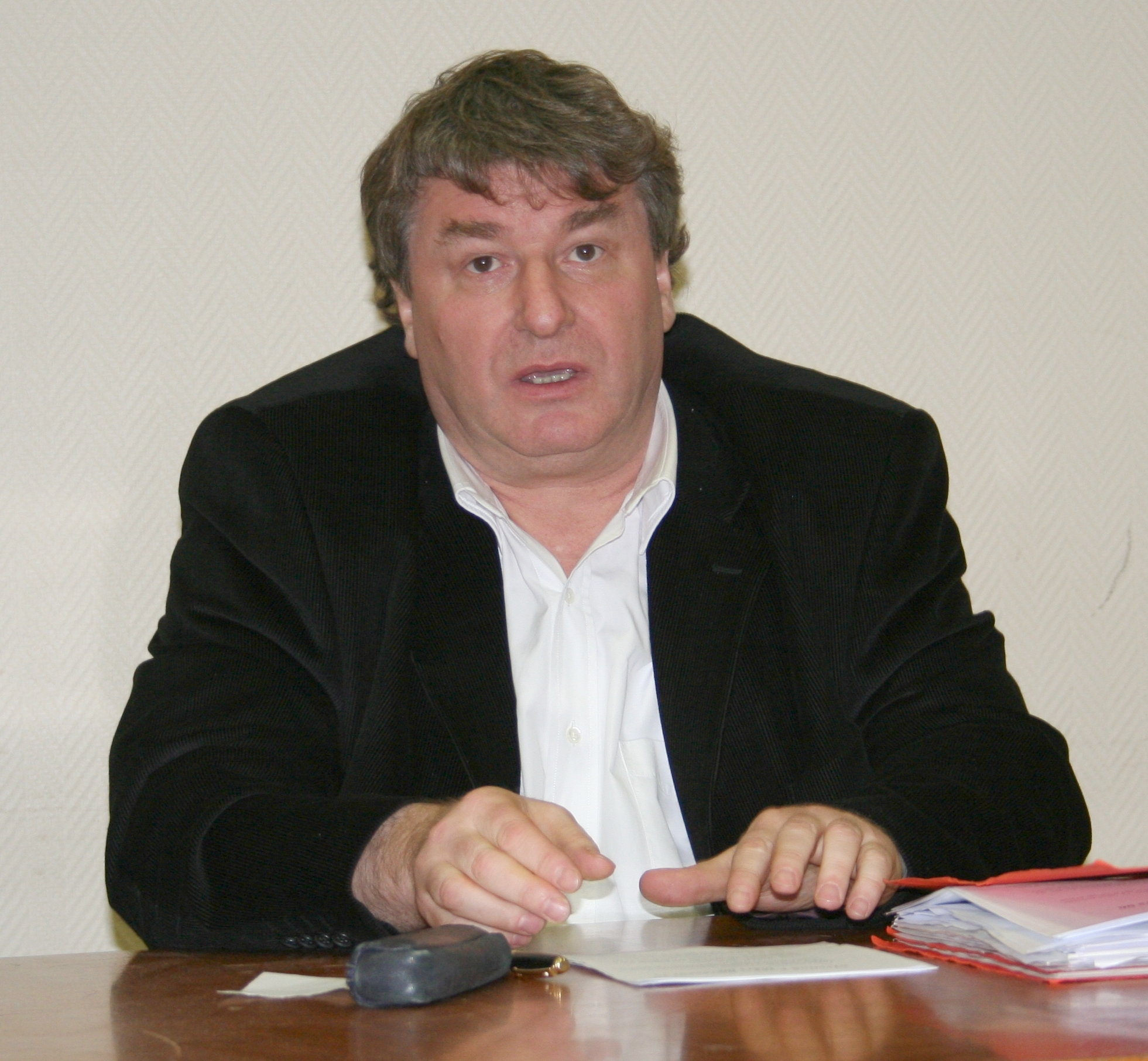
Jean Desessard

Jean Desessard (born 6 September 1952) is a French politician and a former member of the Senate of France from 2004 to 2017. He represented Paris and is a member of Europe Ecology – The Greens.
