= President of the Senate (France) =

Head of the French Senate

- Senate logo

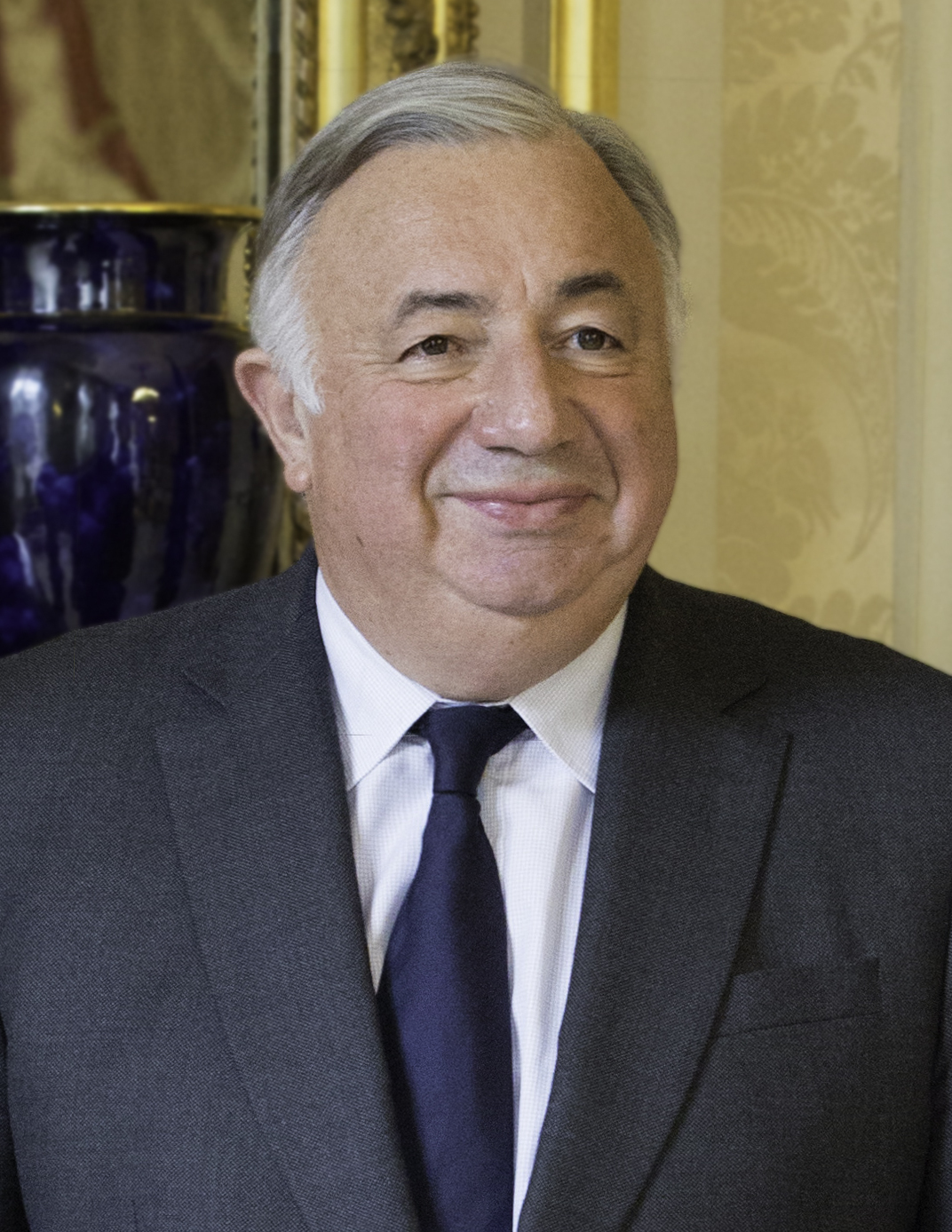
- Incumbent; Gérard Larcher since 1 October 2014
- Style: Mr. President
- Residence: Petit Luxembourg, Paris
- First holder: Gaston Monnerville
- Website: www.senat.fr/vos-senateurs/presidence-du-senat.html

The President of the Senate (French: Président du Sénat) presides over the Senate, the upper house of the French Parliament.

He is the third highest-ranking state official, after the President of the Republic (for whom he acts as acting president when necessary), and the Prime Minister, and before the President of the National Assembly, the lower house of Parliament. As such, he has considerable powers of appointment.

In the Senate, he presides over plenary sessions and can influence the legislative process. He chairs the Senate Bureau and the Conference of Presidents, which is responsible for organizing legislative work.

The presidency of the Senate, colloquially known as "le plateau" (a term equivalent to "perch" for the presidency of the National Assembly), takes its name from the rostrum where the presiding officer sits in the hemicycle.

The current President of the Senate has been Gérard Larcher since 2014.

== Election ==
The President of the Senate is elected by all senators every three years, following each partial renewal of the chamber, from among its sitting members. The session is chaired by the oldest senator until the election of the new president, who takes office immediately and presides over the rest of the session. An interim committee, composed of the eldest senator and the six youngest, conducts the secret ballot.

During his term of office, the President of the Senate is assisted by 25 senators, appointed immediately after him. Together, they form the Senate Bureau (Bureau du Sénat).

== Role and responsibilities ==
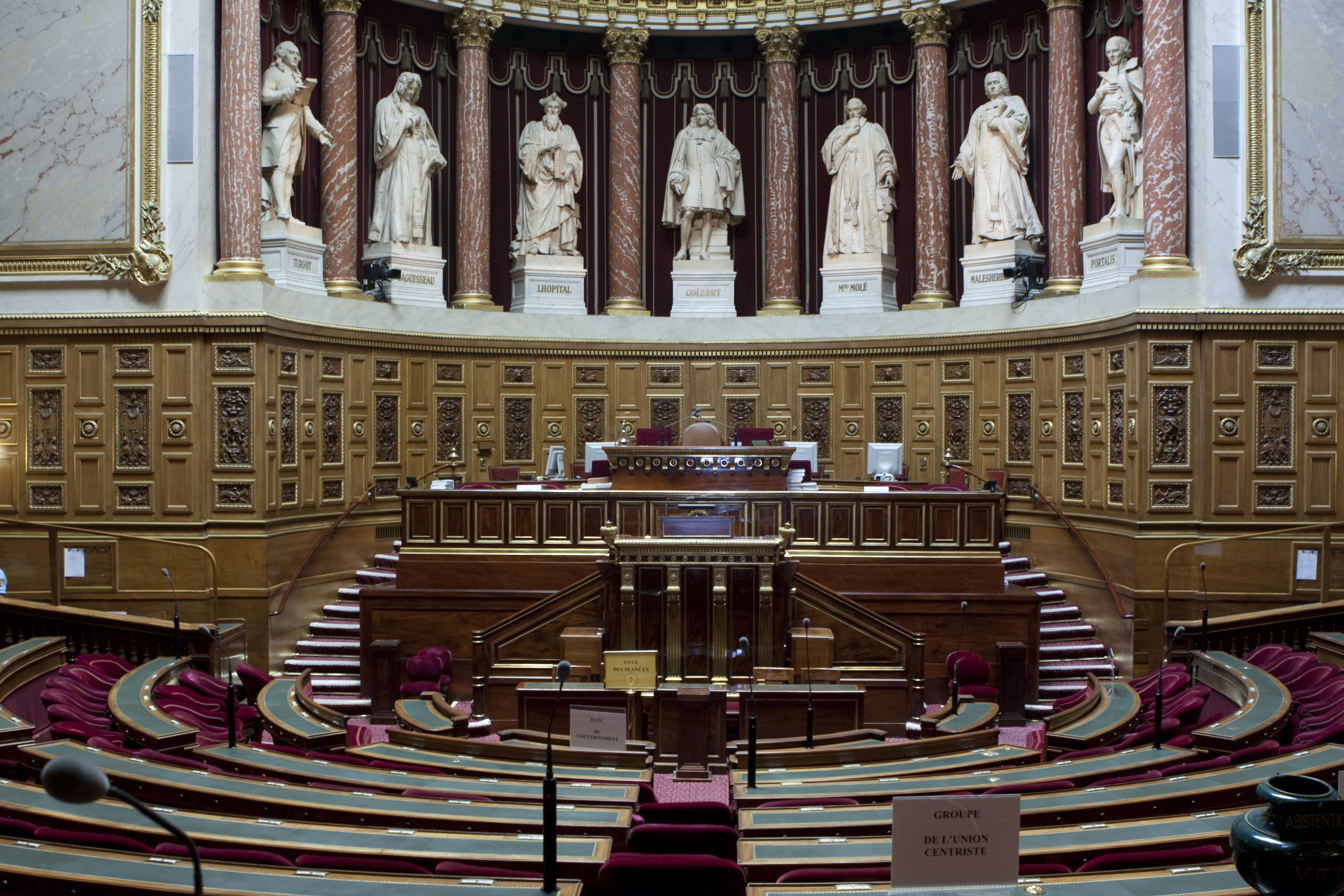
The tribune of the President of the Senate, colloquially known as the "plateau".

The role of the President is to represent the Senate and direct its debates. He chairs the Conference of Presidents, which includes the leaders of political groups and committees, and is responsible for setting the agenda for plenary sessions. He must be consulted by the President of the Republic when the latter wishes to dissolve the National Assembly or use exceptional powers (article 16 of the French Constitution).

The President of the Senate acts as interim President of the Republic if the office becomes vacant due to death, resignation, incapacity, or dismissal. However, during this interim period, he may not dissolve the National Assembly, call a referendum, or initiate constitutional revisions. This interim power is then exercised until the newly-elected President of the Republic is sworn in (Article 7 of the French Constitution). This occurred twice in the Fifth Republic: first in 1969, after Charles de Gaulle's resignation, and again in 1974, following Georges Pompidou's death. On both occasions, Alain Poher served as interim President. During this interim period, the President of the Senate is the highest-ranking official in the order of precedence.

The President of the Senate appoints:

- 3 of the 9 members of the Constitutional Council;
- 2 of the 8 members of the Conseil supérieur de la magistrature;
- 3 of the 7 members of the Autorité de régulation des communications électroniques et des postes;
- 1 of the 7 members of the Autorité de régulation des activités ferroviaires;
- 1 of the 3 members of the Autorité des marchés financiers;
- 3 of the 7 members of the Conseil supérieur de l'audiovisuel;
- 2 of the 9 members of the Haut Conseil de l'éducation;
- 1 of the 5 commissioners of the Nuclear Safety Authority.

== Order of protocol and presidential succession ==
The President of the Senate is sometimes portrayed as the second-ranking state official after the President of the Republic. This error is due to a misinterpretation of Article 7 of the Constitution, which states that in the event of "vacancy of the Presidency of the Republic for any reason whatsoever", the President of the Senate "provisionally exercises the functions" of Head of State. He is thus the first person in the order of presidential succession, which is not the same as the order of protocol. The confusion may also be due to historical factors, as under the Third Republic, the President of the Senate was more important than under the Fifth Republic.

Under the Fifth Republic, it is the Prime Minister who is the second-ranking State official, with the President of the Senate in third place, ahead of the President of the National Assembly. The only rule of law in this area is the current decree of 13 September 1989, on the order of precedence in France relating to public ceremonies, precedence, and civil and military honors: this decree effectively assigns the second rank in the State to the Prime Minister, ahead of the President of the Senate. Its application can be seen when the State's most senior figures are gathered together, for example at July 14th ceremonies, when the Prime Minister is placed closest to the President of the Republic. Academic Didier Maus also points out that, in the absence of the Head of State, the Council of Ministers is chaired by the Prime Minister rather than the President of the Senate, further proof of the former's pre-eminence.

According to Guy Carcassonne, this order of protocol, instituted in 1958, reflects the pre-eminence of the executive over the legislature that Charles de Gaulle wanted in the Fifth Republic. Additionally, in 1958, the President of the National Assembly should have ranked higher than the President of the Senate, as the former presides over a chamber that has the final authority on legislation. Consequently, the President of the Senate would have been the fourth highest-ranking state official. However, the influence of the President of the Republic’s interim powers resulted in the President of the Senate being placed third, rather than fourth, in the order of precedence.

== Remuneration and benefits ==
In 2019, the President of the Senate received a gross monthly salary of 7,239.91 euros as Senator and 7,196.46 euros as President.

The President of the Senate is provided with 80 m² of accommodation in the Petit Luxembourg, a private mansion adjoining the Palais du Luxembourg, a chauffeur-driven car, and bodyguards.

== List of Presidents of the Senate ==
Under the Fifth Republic, Gaston Monnerville was the first President of the Senate, from 1958 to 1968, after having been President of the Conseil de la République from 1947 to 1958. Alain Poher succeeded him in 1968. In this capacity, he served as interim President of the French Republic in 1969 and 1974. He did not stand for re-election for a ninth term in 1992 but holds the record for the longest tenure of any French senator (24 years).

René Monory, Christian Poncelet, and Gérard Larcher held the post between 1992 and 2011, the year the left achieved a majority in the Senate for the first time in its history: Jean-Pierre Bel thus became the first Socialist to preside over the "plateau". After the 2014 renewal, which resulted in a Senate majority for the right-wing parties, Larcher returned to the presidency of the upper house, becoming the first Senate president under the Fifth Republic to serve two non-consecutive terms. He was re-elected in 2017, 2020 and 2023.

== See also ==
- French Parliament
- List of presidents of the National Assembly of France
- List of presidents of the Senate of France
