= Yan Chantrel =

French politician (born 1979)

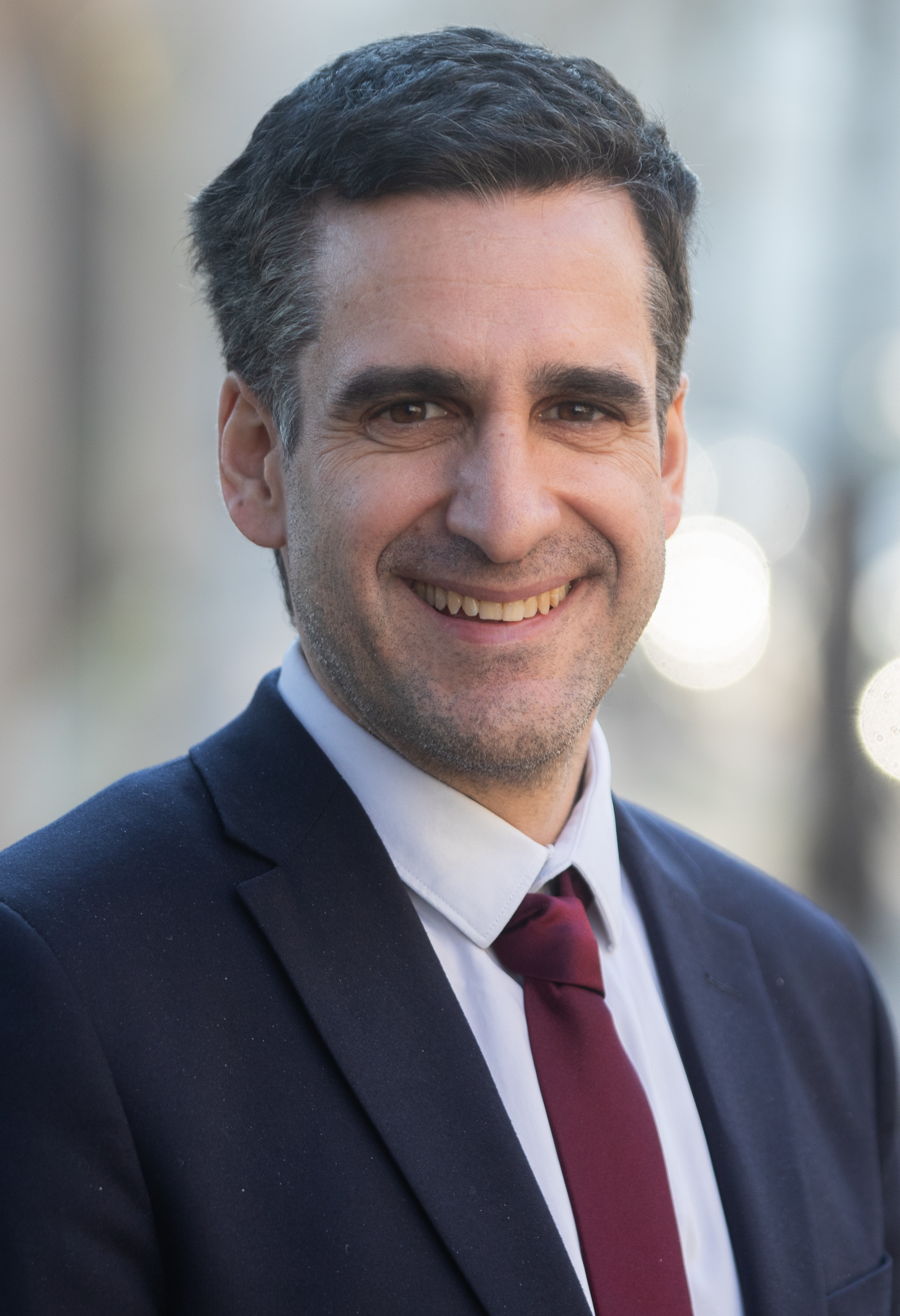
- Chantrel in 2022

Member of the Senate
- Incumbent
- Assumed office 1 October 2021
- Constituency: French citizens living abroad

Personal details
- Born: 14 April 1979 (age 47)
- Party: Socialist Party

Yan Chantrel (born 14 April 1979) is a French politician serving as a member of the Senate since 2021. In the 2017 legislative election, he was a candidate for the National Assembly in the first constituency for citizens abroad.
