= Claude Malhuret =

French politician (born 1950)

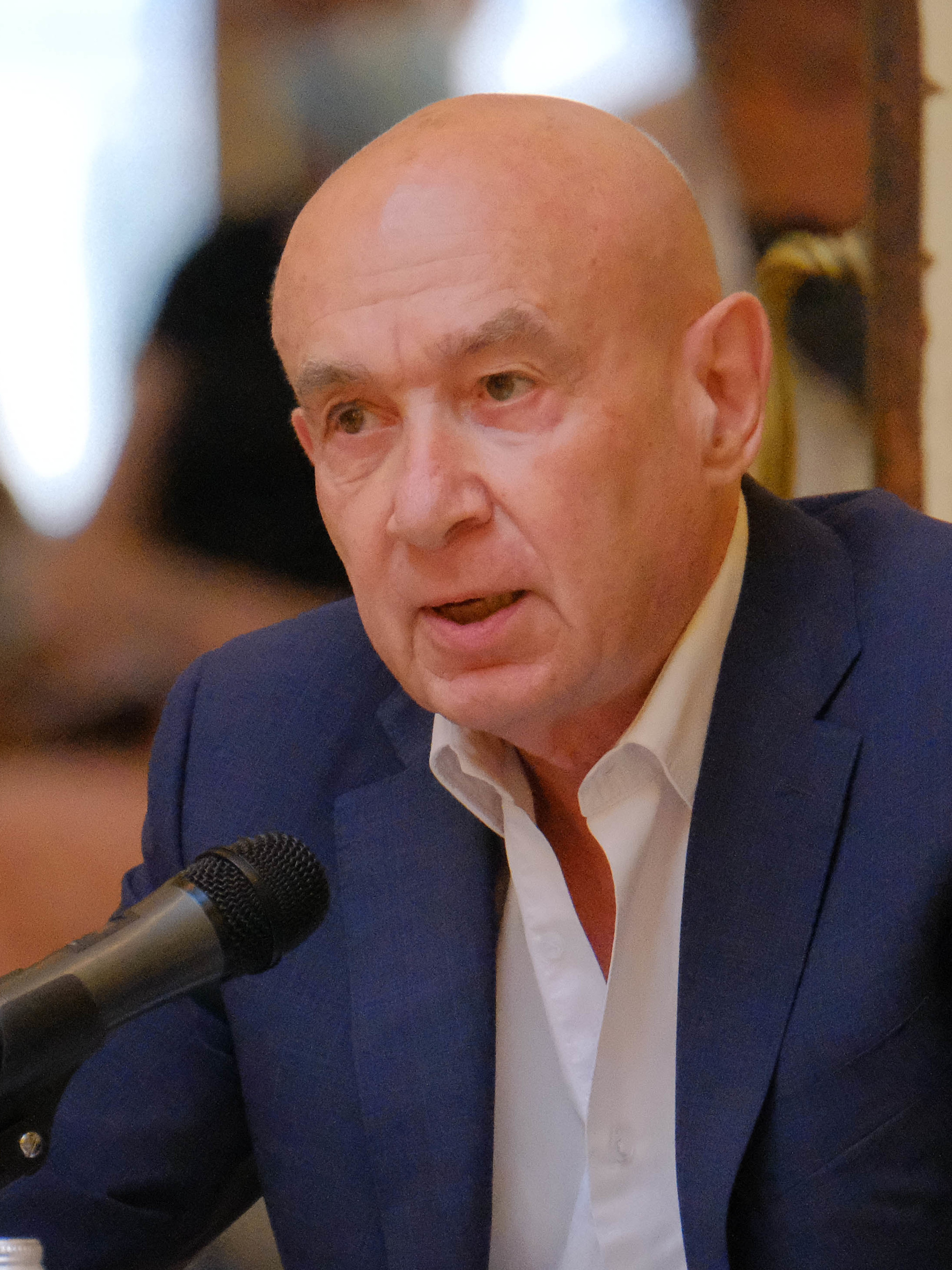
- Malhuret in 2020

Member of the Senate
- Incumbent
- Assumed office 1 October 2014
- Preceded by: Mireille Schurch
- Parliamentary group: UMP (2014–2015); LR (2015–2017); LIRT (2017–present)
- Constituency: Allier

Mayor of Vichy
- In office 20 March 1989 – 6 October 2017
- Preceded by: Jacques Lacarin
- Succeeded by: Frédéric Aguilera

Member of the Regional Council of Auvergne
- In office 29 March 2004 – 1 October 2014
- President: Pierre-Noël Bonté; René Souchon
- Constituency: Allier

Member of the National Assembly
- In office 2 April 1993 – 21 April 1997
- Preceded by: Jean-Michel Belorgey
- Succeeded by: Gérard Charasse
- Parliamentary group: UDFC
- Constituency: Allier's 4th

Member of the European Parliament
- In office 25 July 1989 – 16 April 1993
- Parliamentary group: ELD
- Constituency: France

Secretary of State for Human Rights
- In office 20 March 1986 – 10 May 1988
- Prime Minister: Jacques Chirac
- Preceded by: Office established
- Succeeded by: Lucette Michaux-Chevry (1993)

Personal details
- Born: 8 March 1950 (age 76) Strasbourg, France
- Party: Horizons (2021–present)
- Other political affiliations: Republican Party (until 1997); Liberal Democracy (1997–2002); Union for a Popular Movement (2002–2015); The Republicans (2015–2017); Agir (2017–2022)
- Education: Paris 1 Panthéon-Sorbonne University; Paris Descartes University
- Profession: Physician, lawyer, politician

Claude Malhuret (French pronunciation: [klod malyʁɛ]; born 8 March 1950) is a French physician, lawyer and politician who has served as a member of the Senate since 2014, representing the department of Allier. A member of Horizons (HOR), he has presided over the centre-right The Independents – Republic and Territories (LIRT) parliamentary group in the Senate since 2017.

Previously, Malhuret was Secretary of State for Human Rights (1986–1988), Mayor of Vichy (1989–2017), a member of the National Assembly (1993–1997) and of the European Parliament (1989–1993).

== Early life and career ==
Malhuret was born in Strasbourg. After completing his doctorate in medicine at the University of Paris, he worked as a hospital intern. In 1973, Malhuret participated in some voluntary overseas work with Coopération Française, before being employed by the World Health Organization in India.

Malhuret also studied law at the University of Paris.

Malhuret was elected president of Médecins Sans Frontières in 1977. Malhuret's humanitarian aid was beginning to be noticed, and in 1978 he became the President of France's overseas relief agency.

In 1980, Malhuret was one of the organizers of the "March for the Survival of Cambodia" in Thailand, with several media and artistic personalities, and read a speech written by Bernard-Henri Lévy.

== Political career ==
=== Career in government ===
From 1986 to 1988, Malhuret served as Secretary of State for Human Rights in the government of Prime Minister Jacques Chirac, the first in this position.

=== Member of the European Parliament, 1989–1993 ===
From 1989 to 1993, Malhuret was a Member of the European Parliament. In parliament, he served on the Committee on Political Affairs (1989–1990) and the Committee on Culture, Youth, Education and the Media (1992–1993). In addition to his committee assignments, he was part of the parliament's delegation for relations with Japan.

=== Mayor of Vichy, 1989–2017 ===
Malhuret was elected mayor of Vichy and President of the Vichy Urban District in 1989. He initiated a massive programme to modernize and restore the glory of the town, alongside other economic partners. This included the construction of a vast pedestrian area, upgrading of various hotels and renovation of the spas and Opera House.

Malhuret stepped down to vice-president of the Vichy Urban District in 2001, but remained the mayor of Vichy.

=== Member of the Senate, 2014–present ===
Malhuret first became a member of the French Senate in the 2014 elections.

In 2016, Malhuret publicly endorsed Alain Juppé in The Republicans' primaries for the 2017 presidential election.

Following the election of Emmanuel Macron as president, Malhuret left the Republicans and became one of the founding members of the new Agir party.

In 2021, when Agir began to move closer to Macron's Renaissance, he joined Horizons instead.

In 2023, Malhuret was the Senate's rapporteur on a proposal to ban video-sharing application TikTok.

=== 2025 speech ===
On 4 March 2025, Malhuret delivered an eight-minute speech to the French Senate about Donald Trump, Elon Musk, and NATO. Critical of the Trump administration, the speech received significant attention in social media and mainstream media around the world.

=== Other positions ===
Malhuret served as a member of the Board of Directors of French nursing home chain Korian from 2003 to 2014.
