= Claude Domeizel =

French politician (born 1940)

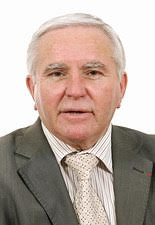
Claude Domeizel

Claude Domeizel (born 16 May 1940) is a French politician and a former member of the Senate of France. He represented the Alpes de Haute-Provence department from 1998 to 2014 as a member of the Socialist Party.

== Bibliography ==
- Page on the Senate website (in French)
