= Mireille Jouve =

French politician

- Born: 30 December 1960 (age 65)
- Occupation: Politician

Mireille Jouve (born 30 December 1960) is a French politician. She has served as a member of the French Senate since 28 September 2014. She is also the Mayor of Meyrargues.
