= Anne Ventalon =

French politician (born 1972)

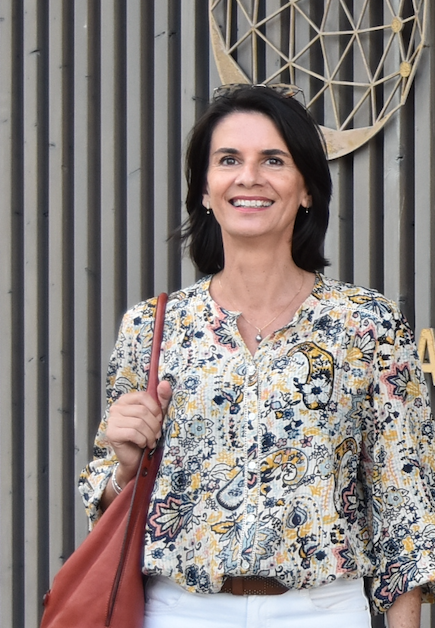
- Ventalon in 2022

Senator for Ardèche
- Incumbent
- Assumed office 1 October 2020
- Preceded by: Catherine André

Personal details
- Born: 1 July 1972 (age 54) Aubenas, France
- Party: Union for a Popular Movement (until 2015); The Republicans (since 2015)
- Occupation: Teacher

Anne Ventalon (French pronunciation: [an vɑ̃talɔ̃]; born 7 January 1972) is a French teacher and politician who has served as a Senator for Ardèche since 2020. In the 2020 Senate election, she won her seat in the first round with 51.7% of the vote, succeeding Catherine André, who declined to run for reelection to a full term. She sits with the Senate Republicans.

Ventalon has also been a municipal councillor of Vals-les-Bains since 2014 and was a departmental councillor of Ardèche for the canton of Aubenas-1 from 2015 until her resignation in 2020 following her election to the Senate.

== See also ==
- Departmental Council of Ardèche
