= Sylviane Noël =

French politician (born 1978)

Senator for Haute-Savoie
- Incumbent
- Assumed office 7 August 2018
- Preceded by: Jean-Claude Carle

Personal details
- Born: 27 January 1978 (age 48) Bonneville, France
- Party: The Republicans
- Profession: Parliamentary staffer

Sylviane Noël (French pronunciation: [silvjan nɔɛl]; born 27 January 1978) is a French politician. She has served as a member of the Senate of France since 2018, representing the Haute-Savoie department. Noël is the first woman to represent the department in the Senate. She is a member of The Republicans.

== Political career ==
In 2008, Noël won election as the mayor of the commune of Nancy-sur-Cluses. She was re-elected to the post in 2014.

In 2012, Noël was a deputy to Georges Morand, who ran for the National Assembly with the UMP. Noël and Morand were sanctioned by the UMP for running against the party's preferred candidate Sophie Dion. Senator Jean-Claude Carle placed her second on his list in the 2014 French Senate election; but the list took just under 30 percent of the vote, not enough to win a second seat for the list.

Senator Carle resigned his seat in June 2018 and announced that he would hand over the seat to Noël, who became the first woman Senator from Haute-Savoie.

== Political positions ==
Ahead of the 2021 primary for the 2022 presidential election, Noël publicly declared her support for Michel Barnier as The Republicans' candidate.
