= Alain Duffourg =

French politician (born 1950)

Alain Duffourg (born 22 January 1950) is a French politician. He has served as a member of the Senate of France since 2020, representing the Gers department. He is a member of the Centrist Union group.
