= Kristina Pluchet =

French politician (born 1973)

Member of the Senate
- Incumbent
- Assumed office 1 October 2020
- Constituency: Eure

Personal details
- Born: 1 May 1973 (age 52)
- Party: The Republicans

Kristina Pluchet (born 1 May 1973) is a French politician serving as a member of the Senate since 2020. In 2020, she served as mayor of Saussay-la-Campagne.
