= Ludovic Haye =

French politician (born 1975)

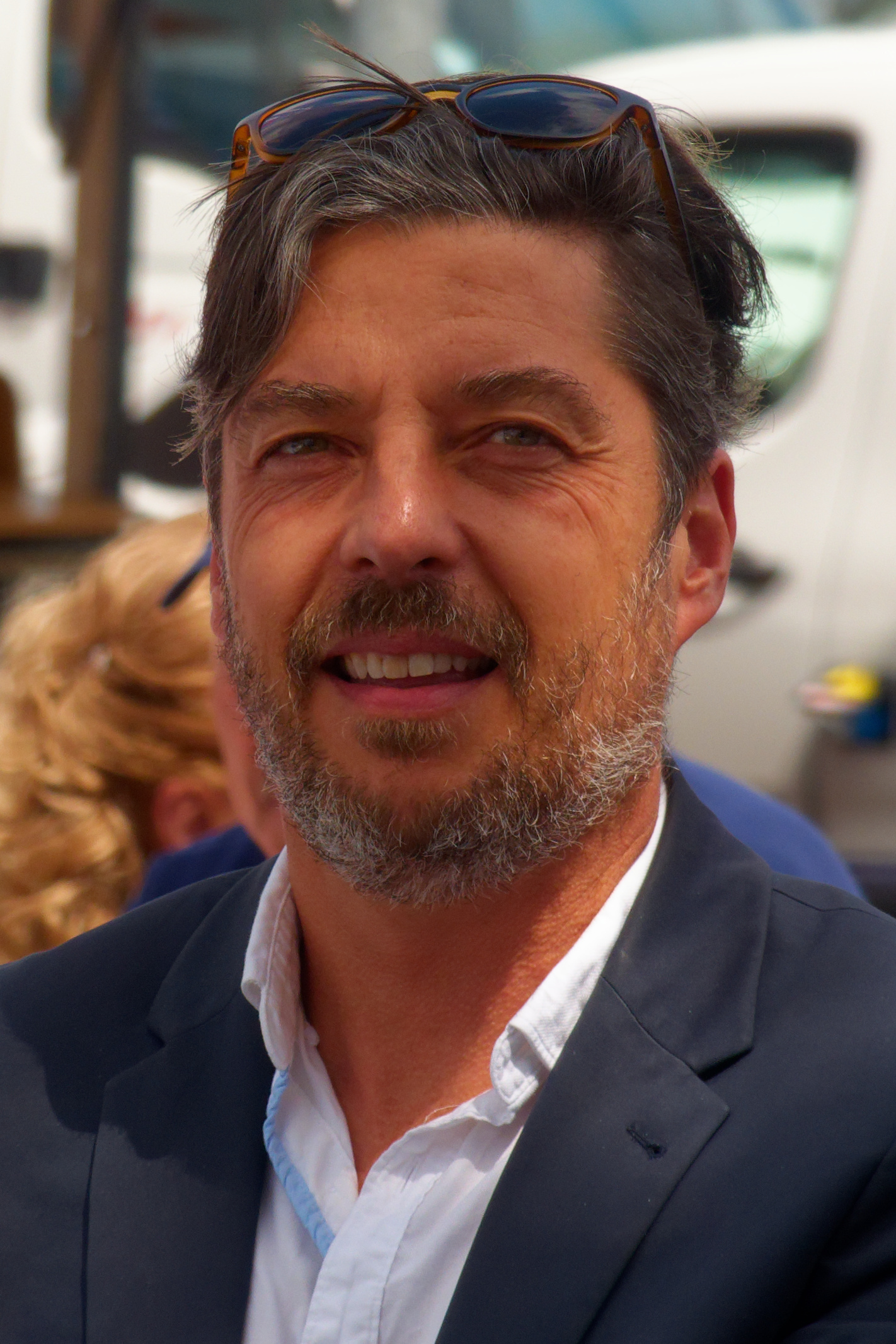
- Haye in 2023

Member of the Senate
- Incumbent
- Assumed office 1 October 2020
- Constituency: Haut-Rhin

Personal details
- Born: 18 January 1975 (age 51)
- Party: Horizons

Ludovic Haye (born 18 January 1975) is a French politician serving as a member of the Senate since 2020. From 2017 to 2020, he served as mayor of Rixheim.
