= Évelyne Perrot =

French politician (born 1951)

Évelyne Perrot (French: [evlin pɛʁo]; born June 22, 1951) is a French politician. She has served as a member of the Senate of France since 2017, representing the Aube department. She is a member of the Centrist Union group.
