= Fabien Genet =

French politician (born 1975)

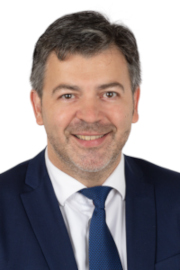
- Genet in 2020

Member of the Senate
- Incumbent
- Assumed office 1 October 2020
- Constituency: Saône-et-Loire

Personal details
- Born: 22 March 1975 (age 51)
- Party: The Republicans

Fabien Genet (born 22 March 1975) is a French politician serving as a member of the Senate since 2020. From 2014 to 2020, he served as mayor of Digoin.
