= Fabien Bravi =

French politician (born 1984)

Member of the Senate
- Incumbent
- Assumed office 1 October 2026
- Constituency: Bouches-du-Rhône

Personal details
- Born: 26 October 1984 (age 41)
- Party: National Rally (since 2025)

Fabien Bravi (born 26 October 1984) is a French politician who was elected member of the Senate in 2026. He has been a municipal councillor of Vitrolles and a metropolitan councillor of the Aix-Marseille-Provence Metropolis since 2026.
