= Sébastien Pla =

French politician (born 1977)

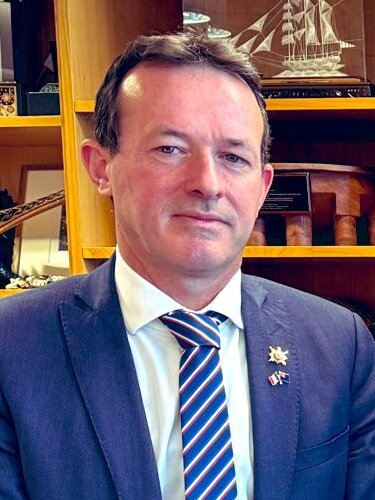
- Pla in 2025

Member of the Senate
- Incumbent
- Assumed office 1 October 2020
- Constituency: Aude

Personal details
- Born: 18 July 1977 (age 48)
- Party: Socialist Party

Sébastien Pla (born 18 July 1977) is a French politician serving as a member of the Senate since 2020. From 2001 to 2020, he served as mayor of Duilhac-sous-Peyrepertuse.
