= The Independents – Republic and Territories group =

Parliamentary group in the French Senate

The Independents – Republic and Territories Les Indépendants – République et Territoires
- Chamber: Senate
- Foundation: 3 October 2017
- Previous name(s): Republic and Territories / The Independents group (2017); Groupe République et Territoires / Les Indépendants
- Member parties: Horizons; Radical Party; Miscellaneous right LR
- President: Claude Malhuret
- Representation: 15 / 348
- Ideology: Liberalism; Social liberalism French republicanism Pro-Europeanism
- Political position: Centre-right
- Website: www.independants-senat.fr

The Independents – Republic and Territories (French: Les Indépendants – République et Territoires, LIRT) is a centre-right parliamentary group in the French Senate established in 2017. It consist of senators from the Horizons party, the Radical Party and the Miscellaneous right. Its president is Claude Malhuret.

== History ==
According to an article in L'Opinion on 20 August 2017, Prime Minister Édouard Philippe had a meeting with three senators of The Republicans (LR) on 3 August: Fabienne Keller, Jérôme Bignon, and Claude Malhuret, all of whom had supported Alain Juppé during the 2016 primary. Starting in mid-May, a group of a dozen LR senators began to meet regularly to discuss the future of "constructives" in the Senate, and continued after the formation of such a group in the National Assembly. Discussions were also held with the centrist group in the Senate. However, the consensus ultimately tilted towards the creation of a new group in the Senate, to be founded in mid-September, so as to not disrupt the campaign for the 2017 renewal but be prepared to form a group after the elections on 24 September. Keller confirmed the initiative to Le Monde in early September, claiming that about twenty senators close to Juppé and Le Maire were interested in the initiative, enough to form a parliamentary group, and also floated the possibility of other centrist senators joining the presumptive group. The senators described themselves as "humanists, liberals, Europeans, Girondins and open to the questions of society", distant from the conservatives in The Republicans represented by the Fillonist president of the LR group Bruno Retailleau, who hoped to lead the opposition to the policies of Emmanuel Macron in the Senate.

On 14 September, ten LR senators submitted to the Paris Police Prefecture the declaration of the association attached to a future group, and made clear that the members of the group would vote to re-elect LR senator Gérard Larcher as president of the Senate. On 2 October, Claude Malhuret officially announced that he would preside over the newly created Republic and Territories / The Independents group (groupe République et Territoires / Les Indépendants) consisting of 11 senators hoping to defend the centre-right "liberal, European and social" line, with the group officially constituted on 3 October.

On 24 October, Malhuret submitted a request to rename it to The Independents – Republic and Territories group (groupe Les Indépendants – République et Territoires), which was accepted during the session the following day.

As a consequence, all the rebellious LR senators left The Republicans and created Agir, which originally was one of the parties in the group, but most switched to Horizons in 2021-22, when Agir began to move closer to and eventually merged with Macron's Renaissance.

== List of presidents ==
Name	Image	Term start	Term end	Notes
Claude Malhuret		3 October 2017	present	

== Historical membership ==
Year	Leader	Seats	Change	Series	Notes
2017	Claude Malhuret	11 / 348	Steady	1	
2020	Claude Malhuret	13 / 348	▲2	2	

== See also ==
- The Constructives: Republicans, UDI, and Independents group
