= List of senators of France by department =

A list of senators of France by the department that they have represented:

== Metropolitan France ==
- Ain
- Aisne
- Allier
- Alpes-de-Haute-Provence
- Alpes-Maritimes
- Ardèche
- Ardennes
- Ariège
- Aube
- Aude
- Aveyron
- Bas-Rhin
- Bouches-du-Rhône
- Calvados
- Cantal
- Charente
- Charente-Maritime
- Cher
- Corrèze
- Corse-du-Sud
- Côte-d'Or
- Côtes-d'Armor
- Creuse
- Deux-Sèvres
- Dordogne
- Doubs
- Drôme
- Essonne
- Eure
- Eure-et-Loir
- Finistère
- Gard
- Gers
- Gironde
- Hautes-Alpes
- Haute-Corse
- Haute-Garonne
- Haute-Loire
- Haute-Marne
- Hautes-Pyrénées
- Haut-Rhin
- Haute-Saône
- Haute-Savoie
- Hauts-de-Seine
- Haute-Vienne
- Hérault
- Ille-et-Vilaine
- Indre
- Indre-et-Loire
- Isère
- Jura
- Landes
- Loir-et-Cher
- Loire
- Loire-Atlantique
- Loiret
- Lot
- Lot-et-Garonne
- Lozère
- Maine-et-Loire
- Manche
- Marne
- Mayenne
- Meurthe-et-Moselle
- Meuse
- Morbihan
- Moselle
- Nièvre
- Nord
- Oise
- Orne
- Paris
- Pas-de-Calais
- Puy-de-Dôme
- Pyrénées-Atlantiques
- Pyrénées-Orientales
- Rhône
- Saône-et-Loire
- Sarthe
- Savoie
- Seine-Maritime
- Seine-et-Marne
- Seine-Saint-Denis
- Somme
- Tarn
- Tarn-et-Garonne
- Territoire de Belfort
- Val-de-Marne
- Val-d'Oise
- Var
- Vaucluse
- Vendée
- Vienne
- Vosges
- Yonne
- Yvelines

== Overseas departments ==
- French citizens living abroad
- French Guiana
- French Polynesia
- Guadeloupe
- Martinique
- Mayotte
- New Caledonia
- Réunion
- Saint Barthélemy
- Saint Martin
- Saint Pierre and Miquelon
- Wallis and Futuna

== Former French departments ==
- French West Africa
- French East Africa
- French Equatorial Africa
- French Algeria
- French India
- Corsica
- Seine
- Seine-et-Oise
