= List of senators of Loire =

Location of Loire in France

Following is a list of senators of Loire, people who have represented the department of Loire in the Senate of France.

== Third Republic ==
Senators for Loire under the French Third Republic were:

- Lucien Arbel (1876–1888)
- Pierre de Montgolfier-Verpilleux (1876–1879)
- Camille de Meaux (1876–1879)
- Jean-Baptiste Chavassieu (1879–1888)
- Charles Cherpin (1879–1884)
- Étienne Brossard (1885–1894)
- Pierre Madignier (1887–1894)
- Barthélémy Brunon (1888–1896)
- Francisque Reymond (1888–1905)
- Albert Marchais de la Berge (1891–1894)
- Jean-Honoré Audiffred (1894–1895 et de 1904–1917)
- Pierre Waldeck-Rousseau (1894–1904)
- Philippe Blanc (1895–1906)
- Pierre Bourganel (1895–1920)
- Émile Crozet-Fourneyron (1897–1906)
- Émile Reymond (1905–1914)
- André Chollet (1906–1911)
- Gabriel Réal (1906–1919)
- Jean-Baptiste Morel (1912–1927)
- Louis Maurin (1920–1924)
- Fernand Merlin (1920–1937)
- Louis Soulié (1920–1933)
- Antoine Drivet (1920–1940)
- François Delay (1924–1933)
- Pierre Robert (1927–1940)
- Jean Neyret (1933–1940)
- Jean Taurines (1933–1940)
- Antoine Pinay (1938–1940)

== Fourth Republic ==
Senators for Loire under the French Fourth Republic were:

- Jules Boyer (1946–1948)
- Barthélémy Ott (1946–1948)
- Claudius Buard (1946–1948)
- Max Fléchet (1948–1959)
- Alexandre de Fraissinette (1948–1955)
- Aimé Malécot (1948–1955)
- Louis Metton (1955–1959)
- Claude Mont (1955–1959)

== Fifth Republic ==
Senators for Loire under the French Fifth Republic:

In office	Name	Group	Notes
1959–1962	André Chazalon	Groupe des Républicains Populaires	Resigned 13 December 1962 (elected deputy)
1959–1992	Claude Mont	Groupe Union Centriste	
1959–1983	Louis Martin	Groupe de l'Union des Républicains et des Indépendants	
1959–1974	Henri Desseigne	Groupe Union Centriste	
1963–1965	Max Fléchet	Groupe des Républicains et Indépendants	
1965–1967	Michel Durafour	Groupe de la Gauche Démocratique	Resigned 3 April 1967 (elected deputy)
1967–1974	Jean-Pierre Blanchet	none	
1974–1983	François Dubanchet	Groupe de l'Union Centriste des Démocrates de Progrès	
1974–1983	Paul Pillet	Groupe de l'Union Centriste des Démocrates de Progrès	
1983–1988	Michel Durafour	Groupe de la Gauche Démocratique	Resigned 12 June 1988
1983–2001	Louis Mercier	Groupe Union Centriste	
1983–2001	Lucien Neuwirth	Groupe du Rassemblement pour la République	
1988–1997	François Mathieu	Groupe Union Centriste	Elected 4 September 1988; Died in office 17 November 1997
1992–2001	Guy Poirieux	Groupe des Républicains et Indépendants	
1997–present	Bernard Fournier	Groupe Les Républicains	Replaced François Mathieu on 19 November 1997
2001–2011	Josiane Mathon-Poinat	Groupe Communiste, Républicain, Citoyen et des Sénateurs du Parti de Gauche	
2001–2016	Jean-Claude Frécon	Groupe socialiste et républicain	Died 10 December 2016
2001–2010	Michel Thiollière	Groupe Union pour un Mouvement Populaire	Mandate terminated 16 April 2010
2010–2011	Christiane Longère	Groupe Union pour un Mouvement Populaire	Replaced Michel Thiollière on 17 April 2010
2011–2017	Maurice Vincent	Groupe La République En Marche	
2011–present	Cécile Cukierman	Groupe communiste républicain citoyen et écologiste	
2016–2017	Évelyne Rivollier	Groupe communiste républicain et citoyen	Replaced Jean-Claude Frécon on 11 December 2016
2017–present	Jean-Claude Tissot	Groupe socialiste et républicain	
2017–present	Bernard Bonne	Groupe Les Républicains	

== Sources ==
- Liste des anciens sénateurs de la IIIème République par circonscription (in French), Sénat de France
- Liste des anciens sénateurs de la IVème République par circonscription (in French), Sénat de France
- Liste des anciens sénateurs de la Vème République par circonscription (in French), Sénat de France
- Liste par département - Loire (in French), Sénat de France
