= List of senators of Cher =

Location of Cher in France

Following is a list of senators of Cher, people who have represented the department of Cher in the Senate of France.

== Third Republic ==
Senators for Cher under the French Third Republic were:

- Henri Fournier (1876–1885)
- Louis Rivière (1876–1885)
- Jean Girault (1885–1909) Died in office
- Valentin Peaudecerf (1885–1903)
- Louis Pauliat (1887–1915) Died in office
- Charles Daumy (1903–1910) Died in office
- Antony Martinet (1909–1921)
- Émile Bonnelat (1910–1921)
- Hippolyte Mauger (1920–1939)
- Christophe Pajot (1921–1929) Died in office
- Jules-Louis Breton (1921–1939)
- Marcel Plaisant (1929–1945)
- Henri Laudier (1930–1943) Died in office
- André Breton (1939–1945)

== Fourth Republic ==
Senators for Cher under the French Fourth Republic were:

- René Cherrier (1946–1948)
- Gustave Sarrien (1946–1952) Died in office
- Marcel Plaisant (1948–1958) Died in office
- Charles Durand (1952–1959)

== Fifth Republic ==
Senators for Cher under the French Fifth Republic:

In office	Name	Group	Notes
1959–1983	Charles Durand	Groupe de l'Union Centriste des Démocrates de Progrès	Died in office 28 March 1983
1959–1970	Eugène Jamain	Groupe du Centre Républicain d'Action Rurale et Sociale	Died in office 24 October 1970
1970–1971	Yves Villard	Groupe du Centre Républicain d'Action Rurale et Sociale	Replaced Eugène Jamain on 25 October 1970
1971–1998	Jacques Genton	Groupe Union Centriste	
1983–1989	Pierre Sicard	Groupe Union Centriste	Replaced Charles Durand on 29 March 1983
1989–2007	Serge Vinçon	Groupe Union pour un Mouvement Populaire	Died in office 16 December 2007
1998–2004	Serge Lepeltier	Groupe Union pour un Mouvement Populaire	Resigned 30 April 2004 (Joined cabinet)
2004–2005	Georges Ginoux	Groupe Union pour un Mouvement Populaire	Replaced Serge Lepeltier 1 May 2004; Resigned 30 June 2005
2005–present	Rémy Pointereau	Groupe Les Républicains	Elected 18 September 2005
2007–present	François Pillet	Groupe Les Républicains	Replaced Serge Vinçon on 17 December 2007

== Sources ==
- Liste des anciens sénateurs de la IIIème République par circonscription (in French), Sénat de France
- Liste des anciens sénateurs de la IVème République par circonscription (in French), Sénat de France
- Liste des anciens sénateurs de la Vème République par circonscription (in French), Sénat de France
- Liste par département - Cher (in French), Sénat de France
