= List of senators of French East Africa =

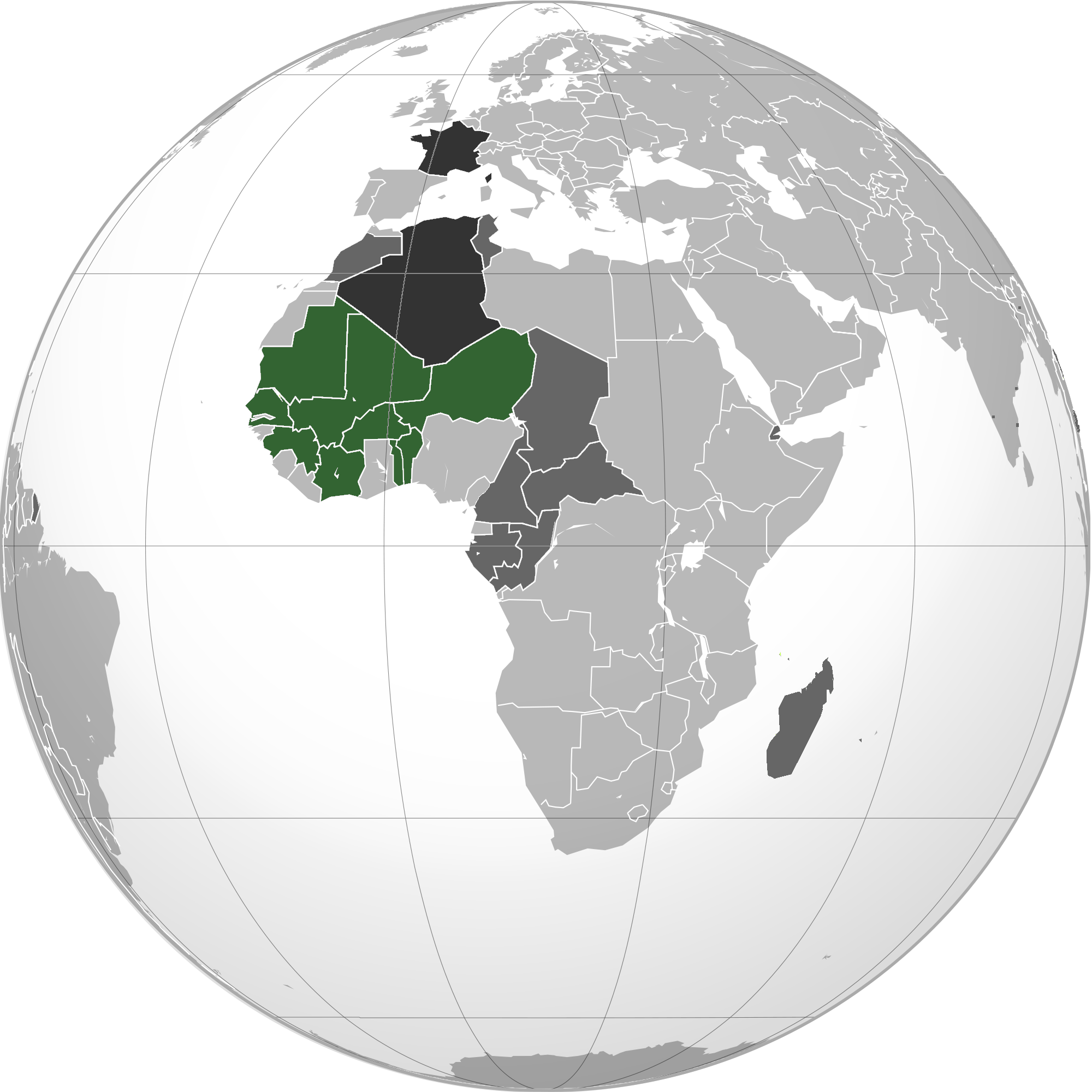
French African colonies after World War II

Following is a list of senators of French East Africa, people who have represented the French colonies in East Africa and the Indian Ocean in the Senate of France since the end of World War II (1939–45). Many countries have since declared independence and are thus no longer included in the French Senate.

== Comoros ==
Location of the Comoros

Senators for the Comoros were:

In office	Name	Group	Notes
1947–1959	Jacques Grimaldi	Gauche Démocratique et Rassemblement des Gauches Républicaines	
1959–1973	Ahmed Abdallah	Not aligned	Resigned 9 January 1973
1973–1975	Said Mohamed Jaffar	Not aligned	Resigned 6 November 1975

The Comoros declared independent on 6 July 1975, but the island of Mayotte chose to remain with France. See List of senators of Mayotte for senators for that island.

== Madagascar ==
Location of Madagascar

The Malagasy Republic was proclaimed on 14 October 1958 as an autonomous state within the French Community, and declared full independence two years later. Senators for French Madagascar before then under the French Fourth Republic were:

In office	Name	Group	Notes
1947–1948	Justin Bezara	Not aligned	
1947–1948	André Peyroulx-Romain	Républicains Indépendants	
1947–1948	Ramamonjy Raherivelo	Not aligned	
1947–1948	Jules Ranaivo	Not aligned	
1948–1951	Félix Totolehibe	Républicains Indépendants	Died in office 2 February 1951
1947–1952	Daniel Serrure	Républicains Indépendants	
1948–1952	André Liotard	Républicains Indépendants	Known As Alcide Liotard
1948–1952	Michel Randria	Républicains Indépendants	
1948–1959	Norbert Zafimahova	Indépendants d'Outre-Mer	
1952–1959	Jules Castellani	Rassemblement d'Outre-Mer	
1952–1958	Ralijaona Laingo	Républicains Sociaux	
1952–1958	Pierre Ramampy	Gauche Démocratique et Rassemblement des Gauches Républicaines	
1952–1959	Paul Longuet	Gauche Démocratique et Rassemblement des Gauches Républicaines	
1958–1959	Laurent Botokeky	Socialiste	
1958–1959	Eugène Bernard Lechat	Socialiste	
1958–1959	Stanislas Rakotonirina	Socialiste	

== Somaliland ==
Location of French Somaliland

French Somaliland, officially Côte française des Somalis, became the Territoire des Afar et des Issas on 19 March 1967. From 1977 it has been the Republic of Djibouti. Senators for French Somaliland under the French Fourth Republic and French Fifth Republic were:

In office	Name	Group	Notes
1946–1952	Djama Ali Moussa	Union Républicaine et Résistante pour l'Union Française	
1952–1958	Hassan Gouled Aptidon	Rassemblement d'Outre-Mer	
1958–1959	Ahmed Goumane-Roble	Gauche Démocratique et du Rassemblement des Gauches Républicaines	
1959–1965	Mohamed Kamil	Groupe de l'Union pour la Nouvelle République	
1965–1980	Barkat Gourad Hamadou	Union pour la Nouvelle République	Resigned 30 June 1980; Prime Minister from 1978 to 2001

== Sources ==
- Liste des anciens sénateurs de la IVème République par circonscription: Comores (in French), Sénat de France
- Liste des anciens sénateurs de la IVème République par circonscription: Madagascar (in French), Sénat de France
- Liste des anciens sénateurs de la IVème République par circonscription: Côte française des Somalis (in French), Sénat de France
- Liste des anciens sénateurs de la Vème République par circonscription: Comores (in French), Sénat de France
- Liste des anciens sénateurs de la Vème République par circonscription: Côte française des Somalis (in French), Sénat de France
