= List of senators of Eure-et-Loir =

Location of Eure-et-Loir in France

Following is a list of senators of Eure-et-Loir, people who have represented the department of Eure-et-Loir in the Senate of France.

== Third Republic ==
Senators for Eure-et-Loir under the French Third Republic were:

- Jacques Delacroix (1876–1885)
- Émile Labiche (1876–1921)
- Ferdinand Jumeau (1885)
- Pierre Dreux (1885–1888)
- Louis Vinet (1888–1921)
- Georges Fessard (1905–1912)
- Louis Baudet (1912–1918)
- Albert Royneau (1920–1921)
- Gustave Lhopiteau (1912–1930)
- Paul Deschanel (1921–1922)
- Henri Villette–Gaté (1922–1928)
- Jean Valadier (1928–1944)
- Albert Royneau (1921–1922)
- Paul Bouvart (1922–1933)
- Maurice Viollette (1930–1939)
- Jacques Benoist (1933–1939)
- Jacques Gautron (1939–1944)
- Raymond Gilbert (1939–1944)

== Fourth Republic ==
Senators for Eure-et-Loir under the French Fourth Republic were:

- Charles Brune (1946–1956) – died in office
- François Levacher (1956–1959)
- Robert Brizard (1946–1959)

== Fifth Republic ==
Senators for Eure-et-Loir under the French Fifth Republic:

Period	Name	Group	Notes
1959–1962	Guy de La Vasselais	none	
1959–1962	François Levacher	Centre Républicain d'Action Rurale et Sociale	
1962–1971	Guy de La Vasselais	none	
1962–1971	François Levacher	Centre Républicain d'Action Rurale et Sociale	
1971–1980	Émile Vivier	Groupe socialiste	
1971–1980	Jean Cauchon	Union Centriste	
1980–1989	Jean Cauchon	Union Centriste	
1980–1989	Raymond Poirier	Union Centriste	
1989–1998	Jean Grandon	none	
1989–1998	Martial Taugourdeau	Rassemblement pour la République	
1998–2008	Martial Taugourdeau	Rassemblement pour la République	Died in office 14 October 2001
1998–2008	Joël Billard	Union pour un Mouvement Populaire	Replaced Martial Taugourdeau 15 October 2001
1998–2008	Gérard Cornu	Les Républicains	
2008–2014	Gérard Cornu	Les Républicains	
2008–2014	Joël Billard	Union pour un Mouvement Populaire	
2008–2014	Albéric de Montgolfier	Les Républicains	
2014–2020	Gérard Cornu	Les Républicains	
2014–2020	Albéric de Montgolfier	Les Républicains	
2014–2020	Chantal Deseyne	Les Républicains	

== Sources ==
- Liste des anciens sénateurs de la IIIème République par circonscription (in French), Sénat de France
- Liste des anciens sénateurs de la IVème République par circonscription (in French), Sénat de France
- Liste des anciens sénateurs de la Vème République par circonscription (in French), Sénat de France
- Liste par département – Eure-et-Loir (in French), Sénat de France
