= Alfonsi =

Alfonsi is a surname. Notable people with the surname include:

- François Alfonsi (born 1953), French politician
- Lydia Alfonsi (1928–2022), Italian actress
- Nicolas Alfonsi (1936–2020), French politician
- Paul Alfonsi (1908–1989), American politician
- Sharyn Alfonsi (born 1972), American journalist
