= List of senators of Corse-du-Sud =

Location of Corse-du-Sud in France

Following is a list of senators of Corse-du-Sud, people who have represented the department of Corse-du-Sud in the Senate of France. The department was formed on 15 September 1975, when the department of Corsica was divided into Haute-Corse and Corse-du-Sud.

== Fifth Republic ==
Senators for Corse-du-Sud under the French Fifth Republic:

Period		Name	Party	Notes
1980	1994	Charles Ornano	not aligned	Died in office
1994	2001	Louis-Ferdinand de Rocca Serra	Independent Republicans Group (RI)	Dismissed
2001	2014	Nicolas Alfonsi	European Democratic and Social Rally group (RDSE)	
2014	Incumbent	Jean-Jacques Panunzi	Union for a Popular Movement (UMP)	

== Sources ==
- Liste des anciens sénateurs de la Vème République par circonscription (in French), Sénat de France
- Liste par département – Corse-du-Sud (in French), Sénat de France
