= List of senators of Haute-Savoie =

Location of Haute-Savoie in France

Following is a list of senators of Haute-Savoie, people who have represented the department of Haute-Savoie in the Senate of France.

== Third Republic ==
Senators for Haute-Savoie under the French Third Republic were:

- Alfred Chardon (1876-1893)
- Louis Chaumontel (1876-1892)
- César Duval (1898-1909)
- Félix Francoz (1892-1900)
- André Folliet (1893-1905)
- Félix Francoz (1900-1909)
- Émile Chautemps (1905-1918
- César Duval (1910-1925)
- Émile Goy (1910-1920)
- Jules Mercier (1910-1920)
- Fernand David (1920-1935)
- Claudius Gallet (1920-1936)
- Hippolyte Curral (1925-1936)
- Paul Jacquier (1935-1944)
- Joseph Blanc (1936-1941)
- Félix Braise (1936-1942)

== Fourth Republic ==
Senators for Haute-Savoie under the French Fourth Republic were:

- Charles Bosson (1946-1948)
- Amédée Guy (1946-1948)
- René Rosset (1946-1948)
- Jean Clerc (1948-1959)
- François Ruin (1948-1958)
- Arthur Lavy (1958-1959)

== Fifth Republic ==
Senators for Haute-Savoie under the French Fifth Republic:

Term	Name	Group or party	Notes
1959-1968	Arthur Lavy	Républicains et Indépendants	
1959-1968	Jean Clerc	Républicains Populaires	Died on 9 March 1966
1959-1968	Paul Favre	Républicains Populaires	From 10 March 1966 in place of Jean Clerc
1968-1977	Arthur Lavy	Républicains et Indépendants	
1968-1977	Charles Bosson	Union Centriste	
1977-1986	Charles Bosson	Union Centriste	
1977-1986	Raymond Bouvier	Union Centriste	
1977-1986	Bernard Pellarin	Rassemblement Démocratique et Européen	
1986-1995	Raymond Bouvier	Union Centriste	
1986-1995	Jacques Golliet	Union Centriste	
1986-1995	Bernard Pellarin	Rassemblement Démocratique et Européen	
1995-2004	Jean-Paul Amoudry	Groupe Union des Démocrates et Indépendants	
1995-2004	Jean-Claude Carle	Les Républicains	
1995-2004	Pierre Hérisson	Union pour un Mouvement Populaire	
2004-2014	Jean-Paul Amoudry	Groupe Union des Démocrates et Indépendants	
2004-2014	Jean-Claude Carle	Les Républicains	
2004-2014	Pierre Hérisson	Union pour un Mouvement Populaire	
2014–present	Loïc Hervé	Union Centriste	
2014–present	Jean-Claude Carle	Les Républicains	
2014–present	Cyril Pellevat	Les Républicains	

== Sources ==
- Liste des anciens sénateurs de la IIIème République par circonscription (in French), Sénat de France
- Liste des anciens sénateurs de la IVème République par circonscription (in French), Sénat de France
- Liste des anciens sénateurs de la Vème République par circonscription (in French), Sénat de France
- Liste par département – Haute-Savoie (in French), Sénat de France
