= List of senators of Pyrénées-Orientales =

Location of Pyrénées-Orientales in France

Following is a List of senators of Pyrénées-Orientales, people who have represented the department of Pyrénées-Orientales in the Senate of France.

== Third Republic ==
- Emmanuel Arago (1876–1896)
- Pierre Lefranc (1876–1877)
- Paul Massot (1877–1881)
- Achille Farines (1882)
- Lazare Escarguel (1882–1891)
- Édouard Vilar (1891–1927)
- Élie Delcros, de 1897–1904)
- Jules Pams (1904–1930)
- Victor Dalbiez (1927–1936)
- Pierre Rameil (1930–1936)
- Jean Payra (1936–1937)
- Georges Pézières (1936–1940)
- Joseph Parayre (1937–1940)

== Fourth Republic ==
- Gaston Cardonne (1946–1948)
- Joseph Gaspard (1948–1959)
- Léon-Jean Grégory (1948–1959)

== Fifth Republic ==
- Léon-Jean Grégory (1959–1982)
- Gaston Pams (1959–1981)
- Jacqueline Alduy (1982–1983)
- Sylvain Maillols (1981–1983)
- Paul Alduy (1983–1992)
- Guy Malé (1983–1987)
- André Daugnac (1987–1992)
- Paul Blanc (1992–2011)
- René Marquès (1992–2001)
- Jean-Paul Alduy (2001–2011)
- Christian Bourquin (2011–2014) (died)
- Hermeline Malherbe-Laurent (PS) (2014–2017) after the death of Christian Bourquin
- François Calvet (LR), from 2011
- Jean Sol (LR), from 2017
