= 2004 Centre regional election =

← 1998	21 March 2004 (first round); 28 March 2004 (second round)	2010 →
	First party	Second party	Third party
Leader	Michel Sapin	Serge Vinçon	Jean Verdon
Party	PS	UMP	FN
Seats won	48	20	9
Popular vote	517,990	362,399	173,437
Percentage	49.15%	34.39%	14.59%

A regional election took place in the former region of Centre (now Centre-Val de Loire) on 21 March and 28 March 2004, along with all other regions. Michel Sapin (PS) was re-elected President of the Council (from 1998 to 2000 and from 2004 to 2007).

== Results ==
Party	Presidential candidate	First round		Second round		Seats
Party	Presidential candidate	Votes	%	Votes	%	Seats
Socialist Party	Michel Sapin	378,235	38.15	517,990	49.15	48
Union for a Popular Movement	Serge Vinçon	205,265	20.71	362,399	34.39	20
National Front	Jean Verdon	173,651	17.52	173,437	16.46	9
Union for French Democracy–Cap21	Jacqueline Gourault	135,776	13.70			0
LCR–LO	Jean-Jacques Prodhomme	55,635	5.61			0
Hunting, Fishing, Nature, Tradition	François Caré	42,793	4.32			0
Total		991,355	100.00	1,053,826	100.00	77
Valid votes		991,355	94.29	1,053,826	94.79	
Invalid/blank votes		60,076	5.71	57,902	5.21	
Total votes		1,051,431	100.00	1,111,728	100.00	
Registered voters/turnout		1,706,521	61.61	1,706,704	65.14	
Source: Ministry of the Interior, Delwit
