= List of senators of French Equatorial Africa =

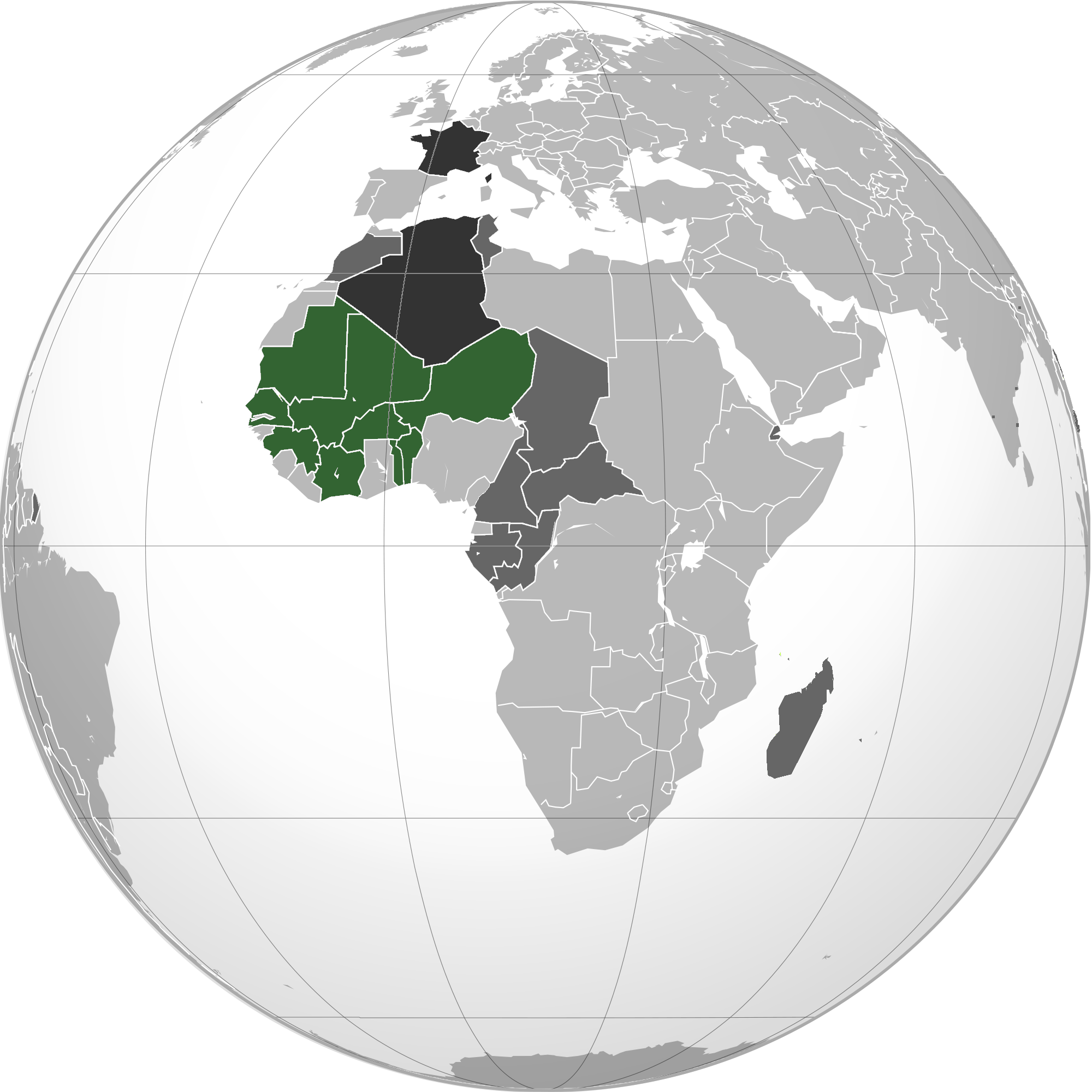
French African colonies after World War II

Following is a list of senators of French Africa, people who have represented the colonies in French Equatorial Africa during the French Fourth Republic. French Equatorial Africa was the federation of French colonial possessions in Equatorial Africa, extending northwards from the Congo River into the Sahel, and comprising what are today the countries of Chad, the Central African Republic, Cameroon, the Republic of the Congo, and Gabon.

== Cameroons ==
Location of Cameroon

Senators for the French Cameroons under the French Fourth Republic were:

In office	Name	Group	Notes
1947–1955	Charles Okala	Socialiste	
1947–1955	Jean Grassard	Gauche Démocratique et Rassemblement des Gauches Républicaines	
1947–1958	Arouna N'Joya	Socialiste	
1955–1957	Henri Chamaulte	Républicains Indépendants	Died in office 31 December 1957
1955–1958	Pierre Kotouo	Indépendants d'Outre-Mer	
1958	Pierre Ngayewang	Républicains Indépendants	

French Cameroun gained independence from France on 1 January 1960 and became the Republic of Cameroon.

== Chad ==
Location of Chad

Senators for Chad under the French Fourth Republic were:

In office	Name	Group	Notes
1947–1951	Mohamed Bechir-Sow	Action Démocratique et Républicaine	Until 6 November 1951 (elected deputy)
1947–1955	Julien Gautier	Rassemblement d'Outre-Mer	
1951–1959	Gontchomé Sahoulba	Rassemblement d'Outre-Mer	
1955–1959	William Tardrew	Républicains Sociaux	

Chad became an independent country on 11 August 1960.

== French Congo ==
Location of French Congo

Senators for the French Congo under the French Fourth Republic were:

In office	Name	Group	Notes
1947–1948	Raphaël Etifier	Communiste	
1947–1948	Maurice Gérard	Républicains Indépendants	
1948–1955	Jean Malonga	Socialiste	
1948–1956	Jean Coupigny	Rassemblement d'Outre-Mer	Until 6 November 1956 (resigned)
1955–1959	Pierre Goura	Union Démocratique et Socialiste de la Résistance / Rassemblement Démocratique Africain	
1957–1959	Jean Michelin	Rassemblement d'Outre-Mer	

The Republic of the Congo gained full independence from France on 15 August 1960.

== Gabon ==
Location of Gabon

Senators for Gabon under the French Fourth Republic were:

In office	Name	Group	Notes
1947–1959	Luc Durand-Reville	Gauche Démocratique / Rassemblement des Gauches Républicaines	
1947–1949	Mathurin Anghiley	Communiste	Died in office 1 June 1949
1949–1958	Paul Gondjout	Indépendants d'Outre-Mer	
1958–1959	Roland Bru	Union Démocratique et Socialiste de la Résistance / Rassemblement Démocratique Africain	

Gabon became an independent country on 17 August 1960.

== Ubangi-Shari ==
Location of Ubangi-Shari

Senators for Ubangi-Shari under the French Fourth Republic were:

In office	Name	Group	Notes
1947–1948	Arthur Guirriec	Gauche Démocratique / Rassemblement des Gauches Républicaines	
1947–1952	Jane Vialle	Gauche Démocratique / Rassemblement des Gauches Républicaines	
1948–1958	Robert Aubé	Rassemblement d'Outre-Mer	
1952–1959	Hector Rivierez	Républicains Indépendants	
1958–1959	Étienne N'Gounio	Socialiste	

Ubangi-Shari was renamed the Central African Republic (CAR) on 1 December 1958 and became fully independent on 13 August 1960.

== Sources ==
- Liste des anciens sénateurs de la IVème République par circonscription: Camerounlanguage=fr, Sénat de France
- Liste des anciens sénateurs de la IVème République par circonscription: Tchad (in French), Sénat de France
- Liste des anciens sénateurs de la IVème République par circonscription: Moyen-Congo (in French), Sénat de France
- Liste des anciens sénateurs de la IVème République par circonscription: Gabon (in French), Sénat de France
- Liste des anciens sénateurs de la IVème République par circonscription: Oubangui-Chari (in French), Sénat de France
