= List of senators of Indre-et-Loire =

Location of Indre-et-Loire in France

Following is a list of senators of Indre-et-Loire, people who have represented the department of Indre-et-Loire in the Senate of France.

== Third Republic ==
Senators for Indre-et-Loire under the French Third Republic were:

- Georges Houssard (1876–1879)
- Arthur de Quinemont (1876–1879)
- Hugues Fournier (1879–1888)
- Charles Guinot (1879–1893)
- Pierre Nioche (1888–1902)
- Antoine-Dieudonné Belle (1894–1915)
- Charles Bidault (1897–1917)
- Eugène Pic-Paris (1902–1917)
- Octave Foucher (1920–1933)
- Alphonse Chautemps (1920–1940)
- René Besnard (1920–1940)
- Paul Germain (1934–1940)

== Fourth Republic ==
Senators for Indre-et-Loire under the French Fourth Republic were:

- Henri Buffet (1946–1948)
- Paul Racault (1946–1948)
- Michel Debré (1948–1958)
- Joseph Leccia (1948–1955)
- Edmond Jollit (1955–1959)

== Fifth Republic ==
Senators for Indre-et-Loire under the French Fifth Republic:

- Marc Desaché (1959–1965)
- Jacques Vassor (1959–1974)
- Marcel Fortier (1965–1992)
- Raymond Villatte (1974–1975)
- Roger Moreau (1975–1983)
- André-Georges Voisin (1983–1992)
- Jean Delaneau (1983–2001)
- James Bordas (1992–2001)
- Dominique Leclerc (1992–2011)
- Yves Dauge (2001–2011)
- Marie-France Beaufils (2001–2017)
- Jean-Jacques Filleul (2011–2017)
- Jean Germain (2011–2015)
- Stéphanie Riocreux (2015–2017)
- Serge Babary from 2017
- Pierre Louault from 2017
- Isabelle Raimond-Pavero from 2017

== Sources ==
- Liste des anciens sénateurs de la IIIème République par circonscription (in French), Sénat de France
- Liste des anciens sénateurs de la IVème République par circonscription (in French), Sénat de France
- Liste des anciens sénateurs de la Vème République par circonscription (in French), Sénat de France
- Liste par département – Indre-et-Loire (in French), Sénat de France
