= List of senators of Nièvre =

Location of Nièvre in France

A List of senators of Nièvre, France, follows. These individuals have represented the Nièvre department of France in the French Senate.

== Third republic ==
Senators for Nièvre under the French Third Republic were:

Term	Senators
1876–1879	Charles (Bouillé) (1876–79); Antonin Viel de Lunas d'Espeuilles (1876–79)
1879–1888	Jean Massé (1879–88); Théodore Tenaille-Saligny (1879–88)
1888–1897	Jean-Charles Decray (to 1889); Léonel de Laubespin (to 1896); Charles Régnault (Savigny) (1889–97); Sylvestre Hérisson (1896–1900)
1897–1920	Félix Ducoudray (1897–1898}; Charles Le Peletier d'Aunay (1898–1918}; François Beaupin (1900–1916); Victor Petitjean (1900–1920); Jean Imbart de la Tour (1920)
1920–1924	Émile Chomet (1920–1924); Alfred Massé (1920–1924); Gaston Provost-Dumarchais (1921–1940)
1924–1933	François Gay (1924–1933); Émile Magnien (1924–1933)
1933–1940	Marcel Lebœuf (1933–1941); Achille Naudin (1933–1940)

== Fourth republic ==
Senators for Nièvre under the French Fourth Republic were:

- Jacques Gadoin (1946–1959) Miscellaneous left (DVG)
- Jean Doussot (1948–1959 Rally of the French People (RPF)

== Fifth republic ==
Senators for Nièvre under the French Fifth Republic:

Term	Senators
1959–1965	François Mitterrand (UDSR), elected deputy on 3 April 1962, after by-election in 1963 replaced by Daniel Benoîst (DVG); Jacques Gadoin (DVG)
1965–1974	Daniel Benoîst (SFIO), elected deputy on 3 April 1967, after by-election replaced by Jean Lhospied (DVG); Pierre Barbier (DVG)
1974–1983	Pierre Petit (PS), died 21 December 1977, replaced by his substitute Robert Guillaume (DVG); Fernand Dussert (PS), died 29 December 1975, replaced by his substitute Noël Berrier (PS).
1983–1992	Robert Guillaume (PS); Noël Berrier (PS), died 18 December 1986. replaced by his substitute René-Pierre Signé (PS)
1992–2001	Marcel Charmant (PS); René-Pierre Signé (PS)
2001–2011	Didier Boulaud (PS); René-Pierre Signé (PS)
2011–2017	Didier Boulaud (PS, 2011-2012), replaced by Anne Emery-Dumas (PS) in 2012 after his resignation; Gaëtan Gorce (PS)
2017–2023	Patrice Joly (PS); Nadia Sollogoub (DVD)

== Sources ==
- Liste des anciens sénateurs de la IIIème République par circonscription (in French), Sénat de France
- Liste des anciens sénateurs de la IVème République par circonscription (in French), Sénat de France
- Liste des anciens sénateurs de la Vème République par circonscription (in French), Sénat de France
- Liste par département – Somme (in French), Sénat de France
