= List of senators of Indre =

Location of Indre in France

Following is a list of senators of Indre, people who have represented the department of Indre in the Senate of France.

== Third Republic ==
Senators for Indre under the French Third Republic were:

- François-Marie Taillepied (Bondy) (1876–1890)
- Léon Clément (1876–1894)
- Paul-Antoine Bénazet (1891–1897)
- Arthur Brunet (1891–1900)
- Antony Ratier (1894–1933)
- Alfred Moroux (1897–1906)
- Émile Forichon, (1900–1915)
- Joseph Leglos (1906–1924)
- Henri Cosnier (1920–1932)
- Henry Dauthy (1924–1939)
- Paul Bénazet (1933–1940)
- Fernand Gautier (1933–1940)

== Fourth Republic ==
Senators for Indre under the French Fourth Republic were:

- Vincent Rotinat (1946–1959)
- Anatole Ferrant (1948–1955)
- René Caillaud (1955–1958)

== Fifth Republic ==
Senators for Indre under the French Fifth Republic:

In office	Name	Group	Notes
1959–1971	Roger Morève	Groupe de la Gauche Démocratique	
1959–1971	Vincent Rotinat	Groupe de la Gauche Démocratique	
1971–1982	René Touzet	Groupe de la Gauche Démocratique	Died in office 18 November 1982
1971–1989	Jean Bénard	Groupe de l'Union des Républicains et des Indépendants	
1982–1989	Guy Besse	Groupe du Rassemblement Démocratique et Européen	Replaced René Touzet on 19 November 1982
1989–2007	Daniel Bernardet	Groupe Union pour un Mouvement Populaire	Died in office 21 November 2007
1989–2008	François Gerbaud	Groupe Union pour un Mouvement Populaire	
2007–2016	Louis Pinton	Groupe Les Républicains	Replaced Daniel Bernardet on 22 November 2008; Died in office 17 November 2016
From 2008	Jean-François Mayet	Groupe Les Républicains	
From 2016	Frédérique Gerbaud	Groupe Les Républicains	Replaced Louis Pinton on 18 November 2016

== Sources ==
- Liste des anciens sénateurs de la IIIème République par circonscription (in French), Sénat de France
- Liste des anciens sénateurs de la IVème République par circonscription (in French), Sénat de France
- Liste des anciens sénateurs de la Vème République par circonscription (in French), Sénat de France
- Liste par département - Indre (in French), Sénat de France
