= Rémy Pointereau =

French politician

Member of the French Senate for Cher
- Incumbent
- Assumed office 18 September 2005
- Preceded by: Georges Ginoux

Personal details
- Born: 30 March 1953 (age 73) Loigny-la-Bataille, France
- Party: Union for a Popular Movement; The Republicans (2015–present)

Rémy Pointereau (born 30 March 1953) is a member of the Senate of France, representing the Cher department. He is currently a member of The Republicans, having been a member of its predecessor party, The Union for a Popular Movement.

== Career ==
In 2004, Pointereau served as president of the Cher departmental council. He was first elected as senator for Cher on 18 September 2005, following the resignation of Georges Ginoux. He also served as mayor of Lazenay.
