= List of senators of Vienne =

Location of Vienne in France

Following is a list of senators of Vienne, people who have represented the department of Vienne in the Senate of France.

== Third Republic ==
Senators for Vienne under the French Third Republic were:

- Louis Olivier Bourbeau (1876–1877)
- Paul de Ladmirault (1876–1891)
- Eugène Arnaudeau (1877–1891)
- Louis de Beauchamp (1885–1891)
- Henri Salomon (1891–1900)
- Aristide Couteaux (1891–1906)
- Léopold Thézard (1891–1907)
- Célestin Contancin en 1900)
- Maurice Demarçay (1900–1907)
- Guillaume Poulle (1906–1927)
- Jacques Servant (1907–1920)
- Victor Surreaux (1907–1920)
- François Albert (1920–1927)
- Raymond Duplantier (1920–1936)
- Raoul Péret (1927–1936)
- Victor Boret (1927–1940)
- Adrien André (1936–1940)
- Georges Maurice (1936–1940)

== Fourth Republic ==
Senators for Vienne under the French Fourth Republic were:

- Alphonse Bouloux (1946–1948)
- René Tognard (1946–1948)
- Georges Maurice (1948–1958)
- Jacques Masteau (1948–1959)
- Jean-Marie Bouloux (1958–1959)

== Fifth Republic ==
Senators for Vienne under the French Fifth Republic:

| In office | Name | Group | Notes |
|---|---|---|---|
| 1959–1968 | Jean-Marie Bouloux | Groupe Union Centriste | |
| 1959–1968 | Jacques Masteau | Groupe de la Gauche Démocratique | |
| 1968–1977 | Jean-Marie Bouloux | Groupe Union Centriste | |
| 1968–1977 | René Monory | Groupe Union pour un Mouvement Populaire | Joined cabinet April 1977 |
| 1968–1977 | Guy Robert | Groupe Union Centriste | Replaced René Monory in May 1977 |
| 1977–1986 | Jean-Marie Bouloux | Groupe Union Centriste | |
| 1977–1986 | René Monory | Groupe Union pour un Mouvement Populaire | Joined cabinet November 1977 |
| 1977–1986 | Guy Robert | Groupe Union Centriste | Replaced René Monory in November 1977. Resigned May 1981 |
| 1977–1986 | René Monory | Groupe Union pour un Mouvement Populaire | Reelected September 1981; Joined cabinet April 1986 |
| 1977–1986 | Guy Robert | Groupe Union Centriste | Replaced René Monory in April 1986 |
| 1986–1995 | Guy Robert | Groupe Union Centriste | |
| 1986–1995 | René Monory | Groupe Union pour un Mouvement Populaire | Joined cabinet November 1986 |
| 1986–1995 | Jacques Grandon | Groupe Union Centriste | Replaced René Monory November 1986; Resigned July 1988 |
| 1986–1995 | René Monory | Groupe Union pour un Mouvement Populaire | Reelected September 1988 |
| 1995–2004 | René Monory | Groupe Union pour un Mouvement Populaire | |
| 1995–2004 | Jean-Pierre Raffarin | Groupe Les Républicains | Joined cabinet October 1995 |
| 1995–2004 | Guy Robert | Groupe Union Centriste | Replaced Jean-Pierre Raffarin in November 1995; Resigned June 1997 |
| 1995–2004 | Jean-Pierre Raffarin | Groupe Les Républicains | Reelected September 1997; Became prime minister June 2002 |
| 1995–2004 | Alain Fouché | Les Indépendants - République et Territoires | Replaced Jean-Pierre Raffarin in June 2002 |
| 2004–2014 | Alain Fouché | Les Indépendants - République et Territoires | Elected September 2004 |
| 2004–2014 | Jean-Pierre Raffarin | Groupe Les Républicains | Became prime minister November 2004 |
| 2004–2014 | Claude Bertaud | Groupe Union pour un Mouvement Populaire | Replaced Jean-Pierre Raffarin November 2004; Resigned June 2005 |
| 2004–2014 | Jean-Pierre Raffarin | Groupe Les Républicains | Reelected September 2005 |
| from 2014 | Jean-Pierre Raffarin | Groupe Les Républicains | Elected September 2014; Resigned October 2017 |
| from 2014 | Yves Bouloux | Les Républicains (LR) | Elected December 2017 |
| from 2014 | Alain Fouché | Les Républicains (|LR) | Elected September 2014 |

== Sources ==
- Liste des anciens sénateurs de la IIIème République par circonscription (in French), Sénat de France
- Liste des anciens sénateurs de la IVème République par circonscription (in French), Sénat de France
- Liste des anciens sénateurs de la Vème République par circonscription (in French), Sénat de France
- Liste par département - Vienne (in French), Sénat de France
