= List of senators of Jura =

Location of Jura in France

Following is a list of senators of Jura, people who have represented the department of Jura in the Senate of France.

== Third Republic ==
Senators for Jura under the French Third Republic were:

- François Tamisier (1876–18809)
- Jules Thurel (1876–1897)
- Paul Grévy (1880–1906)
- Adolphe Lelièvre (1888–1897)(1897–1906)
- Jean-Baptiste Bourgeois du Jura (1897)
- Jean-Baptiste Vuillod (1897–1906)
- Stephen Pichon (1906–1924)
- Antoine Mollard (1906–1920)
- Georges Trouillot (1906–1920)
- Victor Bérard (1920–1932)
- Maximin Brocard (1920–1933)
- Marius Pieyre (1932–1935)
- Charles Dumont (1924–1939)
- Adrien Berthod (1935–1940)
- Charles Cencelme (1933–1937)
- Henri Léculier (1937–1940)
- Adolphe Pointaire (1939–1940)

== Fourth Republic ==
Senators for Jura under the French Fourth Republic were:

- Charles Laurent-Thouverey, Gauche démocratique, (1946–1958)
- Paul Giauque, Popular Republican Movement, (1946–1955)
- Paul Seguin, Radical-socialiste, (1955–1958)

== Fifth Republic ==
Senators for Jura under the French Fifth Republic:

Term	Name	Group	Notes
1959–1965	Charles Laurent-Thouverey	Gauche Démocratique	
1959–1965	Edgar Faure	Gauche Démocratique	
1965–1974	Charles Laurent-Thouverey	Gauche Démocratique	
1965–1974	Edgar Faure	Gauche Démocratique	Resigned 8 February 1966 (named to cabinet)
1965–1974	Jean Gravier	Union Centriste des Démocrates de Progrès	Replaced Edgar Faure on 9 February 1966
1974–1983	Pierre Jeambrun	Rassemblement Démocratique et Social Européen	
1974–1983	Jean Gravier	Union Centriste des Démocrates de Progrès	
1983–1992	Pierre Brantus	Union Centriste	Died 17 September 1989
1983–1992	André Jourdain	none	Replaced Pierre Brantus 18 September 1989
1992–2001	Pierre Jeambrun	Rassemblement Démocratique et Social Européen	Died 7 February 2001
1992–2001	Pierre Guichard	Rassemblement Démocratique et Social Européen	Replaced Pierre Jeambrun 8 February 2001
1992–2001	André Jourdain	none	
2001–2011	Gérard Bailly	Les Républicains	
2001–2011	Gilbert Barbier	Rassemblement Démocratique et Social Européen	
2011–2017	Gérard Bailly	Les Républicains	
2011–2017	Gilbert Barbier	Rassemblement Démocratique et Social Européen	
2017–present	Sylvie Vermeillet	Union Centriste	
2017–present	Marie-Christine Chauvin	Les Républicains	

== Sources ==
- Liste des anciens sénateurs de la IIIème République par circonscription (in French), Sénat de France
- Liste des anciens sénateurs de la IVème République par circonscription (in French), Sénat de France
- Liste des anciens sénateurs de la Vème République par circonscription (in French), Sénat de France
- Liste par département – Jura (in French), Sénat de France
