= List of senators of Saône-et-Loire =

Location of Saône-et-Loire in France

Following is a list of senators of Saône-et-Loire, people who have represented the department of Saône-et-Loire in the Senate of France.

== Third Republic ==
Senators for Saône-et-Loire under the French Third Republic were:

- Charles Rolland en 1876)
- Philippe Pernette (1876–1878)
- Charles Guillemaut (1876–1886)
- Alfred Mathey (1879–1892)
- Charles Demole (1879–1908)
- Félix Martin (1887–1924)
- François Dulac (1892–1900)
- Gabriel Magnien (1898–1914)
- Lucien Guillemaut (1898–1917)
- Léon Gillot (1900–1907)
- Jean Richard (1908–1929)
- Ferdinand Sarrien (1909–1915)
- Claude Desgranges (1920–1921)
- Jean Bouveri (1920–1924)
- Paul Gerbe (1920–1925)
- Julien Simyan (1921–1926)
- Claude Petitjean (1924–1932)
- Georges Duprey (1924–1936)
- Émile Chopin (1925–1935)
- Jean Pelletier (1927–1940)
- Charles Borgeot (1929–1940)
- Philibert Cochard (1933–1937)
- Henry Turlier (1935–1940)
- Henri Maupoil (1936–1940)
- Marcel Desprès (1937–1940)

== Fourth Republic ==
Senators for Saône-et-Loire under the French Fourth Republic were:

- François Mercier (1946–1948)
- Julien Satonnet (1946–1948)
- Jean-Marie Thomas (1946–1948)
- Joseph Renaud (1948–1951)
- Henri Maupoil (1948–1958)
- Henri Varlot (1948–1958)
- Jules Pinsard (1951–1959)
- Marcel Legros (1958–1959)
- Xavier Perrier-Michon (1958–1959)

== Fifth Republic ==
Senators for Saône-et-Loire under the French Fifth Republic:

- Roger Lagrange (1959–1967)
- Marcel Legros (1959–1971)
- Jules Pinsard (1959–1977)
- Marcel Mathy (1967–1982)
- Marcel Lucotte (1971–1995)
- France Lechenault (1977–1986)
- Bernard Desbrière (1982–1986)
- André Pourny (1986–2004)
- André Jarrot (1986–1995)
- René Beaumont (UMP) (2004–2014)
- Jean-Patrick Courtois (UMP) (2014–2015) Dismissed
- Jean-Paul Emorine (UMP) From 2014
- Jérôme Durain (Parti socialiste) From 2014
- Marie Mercier (Les Républicains), From June 2015, replacing Jean-Patrick Courtois, dismissed

== Sources ==
- Liste des anciens sénateurs de la IIIème République par circonscription (in French), Sénat de France
- Liste des anciens sénateurs de la IVème République par circonscription (in French), Sénat de France
- Liste des anciens sénateurs de la Vème République par circonscription (in French), Sénat de France
- Liste par département - Saône-et-Loire (in French), Sénat de France
