= List of senators of Corrèze =

Location of Corrèze in France

Following is a list of senators of Corrèze, people who have represented the department of Corrèze in the Senate of France.

== Third Republic ==
Senators for Corrèze under the French Third Republic were:

- Joseph Brunet (1876–1885)
- Guy Lafond (Saint-Mur) (1876–1894)
- Auguste Le Cherbonnier (1885–1894)
- Léonce (Sal) (1886–1907)
- Philippe-Michel Labrousse (1894–1910)
- François Dellestable (1894–1921)
- Hippolyte Rouby (1907–1920)
- Étienne Bussière (1911–1921)
- Henry de Jouvenel (1921–1935)
- Joseph Faure (1921–1939)
- François Labrousse (1921–1941)
- Henri Queuille (1935–1945)
- Jacques (Chammard) (1939–1945)

== Fourth Republic ==
Senators for Corrèze under the French Fourth Republic were:

- Maurice Rouel (1946–1948)
- Marcel Champeix (1946–1959)
- François Labrousse (1948–1951)
- Jean-Alexis Jaubert (1952–1959)

== Fifth Republic ==
Senators for Corrèze under the French Fifth Republic:

In office	Name	Group	Notes
1959–1968	Marcel Audy	Groupe de la Gauche Démocratique	Died in office 6 January 1968
1959–1980	Marcel Champeix	Groupe socialiste	
1968–1971	Roger Courbatère	Groupe de la Gauche Démocratique	Replaced Marcel Audy on 7 January 1968
1971–1980	Jacques Coudert	Groupe de l'Union des Démocrates pour la République	
1980–1998	Henri Belcour	Groupe du Rassemblement pour la République	
1980–2008	Georges Mouly	Groupe du Rassemblement Démocratique et Social Européen	
1998–2008	Bernard Murat	Groupe Union pour un Mouvement Populaire	
2008–2014	Bernadette Bourzai	Groupe socialiste et apparentés	
2008–2014	René Teulade	Groupe socialiste et apparentés	Died in office 13 February 2014
2014	Patricia Bordas	Groupe socialiste et apparentés	Replaced René Teulade 14 February 2014
2014–present	Daniel Chasseing	Groupe Les Indépendants – République et Territoires	
2014–present	Claude Nougein	Groupe Les Républicains	

== Sources ==
- Liste des anciens sénateurs de la IIIème République par circonscription (in French), Sénat de France
- Liste des anciens sénateurs de la IVème République par circonscription (in French), Sénat de France
- Liste des anciens sénateurs de la Vème République par circonscription (in French), Sénat de France
- Liste par département – Corrèze (in French), Sénat de France
