= Albéric de Montgolfier =

French politician

Member of the French Senate for Eure-et-Loir
- Incumbent
- Assumed office 1 October 2008
- Preceded by: Joël Billard

Personal details
- Born: 6 July 1964 (age 62) Neuilly-sur-Seine, France
- Party: The Republicans
- Spouse: Audrey Hamon (m. 2005)
- Children: 2
- Education: Sciences Po; Paris Dauphine University; Panthéon-Assas University
- Profession: Lawyer

Albéric de Montgolfier (born 6 July 1964) is a member of the Senate of France, representing the Eure-et-Loir department. He is a member of The Republicans.
