= Jacques Golliet =

French politician (1931–2020)

Mayor of Thônes
- In office 1974–1983

General Councillor of the Canton of Thônes
- In office 1982–1992
- Preceded by: Aimé Dupont
- Succeeded by: Jean-Paul Amoudry

French Senator from Haute-Savoie
- In office 28 September 1986 – 1 October 1995
- Parliamentary group: Centrist Union group

Personal details
- Born: 14 December 1931 Annecy, Haute-Savoie, France
- Died: 31 October 2020 (aged 88)
- Party: UDF; CDS

Jacques Golliet (14 December 1931, Annecy – 31 October 2020) was a French politician. He served as a Senator from Haute-Savoie from 28 September 1986 to 1 October 1995.

== Biography ==
A professor and lecturer, Golliet began his political career as Mayor of Thônes in 1974, succeeding Joseph-François Angelloz. He then became General Councillor. He was elected to the Senate in 1986, representing Haute-Savoie, and staying in power until 1995. While at the Luxembourg Palace, he was a member of the Committee for Foreign Affairs, Defense and the Armed Forces. He was also one of the Senators behind the creation of the International Information Group on Tibet.

Jacques Golliet died on 31 October 2020 at the age of 88.
