= List of senators of Drôme =

Location of Drôme in France

Following is a list of senators of Drôme, people who have represented the department of Drôme in the Senate of France.

== Third Republic ==
Senators for Drôme under the French Third Republic were:

- Jean Lamorte (1876–1884)
- César Malens (1876–1885)
- Émile Loubet (1885–1899)
- Joseph Fayard (1885–1908)
- Antoine Chevandier (1892–1893)
- Paul Laurens (1893–1901)
- Louis Bizarelli (1899–1902)
- Maurice-Louis Faure (1902–1919)
- Louis Blanc (1903–1914)
- Charles-Marie Chabert (1908–1923)
- Joseph Reynaud (1920–1924)
- Henri Perdrix (1920–1945)
- Émile Lisbonne (1924–1939)
- Désiré Valette (1924–1939)
- François Eynard (1939–1945)
- Félix Rozier (1939–1945)

== Fourth Republic ==
Senators for Drôme under the French Fourth Republic were:

- André Bossanne (1946–1948)
- Albin Vilhet (1946–1948)
- Marius Moutet (1948–1959)
- Maurice Pic (politician) (1948–1959)

== Fifth Republic ==
Senators for Drôme under the French Fifth Republic:

In office	Name	Party or group	Notes
1959–1968	Marius Moutet	Socialiste	Died in office 29 October 1968
1959–1980	Maurice Vérillon	Socialiste	
1968–1971	Lucien Junillon	none	From 30 October 1968 in place of Marius Moutet
1971–1989	Maurice Pic (politician)	Socialiste	
1980–1996	Gérard Gaud	Socialiste	Died in office 3 September 1996
1989–2014	Jean Besson	Socialiste et apparentés	
1996–2014	Bernard Piras	Socialiste et apparentés	From 4 September 1996 in place of Gérard Gaud
2008–present	Didier Guillaume	Socialiste et républicain	
2014–present	Gilbert Bouchet	Les Républicains	
2014–present	Jean-François Longeot	Union Centriste	

== Sources ==
- Liste des anciens sénateurs de la IIIème République par circonscription (in French), Sénat de France
- Liste des anciens sénateurs de la IVème République par circonscription (in French), Sénat de France
- Liste des anciens sénateurs de la Vème République par circonscription (in French), Sénat de France
- Liste par département – Drôme (in French), Sénat de France
