= List of senators of Haute-Saône =

Location of Haute-Saône in France

Following is a list of senators of Haute-Saône, people who have represented the department of Haute-Saône in the Senate of France.

== Third Republic ==
Senators for Haute-Saône under the French Third Republic were:

- Adéodat Dufournel (1876–1882)
- Louis Jobard (1876–1891)
- Jean Noblot (1882–1891)
- Jean-Baptiste Levrey (1891–1900)
- Achille Coillot (1893–1900)
- Jean-Baptiste Brusset (1891–1897)
- Maurice Signard (1897–1900 and 1903)
- Gustave Gauthier (1900–1909)
- Charles Bontemps (1900–1903)
- Gaston Outhenin-Chalandre (1900–1907)
- Victor Genoux-Prachée (1904-1920)
- Maurice Couyba (1907–1920)
- Jules Jeanneney (1909–1927)
- Anatole Gras (1920–1927)
- Henry Marsot (1920–1927)
- Jules Hayaux (1927–1936)
- Jules Jeanneney (1927–1940)
- Alcime Renaudot (1927–1936)
- André Maroselli (1936–1940)
- Moïse Levy (1936–1940)

== Fourth Republic ==
Senators for Haute-Saône under the French Fourth Republic were:

- Marcellin Carraud, républicain indépendant (1958)
- Henri Pretre, républicain indépendant (1958)
- Fernand Perrot-Migeon, gauche démocratique (1952-1958)
- André Maroselli, radical-socialiste (1952-1956)
- Pierre Vitter, RPF (1948-1952)
- René Depreux, RPF (1946-1952)

== Fifth Republic ==
Senators for Haute-Saône under the French Fifth Republic:

Term	Name	Party or group	Notes
1959–1968	Henri Pretre	Républicains et Indépendants	
1959–1968	André Maroselli	Gauche Démocratique	
1968–1977	Michel Miroudot	Républicains et Indépendants	
1968–1977	Henri Pretre	Républicains et Indépendants	
1977–1986	Michel Miroudot	Républicains et Indépendants	
1977–1986	Pierre Louvot	Républicains et Indépendants	
1986–1995	Michel Miroudot	Républicains et Indépendants	
1986–1995	Pierre Louvot	Républicains et Indépendants	
1995–2004	Alain Joyandet	Les Républicains	Until 18 June 2002 (elected deputy)
1995–2004	Christian Bergelin	Union pour un Mouvement Populaire	From 29 September 2002; Election annulled 19 December 2002
1995–2004	Yves Krattinger	Socialiste et apparentés	From 9 February 2003 in place of Christian Bergelin
1995–2004	Bernard Joly	Rassemblement Démocratique et Social Européen	
2004–2014	Yves Krattinger	Socialiste et apparentés	
2004–2014	Jean-Pierre Michel	Socialiste et apparentés	
2014-present	Alain Joyandet	Les Républicains	
2014-present	Michel Raison	Les Républicains	

== Sources ==
- Liste des anciens sénateurs de la IIIème République par circonscription (in French), Sénat de France
- Liste des anciens sénateurs de la IVème République par circonscription (in French), Sénat de France
- Liste des anciens sénateurs de la Vème République par circonscription (in French), Sénat de France
- Liste par département – Haute-Saône (in French), Sénat de France
