= List of senators of Meurthe-et-Moselle =

Location of Meurthe-et-Moselle in France

Following is a list of senators of Meurthe-et-Moselle, people who have represented the department of Meurthe-et-Moselle in the Senate of France.

== Third Republic ==
Senators for Meurthe-et-Moselle under the French Third Republic were:

- Auguste Bernard (1876–1883)
- Henri Varroy (1876–18830
- Albert Berlet (1883–1886)
- Henri Marquis (1883–1906)
- François Volland (1886–1900)
- Alfred Mézières (1900–1915)
- Hippolyte Langlois (1906–1912)
- Gustave Chapuis (1911–1920)
- Ferdinand de Langenhagen (1912–1917)
- Albert François Lebrun (1920–1932) Resigned, elected president of France
- Henri Michaut (1920–1933)
- Louis Michel (1920–1936)
- Gaston Rogé (1933–1941)
- François de Wendel (1933–1941)
- Charles-Henri Cournault (1934–1941)

== Fourth Republic ==
Senators for Meurthe-et-Moselle under the French Fourth Republic were:

- Émile Fournier (1946–1948)
- Georges Lacaze (1946–19480
- Robert Gravier (1946–1959)
- Jean Lionel-Pèlerin (1948–1952)
- Max Mathieu (1948–1952)
- Raymond Pinchard (1952–1959)
- François Valentin (1956–1958)
- Pierre de Boissonneaux de Chevigny (1952–1956)

== Fifth Republic ==
Senators for Meurthe-et-Moselle under the French Fifth Republic were:

- Raymond Pinchard (1959–1961)
- Pierre de Boissonneaux de Chevigny (1959–1974)
- Robert Gravier (1959–1974)
- Joseph de Pommery (1961–1965)
- Marcel Martin (1965–1974)
- Roger Boileau (1974–1992)
- Hubert Martin (1974–1992)
- Richard Pouille (1974–1992)
- Claude Huriet (1983–2001)
- Jean Bernadaux (1992–2001)
- Jacques Baudot (1992–2007)
- Jacqueline Panis (2007–2011)
- Évelyne Didier (2001–2017)
- Daniel Reiner (2001–2017)

As of January 2018 the senators were:

Name	Took office	Group	Notes
Philippe Nachbar	1992	Union for a Popular Movement (UMP)	
Jean-François Husson	2011	Miscellaneous right	
Véronique Guillotin	2017	Union of Democrats and Independents (UDI)	
Olivier Jacquin	2017	Socialist Party (PS)	

== Sources ==
- Liste des anciens sénateurs de la IIIème République par circonscription (in French), Sénat de France
- Liste des anciens sénateurs de la IVème République par circonscription (in French), Sénat de France
- Liste des anciens sénateurs de la Vème République par circonscription (in French), Sénat de France
- Liste par département - Meurthe-et-Moselle (in French), Sénat de France
