= Henri Bompard =

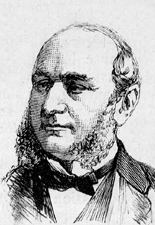

Deputy for Meuse
- In office 8 February 1871 – 31 December 1875

Senator of Meuse
- In office 30 January 1876 – 4 January 1879

Personal details
- Born: Henri-Raymond Bompard; 2 March 1821 Bar-le-Duc, Meuse, France
- Died: 19 February 1906 (aged 84) Paris, France
- Occupation: Industrialist, politician

Henri Bompard (2 March 1821 – 19 February 1906) was a French industrialist who became a politician during the early years of the French Third Republic, serving first as Deputy and then as Senator of the Meuse department.

== Life ==
Henri-Raymond Bompard was born in Bar-le-Duc, Meuse, on 2 March 1821. His parent were Hector Bompard (1794–1862) and Henriette Henry (1797–1875). He married Élise Lecoy (1824–1886), and they had a daughter Élisabeth Bompard (1848–1915). He became the head of an important spinning house. He was a member and for some time president of the Bar-le-Duc Chamber of Commerce. He was mayor of Bar-le-Duc during the Franco-Prussian War (1870). He was made a Knight of the Legion of Honour on 22 August 1871.

Bompard was elected representative of Meuse on 8 February 1871. At first he voted with the right for peace, for public prayers, for abrogation of the law of exiles and against the return of the Assembly to Paris. Later he moved towards the center left, joining the Centre gauche parliamentary group. On 24 May 1873 he refrained from voting for the resignation of Adolphe Thiers. On 23 July 1873 he voted for Jean Casimir-Perier's proposal on the organization of the republic. On 22 November 1874 he resigned as mayor of Bar-le-Duc. On 25 February 1875 he supported all the constitutional laws.

On 30 January 1876 Bompard was elected in the Meuse senatorial election by a clear majority on the constitutionalist platform. He sat with the constitutional group but on some issues voted with the right. He was a member of the General Council of the Meuse, and president of that body until 1878. He was defeated in the senatorial elections of 5 January 1879.

Bompard retired from politics and settled in Paris, where he died on 19 February 1906, aged 85.

== Sources ==
- Bellot-Herment, François Alexis Théodore (1863), Historique de la ville de Bar-le-Duc (in French), chez tous les libraires
- Bureau, Patrick, Henry BOMPARD (in French)
- Jolly, Jean (1960–1977), "BOMPARD (HENRI, RAYMOND)", Dictionnaire des Parlementaires français (in French)
- "LH/276/27 BOMPARD Henry Raymond", Leonore (in French)
- Robert, Adolphe; Cougny, Gaston (1889–1891), "BOMPARD (HENRI-RAYMOND))", in Edgar Bourloton (ed.), Dictionnaire des Parlementaires français (1789–1889) (in French)
