= Cécile Cukierman =

French politician (born 1976)

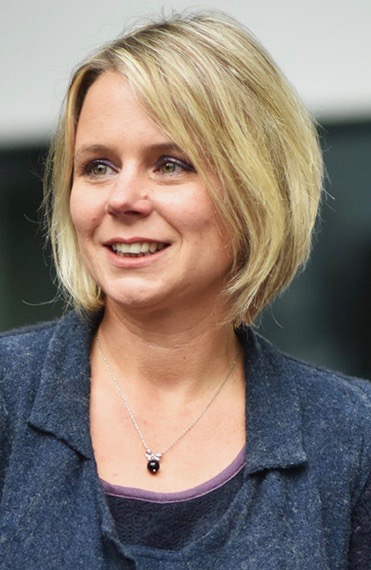
- Cukierman in 2015

Member of the French Senate for Loire
- Incumbent
- Assumed office 1 October 2011
- Preceded by: Josiane Mathon-Poinat

Personal details
- Born: 26 April 1976 (age 50) Bagneux, Hauts-de-Seine, France
- Party: French Communist Party
- Education: Panthéon-Sorbonne University

Cécile Cukierman (born 26 April 1976) is a French politician. She serves as a Communist Senator for the Loire.

== Biography ==
=== Early life ===
Cécile Cukierman was born on 26 April 1976.

=== Career ===
She works as a teacher of history and geography.

She serves as Deputy Mayor of Unieux. She has also been a member of the regional council of Rhône-Alpes since 2004. Additionally, she was elected to the French Senate on 25 September 2011, where she serves on the Commission on Culture, Education and Communication.

=== Personal life ===
She is married, and has three children.
