= List of senators of Mayenne =

Location of Mayenne in France

Following is a List of senators of Mayenne, people who have represented the department of Mayenne in the Senate of France.

== Third Republic ==
Term	Senators
1876–1879	Jules Bernard-Dutreil died 15 June 1876, replaced by Paul Bernard-Dutreil; Étienne Duboys Fresney
1879–1888	Gustave Denis; Étienne Duboys Fresney
1888–1897	Paul Bernard-Dutreil; Paul Le Breton
1897–1906	Victor Boissel; Gustave Denis
1899–1906	Étienne Albert Duboys Fresney
1906–1919	Charles Daniel; Christian d'Elva; Paul Le Breton died 1915
1920–1924	Gustave Denis; Christian d'Elva; Constant Jouis
1924–1933	Christian d'Elva died 1925 replaced by Eugène Jamin; Gustave Denis died 1925 replaced by Edmond Leblanc; Henri de Monti de Rezé
1933–1941	Eugène Jamin died 26 October 1933, replaced by Ferdinand Le Pelletier, who died 1939; Edmond Leblanc; Henri de Monti de Rezé

== Fourth Republic ==
Term	Senators
1946–1948	Maurice Brier - SFIO; Jean Helleu - MRP
1948–1955	Jacques Delalande - RPF; Francis Le Basser - RPF
1955–1959	Jacques Delalande - Républicains indépendants; Francis Le Basser - RPF

== Fifth Republic ==
Term	Senators
1959–1965	Jacques Delalande - Républicains indépendants; Francis Le Basser - RPF
1965–1974	Raoul Vadepied - MRP; Lucien de Montigny - MRP
1974–1983	Raoul Vadepied - Union centriste; Lucien de Montigny - Union centriste
1983–1992	Jean Arthuis - Union centriste replaced by Georges Dessaigne from 21 April 1986 to 31 May 1988; René Ballayer - Union centriste
1992–2001	René Ballayer - Union centriste (died 26 January 2001); Jean Arthuis - Union centriste replaced by Georges Dessaigne from 19 June 1995 to 30 June 1997
2001–2011	Jean Arthuis - Union centriste; François Zocchetto - Union centriste
2011–2017	Jean Arthuis - Union des démocrates et indépendants - UC (resigned 30 June 2014; Élisabeth Doineau - Union des démocrates et indépendants - UC, elected 28 September 2014 to replace Jean Arthuis.; François Zocchetto - Union des démocrates et indépendants - UC
2017–2023	Élisabeth Doineau - UC; Guillaume Chevrollier - Les Républicains
