= List of senators of Savoie =

Location of Savoie in France

Following is a list of senators of Savoie, people who have represented the department of Savoie in the Senate of France.

== Third Republic ==
Senators for Savoie under the French Third Republic were:

Period	Name	Notes
1876-1880	Frédéric d'Alexandry d'Orengiani	
1876-1880	Charles Dupasquier	
1880-1882	Nicolas Parent	
1882-1891	Nicolas Parent	Died in 1890
1882-1891	Charles Forest	
1882-1891	François Carquet	
1891-1900	François Gravin	
1891-1900	Charles Forest	
1900-1909	Antoine Perrier	
1900-1909	François Gravin	
1909-1920	Antoine Perrier	Died in 1914
1909-1920	François Milan	
1909-1920	François Gravin	
1909-1920	César Empereur	
1909-1920	Charles Forest	
1920-1927	François Milan	
1920-1927	Maurice Mollard	
1920-1927	Georges Machet	
1927-1936	François Milan	
1927-1936	Maurice Mollard	
1927-1936	Georges Machet	Died in 1931
1936-1944	François Milan	
1936-1944	Maurice Mollard	
1936-1944	Antoine Borrel	

== Fourth Republic ==
Senators for Savoie under the French Fourth Republic were:

Period	Name
1946-1948	Jules Hyvrard
1946-1948	François Dumas
1948-1952	Pierre de La Gontrie
1948-1952	François Dumas
1952-1958	Pierre de La Gontrie
1952-1958	Paul Chevallier
1958-1959	Pierre de La Gontrie
1958-1959	Paul Chevallier

== Fifth Republic ==
Senators for Savoie under the French Fifth Republic:

Period	Name	Party or group	Notes
1959-1968	Paul Chevallier	Gauche Démocratique	
1959-1968	Pierre de La Gontrie	Gauche Démocratique	
1968-1977	Jean Blanc	Union for French Democracy (UDF)	
1968-1977	Jean-Baptiste Mathias	Union des Démocrates pour la République	Died 22 May 1974
1968-1977	Louis Marré	Républicains et Indépendants	Replaced Jean-Baptiste Mathias
1977-1986	Roger Rinchet	Socialist Party (PS)	
1977-1986	Jean Blanc	Centre of Social Democrats (CDS)	
1986-1995	Pierre Dumas	Rally for the Republic (RPR)	
1986-1995	Jean Blanc	Centre of Social Democrats (CDS)	
1995-2004	Michel Barnier	Rally for the Republic (RPR)	Became minister from 1995 to 1997; Resigned 23 September 1999
1995-2004	Jean-Pierre Vial	Rally for the Republic (RPR) then Union for a Popular Movement (UMP)	Replaced Michel Barnier from 1995 to 1997, from 1999 to 2004
1995-2004	Roger Rinchet	Socialist Party (PS)	
2004-2014	Jean-Pierre Vial	Union for a Popular Movement (UMP)	
2004-2014	Thierry Repentin	Socialist Party (PS)	Minister from July 2012 to May 2014
2004-2014	André Vairetto	Socialist Party (PS)	Replaced Thierry Repentin from July 2012 to May 2014
From 2014	Jean-Pierre Vial	Union for a Popular Movement (UMP) then The Republicans (LR)	
From 2014	Michel Bouvard	Union for a Popular Movement (UMP) then The Republicans (LR)	Resigned 1 June 2017
From 2014	Martine Berthet	The Republicans (LR)	Elected 24 September 2017

== Sources ==
- Liste des anciens sénateurs de la IIIème République par circonscription (in French), Sénat de France
- Liste des anciens sénateurs de la IVème République par circonscription (in French), Sénat de France
- Liste des anciens sénateurs de la Vème République par circonscription (in French), Sénat de France
- Liste par département - Savoie (in French), Sénat de France
