= François Dubanchet =

French politician (1923–2019)

Mayor of Saint-Étienne
- In office 1983–1994
- Preceded by: Joseph Sanguedolce
- Succeeded by: Michel Thiollière

Personal details
- Born: 5 May 1923 Saint-Étienne, France
- Died: 26 March 2019 (aged 95) France
- Party: UDF

François Dubanchet (5 May 1923 – 26 March 2019) was a French politician.
