= Louis Grillot =

French farmer and politician (1932–2022)

Member of the French Senate
- In office 26 February 1998 – 30 September 2008
- Preceded by: Bernard Barbier
- Constituency: Côte-d'Or

Personal details
- Born: 18 April 1932 Le Creusot, France
- Died: 12 August 2022 (aged 90) Beaune, France
- Party: RPR; UMP
- Occupation: Farmer

Louis Grillot (18 April 1932 – 12 August 2022) was a French farmer and politician. A member of the Rally for the Republic and the Union for a Popular Movement, he served in the Senate from 1998 to 2008.

Grillot died in Beaune on 12 August 2022, at the age of 90.
