= André Jourdain (politician) =

French politician (1935–2019)

André Jourdain (13 June 1935 – 16 September 2019) was a French politician.

Jourdain was the Senator for Jura from 1989 to 2001. He was the Mayor of Sapois, Jura between 2001 and 2014.
