= James Bordas =

French politician (1929–2020)

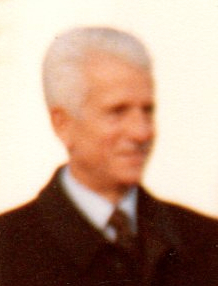
- Bordas in 1985

French Senator from Indre-et-Loire
- In office 27 September 1992 – 30 September 2001

Mayor of Chambray-lès-Tours
- In office 1981–2011

Personal details
- Born: 20 August 1929
- Died: 28 December 2020 (aged 91)

James Bordas (20 August 1929 - 28 December 2020) was a French politician.
