= Alain Fouché =

French politician (born 1942)

Alain Fouché (born 4 December 1942) is a French politician and a former member of the Senate of France. He represented the Vienne department from 2002 to 2020 and is a member of the Union for a Popular Movement Party.

== Biography ==
A Lawyer at the Poitiers Court of Appeal, he became senator for Vienne on June 7, 2002, following the resignation of Jean-Pierre Raffarin, who became Prime Minister. He was elected in his own right on September 26, 2004. He is vice-chairman of the Committee on Sustainable Development and Regional Planning and vice-chairman of the Delegation for Prospective Studies.

A general councilor for the canton of Chauvigny, he was mayor of Chauvigny from 1983 to 2002. He was president of the Vienne General Council from April 2004 to March 2008. He is also president of the Pays Chauvinois. On the departmental council, he chairs the culture and events committee.

He supports Alain Juppé in the 2016 Republican presidential primary.

He sponsored Maël de Calan for the 2017 Republican Party convention, during which Laurent Wauquiez was elected party president.

Alain Fouché is Jean-Pierre Abelin brother-in-law, as the latter is married to his sister.

== Bibliography ==
- Page on the Senate website (in French)
