= Pierre Ngayewang =

Cameroonian politician

Pierre Ngayewang (born 1923, death in 1960) was a politician from Cameroon who was elected to the French Senate in 1958.
