= List of senators of Lot-et-Garonne =

Location of Lot-et-Garonne in France

Following is a list of senators of Lot-et-Garonne, people who have represented the department of Lot-et-Garonne in the Senate of France.

== Third Republic ==
Senators for Lot-et-Garonne under the French Third Republic were:

- Octave de Bastard d'Estang (1876–1879)
- Raymond Noubel (1876–1879)
- Louis Pons (1879–1888)
- Léopold Faye (1879–1900)
- Édouard Laporte (1885–1890)
- Jean-Baptiste Durand (1888–1897)
- Armand Fallières (1890–1906)
- Joseph Chaumié (1897–1919)
- Édouard Giresse (1900–1914)
- Gaston Belhomme (1906–1920)
- Jean Galup (1914–1920)
- Pierre Marraud (1920–1933)
- Georges Laboulbene (1920–1934)
- Gaston Carrère (1920–1936)
- André Fallières (1933–1940)
- Pierre Chaumié (1935–1940)
- Georges Escande (1936–1940)

== Fourth Republic ==
Senators for Lot-et-Garonne under the French Fourth Republic were:

- Jacques Bordeneuve (1946–1959)
- Jean Zyromski (1946–1948)
- Étienne Restat (1948–1959)

== Fifth Republic ==
Senators for Lot-et-Garonne under the French Fifth Republic:

- Jacques Bordeneuve (1959–1967 and 1974–1981)
- Étienne Restat (1959–1971)
- Henri Caillavet (1967–1983)
- Raoul Perpère (1971–1974)
- Raymond Soucaret (1981–2001)
- Jean François-Poncet (UMP) (1983–2011)
- Daniel Soulage (Union centriste) (2001–2011)
- Pierre Camani (PS) (2011–20170
- Henri Tandonnet (DVD) (2011–2017)
- Christine Bonfanti-Dossat (LR) (from 2017)
- Jean-Pierre Moga (from 2017}

== Sources ==
- Liste des anciens sénateurs de la IIIème République par circonscription (in French), Sénat de France
- Liste des anciens sénateurs de la IVème République par circonscription (in French), Sénat de France
- Liste des anciens sénateurs de la Vème République par circonscription (in French), Sénat de France
- Liste par département – Lot-et-Garonne (in French), Sénat de France
