= List of senators of Hautes-Alpes =

Location of Hautes-Alpes in France

Following is a list of senators of Hautes-Alpes, people who have represented the department of Hautes-Alpes in the Senate of France.

== Third Republic ==
Senators for Hautes-Alpes under the French Third Republic were:

Term	Name
1876–1879	Louis de Ventavon
1876–1896	Xavier Blanc
1879–1887	Georges Guiffrey
1888–1899	Cyprien Chaix
1896–1912	Joseph Grimaud
1900–1914	Charles Vagnat
1912–1921	Antoine Blanc
1920–1930	Victor Peytral
1921–1924	Victor Bonniard
1924–1929	Léon Cornand
1929–1945	Maurice de Rothschild
1930–1945	Maurice Toy-Riont

== Fourth Republic ==
Senators for Hautes-Alpes under the French Fourth Republic were:

Term	Name
1946–1948	Émile Marintabouret
1948–1957	Aristide de Bardonnèche
1957–1959	Ludovic Tron

== Fifth Republic ==
Senators for Hautes-Alpes under the French Fifth Republic:

In office	Name	Group	Notes
1959–1968	Ludovic Tron	Socialiste	Died in office 24 October 1968
1968–1971	Jean Aubin	Union Centriste	From 25 October 1968 in place of Ludovic Tron
1971–1989	Émile Didier	Rassemblement Démocratique et Européen	
1989–2007	Marcel Lesbros	Union pour un Mouvement Populaire	Died in office 25 January 2007
2007–2014	Pierre Bernard-Reymond	none	From 26 January 2007 in place of Marcel Lesbros
2014	Jean-Yves Dusserre	Union pour un Mouvement Populaire	Died in office 27 December 2014
2014–present	Patricia Morhet-Richaud	Les Républicains	From 28 December 2014 in place of Jean-Yves Dusserre

== Sources ==
- Liste des anciens sénateurs de la IIIème République par circonscription (in French), Sénat de France
- Liste des anciens sénateurs de la IVème République par circonscription (in French), Sénat de France
- Liste des anciens sénateurs de la Vème République par circonscription (in French), Sénat de France
- Liste par département – Hautes-Alpes (in French), Sénat de France

Senators of the Hautes-Alpes department of France.
