= Roger Morève =

French politician (1897–1983)

Roger Morève (7 June 1897 – 27 September 1983) was a French politician from Mézières-en-Brenne. He represented the Radical Party in the National Assembly from 1951 to 1958 and was in the Senate from 1959 to 1971.
