= List of senators of Gers =

Location of Gers in France

Following is a list of senators of Gers, people who have represented the department of Gers in the Senate of France.

== Third Republic ==
Senators for Gers under the French Third Republic were:

- Anselme Batbie (1876–1887)
- Louis Lacave-Laplagne (1876–1897)
- Philippe de Montesquiou-Fezensac (1887–1897)
- Paul Destieux-Junca (1896–1920)
- Louis Aucoin (1897–1906)
- Alexandre Laterrade (1897–1906)
- Odilon Lannelongue (1906–1911)
- Frédéric Sancet (1906–1920)
- Paul Decker-David (1912–1918)
- Joseph Masclanis (1920–1924)
- Jean-Baptiste Noulens (1920–1924)
- Jean Philip (1920–1941)
- Isidore Tournan (1924–1939)
- Abel Gardey (1924–1941)

== Fourth Republic ==
Senators for Gers under the French Fourth Republic were:

- Auguste Sempé (1946–1948)
- Louis Lafforgue (1948–1955)
- Paul-Émile Descomps (1948–1959)
- Abel Sempé (1955–1959)

== Fifth Republic ==
Senators for Gers under the French Fifth Republic:

- Louis Leygue (1959–1962)
- Abel Sempé (1959–1989)
- Henri Tournan (1962–1980)
- Marc Castex (1980–1989)
- Robert Castaing (1989–1998)
- Aubert Garcia (1989–1998)
- Yves Rispat (1998–2008)
- Aymeri de Montesquiou (1998–2015)
- Franck Montaugé from 2014
- Raymond Vall (2008–2014) and from 2015

== Sources ==
- Liste des anciens sénateurs de la IIIème République par circonscription (in French), Sénat de France
- Liste des anciens sénateurs de la IVème République par circonscription (in French), Sénat de France
- Liste des anciens sénateurs de la Vème République par circonscription (in French), Sénat de France
- Liste par département – Gers (in French), Sénat de France
