= List of senators of Vendée =

Location of Vendée in France

Following is a list of senators of Vendée, people who have represented the department of Vendée in the Senate of France.

== Third Republic ==
Senators for Vendée under the French Third Republic were:

Name	In office	Notes
Auguste de Cornulier de La Lande	1876–1886	Died in office 13 February 1886
Baptiste Guinaudeau	1876–1887	Died in office 1 February 1887
Marie Edouard Benjamin Vandier	1876–1878	Died in office 28 August 1878
Stéphane Halgan	1879–1882	Died in office 19 January 1882
Emmanuel Halgan	1885–1917	Died in office 21 October 1917
Amédée de Béjarry	1886–1916	Died in office 1916
Alfred Biré	1887–1897	Died in office 1 May 1897
Paul Le Roux	1897–1923	Died in office 26 April 1923
Henri de Lavrignais	1920–1927	Died in office 20 February 1927
Maurice Morand	1920–1933	Died in office 28 April 1933
Armand Charles de Baudry d'Asson	1927–1936	
Raymond de Fontaines	1923–1944	
Louis Rambaud	1933–1944	Died in office 22 May 1944
Léopold Robert	1936–1944	

== Fourth Republic ==
Senators for Vendée under the French Fourth Republic were:

Name	In office	Party
Jacques Chaumel	1946–1948	Popular Republican Movement (MRP)
Henri Rochereau	1946–1959	not aligned
Jacques de Maupeou	1948–1949	Rally of the French People (RPF)

== Fifth Republic ==
Senators for Vendée under the French Fifth Republic:

Name	In office	Group	Notes
Henri Rochereau	1959	Independent Republicans (RI)	Appointed to cabinet 28 June 1959
Hubert Durand	1959–1977	Independent Republicans (RI)	Replaced Henri Rochereau 29 June 1959
Jacques de Maupeou	1959–1963	Independent Republicans (RI)	Died 22 January 1963
Pierre Roy	1963–1968	Independent Republicans (RI)	Replaced Jacques de Maupeou on 23 January 1963
Yves Durand	1968–1986	none	
Michel Crucis	1977–1995	Independent Republicans (RI)	
Lionel de Tinguy du Pouët	1977–1981	Centrist Union group (UC)	Died 9 September 1981
Louis Caiveau	1981–1987	Centrist Union group (UC)	Replaced Lionel de Tinguy du Pouët 10 September 1981; Died 27 February 1987
Jacques Oudin	1986–2004	Union for a Popular Movement (UMP)	
Louis Moinard	1987–2004	Centrist Union group (UC)	Replaced Louis Caiveau on 27 February 1987
Philippe Darniche	1995–2014	none	
Bruno Retailleau	From 2004	The Republicans (LR)	
Jean-Claude Merceron	2004–2014	Centrist Union group (UC)	
Didier Mandelli	From 2014	The Republicans (LR)	
Annick Billon	From 2014	Centrist Union group (UC)	

== Sources ==
- Liste des anciens sénateurs de la IIIème République par circonscription (in French), Sénat de France
- Liste des anciens sénateurs de la IVème République par circonscription (in French), Sénat de France
- Liste des anciens sénateurs de la Vème République par circonscription (in French), Sénat de France
- Liste par département - Vendée (in French), Sénat de France
