= List of senators of Haute-Corse =

Location of Haute-Corse in France

Following is a list of senators of Haute-Corse, people who have represented the department of Haute-Corse in the Senate of France. The department was formed on 15 September 1975, when the department of Corsica was divided into Haute-Corse and Corse-du-Sud.

== Fifth Republic ==
Senators for Haute-Corse under the French Fifth Republic:

| Period | | Name | Party | Notes |
|---|---|---|---|---|
| 1975 | 1997 | François Giacobbi | European Democratic and Social Rally group (RDSE) | Formerly senator for Corsica. Died 7 March 1997 |
| 1997 | 1998 | Jean-Baptiste Motroni | Groupe socialiste | Replaced François Giacobbi on 8 March 1997 |
| 1998 | 2005 | Paul Natali | Union for a Popular Movement (UMP) | Resigned 19 March 2005 |
| 2005 | 2014 | François Vendasi | European Democratic and Social Rally group (RDSE) | |
| 2014 | Incumbent | Joseph Castelli | European Democratic and Social Rally group (RDSE) | |

== Sources ==
- Liste des anciens sénateurs de la Vème République par circonscription (in French), Sénat de France
- Liste par département – Haute-Corse (in French), Sénat de France
