= Louis-Ferdinand de Rocca Serra =

French politician (1936–2021)

Member of the French Senate
- In office 20 February 1994 – 20 September 2001
- Preceded by: Charles Ornano
- Succeeded by: Nicolas Alfonsi
- Constituency: Corse-du-Sud

Personal details
- Born: 7 February 1936
- Died: 18 December 2021 (aged 85)
- Party: RI

Louis-Ferdinand de Rocca Serra (7 February 1936 – 18 December 2021) was a French politician. A member of the Independent Republicans, he served in the Senate from 1994 to 2001.
