= Ralijaona Laingo =

Malagasy politician

Ralijaona Laingo (born 25 May 1905 in Antananambo, Madagascar; died 30 May 1986) was a politician from Madagascar who served in the French Senate from 1952-1958.
