= List of senators of Deux-Sèvres =

Location of Deux-Sèvres in France

Following is a list of senators of Deux-Sèvres, people who have represented the department of Deux-Sèvres in the Senate of France.

== Third Republic ==
Senators for Deux-Sèvres under the French Third Republic were:

- Alfred Monnet (1876–1882)
- Alcide Taillefert (1876–1882)
- Marie-Clément de Reignié (1882–1885)
- Pierre Goguet (1882–1886)
- Émile Bergeon (1885–1891)
- François Garran de Balzan (1886–1902)
- Léo Aymé (1891)
- Camille Jouffrault (1891–1905)
- Théodore Girard (1895–1918)
- Louis Aguillon (1903–1920)
- Léopold Goirand (1906–1920)
- Hippolyte Gentil (1920–1927)
- Pierre Brangier (1920–1927)
- René Héry (1920–1940)
- Louis Dutaud (1927–1929)
- André Goirand (1927–1940)
- Louis Demellier (1929–1940)

== Fourth Republic ==
Senators for Deux-Sèvres under the French Fourth Republic were:

- Émile Poirault (1946–1948)
- Yvon Coudé du Foresto (1946–1948 and 1955–1959)
- Camille Héline (1948–1952)
- Félix Lelant (1948–1957)
- Jacques Ménard (1957–1959)

== Fifth Republic ==
Senators for Deux-Sèvres under the French Fifth Republic:

In office	Name	Party	Notes
1959–1986	Jacques Ménard	Union des Républicains et des Indépendants	
1959–1977	Yvon Coudé du Foresto	Union Centriste des Démocrates de Progrès	
1977–1995	Georges Treille	Union Centriste	
1986–1995	Jean Dumont	Républicains et Indépendants	
1995–2014	Michel Bécot	Union pour un Mouvement Populaire	
1995–2014	André Dulait	Union pour un Mouvement Populaire	
2014-present	Philippe Mouiller	Les Républicains	
2014-present	Jean-Marie Morisset	Les Républicains	

== Sources ==
- Liste des anciens sénateurs de la IIIème République par circonscription (in French), Sénat de France
- Liste des anciens sénateurs de la IVème République par circonscription (in French), Sénat de France
- Liste des anciens sénateurs de la Vème République par circonscription (in French), Sénat de France
- Liste par département – Deux-Sèvres (in French), Sénat de France
