= List of senators of Dordogne =

Location of Dordogne in France

Following is a list of senators of Dordogne, people who have represented the department of Dordogne in the Senate of France.

== Third Republic ==
Senators for Dordogne under the French Third Republic were:

- Paul Dupont (1876–1879)
- Pierre Magne (1876–1879)
- Philippe Daussel (1876–1883)
- Jean-Baptiste Dupont de Bosredon (1880–1885)
- Oscar Bardi de Fourtou (1880–1885)
- Jean Garrigat (1885–1891)
- Jean Roger (1885–1901)
- Alcide Dusolier (1885–1912)
- Antoine Gadaud (1891–1897)
- Arnaud Denoix (1896–1917)
- Samuel Jean de Pozzi (1898–1903)
- Pierre Guillier (1901–1927)
- Jean Peyrot (1903–1917)
- Ferdinand de La Batut (1912–1930)
- Bernard Eymery (1920–1928)
- Albert Claveille (1920–1921)
- Léon Sireyjol (1921–1945)
- Marcel Michel (1928–1945)
- Félix Gadaud (1929–1945)
- Georges Faugère (1930–1936)
- Adrien Bels (1936–1945)

== Fourth Republic ==
Senators for Dordogne under the French Fourth Republic were:

- Jeanne Vigier (1946–1948)
- Marc Bardon-Damarzid (1946–1955)
- Marcel Breton (1948–1951)
- Adrien Bels (1951–1955)
- Marcel Brégégère (1955–1959)
- Yvon Delbos (1955–1956)
- Pierre Pugnet (1957–1959)

== Fifth Republic ==
Senators for Dordogne under the French Fifth Republic:

In office	Name	Group	Notes
1959–1980	Marcel Brégégère	Socialiste	
1959–1971	Charles Sinsout	Gauche Démocratique	
1971–1980	Robert Lacoste	Socialiste	
1980–1988	Lucien Delmas	Socialiste	Died in office 5 February 1988
1989–1997	Yves Guéna	Rassemblement pour la République	Until 12 January 1997 (named to constitutional council)
1980–1998	Michel Manet	Socialiste	
1988–1989	Roger Roudier	Socialiste	From 6 February 1988 in place of Lucien Delmas
1997–1998	Gérard Fayolle	Rassemblement pour la République	From 13 January 1997 in place of Yves Guéna
From 1998	Bernard Cazeau	La République En Marche	
1998–2002	Xavier Darcos	Rassemblement pour la République	Until 7 June 2002 (named to cabinet)
2002–2008	Dominique Mortemousque	Union pour un Mouvement Populaire	From 8 June 2002 in place of Xavier Darcos
from 2008	Claude Bérit-Débat	Socialiste et républicain	

== Sources ==
- Liste des anciens sénateurs de la IIIème République par circonscription (in French), Sénat de France
- Liste des anciens sénateurs de la IVème République par circonscription (in French), Sénat de France
- Liste des anciens sénateurs de la Vème République par circonscription (in French), Sénat de France
- Liste par département – Dordogne (in French), Sénat de France
