= List of senators of Sarthe =

Location of Sarthe in France

Following is a list of senators of Sarthe, people who have represented the department of Sarthe in the Senate of France.

== Third Republic ==
Senators for Sarthe under the French Third Republic were:

- Eugène Caillaux (1876–1882)
- Auguste de Talhouët-Roy (1876–1882)
- Michel Vétillart (1876–1882)
- Louis Cordelet (1882–1923)
- Pierre Le Monnier (1882–1895)
- Anselme Rubillard (1882–1891)
- Alphonse Le Porché (1891–1902)
- Prosper Legludic (1895–1904)
- Georges Le Chevalier (1903–1909)
- Paul Henri Balluet d'Estournelles de Constant (1904–1924)
- André Lebert (1909–1942)
- Pierre Ajam (1924–1927)
- Édouard Gigon (1924–1925)
- Joseph Caillaux (1925–1944)
- Almire Breteau (1927–1930)
- René Buquin (1930–1936)
- Albert Thibault (1936–1940)

== Fourth Republic ==
Senators for Sarthe under the French Fourth Republic were:

- Max Boyer (1946–1948)
- Jean de Montgascon (1946–1948)
- Jean-Yves Chapalain (1948–1958)
- Raymond Dronne (1948–1951)
- Philippe d'Argenlieu (1951–1959) Rally of the French People (RPF)

== Fifth Republic ==
Senators for Sarthe under the French Fifth Republic:

In office	Name	Group	Notes
1959–1968	Philippe d'Argenlieu	Union pour la Nouvelle République	
1959–1968	Robert Chevalier	Union pour la Nouvelle République	
1959–1963	François de Nicolay	Républicains et Indépendants	Died 21 November 1963
1963–1968	André Bruneau	Union des Républicains et des Indépendants	Replaced François de Nicolay
1968–1977	Ladislas du Luart	Républicains Indépendants d'Action Sociale	
1968–1977	Jacques Maury	Union Centriste des Démocrates de Progrès	
1968–1977	Fernand Poignant	Socialiste	
1977–2014	Roland du Luart	Union pour un Mouvement Populaire	
1977–1995	Michel d'Aillières	Républicains et Indépendants	
1977–2004	Jacques Chaumont	Union pour un Mouvement Populaire	
1995–2014	Marcel-Pierre Cléach	Union pour un Mouvement Populaire	
2004	François Fillon	Union pour un Mouvement Populaire	Became cabinet member in November 2004
2004–2005	Jean-Pierre Chauveau	Union pour un Mouvement Populaire	Replaced François Fillon November 2004; Resigned 27 June 2005
2005–2007	François Fillon	Union pour un Mouvement Populaire	Became prime minister on 17 June 2007
2004–2014	Jean-Pierre Chauveau	Union pour un Mouvement Populaire	Replaced François Fillon 18 June 2007
2014–2017	Jean-Claude Boulard	La République En Marche	Resigned September 2017
from 2017	Nadine Grelet-Certenais	Socialiste et républicain	Replaced Jean-Claude Boulard in October 2017
from 2014	Louis-Jean de Nicolaÿ	Les Républicains	
from 2014	Jean Pierre Vogel	Les Républicains	

== Sources ==
- Liste des anciens sénateurs de la IIIème République par circonscription (in French), Sénat de France
- Liste des anciens sénateurs de la IVème République par circonscription (in French), Sénat de France
- Liste des anciens sénateurs de la Vème République par circonscription (in French), Sénat de France
- Liste par département - Sarthe (in French), Sénat de France
