= List of senators of Côte-d'Or =

Location of Côte-d'Or in France

Following is a list of senators of Côte-d'Or, people who have represented the department of Côte-d'Or in the Senate of France.

== Third Republic ==
Senators for Côte-d'Or under the French Third Republic were:

- Claude Lacomme (1876–1885)
- Charles Mazeau (1876–1903)
- Louis Hugot (1885–1907)
- Pierre Joigneaux (1891–1894)
- Eugène Spuller (1892–1896)
- Edme Piot (1897–1903)
- Henri Ricard (1903–1910)
- Anatole Philipot (1907–1921)
- Claude Chauveau (1910–1945)
- Ernest Messner (1910–1921)
- Pierre Jossot (1920–1941)
- Auguste Montenot (1921–1935)
- Émile Vincent (1936–1945)

== Fourth Republic ==
Senators for Côte-d'Or under the French Fourth Republic were:

- Henri Guénin (1946–1948)
- Roger Duchet (1946–1959)
- Bénigne Fournier (1948–1959)
- Étienne Viallanesh (1957–1959)

== Fifth Republic ==
Senators for Côte-d'Or under the French Fifth Republic:

Term	Name	Group	Notes
1959–1962	Roger Duchet	Républicains et Indépendants	
1959–1962	Étienne Viallanes	Républicains et Indépendants	
1962–1971	Roger Duchet	Républicains et Indépendants	
1962–1971	André Picard	Républicains et Indépendants	
1971–1980	André Picard	Républicains et Indépendants	Died in office 5 July 1979
1971–1980	Bernard Barbier	Républicains et Indépendants	From 6 July 1979 in place of André Picard
1971–1980	Michel Sordel	Union des Républicains et des Indépendants	
1980–1989	Bernard Barbier	Républicains et Indépendants	
1980–1989	Maurice Lombard	Rassemblement pour la République	
1980–1989	Michel Sordel	Union des Républicains et des Indépendants	
1989–1998	Bernard Barbier	Républicains et Indépendants	Died in office 25 February 1998
1989–1998	Louis Grillot	Union pour un Mouvement Populaire	From 26 February 1998 in place of Bernard Barbier
1989–1998	Maurice Lombard	Rassemblement pour la République	
1989–1998	Henri Revol	Union pour un Mouvement Populaire	
1998–2008	Louis de Broissia	Union pour un Mouvement Populaire	
1998–2008	Louis Grillot	Union pour un Mouvement Populaire	
1998–2008	Henri Revol	Union pour un Mouvement Populaire	
2008–2014	Alain Houpert	Les Républicains	
2008–2014	François Patriat	La République En Marche	
2008–2014	François Rebsamen	Socialiste et apparentés	Until 2 May 2014 (named to cabinet)
2008–2014	Isabelle Lajoux	Socialiste et apparentés	From 3 May 2014 in place of François Rebsamen
2014–present	Alain Houpert	Les Républicains	
2014–present	Anne-Catherine Loisier	Union Centriste	
2014–present	François Patriat	La République En Marche	died in office 19 August 2026

== Sources ==
- Liste des anciens sénateurs de la IIIème République par circonscription (in French), Sénat de France
- Liste des anciens sénateurs de la IVème République par circonscription (in French), Sénat de France
- Liste des anciens sénateurs de la Vème République par circonscription (in French), Sénat de France
- Liste par département – Côte-d'Or (in French), Sénat de France
