= François Labrousse =

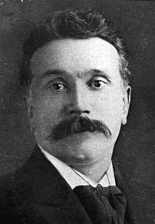
François Labrousse (1920s)

François Labrousse (29 December 1878, Brive-la-Gaillarde – 27 November 1951, Brive-la-Gaillarde) was a French politician and member of the Resistance.

== Biography ==
He was a doctor, specializing in psychiatry, and often served as an expert witness at the Court of Appeal of Paris. In 1921, he was elected a Senator for the Department of Corrèze; a position that was held by his father, Philippe-Michel Labrousse, from 1894 to 1910. Known for his oratorical skills, he was aligned with the Democratic Left, and was involved with most of that period's controversial issues; notably the Locarno Treaties and the Kellogg-Briand Pact.

At Vichy, in 1940, he helped to rally a group of veteran Senators, in their vain attempts to oppose the constitutional changes being made. His vote was one of the eighty cast against giving full powers to Marshal Pétain. As a result, he was placed under surveillance by the Vichy Régime. In 1941, while back in his hometown, the Régime accused him of holding a high position with the Freemasons. Shortly after, he resigned his office and joined the Resistance. Following the invasion of the zone libre by German troops, he became a special target for the Gestapo, forcing him, at the age of sixty-five, to join the Maquis.

In 1944, after the fall of the Vichy government, he was elected to the Provisional Consultative Assembly as a Deputy for Corrèze. He briefly served as its Vice-President. That same year, as an amateur artist, he was elected to the Académie des Beaux-Arts; taking Seat #5 in the "Unattached" section. As a member of the Democratic and Socialist Union of the Resistance, he represented the commune of Donzenac from 1945 until his death.
