= René-Pierre Signé =

French politician (1930–2026)

René-Pierre Signé (16 September 1930 – 12 October 2026) was a French politician who was a member of the Senate of France from 1986 to 2011, representing the Nièvre department. He was a member of the Socialist Party. Signé died on 12 October 2026, at the age of 96.

== Sources ==
- Page on the Senate website (in French)
