= List of senators of Lozère =

Location of Lozère in France

Following is a list of senators of Lozère, people who have represented the department of Lozère in the Senate of France.

== Third Republic ==
Senators for Lozère under the French Third Republic were:

- Anatole de Colombet de Landos (1876–1879)
- Joseph Dominique Aldebert de Chambrun (1876–1879)
- Thomas de Rozière (1879–1896) died in office
- Théophile Roussel (1879–1903) died in office
- Jean Monestier (1896–1906)
- Emmanuel de Las-Cases (1903–1933)
- Paulin Daudé-Gleize (1906–1928) died in office
- Joseph Bonnet de Paillerets (1928–1930) died in office
- Louis Bringer (1930–1941)
- Pierre de Chambrun (1933–1941)

== Fourth Republic ==
Senators for Lozère under the French Fourth Republic were:

- Charles Morel
- Georges Bonnet

== Fifth Republic ==
Senators for Lozère under the French Fifth Republic:

- Georges Bonnet (1959–1973) died in office
- Jules Roujon (1973–1985) died in office
- Joseph Caupert (1985–1994) died in office
- Janine Bardou (1994–2001)
- Jacques Blanc (2001–2011)
- Alain Bertrand (2011–present)

== Sources ==
- Liste des anciens sénateurs de la IIIème République par circonscription (in French), Sénat de France
- Liste des anciens sénateurs de la IVème République par circonscription (in French), Sénat de France
- Liste des anciens sénateurs de la Vème République par circonscription (in French), Sénat de France
- Liste par département – Lozère (in French), Sénat de France
