= Henri Maupoil =

French politician (1891–1971)

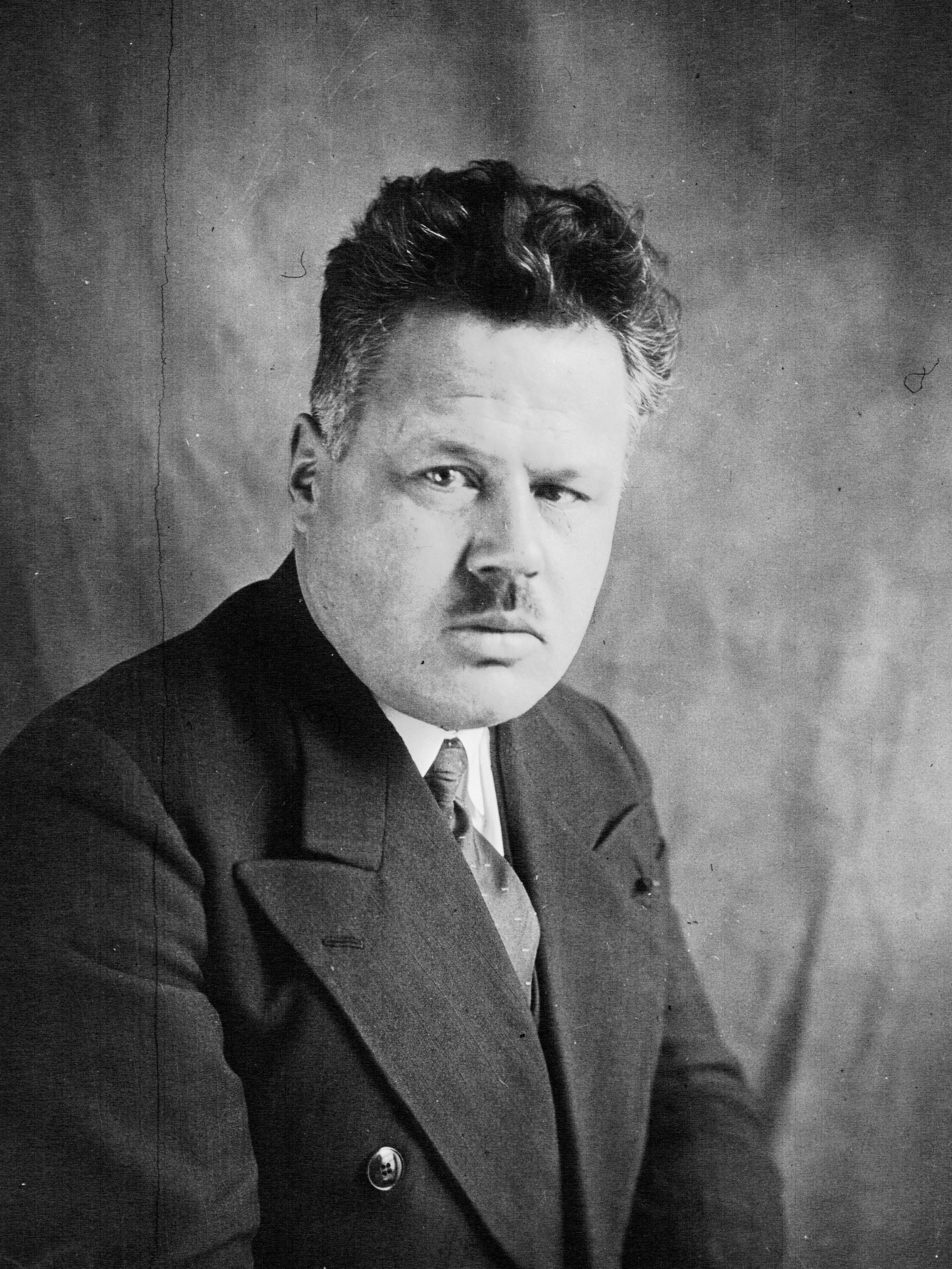
- Henri Maupoil in 1932
- Born: 11 July 1891; Dezize-lès-Maranges, Saône-et-Loire, France
- Died: 30 October 1971 (aged 80); Dezize-lès-Maranges, Saône-et-Loire, France
- Occupation: Politician

Henri Maupoil (11 July 1891 - 30 October 1971) was a French politician. He served as a member of the Chamber of Deputies from 1924 to 1936, and the French Senate from 1936 to 1944, representing Saône-et-Loire. He was also the Minister of Pensions from 7 June 1935 to 22 January 1936.

== Biography ==
Henri Maupoil fought in World War I alongside his father, a former Saint Cyr graduate who volunteered at the age of 55. He returned with the rank of captain but was disabled. His conduct earned him the Legion of Honor and the Military Medal with seven commendations.

In 1919, he returned to his native village, where he was elected mayor at the age of 28 and general councilor (in 1920) for the canton of Couches.

In the 1924 legislative elections, he was elected deputy on the Radical Party (France) list. In 1928, he was re-elected in the second round in the 1st constituency of Autun. In 1932, he was elected for a third term.

On July 10, 1940, he voted to grant full powers to Marshal Pétain. Denounced by the sub-prefect of Autun for his patriotic views, he was arrested on June 17, 1944, and deported to Theresienstadt Ghetto on July 15.

After the war, he resumed his political involvement. He was a senator until 1968 and a general councilor until 1964.
