= Jean-Paul Alduy =

French politician

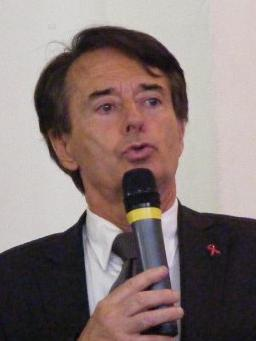
- Jean-Paul Alduy in 2009

Mayor of Perpignan
- In office 1993–2009
- Preceded by: Paul Alduy
- Succeeded by: Jean-Marc Pujol

Personal details
- Born: 7 May 1942 (age 84) Lyon, France
- Party: UDI
- Education: École Polytechnique; École des Ponts ParisTech

Jean-Paul Alduy (born 7 May 1942) is a French politician. He is member of the Senate of France, representing the department of Pyrénées-Orientales as well as the president of the Urban Community of Mediterranean Perpignan. An engineer by profession, he was a member of the Union for French Democracy and then the Union for a Popular Movement. His parents, Paul and Jacqueline Alduy, also served as senators of France.

== Youth and professional career ==
Alduy was born in Lyon. A polytechnic general engineer of National Road Training, he went through a large of his career in the Ivory Coast as the Director of the Central Office of Technical Studies from 1978 to 1980. He was the permanent secretary of building and technical policy of building management to the Ministry of Urban Development and Housing between 1981 and 1986. A year after leaving this post, he briefly became the Technical Adviser to Pierre Méhaignerie's cabinet between 1987 and 1988) then minister of Equipment, Housing and Transport. He then became Director General of Public Planning in Saint-Quentin-en-Yvelines from 1988 to 1993. In 1998 he finally became Engineer General of Roads.

== Senator and Mayor of Perpignan ==
Elected Adviser General of the Pyrénées-Orientales in 1992, he became Mayor of Perpignan without any competition in June 1993 after a partial election, succeeding his father who had occupied the post since 1959. Alduy was re-elected to the municipality in a four-way race in 1993 and subsequently a three-way race in 1995 and 2001.

After his failure in the legislative elections of 1993 and 1997, he was elected as senator of the Pyrénées-Orientales on the 23 September 2001. He then joined the UMP in 2002.

As the Vice President of the Radical Party of France, he gave his support to Nicolas Sarkozy who he welcomed to Perpignan for a meeting on the 23 February 2007 where he severely attacked the approach of François Bayrou.

== Municipal elections of 2008 ==
The 2008 election gave rise to heated debates, the opposition and several associations of Perpignan speaking out against the incumbent mayor's several projects, including construction of a theater by architect Jean Nouvel, and that of a new bridge over the Tet.

In the second round of voting, the list led by Alduy won with 45.5% of the vote, 574 votes ahead of the list of the Socialist Party, led by Jacqueline Amiel-Donat and a list of various left-leaning politicians and that of Jean Codognes Ripoull Clotilde, head of the Democratic Movement. During the counting of the second round, the president of the polling station No. 4 (out of 66) was caught in possession of ballot papers on behalf of John Paul Alduy hidden in his socks.

The exiting mayor was then re-elected by the new municipal council on 21 in a tense climate under the watchful eye of the national media.

The opposition challenged the legality of absentee and proxy votes, and formed a motion for annulment of the vote before the Administrative Court in Montpellier, to consider the procedure of the president of the polling station No. 4. For his part, Jean-Paul Alduy, convinced of the legality of the election, began a civil action.

In October 2008, based solely on incidents of Polling Station No. 4, the Administrative Court decided to invalidate the result. Jean-Paul Alduy appealed this decision to the Council of State. In a decision dated April 23, 2009, the Supreme Administrative Court rejected the appeal, confirming the decision of the lower court. The municipal election in Perpignan was officially cancelled and a new election was organized.

== Municipal by-election of 2009 and re-election ==
On 21, the "Perpignan at Heart" list led by Alduy in the new municipal elections was first in the first round of voting with 40.35% of the vote, beating the "left list"'s 24.75% and the former deputy Jean Codognes.

One week later, with the turnout increased to 51.08%, the UMP List won with 53.34% of the votes in a three-way race. He was re-elected by the new municipal council on 5 by 43 votes to 8, beating his Socialist opponent.

On this occasion, he announced that he would not be seeking a new mandate in the municipal elections of 2014. On the 17, Jean-Paul Alduy again became the president of the Urban Community of Mediterranean Perpignan with 87.5% of the vote

== Resignation ==
On the 15, Jean-Paul Alduy announced his resignation from the office of mayor of Perpignan, in order to become first deputy. Wishing to invest more in the urban community and anticipating the reform of local government, he ceded his seat to his first deputy, Jean-Marc Pujol.
