= List of senators of Tarn-et-Garonne =

Location of Tarn-et-Garonne in France

Following is a list of senators of Tarn-et-Garonne, people who have represented the department of Tarn-et-Garonne in the Senate of France.

== Third Republic ==
Senators for Tarn-et-Garonne under the French Third Republic were:

- André (Limairac) (1876)
- Paul (Preissac) (1876–1882)
- Isidore Delbreil (1876–1882)
- Henri Delbreil (1882–1891)
- Gustave Garrisson (1882–1897)
- Léon Rolland (1891–1912)
- Louis Bourgeat (1897–1902)
- Adrien Chabrié (1903–1909)
- Justin de Selves (1909–1927)
- Charles Caperan (1912–1920)
- Henri Pottevin (1920–1927)
- Auguste Puis (1927–1934)
- Roger Delthil (1927–1940)
- Léopold Presseq (1935–1940)

== Fourth Republic ==
Senators for Tarn-et-Garonne under the French Fourth Republic were:

- Frédéric Cayrou (1946–1958)
- Roger Delthil (1948–1951)
- Jean Lacaze (1952–1959)
- Adrien Laplace (1958–1959)

== Fifth Republic ==
Senators for Tarn-et-Garonne under the French Fifth Republic:

| In office | Name | Group | Notes |
|---|---|---|---|
| 1959–1975 | Jean Lacaze | Groupe de la Gauche Démocratique | Died in office 29 July 1975 |
| 1959–1977 | Adrien Laplace | Groupe de la Gauche Démocratique | |
| 1975–1984 | Pierre Tajan | Groupe de la Gauche Démocratique | Died in office 20 March 1984 |
| 1977–1978 | Marceau Hamecher | Groupe de la Gauche Démocratique | Died in office 27 August 1978 |
| 1978–1986 | André Jouany | Groupe de la Gauche Démocratique | Replaced Marceau Hamecher on 28 August 1978 |
| 1984–1995 | Jean Roger | Groupe du Rassemblement Démocratique et Européen | Replaced Pierre Tajan on 21 March 1984 |
| 1986–1988 | Jean-Michel Baylet | Groupe du Rassemblement Démocratique et Social Européen | Resigned 16 June 1988 (elected deputy) |
| 1988–present | Yvon Collin | Groupe du Rassemblement Démocratique et Social Européen | Elected 31 July 1988 |
| 1995–2014 | Jean-Michel Baylet | Groupe du Rassemblement Démocratique et Social Européen | |
| 2014–present | François Bonhomme | Groupe Les Républicains | |

== Sources ==
- Liste des anciens sénateurs de la IIIème République par circonscription (in French), Sénat de France
- Liste des anciens sénateurs de la IVème République par circonscription (in French), Sénat de France
- Liste des anciens sénateurs de la Vème République par circonscription (in French), Sénat de France
- Liste par département - Tarn-et-Garonne (in French), Sénat de France
