= Yves Krattinger =

French politician (born 1948)

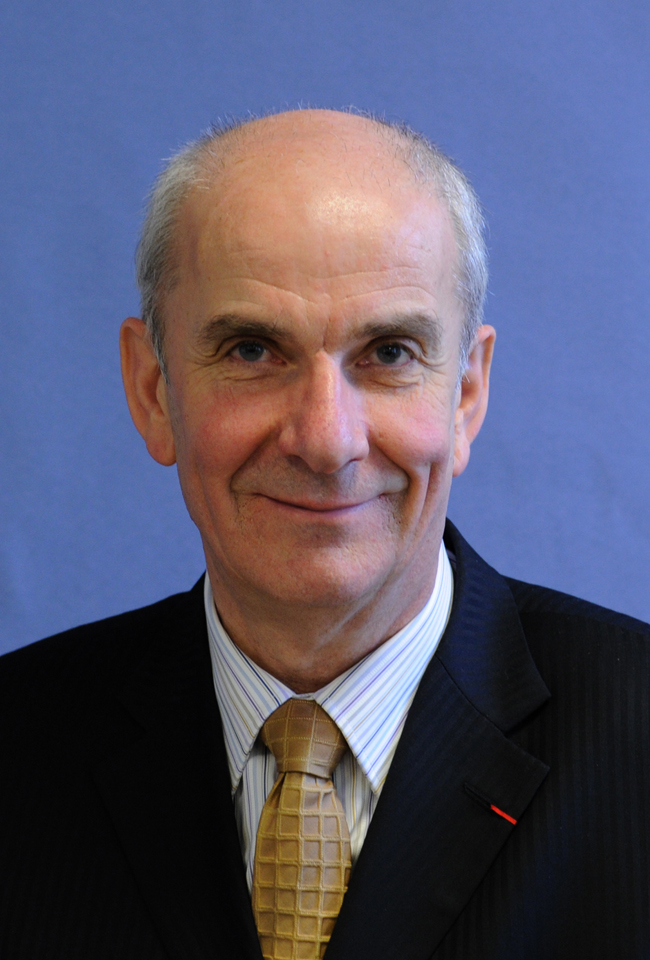
Yves Krattinger

Yves Krattinger (born 5 November 1948) was a member of the Senate of France, who represented the Haute-Saône department from 2003 to 2014. He is a member of the Socialist Party.

== Bibliography ==
- Page on the Senate website (in French)
