= Pierre Ramampy =

Malagasy politician

Pierre Ramampy (1897 – 1 March 1961) was a politician from Madagascar. Born in Vohitraveotra, Madagascar in 1897, he served in the French Senate from 1952–1958. Ramampy died on 1 March 1961, aged 63–64.
