= Dominique Leclerc =

French politician

Dominique Leclerc (French pronunciation: [dɔminik ləklɛʁ]; born 17 March 1944) is a French politician and a former member of the Senate of France from 1992 to 2011. He represented the Indre-et-Loire department and is a member of the Union for a Popular Movement Party.
