= List of senators of Meuse =

Location of Meuse in France

Following is a list of senators of Meuse, people who have represented the department of Meuse in the Senate of France.

== Third Republic ==
Senators for Meuse under the French Third Republic were:

- Henri Bompard (1876–1879)
- Charles Salmon (1876–1879)
- Auguste Vivenot (1879–1884)
- Auguste Honnore (1879–1886)
- Edmond Develle (1885–1909)
- Ernest Boulanger (1886–1907)
- Jean Buvignier (1894–1902)
- Raymond Poincaré (1903–1913 and 1920–1934)
- Charles Humbert (1908–1920)
- Jules Develle (1910–1919)
- Auguste Grosdidier (1913–1923)
- Pol Chevalier (1920–1935)
- Georges Lecourtier (1924–1940)
- Louis Courot (1935–1940)
- Arthur Mirouel (1935–1940)

== Fourth Republic ==
Senators for Meuse under the French Fourth Republic were:

- Maurice Rochette (1946–1948)
- Martial Brousse (1948–1959)
- François Schleiter (1948–1959)

== Fifth Republic ==
Former senators for Meuse under the French Fifth Republic were:

- François Schleiter (1959–1983)
- Martial Brousse (1959–1974)
- Rémi Herment (1974–2001)
- Michel Rufin (1983–2001)
- Gérard Longuet (2001–2011)
- Claude Biwer (2001–2011)
- Christian Namy (2011–2017)

As of January 2018 the senators were:

- Gérard Longuet from 2011
- Franck Menonville from 2017

== Sources ==
- Liste des anciens sénateurs de la IIIème République par circonscription (in French), Sénat de France
- Liste des anciens sénateurs de la IVème République par circonscription (in French), Sénat de France
- Liste des anciens sénateurs de la Vème République par circonscription (in French), Sénat de France
- Liste par département - Meuse (in French), Sénat de France
