= Jean-Pierre Vial =

French politician (born 1951)

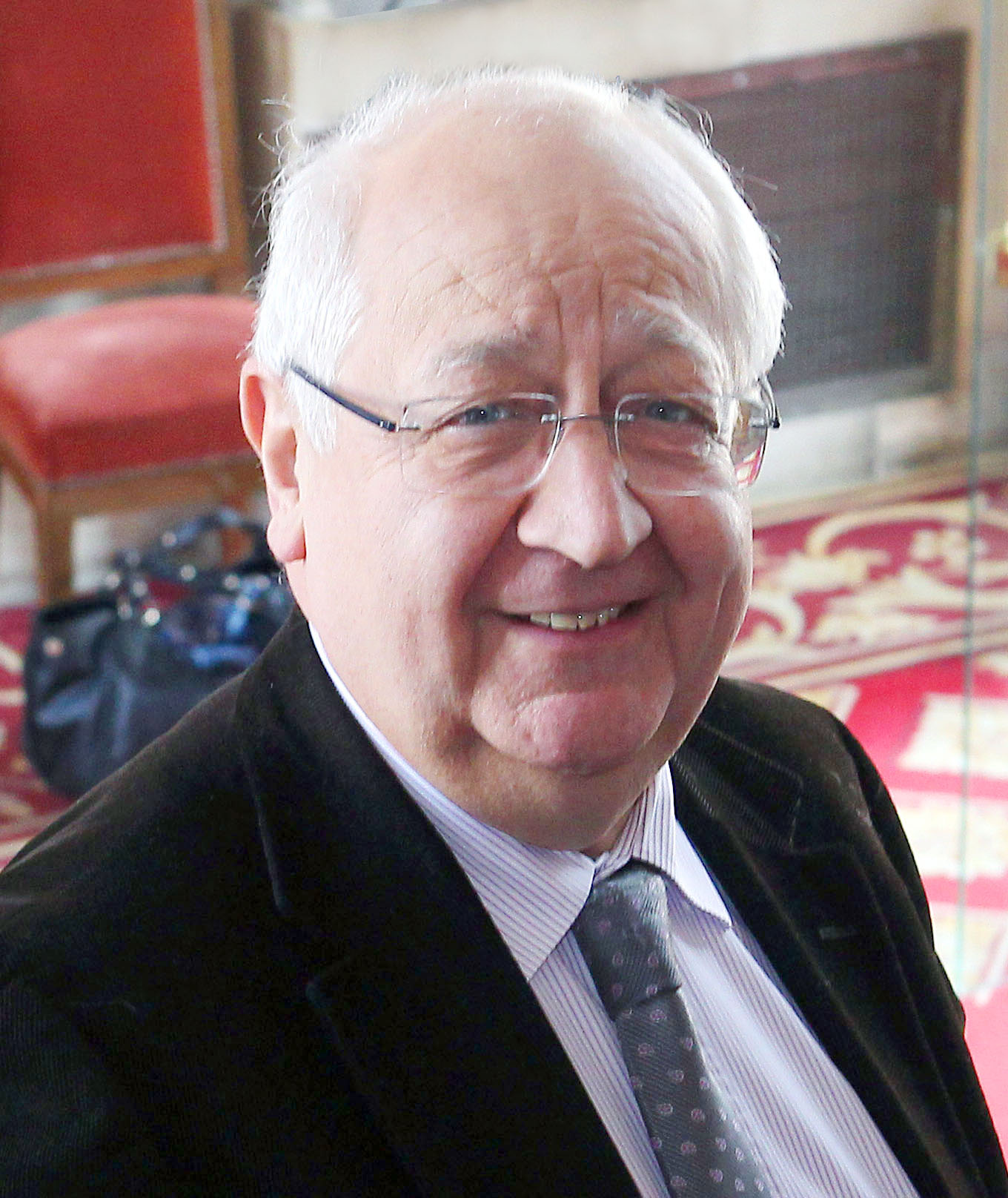
Jean-Pierre Vial

Jean Pierre Vial (born 17 February 1951) is a former member of the Senate of France, representing the Savoie department. He is a member of the Union for a Popular Movement.
