= Pierre Kotouo =

Cameroonian politician

- Born: 12 May 1916
- Died: 10 February 1993 (aged 76)
- Citizenship: Cameroon
- Occupation: Politician
- Title: Senator
- Political party: African Rally and Federalist Party

Pierre Kotouo (12 May 1916 in Goufan-Kiki, Cameroon – and died on 10 February 1993 in Yaoundé) was a Cameroonian politician who served in the French Senate from 1955 to 1958.

== Career ==
Pierre Kotouo was a principal administrative assistant in the civil and financial services of Cameroon in 1952, and he remained a member until 1956. This marked the beginning of his political career, which continued in the Council of the Republic, where he was elected on 19 June 1955. As a senator, Pierre Kotouo served as the intermediary responsible for presenting to the French government the demands of his compatriots at a time when the decolonization movement was in full swing. He joined the “Overseas Independents – African Democratic Rally” group, which he left in June 1958 to form, with eight other senators, the “African Rally and Federalist Party” group chaired by Emile-Derlin Zinsou.
