= Robert Gravier =

French politician

- Born: 5 September 1905; Haudonville, Meurthe-et-Moselle, France
- Died: 15 July 2005 (aged 99); Haudonville, Meurthe-et-Moselle, France
- Occupation: Politician

Robert Gravier (5 September 1905 - 15 July 2005) was a French politician. He served as a member of the French Senate from 1946 to 1974, where he represented Meurthe-et-Moselle.
