= List of senators of Loir-et-Cher =

Location of Loir-et-Cher in France

Following is a list of senators of Loir-et-Cher, people who have represented the department of Loir-et-Cher in the Senate of France.

== Third Republic ==
Senators for Loir-et-Cher under the French Third Republic were:

- Juste Frédéric Riffault (1876–1879)
- Jean Bozérian (1876–1893)
- Jean-François-Charles Dufay (1879–1897)
- Édouard Ernest Prillieux (1897–1906)
- Pierre Tassin (1893–1906)
- Henri David (1906–1914) died in office
- Henri David (1906–1914)
- Eusèbe Gauvin (1906–1931)
- Pierre Berger (1920–1932)
- Pierre Pichery (1920–1940)
- Édouard Boudin (1933–1934)
- Camille Chautemps (1934–1941)
- Joseph Paul-Boncour (1931–1940)

== Fourth Republic ==
Senators for Loir-et-Cher under the French Fourth Republic were:

- Jacques Boisrond (1946–1959)
- Robert Le Guyon (1948–1955)
- Joseph Beaujannot (1955–1959)

== Fifth Republic ==
Senators for Loir-et-Cher under the French Fifth Republic:

| In office | Name | Group | |
|---|---|---|---|
| 1959–1974 | Joseph Beaujannot | Républicains et Indépendants | |
| 1959–1961 | Jacques Boisrond | Républicains et Indépendants | Died in office 3 October 1961 |
| 1961–1974 | Robert Bruyneel | Républicains et Indépendants | From 4 October 1961 in place of Jacques Boisrond |
| 1974–1986 | Charles Beaupetit | Gauche Démocratique | Died in office 9 September 1986 |
| 1974–1992 | Jacques Thyraud | Union des Républicains et des Indépendants | |
| 1986–2001 | Jacques Bimbenet | Rassemblement Démocratique et Social Européen | From 10 September 1986 in place of Charles Beaupetit |
| 1992–2011 | Pierre Fauchon | Union centriste | |
| 2001–2011 | Jacqueline Gourault | Union centriste | Until 21 July 2011 (named to cabinet) |
| 2011–2017 | Jeanny Lorgeoux | Socialiste et républicain | |
| 2017 | Jacqueline Gourault | Union centriste | Until 2 November 2017 (named to cabinet) |
| 2017–present | Jean-Marie Janssens | Union centriste | |
| 2017–present | Jean-Paul Prince | Union Centriste | From 3 November 2017 in place of Jacqueline Gourault |

== Sources ==
- Liste des anciens sénateurs de la IIIème République par circonscription (in French), Sénat de France
- Liste des anciens sénateurs de la IVème République par circonscription (in French), Sénat de France
- Liste des anciens sénateurs de la Vème République par circonscription (in French), Sénat de France
- Liste par département – Loir-et-Cher (in French), Sénat de France
