= List of senators of Haute-Marne =

Location of Haute-Marne in France

Following is a list of senators of Haute-Marne, people who have represented the department of Haute-Marne in the Senate of France.

== Third Republic ==
Senators for Haute-Marne under the French Third Republic were:

- Louis Robert-Dehault (1876–1881)
- Félix Pélissier (1876–1887)
- Alexandre Donnot (1882–1886)
- Jean Danelle-Bernardin (1887–1916)
- Jean Darbot (1888–1920)
- Pierre Bizot de Fonteny (1888–1908)
- Léon Mougeot (1908–1920)
- Arthur Maranguet (1920–1924)
- Georges Quilliard (1920–1924)
- Émile Humblot (1920–1931)
- Joseph Courtier (1924–1933)
- Émile Cassez (1924–1940)
- Georges Ulmo (1932–1940)
- Raymond Martin (1933–1940)

== Fourth Republic ==
Senators for Haute-Marne under the French Fourth Republic were:

- Georges Maire (1946–1955)
- Charles Barret (1948–1954)
- Edgard Pisani (1954–1959)
- Pierre Mathey (1955–1959)

== Fifth Republic ==
Senators for Haute-Marne under the French Fifth Republic were:

- Edgard Pisani (1959–1961) and (1974–1981)
- Pierre Mathey (1959–1972)
- Raymond Boin (1961–1974)
- René Rollin (1972–1974)
- Georges Berchet (1974–2001)
- Jacques-Richard Delong (1981–2001)

As of January 2018 the senators were:

- Charles Guené – Union for a Popular Movement (UMP) then The Republicans (LR) from 2001
- Bruno Sido – Union for a Popular Movement (UMP) then The Republicans (LR) from 2001

== Sources ==
- Liste des anciens sénateurs de la IIIème République par circonscription (in French), Sénat de France
- Liste des anciens sénateurs de la IVème République par circonscription (in French), Sénat de France
- Liste des anciens sénateurs de la Vème République par circonscription (in French), Sénat de France
- Liste par département - Haute-Marne (in French), Sénat de France
