= List of senators of Aube =

Location of Aube in France

Following is a list of senators of Aube, people who have represented the department of Aube in the Senate of France.

== Third Republic ==
Senators for Aube under the French Third Republic were:

- Amédée Gayot (1876–1880)
- Jean Masson de Mortefontaine (1876–1885)
- Émile Gayot (1880–1909)
- Antoine Tezenas (1885–1896)
- Eugène Rambourgt (1896–1914)
- Alphonse Renaudat (1897–1930)
- Henri Castillard (1909–1927)
- Louis Mony (1920–1926)
- Alexandre Israël (1927–1937)
- Raymond Armbruster (1927–1945)
- Victor Lesaché (1930–1938)
- René Converset (1937–1945)
- Fernand Monsacré (1939–1944)

== Fourth Republic ==
Senators for Aube under the French Fourth Republic were:

- Gustave Alric (1946–1959)
- François Patenôtre (1948–1959)

== Fifth Republic ==
Senators for Aube under the French Fifth Republic:

Name	In office	Group or party	Notes
Gustave Alric	1959–1967	Républicains et Indépendants	Died 17 October 1967
François Patenôtre	1959–1971	Républicains et Indépendant	
Henri Terré	1968–1978	Union des Républicains et des Indépendants	Died in office 13 October 1978
Pierre Labonde	1971–1981	Républicains et Indépendants	Died 22 November 1981
Jean David	1978–1980	Union Centriste des Démocrates de Progrès	Replaced Henri Terré on 14 November 1978
Robert Galley	1980	Rassemblement pour la République	Joined the cabinet 1 November 1980
Henri Portier	1980–1989	Rassemblement pour la République	Replaced Robert Galley on 2 November 1980
Bernard Laurent	1981–1994	Union Centriste	Replaced Pierre Labonde on 23 November 1981; Died in office 15 July 1994
Philippe Adnot	from 1989	Mouvement libéral et modéré	
Yann Gaillard	1994–2014	Union pour un Mouvement Populaire	Replaced Bernard Laurent on 16 July 1994
François Baroin	2014–2017	The Republicans (LR)	Resigned 30 September 2017
Évelyne Perrot	From 2017	none	Elected 17 December 2017

== Sources ==
- Liste des anciens sénateurs de la IIIème République par circonscription (in French), Sénat de France
- Liste des anciens sénateurs de la IVème République par circonscription (in French), Sénat de France
- Liste des anciens sénateurs de la Vème République par circonscription (in French), Sénat de France
- Liste par département - Aube (in French), Sénat de France
