= Christiane Longère =

French politician

Christiane Longère (born 11 April 1953) is a French politician. She represented the department of Loire in the French Senate as a Union for a Popular Movement member from 17 April 2010 to 30 September 2011.

Longère was elected to the Senate in a 2010 by-election to replace Michel Thiollière. She was defeated when she ran for reelection in 2011. She has served as mayor of Briennon since 1997.
