= Gustave Denis =

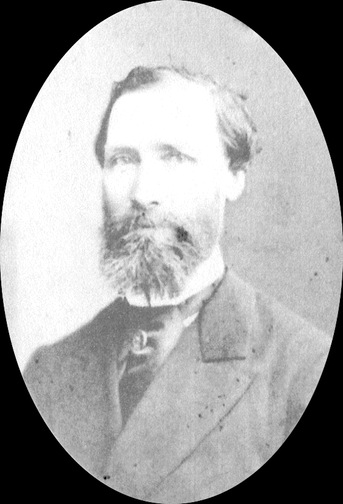

Gustave Denis (20 August 1833, Saint-Georges-Buttavent – 2 February 1925) was a French industrialist and politician.
