= List of senators of Orne =

Location of Orne in France

Following is a list of senators of Orne, people who have represented the department of Orne in the Senate of France.

== Third Republic ==
Senators for Orne under the French Third Republic were:

- Alfred de Flers (1876–1883)
- Léon de La Sicotière (1876–1895)
- Charles Poriquet (1876–1910)
- Marcel Libert (1885–1892)
- Léon Labbé (1892–1916)
- Paul Fleury (1895–1931)
- Louis Cachet (1910–1914)
- Robert Leneveu (1920–1927)
- Alfred Oriot (1920–1927)
- Georges Dentu (1927–1940)
- Alexandre Millerand (1927–1940)
- René de Ludre-Frolois (1931–1940)

== Fourth Republic ==
Senators for Orne under the French Fourth Republic were:

- Raymond Le Terrier (1946–1948)
- Étienne Le Sassier Boisauné (1946–1948 et de 1952–1959)
- Pierre Couinaud (1948–1951)
- Marcel Hébert (1948–1952)
- Gaston Meillon (1951–1952) and (1956–1959)
- René Laniel (1952–1956)

== Fifth Republic ==
Senators for Orne under the French Fifth Republic were:

- Paul Pelleray (1959–1974)
- Étienne Le Sassier Boisauné (1959–1965)
- Hubert d'Andigné (1965–1992)
- Henri Olivier (1974–1992)
- Daniel Goulet (1992–2007)
- Alain Lambert (1992–2002 et de 2004–2010)
- Brigitte Luypaert (2002–2004)
- Jean-Claude Lenoir (2011–2017)

As of January 2018 the senators were:

Name	Took office	Group	Notes
Nathalie Goulet	2011	Centrist Union group (UC)	
Sébastien Leroux	2017	The Republicans group (LR)	

== Sources ==
- Liste des anciens sénateurs de la IIIème République par circonscription (in French), Sénat de France
- Liste des anciens sénateurs de la IVème République par circonscription (in French), Sénat de France
- Liste des anciens sénateurs de la Vème République par circonscription (in French), Sénat de France
- Liste par département - Orne (in French), Sénat de France
