= Maurice Pic (politician) =

French politician (1913–1991)

Maurice Pic was a French politician. Pic was born on 15 February 1913 in Saint-Christol, Vaucluse and died on 13 January 1991 in Montélimar, Drôme Department.
