= Jacqueline Alduy =

French politician (1924–2016)

French Parliament Senator
- In office 23 October 1982 – 2 October 1983

Personal details
- Born: Jacqueline Triaire; 20 March 1924 Hanoi (Tonkin Protectorate)
- Died: 15 March 2016 (aged 91) Amélie-les-Bains-Palalda
- Spouse: Paul Alduy
- Children: Jean-Paul Alduy

Jacqueline Alduy (20 March 1924 – 15 March 2016) was a French politician. She was the mayor of Amélie-les-Bains-Palalda for 42 years, from 1959 to March 2001. She was the mother of Jean-Paul Alduy, mayor of Perpignan, and the wife of Paul Alduy, who was also mayor of Perpignan from 1959 to 1993.

== Roles in the Senate ==
- Senator for Pyrénées-Orientales (1982–1983)
- Member of the commission for cultural affairs

== Earlier roles ==
- General Council of Pyrénées-Orientales (1967–2001)
- Mayor of Amélie-les-Bains from 1959 to 2001
