= Michel Thiollière =

French politician

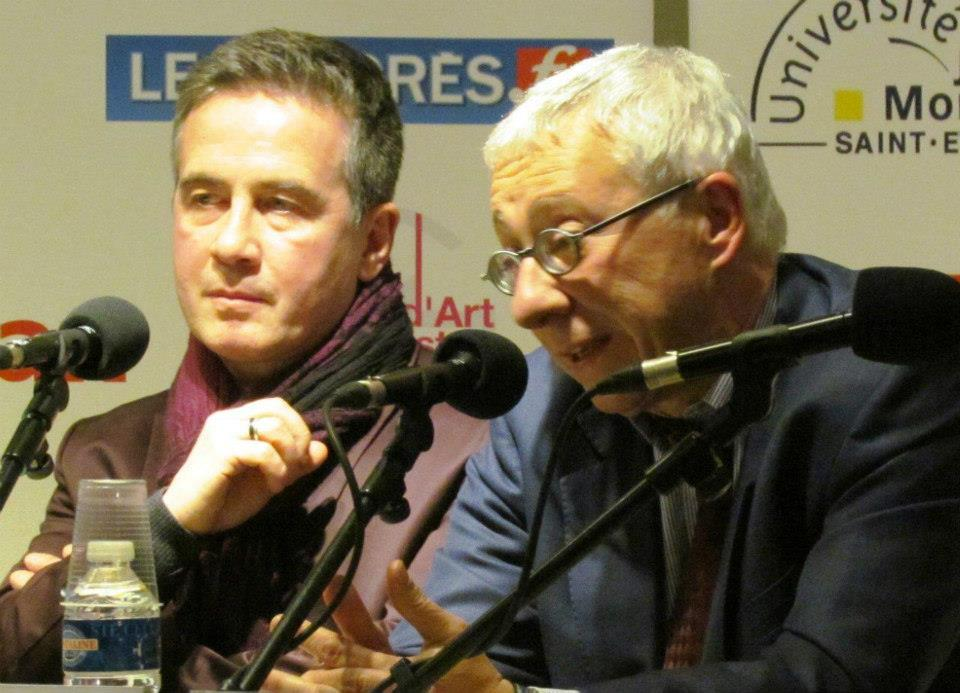
- Christian Soleil and Michel Thiollière on Radio Fourvière, 2012

Mayor of Saint-Étienne
- In office 1994–2008
- Preceded by: François Dubanchet
- Succeeded by: Maurice Vincent

Member of the French Senate for Loire
- In office 2001–2010
- Succeeded by: Christiane Longère

Personal details
- Born: 10 April 1955 (age 70) Saint-Étienne, France
- Party: Radical Party
- Profession: Teacher

Michel Thiollière (born 10 April 1955 in Saint-Étienne, Loire) is a French politician, senator for the Loire since 2001. He was the Mayor of Saint-Étienne from 1994 to 2008. He is a member of the Radical Party.

In 2006, he was one of the finalists for World Mayor.
