= List of senators of Mayotte =

Location of Mayotte in France

Following is a list of senators of Mayotte, people who have represented the overseas department of Mayotte in the Senate of France.

== Fifth Republic ==
Senators for Mayotte under the French Fifth Republic were:

In office	Name	Party or group	Notes
1977–2004	Marcel Henry	Centrist Union group (UC)	
2004–2011	Soibahadine Ibrahim Ramadani	Union for a Popular Movement (UMP)	
2004–2011	Adrien Giraud	Union for French Democracy (UDF)	
2011–2017	Thani Mohamed Soilihi	Miscellaneous left (DVG)	
2011–2017	Abdourahamane Soilihi	Union for a Popular Movement (UMP)	
From 2017	Abdallah Hassani	La République En Marche! (REM)	
From 2017	Thani Mohamed Soilihi	La République En Marche! (REM)	

== Sources ==
- Liste des anciens sénateurs de la Vème République par circonscription (in French), Sénat de France
- Liste par département - Mayotte (in French), Sénat de France
