= Joël Billard =

French politician (born 1953)

Joël Billard (born 21 March 1953) is a former member of the Senate of France, who represented the Eure-et-Loir department from 2001 to 2014. He is a member of the Union for a Popular Movement.
