= Josiane Mathon-Poinat =

French politician

- In office 23 September 2001 – 30 September 2011

Personal details
- Born: August 23, 1954 (age 71)
- Party: Parti communiste français
- Known for: Politics

Josiane Mathon-Poinat (born 23 August 1954 in La Ricamarie, Loire) is a member of the Senate of France, representing the Loire department. She is a member of the French Communist Party, and of the Communist, Republican, and Citizen Group. Mathon-Poinat was first elected to the Senate on September 3, 2001.

== Biography ==
Mathon-Poinat was originally a secretary, before being elected to the municipal council of La Ricamarie and becoming the first deputy mayor in 2001.

Mathon-Poinat was registered in the Communist Group, as a republican and a citizen and Senators of the Left Party (CRC-GSP). She is a member of the Committee on Constitutional laws, legislation, universal suffrage, regulations, and general administration of the Senate. She is a member of the Delegation for Women's Rights and Equal Opportunities between men and women, and is also a member of the Steering Board of the administrative simplification.

Her term ended on 30 September 2011.

== Bibliography ==
- Page on the Senate website
