= Jean-Paul Amoudry =

French politician

- Born: 30 March 1950 (age 76); Serraval, France
- Political party: The Centrists

Jean-Paul Amoudry (born 30 March 1950) is a former member of the Senate of France, representing the Haute-Savoie department from 1995 to 2014. He is a member of The Centrists.

== Biography ==
A local government official by training, he was elected senator for Haute-Savoie on September 24, 1995, and re-elected on September 26, 2004.

He is a member of the hunting and fishing group, the study group on mountain economic development, and the study group on tourism and leisure. He is also president of SYANE (Syndicat des énergies et de l'Aménagement Numérique de la Haute-Savoie, or Union for Energy and Digital Development in Haute-Savoie).

== Bibliography ==
- Page on the Senate website (in French)
