= Georges Ginoux =

French politician (1933–2022)

Member of the French Senate
- In office 1 May 2004 – 30 June 2005
- Constituency: Cher

Mayor of Presly
- In office 1995–2014
- Succeeded by: Sylvie Giboint

Personal details
- Born: 8 November 1933 Antwerp, Belgium
- Died: 10 March 2022 (aged 88) Presly, France
- Party: UMP

Georges Ginoux (8 November 1933 – 10 March 2022) was a Belgian-born French politician. A member of the Union for a Popular Movement, he served in the Senate from 2004 to 2005. He died in Presly on 10 March 2022, at the age of 88.
