= Serge Vinçon =

French politician (1949 – 2007)

- Born: 17 June 1949; Bourges, Cher, France
- Died: 16 December 2007 (aged 58)
- Occupation: French Politician

Serge Vinçon (17 June 1949 – 16 December 2007), was a French politician of the UMP party.

== Career ==
Born in Bourges, Cher, he was a college professor before he became a politician. He was elected senator of Cher on 24 September 1989 and re-elected on 27 September 1998. During this time, he was also a substitute for France in the European Parliament, from 1993 to 1998. He was chairman of the Committee on Defense and Foreign Affairs from 2004 until his death and also held the position of mayor of Saint-Amand-Montrond from 1983 until his death. His most notable position was the Vice-President of the Senate from 2001 to 2004.

== Death ==
Vinçon died of a brain tumor on 16 December 2007 at the hospital of Val de Grâce in Paris. Nicolas Sarkozy paid tribute to him in a statement, referring to a "man of letters" and "a brilliant observer of the geopolitical developments of our time" who "will be remembered as a senator who embodies all the qualities of dialogue and compromise that House requires."
