= Nicolas Alfonsi =

French politician (1936–2020)

Senate of France
- In office 2 December 2001 – 30 September 2014
- Preceded by: Louis-Ferdinand de Rocca Serra
- Succeeded by: Jean-Jacques Panunzi
- Constituency: Corse-du-Sud

Member of the European Parliament
- In office 1 September 1981 – 23 July 1984

Deputy of National Assembly
- In office 2 July 1981 – 14 May 1988
- Constituency: Corse-du-Sud

Deputy of National Assembly
- In office 2 April 1973 – 2 April 1978
- Constituency: 1st of Corsica

Member of the Departmental Council of Corse-du-Sud
- In office 1 January 1962 – 29 March 2015
- Constituency: Canton des Deux-Sevi

Mayor of Piana, Corsica
- In office 1 January 1962 – 18 March 2001
- Preceded by: Jean Alfonsi
- Succeeded by: Pascaline Castellani

Personal details
- Born: 13 April 1936 Cargèse, Corsica, France
- Died: 16 March 2020 (aged 83) Ajaccio, Corsica, France
- Cause of death: COVID-19
- Party: Radical Party of the Left

Nicolas Alfonsi (13 April 1936 – 16 March 2020) was a French politician, member of the Senate of France, representing the department of Corse-du-Sud.

== Biography ==
He was born in Cargèse, Corsica. He was a member of the Radical Party of the Left, and was by profession a lawyer.

He was re-elected on September 21, 2008, in the first round. In this capacity, he served as Vice-President of the Senate's Committee on Laws from 2008 to 2014.

He also served as interim President of the Assembly of Corsica in 1998, following health issues faced by Jean-Paul de Rocca Serra.

He did not run for re-election in the 2014 senatorial elections in September.

He was married and was the father of three children.

Alfonsi died on 16 March 2020, of COVID-19.

== Honor ==
- Knight of Legion of Honour (2015)
