= Elections in Franche-Comté =

This page gathers the results of elections in Franche-Comté.

== Regional elections ==
=== 2004 regional election ===
In the regional election which took place on March 21 and March 28, 2004, Raymond Forni (PS) was elected President, defeating incumbent Jean-François Humbert (UMP).

Franche-Comté regional election, 2004
Party	Candidate	Votes	%	±%
PS	Raymond Forni	146,553	31.28	
UMP	Jean-François Humbert	116,354	24.84	
FN	Sophie Montel	87,498	18.68	
UDF	Gerard Faivre	36,029	7.69	
MEI	Jacques Lancon	26,477	5.65	
LO	Christian Driano	22,059	4.71	
PCF	Evelyne Ternant	19,577	4.18	
MNR	Marie France Ligney	6,914	1.48	
Other	Hervée de Lafond	5,884	1.26	
Other	Jean-Philippe Allenbach	1,154	0.25	
Majority		249,882		
Turnout		499,764		
PS	Raymond Forni	240,551	46.79	
UMP	Jean-François Humbert	185,761	36.13	
FN	Sophie Montel	87,766	17.07	
Majority		268,941		
Turnout		537,881		
PS gain from UMP		Swing	10.66	
