= Alain Fousseret =

French politician (1956–2022)

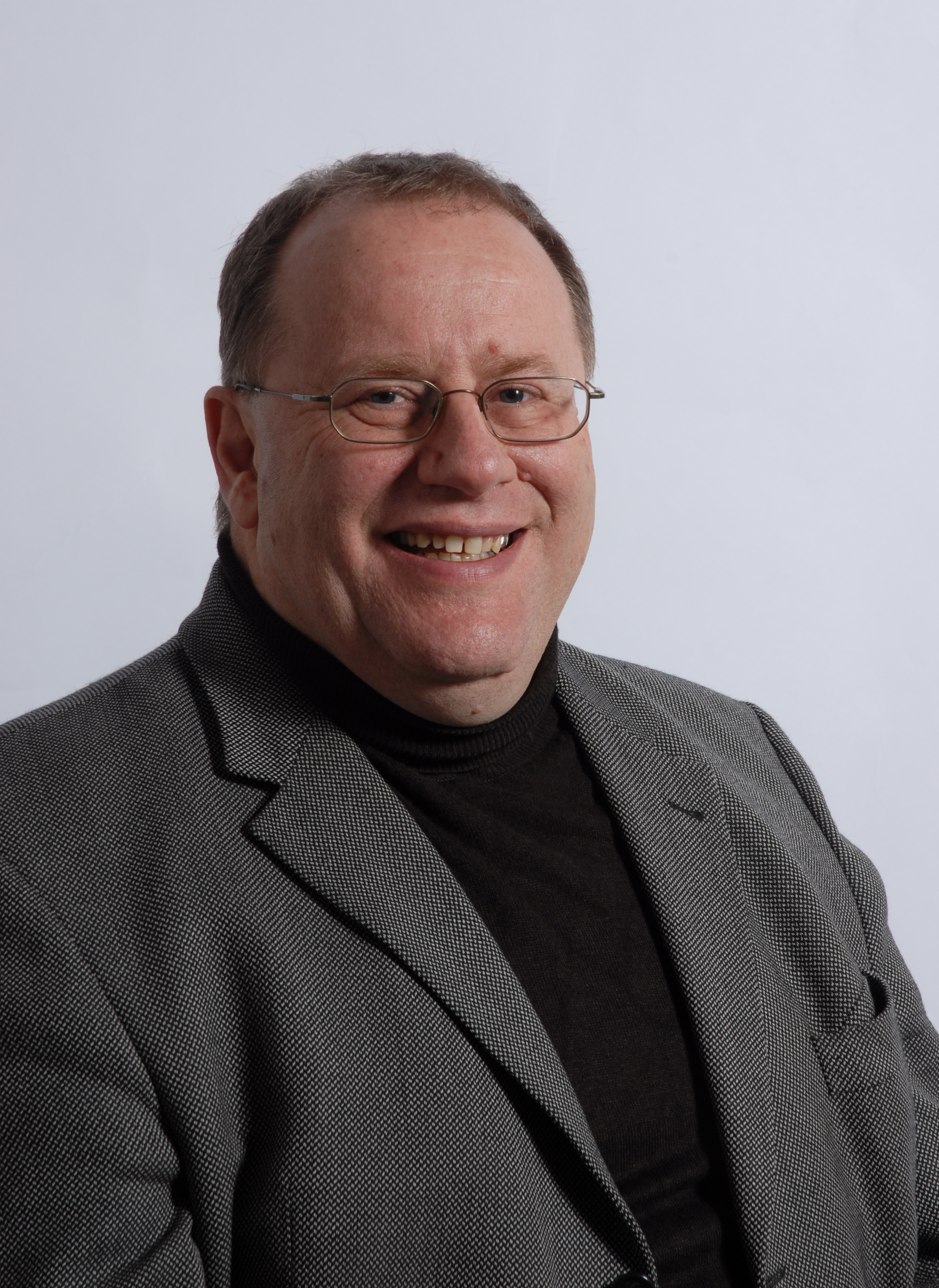

Third Vice President of Franche-Comté Regional Council
- In office 2 April 2004 – 6 December 2022
- President: Marie-Marguerite Dufay; Raymond Forni

Regional Councillor from Territoire de Belfort
- In office 1998 – 6 December 2022

Personal details
- Born: 25 March 1956 Besançon, France
- Died: 6 December 2022 (aged 66) Danjoutin, Territoire de Belfort, France
- Party: The Greens
- Relatives: Jean-Louis Fousseret (brother)

Alain Fousseret (25 March 1956 – 6 December 2022) was a French politician and one of ten vice presidents of the Franche-Comté Regional Council. He won the nomination to be the next Greens and Europe Écologie candidate for President of Franche-Comté in 2010.

Alain Fousseret was the brother of Jean-Louis Fousseret, the former Socialist mayor of Besançon. He died on 6 December 2022, at the age of 66.

== Sources ==
- Franche-Comté Regional Council : La Présidente et son Bureau (in French)

Party political offices
Preceded by Raymond Forni	Green Party nominee for President of Franche Comté; 2010	Succeeded by current nominee
Preceded by coalition founded recently	Europe Ecology - The Greens nominee for President of Franche Comté; 2010	Succeeded by current nominee
