= Jean-Paul Anciaux =

French politician

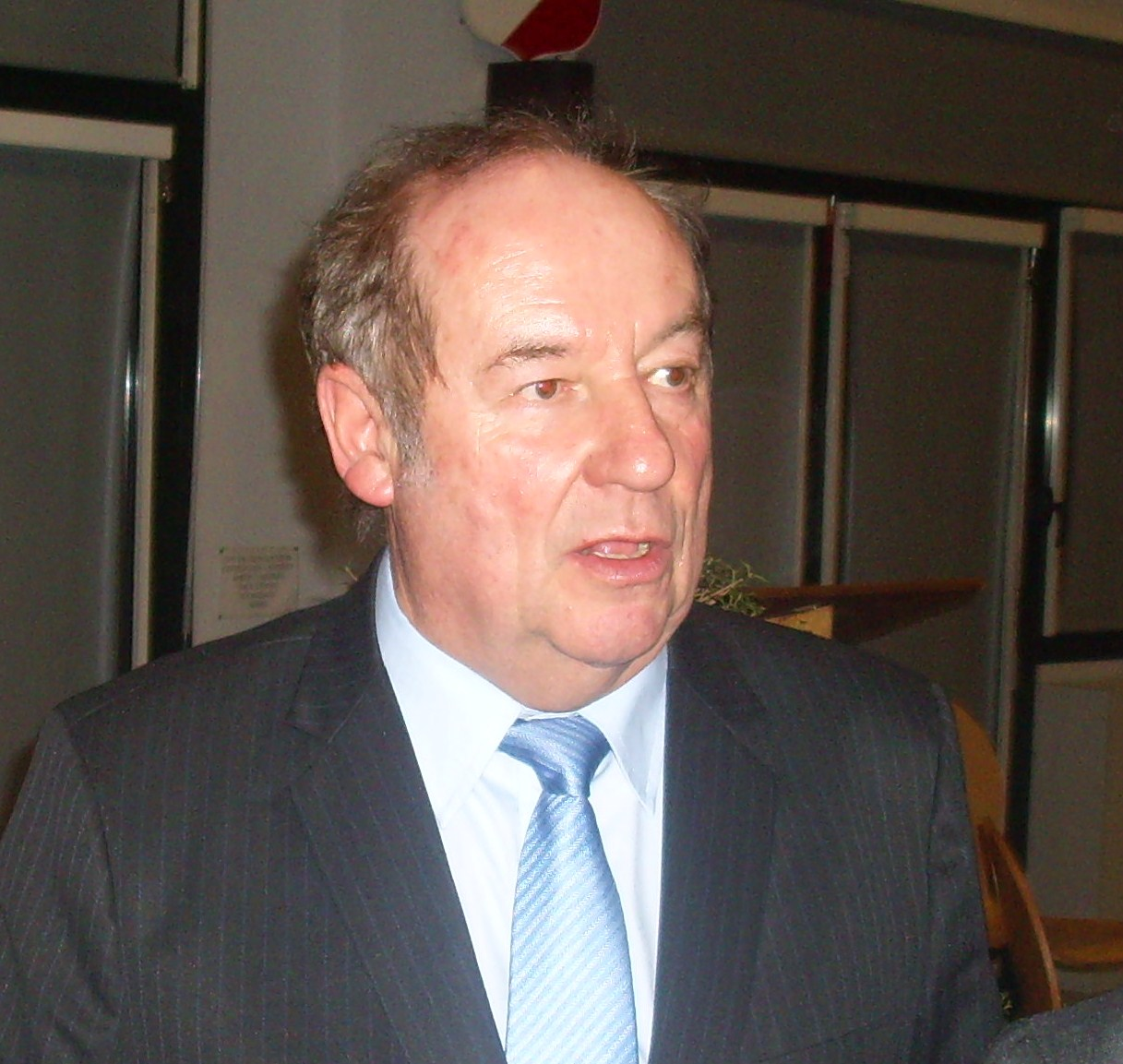

Member of the National Assembly of France for Saône-et-Loire's 3rd constituency
- In office 2002–2012
- Preceded by: André Billardon
- Succeeded by: Philippe Baumel
- In office 2 April 1993 – 21 April 1997
- Preceded by: André Billardon
- Succeeded by: André Billardon

General councillor of Bourgogne
- Incumbent
- Assumed office 1986

Municipal councillor of Autun
- Incumbent
- Assumed office 20 March 1989

Municipal councillor of Broye
- In office 1977–1983

Personal details
- Born: 17 July 1946 (age 79) Le Creusot, Saône-et-Loire France
- Party: Union for a Popular Movement
- Committees: Economic, Environmental and Regional Planning Committee
- Website: Site

Jean-Paul Anciaux (born 17 July 1946) was a member of the National Assembly of France. He represented Saône-et-Loire's 3rd constituency and is a member of the Union for a Popular Movement.
