= Sylvie Vermeillet =

French politician

President of UMP-NC-DVD Group in the Franche-Comté Regional Council De facto Leader of Opposition
- Incumbent
- Assumed office 9 July 2010
- Preceded by: Alain Joyandet

President of UMP Group in the Franche-Comté Regional Council De facto Leader of Opposition
- In office 24 October 2009 – 25 March 2010
- Preceded by: Jean-François Humbert
- Succeeded by: Alain Joyandet

Personal details
- Party: Union for a Popular Movement

Sylvie Vermeillet (French pronunciation: [silvi vɛʁmɛjɛ]) is a French politician and a member of the Franche-Comté Regional Council. She represents the Jura department and is a member of the Union for a Popular Movement Party.

== Opposition leader in Franche-Comté regional council ==
On 24 October 2009 she replaced Jean-François Humbert as Leader of UMP Group in Regional Council. After the regional elections, Joyandet succeeded him as head of the opposition group.

On 9 July 2010 Alain Joyandet left the regional council; Vermeillet succeeded him again.
