= Bourgogne-Franche-Comté =

Administrative region of France

Bourgogne-Franche-Comté Borgogne-Franche-Comtât (Arpitan)
- Region
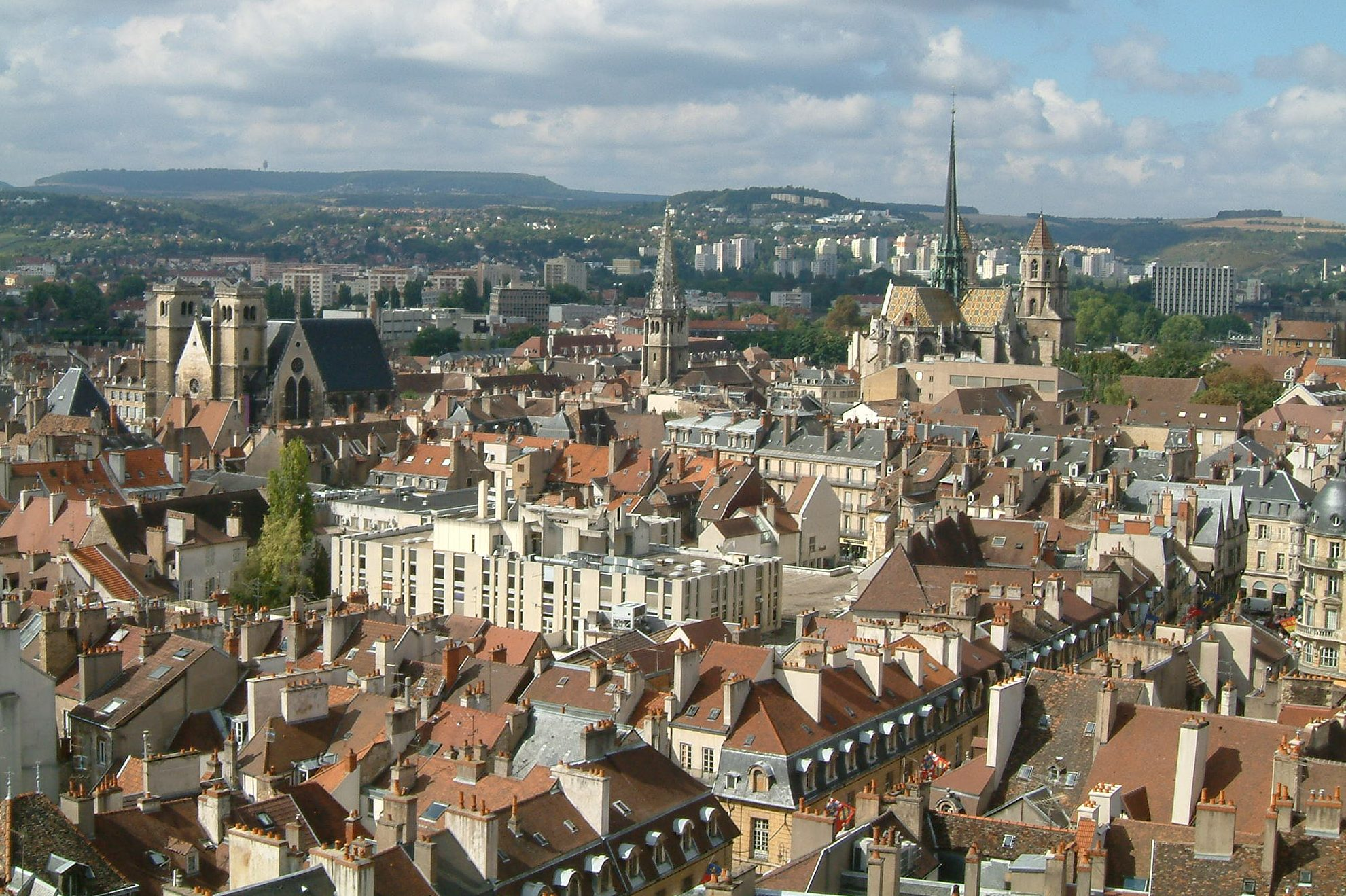
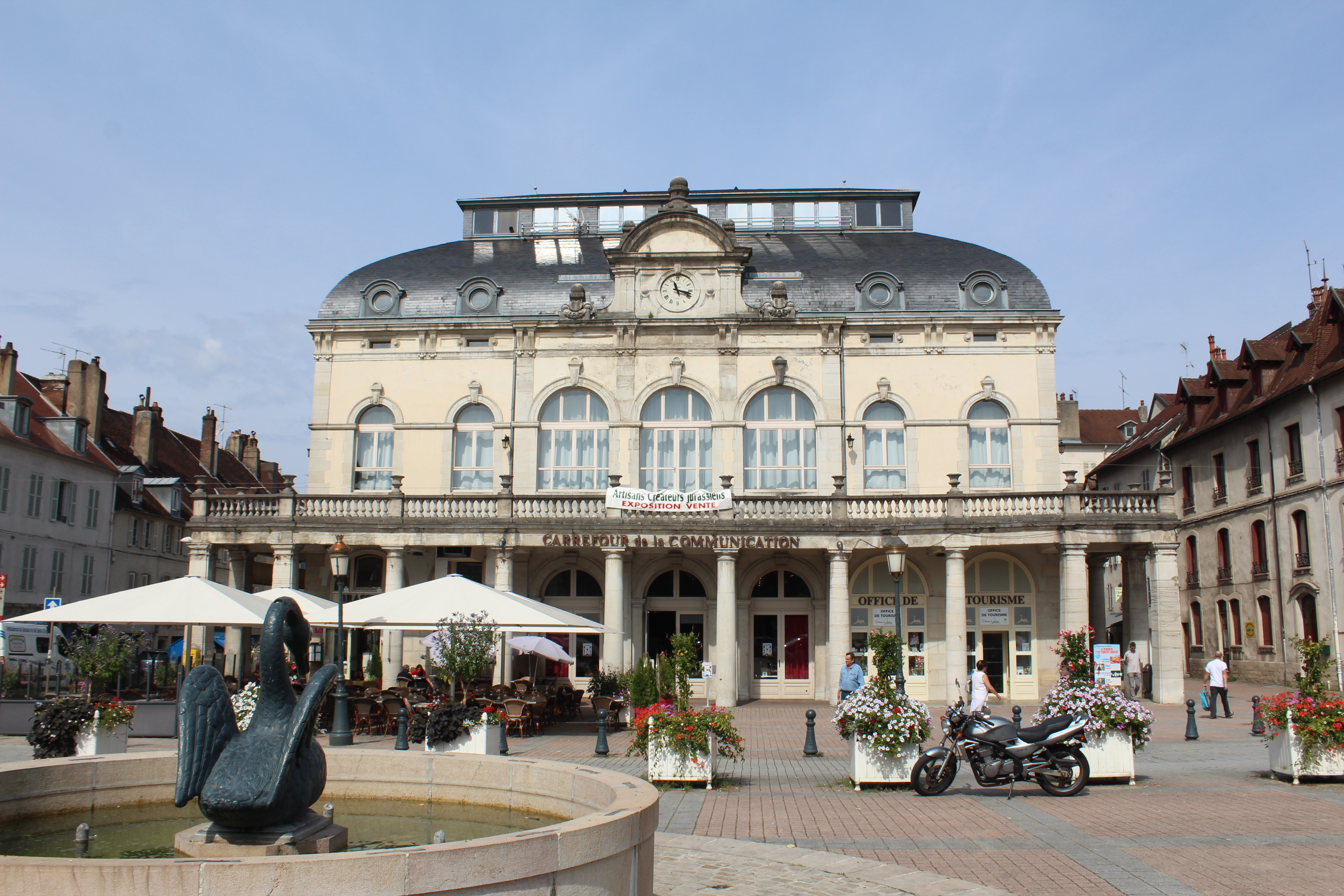
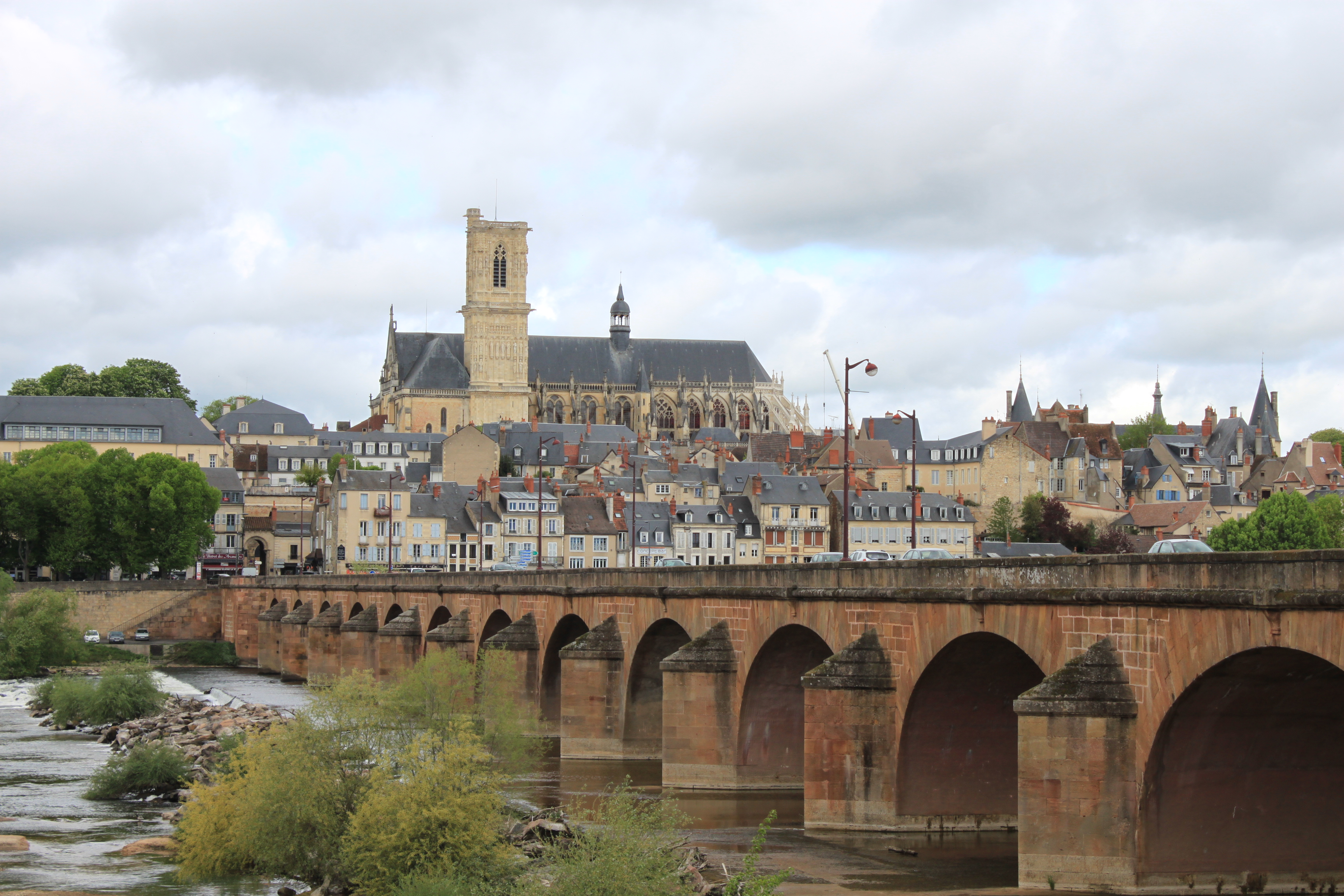
- Clockwise from top: the Cathedral of Saint John in Besançon; the Théâtre de Lons-le-Saunier; the Loire Bridge and the Cathedral in Nevers; and view of Dijon

- Flag Coat of arms Brandmark

- Country: France
- Regional council seat: Besançon
- Prefecture: Dijon
- Departments: 8: Côte-d'Or (21); Doubs (25); Haute-Saône (70); Jura (39); Nièvre (58); Saône-et-Loire (71); Territoire de Belfort (90); Yonne (89)

Government
  - President of the Regional Council: Jérôme Durain (PS)
  - Prefect: Violaine Demaret

Area
  - Total: 47,783 km^{2} (18,449 sq mi)
  - Rank: 6th

Population (2023)
  - Total: 2,802,670
  - Density: 58.654/km^{2} (151.91/sq mi)

GDP
  - Total: €81.712 billion
  - Per capita: €29,200
- Time zone: UTC+01:00 (CET)
  - Summer (DST): UTC+02:00 (CEST)
- ISO 3166 code: FR-BFC
- Website: www.bourgognefranchecomte.fr

Bourgogne-Franche-Comté (French: [buʁɡɔɲ fʁɑ̃ʃ kɔ̃te]; lit. 'Burgundy-Free County', sometimes abbreviated BFC; Arpitan: Borgogne-Franche-Comtât) is a region in France created by the 2014 territorial reform of French regions, from a merger of Burgundy and Franche-Comté. The new region came into existence on 1 January 2016, after the regional elections of December 2015, electing 100 members to the Regional Council of Bourgogne-Franche-Comté.

The region covers an area of 47,783 km^{2} (18,449 sq mi) and eight departments; it had a population of 2,811,423 in 2017. It stretches from the border with Île-de-France in the northwest to the Swiss border in the southeast and from the border with Alsace in the northeast to the border with Beaujolais in the south. It encompasses the Morvan, a large part of the Jura and a small part of the Vosges.

Its prefecture and largest city is Dijon, although the regional council sits in Besançon, making Bourgogne-Franche-Comté one of two regions in France (along with Normandy) in which the prefect does not sit in the same city as the regional council.

== Toponymy ==
The text of the territorial reform law gives interim names for most of the merged regions, combining the names of their constituent regions separated by hyphens. Permanent names would be proposed by the new regional councils and confirmed by the Conseil d'État by 1 October 2016. Hence the interim name of the new administrative region is composed of the names of former administrative regions of Burgundy and Franche-Comté. The region chose to retain its interim name as its permanent name, a decision made official by the Conseil d'État on 28 September 2016.

The merger represents a historic reunification of the Duchy of Burgundy (Duché de Bourgogne) and the Free County of Burgundy (Franche Comté de Bourgogne) that were created by the partition of the Kingdom of Burgundy in the 843 Treaty of Verdun.

== History ==
=== Middle Ages ===
The territory that is now Burgundy and Franche-Comté was already united under the Kingdom of Burgundy (from the 5th to the 8th century). It was divided into two parts: the Duchy of Burgundy (now Burgundy) of France, and the County of Burgundy (now Franche-Comté) of the Holy Roman Empire. The County was reintegrated as a free province within the Kingdom of France in the 17th century, separately from the Duchy which remained a vassal province of the Kingdom of France. These two former provinces were abolished during the French Revolution.

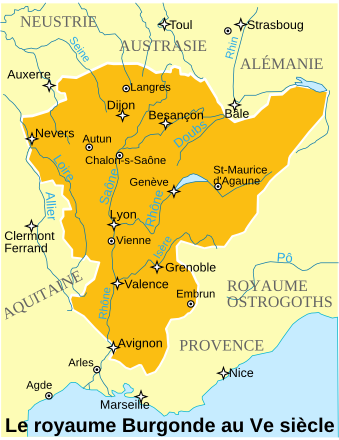
The Kingdom of Burgundy during the 5th century.

Duchy and County of Burgundy during the 14th century.

=== Modern times ===
Map of the new region with its eight departments, colored according to the historical provinces as they existed until 1790. Bourgogne Franche-Comté Nivernais Champagne Alsace Orléanais Montbéliard Île de France Others

Most of the area making up the region of Bourgogne-Franche-Comté used to belong to the former provinces of Burgundy and Franche-Comté, but it also includes a significant part of the former provinces of Nivernais (now Nièvre department), Champagne (now the northern part of Yonne department), Orléanais (now the southwestern part of Yonne), the Territoire de Belfort (the region of Alsace that remained French territory after 1871) and a small portion of Île-de-France (now the northwestern part of Yonne).

From 1941 to 1944 the regional prefecture of Vichy reunited Burgundy and Franche-Comté, as did the igamie of Dijon from 1948 to 1964. During the formation of the regions of France, Burgundy and Franche-Comté once again became two separate regions, first as public establishments in 1972, then as territorial collectivities in 1982.

On 14 April 2014, François Patriat and Marie-Guite Dufay (the presidents of Burgundy and Franche-Comté, respectively) announced in a press conference the desire for the merger of the two regions, further to the declarations of Prime Minister Manuel Valls, who proposed a simplification of the administrative divisions of France. On 2 June 2014 a map presented by President François Hollande showed the two regions as one. These two regions were the only ones to have voluntarily discussed a merger, and their alliance was the only one not needing revision by the National Assembly or the Senate.

Acte III de la décentralisation officially adopted the merger of the two regions on 17 December 2014. It became effective on 1 January 2016.

== Geography ==
The region borders Grand Est to the north, Île-de-France to the northwest, Centre-Val de Loire to the west, Auvergne-Rhône-Alpes to the south and Switzerland (the cantons of Vaud, Neuchâtel and Jura) to the east.

=== Departments ===
Bourgogne-Franche-Comté comprises eight departments: Côte-d'Or, Doubs, Jura, Nièvre, Haute-Saône, Saône-et-Loire, Yonne, Territoire de Belfort.

=== Major communities ===
The largest communes are (population as of 2017):

- Dijon (156,920; headquarters regional prefecture)
- Besançon (115,934; headquarters regional council)
- Belfort (47,656)
- Chalon-sur-Saône (45,096)
- Auxerre (34,634)
- Mâcon (33,638)
- Nevers (32,990)

== Economy ==
The gross domestic product (GDP) of the region was €75.6 billion in 2018, accounting for 3.2% of the total economic output of France. GDP per capita adjusted for purchasing power was €24,200 or 80% of the European Union average in the same year. The GDP per employee was 96% of the EU average.

== Transport ==
=== Air ===
The only airport that serves the region is Dole–Jura Airport, it is located 7 km (4 NM) southwest of Dole, and southeast of Tavaux. However, the airport only provides flights to limited destinations such as Morocco, Portugal and Corsica. Residents in the region normally use other airports such as Lyon–Saint-Exupéry Airport, EuroAirport Basel Mulhouse Freiburg, Geneva Airport, and Paris's Charles de Gaulle Airport to fly to other domestic and international destinations.

== Gallery ==
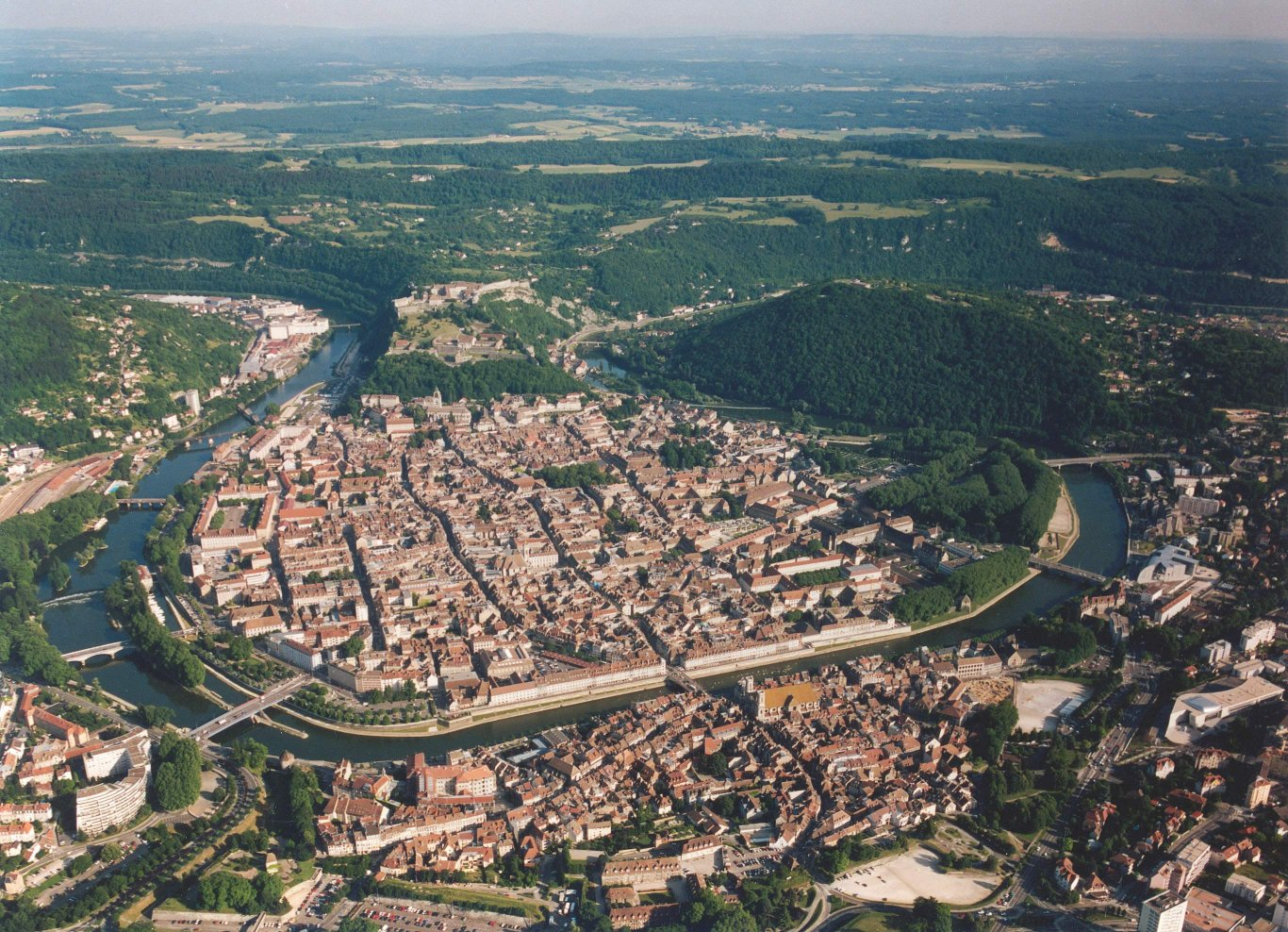
The old city of Besançon in the oxbow of the Doubs River

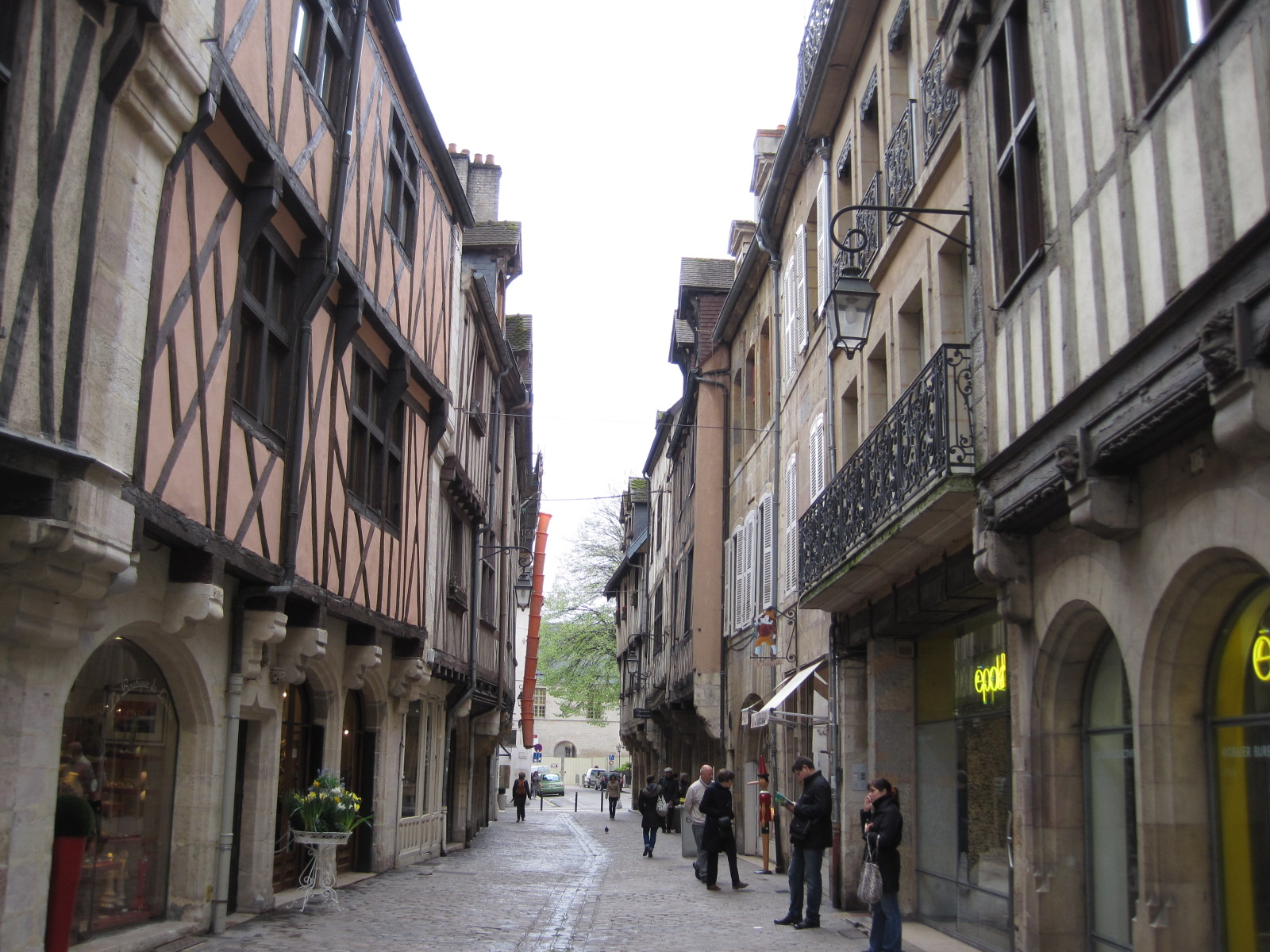
Verrerie Street, Dijon

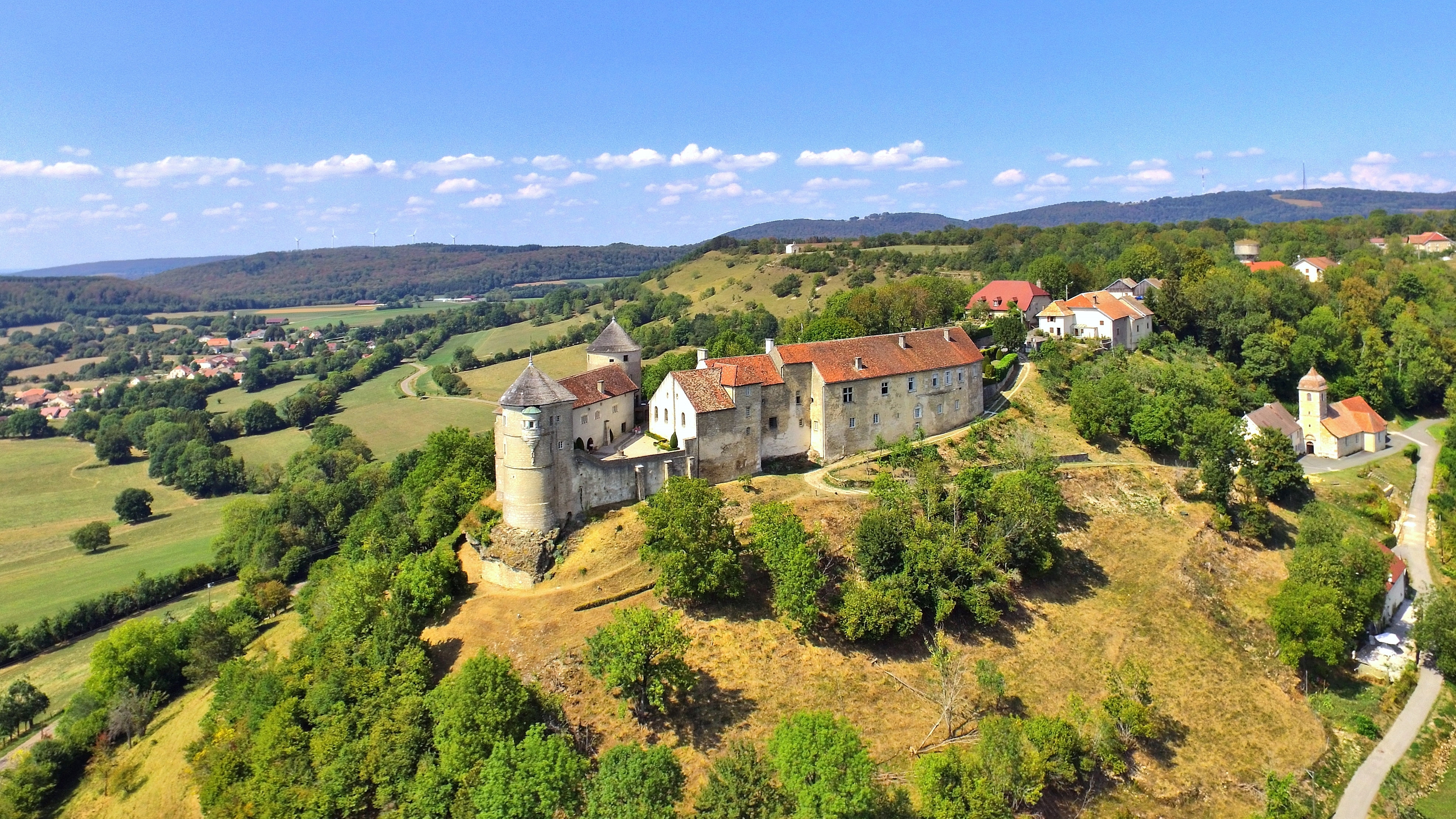
Belvoir Castle

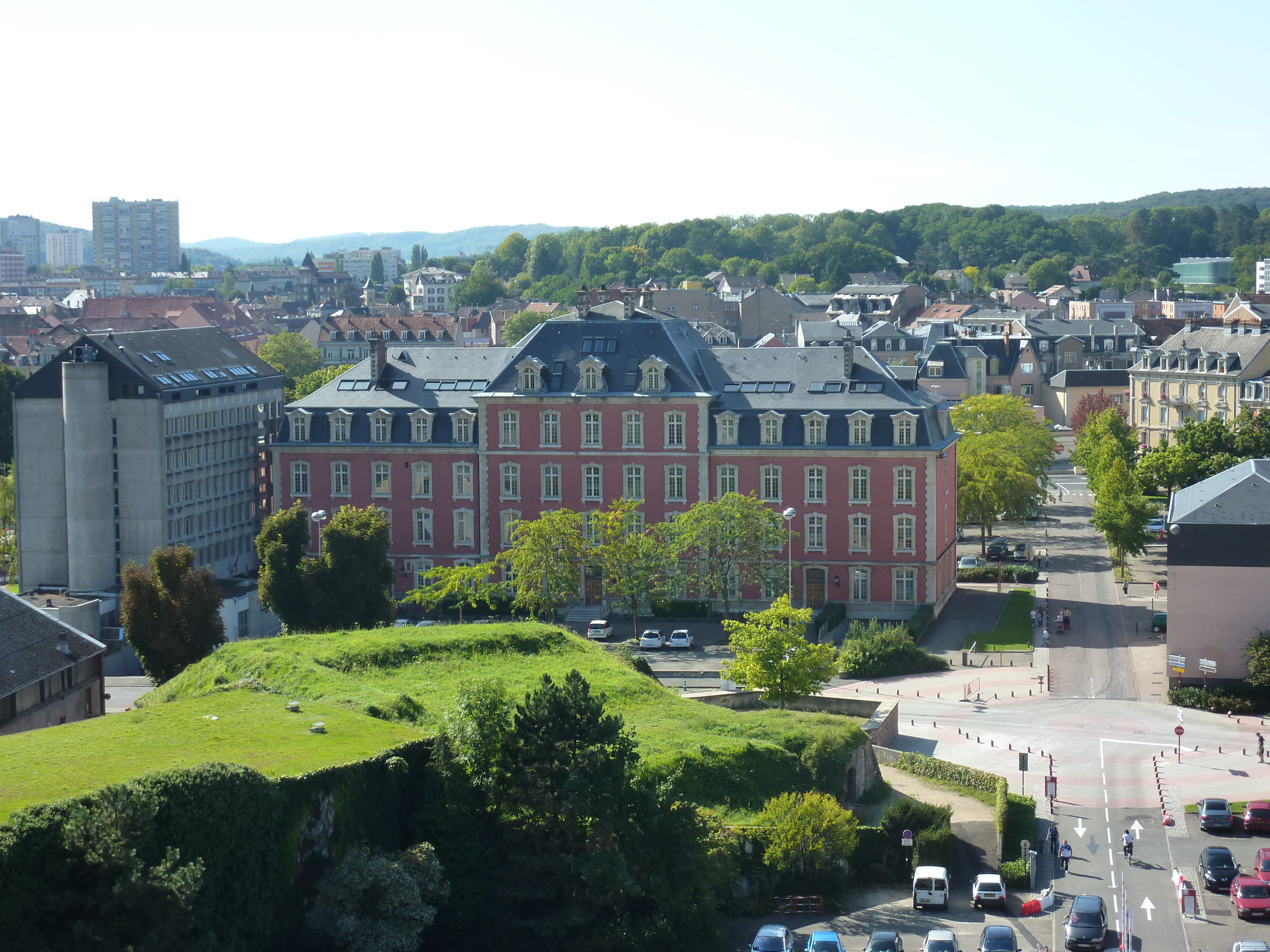
Departmental Council building, Belfort

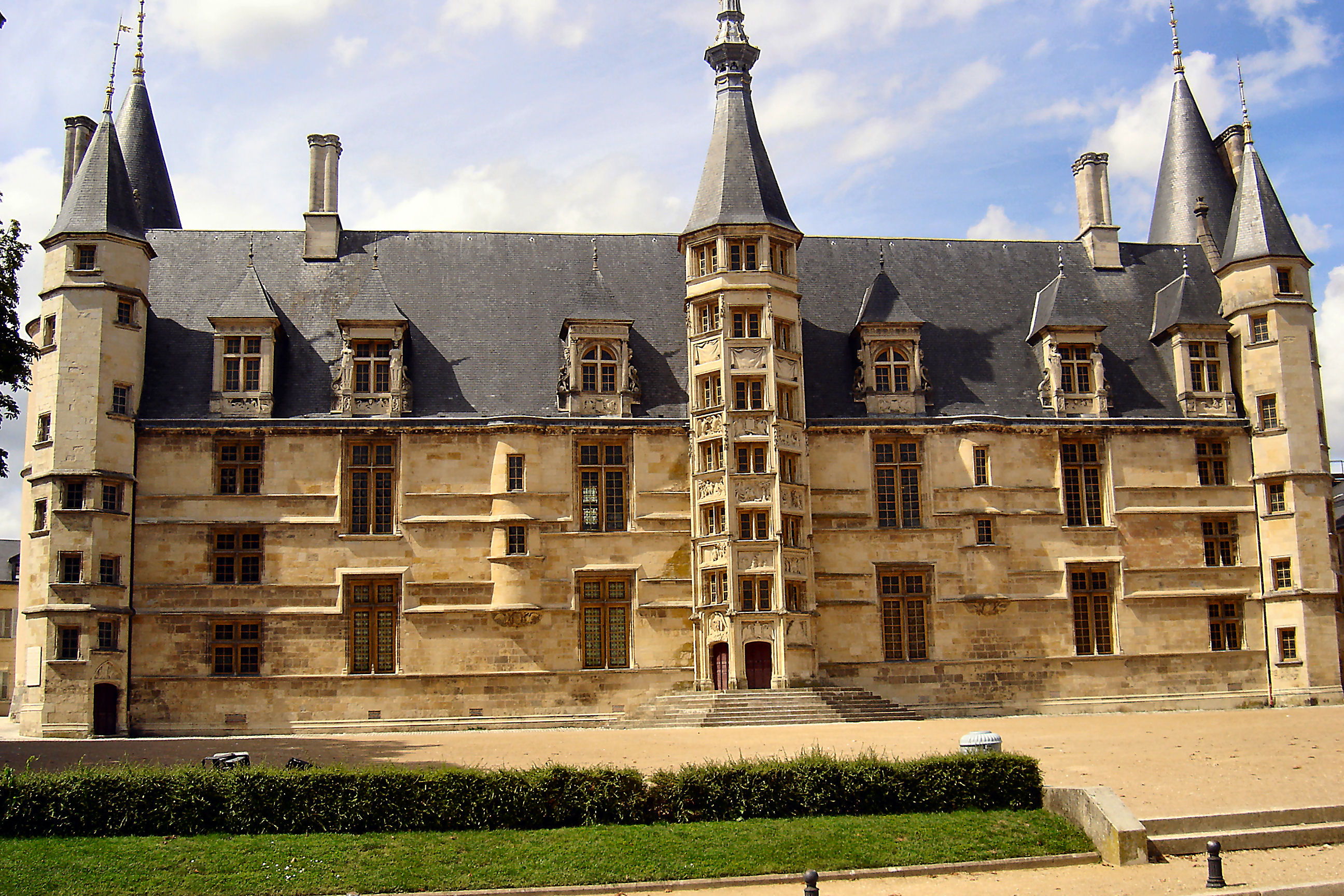
Palais ducal de Nevers

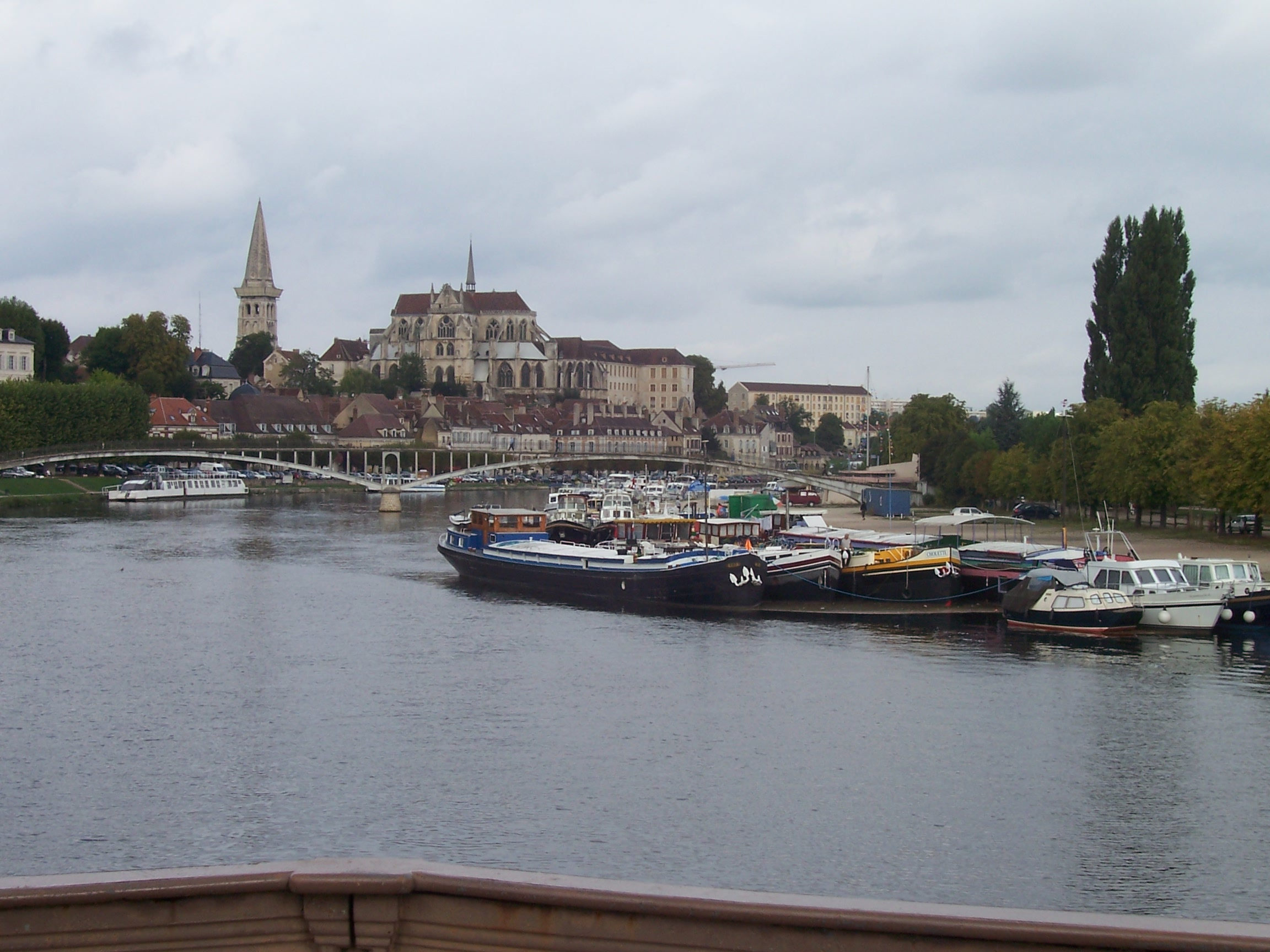
The Yonne River at Auxerre

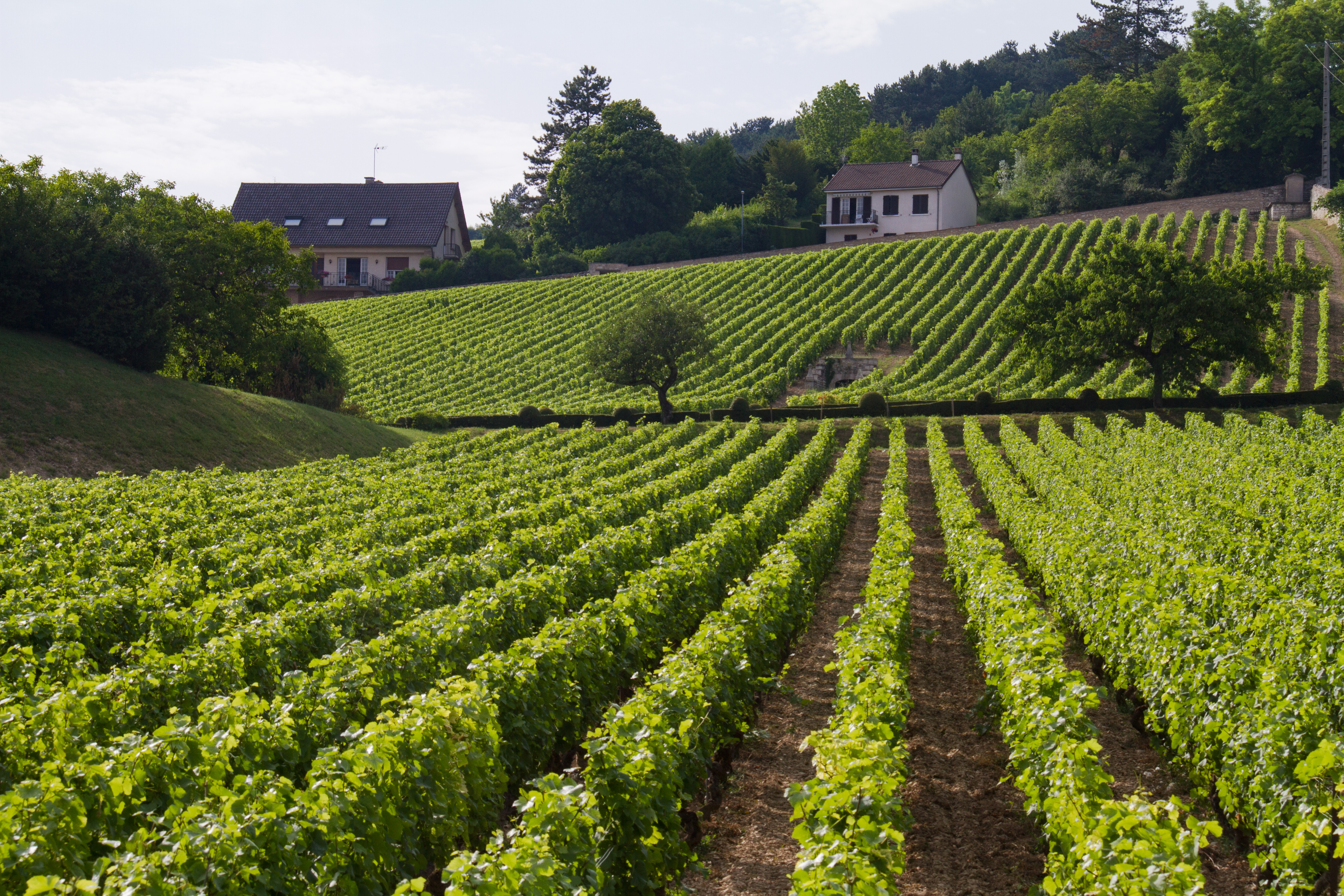
Vineyards in Volnay

== See also ==
- Burgundy
- Franche-Comté
- Regions of France
