= Alain Joyandet =

French politician

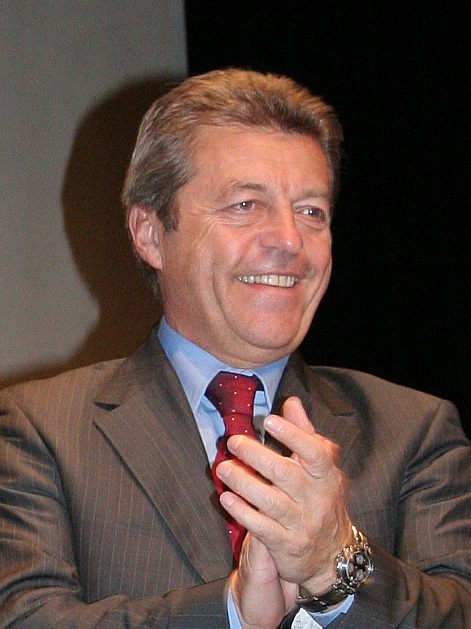

Member of the French Senate for Haute-Saône
- Incumbent
- Assumed office 1 October 2014

Secretary of State for Cooperation and Francophony
- In office 2008–2010
- President: Nicolas Sarkozy
- Prime Minister: François Fillon
- Preceded by: Jean-Marie Bockel
- Succeeded by: Henri de Raincourt

Member of the National Assembly for Haute-Saône's 1st constituency
- In office 2010–2012
- Preceded by: Patrice Debray
- Succeeded by: Alain Chrétien

President of UMP-NC-DVD Group in the Franche-Comté Regional Council De facto Leader of Opposition
- In office 25 March 2010 – 9 July 2010
- Preceded by: Sylvie Vermeillet
- Succeeded by: Sylvie Vermeillet

Personal details
- Born: 15 January 1954 (age 72) Dijon, France
- Party: UMP

Alain Joyandet (French: [alɛ̃ ʒwajɑ̃dɛ]; born 15 January 1954) is a French politician of the Republicans (LR) who has been serving as a member of the French Senate since 2014, representing Haute-Saône. From 2008 to 2010, he served as Secretary of State for Cooperation and Francophony in the government of Prime Minister François Fillon.

== Early career ==
Prior to entering national politics, Joyandet was CEO of the Société Nouvelle des Éditions Comtoises (SNEC), a publisher of weekly newspapers and journals.

== Political career ==
Joyandet was mayor of Vesoul from 1995 to 2012 and senator of Franche-Comté from 1995 to 2002.

In 2010, Joyandet won the UMP nomination for President of Franche-Comté, but lost to socialist candidate Marie-Guite Dufay in the general election.

Governmental functions

Secretary of State for Cooperation and Francophony : 2008-2010 (Resignation on 4 July 2010).

Electoral mandates

Senate of France

Senator of Haute-Saône : 1995-2002 (Resignation, became a member of the National Assembly of France in 2002).

National Assembly of France

Member of the National Assembly of France for Haute-Saône (1st constituency) : 2002-2008 (Became secretary of State in 2008) / Since 2010. Elected in 2002, reelected in 2007.

Regional Council

Leader of the Opposition in the Regional Council : March–July 2010.

Regional councillor of Franche-Comté : march-July 2010 (Resignation).

General Council

General councillor of Haute-Saône : 1992-2002 (Resignation). Reelected in 1998.

Municipal Council

Mayor of Vesoul : 1995-2012. Reelected in 2001, 2008.

Municipal councillor of Vesoul : since 1989. Reelected in 1995, 2001, 2008

== Other activities ==
- French Development Agency (AFD), Member of the Supervisory Board

== Controversy ==
On 4 July 2010, Joyandet resigned his government post, the same day as Christian Blanc, Secretary of State for Development of the capital region. The French press had reported the suspected misuse of public money by the two ministers. Joyandet was accused of renting a private jet to €116,500 to travel to Martinique, where he was to attend an international conference for reconstruction after the earthquake of Haiti.

An article in Canard Enchaîné also suspected Joyandet of having received an illegal building permit for his house of Grimaud, which he abandoned shortly after.

Assembly seats
Preceded by Michel Miroudot	French Senator from Haute-Saône serving with Bernard Joly; 1995–2002	Succeeded by Christian Bergelin
Preceded by Christian Bergelin	Member of National Assembly of France from Haute-Saône 1st Constituency; 2002–2008	Succeeded by Patrice Debray
Preceded by Patrice Debray	Member of National Assembly of France from Haute-Saône 1st Constituency; 2010–	Succeeded by Incumbent
Political offices
Preceded by Jean-Marie Bockel	State Secretary of Cooperation and Francophony; 2008–2010	Succeeded by Function deleted
Preceded by Loïc Niepeceron	Mayor of Vesoul; 1995–2012	Succeeded by Alain Chrétien
Party political offices
Preceded by Jean-François Humbert	Union for a Popular Movement nominee for President of Franche Comté; 2010 (lost)	Succeeded by current nominee
Preceded by Sylvie Vermeillet	President of UMP Group in the Franche-Comté Regional Council; 2010–2010	Succeeded by Sylvie Vermeillet
