= Saône-et-Loire's 3rd constituency =

Constituency of the French Fifth Republic

3rd constituency of Saône-et-Loire
- inline Constituency of the National Assembly of France

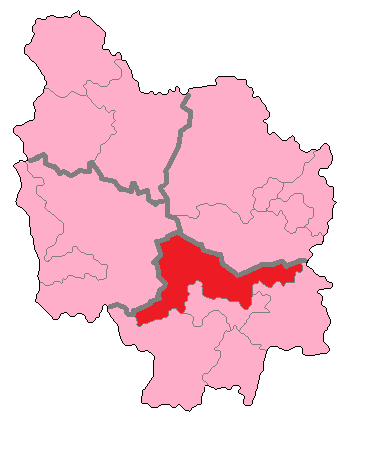
- Saône-et-Loire's 3rd Constituency shown within Burgundy
- Deputy: Aurélien Dutremble; RN
- Department: Saône-et-Loire
- Cantons: Autun-Nord, Autun-Sud, Chagny, Couches, Le Creusot-Est, Le Creusot-Ouest, Épinac, Givry, Issy-l'Évêque, Lucenay-l'Évêque, Mesvres, Saint-Léger-sous-Beuvray, Verdun-sur-le-Doubs
- Registered voters: 83,724

The 3rd constituency of the Saône-et-Loire is a French legislative constituency in the Saône-et-Loire département.

== Description ==
The 3rd constituency of the Saône-et-Loire covers the north of the department around the Roman city of Autun and the industrial town Le Creusot famed for its iron works.

Between 1988 and 2012 control of the seat swapped between Socialist André Billardon and Gaullist Jean-Paul Anciaux.

== Historic Representation ==
Election	Member	Party
1986	Proportional representation – no election by constituency	
1988	André Billardon	PS
1993	Jean-Paul Anciaux	RPR
1997	André Billardon	PS
2002	Jean-Paul Anciaux	UMP
2007	Jean-Paul Anciaux	UMP
2012	Philippe Baumel	PS
2017	Rémy Rebeyrotte	LREM
2022	Rémy Rebeyrotte	LREM
2024	Aurélien Dutremble	RN

== Election results ==
=== 2024 ===
Candidate	Party	Alliance	First round			Second round		
Candidate	Party	Alliance	Votes	%	+/–	Votes	%	+/–
Aurélien Dutremble	RN		23,130	42.67	+17.08	26,523	50.06	+3.81
Rémy Rebeyrotte	RE	Ensemble	13,606	25.10	-6.64	26,458	49.94	-3.81
Richard Beninger	LFI	NFP	10,375	19.14	-2.05	withdrew		
Charles Landre	DVD		5,384	9.93	-0.53			
France Robert	DLF		783	1.44	-0.06			
Julie Lucotte	LO		730	1.35	-0.27			
José Antonio Granado	DIV		193	0.36	new			
Votes			54,201	100.00		52,981	100.00	
Valid votes			54,201	96.50	-0.61	52,981	93.80	+3.67
Blank votes			1,232	2.19	+0.16	2,442	4.32	-3.00
Null votes			733	1.31	+0.45	1,061	1.88	-0.67
Turnout			56,166	69.43	+19.46	56,484	69.84	+22.56
Abstentions			24,735	30.57	-19.46	24,395	30.16	-22.56
Registered voters			80,901			80,879		
Result			RN GAIN FROM RE					

=== 2022 ===
Legislative Election 2022: Saône-et-Loire's 3rd constituency
Party	Candidate	Votes	%	±%
LREM (Ensemble)	Rémy Rebeyrotte	12,500	31.74	-1.28
RN	Sandrine Baroin	10,077	25.59	+11.07
LFI (NUPÉS)	Richard Beninger	8,346	21.19	−8.33
LR (UDC)	Charles Landre	4,119	10.46	−7.04
REC	Anne Bigot	1,614	4.10	N/A
DVE	Muriel Berthelier	1,499	3.81	+2.54
Others	N/A	1,228	-	−
Turnout		39,383	49.97	+0.92
2nd round result
LREM (Ensemble)	Rémy Rebeyrotte	18,593	53.75	-1.68
RN	Sandrine Baroin	16,000	46.25	N/A
Turnout		34,593	47.28	+10.22
LREM hold				

=== 2017 ===
Legislative Election 2017: Saône-et-Loire's 3rd constituency
Party	Candidate	Votes	%	±%
LREM	Rémy Rebeyrotte	13,400	33.02	
LR	Charles Landre	7,100	17.50	
PS	Philippe Baumel	6,719	16.56	
FN	Quentin Bijard	5,893	14.52	
LFI	Pierre Aceituno	3,819	9.41	
EELV	Pierre-Etienne Graffard	864	2.13	
Others	N/A	2,781		
Turnout		40,576	49.05	
2nd round result
LREM	Rémy Rebeyrotte	16,993	55.43	
LR	Charles Landre	13,661	44.57	
Turnout		30,654	37.06	
LREM gain from PS				

=== 2012 ===
Legislative Election 2012: Saône-et-Loire's 3rd constituency
Party	Candidate	Votes	%	±%
PS	Philippe Baumel	18,504	36.57	
UMP	Jean-Paul Anciaux	16,309	32.24	
FN	Estelle Arnal	8,159	16.13	
DVG	Rémy Rebeyrotte	3,736	7.38	
FG	Serge Desbrosses	1,742	3.44	
EELV	François Lotteau	1,571	3.11	
Others	N/A	571		
Turnout		50,592	60.42	
2nd round result
PS	Philippe Baumel	25,914	53.78	
UMP	Jean-Paul Anciaux	22,275	46.22	
Turnout		48,189	57.56	
PS gain from UMP				

=== 2007 ===
Legislative Election 2007: Saône-et-Loire's 3rd constituency
Party	Candidate	Votes	%	±%
UMP	Jean-Paul Anciaux	18,637	45.90	
PS	Evelyne Coullerot	14,040	34.58	
MoDem	Hugues De Noiron	2,106	5.19	
FN	Michel Launay	1,971	4.85	
LCR	Maurice Brochot	1,376	3.39	
LV	Geneviève Girault	1,072	2.64	
Others	N/A	1,404	-	
Turnout		41,602	62.37	
2nd round result
UMP	Jean-Paul Anciaux	21,233	51.49	
PS	Evelyne Coullerot	20,006	48.51	
Turnout		42,550	63.80	
UMP hold				

=== 2002 ===
Legislative Election 2002: Saône-et-Loire's 3rd constituency
Party	Candidate	Votes	%	±%
UMP	Jean-Paul Anciaux	15,881	37.29	
PS	Philippe Baumel	11,953	28.07	
FN	Pierre de Saint-Léger	4,685	11.00	
PRG	Claudette Brunet-Lechenault	4,023	9.45	
PCF	Nicolas Turoman	1,255	2.95	
UDF	Lionel Bescout	896	2.10	
Others	N/A	3,894	-	
Turnout		43,857	64.88	
2nd round result
UMP	Jean-Paul Anciaux	20,636	51.59	
PS	Philippe Baumel	19,363	48.41	
Turnout		41,992	62.13	
UMP gain from PS				

=== 1997 ===
Legislative Election 1997: Saône-et-Loire's 3rd constituency
Party	Candidate	Votes	%	±%
PS	André Billardon	17,017	38.08	
RPR	Jean-Paul Anciaux	13,622	30.49	
FN	Eugène Terret	5,911	13.23	
PCF	Michel Rodier	3,456	7.73	
GE	Alexis Vachon	1,595	3.57	
LO	Nuria Matusinski	1,049	2.35	
LDI	Joël Talon	954	2.13	
DVG	Xavier Paillard	657	1.47	
PT	Liliane Rayne-Davanture	423	0.95	
Turnout		47,752	70.39	
2nd round result
PS	André Billardon	26,556	57.13	
RPR	Jean-Paul Anciaux	19,925	42.87	
Turnout		49,792	73.44	
PS gain from RPR				

== Sources ==
Official results of French elections from 2002: "Résultats électoraux officiels en France" (in French).
