= Regional Council of Burgundy =

Regional legislature of Burgundy, France

Regional Council of Burgundy Conseil régional de Bourgogne
- Flag of Burgundy

Type
- Type: Unicameral

History
- Disbanded: 1 January 2016

Leadership
- President: François Patriat, PS since 2 April 2004
- Seats: 57

Meeting place
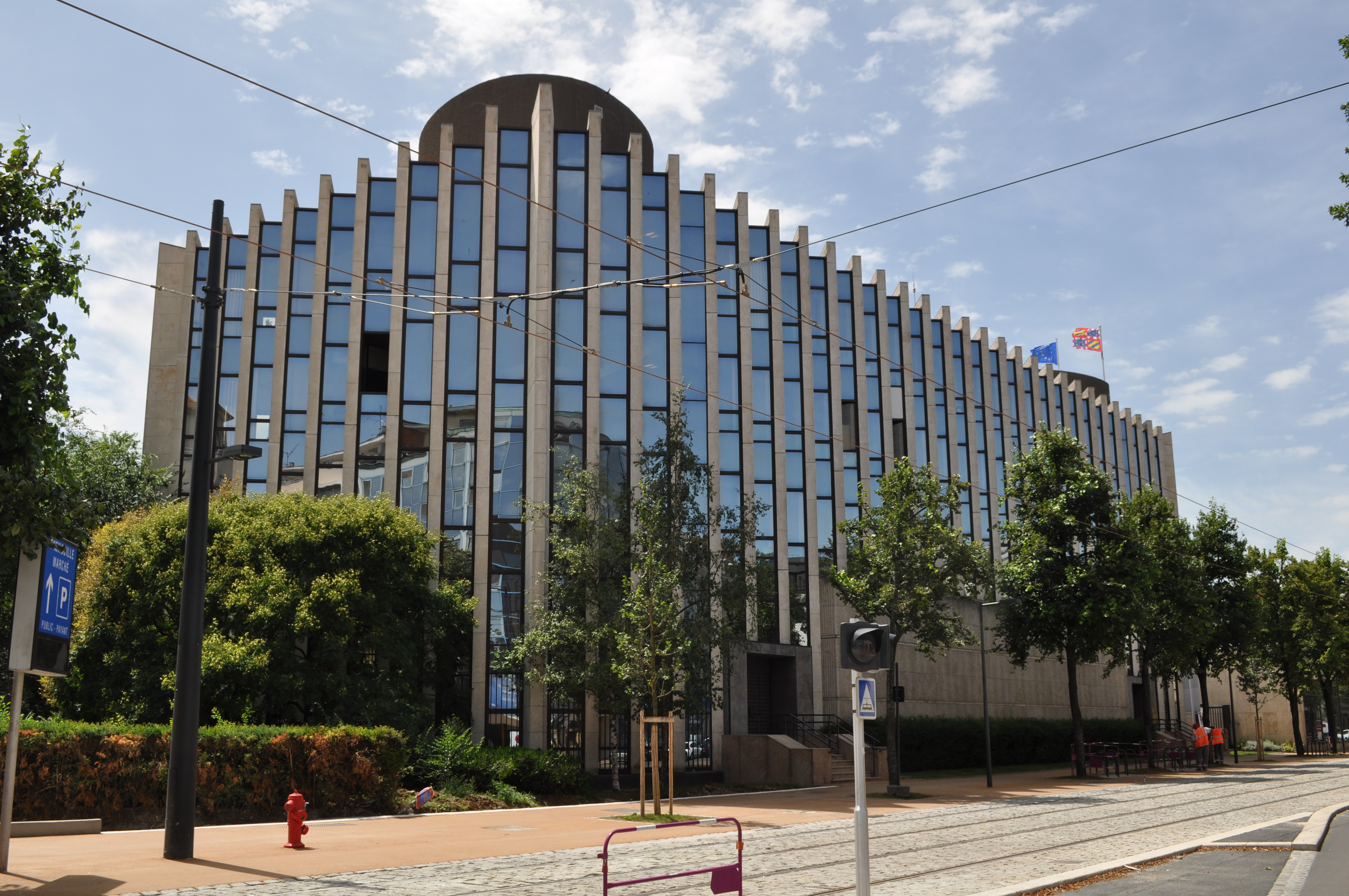
- Hôtel de région, Dijon

The Regional Council of Burgundy (French: Conseil régional de Bourgogne, Arpitan: Consèly règ·ionâl de Borgogne) was the deliberative assembly administering the Burgundy region until its merger in December 2015. The term can also, in a more restricted sense, designate the elected assembly which defined the policy of this community.The council was headquartered in the Hôtel de Région in Dijon, at 17 boulevard de la Trémouille, next to Place de la République.

On 1 January 2016, date of the creation of the Bourgogne-Franche-Comté region, the Burgundy Regional Council was incorporated within the Regional Council of Bourgogne-Franche-Comté.

== Composition ==
The Burgundy Regional Council was chaired by François Patriat (PS) from 2004 until December 2015. He won by 52.65% of the votes cast in the second round of the regional election in 2010.

=== Presidents of the Regional Council ===
List of former presidents of the Council
Term	Name	Party
1974 - 1978	Jean Chamant	RI
1978 - 1979	Marcel Lucotte	UDF
1979 - 1982	Pierre Joxe	PS
1982 - 1983	André Billardon	PS
1983 - 1985	Louis-Frédéric Lescure	UDF
1985 - 1989	Marcel Lucotte	UDF
1989 - 1992	Raymond Janot	UDF
1992 - 1993	Jean-Pierre Soisson	UMP
1993 - 1998	Jean-François Bazin	RPR
1998 - 2004	Jean-Pierre Soisson	UMP
2004 - 2015	François Patriat	PS

=== Vice Presidents (2010-2015) ===
Order	Regional advisor	Party	Delegation
1st	Michel Neugnot	PS	Finances, plans and evaluation, staff and police, mobility and participatory democracy
2nd	Safia Otokore	PS	International development and decentralized cooperation, sport and the fight against discrimination
3rd	Florence Ombret	PS	Social cohesion, city policy and urban renewal
4th	Nicole Eschmann	EELV	High schools
5th	Jerome Durain	PS	Spatial planning and contractual policies of the countries
6th	Francoise Tenenbaum	PS	Culture
7th	Guy Férez	PS	Public health and healthcare establishments
8th	Fadila Khattabi	PS	Vocational training and apprenticeship
9th	Philippe Hervieu	EELV	Social and solidarity economy and ecological transformation of the economy
10th	Jean-Claude Lagrange	PS	Employment and economic development
11th	Dominique Lapôtre	PRG	Environment, sustainable development and eco-responsibility
12th	Jean-Paul Pinaud	PCF	Rail transport
13th	Nisrine Zaïbi	PS	Youth
14th	Jacques Rebillard	DVG	Agriculture, forestry and agrifood industries
15th	Sylvie Martin	PS	Tourism and canals
