= Fousseret =

Fousseret is a French surname. Notable people with the surname include:

- Alain Fousseret (1956–2022), French politician
- Jean-Louis Fousseret (born 1946), French politician, brother of Alain

== See also ==
- Le Fousseret, a commune of Haute-Garonne, France
