= 2004 Franche-Comté regional election =

← 1998	21 and 28 March 2004	2010 →

All 43 seats to the Franche-Comté Regional Council
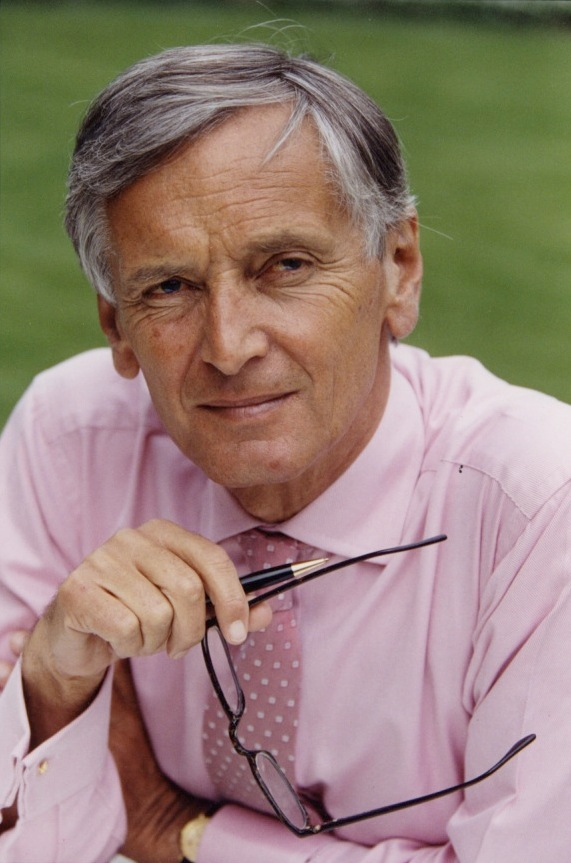
	First party	Second party	Third party
Leader	Raymond Forni	Jean-François Humbert	Sophie Montel
Party	PS	UMP	FN
Seats won	26	12	5
Popular vote	240 551	185 761	87 766
Percentage	46.79%	36.13%	17.07%
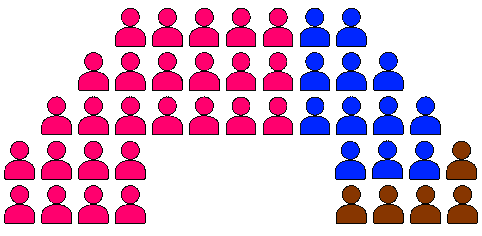
President before election
Jean-François Humbert
UMP
Elected President
Raymond Forni
PS

A regional election took place in Franche-Comté, France on 21 and 28 March 2004, along with all other regions. Raymond Forni (PS) was elected President, defeating incumbent Jean-François Humbert (UMP).

== Election results ==
Franche-Comté regional election, 2004
Party	Candidate	Votes	%	±%
PS	Raymond Forni	146,553	31.28	
UMP	Jean-François Humbert	116,354	24.84	
FN	Sophie Montel	87,498	18.68	
UDF	Gerard Faivre	36,029	7.69	
MEI	Jacques Lancon	26,477	5.65	
LO	Christian Driano	22,059	4.71	
PCF	Evelyne Ternant	19,577	4.18	
MNR	Marie France Ligney	6,914	1.48	
Other	Hervée de Lafond	5,884	1.26	
Other	Jean-Philippe Allenbach	1,154	0.25	
Majority		249,882		
Turnout		499,764		
PS	Raymond Forni	240,551	46.79	
UMP	Jean-François Humbert	185,761	36.13	
FN	Sophie Montel	87,766	17.07	
Majority		268,941		
Turnout		537,881		
PS gain from UMP		Swing	10.66	
