= Aurélien Dutremble =

French politician (born 1978)

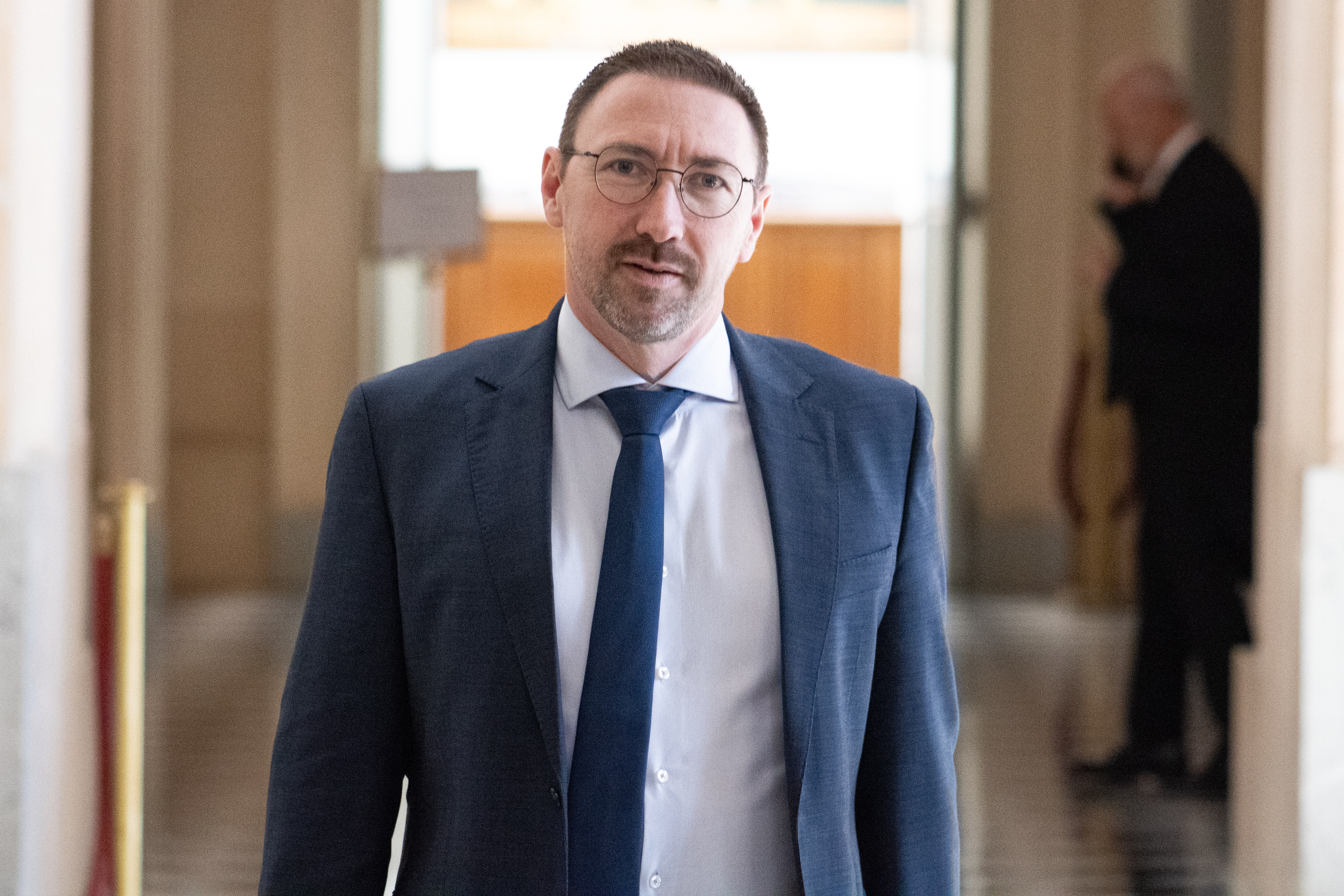

Member of the National Assembly for Saône-et-Loire's 3rd constituency
- Incumbent
- Assumed office 8 July 2024
- Preceded by: Rémy Rebeyrotte

Personal details
- Born: 23 December 1978 (age 47) Saint-Rémy, France
- Party: National Rally (2015–present)

Aurélien Dutremble (French pronunciation: [ɔʁeljɛ̃ dytʁɑ̃bl]; born 23 December 1978) is a French politician of the National Rally (RN) who has represented the 3rd constituency of Saône-et-Loire in the National Assembly since 2024. He also serves as the departmental secretary of the RN in Saône-et-Loire and as a member of the Regional Council of Bourgogne-Franche-Comté (2021–present); he started his political career as a municipal councillor in Mâcon (2020–2026).

== Biography ==
Dutremble was born in 1978 in Saint-Rémy, Saône-et-Loire. A hospital technician by profession, he is the head of the National Rally in Saône-et-Loire.

He decided to join the National Rally in 2015 to help, as an activist, one of his acquaintances who was running in the departmental and regional elections. Dutremble describes himself as "self-taught."

In the 2020 municipal elections, he was elected city councilor of Mâcon, after leading the “Rassemblement national et d'ouverture” list. He was also elected, in the June 2021 regional elections, as a member of the Regional Council of Bourgogne-Franche-Comté. According to France Bleu, he is “little known outside his stronghold in Mâcon” and “reputed to be discreet.” Le Journal de Saône-et-Loire uses the same description, highlighting in a November 2023 article his lack of involvement in the municipal council and community council of Mâconnais Beaujolais Agglomération since the elections three and a half years earlier and his absence from the last nine community council meetings.

He was elected representative of the third district of Saône-et-Loire's 3rd constituency on July 7, 2024, under the RN banner. In the second round, he won 50.06% of the vote, with only a 65-vote lead over the outgoing Renaissance (French political party) representative Rémy Rebeyrotte.
