= Jean-François Humbert =

French politician (1952–2025)

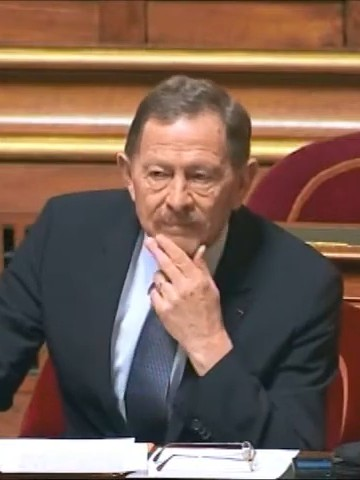
- Humbert in 2012

Senator for the Doubs
- In office 1 October 1998 – 30 September 2014 Serving with Claude Jeannerot & Martial Bourquin
- Preceded by: Jean Pourchet

Regional Council of Franche-Comté
- In office 21 March 1986 – 14 March 2010

5th President of Franche-Comté
- In office 20 March 1998 – 2 April 2004
- Preceded by: Pierre Chantelat
- Succeeded by: Raymond Forni

Personal details
- Born: 17 October 1952 Besançon, France
- Died: 19 November 2025 (aged 73) Issoudun, France
- Party: Union for a Popular Movement

Jean-François Humbert (French pronunciation: [ʒɑ̃ fʁɑ̃swa œ̃bɛʁ]; 17 October 1952 – 19 November 2025) was a French politician who was a member of the Senate of France. He represented the Doubs department and was a member of the Union for a Popular Movement (UMP) Party.

In the 2004 Franche-Comté regional election, he solicited reelection as President of Franche-Comté but was defeated by Socialist Raymond Forni.

In the 2008 French Senate election he was narrowly reelected as Senator.

On 17 October 2009, he announced that he would challenge Socialist President Marie-Marguerite Dufay and UMP candidate Alain Joyandet in the 2010 Franche-Comté regional election. Nine days later, he resigned the Presidency of UMP Group in the Regional Council.

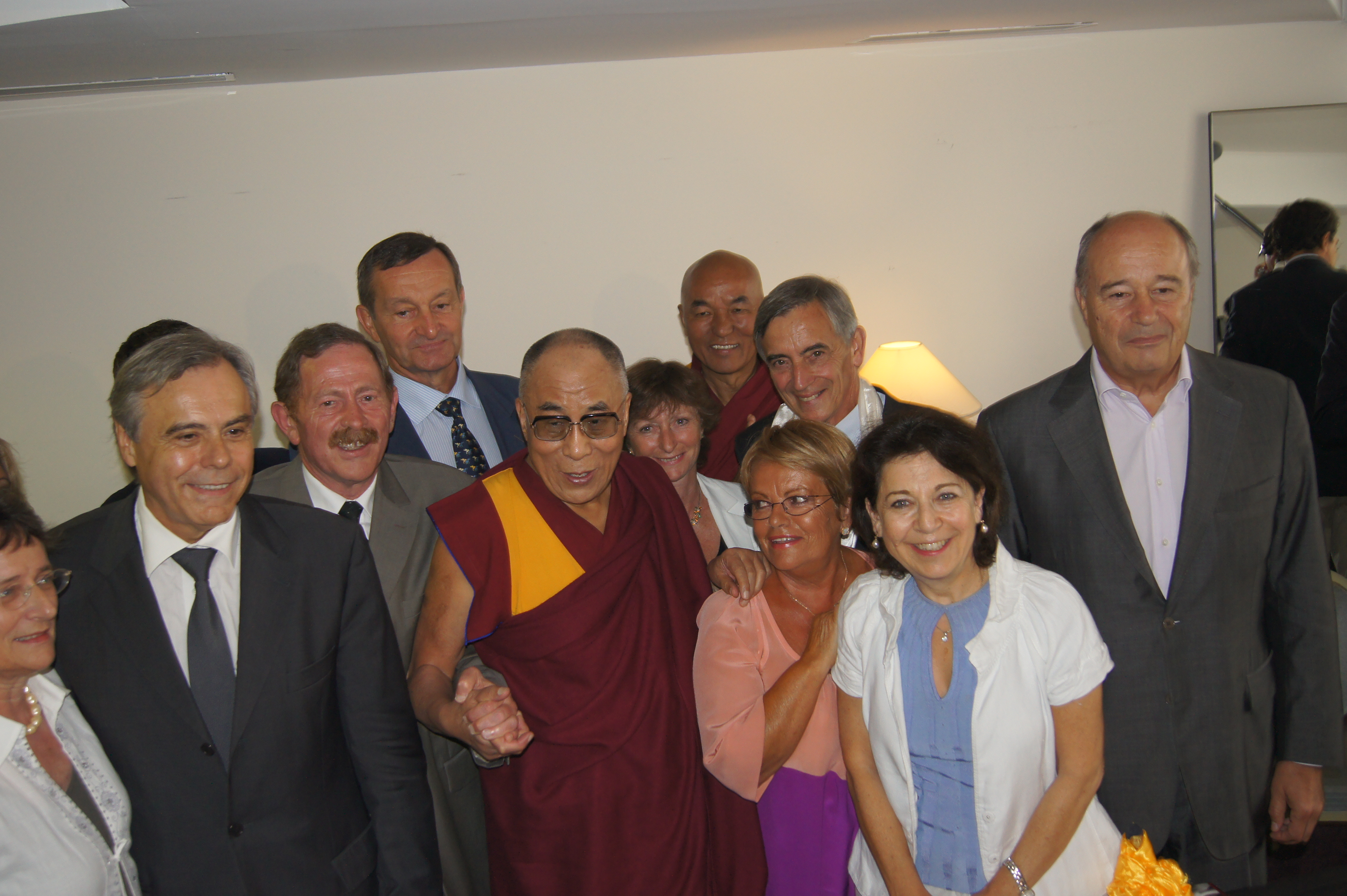
Jean-François Humbert (left to the Dalai Lama) at the meeting of Parliamentarians with the 14th Dalai Lama in Toulouse, 15 August 2011

Humbert died on 19 November 2025, at the age of 73.
