= List of presidents of the Regional Council of Franche-Comté =

The president of the Franche-Comté Regional Council prepares and supervises the spending of the budget and the decisions voted by the regional councillors. She is in charge of financial management and is head of the regional administration. It is also her role to ensure the direction of the patrimony (for example the secondary schools) and to represent the institution with the national and European organisms.

She has numerous functions: convening and chairing meetings, preparing and carrying out deliberations, signing conventions and acting as legal representative of the institution. If necessary, the president can delegate some of his functions to his vice-presidents.

The president of the regional council is assisted by 10 vice-presidents entrusted with different missions. Together they form the bureau which decides the main outlines of regional policy and ensures their implementation.

== List of presidents of the Franche-Comté Regional Council ==
President		Party	Took office	Left office	Notes
1	Edgar Faure	UDR; RPR	1974	1981	• Prime Minister of France • President of the National Assembly of France
2	Jean-Pierre Chevènement	PS	1981	1982	• Minister of Defence • Minister of the Interior • Minister of Education
3	Edgar Faure	DL	1982	1988	• Prime Minister of France • President of the National Assembly of France
4	Pierre Chantelat	UDF-PR	1988	1998	• Member of French National Assembly
5	Jean-François Humbert	UDF; UMP	1998	2004	• Member of French Senate
6	Raymond Forni	PS	2004	2008	• President of the National Assembly of France • Died in office
7	Marie-Marguerite Dufay	PS	2008	Incumbent	• First Women President

== See also ==
- Franche-Comté Regional Council
