= 2010 Franche-Comté regional election =

← 2004	14 March and 21 March 2010
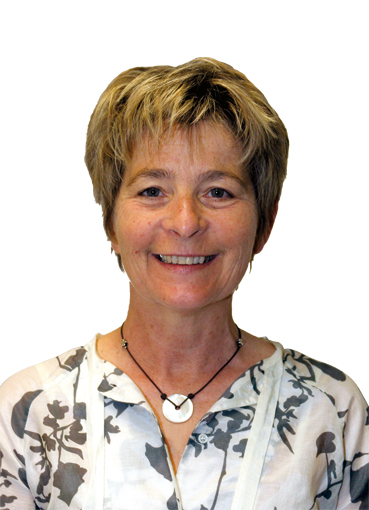

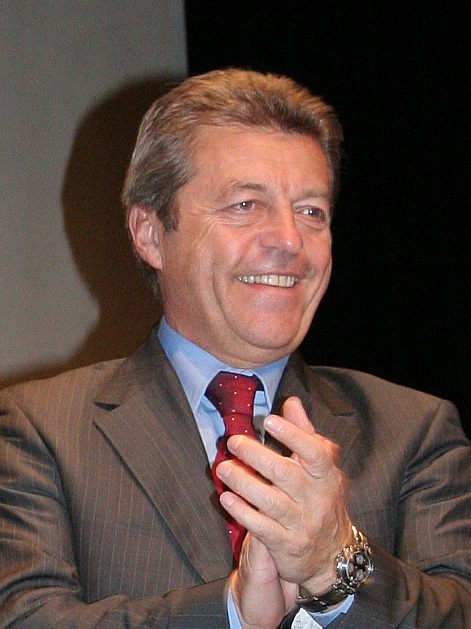
Nominee	Marie-Marguerite Dufay	Alain Joyandet
Party	PS	UMP
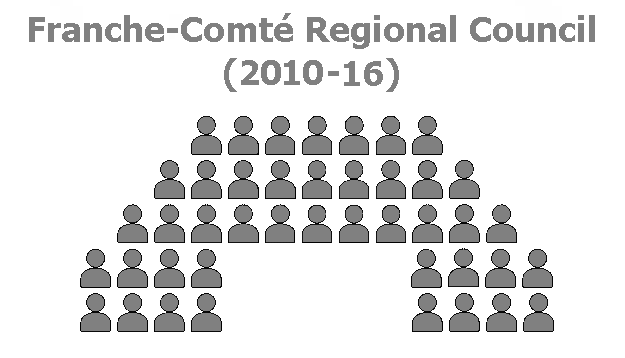
President before election
Marie-Marguerite Dufay
PS
Elected President
TBD

The Franche-Comté regional election, 2010 took place in March 2010.

== General Election ==
=== First round ===
Franche-Comté regional election, 2010
Party	Candidate	Votes	%	±%
PS	Marie-Marguerite Dufay			
UMP	Alain Joyandet			
FN	Sophie Montel			
LV	Alain Fousseret			
MoDem	Christophe Grudler			
LO	Michel Treppo			
FG	Evelyne Ternant			
NPA	Laurence Lyonnais			
DLR	Jean-Claude Chomette			
Other	Christophe Devillers			
Majority		TBD		
Turnout		TBD		

==== Withdraw ====
- Jacques Mérédic-Chevrot (New Centre).
- Jean-Philippe Allenbach (Mouvement Franche-Comté), Perennial candidate.
- Jean-François Humbert (DVD), Former President of Franche-Comté and current French Senator.

== Primary elections ==
=== Socialist Party Primary ===
Socialist Party primary for Franche-Comté regional election, 2010
Party	Candidate	Votes	%	±%
PS	Marie-Marguerite Dufay		93.18%	
PS	Jean-Philippe Huelin		6.82%	

=== Union for a Popular Movement Primary ===
Union for a Popular Movement primary for Franche-Comté regional election, 2010
Party	Candidate	Votes	%	±%
UMP	Alain Joyandet	2,365	100.00%	
