= Jérôme Durain =

French politician (born 1969)

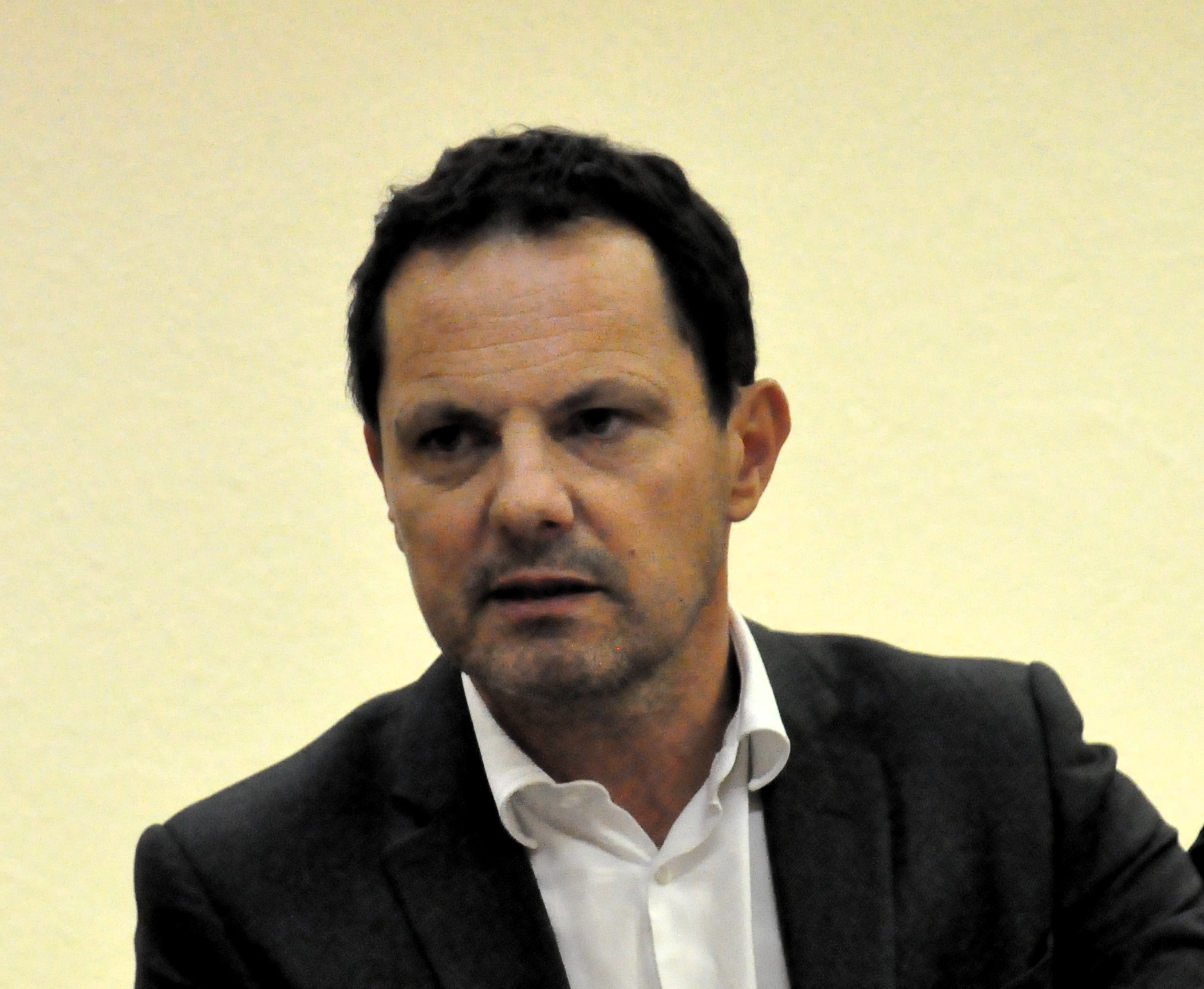
- Durain in 2024

Member of the Senate
- Incumbent
- Assumed office 1 October 2014
- Constituency: Saône-et-Loire

Personal details
- Born: 2 June 1969 (age 57)
- Party: Socialist Party

Jérôme Durain (born 2 June 1969) is a French politician serving as a member of the Senate since 2014. He is a member of the Regional Council of Bourgogne-Franche-Comté and served as vice president of the Regional Council of Burgundy from 2012 to 2015.
