= Patrice Debray =

French politician (born 1951)

Member of the National Assembly for Haute-Saône's 1st constituency
- In office 2008–2010
- Succeeded by: Alain Joyandet

Personal details
- Born: 25 January 1951 (age 75) Neuerburg, Germany
- Party: UMP
- Profession: Physician

Patrice Debray (born 25 January 1951) is a member of the National Assembly of France. He represents the Haute-Saône department, and is a member of the Union for a Popular Movement.
