= Rémy Rebeyrotte =

French politician (born 1966)

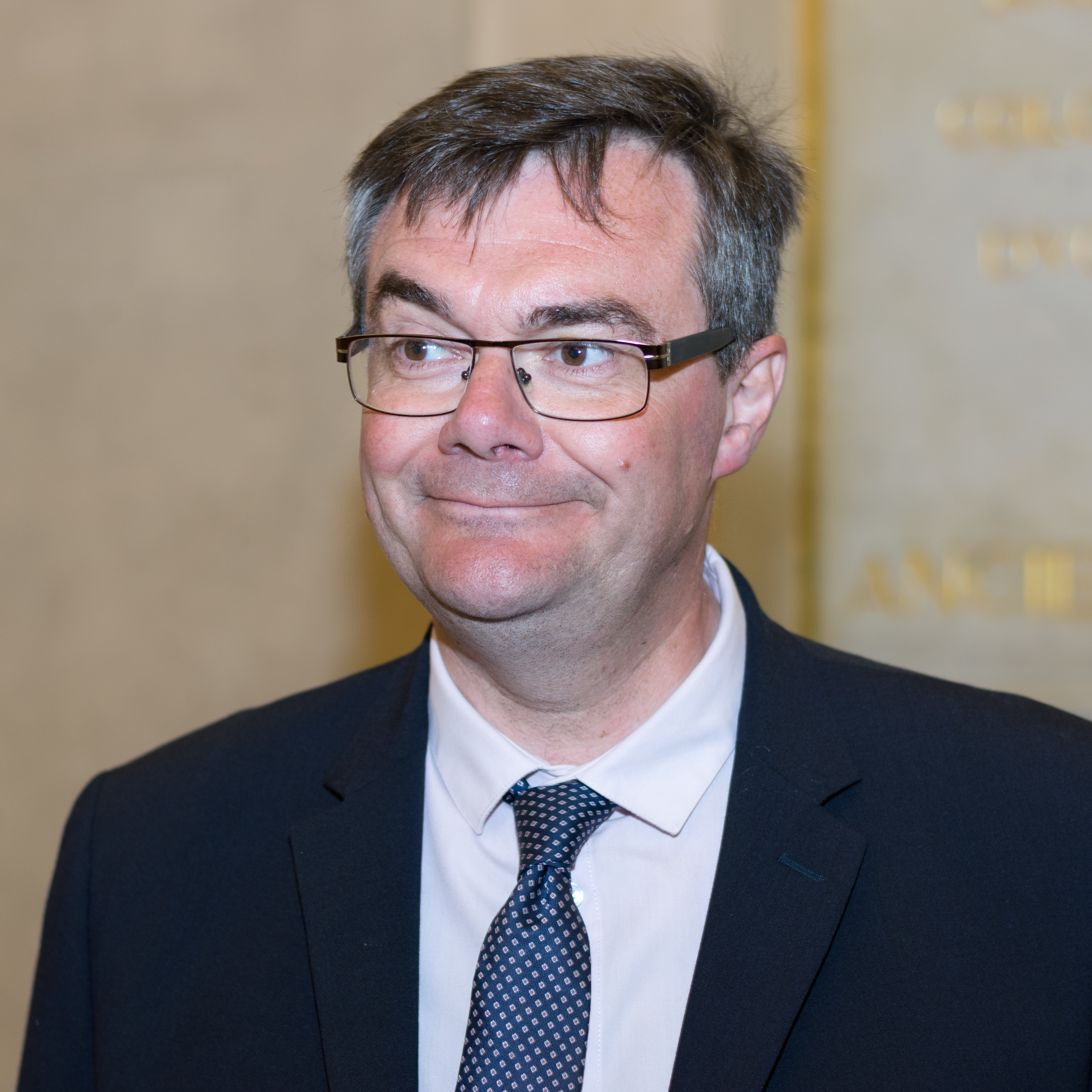

Member of the National Assembly for Saône-et-Loire's 3rd constituency
- In office 21 June 2017 – 9 June 2024
- Preceded by: Philippe Baumel
- Succeeded by: Aurélien Dutremble

Mayor of Autun
- In office 25 March 2001 – 5 July 2017
- Preceded by: Didier Martinet
- Succeeded by: Vincent Chauvet

Personal details
- Born: 27 March 1966 (age 60) Autun, France
- Party: Renaissance (since 2017); Territories of Progress (since 2020)
- Other political affiliations: Socialist Party (until 2012); Cap21 (2014–2017)
- Education: Sciences Po; Panthéon-Sorbonne University
- Occupation: Teacher

Rémy Rebeyrotte (French pronunciation: [ʁemi ʁəbeʁɔt]; born 27 March 1966) is a French teacher and politician who represented the 3rd constituency of the Saône-et-Loire department in the National Assembly from 2017 to 2024. A member of Renaissance (RE, formerly La République En Marche!), which he joined after leaving the Socialist Party (PS), he previously served as Mayor of Autun from 2001 until his resignation in 2017 following his election to Parliament.

== Political career ==
Rebeyrotte was a member of the Socialist Party until 2012. He held the seat in the General Council of Saône-et-Loire for the canton of Autun-Sud from 1994 to 2015, as well as the mayorship of Autun from 2001 to 2017.

In the 2012 legislative election, he unsuccessfully ran for the National Assembly in the 3rd constituency of Saône-et-Loire, placing fourth in the first round with 7.3% of the vote. In 2017, he won election under the La République En Marche! banner, successfully winning reelection in 2022.

In Parliament, Rebeyrotte served on the Committee on Legal Affairs. In addition to his committee assignments, he was part of the French parliamentary friendship group with Burkina Faso.

When Richard Ferrand was elected President of the National Assembly in 2018, Rebeyrotte stood as a candidate to succeed him as president of the LREM parliamentary group. In an internal vote, he came in last out of seven, with 8 votes; the position went to Gilles Le Gendre instead.

On 12 July 2022, to criticise a far-right opponent, Rebeyrotte made a Nazi salute in the hemicycle of the National Assembly. He received only a simple call to order as a sanction on 25 July. The National Rally of Marine Le Pen then filed a complaint following these events against Rebeyrotte. Alongside his apology, Rebeyrotte donated €1,000 to a memorial charity.

In the 2024 snap election, he narrowly lost his seat to Aurélien Dutremble of the National Rally, placing second with a margin of 65 votes in the second round.

== Political positions ==
Rebeyrotte was one of 36 LREM members who voted against a ban of glyphosate.

== See also ==
- 2017 French legislative election
