= Georges Gruillot =

French politician (1931–2021)

France Senator from Doubs
- In office 4 September 1988 – 30 September 2008

Member of the Departmental Council of Doubs
- In office 1979–2004

Mayor of Vercel-Villedieu-le-Camp
- In office 1977–2001

Personal details
- Born: 14 August 1931
- Died: 7 March 2021 (aged 89)
- Party: RPR; UMP

Georges Gruillot (French: [ʒɔʁʒ ɡʁujo]; 14 August 1931 – 7 March 2021) was a French politician.

== Biography ==
A veterinarian by profession, Gruillot became a Senator from Doubs on 4 September 1988 after the departure of Robert Schwint for the National Assembly. He was a member of the Rally for the Republic and subsequently the Union for a Popular Movement. He retired in 2008 and became a Knight of the Legion of Honour on 1 January 2009.

Georges Gruillot died on 7 March 2021 at the age of 89.
