= Claude Jeannerot =

French politician

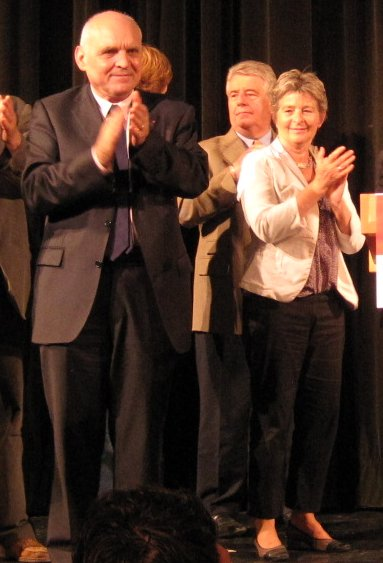
- Claude Jeannerot with Jean-Louis Fousseret et Marie-Guite Dufay
- Born: April 10, 1945 (age 80)
- Occupation: Politician

Claude Jeannerot (born April 10, 1945) was a member of the Senate of France, representing the Doubs department. He is a member of the Socialist Party.
