= Regional Council of Bourgogne-Franche-Comté =

Regional government body in France

Regional Council of Bourgogne-Franche-Comté Conseil régional de Bourgogne-Franche-Comté
- Coat of arms of Bourgogne-Franche-Comté

- Logo of Bourgogne-Franche-Comté

Type
- Type: Regional council

History
- Preceded by: Regional council of Burgundy; Regional council of Franche-Comté
- New session started: 2 July 2021

Leadership
- President: Marie-Guite Dufay, PS since 4 January 2016

Structure
- Seats: 100
- Political groups: Majority (56): Socialist Party (40) (Note: PS (28); Miscellaneous Left (8); PRG (4)); The Ecologists (8); French Communist Party (8); Opposition (44): National Rally (18) (Note: RN (16); LAF (2)); The Republicans (15) (Note: LR (12); DLF (1); MEI (1); Miscellaneous Right (1)); Renaissance (8) (Note: RE (4); Miscellaneous Centre (2); H (1); Miscellaneous Left (1)); Not Registered (3) (Note: DLF (1); H (1); LR (1))

Elections
- Voting system: Two-round list proportional representation system with majority bonus
- Last election: 20 and 27 June 2021
- Next election: 2028

Meeting place
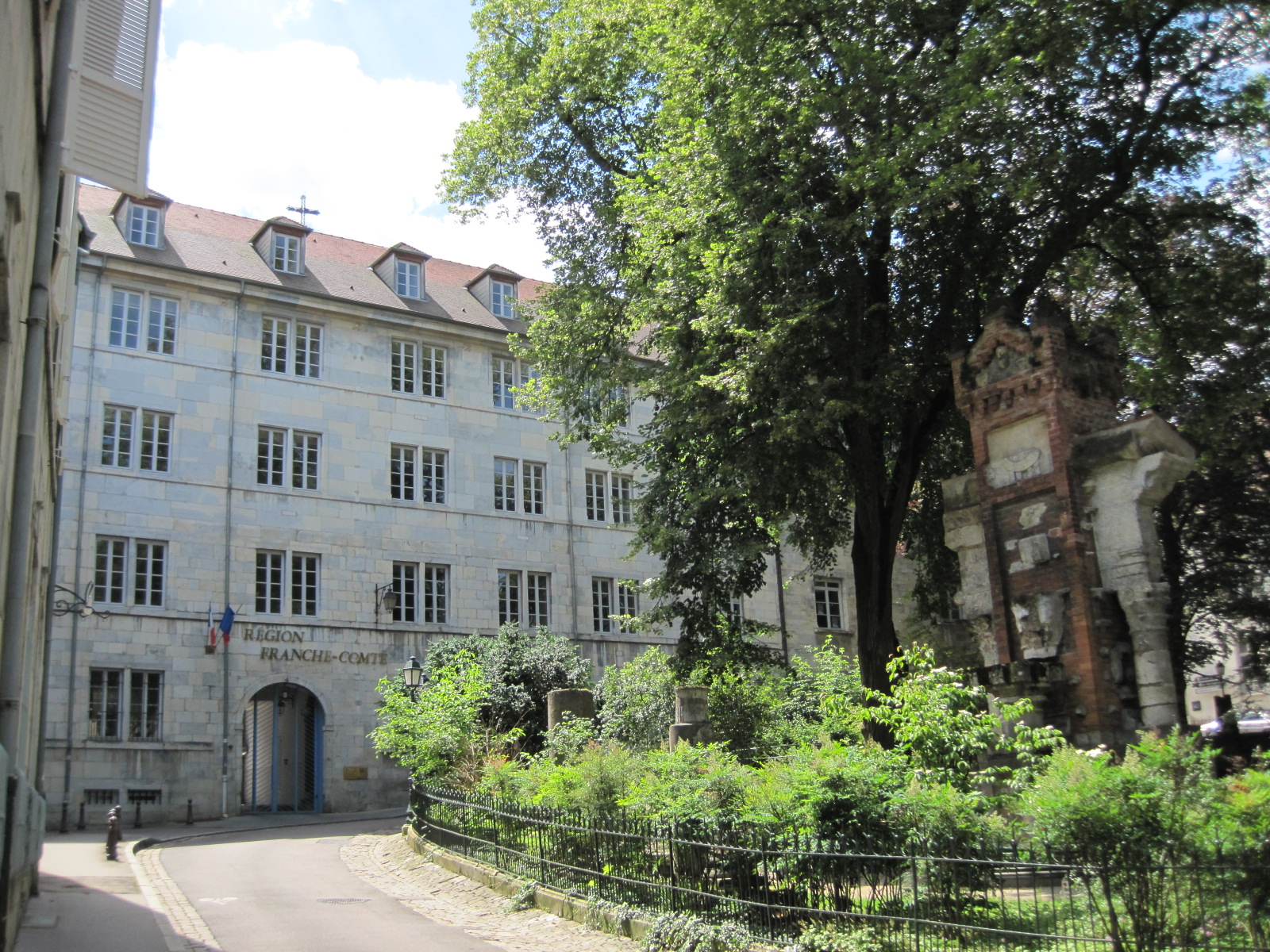
- 4 square Castan; CS 51857 – 25031 Besançon cedex

Website
- www.bourgognefranchecomte.fr

The Regional Council of Bourgogne-Franche-Comté (French: Conseil régional de Bourgogne-Franche-Comté) is the deliberative assembly of the region of Bourgogne-Franche-Comté. Marie-Guite Dufay of the Socialist Party (PS) is the current president of the regional council, elected on 4 January 2016, following the regional elections on 6 and 13 December 2015.

== History ==
The regional council of Bourgogne-Franche-Comté was created by the act on the delimitation of regions, regional and departmental elections and amending the electoral calendar of 16 January 2015, which went into effect on 1 January 2016 and merged the regional councils of Burgundy and Franche-Comté, consisting of 57 and 43 regional councillors, respectively, into a single body with 100 regional councillors, following regional elections on 6 and 13 December 2015.

== Seat ==
On 24 June 2016, the members of the Bourgogne-Franche-Comté regional council voted in favor of a proposal by Marie-Guite Dufay, president of the regional council, to designate Dijon as the prefecture of the newly unified region and agreed to select the Hôtel de Région at 4 square Castan in Besançon as the seat of the regional council. The previous seat of the regional council of Burgundy, located at 17 boulevard de la Trémouille in Dijon, became the meeting place of assemblies of the regional council. The plan was approved with 79 votes in favor, 18 votes against, and 3 abstentions.

== Election results ==
=== 2015 regional election ===
The current regional council was elected in regional elections on 6 and 13 December 2015, with the list of Marie-Guite Dufay consisting of the Socialist Party (PS), the Radical Party of the Left (PRG), and Cap21 securing an absolute majority of 51 seats.

Leader	List	First round		Second round		Seats	
Leader	List	Votes	%	Votes	%	Seats	%
Sophie Montel	FN	303,143	31.48	376,913	32.44	24	24.00
François Sauvadet	UDI–LR	231,069	24.00	382,216	32.89	25	25.00
Marie-Guite Dufay	PS–PRG–Cap21	221,376	22.99	402,916	34.67	51	51.00
Maxime Thiébaut	DLF	49,802	5.17				
Nathalie Vermorel	FG	44,471	4.62				
Cécile Prudhomme	EELV	37,707	3.92				
Christophe Grudler	MoDem	31,431	3.26				
Julien Gonzalez	AEI	20,616	2.14				
Claire Rocher	LO	14,518	1.51				
Charles-Henri Gallois	UPR	8,835	0.92				
Total		962,968	100.00	1,162,045	100.00	100	100.00
Valid votes		962,968	95.38	1,162,045	95.18		
Blank votes		27,341	2.71	28,761	2.36		
Null votes		19,252	1.91	30,056	2.46		
Turnout		1,009,561	50.56	1,220,862	61.15		
Abstentions		987,118	49.44	775,714	38.85		
Registered voters		1,996,679		1,996,576			
Source: Ministry of the Interior, Le Monde (parties)

== Composition ==
=== Political groups ===
The regional council currently consists of four political groups.

Political group	Members	Parties
My Region by heart	41	PS, PRG, DVG
Union of the Republicans of the Right and the Centre	18	LR, DLF, DVD
National Rally	18	RN
Ecologists and solidarity	8	EÉLV
Communists and Republicans	8	PCF
Group of progressive representatives	7	LREM

== Executive ==
=== Presidents ===
On 4 January 2016, Marie-Guite Dufay of the Socialist Party (PS), who presided over the regional council of Franche-Comté before its merger, was elected president of the regional council. Despite the fact the left held a majority, Dufay was not elected in the first round of the ballot, securing only 49 votes against Sophie Montel with 24 votes and 27 blank votes (the right having decided not to present a candidate), because two members of the Radical Party of the Left (PRG) withheld their support for Dufay in the first round in order to secure vice presidencies. She was subsequently elected with 51 votes in a second ballot.

Candidate	Party	First round		Second round	
Candidate	Party	Votes	%	Votes	%
Marie-Guite Dufay	PS	49	49.00	51	51.00
Sophie Montel	FN	24	24.00	24	24.00
Votes		100	100.00	100	100.00
Blank and null votes		27	27.00	25	25.00
Valid votes		73	73.00	75	75.00

=== Vice presidents ===
In addition to the president, the executive of the regional council also includes 15 vice presidents, as well as regional councillors serving as advisers on certain policy areas.

Number	Regional councillor	Group	Delegate for	Department
1st vice president	Michel Neugnot	PS	Finance, human resources, modernization of the administration, transport, travel and intermodal transport	Côte-d'Or
2nd vice president	Laurence Fluttaz	PS	Culture and heritage	Saône-et-Loire
3rd vice president	Eric Houlley	PS	Territorial cohesion and parks	Haute-Saône
4th vice president	Frédérique Colas	PS	Ecological transition and the environment	Yonne
5th vice president	Patrick Molinoz	PS	Youth, associative life, laïcité, innovation and digital development of territories	Côte-d'Or
6th vice president	Maude Clavequin	PS	Higher education, research and university, and evaluation	Territoire de Belfort
7th vice president	Jean-Claude Lagrange	PS	Economic development, new growth and employment	Saône-et-Loire
8th vice president	Océane Charret-Godard	PS	Continuing education, economic change, territorial social dialogue and guidance	Côte-d'Or
9th vice president	Sylvain Mathieu	PS	Wood, forest and mountain	Nièvre
10th vice president	Laëtitia Martinez	PS	Sport, equality and citizenship	Saône-et-Loire
11th vice president	Patrick Ayache	PS	European and international action, the planning contract, attractiveness, tourism and export	Doubs
12th vice president	Sophie Fonquernie	PS	Agriculture, viticulture and agribusiness	Doubs
13th vice president	Stéphane Guiguet	PS	Lycées and apprenticeships	Saône-et-Loire
14th vice president	Valérie Depierre	PS	Health and social facilities, disabled people	Jura
15th vice president	Denis Hameau	PS	Social and solidarity economy	Côte-d'Or

== Committees ==
The regional council includes 5 thematic committees responsible for examining files on policy areas and submitting their deliberations to the vote of the 33-member standing committee or a plenary session.

Committee	President	Group	Department
Finance, citizenship and evaluation of public policies, European funds, planning contract, human resources, general administration and communication	Alain Joyandet	LR–UDI	Haute-Saône
Economic development for employment, social and solidarity economy, agriculture, wood, forestry, tourism	Nathalie Leblanc	PS	Saône-et-Loire
Apprenticeship and vocational training, health and social, lycées, higher education, research	Muriel Verges-Caullet	PS	Yonne
Development of territories, transport, travel, intermodal transport, ecology, energy, health, digital infrastructure, mountains, parks	Jacqueline Ferrari	PS	Jura
Culture, international relations, sport, youth and associative life, laïcité, fight against discrimination, gender equality	Pascale Massicot	PS	Nièvre
