= Sophie Montel =

French politician (born 1969)

Sophie Montel MEP
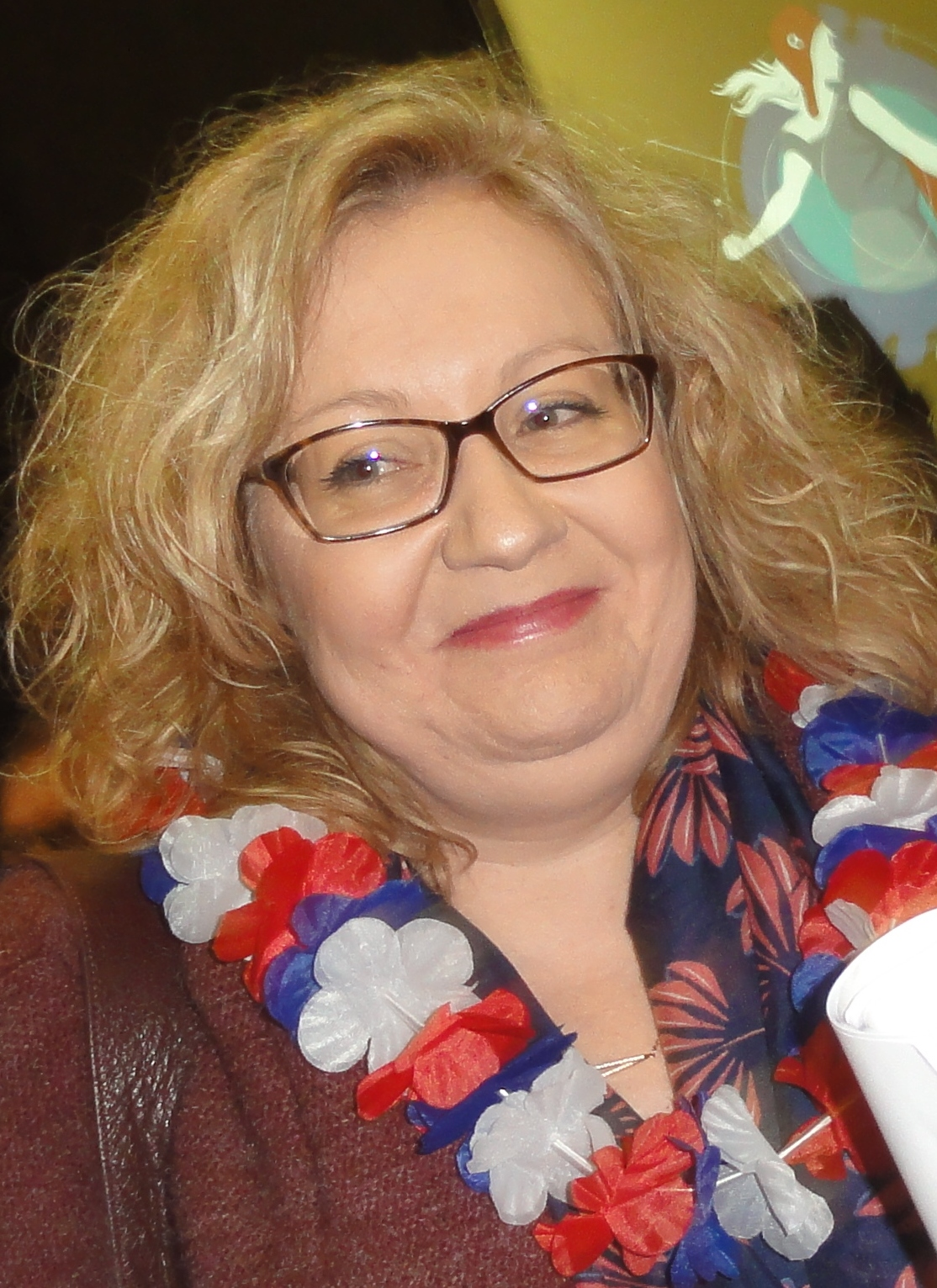
- Sophie Montel in 2018.

Member of the European Parliament
- Incumbent
- Assumed office 1 July 2014
- Constituency: East France

Regional Councillor of Franche-Comté
- Incumbent
- Assumed office 1998

Personal details
- Born: 22 November 1969 (age 56) Montbéliard, Doubs
- Party: National Front (FN)

Sophie Montel (born 22 November 1969 in Montbéliard) is a French politician.

Member of the Franche-Comté Regional Council and later regional council of Bourgogne-Franche-Comté since 1998.

She contested the 2018 Territoire de Belfort's 1st constituency by-election, but came in 8th place in the first round.

In 2014, she was elected to the European Parliament.
