= Regional council (France) =

Elected assembly of a French region

Political party of the presidents of the regional councils after the 2021 election: Socialist Party (PS) Miscellaneous left (DVG) The Republicans (LR) The Centrists (LC) Miscellaneous right (DVD) Regionalist parties (REG)

A regional council (French: conseil régional) is the elected assembly of a region of France.

== History ==
Regional councils were created by law on 5 July 1972. Originally they were simply consultative bodies consisting of the region's parliamentary representatives plus an equal number of members nominated by the departments and communes.

The decentralisation programme of 1982–1983 under President François Mitterrand provided for direct election which began in 1986 and increased the powers of the councils.

== Operation ==
The assemblies elect their presidents who preside over the meetings and head the regional executive.

== Electoral system ==
=== Before 2004 ===
Between 1986 and 2004, regional councils were elected by closed list proportional representation. The Front National was frequently left with the balance of power as a result and this led to a change in the electoral law.

=== Since 2004 ===
Since 2004 three quarters of the seats continue to be elected by proportional representation with each list having an equal number of male and female candidates. The other quarter are given to the list that received the most votes. In order to gain these top up seats, a list must have gained an absolute majority of the votes in the first round. If this has not been achieved a second round is held with each party that gained at least ten percent of the votes competing. The party that wins a plurality in this round gains the bonus seats. It is common in this round for lower ranking parties to withdraw in favour of parties they have entered into an alliance with.

This can however potentially mean that a list that gained fewer votes in the first round and thus fewer proportional seats can end up the overall winner.

== List of councils ==
=== Current councils ===
- Regional Council of Auvergne-Rhône-Alpes
- Regional Council of Bourgogne-Franche-Comté
- Regional Council of Brittany
- Regional Council of Centre-Val de Loire
- Corsican Assembly
- Regional Council of Grand Est
- Regional Council of Guadeloupe
- Regional Council of Hauts-de-France
- Regional Council of Île-de-France
- Regional Council of Normandy
- Regional Council of Nouvelle-Aquitaine
- Regional Council of Occitania
- Regional Council of Pays de la Loire
- Regional Council of Provence-Alpes-Côte d'Azur
- Regional Council of Réunion

=== Former councils ===
The following councils were disbanded after the merger of regions which came in effect since 1 January 2016:

- Regional Council of Alsace
- Regional Council of Aquitaine
- Regional Council of Auvergne
- Regional Council of Burgundy
- Regional Council of Champagne-Ardenne
- Regional Council of Franche-Comté
- Regional Council of Languedoc-Roussillon
- Regional Council of Limousin
- Regional Council of Lorraine
- Regional Council of Midi-Pyrénées
- Regional Council of Nord-Pas-de-Calais
- Regional Council of Lower Normandy
- Regional Council of Upper Normandy
- Regional Council of Picardy
- Regional Council of Poitou-Charentes
- Regional Council of Rhône-Alpes
