= Martial Bourquin =

French politician

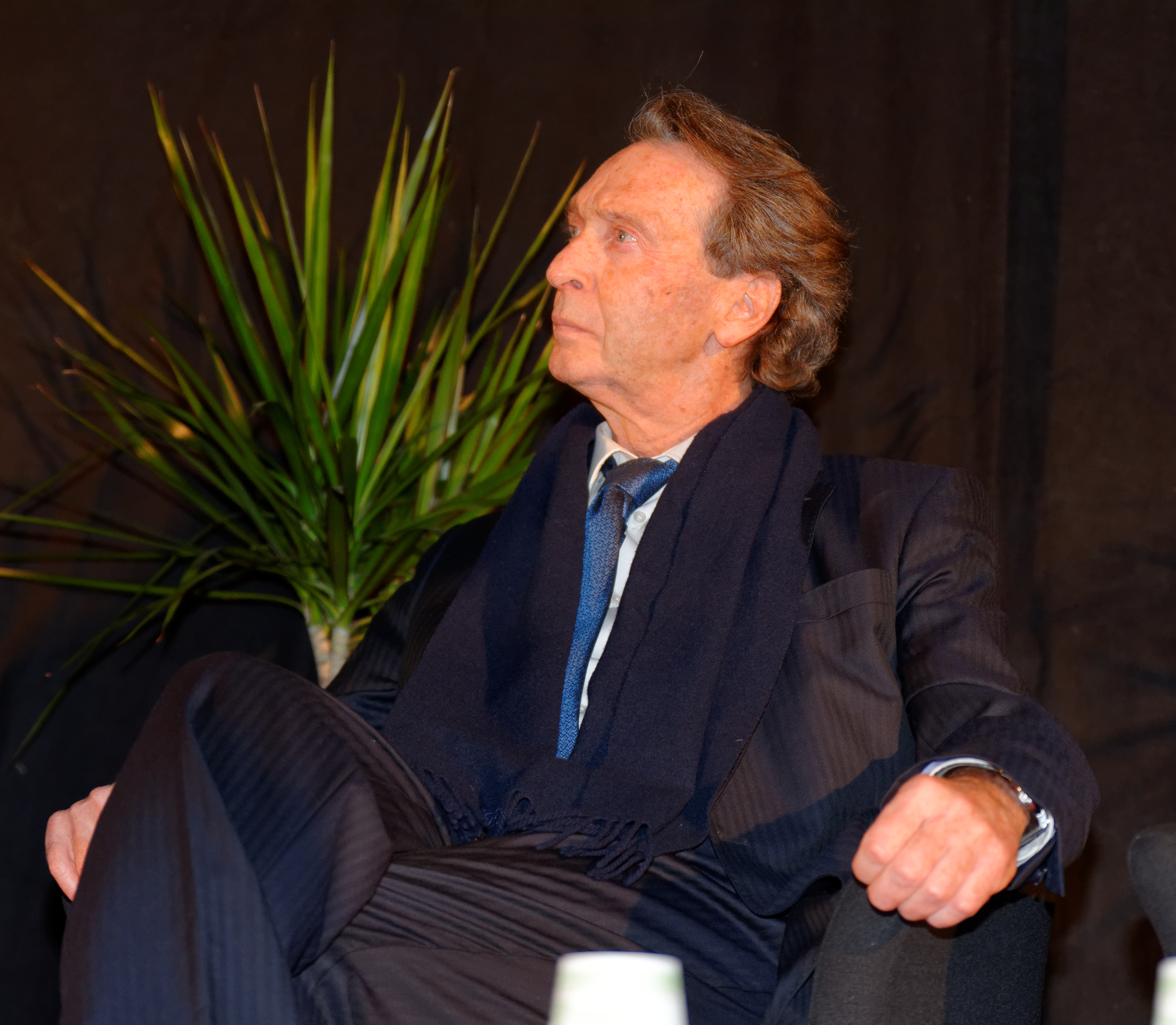
Image of Martial Bourquin

Martial Bourquin (born 23 July 1952) is a member of the Senate of France, representing the Doubs department, and he is a municipal councillor for the city of Aundincourt. He is a member of the Socialist Party.
