= André Billardon =

French socialist

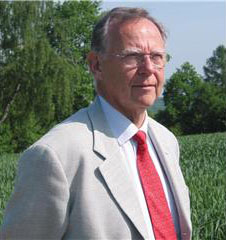

André Billardon (born 22 October 1940) is a French politician and member of the Socialist Party. He is the current mayor of Le Creusot and used to be a Minister during Pierre Bérégovoy's term of office, while François Mitterrand was president. Billardon was a mathematics teacher prior to his involvement in local politics in the third circonscription of Saône-et-Loire. Thus, he was elected as a député for the first time in 1978. He was then re-elected in every legislative election until 1992. He was then appointed Minister for the Energy. He carried out his duties from October 1992 to March 1993. He was again elected as a député in June 1997, until May 2002. He also used to be the chairman of the Communauté Urbaine Le Creusot – Montceau.
