= Raymond Forni =

French politician (1941–2008)

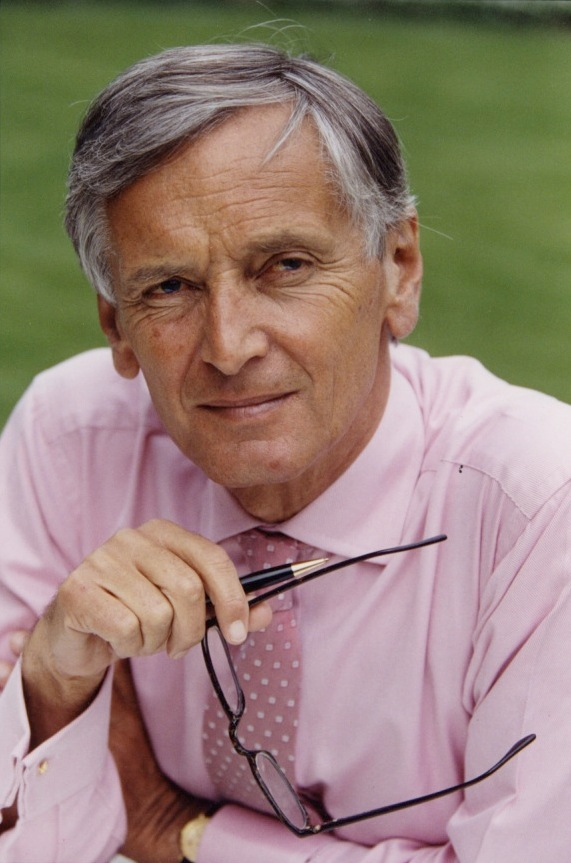
- Forni in 2001

President of the National Assembly
- In office 29 March 2000 – 18 June 2002
- President: Jacques Chirac
- Preceded by: Laurent Fabius
- Succeeded by: Jean-Louis Debré

President of Franche-Comté
- In office 2 April 2004 – 5 January 2008
- Deputy: Marie-Marguerite Dufay
- Preceded by: Jean-François Humbert
- Succeeded by: Marie-Marguerite Dufay

Personal details
- Born: 20 May 1941 Belfort, France
- Died: 5 January 2008 (aged 66) Paris, France
- Cause of death: Leukemia
- Party: Socialist Party
- Education: University of Strasbourg

Raymond Forni (French pronunciation: [ʁɛmɔ̃ fɔʁni]; 20 May 1941 – 5 January 2008) was a French Socialist politician.

== Biography ==
The son of an Italian immigrant from Piedmont, Forni was born in Belfort, in 1941. His father died when he was 11. At 17, he had to stop studying, and he started to work as an unskilled worker in Peugeot factories. He finally graduated from high school at 21 and started law studies at the University of Strasbourg. He became a lawyer at the age of 27 years.

Member of the Socialist Party, his political career started in 1971 when he became municipal council. In 1973, he was elected as deputy of Territoire de Belfort département. He got reelected four times consecutively, until 2002. He was President of the National Assembly from 2000 to 2002. He was president of the Franche-Comté regional council from 2 April 2004, until his death.

He died in Paris on 5 January 2008, at the age of 66, of leukaemia. He was married twice and had five sons.

He was awarded Grand Cross of the Order of Merit of the Republic of Poland (2000).

== Political career ==
National Assembly of France

- President of the National Assembly of France: 2000-2002.
- Vice President of the National Assembly: 1991-1993/1998-2000.
- President of Law Committee in the National Assembly: 1981-1985.
- Member of the National Assembly of France for Territoire de Belfort (1st constituency): 1973-1985 (Resignation)/1988-1993/1997-2002.

Regional Council

- President of the Regional Council of Franche-Comté : 2004-2008 (died 2008)
- Regional councillor of Franche-Comté: 2004-2008.

General Council

- General councillor of the Territoire de Belfort : 1976-1982/1987-2001. Elected in 1976, reelected in 1987, 1988, 1994.

Municipal Council

- Mayor of Delle: 1991-2004 (Resignation).
- 1st deputy-mayor of Delle: 1989-91/2004-08 (died 2008)
- Municipal councillor of Delle: 1989-2008 (died 2008)
- Municipal councillor of Montreux-Château (1971–77)
- Municipal councillor of Fontaine: 1983-89

== Bibliography ==
Un enfant de la République (a son of the Republic), in 2002 (ISBN 2-234-05458-3)

Political offices
Preceded by Laurent Fabius	President of the National Assembly; 2000-2002	Succeeded by Jean-Louis Debré
Preceded by Jean-François Humbert	President of Franche-Comté; 2004-2008	Succeeded by Marie-Marguerite Dufay
