= Marie-Guite Dufay =

French politician (born 1949)

Marie-Marguerite Dufay
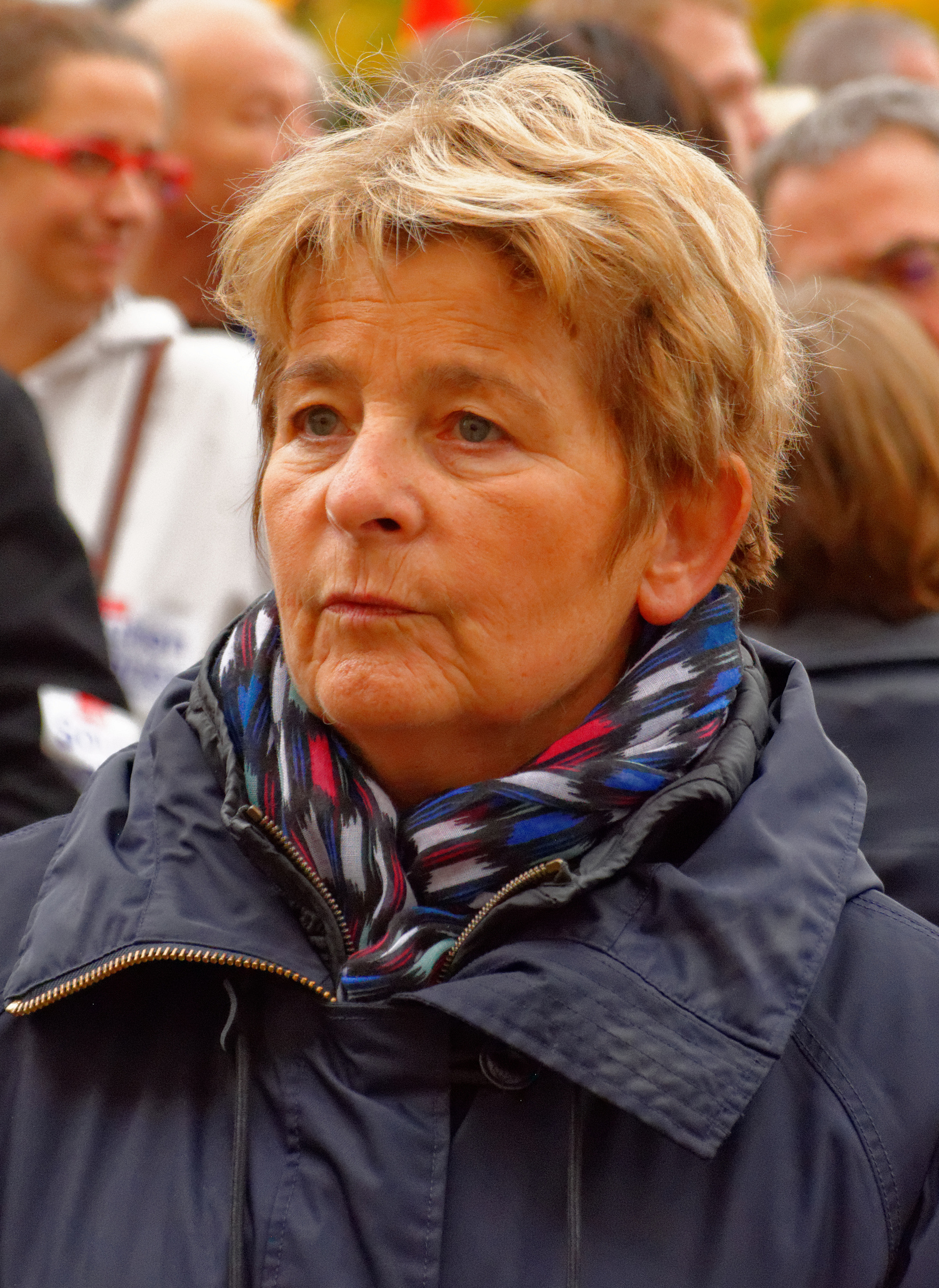
- Dufay in 2019

7th President of Franche-Comté
- Incumbent
- Assumed office 24 January 2008
- Deputy: Joseph Parrenin
- In office 5 January 2008 – 24 January 2008 (as Acting President)
- Preceded by: Raymond Forni

First Vice President of Franche-Comté
- In office 2 April 2004 – 24 January 2008
- President: Raymond Forni
- Succeeded by: Joseph Parrenin

Regional Councillor from Doubs
- Incumbent
- Assumed office 2 April 2004

Personal details
- Born: 21 May 1949 (age 77) Paris, Île-de-France, France
- Party: Socialist Party

Marie-Marguerite Dufay (French pronunciation: [maʁi maʁɡəʁit dyfɛ]), best known as Marie-Guite Dufay (French pronunciation: [maʁi ɡit dyfɛ]; born 21 May 1949), is a French politician of the Socialist Party (PS) who serves as president of the regional council of Bourgogne-Franche-Comté.

== Political career ==
Dufay was first elected to the Besançon city council in 1989. Six years later, she was appointed as deputy mayor of Besançon (1995 to 2008). In the 2004 Franche-Comté regional election, she was second in the Socialist List just after Raymond Forni. After the death of President Raymond Forni, she was elected by the assembly as President of the Region. She won the nomination to be the next socialist candidate for President of Franche-Comté in 2010.

In the Socialist Party's 2011 primaries, Dufay endorsed Martine Aubry as the party's candidate for the 2012 presidential election.

Ahead of the 2017 presidential election, Dufay endorsed Emmanuel Macron.

| Preceded by Raymond Forni | President of the Franche-Comté; Regional Council; 2008 – | Succeeded by Incumbent |
Party political offices
| Preceded by Raymond Forni | Socialist Party nominee for President of Franche Comté; 2010 | Succeeded by current nominee |
| Preceded by Paulette Guinchard-Kunstler | Socialist Party nominee for Doubs's 2nd district 2007 (lost) | Succeeded by Éric Alauzet (EÉLV) |
