= Regional Council of Franche-Comté =

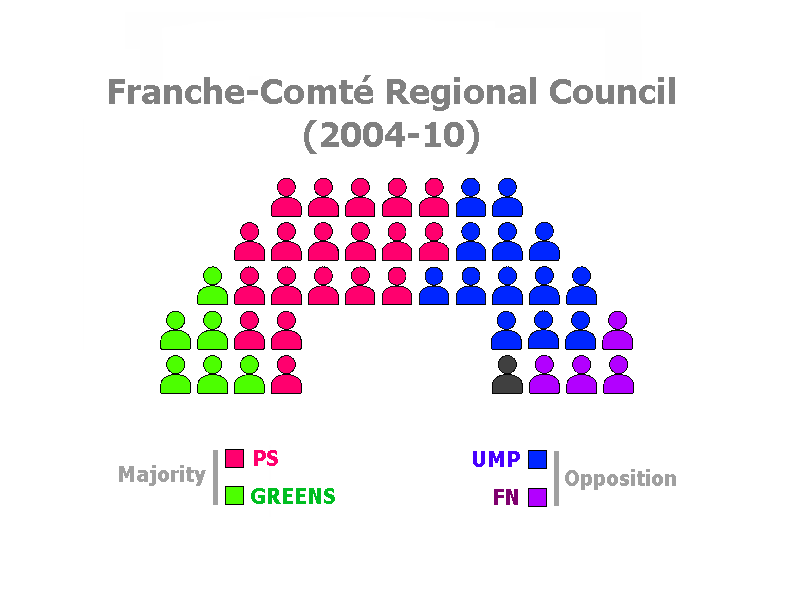
The current composition of Regional Council follow previous elections

The Regional Council of Franche-Comté was the regional council of Franche-Comté (France). It was chaired by Marie-Marguerite Dufay until its merger to form the Regional Council of Bourgogne-Franche-Comté.

== Seats ==
=== By department ===
- 19 councillors for Doubs
- 10 councillors for Jura
- 10 councillors for Haute-Saône
- 4 councillors for Territoire de Belfort

=== By party ===
Party		seats
•	Socialist Party	16
	Union for a Popular Movement	12
•	The Greens	6
	National Front	5
•	Miscellaneous Left	3
•	Association for a Republican Left	1

== Elections ==
- 2004 Franche-Comté regional election
- 2010 Franche-Comté regional election

=== Former presidents ===
- List of presidents of the Regional Council of Franche-Comté
