= 2020 French municipal elections =

- 15 March 2020 (1st round); 28 June 2020 (2nd round)

The 2020 French municipal elections were held from 15 March to 28 June to renew the municipal councils of the approximately 35,000 French communes. The first round took place on 15 March and the second round was postponed to 28 June due to the COVID-19 pandemic.

== Electoral system ==
Municipal elections in France result in the renewal of the members of municipal councils in every commune, and are held every 6 years. With the exception of Paris, Lyon, and Marseille, the electoral subdivision is the commune itself. In Paris, separate elections are held for each arrondissement, as is the case in Lyon, where elections are also held by arrondissement; in Marseille, elections are held within sectors containing two arrondissements each.

Election is open to European citizens living in the country, but since 2020, 800 English/British people have lost their electoral capacities due to Brexit.

The number of municipal councillors within each commune is dependent upon its population, from a minimum of 7 for communes with a population less than 100 to 69 for those with a population of 300,000 or more (with the exception of the three largest cities). The electoral system within each commune is also dependent on its population.

In communes with fewer than 1,000 inhabitants, two-round majority-at-large voting with panachage is used, with candidates elected in the first round should they receive an absolute majority of votes cast and at least a quarter of the number of individuals registered on the electoral rolls. The remaining seats are filled in the second round, in which only a plurality of votes is required to be elected. The requirement for gender parity is also void in these smaller communes.

In communes with 1,000 or more inhabitants, electoral lists contest a two-round proportional representation system with a majority bonus. Should a list receive an absolute majority of votes cast in the first round, it will receive half of all seats and the rest of the seats will be distributed proportionally among electoral lists with at least 5% of votes using the D'Hondt method. If a second round is necessitated, only lists which received at least 10% of valid votes in the first round proceed, and may merge with other lists which received at least 5% of votes cast in the first round. Seats are then allocated using the same method as the first round, guaranteeing a majority for the list with a relative majority of votes.

In the three largest cities, the election of municipal councils and arrondissement councils takes place simultaneously, and follow the same electoral method as that for communes with 1,000 or more inhabitants within each electoral division (whether arrondissement or sector). Mayors are elected in a two-round secret ballot requiring an absolute majority, and otherwise with a plurality of votes from municipal councillors if a third round is required.

The election of councillors to intercommunal structures also takes place concurrently with the municipal elections; in communes with fewer than 1,000 inhabitants, they are chosen "in the order of the table" (mayors, deputy mayors, and councillors), while in larger communes, they are elected simultaneously.

The number of municipal councillors elected in each commune is determined as a function of its population, ranging from 7 to 69 in all communes except for the three largest cities.

Population	<100	<500	<1,500	<2,500	<3,500	<5,000	<10,000	<20,000	<30,000	<40,000	<50,000
Municipal councillors	7	11	15	19	23	27	29	33	35	39	43
Population	<60,000	<80,000	<100,000	<150,000	<200,000	<250,000	<300,000	>300,000	Lyon	Marseille	Paris
Municipal councillors	45	49	53	55	59	61	65	69	73	101	163

== Opinion polls ==
=== National ===
The Harris Interactive poll was based on communes with a population of at least 10,000.

Polling firm	Fieldwork date	Sample size	Abs.	LO	NPA	PCF	FI	G.s	PS	EELV	DVG	LREM	MoDem	UDI	LR	DVD	DLF	RN	LP	DIV
Odoxa	22–23 January 2020	1,002	25%	–	–	–	7%	–	11%	13.5%	–	18%	–	–	13.5%	–	–	14%	–	19%
Harris Interactive	22 May–7 Jun 2018	1,674	–	2%		9%		2%	19%			27%		5%	18%		5%	13%	<0.5%	–
2014 election	23 Mar 2014	–	36.45%	0.60%		3.13%		–	18.01%	1.16%	15.88%	–	0.97%	2.33%	18.51%	24.57%	(DVD)	4.76%	–	10.09%

=== By commune ===
==== Bordeaux ====
The April 2018 and May 2019 Ifop polls were commissioned by Esprit Bordeaux, an association founded by supporters of Alain Juppé, later backing Nicolas Florian.

Polling firm	Fieldwork date	Sample size	Prud'homme LFI	Darchy LFI	Rouveyre PS	Hurmic EELV	Feltesse DVG	Cazenave LREM	Fabre LREM	Florian LR	Juppé DVD	Jay RN	Colombier RN	Others
Ifop	9–13 May 2019	600	13%	–	7%	14%	8%	8%	–	45%	–	5%	–	<0.5%
Ifop	20–28 Apr 2018	800	–	10%	10%	9%	9%	–	9%	–	51%	–	2%	–
Ifop	20–28 Apr 2018	800	–	10%	11%	9%	9%	–	56% (Juppé)			–	5%	–
2014 election	23 Mar 2014	–	4.59%		22.58% (Feltesse)			–	–	–	60.94%	–	6.06%	5.81%

==== Lille ====
===== First round =====
The March 2019 OpinionWay poll was sponsored by The Republicans, while La République En Marche! commissioned the BVA poll conducted in October 2018, which did not specify a specific LR candidate.

Polling firm	Fieldwork date	Sample size	EXG	Bocquet PCF	Quatennens LFI	Aubry PS	Baly EELV	Spillebout LREM	Petit LREM	Darmanin LREM	Castelain DVD	Daubresse LR	Cattelin-Denu RN	Others
OpinionWay	Mar 2019	836	–	–	14%	22%	–	5%	11%	–	–	18%	–	–
BVA	15–20 Oct 2018	699	<0.5%	3%	10%	15%	16%	–	–	17%	7%	14%	17%	–
2014 election	23 Mar 2014	–	6.12%	6.16%		34.85%	11.08%	–	–	–	–	22.73%	17.15%	1.87%

===== Second round =====
Polling firm	Fieldwork date	Sample size	Quatennens LFI	Aubry PS	Darmanin LREM	Daubresse LR	Cattelin-Denu RN
BVA	15–20 Oct 2018	699	–	41%	37%	–	22%
BVA	15–20 Oct 2018	699	14%	26%	38%	–	22%
2014 election	30 Mar 2014	–	–	52.05%	–	29.71%	18.22%

==== Lyon ====
Polling firm	Fieldwork date	Sample size	Perrin-Gilbert LFI	Doucet EELV	Runel PS	Collomb LREM	Képénékian LREM	Kimelfeld LREM	Blanc LR	Marion RN
Ifop-Fiducial	28 Sep–3 Oct 2018	802	14%	16%	10%	31%	–	–	18%	11%
Ifop-Fiducial	28 Sep–3 Oct 2018	802	14%	17%	11%	–	28%	–	19%	11%
Ifop-Fiducial	28 Sep–3 Oct 2018	802	15%	17%	11%	–	–	27%	19%	11%
2014 election	23 Mar 2014	–	7.56%	8.90%	35.76% (Collomb)		–	–	30.49%	12.19%

==== Marseille ====
The February 2019 Ifop poll was commissioned by Génération engagement, the financing association of Bruno Gilles, the PollingVox polls by l'Association des Amis de Martine Vassal (with Bruno Gilles as a miscellaneous right candidate in June 2019), and the February 2018 Ifop poll by Cap sur l'avenir 13, the micro-party of Renaud Muselier.

Polling firm	Fieldwork date	Sample size	Coppola PCF	Camard LFI	Mélenchon LFI	Payan PS	Ghali PS	Ahamada LREM	Castaner LREM	Muselier LR	Boyer LR	Vassal LR	Gilles DVD	Ravier RN	Others
PollingVox	11–15 Jun 2019	1,003	4%	14%	–	–	13%	9%	–	–	–	29%	10%	21%	–
PollingVox	11–15 Jun 2019	1,003	5%	14%	–	–	16%	39% (Vassal)						26%	–
Ifop	20–23 Feb 2019	803	4%	12%	–	–	19%	15%	–	–	–	–	27%	21%	2%
Elabe	6–12 Sep 2018	1,001	3.5%	–	19%	–	16%	–	17.5%	27.5%	–	–	–	16.5%	–
Elabe	6–12 Sep 2018	1,001	3.5%	–	19%	–	14.5%	–	14%	–	–	34%	–	15%	–
PollingVox	14–18 Jun 2018	1,004	3%	–	21%	–	14%	–	17%	–	–	25%	–	20%	–
Ifop	2–5 Feb 2018	700	2%	–	21%	–	14%	–	20%	26%	–	–	–	17%	–
Ifop	2–5 Feb 2018	700	2%	–	21%	–	13%	–	22%	–	24%	–	–	18%	–
Ifop	2–5 Feb 2018	700	2%	–	22%	–	13%	–	20%	–	–	24%	–	19%	–
Ifop	2–5 Feb 2018	700	4%	–	22%	10%	44% (Muselier)				–	–	–	20%	–
2014 election	23 Mar 2014	–	7.10% (Coppola)			20.77% (Mennucci)		–	–	37.64% (Gaudin)				23.16%	11.33%

==== Marseille's 5th sector ====
The May 2019 BVA poll was commissioned by Les amis de Lionel Royer-Perreaut, the micro-party of its namesake.

Polling firm	Fieldwork date	Sample size	Cavagnera LFI	Pigamo PS	Agresti LREM	Royer-Perreaut LR	Bez RN	Others
BVA	13–22 May 2019	741	9%	18%	11%	41%	21%	–
2014 election	23 Mar 2014	–	6.07%	15.28%	–	45.77%	25.55%	7.31%

==== Montpellier ====
The March 2018 Ifop poll was commissioned by Mohed Altrad.

Polling firm	Fieldwork date	Sample size	EXG	Ressiguier LFI	Doulain LFI	Ollier ECO	Delafosse PS	Saurel DVG	Vignal LREM	Altrad DIV	Gaillard DIV	Larue LR	Francis UDI	Jamet RN	Rokvam RN	Others
Harris Interactive	7–11 Jan 2020	616	<0.5%	-	10%	19%	10%	18%	7%	10%	5%	6%	-	-	10%	5%
Ifop	27–31 Mar 2018	662	2%	17%	-	-	12%	32% (Saurel)		15%	-	8%	3%	11%	-	<0.5%
Ifop	27–31 Mar 2018	662	2%	16%	-	-	12%	29%	20% (Altrad)		-	6%	4%	11%	-	<0.5%
Ifop	2014 election	23 Mar 2014	3.18%	7.56%	-	-	22.93%	25.27%	–	–	-	22.71%	4.52%	13.80%	-	–

==== Mulhouse ====
The September 2018 OpinionWay poll was paid for by the city of Mulhouse and the outgoing majority led by Michèle Lutz.

Polling firm	Fieldwork date	Sample size	Wostyn LO	Minery EELV	Schweitzer PS	Million LREM	Lutz LR	Ritz RN
OpinionWay	24 Sep–1 Oct 2018	1,003	4%	17%	12%	10%	44%	13%
OpinionWay	24 Sep–1 Oct 2018	1,003	5%	18%	12%	50% (Lutz–Rottner)		15%
2014 election	23 Mar 2014	–	1.53%	3.05%	31.39%	–	42.16%	21.85%

==== Nancy ====
The June 2019 Ifop poll was conducted on behalf of the Socialist Party (PS).

===== First round =====
Polling firm	Fieldwork date	Sample size	Nimsgern LO	Jouira LFI	Klein PS	Maguin EELV	Hénart MR	Morano LR	Hervé DVD	Eury RN	Others
Ifop	13–15 Jun 2019	603	0.5%	8%	25%	20%	28%	8%	2%	8%	0.5%
Ifop	13–15 Jun 2019	603	<0.5%	8%	24%	20%	36% (Hénart)		3%	9%	<0.5%
Ifop	13–15 Jun 2019	603	0.5%	8%	41% (Klein)		37%		3%	10%	0.5%

===== Second round =====
Polling firm	Fieldwork date	Sample size	Klein PS	Hénart MR
Ifop	13–15 Jun 2019	603	53%	47%

==== Nanterre ====
Polling firm	Fieldwork date	Sample size	Eisenberg NPA	Morain FI	Jarry PCF	Coulondre LREM	Bedin LR	Others
Harris Interactive	18–23 Jan 2019	615	3%	7%	54%	12%	24%	–
2014 election	23 Mar 2014	–	2.77%	53.84%		–	39.65%	3.73%

==== Nantes ====
The June 2019 Ifop poll was conducted on behalf of the Socialist Party (PS).

===== First round =====
Polling firm	Fieldwork date	Sample size	Croupy LFI	Rolland PS	Laernoes EELV	Errante LREM	Garnier LR	Bouchet RN	Others
Ifop	14–17 Jun 2019	703	6%	33%	23%	14%	15%	8%	1%
Ifop	14–17 Jun 2019	703	8%	51% (Rolland)		15%	17%	8%	1%

===== Second round =====
Polling firm	Fieldwork date	Sample size	Rolland PS	Errante LREM
Ifop	14–17 Jun 2019	703	68%	32%

==== Nice ====
===== First round =====
The Ifop poll conducted in December 2017 tested a "miscellaneous right and centre of the municipal majority" list led by Christian Estrosi in the event that Éric Ciotti headed a list representing The Republicans (LR) as well as considering Robert Injey as heading a list for La France Insoumise, and was commissioned by Les Amis de Christian Estrosi.

Polling firm	Fieldwork date	Sample size	Abs.	Injey PCF	Damiano LFI	Allemand PS–EELV	Roussel LREM	Estrosi LR			Ciotti LR	Kandel CNIP	Vardon RN	Arnautu RN	Others
Ifop	3–5 Apr 2019	602	–	2%	6%	17%	6%	–	–	51%	–	–	17%	–	1%
Ifop	3–5 Apr 2019	602	–	2%	4%	15%	5%	–	35%	–	27%	–	12%	–	<0.5%
Ifop	3–5 Apr 2019	602	–	2%	4%	16%	–	–	37%	–	29%	–	11%	–	1%
Ifop	3–5 Apr 2019	602	–	2%	8%	18%	13%	–	–	–	44%	–	14%	–	1%
Ifop	3–5 Apr 2019	602	–	2%	6%	15%	6%	–	–	47%	–	6%	17%	–	1%
Elabe	18–23 Mar 2019	709	39%	2.5%	4.5%	15%	7%	–	28%	–	27%	–	16%	–	–
Elabe	18–23 Mar 2019	709	39%	2%	4.5%	15.5%	6%	–	26.5%	–	27.5%	3.5%	14.5%	–	–
Elabe	18–23 Mar 2019	709	39%	2%	4.5%	16.5%	–	32%	–	–	29%	–	16%	–	–
Elabe	18–23 Mar 2019	709	39%	2%	4.5%	16%	–	31%	–	–	27%	3%	16.5%	–	–
Ifop	4–6 Dec 2017	604	–	–	8%	10%	15%	–	–	47%	–	–	–	17%	3%
Ifop	4–6 Dec 2017	604	–	–	8%	10%	12%	–	37%	–	20%	–	–	12%	1%
Ifop	4–6 Dec 2017	604	–	–	9%	11%	–	–	40%	–	26%	–	–	12%	2%
2014 election	23 Mar 2014	–	45.82%	5.38% (Injey)		15.25%	–	–	–	44.98%	–	10.12%	4.43%	15.59%	4.22%

===== Second round =====
Polling firm	Fieldwork date	Sample size	Abs.	Allemand PS	Estrosi LR		Ciotti LR	Kandel CNIP	Vardon RN
Ifop	3–5 Apr 2019	602	–	19%	39%	–	30%	–	12%
Ifop	3–5 Apr 2019	602	–	24%	–	57%	–	–	19%
2014 election	30 Mar 2014	–	46.60%	17.84%	–	48.61%	–	12.42%	21.10%

==== Nîmes ====
===== First round =====
Polling firm	Fieldwork date	Sample size	Voinchet LFI	Bouger PCF	Cadène PS	Bouad PS	Tebib LREM	Lachaud LC	Fournier LR	Gillet RN	Others
OpinionWay	28 Mar–1 Apr 2019	502	10%	11%	10%	–	8%	18%	24%	19%	–
OpinionWay	28 Mar–1 Apr 2019	502	12%	16% (Bouad)			26% (Lachaud)		27%	19%	–
2014 election	23 Mar 2014	–	12.04%		14.73% (Dumas)		–	–	37.18%	21.77%	14.27%

===== Second round =====
Polling firm	Fieldwork date	Sample size	Bouget PCF	Bouad PS	Tebib LREM	Lachaud LC	Fournier LR	Gillet RN
OpinionWay	28 Mar–1 Apr 2019	502	28%	–	12%	–	39%	21%
OpinionWay	28 Mar–1 Apr 2019	502	–	34%	–	38%	–	28%
2014 election	30 Mar 2014	–	14.83%	13.94%	–	–	46.80%	24.41%

==== Paris ====
The March 2019 Ifop poll did not name a specific EELV candidate. The January 2019 Viavoice poll was conducted for La République En Marche!, and did not test any potential candidates other than Benjamin Griveaux. The September 2018 Ifop poll scenario including Cédric Villani was commissioned by CFHJ, owned by a friend of Villani, and the June 2019 Ifop poll was also conducted on behalf of Villani.

===== First round =====
Polling firm	Fieldwork date	Sample size	Abs.	EXG	Simonnet LFI	Gantzer PP	Hidalgo PS	Belliard EELV	Bayou EELV	Griveaux LREM	Villani DVC	Mahjoubi LREM	Renson LREM	Dati LR	Berthout LR	Bournazel Agir	Federbusch Aimer Paris	Saint-Just RN	Marcel Campion DIV	Others
Ifop	20–27 Jun 2019	951	–	1%	5%	2%	24%	14%	–	27%	–	–	–	16%	–	5%	5%	–	<0.5%	1%
Ifop	20–27 Jun 2019	951	–	1%	6%	1.5%	23%	15%	–	–	26%	–	–	15%	–	6%	5%	–	0.5%	1%
BVA	6–11 Jun 2019	1,294	–	1.5%	5%	3%	21%	13%	–	25%	–	–	–	15%	–	5%	5%	–	1%	5.5%
BVA	6–11 Jun 2019	1,294	–	1.5%	5%	3%	21%	13%	–	–	25%	–	–	15%	–	5%	5%	–	1%	5.5%
BVA	6–11 Jun 2019	1,294	–	1.5%	5%	3%	21%	13%	–	–	–	22%	–	16%	–	6%	5%	–	1%	6.5%
Elabe	28–31 Mar 2019	999	51%	1%	8.5%	4%	22%	–	9.5%	21%	–	–	–	19.5%	–	5%	4.5%	–	0.5%	4.5%
Elabe	28–31 Mar 2019	999	51%	1.5%	9%	4.5%	21.5%	–	10%	23%	–	–	–	–	15%	4%	4.5%	–	1.5%	5.5%
Elabe	28–31 Mar 2019	999	51%	2.5%	6.5%	4.5%	22%	–	7.5%	–	20%	–	–	21%	–	4.5%	4.5%	–	1.5%	5.5%
Elabe	28–31 Mar 2019	999	51%	1.5%	8.5%	3.5%	25%	–	8.5%	–	21%	–	–	–	14.5%	4.5%	5%	–	1.5%	6.5%
Elabe	28–31 Mar 2019	999	51%	1%	8.5%	4.5%	21%	–	10.5%	–	–	14%	–	23%	–	5%	5%	–	1.5%	6%
Elabe	28–31 Mar 2019	999	51%	1%	8%	6.5%	22%	–	10%	–	–	17.5%	–	–	16.5%	5.5%	4.5%	–	1.5%	7%
Ifop-Fiducial	14–21 Mar 2019	956	–	1%	8%	3%	24%	–	10%	22%	–	–	–	16%	–	7%	–	6%	1%	2%
Ifop-Fiducial	14–21 Mar 2019	956	–	1%	8%	4.5%	25%	–	10%	23%	–	–	–	–	14%	4.5%	–	7%	1%	2%
Ifop-Fiducial	14–21 Mar 2019	956	–	1%	8%	5%	24%	–	10%	–	20%	–	–	15%	–	6%	–	6.5%	1%	3.5%
Ifop-Fiducial	14–21 Mar 2019	956	–	1%	8%	5%	23%	–	11%	–	–	20%	–	15%	–	7%	–	6%	1%	3%
Viavoice	7–25 Jan 2019	2,037	–	3%	8%	–	24%	–	13%	28%	–	–	–	–	17%	–	–	4%	–	3%
Ifop	12–14 Sep 2018	944	–	1%	7%	4%	23%	–	9%	23%	–	–	–	–	21%	–	–	6%	2%	4%
Ifop	12–14 Sep 2018	944	–	2%	7%	5%	24%	–	8%	–	–	20%	–	–	23%	–	–	6%	1%	4%
Ifop	12–14 Sep 2018	944	–	2%	7%	5%	25%	–	11%	–	–	–	17%	–	22%	–	–	6%	1%	4%
Ifop	12–14 Sep 2018	944	–	1%	8%	4%	23%	–	9%	–	23%	–	–	–	21%	–	–	6%	1%	4%
Ifop-Fiducial	19–22 Mar 2018	973	–	1%	11%	–	29% (Hidalgo)			32%	–	–	–	–	21%	–	–	6%	–	–
Ifop-Fiducial	19–22 Mar 2018	973	–	2%	12%	–	41% (Hidalgo)							–	38%	–	–	7%	–	–
Ifop-Fiducial	19–22 Mar 2018	973	–	2%	12%	–	39% (Hidalgo)			40% (Berthout)						–	–	7%	–	–
2014 election	23 Mar 2014	–	43.73%	1.10%	4.94%	–	34.40%	8.86%		–	–	–	–	35.91%		–	–	6.26%	–	8.79%

===== Second round =====
Polling firm	Fieldwork date	Sample size	Hidalgo PS	Griveaux LREM	Villani DVC	Dati LR
Ifop	20–27 Jun 2019	951	51%	49%	–	–
Ifop	20–27 Jun 2019	951	49%	–	51%	–
2014 election	30 Mar 2014	–	53.33%	–	–	44.06%

==== Perpignan ====
Polling firm	Fieldwork date	Sample size	EXG	Assens FI	Fiter PCF	Neuville PS	Langevine EELV	Ripoull DIV	Grau LREM	Pujol LR	Amiel LR	Aliot RN	Others
Ifop	15–20 Mar 2019	703	1%	5%	5%	12%	5%	9%	16%	16%	–	29%	2%
Ifop	15–20 Mar 2019	703	2%	6%	4%	11%	9%	9%	17%	–	13%	27%	2%
Ifop	15–20 Mar 2019	703	1%	5%	3%	13%	8%	11%	27% (Pujol)			29%	3%
2014 election	23 Mar 2014	–	3.26%	–	11.87% (Cresta)		5.66%	9.62%	–	30.67%	–	34.18%	4.72%

==== Toulon ====
Polling firm	Fieldwork date	Sample size	Abs.	Defrance LO	de Ubeda PCF	Léandri LFI	Driquez PS	Rebec EELV	Lesage AEI	Muschotti LREM	Maginot AC	Falco LR	Perrot DLF	Navaranne RN	Michel EXD
Elabe	18–23 Mar 2019	706	37%	1%	2%	3.5%	4%	5.5%	2%	4.5%	0.5%	57%	2.5%	15%	2.5%
2014 election	23 Mar 2014	–	47.78%	0.81%	4.01% (de Ubeda)		10.11% (Alfonsi)		3.05%	–	–	59.26%	–	20.47%	2.26%

==== Toulouse ====
Polling firm	Fieldwork date	Sample size	Abs.	EXG	Bompard LFI	Sellin LFI	Raynal PS	Pellefigue UNE	Maurice EELV	Nogal LREM	Portarrieu LREM	Moudenc LR	Lamotte RN	Others
BVA	6–9 May 2019	671	41%	2%	10%	–	12%	5%	16%	8%	–	36%	8%	3%
BVA	6–9 May 2019	671	41%	2%	11%	–	13%	5%	16%	40% (Moudenc)			9%	4%
Ifop	12–17 Apr 2019	608	–	1%	–	11%	15%	6%	14%	–	9%	36%	7%	1%
2014 election	23 Mar 2014	–	47.78%	2.30%	5.10%		32.26%	–	6.98%	–	–	38.19%	8.15%	7.00%

== 2019 European elections in communes with at least 100,000 inhabitants ==
Commune	Mayor	RN		LREM–MoDem		EELV		LR–LC		FI		PS–PP–ND		DLF–CNIP		G.s		UDI		PCF		PA		GE–MEI–MdP		UPR		LO		LP		AJ		Others		T/o
Commune	Mayor	#	%	#	%	#	%	#	%	#	%	#	%	#	%	#	%	#	%	#	%	#	%	#	%	#	%	#	%	#	%	#	%	#	%	T/o
Aix-en-Provence	LR	7,644	17.64	12,605	29.10	7,311	16.88	4,396	10.15	2,420	5.59	2,505	5.78	899	2.08	1,080	2.49	893	2.06	769	1.78	669	1.54	754	1.74	523	1.21	137	0.32	154	0.36	156	0.36	407	0.94	49.78
Amiens	UDI	6,647	20.48	8,296	25.56	4,116	12.68	1,799	5.54	3,410	10.51	1,676	5.16	829	2.55	1,229	3.79	848	2.61	878	2.71	852	2.63	651	2.01	341	1.05	230	0.71	187	0.58	118	0.36	346	1.07	46.92
Angers	DVD	5,217	11.95	12,299	28.16	8,243	18.88	4,293	9.83	2,176	4.98	3,565	8.16	879	2.01	1,961	4.49	1,117	2.56	815	1.87	765	1.75	912	2.09	439	1.01	318	0.73	68	0.16	161	0.37	441	1.01	50.29
Annecy	UDI	5,663	14.13	11,670	29.11	7,719	19.25	3,969	9.90	1,677	4.18	2,592	6.47	1,083	2.70	1,066	2.66	999	2.49	540	1.35	672	1.68	920	2.29	443	1.10	196	0.49	178	0.44	149	0.37	555	1.38	51.22
Argenteuil	LR	3,393	18.34	3,822	20.66	2,192	11.85	949	5.13	2,254	12.18	1,087	5.88	494	2.67	1,159	6.27	425	2.30	727	3.93	426	2.30	419	2.26	354	1.91	222	1.20	141	0.76	94	0.51	341	1.84	36.19
Besançon	REM	4,551	14.39	7,594	24.02	5,892	18.63	2,600	8.22	2,565	8.11	2,433	7.69	663	2.10	1,288	4.07	600	1.90	907	2.87	622	1.97	722	2.28	350	1.11	236	0.75	169	0.53	120	0.38	308	0.97	48.65
Bordeaux	LR	7,167	9.40	22,476	29.47	16,434	21.55	6,879	9.02	4,725	6.20	6,481	8.50	1,017	1.33	3,214	4.21	1,363	1.79	1,617	2.12	1,064	1.40	1,501	1.97	832	1.09	335	0.44	236	0.31	209	0.27	714	0.94	51.90
Boulogne-Billancourt	LR	3,094	7.54	16,760	40.86	5,485	13.37	6,622	16.14	1,134	2.76	2,039	4.97	592	1.44	925	2.26	1,060	2.58	407	0.99	702	1.71	665	1.62	412	1.00	82	0.20	53	0.13	88	0.21	899	2.19	58.90
Brest	PS	5,931	14.83	9,297	23.24	7,370	18.43	2,534	6.34	2,927	7.32	3,591	8.98	728	1.82	2,507	6.27	767	1.92	926	2.32	621	1.55	669	1.67	468	1.17	283	0.71	102	0.26	102	0.26	1,173	2.93	49.36
Caen	LR	3,808	12.56	8,128	26.80	5,708	18.82	2,458	8.10	1,985	6.54	2,587	8.53	594	1.96	1,509	4.98	647	2.13	636	2.10	570	1.88	604	1.99	312	1.03	216	0.71	151	0.50	118	0.39	299	0.99	55.39
Clermont-Ferrand	PS	4,850	14.43	7,761	23.09	5,245	15.61	2,722	8.10	2,634	7.84	2,915	8.67	550	1.64	1,735	5.16	1,238	3.68	1,197	3.56	740	2.20	468	1.39	385	1.15	255	0.76	160	0.48	167	0.50	583	1.73	48.49
Dijon	PS	6,575	15.43	10,893	25.56	7,127	16.72	3,866	9.07	2,756	6.47	3,209	7.53	1,103	2.59	1,593	3.74	959	2.25	840	1.97	1,135	2.66	966	2.27	505	1.18	291	0.68	213	0.50	150	0.35	436	1.02	52.96
Grenoble	EELV	4,809	11.71	9,836	23.96	9,181	22.36	2,581	6.29	3,224	7.85	3,851	9.38	600	1.46	2,193	5.34	710	1.73	1,120	2.73	612	1.49	753	1.83	425	1.04	276	0.67	151	0.37	92	0.22	646	1.57	50.00
Le Havre	LR	10,063	22.55	9,592	21.50	5,810	13.02	2,319	5.20	4,094	9.18	2,510	5.63	1,153	2.58	1,144	2.56	928	2.08	2,598	5.82	1,043	2.34	623	1.40	530	1.19	301	0.67	322	0.72	224	0.50	1,366	3.06	44.78
Le Mans	PS	7,330	16.93	10,076	23.27	6,892	15.92	3,529	8.15	3,099	7.16	3,843	8.87	1,193	2.75	1,574	3.63	936	2.16	1,104	2.55	713	1.65	662	1.53	336	0.78	494	1.14	132	0.30	235	0.54	1,156	2.67	50.81
Lille	PS	7,599	13.85	12,119	22.08	11,917	21.71	2,732	4.98	5,637	10.27	4,562	8.31	788	1.44	2,768	5.04	950	1.73	1,479	2.69	1,147	2.09	1,057	1.93	639	1.16	406	0.74	245	0.45	168	0.31	671	1.22	45.82
Limoges	LR	6,586	17.53	8,548	22.75	4,816	12.82	3,537	9.41	2,839	7.56	3,701	9.85	868	2.31	1,801	4.79	698	1.86	1,276	3.40	936	2.49	632	1.68	372	0.99	328	0.87	158	0.42	211	0.56	270	0.72	52.36
Lyon	REM	15,551	10.25	43,632	28.76	31,865	21.00	15,739	10.37	8,904	5.87	11,304	7.45	2,330	1.54	5,852	3.86	3,520	2.32	3,178	2.09	2,225	1.47	3,006	1.98	1,517	1.00	726	0.48	398	0.26	312	0.21	1,668	1.10	57.32
Marseille	LR	55,974	26.31	43,803	20.59	29,120	13.69	17,583	8.26	17,521	8.23	10,993	5.17	5,161	2.43	6,452	3.03	3,041	1.43	7,285	3.42	3,141	1.48	3,644	1.71	2,819	1.32	1,005	0.47	1,314	0.62	1,008	0.47	2,920	1.37	43.79
Metz	PS	5,983	20.08	7,376	24.75	4,504	15.12	2,364	7.93	1,470	4.93	2,227	7.47	922	3.09	1,074	3.60	656	2.20	647	2.17	727	2.44	482	1.62	345	1.16	234	0.79	171	0.57	115	0.39	501	1.68	44.06
Montpellier	DVG	10,421	15.33	15,479	22.77	13,282	19.53	4,229	6.22	6,716	9.88	5,650	8.31	1,083	1.59	2,964	4.36	929	1.37	1,734	2.55	1,121	1.65	1,705	2.51	984	1.45	355	0.52	273	0.40	315	0.46	752	1.11	46.30
Montreuil	PCF	2,383	8.97	4,291	16.16	6,454	24.31	754	2.84	3,384	12.74	2,229	8.39	386	1.45	1,890	7.12	361	1.36	2,293	8.64	481	1.81	530	2.00	347	1.31	261	0.98	60	0.23	88	0.33	361	1.36	47.30
Mulhouse	LR	4,205	21.77	4,330	22.41	2,649	13.71	1,259	6.52	1,419	7.35	1,164	6.03	543	2.81	513	2.66	421	2.18	314	1.63	473	2.45	400	2.07	357	1.85	130	0.67	158	0.82	93	0.48	891	4.61	41.71
Nancy	MR	3,017	11.85	7,196	28.27	4,552	17.88	2,279	8.95	1,462	5.74	2,320	9.11	580	2.28	1,046	4.11	632	2.48	557	2.19	524	2.06	385	1.51	302	1.19	150	0.59	138	0.54	56	0.22	258	1.01	52.21
Nantes	PS	8,267	8.44	25,787	26.34	23,838	24.35	8,456	8.64	5,984	6.11	9,222	9.42	1,504	1.54	4,656	4.76	1,942	1.98	1,997	2.04	1,193	1.22	2,107	2.15	923	0.94	599	0.61	162	0.17	210	0.21	1,058	1.08	53.38
Nice	LR	28,014	28.18	21,699	21.83	11,803	11.87	11,628	11.70	4,694	4.72	4,539	4.57	3,021	3.04	1,958	1.97	1,649	1.66	2,197	2.21	2,736	2.75	1,640	1.65	1,336	1.34	279	0.28	577	0.58	390	0.39	1,257	1.26	47.78
Nîmes	LR	9,455	24.43	8,374	21.64	5,072	13.11	3,845	9.94	2,745	7.09	2,382	6.16	911	2.35	1,072	2.77	601	1.55	1,571	4.06	683	1.76	604	1.56	511	1.32	182	0.47	237	0.61	182	0.47	270	0.70	45.42
Orléans	DVD	4,116	13.82	7,925	26.61	4,859	16.32	3,090	10.38	1,482	4.98	2,215	7.44	708	2.38	1,106	3.71	1,184	3.98	679	2.28	606	2.03	565	1.90	323	1.08	176	0.59	130	0.44	99	0.33	519	1.74	48.63
Paris	PS	53,829	7.23	244,918	32.92	148,377	19.94	75,722	10.18	39,515	5.31	60,814	8.17	9,427	1.27	32,275	4.34	12,909	1.73	23,655	3.18	9,503	1.28	11,770	1.58	7,647	1.03	2,903	0.39	1,514	0.20	1,088	0.15	8,191	1.10	57.88
Perpignan	LR	8,816	30.07	5,778	19.71	3,145	10.73	2,244	7.66	2,113	7.21	1,648	5.62	781	2.66	898	3.06	450	1.54	805	2.75	664	2.27	587	2.00	385	1.31	212	0.72	271	0.92	160	0.55	357	1.22	46.40
Reims	LR	10,424	24.42	10,021	23.47	5,293	12.40	3,704	8.68	2,587	6.06	2,463	5.77	1,032	2.42	1,471	3.45	1,100	2.58	840	1.97	1,302	3.05	709	1.66	516	1.21	435	1.02	240	0.56	203	0.48	353	0.83	44.68
Rennes	PS	4,771	7.89	15,836	26.19	14,713	24.33	3,962	6.55	3,838	6.35	6,594	10.91	764	1.26	3,644	6.03	1,149	1.90	1,736	2.87	634	1.05	1,094	1.81	505	0.84	423	0.70	82	0.14	133	0.22	583	0.96	54.25
Rouen	PS	3,736	13.45	7,106	25.57	5,093	18.33	2,030	7.31	2,163	7.78	2,353	8.47	513	1.85	1,235	4.44	628	2.26	818	2.94	552	1.99	553	1.99	305	1.10	167	0.60	134	0.48	81	0.29	318	1.14	51.09
Saint-Denis (Réunion)	PS	8,455	27.12	4,287	13.75	2,789	8.95	1,496	4.80	4,510	14.47	4,160	13.34	702	2.25	884	2.84	675	2.17	529	1.70	501	1.61	607	1.95	857	2.75	308	0.99	311	1.00	10	0.03	92	0.30	32.60
Saint-Denis (Seine-Saint-Denis)	PCF	1,918	13.10	2,330	15.92	2,143	14.64	453	3.09	2,288	15.63	1,029	7.03	240	1.64	1,011	6.91	251	1.71	1,420	9.70	215	1.47	263	1.80	379	2.59	240	1.64	85	0.58	77	0.53	297	2.03	33.90
Saint-Étienne	LR	7,846	19.54	9,022	22.46	5,869	14.61	3,794	9.45	3,096	7.71	2,510	6.25	1,006	2.50	1,889	4.70	820	2.04	1,328	3.31	721	1.80	793	1.97	462	1.15	278	0.69	183	0.46	207	0.52	338	0.84	46.30
Saint-Paul	LR	5,902	28.07	2,834	13.48	2,414	11.48	1,024	4.87	4,047	19.25	984	4.68	509	2.42	492	2.34	409	1.95	380	1.81	405	1.93	467	2.22	647	3.08	227	1.08	208	0.99	22	0.10	52	0.25	28.46
Strasbourg	PS	8,802	12.80	19,077	27.75	14,220	20.69	5,017	7.30	4,743	6.90	5,294	7.70	1,169	1.70	2,749	4.00	1,414	2.06	1,048	1.52	1,257	1.83	1,385	2.01	838	1.22	352	0.51	276	0.40	200	0.29	902	1.31	49.94
Toulon	LR	14,870	30.71	10,207	21.08	4,460	9.21	5,158	10.65	2,770	5.72	2,210	4.56	1,580	3.26	1,008	2.08	1,016	2.10	1,036	2.14	1,329	2.74	926	1.91	671	1.39	208	0.43	350	0.72	251	0.52	367	0.76	48.38
Toulouse	LR	14,253	11.43	30,704	24.62	26,539	21.28	9,262	7.43	10,942	8.77	11,532	9.25	1,924	1.54	5,993	4.81	2,058	1.65	3,429	2.75	1,887	1.51	1,940	1.56	1,438	1.15	699	0.56	314	0.25	510	0.41	1,291	1.04	52.39
Tours	MR	5,294	14.26	9,522	25.66	6,746	18.18	3,395	9.15	2,312	6.23	2,944	7.93	934	2.52	1,503	4.05	838	2.26	785	2.12	696	1.88	770	2.07	408	1.10	270	0.73	136	0.37	139	0.37	421	1.13	48.23
Villeurbanne	PS	5,223	14.57	8,198	22.87	7,253	20.23	2,373	6.62	2,704	7.54	2,921	8.15	764	2.13	1,464	4.08	806	2.25	879	2.45	692	1.93	779	2.17	462	1.29	246	0.69	131	0.37	99	0.28	858	2.39	44.25

== Results ==
Both The French Communist Party and National Rally lost numerous seats and mayorships. La République En Marche! managed to retain mayorship of Le Havre by Prime Minister Edouard Philippe (he resigned his national position on 3 July). National Rally by itself lost about half of its representatives. Louis Aliot became the first National Rally mayor in Perpignan with a city of more than 100,000 people (although Aliot ran as independent). Les Republicains also suffered losses. Most of them were in large cities, where mayorships were lost to the Greens, although Les Republicains lost seats to the National Rally in small towns.

The Greens made significant gains in the election. They triumphed in Lyon, Marseille, Nancy, Strasbourg and Bordeaux. Anne Hidalgo and Martine Aubry retained their respective mayoralties of Paris and Lille. Including them, female candidates won in half of France's largest cities. Only 40% of the electorate participated in the second round, a significant drop from the prior local elections, likely due to concerns regarding the COVID-19 pandemic.

Marie Cau was elected the first transgender mayor in France, in Tilloy-lez-Marchiennes.

=== National results ===
	List-based municipalities				Majority ballots municipalities				All municipalities			
	First round		Second round		First round		Second round		First round		Second round	
	Votes	%	Votes	%	Votes	%	Votes	%	Votes	%	Votes	%
Expressed	15,789,730	95.36	6,175,538	97.08	4,058,899	97.06	483,307	94.94	19,848,629	95.70	6,658,845	96.92
Blank ballots	286,499	1.73	104,008	1.64	38,838	0.93	10,462	2.06	325,337	1.57	114,470	1.67
Null ballots	482,150	2.91	81,694	1.28	84,089	2.01	15,321	3.01	566,239	2.73	97,015	1.41
Voters	16,558,379	100	6,361,240	100	4,181,826	100	509,090	100	20,740,205	100	6,870,330	100
Abstentions	22,900,121	58.04	9,147,843	58.98	2,797,085	40.08	393,174	43.58	25,697,206	55.34	9,541,017	58.14
Registered voters	39,458,500	41.96	15,509,083	41.02	6,978,911	59.92	902,264	56.42	46,437,411	44.66	16,411,347	41.86

Results by political grouping (Only concerns municipalities with more than 1000 habitants)
List		First round			Second round			Total seats	Seat change
List		Votes	%	Seats	Votes	%	Seats	Total seats	Seat change
EXG	Far-left	76,499	0.49	26	5,565	0.09	5	31	30
Far-left		76,499	0.49	26	5,565	0.09	5	31	
PCF	French Communist Party	166,703	1.07	1,072	56,273	0.91	354	1,426	230
LFI	La France Insoumise	68,208	0.44	26	12,290	0.20	20	46	New
PS	Socialist Party	287,180	1.84	1,810	120,317	1.95	759	2,569	9,709
PRG	Radical Party of the Left	3,403	0.02	54	0	0.00	0	54	New
DVG	Miscellaneous left	2,364,848	14.98	15,023	1,073,093	17.38	7,607	22,630	21,609
UG	Union de la gauche	806,534	5.16	2,287	845,022	13.68	1,943	4,320	8,692
Left		3,696,876	23.51	20,272	2,106,995	34.12	10,683	31,045	
EELV	Europe Ecology – The Greens	373,959	2.37	183	127,049	2.06	332	515	182
ECO	Ecologists	137,540	0.87	426	73,093	1.18	430	856	New
Left Ecologists		511,499	3.24	609	200,142	3.24	762	1,371	
DIV	Miscellaneous	1,121,434	7.10	8,986	480,324	7.78	4,393	13,379	21,322
SE	Undesignated lists	4,089,704	25.90	115,394	396,396	6.42	7,820	123,214	New
REG	Regionalists	79,390	0.50	246	42,612	0.69	273	519	New
GJ	Gilets jaunes	3,258	0.02	2	87	0.00	0	2	New
Miscellaneous		5,293,786	33.52	124,628	919,419	14.89	12,486	137,114	
LREM	La République En Marche!	260,047	1.65	268	110,608	1.79	356	624	New
MDM	Democratic Movement	20,050	0.13	65	7,373	0.12	38	103	894
UDI	Union of Democrats and Independents	95,945	0.61	561	51,087	0.83	358	919	4,454
UC	Union du centre	262,863	1.66	320	142,147	2.30	284	604	40
DVC	Miscellaneous centre	1,327,168	8.41	8,291	661,943	10.72	4,561	12,852	New
Centre		1,966,073	12.46	9,505	973,158	15.76	5,597	15,102	
LR	The Republicans	725,454	4.59	3,534	330,615	5.35	1,639	5,173	5,978
LUD	Union de la droite	355,326	2.25	547	327,482	5.30	820	1,367	9,968
DVD	Miscellaneous right	2,764,243	17.51	22,332	1,147,627	18.58	8,225	30,557	45,705
DLF	Debout la France	4,732	0.03	5	427	0.01	1	6	New
Right		3,849,755	24.38	26,418	1,806,151	29.24	10,685	37,103	
RN	National Rally	363,699	2.30	498	145,900	2.36	329	827	671
EXD	Far-right	26,266	0.17	43	18,208	0.30	108	151	51
Far-right		389,965	2.47	541	164,108	2.66	437	978	
Election postponed due to COVID-19 (Guiana only)							164	164	

=== Communes with at least 70,000 inhabitants ===
Incumbent mayors marked with an asterisk (*) did not seek another term in 2020.

Commune	Department	Incumbent mayor	Party	Elected mayor	Party
Aix-en-Provence	Bouches-du-Rhône	Maryse Joissains-Masini	LR	Maryse Joissains-Masini	LR
Ajaccio	Corse-du-Sud	Laurent Marcangeli	DVD	Laurent Marcangeli	DVD
Amiens	Somme	Brigitte Fouré	UDI	Brigitte Fouré	UDI
Angers	Maine-et-Loire	Christophe Béchu	DVD	Christophe Béchu	DVD
Annecy	Haute-Savoie	Jean-Luc Rigaut	UDI	François Astorg	ECO
Antibes	Alpes-Maritimes	Jean Leonetti	LR	Jean Leonetti	LR
Argenteuil	Val-d'Oise	Georges Mothron	LR	Georges Mothron	LR
Asnières-sur-Seine	Hauts-de-Seine	Manuel Aeschlimann	LR	Manuel Aeschlimann	LR
Aubervilliers	Seine-Saint-Denis	Meriem Derkaoui	PCF	Karine Franclet	UDI
Aulnay-sous-Bois	Seine-Saint-Denis	Bruno Beschizza	LR	Bruno Beschizza	LR
Avignon	Vaucluse	Cécile Helle	PS	Cécile Helle	PS
Besançon	Doubs	Jean-Louis Fousseret	LREM	Anne Vignot	EELV
Béziers	Hérault	Robert Ménard	DVD	Robert Ménard	DVD
Bordeaux	Gironde	Nicolas Florian	LR	Pierre Hurmic	EELV
Boulogne-Billancourt	Hauts-de-Seine	Pierre-Christophe Baguet	LR	Pierre-Christophe Baguet	LR
Brest	Finistère	François Cuillandre	PS	François Cuillandre	PS
Caen	Calvados	Joël Bruneau	LR	Joël Bruneau	LR
Calais	Pas-de-Calais	Natacha Bouchart	LR	Natacha Bouchart	LR
Cannes	Alpes-Maritimes	David Lisnard	LR	David Lisnard	LR
Champigny-sur-Marne	Val-de-Marne	Christian Fautré	PCF	Laurent Jeanne	SL
Cherbourg-en-Cotentin	Manche	Benoît Arrivé	PS	Benoît Arrivé	PS
Clermont-Ferrand	Puy-de-Dôme	Olivier Bianchi	PS	Olivier Bianchi	PS
Colombes	Hauts-de-Seine	Nicole Goueta	LR	Patrick Chaimovitch	EELV
Courbevoie	Hauts-de-Seine	Jacques Kossowski	LR	Jacques Kossowski	LR
Créteil	Val-de-Marne	Laurent Cathala	PS	Laurent Cathala	PS
Dijon	Côte-d'Or	François Rebsamen	PS	François Rebsamen	PS
Drancy	Seine-Saint-Denis	Aude Lagarde	UDI	Aude Lagarde	UDI
Dunkerque	Nord	Patrice Vergriete	DVG	Patrice Vergriete	DVG
Fort-de-France	Martinique	Didier Laguerre	PPM	Didier Laguerre	PPM
Grenoble	Isère	Éric Piolle	EELV	Éric Piolle	EELV
La Rochelle	Charente-Maritime	Jean-François Fountaine	DVG	Jean-François Fountaine	DVG
Le Havre	Seine-Maritime	Jean-Baptiste Gastinne	LR	Édouard Philippe	DVD
Le Mans	Sarthe	Stéphane Le Foll	PS	Stéphane Le Foll	PS
Le Tampon	Réunion	André Thien Ah Koon	DVD	André Thien Ah Koon	DVD
Lille	Nord	Martine Aubry	PS	Martine Aubry	PS
Limoges	Haute-Vienne	Emile-Roger Lombertie	LR	Emile-Roger Lombertie	LR
Lyon	Lyon Metropolis	Gérard Collomb*	LREM	Grégory Doucet	EELV
Mamoudzou	Mayotte	Mohamed Majani	LREM	Ambdilwahedou Soumaila	LR
Marseille	Bouches-du-Rhône	Jean-Claude Gaudin*	LR	Michèle Rubirola	EELV
Mérignac	Gironde	Alain Anziani	PS	Alain Anziani	PS
Metz	Moselle	Dominique Gros*	PS	François Grosdidier	LR
Montpellier	Hérault	Philippe Saurel	DVG	Michaël Delafosse	PS
Montreuil	Seine-Saint-Denis	Patrice Bessac	PCF	Patrice Bessac	PCF
Mulhouse	Haut-Rhin	Michèle Lutz	LR	Michèle Lutz	LR
Nancy	Meurthe-et-Moselle	Laurent Hénart	MR	Mathieu Klein	PS
Nanterre	Hauts-de-Seine	Patrick Jarry	DVG	Patrick Jarry	DVG
Nantes	Loire-Atlantique	Johanna Rolland	PS	Johanna Rolland	PS
Nice	Alpes-Maritimes	Christian Estrosi	LR	Christian Estrosi	LR
Nîmes	Gard	Jean-Paul Fournier	LR	Jean-Paul Fournier	LR
Nouméa	New Caledonia	Sonia Lagarde	LREM	Sonia Lagarde	LREM
Orléans	Loiret	Olivier Carré	LREM	Serge Grouard	LR
Paris	Paris	Anne Hidalgo	PS	Anne Hidalgo	PS
Pau	Pyrénées-Atlantiques	François Bayrou	MoDem	François Bayrou	MoDem
Perpignan	Pyrénées-Orientales	Jean-Marc Pujol	LR	Louis Aliot	RN
Poitiers	Vienne	Alain Claeys	PS	Léonore Moncond'huy	EELV
Reims	Marne	Arnaud Robinet	LR	Arnaud Robinet	LR
Rennes	Ille-et-Vilaine	Nathalie Appéré	PS	Nathalie Appéré	PS
Roubaix	Nord	Guillaume Delbar	DVD	Guillaume Delbar	DVD
Rouen	Seine-Maritime	Yvon Robert*	PS	Nicolas Mayer-Rossignol	PS
Rueil-Malmaison	Hauts-de-Seine	Patrick Ollier	LR	Patrick Ollier	LR
Saint-Denis	Réunion	Gilbert Annette	PS	Ericka Bareigts	PS
Saint-Denis	Seine-Saint-Denis	Laurent Russier	PCF	Mathieu Hanotin	PS
Saint-Étienne	Loire	Gaël Perdriau	LR	Gaël Perdriau	LR
Saint-Maur-des-Fossés	Seine-Saint-Denis	Sylvain Berrios	LR	Sylvain Berrios	LR
Saint-Nazaire	Loire-Atlantique	David Samzun	PS	David Samzun	PS
Saint-Paul	Réunion	Joseph Sinimalé	LR	Huguette Bello	PLR
Saint-Pierre	Réunion	Michel Fontaine	LR	Michel Fontaine	LR
Strasbourg	Bas-Rhin	Roland Ries*	DVG	Jeanne Barseghian	EELV
Toulon	Var	Hubert Falco	LR	Hubert Falco	LR
Toulouse	Haute-Garonne	Jean-Luc Moudenc	LR	Jean-Luc Moudenc	LR
Tourcoing	Nord	Jean-Marie Vuylsteker*	LR	Gérald Darmanin	LREM
Tours	Indre-et-Loire	Christophe Bouchet	MR	Emmanuel Denis	EELV
Versailles	Yvelines	François de Mazières	DVD	François de Mazières	DVD
Villeurbanne	Lyon Metropolis	Jean-Paul Bret	PS	Cédric Van Styvendael	PS
Vitry-sur-Seine	Val-de-Marne	Jean-Claude Kennedy	PCF	Pierre Bell-Lloch	PCF

== See also ==
- 2020 Ain municipal elections
- 2020 Allier municipal elections
- 2020 Bas-Rhin municipal elections
- 2020 Caen municipal election
- 2020 Paris municipal election
- 2022 French presidential election
- 2019 European Parliament election in France
