= 2014 French municipal elections =

The French municipal elections of 2014 were held on 23 March of that year with a second round of voting, where necessary, on 30 March to elect the municipal councils of France's communes. The first task of each newly constituted municipal council is to elect a mayor for that commune.

Municipal councillors, and the mayors they elect, ordinarily serve a term of six years.

== Exit polls ==
An exit poll by pollster BVA showed:

Party	Political leaning of party	Percentage of total vote
Union for a Popular Movement and allies	Center-right	48%
Socialist Party and allies	Center-left	43%
National Front	Far-right	7%

== Balance by parties ==
=== Left Front ===
* Lost cities: Villejuif (55,923), Le Blanc-Mesnil (51,916), Saint-Ouen (47,783), Bobigny (47,224), Aubagne (45,800), Vaulx-en-Velin (42,726), Villepinte (35,850), Bagnolet (34,513), Viry-Châtillon (31,655), Roissy-en-Brie (22,436), Limeil-Brévannes (20,663), Achères (19,606), Hennebont (15,456), Fourmies (12,068), La Queue-en-Brie (11,506), Gisors (11,474), Saint-Orens-de-Gameville (11,196), Saint-Claude (10,690), Aniche (10,509), Vieux-Condé (10,172), Pierre-Bénite (10,011), Varennes-Vauzelles (9,567), Portes-lès-Valence (9,507), Grigny (9,094), Elne (8,100), Roussillon (7,983), Boucau (7,801), Houdain (7,623), Feignies (7,184), Migennes (7,126), Trignac (7,008), Divion (6,971), Lallaing (6,496), Quiévrechain (6,130), Coursan (6,050), Fenain (5,327), Cuges-les-Pins (4,898), Auchy-les-Mines (4,601), Évin-Malmaison (4,583), Vermelles (4,526), Drap (4,297), Laigneville (4,168), Hérin (3,947), Garchizy (3,836).

* Cities won: Montreuil (103,068), Aubervilliers (75,598), 1st arrondissement of Lyon (28,932), Thiers (11,232), Onnaing (8,720), Magnanville (5,904), Ambazac (5,555), Courpière (4,401), Rilhac-Rancon (4,313), Annay (4,246), Escautpont (4,227), Serémange-Erzange (4,203), Avesnes-les-Aubert (3,635).

=== Socialist Party ===
* Lost cities:, Reims (180,752), Tours (134,633), Pau (79,798), Ajaccio (66,809), Quimper (63,235), 9th arrondissement of Paris (60,120), Pessac (58,743), Chelles (52,817), Belfort (50,128), Charleville-Mézières (49,433), Chalon-sur-Saône (44,847), Anglet (38,581), Joué-lès-Tours (36,554), Nevers (36,210), Conflans-Sainte-Honorine (35,582), Schiltigheim (31,633), Palaiseau (30,316), Athis-Mons (29,831), Périgueux (29,811), Saint-Médard-en-Jalles (28,348), Bergerac (27,687), Montbéliard (25,974), Les Ulis (24,641), Villeparisis (24,525), Brétigny-sur-Orge (24,264), Dole (24,009), Montgeron (22,941), Mantes-la-Ville (19,839), Montceau-les-Mines (19,124), Maurepas (18,928), Chilly-Mazarin (18,843), Riom (18,291), Marmande (18,218), Ploemeur (17,747), Vendôme (16,849), Bruz (16,612), Cesson-Sévigné (15,413), Juvisy-sur-Orge (14,924), Issoire (14,170), Pontivy (14,011), Bois-d'Arcy (13,788), Guipavas (13,414), Rixheim (13,145), Épinay-sous-Sénart (12,129), Guebwiller (11,517), Valentigney (11,155), Beaumont (10,908), Orthez (10,886), Oloron-Sainte-Marie (10,854), Igny (10,522), Cosne-Cours-sur-Loire (10,484), Gerzat (10,389), Fondettes (10,306), Vernouillet (9,401), Saint-Germain-lès-Arpajon (9,324), Ploërmel (9,221), Crosne (9,190), Saint-Pierre-du-Mont (9,081), Meulan-en-Yvelines (8,921), Saint-Pierre-du-Perray (8,618), Bellerive-sur-Allier (8,530), Lempdes (8,397), Ballan-Miré (8,074), Coutras (8,062), Romagnat (8,049), Chinon (7,911), Saint-Vincent-de-Tyrosse (7,743), Cébazat (7,509), Questembert (7,464), Artigues-près-Bordeaux (7,290), Mordelles (7,230), Revin (7,187), Carbon-Blanc (6,941), Ambert (6,869), Les Essarts-le-Roi (6,298), Aire-sur-l'Adour (6,207), Châteaubourg (6,196), Inzinzac-Lochrist (6,129), Wissous (6,093), Plédran (6,053), Pordic (6,001), Bethoncourt (5,974), Magnanville (5,904), Lèves (5,675), Genlis (5,588), Gan (5,481), Montbard (5,476), Saint-Astier (5,468), Ceyrat (5,444), Bar-sur-Aube (5,214), Saintry-sur-Seine (5,140), Pauillac (5,059), Villabé (5,010), Bavilliers (4,889), Saint-Sever (4,758), Vouziers (4,094), Hillion (4,063), Ribérac (4,053), Castelnau-de-Médoc (3,902), Boissy-sous-Saint-Yon (3,713), Fumay (3,712), Romillé (3,670), Bavans (3,662), Brassac-les-Mines (3,308), Plancoët (3,084), Mussidan (2,878), Ambès (2,868), Plombières-lès-Dijon (2,771), Le Bugue (2,728), Puy-Guillaume (2,612), Vendays-Montalivet (2,480), Sainte-Foy-la-Grande (2,400), Le Buisson-de-Cadouin (2,094), Nohanent (1,968), Cercy-la-Tour (1,936), Corbigny (1,576),

== Results in largest cities ==
Cities	Population	Incumbent mayor	Party	Elected mayor	Party
Aix-en-Provence	141,545	Maryse Joissains-Masini	UMP	Maryse Joissains-Masini	UMP
Amiens	132,699	Gilles Demailly	PS	Brigitte Fouré	UDI
Angers	150,125	Frédéric Béatse	PS	Christophe Béchu	UMP
Argenteuil	106,817	Philippe Doucet	PS	Georges Mothron	UMP
Avignon	90,305	Marie-Josée Roig	UMP	Cécile Helle	PS
Besançon	116,952	Jean-Louis Fousseret	PS	Jean-Louis Fousseret	PS
Bordeaux	243,626	Alain Juppé	UMP	Alain Juppé	UMP
Boulogne-Billancourt	116,794	Pierre-Christophe Baguet	UMP	Pierre-Christophe Baguet	UMP
Brest	139,386	François Cuillandre	PS	François Cuillandre	PS
Caen	107,229	Philippe Duron	PS	Joël Bruneau	UMP
Clermont-Ferrand	141,463	Serge Godard	PS	Olivier Bianchi	PS
Dijon	153,003	François Rebsamen	PS	François Rebsamen	PS
Grenoble	160,215	Michel Destot	PS	Éric Piolle	EELV
Le Havre	172,074	Édouard Philippe	UMP	Édouard Philippe	UMP
Le Mans	144,244	Jean-Claude Boulard	PS	Jean-Claude Boulard	PS
Lille	231,491	Martine Aubry	PS	Martine Aubry	PS
Limoges	135,098	Alain Rodet	PS	Émile-Roger Lombertie	UMP
Lyon	500,715	Gérard Collomb	PS	Gérard Collomb	PS
Marseille	855,393	Jean-Claude Gaudin	UMP	Jean-Claude Gaudin	UMP
Metz	118,634	Dominique Gros	PS	Dominique Gros	PS
Montpellier	272,084	Hélène Mandroux	PS	Philippe Saurel	DVG
Montreuil	104,139	Dominique Voynet	EELV	Patrice Bessac	PCF
Mulhouse	112,063	Jean Rottner	UMP	Jean Rottner	UMP
Nancy	104,072	André Rossinot	UDI	Laurent Hénart	UDI
Nanterre	92,227	Patrick Jarry	DVG	Patrick Jarry	DVG
Nantes	292,718	Patrick Rimbert	PS	Johanna Rolland	PS
Nice	342,295	Christian Estrosi	UMP	Christian Estrosi	UMP
Nîmes	150,564	Jean-Paul Fournier	UMP	Jean-Paul Fournier	UMP
Nouméa	99,926	Jean Lèques	UMP	Sonia Lagarde	UDI
Orléans	114,375	Serge Grouard	UMP	Serge Grouard	UMP
Paris	2,229,621	Bertrand Delanoë	PS	Anne Hidalgo	PS
Perpignan	120,959	Jean-Marc Pujol	UMP	Jean-Marc Pujol	UMP
Reims	182,592	Adeline Hazan	PS	Arnaud Robinet	UMP
Rennes	221,373	Daniel Delaveau	PS	Nathalie Appéré	PS
Roubaix	95,866	Pierre Dubois	PS	Guillaume Delbar	UMP
Rouen	110,755	Yvon Robert	PS	Yvon Robert	PS
Saint-Denis, Réunion	142,442	Gilbert Annette	PS	Gilbert Annette	PS
Saint-Denis	109,343	Didier Paillard	PCF	Didier Paillard	PCF
Saint-Étienne	172,023	Maurice Vincent	PS	Gaël Perdriau	UMP
Saint-Paul, Réunion	104,332	Huguette Bello	PLR	Joseph Sinimalé	UMP
Strasbourg	275,718	Roland Ries	PS	Roland Ries	PS
Toulon	163,760	Hubert Falco	UMP	Hubert Falco	UMP
Toulouse	458,298	Pierre Cohen	PS	Jean-Luc Moudenc	UMP
Tourcoing	93,974	Michel-François Delannoy	PS	Gérald Darmanin	UMP
Tours	134,803	Jean Germain	PS	Serge Babary	UMP
Villeurbanne	147,192	Jean-Paul Bret	PS	Jean-Paul Bret	PS
Vitry-sur-Seine	90,075	Alain Audoubert	PCF	Alain Audoubert	PCF

=== Aix-en-Provence ===
Incumbent mayor: Maryse Joissains-Masini (UMP)

Candidate	Party	First round		Second round		Seats	
Candidate	Party	Votes	%	Votes	%	Nb.	+/-
Maryse Joissains-Masini	UMP	19,650	37,79	26,942	52,61	42	=
Bruno Genzana	UDI	5,885	11,32	26,942	52,61	42	=
Édouard Baldo	PS-POC	10,218	19,65	18,687	36,49	10	▼3
Catherine Rouvier	FN	5,416	10,34	5,577	10,89	3	▲3
François-Xavier de Peretti	UPA-PRG-GE	4,214	8,11				
François Hamy	EELV	2,536	4,88				
Anne Mesliand	PCF-PG	2,483	4,78				
Jean-Louis Keïta	DIV	1,467	2,82				
Najia Jennane	DVG	127	0,24				
Inscrits (eligible voters)		90,060	100,00	90,079	100,00		
Abstentions (did not vote)		36,899	40,97	36,937	41,01		
Votants (voted)		53,161	59,02	53,142	58,99		
Blancs et nuls (blank or invalid ballots)		1,165	1,29	1,936	3,64		
Exprimés (total valid votes)		51,996	98,71	51,206	96,36		

=== Amiens ===
Incumbent mayor: Gilles Demailly (PS)

Candidate	Party	First round		Second round		Seats	
Candidate	Party	Votes	%	Votes	%	Nb.	+/-
Brigitte Fouré	UDI-UMP-MoDem	16,533	44,79	19,062	50,38	42	▲30
Thierry Bonté	PS-EELV-PCF-PRG-MRC	9,098	24,65	12,788	33,80	9	▼34
Yves Dupille	FN	5,739	15,54	5,981	15,80	4	▲4
Cédric Maisse	PG	3,273	8,86				
Bruno Paleni	LO	944	2,55				
Nicolas Belvalette	DVG	801	2,17				
Mohamed Boulafrad	DVG	520	1,40				
Inscrits (eligible voters)		73,923	100,00	73,912	100,00		
Abstentions (did not vote)		35,472	47,99	34,437	46,59		
Votants (voted)		38,451	52,01	39,475	53,41		
Blancs et nuls (blank or invalid ballots)		1,543	4,01	1,644	4,16		
Exprimés (total valid votes)		36,908	95,99	37,831	95,84		

=== Angers ===
Incumbent mayor: Frédéric Béatse (PS)

Candidate	Party	First round		Second round		Seats	
Candidate	Party	Votes	%	Votes	%	Nb.	+/-
Christophe Béchu	UMP-MoDem	18,365	35,91	27,975	54,36	43	▲29
Frédéric Béatse*	PS-EELV-PCF	13,691	26,77	23,086	45,64	12	▼33
Jean-Luc Rotureau	PS	8,288	16,20				
Laurent Gérault	UDI	3,806	7,44				
Gaétan Dirand	FN	3,443	6,73				
Nathalie Sévaux	DIV	1,683	3,29				
Martin Nivault	PG-GA	1,075	2,10				
Marie-José Faligant	LO	477	0,93				
Hubert Lardeux	POI	307	0,60				
Inscrits (eligible voters)		88,281	100,00	88,311	100,00		
Abstentions (did not vote)		35,995	40,77	34,153	38,67		
Votants (voted)		52,286	59,23	54,158	61,33		
Blancs et nuls (blank or invalid ballots)		1,151	2,20	2,697	4,98		
Exprimés (total valid votes)		51,135	97,80	51,461	95,02		

=== Bordeaux ===
Incumbent mayor: Alain Juppé (UMP)

Candidate	Party	First round		Seats	
Candidate	Party	Votes	%	Nb.	+/-
Alain Juppé*	UMP-UDI-MoDem	46,489	60,95	52	▲2
Vincent Feltesse	PS-EELV-PRG-MRC	17,224	22,58	7	▼4
Jacques Colombier	FN	4,626	6,06	2	▲2
Vincent Maurin	PCF-PG	3,506	4,60		
Yves Simone	DIV	2,128	2,79		
Philippe Poutou	NPA	1,914	2,51		
Fanny Quandalle	LO	391	0,51		
Inscrits (eligible voters)		140,358	100,00		
Abstentions (did not vote)		62,760	44,71		
Votants (voted)		77,598	55,29		
Blancs et nuls (blank or invalid ballots)		1,320	1,70		
Exprimés (total valid votes)		76,278	98,30		

=== Caen ===
Incumbent mayor: Philippe Duron (PS)

Candidate	Party	First round		Second round		Seats	
Candidate	Party	Votes	%	Votes	%	Nb.	+/-
Joël Bruneau	UMP	10,186	30,79	19,458	57,03	43	▲31
Sonia de La Provôté	UDI-MoDem	5,958	18,01	19,458	57,03	43	▲31
Philippe Duron*	PS-PCF-PRG-MRC	8,670	26,21	14,657	42,96	12	▼31
Rudy L'Orphelin	EELV	3,383	10,22	14,657	42,96	12	▼31
Philippe Chapron	FN	2,421	7,31				
Étienne Adam	E!-NPA-PG	1,922	5,81				
Pierre Casevitz	LO	537	1,62				
Inscrits (eligible voters)		58,111	100,00	58,117	100,00		
Abstentions (did not vote)		24,074	41,43	22,396	38,54		
Votants (voted)		34,037	58,57	35,721	61,46		
Blancs et nuls (blank or invalid ballots)		960	2,82	1,606	4,50		
Exprimés (total valid votes)		33,077	97,18	34,115	95,50		

=== Grenoble ===
Incumbent mayor: Michel Destot (PS)

Candidate	Party	First round		Second round		Seats	
Candidate	Party	Votes	%	Votes	%	Nb.	+/-
Éric Piolle	EELV-PG-GA	12,759	29,41	19,677	40,02	42	▲36
Jérôme Safar	PS-PCF-PRG-MRC-Cap21	10,982	25,31	13,496	27,45	8	▼36
Matthieu Chamussy	UMP-UDI	9,052	20,86	11,795	23,99	7	▼2
Mireille d'Ornano	FN	5,449	12,56	4,193	8,52	2	▲2
Philippe de Longevialle	MoDem	1,956	4,51				
Denis Bonzy	NC	1,533	3,53				
Lahcen Benmaza	DIV	788	1,82				
Catherine Brun	LO	516	1,19				
Maurice Colliat	POI	350	0,81				
Inscrits (eligible voters)		84,816	100,00	84,819	100,00		
Abstentions (did not vote)		40,369	47,60	34,730	40,95		
Votants (voted)		44,447	52,40	50,089	59,05		
Blancs et nuls (blank or invalid ballots)		1,062	2,39	928	1,85		
Exprimés (total valid votes)		43,385	97,61	49,161	98,15		

=== Le Havre ===
Incumbent mayor: Édouard Philippe (UMP)

Candidate	Party	First round		Seats	
Candidate	Party	Votes	%	Nb.	+/-
Édouard Philippe*	UMP-UDI	26,660	52,04	45	▼1
Camille Galap	PS-EELV-PRG	8,580	16,75	5	▲1
Nathalie Nail	PCF-PG	8,384	16,37	5	▼4
Damien Lenoir	FN	6,877	13,43	4	▲4
Magali Cauchois	LO	724	1,41		
Inscrits (eligible voters)		113,130	100,00		
Abstentions (did not vote)		59,921	52,97		
Votants (voted)		53,209	47,03		
Blancs et nuls (blank or invalid ballots)		1,984	3,73		
Exprimés (total valid votes)		51,225	96,27		

=== Lille ===
Incumbent mayor: Martine Aubry (PS)

Candidate	Party	First round		Second round		Seats	
Candidate	Party	Votes	%	Votes	%	Nb.	+/-
Martine Aubry*	PS-PRG-MRC	19,422	34,86	29,125	52,05	47	▼4
Lise Daleux	EELV	6,176	11,08	29,125	52,05	47	▼4
Jean-René Lecerf	UMP-UDI-MoDem	12,667	22,73	16,626	29,71	9	▼1
Éric Dillies	FN	9,557	17,15	10,198	18,22	5	▲5
Hugo Vandamme	PCF-PG	3,437	6,17				
Alessandro di Giuseppe	EXG	1,978	3,55				
Jacques Mutez	DVG	1,047	1,88				
Nicole Baudrin	LO	821	1,47				
Jan Pauwels	NPA	611	1,10				
Inscrits (eligible voters)		120,970	100,00	120,977	100,00		
Abstentions (did not vote)		63,576	52,56	62,133	51,36		
Votants (voted)		57,394	47,44	58,844	48,64		
Blancs et nuls (blank or invalid ballots)		1,678	2,92	2,895	4,92		
Exprimés (total valid votes)		55,716	97,08	55,949	95,08		

=== Limoges ===
Incumbent mayor: Alain Rodet (PS)

Candidate	Party	First round		Second round		Seats	
Candidate	Party	Votes	%	Votes	%	Nb.	+/-
Alain Rodet*	PS-EELV-PRG-MRC	13,325	30,11	20,513	43,81	12	▼35
Gilbert Bernard	PCF-PG	6,262	14,15	20,513	43,81	12	▼35
Emile-Roger Lombertie	UMP	10,528	23,79	21,100	45,07	40	▲32
Pierre Coinaud	UDI-MoDem	5,451	12,31	21,100	45,07	40	▲32
Vincent Gérard	FN	7,504	16,95	5,201	11,10	3	▲3
Élisabeth Faucon	LO	1,180	2,66				
Inscrits (eligible voters)		77,115	100,00	77,117	100,00		
Abstentions (did not vote)		30,479	39,52	27,598	35,79		
Votants (voted)		46,636	60,48	49,519	64,21		
Blancs et nuls (blank or invalid ballots)		2,386	5,12	2,705	5,46		
Exprimés (total valid votes)		44,250	97,18	46,814	94,54		

=== Lyon ===
Incumbent mayor: Gérard Collomb (PS)

Candidate	Party	First round		Second round		Seats	
Candidate	Party	Votes	%	Votes	%	Nb.	+/-
Gérard Collomb*	PS-PRG-MRC	52,495	35,75	65,659	50,64	48	▼6
Etienne Tête	EELV	13,065	8,90	65,659	50,64	48	▼6
Michel Havard	UMP-UDI	44,767	30,49	44,385	34,24	21	▲2
Christophe Boudot	FN	17,902	12,19	13,411	10,34	1	▲1
Aline Guitard	PCF-PG-GRAM	11,095	7,56	6,191	4,78	3	▲3
Éric Lafond	MoDem	5,436	3,70				
Others		2,278	0,85				
Inscrits (eligible voters)		266,395	100,00	235,399	100,00		
Abstentions (did not vote)		116,977	43,91	102,248	43,44		
Votants (voted)		149,418	56,09	133,151	56,56		
Blancs et nuls (blank or invalid ballots)		2,607	1,74	3,505	2,63		
Exprimés (total valid votes)		146,811	98,26	129,646	97,37		

=== Marseille ===
Incumbent mayor: Jean-Claude Gaudin (UMP)

Candidate	Party	First round		Second round		Seats	
Candidate	Party	Votes	%	Votes	%	Nb.	+/-
Jean-Claude Gaudin*	UMP-UDI-MoDem	96,132	37,64	96,813	42,39	61	▲10
Stéphane Ravier	FN	59,159	23,16	60,548	26,51	20	▲19
Patrick Mennucci	PS-EELV-PRG-MRC	53,030	20,77	70,999	31,09	20	▼29
Jean-Marc Coppola	PCF-PG	18,132	7,10	70,999	31,09	20	▼29
Pape Diouf	DVG	14,377	5,63				
Others		14,047	5,50				
Inscrits (eligible voters)		491,097	100,00	412,940	100,00		
Abstentions (did not vote)		228,197	46,47	176,395	42,72		
Votants (voted)		262,900	53,53	236,545	57,28		
Blancs et nuls (blank or invalid ballots)		7,519	2,86	8,185	3,46		
Exprimés (total valid votes)		255,381	97,14	228,360	96,54		

=== Nancy ===
Incumbent mayor: André Rossinot (UDI)

Candidate	Party	First round		Second round		Seats	
Candidate	Party	Votes	%	Votes	%	Nb.	+/-
Laurent Hénart	UDI-UMP-MoDem	11,744	40,47	15,418	52,91	42	Steady
Mathieu Klein	PS-EELV-PRG-MRC	10,377	35,75	13,721	47,08	13	▲2
Bora Yilmaz	PCF-PG	1,580	5,44	13,721	47,08	13	▲2
Pierre Ducarne	FN	2,007	6,91				
Frank-Olivier Potier	DVD	1,793	6,17				
Denis Gabet	DVD	1,170	4,03				
Christiane Nimsgern	LO	348	1,19				
Inscrits (eligible voters)		50,690	100,00	50,693	100,00		
Abstentions (did not vote)		21,023	41,47	20,532	40,50		
Votants (voted)		29,667	58,53	30,161	59,50		
Blancs et nuls (blank or invalid ballots)		648	2,18	1,022	3,39		
Exprimés (total valid votes)		29,019	97,82	29,139	96,61		

=== Paris ===
In Paris, Nathalie Kosciusko-Morizet (UMP) with 35,91 percent of the votes and Anne Hidalgo (PS) with 34,40 percent qualified for the second round. Hidalgo won the second round with 54.5 percent of the votes, becoming Paris's first female mayor.

The lists supporting Hidalgo (PS, Communists, Radical Party of the Left, Europe Ecology – The Greens) got 91 seats, the lists supporting Kosciusko-Morizet (UMP, UDI and MoDem) received 71, while the Left Party received 1.

=== Perpignan ===
Incumbent mayor: Jean-Marc Pujol (UMP)

Candidate	Party	First round		Second round		Seats	
Candidate	Party	Votes	%	Votes	%	Nb.	+/-
Louis Aliot	FN	12,949	34,18	17,744	44,88	12	▲10
Jean-Marc Pujol*	UMP-UDI	11,617	30,67	21,786	55,11	43	▲2
Jacques Cresta	PS-PCF-PRG-MRC	4,497	11,87	Retired		0	▼12
Clotilde Ripoull	DVD	3,646	9,62				
Jean Codognès	EELV	2,147	5,66				
Philippe Simon	CDC	1,067	2,81				
Stéphanie Font	NPA	851	2,24				
Axel Belliard	DVG	719	1,89				
Liberto Plana	LO	384	1,01				
Inscrits (eligible voters)		68,813	100,00	68,811	100,00		
Abstentions (did not vote)		29,599	43,01	25,632	37,25		
Votants (voted)		39,214	56,99	43,179	62,75		
Blancs et nuls (blank or invalid ballots)		1,337	3,41	3,649	8,45		
Exprimés (total valid votes)		37,877	96,59	39,530	91,55		

=== Reims ===
Incumbent mayor: Adeline Hazan (PS)

Candidate	Party	First round		Second round		Seats	
Candidate	Party	Votes	%	Votes	%	Nb.	+/-
Arnaud Robinet	UMP-UDI	20,159	39,63	25,297	46,19	44	▲31
Adeline Hazan*	PS-EELV-PCF-PRG-MRC	19,477	38,29	23,414	42,75	12	▼34
Roger Paris	FN	8,144	16,01	6,050	11,04	3	▲3
Karim Mellouki	PG-GA	1,736	3,41				
Thomas Rose	LO	1,347	2,65				
Inscrits (eligible voters)		100,356	100,00	100,359	100,00		
Abstentions (did not vote)		48,234	48,06	44,392	44,23		
Votants (voted)		52,122	51,94	55,967	55,77		
Blancs et nuls (blank or invalid ballots)		1,259	2,42	1,206	2,15		
Exprimés (total valid votes)		50,863	97,58	54,761	97,85		

=== Toulon ===
Incumbent mayor: Hubert Falco (UMP)

Candidate	Party	First round		Seats	
Candidate	Party	Votes	%	Nb.	+/-
Hubert Falco*	UMP-UDI	32,583	59,26	50	▼3
Jean-Yves Waquet	FN	11,257	20,47	6	▲4
Robert Alfonsi	PS-EELV-PRG-MRC	5,561	10,11	3	▼1
André de Ubeda	PCF-PG	2,205	4,01		
Olivier Lesage	AEI	1,678	3,05		
Geneviève Esquier	EXD	1,246	2,26		
Renée Defrance	LO	447	0,81		
Inscrits (eligible voters)		107,401	100,00		
Abstentions (did not vote)		51,314	47,78		
Votants (voted)		56,087	52,22		
Blancs et nuls (blank or invalid ballots)		1,110	1,98		
Exprimés (total valid votes)		54,977	98,02		

=== Toulouse ===
Incumbent mayor: Pierre Cohen (PS)

Candidate	Party	First round		Second round		Seats	
Candidate	Party	Votes	%	Votes	%	Nb.	+/-
Jean-Luc Moudenc	UMP-UDI-MoDem	49,554	38,20	73,708	52,07	53	▲36
Pierre Cohen*	PS-PCF-PRG-MRC	41,851	32,26	67,869	47,93	16	▼36
Antoine Maurice	EELV-PP	9,064	6,99	67,869	47,93	16	▼36
Serge Laroze	FN	10,574	8,15				
Jean-Christophe Sellin	PCF-PG	6,616	5,10				
Christine de Veyrac	UDI	3,183	2,45				
Élisabeth Belaubre	Cap21	3,141	2,42				
Jean-Pierre Plancade	PRG	2,753	2,12				
Ahmad Chouki	NPA	2,170	1,67				
Sandra Torremocha	LO	818	0,63				
Inscrits (eligible voters)		254,538	100,00	254,547	100,00		
Abstentions (did not vote)		121,629	47,78	107,764	42,34		
Votants (voted)		132,909	52,22	146,783	57,66		
Blancs et nuls (blank or invalid ballots)		3,185	2,40	5,206	3,55		
Exprimés (total valid votes)		129,724	97,60	141,577	96,45		

=== Villeurbanne ===
Incumbent mayor: Jean-Paul Bret (PS)

Candidate	Party	First round		Second round		Seats	
Candidate	Party	Votes	%	Votes	%	Nb.	+/-
Jean-Paul Bret*	PS-PCF-PRG-MRC	14,872	41,50	16,662	45,46	41	▼3
Jean-Wilfried Martin	UMP-UDI-MoDem	8,079	22,55	9,157	24,98	7	▼4
Stéphane Poncet	FN	6,287	17,54	5,823	15,88	4	▲4
Béatrice Vessiller	EELV-PG	5,667	15,81	5,004	13,65	3	▲3
Philippe Bruneau	LO	929	2,59				
Inscrits (eligible voters)		80,206	100,00	80,207	100,00		
Abstentions (did not vote)		43,414	54,13	42,648	53,17		
Votants (voted)		36,792	45,87	37,559	46,83		
Blancs et nuls (blank or invalid ballots)		958	2,60	913	2,43		
Exprimés (total valid votes)		35,834	97,40	36,646	97,57		

== Results in symbolic cities ==
=== Hénin-Beaumont ===
Incumbent mayor: Eugène Binaisse (PS)

Candidate	Party	First round		Seats	
Candidate	Party	Votes	%	Nb.	+/-
Steeve Briois	FN	6,006	50,25	28	▲20
Eugène Binaisse*	PS-EELV-PCF-PRG	3,829	32,04	6	▼20
Gérard Dalongeville	DVG	1,167	9,76	1	Steady
Georges Bouquillon	MRC	484	4,05		
Jean-Marc Legrand	UMP-UDI	464	3,88		
Inscrits (eligible voters)		19,048	100,00		
Abstentions (did not vote)		6,744	35,41		
Votants (voted)		12,304	64,59		
Blancs et nuls (blank or invalid ballots)		354	2,88		
Exprimés (total valid votes)		11,950	97,12		

=== Pau ===
Incumbent mayor: Martine Lignières-Cassou (PS)

Candidate	Party	First round		Second round		Seats	
Candidate	Party	Votes	%	Votes	%	Nb.	+/-
François Bayrou	MoDem-UMP-UDI	12,749	41,85	18,388	62,95	40	▲31
David Habib	PS-PRG-MRC	7,850	25,76	10,821	37,04	9	▼26
Olivier Dartigolles	PCF-PG	1,621	5,32	10,821	37,04	9	▼26
Yves Urieta	LGM	4,024	13,20	Retired		0	▼5
Georges de Pachtère	FN	2,054	6,74				
Eurydice Bled	EELV	1,629	5,34				
Mehdi Jabrane	DIV	535	1,75				
Inscrits (eligible voters)		53,317	100,00	52,955	100,00		
Abstentions (did not vote)		22,029	41,32	21,706	40,99		
Votants (voted)		31,288	58,68	31,249	59,01		
Blancs et nuls (blank or invalid ballots)		826	2,64	2,040	6,53		
Exprimés (total valid votes)		30,462	97,36	29,209	93,47		
