= François Grosdidier =

French politician

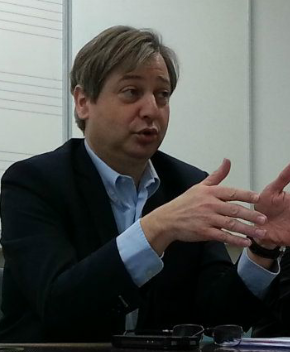
- François Grosdidier

Mayor of Metz
- Incumbent
- Assumed office 3 July 2020
- Preceded by: Dominique Gros

Member of the French Senate for Moselle
- In office 1 October 2011 – 13 July 2020

Mayor of Woippy
- In office 19 March 2001 – 23 October 2017
- Preceded by: Jérôme Prache
- Succeeded by: Cédric Gouth

Personal details
- Born: 25 February 1961 (age 65) Metz, France
- Party: The Republicans

François Grosdidier (French pronunciation: [fʁɑ̃swa ɡʁodidje]; born 25 February 1961) is a French politician. He served as mayor of Metz since 2020. He also represented the Moselle department in the Senate and is a member of The Republicans.

== Early life and education ==
François Grosdidier is the grandson of an historian and the son of an engineer working in the iron and steel industry of Lorraine. After a bad schooling, he joined the French Air Force to serve overseas in Djibouti in 1979. He held lot of odd jobs. Then he resumed studies in public law. He was hired as city manager of Amnéville.

Part of his family have emigrated in the United States. His cousin, Pierre Grosdidier, is an attorney in Houston, Texas, and became elected councillor in the French Consulate in Houston when Damien Regnard has been inaugurated as senator representing French citizens abroad in 2018.

== Political career ==
His first election campaign dates back to 1973, when he was 12, with Jean Kiffer, member of Parliament and mayor of Amnéville. He joined the right-wing Rally for the Republic, led by Jacques Chirac, in 1981. In 1983 he became chief of the Youth RPR of Moselle.

From 1989 to 1995 (one complete term), he was elected municipal councillor of the city of Metz, seating in the opposition to the mayor, Jean-Marie Rausch. Elected in the regional council of Lorraine in 1992, he was immediately appointed vice-president of the new president, Gérard Longuet. His regional department covered industrial reconversion, new technologies of information, training and professional learning. Reelected in 1998, he was in office until his resignation in 2002.

During the 1993 French legislative election, he contested the seat of the 1st constituency of Moselle (departement) (part and north of Metz), a left-wing workers district. He beat the outgoing Parliament member from the Socialist Party, former minister of François Mitterrand, becoming at 32 one of the youngest members of the French National Assembly.

After supporting Jacques Chirac for the 1995 French presidential election, the Prime minister Alain Juppé entrusted him for a parliamentary mission on industrial reconversion. When Jacques Chirac decided to dissolve the National Assembly in 1997, François Grosdidier lost the election against the candidate of the Socialist Party, in the second round.

He shortly came back to the local civil service after losing his seat, then he worked in the steel industry.

In March 2001, he won the municipal election in Woippy, a poor Metz suburb city, with 62% in the second round. He was elected mayor by the council in April, and was reelected in 2008 and 2014, both in the first round. During his three terms as mayor, he renovated the city housing and restored security by an increasing of number of police officers. The city has gained 4000 more inhabitants.

During the 2002 French legislative election, he won again the seat of the Moselle's 1st constituency with 55% of the vote, and was reelected again in 2007 with 52%. During his terms, he has committed to immigration issues, and was an opponent to the using of genetically modified organisms. During the 2005 French riots, he was threatened after filing a complaint against some rappers accused of racist lyrics against the French. He was a supporter of French President Nicolas Sarkozy.

From 2006 to 2009, he was president of the right-wing Union for a Popular Movement party in Moselle. From 2009 to 2018, he was designated president of the Moselle Organization of mayors, representing the interests of the 730 municipalities of this département.

During the 2011 French Senate election, (indirect election in order to renew half of the Senate), François Grosdidier contested one of the 5 seats of Moselle. He received, on a party-list proportional representation voting system, 411 votes of the 2833 local officials. He was reelected in 2017 after his first six-years term with 596 votes. In the Senate, he is vice-president of the local government committee, member of the law permanent committee. In 2018, he led an inquiry parliamentary commission about French police.

He was elected as president of The Republicans (France) party in Moselle from 2016 to 2018. He supported Alain Juppé for the 2016 The Republicans (France) presidential primary.

After his reelection as senator in 2017, he was forced to resign from his office of mayor of Woippy, due to the effective date of the 2014 law banning dual mandate for members of both houses of Parliament. However, he can remain as member of the town council.

On 29 March 2019, he announced his candidacy for mayor of the city of Metz in the 2020 election.

On the 3rd of July 2020, he officially became Mayor of Metz after being elected on the 28th of June.
