= Jean-Marc Pujol =

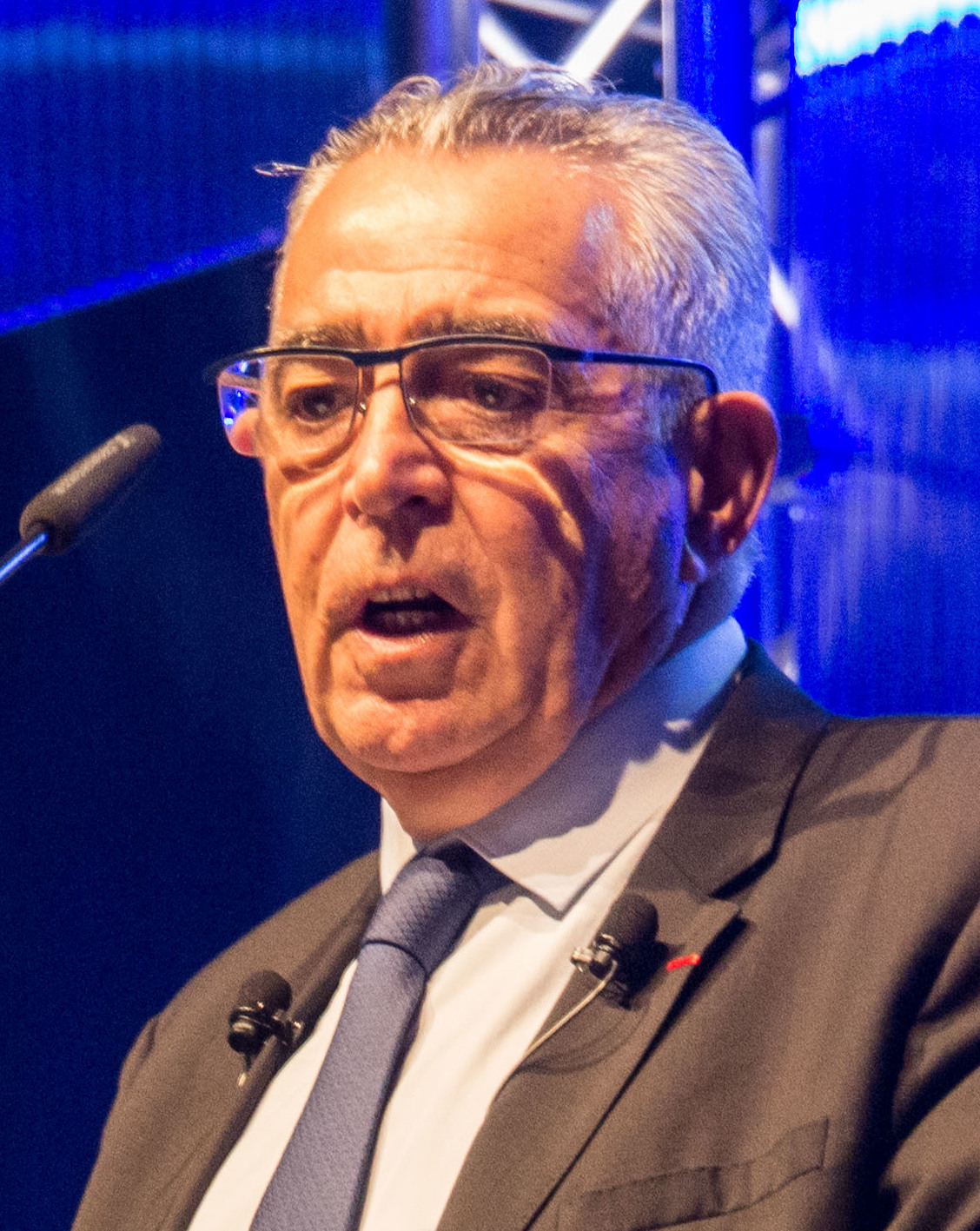
- Pujol in 2018

President of Perpignan Méditerranée Métropole
- In office 14 April 2014 – 11 July 2020
- Preceded by: Jean-Paul Alduy
- Succeeded by: Robert Vila

Mayor of Perpignan
- In office 22 October 2009 – 3 July 2020
- Preceded by: Jean-Paul Alduy
- Succeeded by: Louis Aliot

Personal details
- Born: 4 April 1949 (age 77) Mostaganem, French Algeria
- Party: LR (since 2015)
- Other political affiliations: UMP (2002–2015), RPR (1981–2002)
- Education: University of Montpellier
- Profession: Lawyer
- Awards: Knight of the Legion of Honour (2009)

Jean-Marc Gabriel Pujol (French pronunciation: [ʒɑ̃ maʁk ɡabʁijɛl pyʒɔl]; born 4 April 1949) is a French former politician. He was a city councillor in Perpignan in Pyrénées-Orientales from 1989 to 2020, serving as mayor from 2009. He was the president of Perpignan Méditerranée Métropole from 2014 to 2020.

== Biography ==
Born in Mostaganem in French Algeria, Pujol left the country in 1962, four days before its independence. As a law student at the University of Montpellier, he campaigned for Valéry Giscard d'Estaing in the 1974 French presidential election. After François Mitterrand's victory seven years later, Pujol joined the Republican Party. By profession, he was a financial lawyer, specialising in international trade.

Pujol was elected to Perpignan City Council in 1989 as 17th on Jean-Paul Alduy's list, and wore a badge of the Polish union Solidarnosc on his first day; an avowed anti-communist, he described the Fall of the Berlin Wall as the "most beautiful day" of his life. From 1995 he was deputy to mayor Alduy, whom he succeeded in October 2009 upon the latter's resignation. He had been made a Knight of the Legion of Honour at the start of the year.

In 2013, Pujol made a municipal decree banning a performance by Dieudonné M'bala M'bala, on the grounds that the convicted antisemitic comedian presented a risk to public disorder. The ban was overturned by a regional court, ostensibly because the comedian would not perform a controversial song.

In the 2014 French municipal elections, Pujol was the Union for a Popular Movement (UMP) candidate. In the first round, Louis Aliot of the National Front (FN) received 34.2% of the vote compared to 30.57% for Pujol. In the second round, with a turnout five percentage points higher, Pujol won the run-off with 55.11% of the vote. Days later, he was elected president of the Perpignan Méditerranée Métropole with 63 votes, compared to 12 for Jean Vila, the Communist mayor of Cabestany, and 11 for Aliot.

Pujol, mayor of a city in a region with Catalan culture, proposed mediation between Spain and Catalonia in October 2017, following the 2017 Catalan independence referendum. He wanted the mediator to be Manuel Valls, the former prime minister of France who was born in Barcelona.

Ahead of the 2020 French municipal elections, Pujol sought the endorsement of La République En Marche (LREM) in order to avoid vote splitting that would benefit Aliot. LREM delegate Stanislas Guerini said that his party was endorsing its own candidate Romain Grau but was open to a withdrawal before the second round. Despite the withdrawals of Grau and the Europe Ecologie-The Greens (EELV) candidate, Aliot won with 53.09% in the run-off.
