= Alain Anziani =

French politician (1951–2025)

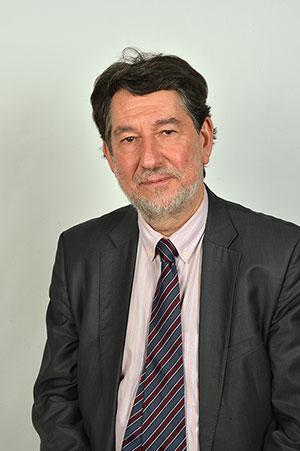
Alain Anziani

Alain Anziani (30 May 1951 – 19 July 2025) was a French politician of the Socialist Party (PS) who served as president of Bordeaux Métropole from 2020 until 2024. From 2008 to 2017, he was member of the Senate of France, representing the Gironde department, and beginning in 2014, he was mayor of Mérignac.

Ahead of the Socialist Party's 2011 primaries, Anziani endorsed Martine Aubry as the party's candidate for the 2012 presidential election.

Anziani died after a long illness on 19 July 2025, at the age of 74.

== Biography ==
Alain Anziani was born on May 30, 1951, in Paris, to a Corsican father, a laborer and Gaullist, and a Breton mother.

With two Master's degree in philosophy and law and a postgraduate degree in economics, Alain Anziani became a lawyer in 1979. In 1982, he moved to Gironde, where he was responsible for planning in the office of Philippe Madrelle, the socialist president of the Aquitaine Regional Council, and oversaw planning contracts with the state, departments, and urban areas. In 1986, following the political shift in the Aquitaine regional elections, he returned to practicing law at the Bordeaux Bar.

At the same time, in 1986 he became president of the Gironde Departmental Council of Secular Family Associations and in 1988 he sat on the Departmental Union of Family Associations as a designated administrator.

From 1993 to 2009, he served as first secretary of the departmental federation of the Socialist Party.

In 1992, he headed the Gironde list in the 1992 French regional elections and was elected. From 1998 to 2008, he was vice president of the region in charge of finance and planning, then economic action.

In a 1993 cantonal by-election, triggered by the resignation of Joëlle Dusseau, he stood as a candidate in the Canton of Le Bouscat, but was defeated by Dominique Vincent, the RPR candidate.

In 2001,Michel Sainte-Marie, deputy mayor of Mérignac, Gironde, appointed him deputy mayor in charge of urban policy, neighborhood councils and therefore citizen participation, the integration of the most disadvantaged, Agenda 21, and the major project of the media library located in the former town hall in the city center. After the 2008 municipal elections, he became deputy mayor for finance and innovation. He is also responsible, on behalf of the city of Mérignac and the Bordeaux urban community, for Bordeaux Aéroparc, an industrial and scientific park dedicated to aeronautics.

He was elected to the Senate for Gironde on September 21, 2008. He then resigned as vice president of the region and gave up his law practice to devote himself to his new duties. During the 2011 elections, he was appointed to the Senate bureau as quaestor. During these years, he was the rapporteur for numerous texts, most recently the bill on combating tax fraud and serious financial crime.

He headed the list for the March 2014 municipal elections in Mérignac and won the elections before being elected mayor of the city on April 5. On April 18, he was elected first vice-president of the Bordeaux Métropole urban community.

As a member of the Senate's International Information Group on Tibet, he wrote to President François Hollande about the situation in Tibet.

On October 1, 2017, he was one of the last thirteen senators (out of a total of 41) to resign in order to focus on their local mandates, in accordance with the law on multiple Dual mandate. Laurence Harribey, who followed him on the list in 2014, replaced him.

He was elected president of Bordeaux Métropole on July 17, 2020, thanks to an alliance between the Socialists and the Greens. He thus became the seventh president of Bordeaux Métropole, succeeding Patrick Bobet. He resigned on March 4, 2024 for health reasons. Christine Bost was elected to succeed him by the 104 metropolitan elected representatives on March 15, 2024.

On March 25, 2025, he announced in a letter his upcoming resignation from the Mérignac, Gironde town hall due to numerous health problems. He was suffering from two types of cancer and Parkinson's disease. He made his resignation official on May 26 and was replaced by his first deputy, Thierry Trijoulet, on June 2. He died on July 19, 2025, in Bordeaux.

== Sources ==
- Page on the Senate website (in French)
