= Stéphane Ravier =

French politician (born 1969)

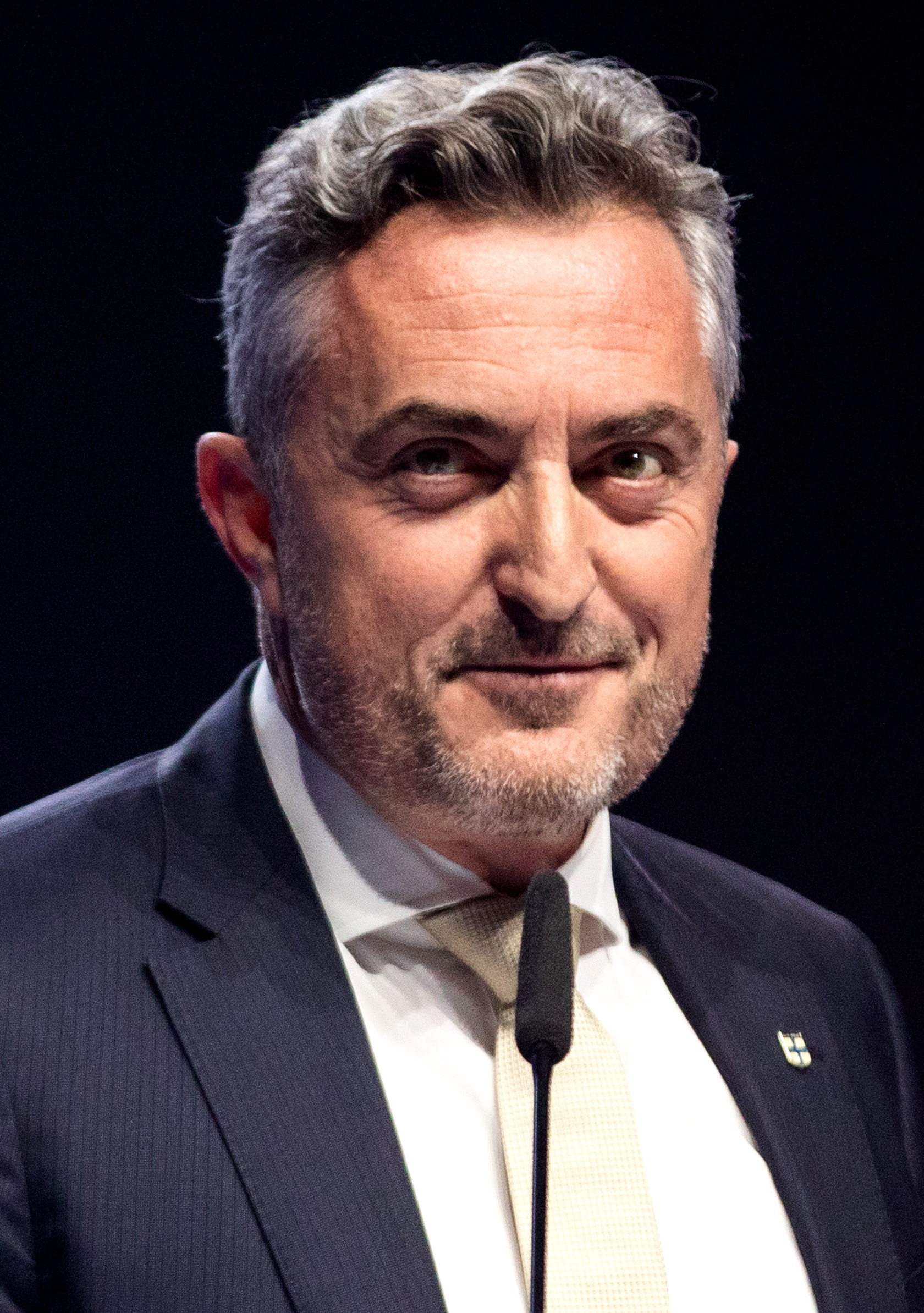
- Ravier in 2022

Senator for Bouches-du-Rhône
- In office 1 October 2014 – 1 October 2026

Municipal councillor of Marseille
- In office 4 April 2014 – 22 March 2026

Member of the Regional Council of Provence-Alpes-Côte d'Azur
- In office 28 March 2010 – 7 January 2016

Personal details
- Born: 4 August 1969 (age 57) Gap, France
- Party: Reconquête (2022–2024)
- Other political affiliations: National Rally (1991–2022)
- Occupation: Civil servant
- Website: stephane-ravier.com

Stéphane Ravier (French pronunciation: [stefan ʁavje]; born 4 August 1969) is a French politician and former civil servant who has represented the Bouches-du-Rhône department in the Senate since 2014. A former member of the National Rally who joined Reconquête in 2022, he previously held a seat in the Regional Council of Provence-Alpes-Côte d'Azur from 2010 to 2016.

== Biography ==
A native of Gap, Ravier was first elected to the Regional Council of Provence-Alpes-Côte d'Azur in 2010 on the National Front list (renamed National Rally in 2018) led by Jean-Marie Le Pen. He held his seat until his resignation in early 2016.

Ravier was elected to the Senate in 2014 and reelected in 2020—alongside David Rachline, they became the first Front National candidates elected to the Senate. He was his party's top candidate in the 2014 and 2020 municipal elections in Marseille, in which he led lists that respectively placed second and third. He has been a municipal councillor of Marseille since 4 April 2014. He held the mayorship of 7th sector of Marseille (13th and 14th arrondissements) from 11 April 2014 to 22 September 2017.

In February 2022, during Marine Le Pen's presidential campaign, Ravier publicly endorsed far-right presidential rival Éric Zemmour. He subsequently joined his new Reconquête party. He is currently one of two members of Reconquête in the Senate alongside Sébastien Meurant of Val-d'Oise. He left Reconquête in 2024.
