= Mohed Altrad =

French businessman

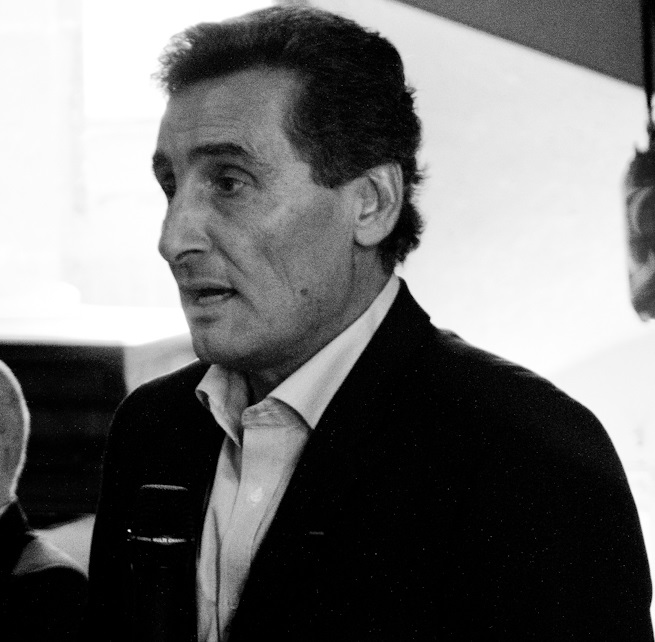
- Born: 1948 (age 77–78); Raqqa, Syria
- Education: Paris Dauphine University
- Occupations: Businessman; President of Montpellier Hérault Rugby

Mohed Altrad (Arabic: محمد الطراد) is a French-Syrian billionaire businessman, rugby chairman and writer, born c. March 1948. He was born to a very young mother and his father gave him away to his grandparents aged four following his mother's death. In 2015, Altrad was named Ernst & Young World Entrepreneur Of The Year. As of 2026, Forbes estimates his net worth at 6.7$ billion.

== Biography ==
Mohed Altrad spent part of his youth in Raqqa, Syria. He passed the baccalaureate at 17, and was awarded a scholarship of 200 francs from the Syrian government to study in France. He obtained a diploma from Paris Dauphine University (MIAGE 1975). He is unsure of his date of birth, so he "picked a date from a hat" in order to celebrate one.

== Career ==
Altrad began working for the Abu Dhabi National Oil Company, which he left to buy a scaffolding company in France in 1985. This acquisition grew into the present-day Altrad Group, employer of 65,000 people distributed in more than 50 countries as of 2025, and involved in the scaffolding and cement-mixing industries. Altrad remains chairman of his namesake company, as well as the rugby club Montpellier Hérault Rugby. He has also written three novels.

In December 2022, Altrad received an 18-month suspended sentence and a €50,000 fine after he and French Rugby Federation president Bernard Laporte were found guilty of corruption relating to Altrad Group rugby shirt sponsorship deals.

In August 2024, he became the primary sponsor of Garioch Ladies Rugby Football Club (RFC) in Inverurie, northwest of Aberdeen, Scotland.

== Published works ==
=== Novels ===
- Badawi (Actes Sud), 2002
- L’hypothèse de Dieu (Actes Sud), 2006
- La Promesse d’Annah (Actes Sud), 2012

=== Essays ===
- Stratégie de groupe (Chotard), 1990.
- Écouter, Harmoniser, Diriger (Presses de la Cité) 1992.
- Le management d’un groupe international : vers la pensée multiple (Eska) with Carole Richard, 2008.
