= Hélène Mandroux =

French politician (born 1940)

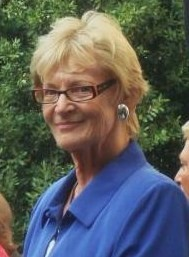

Mayor of Montpellier
- In office 2004–2014
- Preceded by: Georges Frêche
- Succeeded by: Philippe Saurel

Personal details
- Born: 1 December 1940 (age 85) Montpellier, France
- Party: Socialist Party (PS)
- Education: University of Montpellier
- Profession: Physician

Hélène Mandroux-Colas (born 1 December 1940) is a French politician. A member of the Socialist Party (PS) since 1982, her career in Montpellier debuted in Georges Frêche's municipal administration. Frêche gave her important responsibilities such as finances, municipal staff, legal affairs since 1995, and vice-mayor from 2001. She became mayor of Montpellier in 2004, following the resignation of Frêche, who could not cumulate the job as mayor with his new role as President of the Languedoc-Roussillon Region. She defeated her UMP opponent Jacques Domergue in a three-way runoff during the 2008 French municipal elections.

Within the party, she was a supporter of Ségolène Royal at the Reims Congress, and became one of Royal's major regional allies with Gérard Collomb and Jean-Noël Guérini. Despite being close to Frêche in the past, she has recently distanced herself from him following his notoriously controversial remarks. On 28 January 2010, following controversial comments made by Frêche about Laurent Fabius, Martine Aubry asked Mandroux to form a list supported by the party for the 2010 regional elections. Her list received the endorsement of the PS against Frêche's dissident list, but did not prevent Frêche from retaining the presidency of the region.
