= Dominique Voynet =

French politician

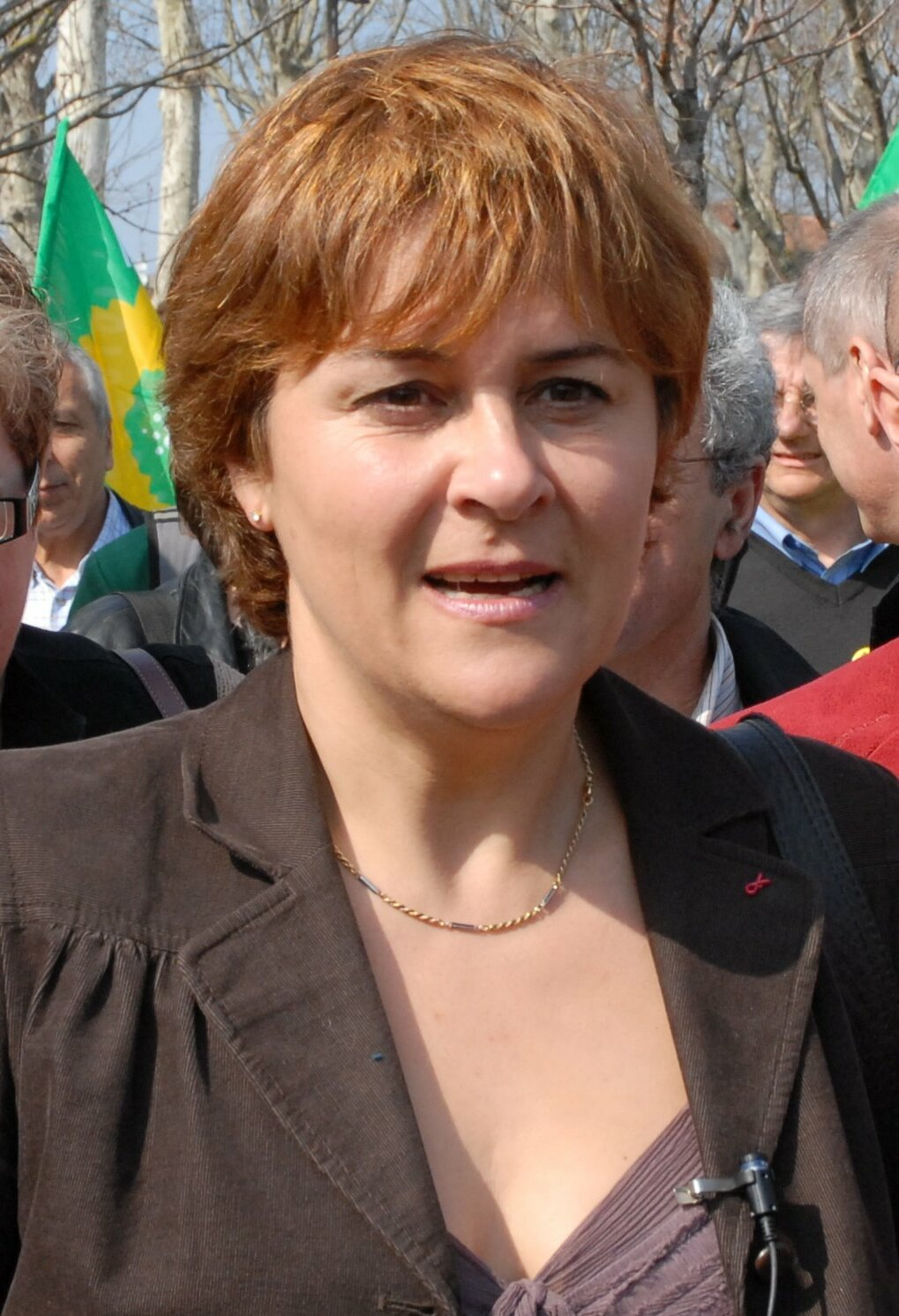

Member of the National Assembly
- Incumbent
- Assumed office 8 July 2024
- Election: 7 July 2024
- National Assembly: 17th (Fifth Republic)
- Preceded by: Éric Alauzet
- Constituency: Doubs's 2nd
- In office 1 June 1997 – 4 July 1997
- Election: 1 June 1997
- National Assembly: 11th (Fifth Republic)
- Government: Jospin
- Preceded by: Gilbert Barbier
- Succeeded by: André Vauchez
- Constituency: Jura's 3rd

Director of Mayotte Regional Health Agency
- In office 1 September 2019 – 1 February 2021
- Preceded by: Office created
- Succeeded by: Stéphane Fréchet (acting); Olivier Brahic

Mayor of Montreuil
- In office 22 March 2008 – 4 April 2014
- Preceded by: Jean-Pierre Brard
- Succeeded by: Patrice Bessac

Member of the Senate
- In office 26 September 2004 – 30 September 2011
- Parliamentary group: SOC
- Constituency: Seine-Saint-Denis

Minister of the Environment and Territorial planning
- In office 4 June 1997 – 9 July 2001
- President: Jacques Chirac
- Prime Minister: Lionel Jospin
- Preceded by: Jean-Claude Gaudin (Territorial planning); Corinne Lepage (Environnement)
- Succeeded by: Yves Cochet

Member of the European Parliament
- In office 13 November 1991 – 10 December 1991
- Preceded by: Solange Fernex
- Succeeded by: Marie-Anne Isler-Béguin
- Parliamentary group: The Greens
- Constituency: France

Personal details
- Born: 4 November 1958 (age 67) Montbéliard, France
- Party: Europe Écologie–The Greens
- Profession: Physician

Dominique Voynet (born 4 November 1958) is a French politician who is a member of Europe Écologie–The Greens. She is the former mayor of Montreuil and was a French senator for the département of Seine-Saint-Denis.

== Life ==
Dominique Voynet trained as a doctor, specifically as an anesthetist. During her studies in the late 1970s, she began participating in environmental activism. She fought against the establishment of nuclear reactors in Fessenheim and Malville, and the deforestation of the Vosges area on behalf of the Belfort Association for the Protection of Nature.

She also became a member of Amnesty International and the French Democratic Confederation of Labour (CFDT). In her student years, she was a broadcaster for an independent radio station, "Radio ondes rouges" (Red Radio Waves). Her pacifist and environmental efforts continued with her membership of Front de lutte antimilitariste (FLAM, "Front for the Antimilitarist Struggle") and Friends of the Earth.

Politics tempted her at this time, however the issues that were dear to her – social efforts, peace and environmentalism – were not represented in France by any party at the time. For this reason, she became one of the founding members of The Greens in France.

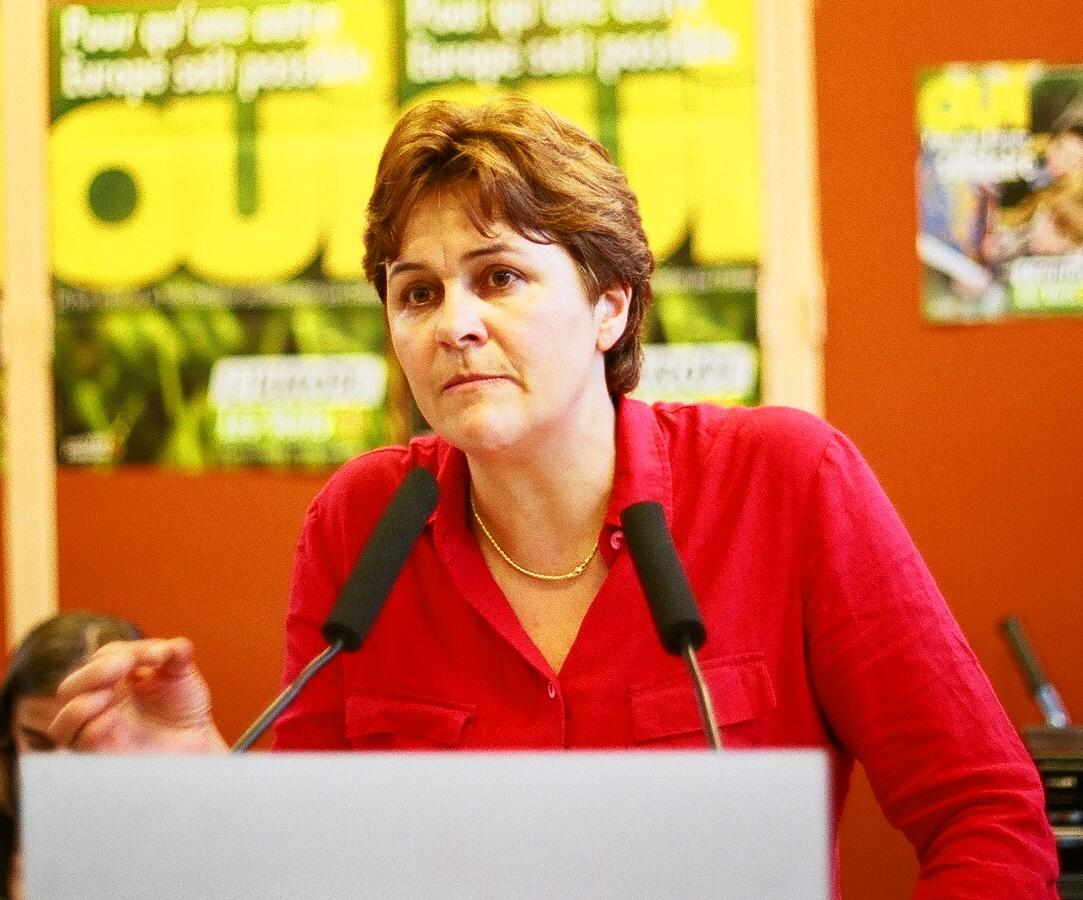
Voynet in 2005

In 1989 she was elected a Member of the European Parliament. From 1992 to 1994 she was a member of the conseil régional (regional council) of Franche-Comté.

She contested the 1995 presidential election which raised her public profile across all of France. In the first round of voting, she won 3.32% of the vote.

She was elected mayor of Montreuil sous bois in the Seine Saint Denis on the second round of Municipal elections, 16 March 2008, defeating Jean Pierre Brard longstanding communist mayor since 1984.

From 1997 to 2001 she was Minister of the Environment and Regional Planning under the Lionel Jospin government, she resigned on 9 July 2001 and was replaced by Yves Cochet. In 2004, she was elected senator for the Seine-Saint-Denis département. Since the 2008 French municipal elections she is the elected mayor of Montreuil.

Dominique Voynet was designated the Green candidate for the 2007 presidential election on 19 July 2006. In the first round of the election, she garnered 576,666 votes (1.57%), failing to reach the second round.

On 25 November 2013 Voynet announced she would not seek a second term as mayor of Montreuil, complaining of the "degradation of political life" in Montreuil and elsewhere.

On 1 January 2020, Voynet became the Director of Mayotte Regional Health Agency.

== Political positions ==
In a 2016 op-ed published by Sunday newspaper Le Journal du Dimanche, Voynet joined sixteen other high-profile women from across the political spectrum – including Élisabeth Guigou, Christine Lagarde, and Valérie Pécresse – in making a public vow to expose "all sexist remarks, inappropriate gestures and behaviour."

== Political career ==
Governmental function

Minister of Planning and Environment : 1997–2001.

Electoral mandates

European Parliament

Member of European Parliament : 1989–1991 (Resignation). Elected in 1989.

Senate of France

Senator of Seine-Saint-Denis : 2004–2011. Elected in 2004.

General Council

General councillor of Jura (department) : 1998–2004.

Regional Council

Regional councillor of Franche-Comté : 1992–1994 (Resignation).

Municipal Council

Mayor of Montreuil, Seine-Saint-Denis : 2008–2014.

Municipal councillor of Dole, Jura : 1989–2004 (Resignation). Reelected in 1995, 2001.

== See also ==
=== Bibliography ===
- Voix off (Voices Off)
- L'eau, numéro 22 (Water, Number 22)
- Qui êtes-vous, que proposez-vous ? (Who are you, what do you propose?)

=== Works about Dominique Voynet ===
- Dominique Voynet : Une vraie nature (Dominique Voynet: Her True Nature) by Murielle Szac
