= Émile-Roger Lombertie =

French politician (born 1951)

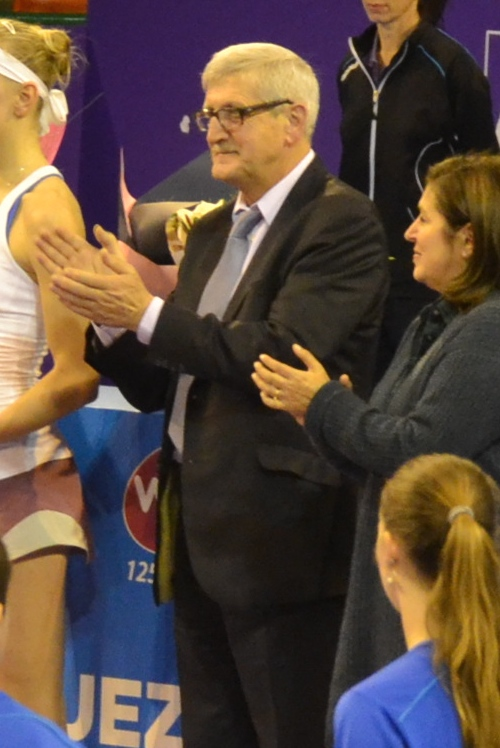
- Lombertie in 2014

Mayor of Limoges
- In office 4 April 2014 – 27 March 2026
- Preceded by: Alain Rodet
- Succeeded by: Guillaume Guérin

Personal details
- Born: 20 February 1951 (age 75) Champsac, France
- Party: UMP; The Republicans
- Occupation: Politician; Physician

Émile-Roger Lombertie (born 20 February 1951) is a French politician and physician.

He is current member of the Union for a Popular Movement Party and served as mayors of Limoges since 2014. He was elected mayor of Limoges by the municipal council on April 4, 2014. Émile Roger Lombertie then became the first mayor from the Limoges right, for 102 years and with the exception of the parenthesis André Faure during the Occupation. He became involved in politics during the 2014 municipal elections in Limoges. He was elected 8th vice-president of the Limoges Métropole urban community on 15 April 2014.

== Biography ==
Emile was born in Champsac, France on 1951. Emile-Roger Lombertie works as a psychiatrist, head of hospital at the Limoges-Esquirol hospital. He is also noted for the promulgation of disputed by-laws aimed at limiting prostitution and begging in the city center.

Political offices
Preceded by Alain Rodet	Mayor of Limoges; 4 April 2014	Succeeded by Incumbent
