= Jean-Marie Rausch =

French politician (1929–2024)

Minister of Foreign Trade
- In office 28 June 1988 – 15 May 1991
- President: François Mitterrand
- Prime Minister: Michel Rocard
- Preceded by: Roger Fauroux
- Succeeded by: Jean-Noël Jeanneney

Mayor of Metz
- In office 1971–2008
- Preceded by: Raymond Mondon
- Succeeded by: Dominique Gros

Personal details
- Born: 24 September 1929 Sarreguemines, France
- Died: 5 January 2024 (aged 94) France
- Party: DVD

Jean-Marie Rausch (French pronunciation: [ʒɑ̃ maʁi ʁoʃ]; 24 September 1929 – 5 January 2024) was a French politician who served as the French Minister of Foreign Trade from 1988 to 1991. He became a Knight of the Legion of Honour in 2002. Rausch was born in Sarreguemines on 24 September 1929, and died on 5 January 2024, at the age of 94.
