= Michaël Delafosse =

French politician (born 1977)

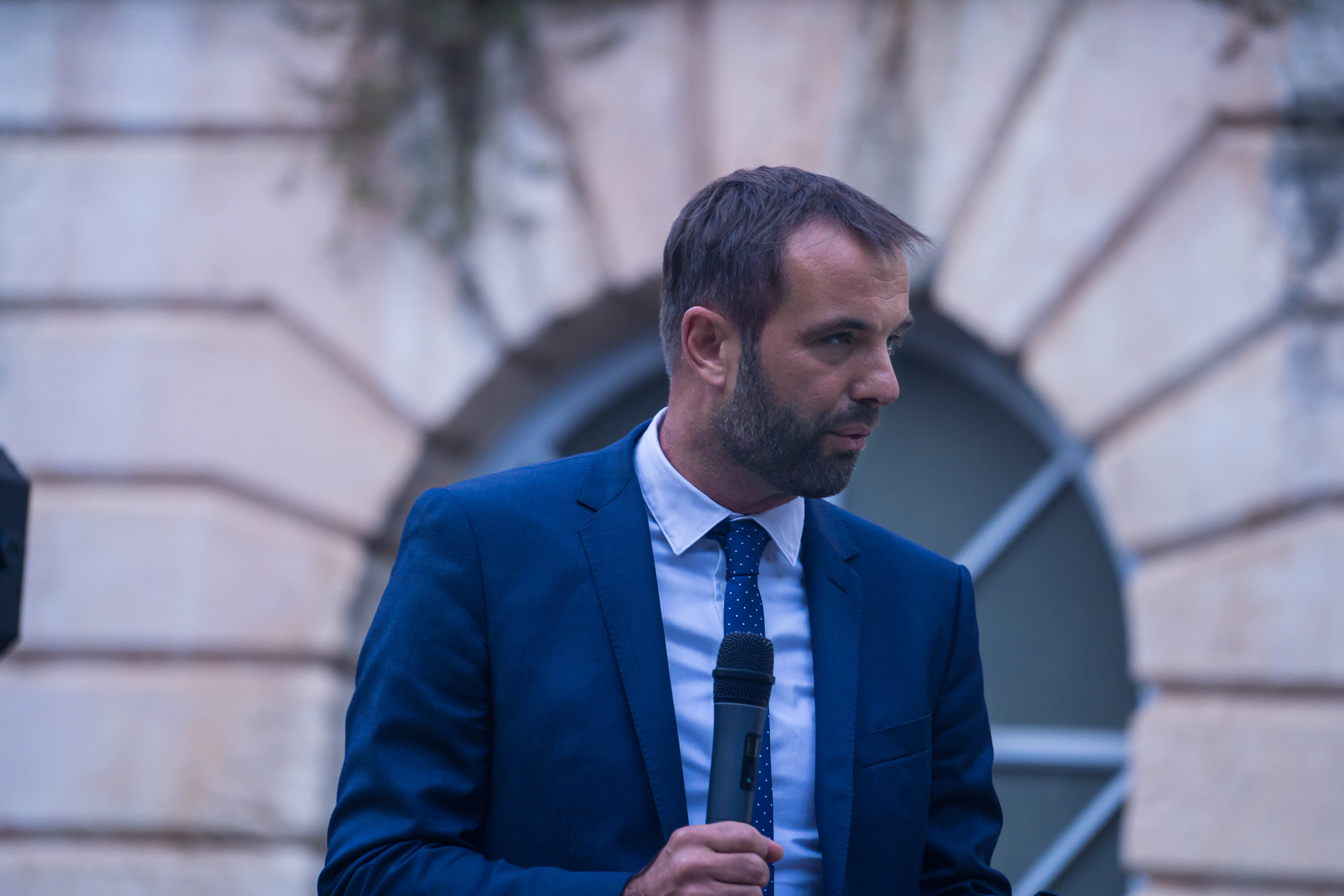
- Delafosse in 2022

Mayor of Montpellier
- Incumbent
- Assumed office 4 July 2020
- Preceded by: Philippe Saurel

Personal details
- Born: 13 April 1977 (age 49)
- Party: Socialist Party

Michaël Delafosse (born 13 April 1977) is a French politician serving as mayor of Montpellier since 2020.

== Political career ==
From 2015 to 2020, Delafosse was a member of the Departmental Council of Hérault and served as vice president for finance. From 1995 to 1997, he served as president of the Union Nationale Lycéenne.

== Political positions ==
Delafosse endorsed Anne Hidalgo as the Socialist Party’s candidate for the 2022 presidential election. In July 2021, he told Le Figaro that Prime Minister Jean Castex “will one day be seen as one of the best prime ministers of the Fifth Republic, because he is so attuned to the concerns of local councillors.”
