= Benoît Arrivé =

French politician (born 1975)

Mayor of Cherbourg-en-Cotentin
- Incumbent
- Assumed office 3 January 2016
- Preceded by: Position established

Personal details
- Born: 8 March 1975 (age 51)
- Party: Socialist Party

Benoît Arrivé (born 8 March 1975) is a French politician serving as mayor of Cherbourg-en-Cotentin since 2016. From 2015 to 2021, he was a member of the Regional Council of Normandy. In 2012, he was elected leader of the Socialist Party in Manche. In 2023, he was elected national secretary for industry of the Socialist Party.
