= Jacques Colombier =

French politician

Jacques Colombier is a French politician and a member of National Front.

As the FN's top candidate in Aquitaine in the 2004 regional elections he won 11.45% of the votes in the first round and 11.67% in the runoff. He was elected regional councillor.

In 2009, he was selected to be National Front's candidate in Aquitaine for the 2010 regional elections.
