= Hubert Falco =

French politician

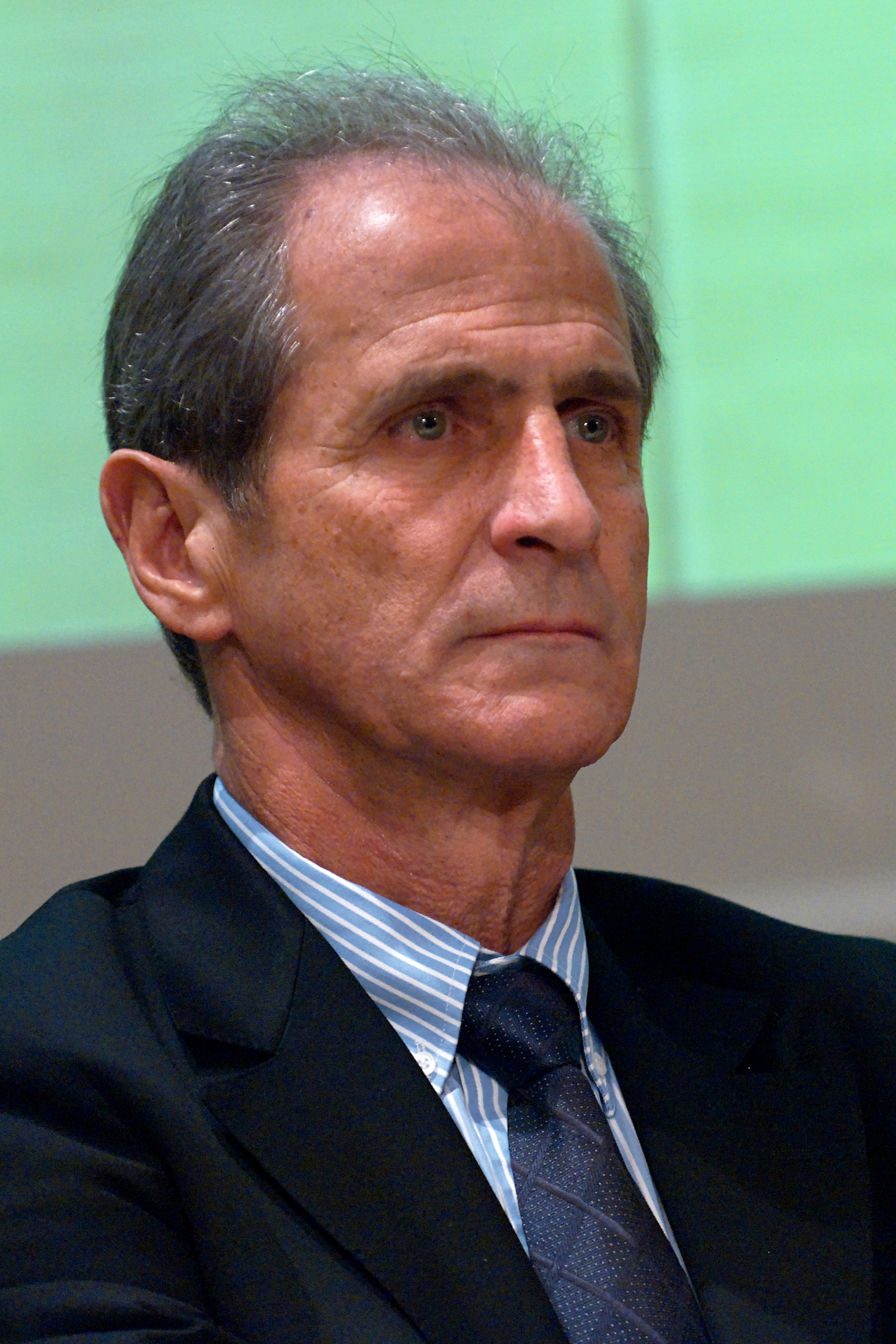
- Hubert Falco in 2008

Mayor of Toulon
- In office 18 March 2001 – 19 April 2023
- Preceded by: Jean-Marie Le Chevallier

Personal details
- Born: 15 May 1947 (age 79) Pignans, France
- Party: Horizons (2021–present); The Republicans (2015–2021)

Hubert Falco (born 15 May 1947) is a French politician who has been appointed Secretary of State for development of the territory in the government of François Fillon on 18 March 2008. He was the mayor of Toulon from 2001 to 2023.

In 1985, Hubert Falco joined the UDF after being approached by François Léotard, the leader of the Republican Party and deputy mayor of Fréjus. That same year, Toulon’s mayor, Maurice Arreckx, launched an electoral campaign to take the presidency of the general council from the left. Falco emerged as the winning candidate for Arreckx's camp in the canton of Besse-sur-Issole, leading to a shift of the Var general council to the right, with Arreckx becoming its president.

In 1992, Arreckx appointed Hubert Falco as his first vice-president and informally designated him as his successor. However, in 1994, after a decade in office, Arreckx was defeated in his canton, and Falco took over as the head of the local assembly.
