= Patrice Bessac =

French politician (born 1978)

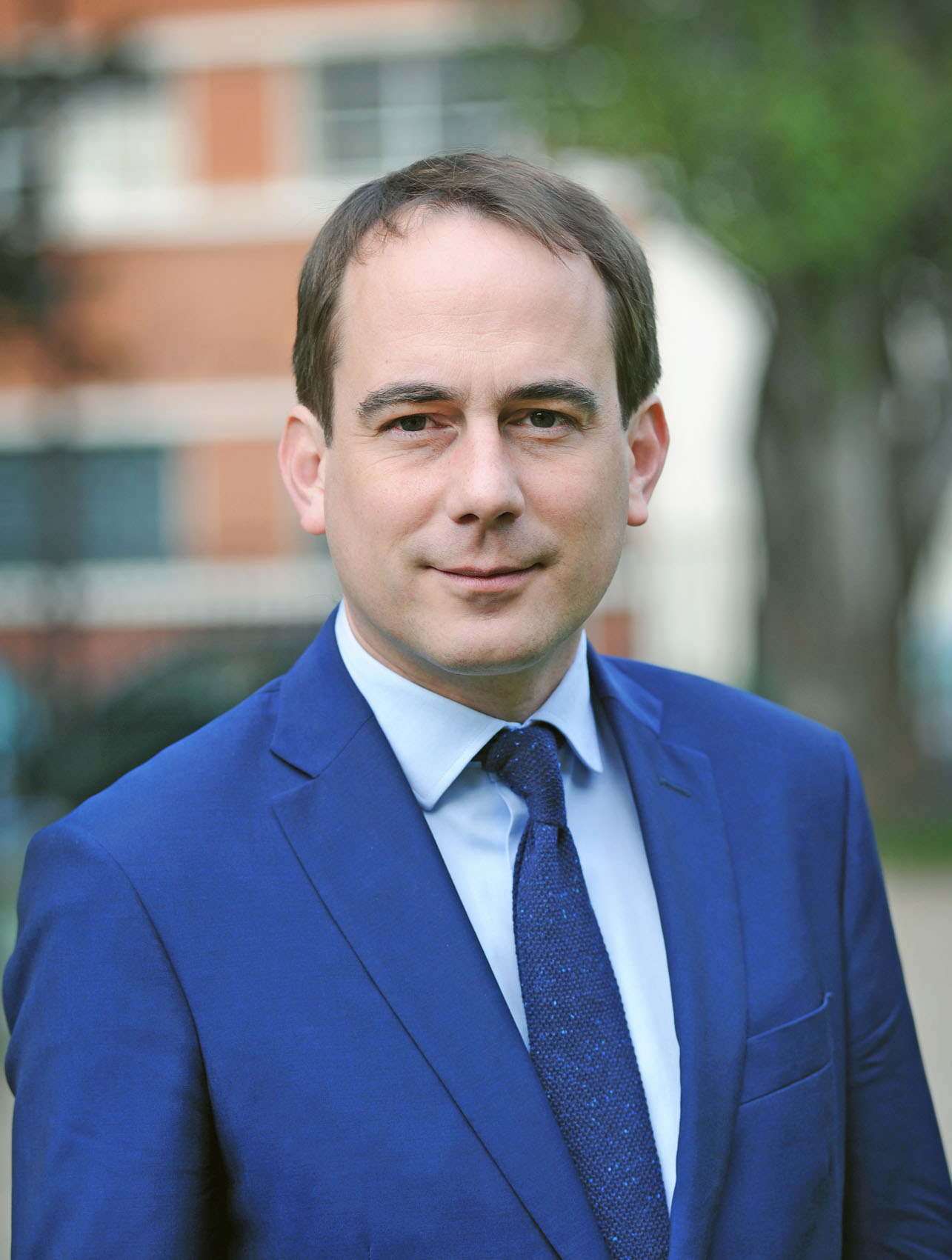
- Bessac in 2014

Mayor of Montreuil
- Incumbent
- Assumed office 4 July 2020
- Preceded by: Dominique Voynet

Personal details
- Born: 17 June 1978 (age 47)
- Party: French Communist Party

Patrice Bessac (born 17 June 1978) is a French politician of the French Communist Party. Since 2014, he has served as mayor of Montreuil in Seine-Saint-Denis. From 2004 to 2015, he was a member of the Regional Council of Île-de-France. From 2006 to 2017, he served as spokesperson of the French Communist Party.
