= Dominique Gros =

French politician (born 1943)

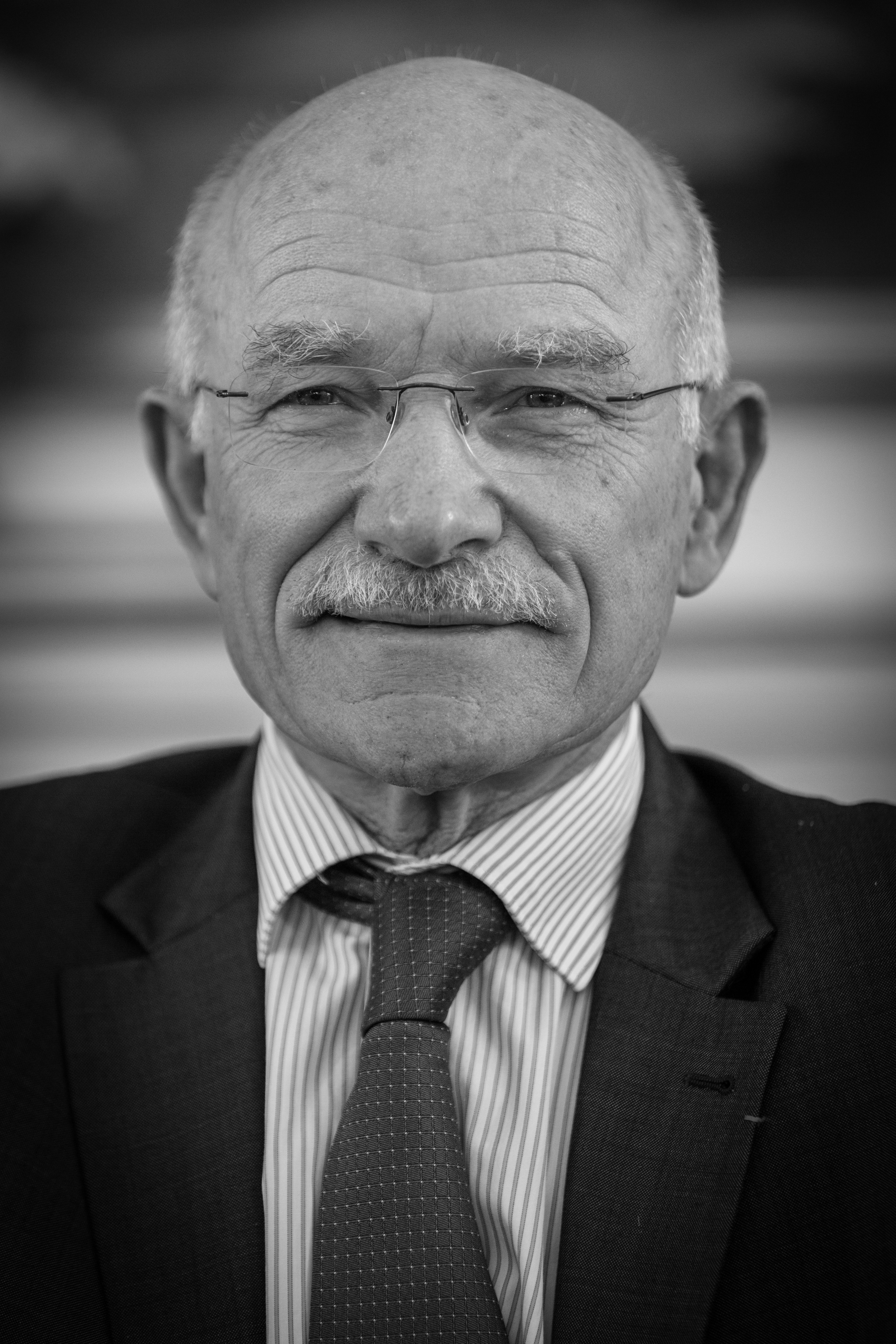
- Dominique Gros in 2015

Mayor of Metz
- In office 21 March 2008 – 28 June 2020
- Preceded by: Jean-Marie Rausch
- Succeeded by: François Grosdidier

Personal details
- Born: 2 January 1943 (age 83) Riom, France
- Party: Socialist Party
- Profession: Engineer

Dominique Gros (French pronunciation: [dɔminik ɡʁo]; born 2 January 1943) is a French politician. He was the mayor of Metz between 2008 and 2020.
