= Gaël Perdriau =

French politician

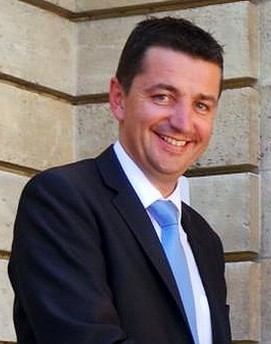
- Perdriau in 2013

Mayor of Saint-Étienne
- In office 4 April 2014 – 3 December 2025
- Preceded by: Maurice Vincent
- Succeeded by: Sylvie Fayolle

Personal details
- Born: 8 July 1972 (age 54) Cholet, France
- Party: The Republicans
- Education: ESC Saint-Étienne

Gaël Perdriau (French pronunciation: [ɡaɛl pɛʁdʁijo]; born 8 July 1972) is a French politician and former mayor of Saint-Étienne.

In 2022, the police started an investigation into Perdriau after it was claimed he was involved in a plot to film the “erotic massage” given by an escort boy to his deputy, Gilles Artigues, in a Paris hotel room in 2014. The tape was used to blackmail him for eight years to stop him from challenging Perdiau until the recording was publicized by a French news site in 2022. After the story broke, Artigues filed a criminal lawsuit against both Perdriau and his chief of staff, alleging “aggravated blackmail, the organization of an ambush and embezzlement”. The suit, in turn, sparked a judicial investigation. Both accused men denied the claims.

On 1 December 2025, a court in Lyon found Perdriau guilty of blackmailing the said political opponent, embezzling public funds, and criminal conspiracy. He was ordered to resign with immediate effect.
