= Jean-Paul Fournier =

French politician

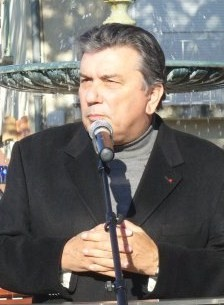

Mayor of Nîmes
- In office 18 March 2001 – 27 March 2026
- Preceded by: Alain Clary
- Succeeded by: Vincent Bouget

Member of the French Senate for Gard
- In office 2008–2017
- Succeeded by: Pascale Bories

Personal details
- Born: 16 October 1945 (age 81) Génolhac, France
- Party: The Republicans

Jean-Paul Fournier (born 16 October 1945) is a French politician who has served as the mayor of Nîmes (2001-2026). From 2008 to 2018, he was a member of the Senate of France, representing the Gard department. He is a member of The Republicans.

Ahead of the 2022 presidential elections, Fournier publicly declared his support for Michel Barnier as the Republicans’ candidate.

== Bibliography ==
- Page on the Senate website
