= Éric Piolle =

French politician (born 1973)

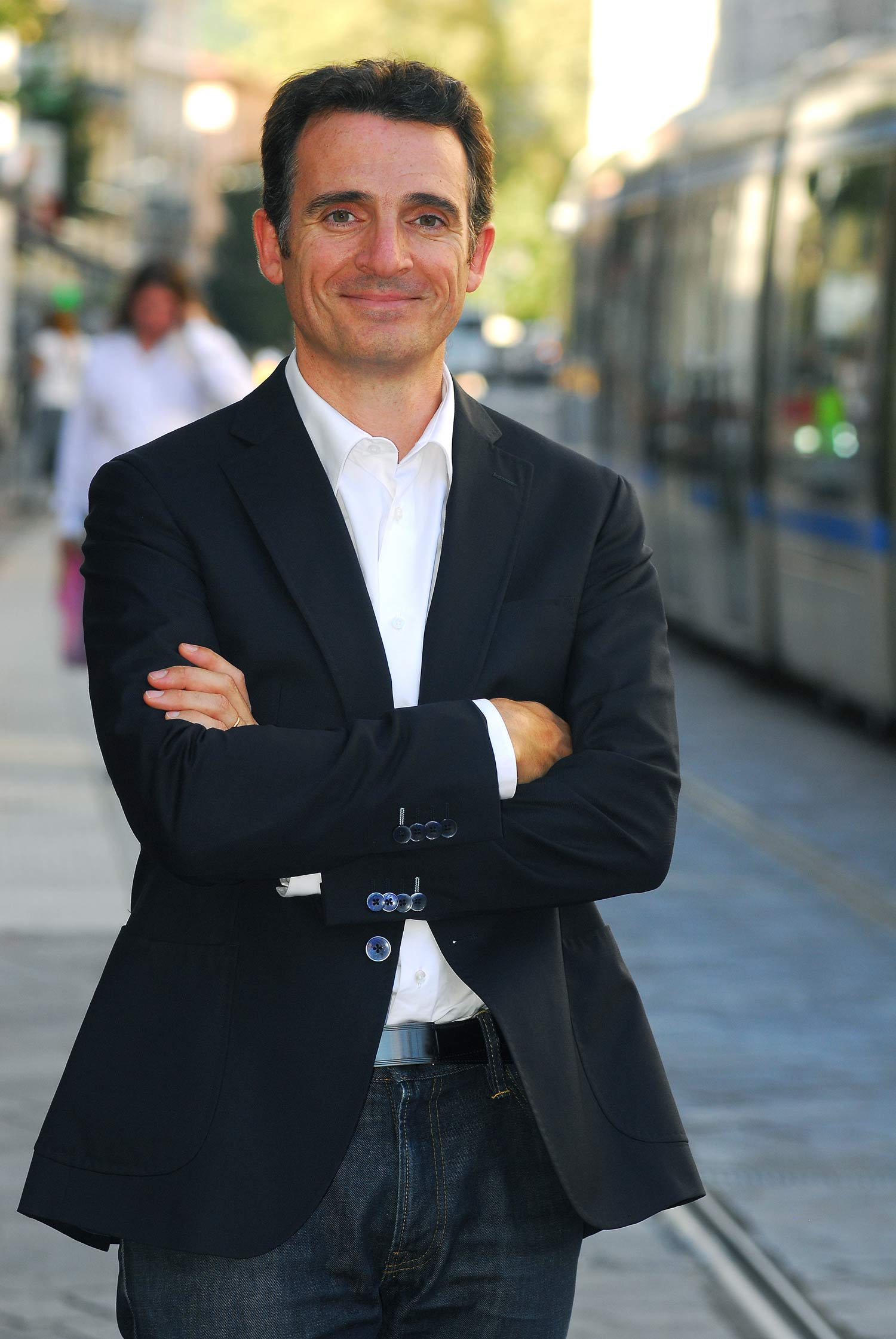
- Éric Piolle in 2013

Mayor of Grenoble
- In office 4 April 2014 – 27 March 2026
- Preceded by: Michel Destot
- Succeeded by: Laurence Ruffin

Personal details
- Born: 6 January 1973 (age 53) Pau, France
- Party: Europe Ecology – The Greens

Éric Piolle (French pronunciation: [eʁik pjɔl]; born 6 January 1973) is a French politician of The Ecologists (LE) who served as the mayor of Grenoble from 2014 to 2026. He was Regional Councillor of Rhône-Alpes from March 2010 to April 2014.

== Education and business career ==
Piolle was born in Pau, France where he attended Lycée Louis-Barthou. After graduating, he went to the Grenoble Institute of Technology to study engineering.

He joined the Hewlett-Packard Company in 2001, and became a senior manager at the Grenoble site. In February 2011, he was fired for refusing to set up a relocation plan.

He co-founded the company Raise Partners, a company specializing in financial risk management.

== Political career ==
=== Early beginnings ===
In 1997, at 24, Piolle was a parliamentary candidate for the eighth district of Isère as a Miscellaneous left, he won 1.35% of the votes. In 2002 he was a substitute candidate during the legislative elections for the first district of Isère.

In March 2010, Piolle was elected as a regional councilor of Isère, which is a department in the Rhône-Alpes region, as a member of Europe Ecology.

In June 2012, Piolle was a parliamentary candidate for the first district of Isère as a member of EELV, he won 7.7% of votes.

=== Mayor of Grenoble ===
In 2014, Piolle became a candidate for mayor of Grenoble during the municipal elections, his motto being "Grenoble, Une Ville pour Tous" (Grenoble, A City for All). He was the leading candidate throughout the race, gathering support from environmentalists, EELV, the Left Party, The Alternatives, the Anticapitalist Left, and two local associations, ADES and the Citizen Network. He was elected during a city council session on 4 April 2014, succeeding Michel Destot (PS) as mayor of Grenoble. He received 50 votes out of the 59 councilors. After this election Grenoble became the first French city with more than 100 000 inhabitants to elect an EELV municipal government.

After winning the election, Piolle declined to run for president of Grenoble-Alpes Métropole, and resigned from his position as a regional councilor of Rhône-Alpes.

In the French presidential election of 2017, Piolle called on voters to support Jean-Luc Mélenchon.

Following a proposal by Piolle, the municipal council of Grenoble voted in favour of allowing the use of body-covering "burkini" bathing suits for women in municipal pools in May 2022, sparking protest from conservative and far-right politicians. In response, Minister of the Interior Gérald Darmanin filed an objection against the burkini permit. Shortly after, a French administrative court suspended the city of Grenoble's decision.
