= Philippe Saurel =

French politician

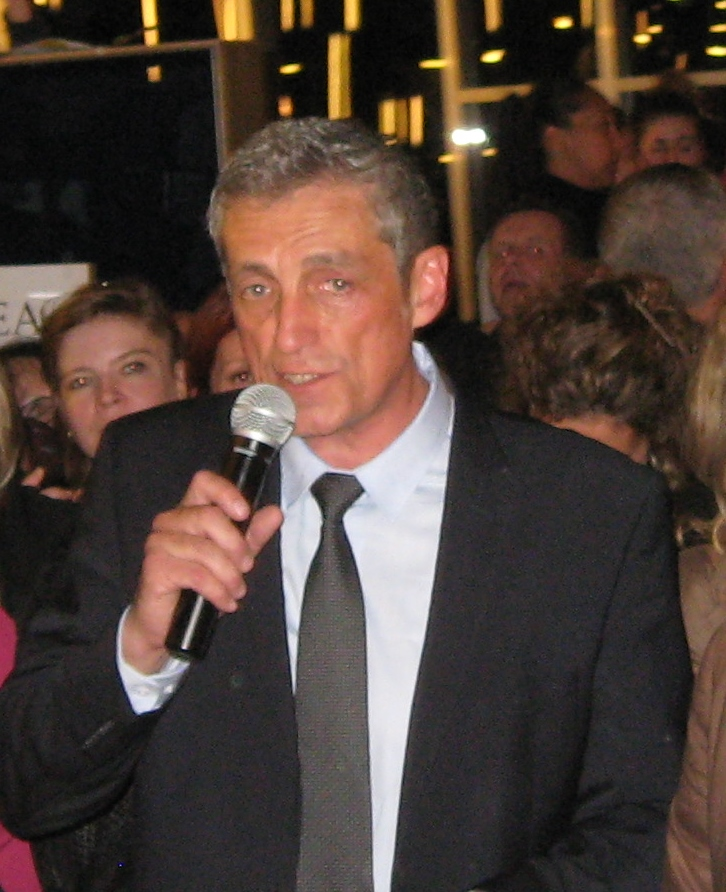
- Philippe Saurel in 2019.

Mayor of Montpellier
- In office 5 April 2014 – 4 July 2020
- Preceded by: Hélène Mandroux
- Succeeded by: Michaël Delafosse

Personal details
- Born: 17 December 1957 (age 68) Montpellier, France
- Party: Socialist Party (1994-2014); Miscellaneous left (2014-present)
- Education: Lycée Joffre
- Profession: Dentist

Philippe Saurel (French pronunciation: [filip sɔʁɛl]; born 17 December 1957) is a French politician, mayor of Montpellier between 2014 and 2020.

== Political Accomplishments ==
Chairman of the Supervisory Board of Montpellier University Hospital since December 2014. He was elected Mayor of the City of Montpellier by the Municipal Council on April 5, 2014. President of Montpellier Agglomération and President of Montpellier Méditerranée Métropole since January 2015. Chairman of the Board of Directors of ACM Habitat, Public Housing Office of Montpellier Méditerranée Métropole, since 2016.
