= Matthieu Raffray =

French traditionalist Catholic priest and Thomist scholar

- Church: Catholic Church
- Other post: Superior of the Institute of the Good Shepherd for Europe (as of 2024)

Orders
- Ordination: 2009

Personal details
- Born: 1979 (age 46–47)
- Denomination: Catholic (traditionalist)
- Occupation: Priest, philosopher, social media influencer
- Education: Master's degree in mathematics Doctorate in medieval philosophy (2015)

Philosophical work
- Era: Contemporary philosophy
- School: Thomism
- Main interests: Metaphysics, medieval philosophy

Matthieu Raffray (born 1979) is a French traditionalist Catholic priest and a member of the Institute of the Good Shepherd. He has written on the metaphysics of Thomas Aquinas and Albertus Magnus, and has taught at the Angelicum and the Catholic University of Toulouse. He trained at the seminary of the Society of Saint Pius X (SSPX), from which he was expelled, and was ordained a priest in 2009.

He is one of the most widely followed Catholic influencers in France and, on his social media accounts, advocates a conservative and anti-modern form of Catholicism, which he presents as a bulwark against mass migration. He has made it his mission to evangelise identitarian and nationalist circles, and associates with several prominent figures within these groups. Political scientist Marion Jacquet-Vaillant sees him as a bridge between identitarian and traditionalist circles.

== Biography ==
=== Early life and education ===
Matthieu Raffray was born in 1979, the third of nine children. He has described his family as belonging to the most conventional Catholic right. His parents follow Archbishop Marcel Lefebvre and are attached to the Society of Saint Pius X, out of pastoral necessity according to him.

He holds a master's degree in mathematics and failed the entrance examination for the Louis-Lumière school. At the age of 24, he entered the SSPX seminary at Écône, Switzerland. He was dismissed four years later for "liberalism", because he supported a rapprochement with Pope Benedict XVI, who authorised the Tridentine Mass again in 2007. He completed his training at the Institute of the Good Shepherd, founded in 2006 by former members of the SSPX who reconciled with the Church of Rome, and was ordained a priest there in 2009. He then continued his studies with the Dominicans of Toulouse, at the Saint Thomas Aquinas Institute. In 2015, he defended a doctoral thesis in medieval philosophy.

=== Ministry ===
In 2021, he launched the Hussards autumn camp, open to boys aged 16 to 23, whose programme includes prayers, a lecture by Victor Aubert, president of Academia Christiana, and an introduction to shooting. Far-right video makers Baptiste Marchais and Christopher Lannes were also invited.

In 2023, he taught at the faculties of theology at the Angelicum and the Catholic University of Toulouse. On Pentecost of that same year, he delivered the homily at the Mass of the Chartres pilgrimage, organised by the traditionalist association Notre-Dame de Chrétienté, which gathered 16,000 walkers that year. As of 2024, he is superior of the Institute of the Good Shepherd for Europe.

He says he no longer has any connection with the SSPX, which he considers sectarian, but calls Archbishop Lefebvre a "prophet" without whom, in his view, the Latin Mass would have disappeared.

=== Social media activity ===
In 2020, following governance disputes within his community, Raffray opened an Instagram account. In 2024, his YouTube channel had accumulated nearly 800,000 views. La Croix then counted him among the most followed Catholic influencers in France, alongside Brother Paul-Adrien d'Hardemare and Sister Albertine Debacker. According to Le Canard enchaîné, his audience has grown markedly since he began appearing regularly on CNews. His Instagram account grew from 74,000 followers in 2024 to nearly 200,000 in 2026, and he had 32,500 followers on X that same year. The weekly noted that he was still active on Instagram, even though in 2024 he said he wanted to leave the platform once he reached the 100,000-follower mark, for fear that people would become attached to his person. He has also created a podcast of about a hundred episodes on the catechism and answers questions on social issues in filmed interviews.

On social media, he promotes a conservative and anti-modern Catholicism that he wants to be "virile". The hashtag #bagarrebagarreprière ("fight, fight, prayer"), which he created, serves as his online signature. According to La Croix, he uses social media to present Catholicism as a bulwark against atheistic materialism, Islamisation and mass migration, and to urge Christianity to distance itself from the philosophy of the Enlightenment.

In 2021, he posted a photo of himself on Instagram holding a pump-action shotgun, captioned "Now that's a proper 14 July… One has to practise". He told Charlie Hebdo that the photo was taken during a clay pigeon shooting session. He also posted another photo, later deleted, with a sniper rifle.

== Works ==
=== Actus essendi ===
At Easter 2014, Raffray organised a conference in Bordeaux on the notion of actus essendi ("act of being") in Thomas Aquinas. It brought together representatives of the various tendencies that divide Thomists on the question of the principle of the metaphysical constitution of beings.

The conference proceedings were published in 2019 under his editorship by Parole et Silence, in the "Sagesse et cultures" series, with a preface by Serge-Thomas Bonino. The book is divided into two parts, "Sources and texts" and "Interpretations". Raffray himself contributes a study of question 5, article 3 of Aquinas's commentary on Boethius's De Trinitate, drawing on Louis-Bertrand Geiger. He also examines the division of the sciences according to two or three degrees of abstraction, which varies among interpreters. In his introduction, Raffray identifies three questions under debate: the composition of the created being; the metaphysical issues linked to the analogy of being, to the relationship between philosophy and Revelation, and to Christology; and the relationship between Thomas Aquinas and Thomism.

In the Nouvelle Revue théologique, the Jesuit Hubert Jacobs praised Raffray's initiative and considered that the richness of the volume made it "a genuine summa of metaphysics". In the Revue des sciences religieuses, Isabelle Moulin wrote that the book sheds interesting light on Aquinas's "existentialism". She noted that a single book cannot exhaust the question, but that it is covered extensively, particularly with regard to Thomist commentators.

=== Métaphysique des relations ===
His thesis was published in 2023 by Vrin, in the "Bibliothèque thomiste" series, under the title Métaphysique des relations chez Albert le Grand et Thomas d'Aquin (Metaphysics of relations in Albertus Magnus and Thomas Aquinas). The first part traces the origins of the concept of relation among the Greek philosophers following Socrates, several Church Fathers (the Cappadocians, Dionysius, Augustine, Boethius), then Gilbert de la Porrée and Peter Lombard. The other three parts deal with the commentaries of Albertus Magnus and Thomas Aquinas on the Sentences, with the book translating and commenting on 31 texts.

Raffray contrasts two conceptions of relation: "relationalism", which places relation at the foundation of things, and "substantialism", which grounds relation in substance and regards it as ontologically secondary. According to him, this opposition goes back to Plato and Aristotle and runs through the entire history of philosophy and theology. Albertus Magnus and Thomas Aquinas ground relation in substance, whereas modern thought leans towards relationalism, to the point that the debate has reached the Thomist schools themselves.

For Pascal Ide, this historical approach serves a doctrinal thesis, the strict accidentality of relations and the primacy of substance in the Aristotelian sense. Ide considered the rereading of Antiquity and the Middle Ages illuminating up to the 13th century, but disputed that of modern history, particularly of German idealism. He also criticised the author for an overly binary opposition between relation and substance, and noted the absence of Heidegger's "nothingness" and of the Stoic pneuma.

== Views ==
Raffray asserts that a Christian cannot be left-wing or accept "mass migration". He holds that "the first act of humanity towards migrants is to allow them not to migrate". He denounces a "humanist Freemasonry", criticises the state's control of education and health, and argues that the state must defend Christian truth. Charlie Hebdo sees this as a challenge to the 1905 law on the Separation of the Churches and the State. He regularly cites the Cristero War, a Mexican Catholic uprising of the early 20th century, as an example. Among the enemies who, he says, will seek to silence the faithful, he lists communists, Freemasons, "globalists", "wokists" and progressives. In 2024, Raffray described homosexuality as a "vice" that "one can perfectly well fight against". Aurore Bergé, then minister in charge of combating discrimination, reported him to the prosecutor. The case was dismissed.

Having quoted Charles Maurras in an exchange with Éric Zemmour, he said he did not subscribe to all of Maurras's thought and had cited him for his analyses of authority, order and the common good. On the death of Jean-Marie Le Pen, he called him an "often misunderstood prophet" who had "courageously" defended "the values and identity of France". He also describes Louis XVI as a "martyr of fidelity and duty".

Raffray has said his mission is to evangelise identitarian and nationalist circles. He has claimed credit for the baptism of far-right YouTuber Papacito and the conversion of essayist Julien Rochedy, former national director of the Front national de la jeunesse, and has said he hopes to convert Zemmour. The publishing house founded by Rochedy published one of his books, Le Plus Grand des combats (The Greatest of Battles), which calls on young people to rediscover their "roots". Victor Aubert, president of the association Academia Christiana and a friend of Raffray, believes that he attracts young non-Christians searching for an identity. Raffray has spoken to Academia Christiana students. He has also posed alongside Alice Cordier, president of the Collectif Némésis, and appeared in a video with bodybuilding YouTuber Baptiste Marchais, whom Charlie Hebdo describes as a former neo-Nazi. Asked about these associations, he replied that no one should be deprived of the message of the Gospel. In June 2025, he organised a conference in Paris titled "Acting as a Christian for the common good". He spoke there alongside Yann Bompard, mayor of Orange from the League of the South, while billionaire Pierre-Édouard Stérin took part by videoconference.

Marion Jacquet-Vaillant, a senior lecturer in political science, sees him as a bridge between identitarian and traditionalist circles. She notes that the Institute of the Good Shepherd depends directly on the Holy See rather than on the Bishops' Conference of France, which leaves Raffray considerable freedom for political engagement. Historian Paul Airiau observes in his videos a reworking of the myth of chivalry aimed at a contemporary audience. Catholic philosopher Paul Colrat fears that he may instead be providing an "extra dose of soul" to the far right, and considers that his Christianity reinforces this audience's certainties without questioning them.

== Publications ==
- Raffray, Matthieu, ed. (2019). Actus essendi: Saint Thomas d'Aquin et ses interprètes. Sagesse et cultures (in French). Paris: Parole et Silence. ISBN 978-2-88959-020-9.
- Raffray, Matthieu (2023). Métaphysique des relations chez Albert le Grand et Thomas d'Aquin. Bibliothèque thomiste (in French). Paris: Vrin. ISBN 978-2-7116-2995-4.
- Raffray, Matthieu (2026). Le Plus Grand des combats (in French). Éditions Hétairie. ISBN 978-2-492571-07-7.
