= Killing of Quentin Deranque =

2026 killing in Lyon, France

Coordinates: 45°44′41.2″N 4°49′59.8″E

- Location: 7th arrondissement, Lyon, France
- Date: 12 February 2026; 9 months ago
- Target: Quentin Deranque
- Attack type: Beating
- Deaths: 1
- Accused: 13

On 12 February 2026, Quentin Deranque, a 23-year-old French far-right activist, was beaten by several far-left individuals in what has variously been described as a "brawl" between members of the far-right and the far-left, or as a "lynching", in Lyon, France. (Note: French media outlets, such as Ici, L'Humanité, Libération, La Provence, and StreetPress, use the term rixe ('brawl'), whereas the term lynchage ('lynching') is used by Le Figaro, Le Parisien, Le Progrès, and Le Monde. The newspaper Le Dauphiné libéré uses both, and BFM TV initially used rixe but has since switched to the term lynchage.) Deranque was there "to provide security" for the femonationalist group Collectif Némésis. Many of the arrested individuals were linked to the outlawed far-left militant anti-fascist collective Jeune Garde Antifasciste (English: Anti-Fascist Young Guard). Deranque died from brain injuries two days later in hospital.

Deranque's death, initially reported as an attack on an isolated victim, rather than a brawl between two armed groups, provoked national political reactions in the lead-up to the March 2026 French municipal elections and a minute of silence held in the National Assembly. Politically, Deranque's death led to the isolation of left-wing party La France Insoumise (LFI), as the party was close to the Jeune Garde. On 17 February 2026, LFI leader Jean-Luc Mélenchon reiterated his party's "great affection" for the Jeune Garde. In late February 2026, Mélenchon accused the far-right feminist collective Némésis of having deliberately organised a "trap" (traquenard) by using its members as bait to provoke clashes with antifascist militants around Rima Hassan's conference in Lyon.

Part of the French political class accused the far-left, or the ultra-left, of being responsible, while the public prosecutor office and the police sought to identify the perpetrators. Justice minister Gérald Darmanin and interior minister Laurent Nuñez both commented on the early progress of the investigation, claiming that the far-left was behind the attack. Citing videos of the event, several journalistic investigations gradually called into question the initial version of events by Némésis, particularly regarding who was responsible for the clashes between the two groups. Further investigations revealed that Némésis had repeatedly coordinated with far-right groups in Lyon to provoke clashes with left-wing activists.

== Quentin Deranque ==
The only known photo of Deranque

Deranque, originally from Saint-Cyr-sur-le-Rhône, Rhône department, was the 23-year-old son of a French father and a Peruvian mother. He was a mathematics student and far-right identitarian activist, belonging to the neo-fascist group Allobroges Bourgoin, based in Isère, and a former member of Action Française, according to Mediapart. The newspaper also reported that he participated in the 2025 edition of the 9 May Committee's neo-fascist rally.

A convert to Catholicism, Deranque was reportedly a parishioner at a church in Vienne and was involved with the Priestly Fraternity of Saint Peter, a traditionalist Catholic group, and the Catholic identitarian organization Academia Christiana. It was alleged that Deranque was acting as security to members of Némésis participating in the protest at the time of his death, which was denied by an acquaintance of Deranque, who also claimed that he was a pacifist and involved in the Saint-Martin shelter, which operates soup kitchens.

According to Le Monde, Deranque had previously been part of multiple far-right movements, including revolutionary nationalism, royalism, and neo-fascism. Mediapart found that Deranque had been an active participant in far-right circles on Twitter between 2023 and his death, in which he advocated a "racist and antisemitic ideology, built around a glorification of fascism and a nostalgia for Nazism." There he had described himself as a fascist, called for the Gayssot Act to be repealed, declared support for Adolf Hitler, recommended the works of Maurice Bardèche, and posted various racist and Islamophobic comments.

The only known authentic photo of Deranque was published by Le Figaro, and was provided by the family's lawyer. Many depictions of Deranque posted on social media were actually of Dylan Guichaoua, a local representative for the National Rally (RN), or of Belgian car accident victim Quentin Piron. Many of those images were modified by AI.

== Context ==
Lyon has historically been a stronghold of far-right groups in France, in particular since the 2000s, during which according to Rue89 Lyon, 102 far-right violent actions have taken place. News outlets, such as Libération in France and ABC in Spain, have characterised Lyon as the hotbed of political violence in France.

== Killing ==
On 12 February 2026, a lecture by La France Insoumise (LFI) MEP Rima Hassan was scheduled for 18:00 CET at the Institut d'études politiques de Lyon (IEP). According to the police, at c. 17:40, clashes broke out between two groups of demonstrators on the sidelines of a protest by the Collectif Némésis, a femonationalist organization, during which a banner reading "Islamo-leftists, out of our universities" was unfurled. Near the intersection of Boulevard Yves-Farge and Rue Victor Lagrange in the 7th arrondissement, 400 m (1,300 ft) from the lecture venue, at c. 17:53, a brawl between two groups started, after which Deranque was isolated and beaten by alleged antifascists while on the ground. Around 17:57, Deranque was seen lying down, unconscious, near 11 rue Victor Lagrange. After the attack, a friend tried to help Deranque home but Deranque's condition deteriorated on route. Firefighters were called an hour and a half later, at c. 19:40 to quai Fulchiron, nearly 2 kilometres away from the scene of the confrontation. Deranque was then taken to Édouard-Herriot Hospital in critical condition.

Deranque died two days later, on 14 February, from his injuries. The medical examiner who performed the autopsy stated that a major traumatic brain injury was the cause of death and determined that "the student had no chance of survival, even if he had been taken to the hospital immediately." According to Le Progrès, citing a source close to the investigation, two small groups of at least twenty people met a few hundred meters behind the political science school, behind the railway line. After these clashes, Deranque and another person left the area. According to the mother of a friend, as Deranque was returning home, he was isolated, beaten, then knocked to the ground, "lynched", and left for dead. The scene was filmed by a witness, and the video was circulated in the press. On 14 February, TF1 broadcast a video of the events showing about fifteen men beating three individuals.

== Investigation ==
According to press reports published in the days following the events, investigators quickly identified several suspected participants in the beating. Some were known to intelligence services due to their previous links with the Jeune Garde Antifasciste, a movement that was dissolved in 2025 by the French government. Public prosecutor Thierry Dran announced on 16 February that at least six people were thought to have participated in the attack on Deranque.

Between 17 and 18 February, eleven individuals associated with Jeune Garde were arrested in connection with Deranque's death, two of whom worked for MP Raphaël Arnault, the founder of the Jeune Garde and member of the left-wing party La France Insoumise. One of the arrested who worked as a parliamentary assistant for Raphaël Arnault withdrew from his duties as a parliamentary assistant "pending the investigation" while denying "being responsible" for the death of Deranque on 15 February prior to his arrest on 17 February.On 16 February, the president of the National Assembly suspended the accused's access to the Palais Bourbon, as his presence could cause "disturbances to public order". French police also stated that investigation will also cover aggravated violence against other victims during the same incident, and possibly other acts committed earlier that afternoon.

On 4 March 2026, the Rhône Territorial Crime Directorate (DCT) and the Anti-Terrorism Sub-Directorate (SDAT) arrested a 23-year-old man in the Lyon area and a 26-year-old man in the Aube department. The two arrested were accused of direct participation in the beating of Deranque, according to Agence France-Presse. Both were formally charged and placed in pretrial detention on 6 March.

As part of the ongoing investigation, officers from the territorial intelligence service (Renseignement territorial) conducted surveillance near Sciences Po Lyon and took approximately fifty photographs of around fifteen antifascist militants linked to the Jeune Garde. The images documented their movements over roughly 600 metres, including the moment they donned hoods (cagoules) and gloves in preparation for the confrontation, thereby highlighting their masked character. This photographic evidence was made public by BFM TV on 27 March 2026. French authorities also seized the mobile phones of several right-wing activists who were present on 12 February.

== Reactions ==
=== Domestic and political reactions ===
On the evening of Deranque's death, President Emmanuel Macron denounced "an unprecedented outburst of violence" and called for calm. A memorial gathering was organized that same afternoon in Angers. The entire political class joined the call for calm and condemned the brawl. La France Insoumise (LFI) condemned the violence and asserted that its security service was not involved. LFI became the target of political attacks because its leader Jean-Luc Mélenchon had fought against the government making the Jeune Garde an outlawed organisation, and one of its co-founders, Raphaël Arnault, sits as a LFI deputy in the National Assembly. In 2025, Mélenchon had called on LFI members to become involved with the Jeune Garde. After the Jeune Garde was outlawed by the government, LFI deputy Thomas Portes stated the Jeune Garde "will live on", while the European Parliament LFI leader Manon Aubry said: "Glory to the Jeune Garde." After Deranque's death, Mélenchon stood by his earlier comments, saying LFI had "great affection" for the Jeune Garde.In late February 2026, Mélenchon accused the far-right feminist collective Némésis of having deliberately organised a "trap" (traquenard) by using its members as bait to provoke clashes with anti-fascist militants around Rima Hassan's conference in Lyon. He called for the dissolution of Némésis. On 18 February 2026, the government spokesperson Maud Bregeon called on LFI to remove Arnault from its parliamentary group.

Socialist Party leader Olivier Faure stated "La France Insoumise cannot avoid a self-examination", adding the party "constantly [resorts] to excesses and [seeks] to create conflict between everything and its opposite." Former president François Hollande called on left-wing parties to no longer ally with LFI, stating that "they maintain a brutality in their expression, denunciation, accusations, excesses, and hurtful verbal formulas." Hollande was joined by Place Publique leader Raphaël Glucksmann in his call for other left-wing parties to no longer ally with LFI. The Ecologists (LÉ–EELV) leader Marine Tondelier called out LFI's "left-wing populism". Leader of The Republicans (LR) in the National Assembly Laurent Wauquiez said "it's not the police who kill, it's the far-left" and "today, the far-left has blood on its hands". Several figures and media outlets, ranging from president Macron, the government and the far-right, such as justice minister Gérald Darmanin, interior minister Laurent Nuñez, and Le Figaro, claimed that the killers were far-left. Nuñez stated on 15 February 2026 the Jeune Garde collective appeared to be "clearly" involved in the death, based on testimonies. On the evening of 15 February, a banner in tribute to Deranque was held up by Lyon supporters, probably the Bad Gones, shortly before the start of the football match between Olympique Lyonnais and OGC Nice.

Demonstrations in support of Deranque and demanding justice were organized in the following days in several French cities by royalist, nationalist, and identitarian groups. In Paris, a few hundred people gathered in front of the Sorbonne, later joined by elected officials and leaders of the French far-right, such as Éric Zemmour. The Rhône prefecture announced on Saturday that it intends to file a complaint with the courts regarding Nazi salutes and racist and homophobic insults detected in Lyon during the memorial. In Montpellier, about fifty demonstrators from the Ligue du Midi were disrupted by some twenty far-left activists, forcing the police to intervene. One person was arrested. During the night of 15–16 February, approximately ten LFI deputies' local offices were vandalized. Local elections in Lyon are scheduled for March 2026. After Deranque's death, candidates Alexander Dupalais (UDR-RN), Jean-Michel Aulas (miscellaneous right), and Anaïs Belouassa-Cherifi (LFI) suspended their campaigns, while incumbent Grégory Doucet (LÉ–EELV) pledged to support the investigation.

On 1 April 2026, Raphaël Arnault, LFI deputy and co-founder of the dissolved Jeune Garde, returned to the National Assembly. National Assembly President Yaël Braun-Pivet stated that, while legally permitted, "morally it is difficult for him to represent the Nation given this type of behaviour" and left the decision to Arnault's conscience.

=== International reactions ===
The Italian Prime Minister Giorgia Meloni wrote on social media that the killing of Deranque was "a wound for all of Europe" and part of "a climate of ideological hatred sweeping several nations". Macron responded: "I'm always struck by how people who are nationalists, who don't want to be bothered in their own country, are always the first ones to comment on what's happening in other countries." The Italian Minister of Foreign Affairs Antonio Tajani likened the killing to his country's Years of Lead, adding: "Condemning acts like this serves to prevent Italy from falling back into such a dark past."

The American embassy in France and the United States Department of State bureau of counter-terrorism announced they were monitoring the situation as "violent radical leftism is on the rise". The French foreign minister Jean-Noël Barrot announced that he would summon Charles Kushner, the American ambassador to France. Barrot said "We reject any use of this tragedy, which has plunged a French family into mourning, for political ends". Kushner did not appear to the summons, citing a prior engagement, and instead sent a deputy from the US embassy. This led to Barrot to moving to request that Kushner "no longer be allowed direct access" to government ministers.

== See also ==
- Assassination of José Calvo Sotelo
- Killing of Clément Méric
