= Alice Cordier =

French far-right activist

- Born: Alice Kerviel; 1998 (age 27–28)
- Occupation: Activist
- Years active: 2019–present
- Known for: Founder and president of the Collectif Némésis
- Movement: Identitarian movement

Alice Cordier (born 1998) is a French identitarian activist. Having received her political education at Action Française, Academia Christiana and the Institut de formation politique, she founded the Collectif Némésis in 2019, which she has chaired ever since. This female-led identitarian collective presents itself as feminist whilst attributing violence against women primarily to immigration. Cordier has become its main public face, appearing notably on media outlets belonging to the Bolloré group.

She advocates for complementarity between men and women. Several media outlets have reported on her links with neo-Nazi activists, which she disputes on certain points. In February 2026, Quentin Deranque, a radical far-right activist, died in Lyon following a brawl with anti-fascists. Cordier portrayed him as an activist who had come to protect the activists from Némésis, who had turned up to disrupt a conference by MEP Rima Hassan – a claim his parents dispute. According to Le Canard enchaîné, she became the leading media voice on this affair.

== Biography ==
=== Early life ===
Alice Kerviel was born in 1998 into a wealthy family with a strong Catholic faith. She is the second of three children. She is from Rennes. She studied in Paris in the health and social care sector, a choice she has linked to her faith. She has said she was subjected to intimidation, insults and assaults on the streets of Paris by foreign men, and said this experience is what triggered her later involvement in the Collectif Némésis.

She received her political training as a teenager in Action Française, while living in Orléans. She also frequented Academia Christiana and attended its summer conference in 2019. After moving to Paris in 2017, she took a course at the Institut de formation politique, which is popular among young identitarians. According to Le Canard enchaîné, she learned there to shape her messaging so that it could be spread more easily.

=== Leadership of Némésis ===
In 2019, she founded the Collectif Némésis, which she has chaired since its creation. The collective was only registered as an association in March 2021. Marianne describes a vertical organisation headed by a board in which Cordier is the leading figure. Némésis presents itself as the new spearhead of the female identitarian movement in France and takes over from the Belle & rebelle collective, which was active in the wake of La Manif pour tous and disappeared in 2017. Némésis describes itself as feminist and brings together young white women from urban, affluent backgrounds. Cordier promotes a strictly codified femininity for the collective, modelled on the archetype of the "young European girl". Némésis borrows tactics from feminist movements, including happenings in public spaces, poster campaigns inspired by street feminists, and rallies in memory of alleged "francocides". The collective thus repurposes the concept of femicide to refer to an anti-French hatred targeting white people, which it presents as systemic and deadly. According to Léane Alestra, Némésis follows a femonationalist logic. The collective also feeds the far right's Islamophobic rhetoric, built around the fantasy of a pure nation threatened by an alleged Islamic invasion.

She adopted the pseudonym Alice Cordier in November 2020 at the sixth Forum de la dissidence organised by Jean-Yves Le Gallou's foundation. Over the years, Cordier became the collective's main public face. The magazine L'Incorrect was one of the first media outlets to report on Némésis's actions, and in December 2020 it opened a blog dedicated to the collective on its website. Cordier has regularly been invited by outlets such as Radio Courtoisie, CNews, Europe 1 and the programme Touche pas à mon poste ! on C8, the last three belonging to the Bolloré group's media holdings. In 2021, her arrest by police during a Némésis happening on the Trocadéro Esplanade, filmed by Valeurs actuelles, Russia Today and Boulevard Voltaire, earned her the support of politicians such as Gilbert Collard. In 2022, she was the only spokesperson of the collective with more than 20,000 followers on Instagram and 12,000 on Twitter.

In 2024, Cordier revealed on X that a La France Insoumise (LFI) MP had filed a rape complaint against her partner, also an elected LFI official. The following day, Le Parisien reported that the MP was Ersilia Soudais and that her partner was a municipal councillor in Noisiel. Cordier then shared the X account of the accused man with her followers.

In 2026, following the killing of Quentin Deranque, a radical far-right activist who died of injuries sustained in a brawl with anti-fascists, Cordier expressed her emotion even before his death was announced and presented Deranque as having wanted to "protect" the Némésis activists who had come to disrupt a talk by MEP Rima Hassan. Deranque's parents disputed this account through their lawyer, who stated that he was neither a security guard nor a member of a stewarding team. She blamed the left and went as far as calling for the anti-fascist movement to be designated as terrorist, without mentioning the victim's national-revolutionary activism. According to Le Canard enchaîné, she quickly became the main media voice recounting the events. In the first days after the death, Cordier stated that the collective had called on acquaintances to provide security for its activists, although the collective's charter provides for the use of security professionals only; she later said she did not know Deranque's group. She then informed section leaders that upcoming actions were cancelled, except for the one planned for International Women's Day. Marianne reports that more than 200 activists, half of the membership, left the collective after the affair. Cordier, for her part, says that many women joined the association in the following months.

That same year, she took part in an anti-immigration rally in London organised by British far-right activist Tommy Robinson, where she went on stage with two other activists wearing niqabs, which they removed in front of the crowd.

== Public image ==
According to Alestra, Némésis activists, including Cordier, adopt a strategy that alternates between a docile posture staging traditional femininity, for instance during actions in long floral dresses with braided hair, and a deliberately virile attitude, for instance posing with semi-automatic weapons or training in boxing. In 2021, she appeared in a video filmed at a shooting range in which she said "Bye bye Sleeping Giants, here we come". In another post, she posed with an automatic weapon, wearing a garment bearing the image of an armed Joan of Arc.

In 2022, Mediapart noted that she regularly organised photo shoots of herself to supply her Instagram account with pictures along other far-right activists and partnerships with identitarian brands, which the outlet presented as a sign of her integration into the identitarian economic network.

== Political positions ==
Cordier acknowledges some of the observations made by feminist activists, notably the weight of the male gaze in shaping female identity. She also advocates combating obstetric violence and introducing electronic tags for perpetrators of domestic violence. She encourages her activists to devote their twenties to education and political training rather than to finding a partner, with a view to becoming wives and mothers prepared for that role. Alestra analyses this stance as serving both broadening the ranks of the identitarian movement and consolidating Cordier's authority over her activists, a position of authority Alestra considers unusual for a woman in that milieu. According to Alestra, Cordier thus turns Némésis into a kind of "school of femininity" that borrows codes from masculinist coaches and applies them to a female audience.

She blames violence against women primarily on immigration and claims that rape culture is more prevalent in certain cultures. On the collective's website, she writes of the need to defend white men, presented as the fathers and future fathers of French children, at a time when, according to her, the share of "ethnic French people" ("Français de souche") could become a minority by 2050. She justifies her opposition to immigration of men by her refusal to risk bringing in men from countries where women are allegedly relegated to second place and where Sharia is said to apply.

On birth control, she says she favours so-called natural methods and opposes large pharmaceutical companies. On abortion, she stated in 2021 that the number of abortions seemed excessive to her and spoke of trauma among the women concerned, before qualifying her remarks by saying she did not question the right to abortion but refused to treat it as trivial. In 2021, she expressed doubts about the effects of COVID-19 vaccination on young women's fertility. She advocates complementarity between men and women based on distinct gender roles, and endorses the ideas of Julien Rochedy, defending a "European virility" that she considers to be in decline. She explains Némésis's lack of a stance on feminist causes such as abortion or medically assisted reproduction by arguing that these issues do not concern all women, unlike street harassment, which she presents as an experience shared by all women.

She takes no position on same-sex marriage, which she presents as an issue specific to the LGBTQ community. In 2021, she denounced what she called "LGBT lobbies" and said she would consider "smashing her TV" if her future children watched a programme about transidentity.

== Relations within the far right ==
In 2019, she marched in a rally "against Islamisation" organised by Generation Identity, alongside another founder of Némésis and members of the Cocarde étudiante.

Asked in 2021 about possibly supporting Marine Le Pen in the 2022 French presidential election, she replied that "it's a possibility". In February 2022, she took part, alongside a National Rally municipal councillor from Marseille, in a conference on "patriotic women" organised by the Jeunes avec Marine movement.

According to Libération, since 2020 Cordier has been close to a racist neo-Nazi and hooligan activist, the right-hand man of Marc de Cacqueray-Valménier, leader of the Zouaves Paris. This neo-fascist group, dissolved in January 2022 for its violence, long provided security for Némésis. She also frequents a small circle of activists nicknamed "Pussyfafs", a pun combining the American girl group The Pussycat Dolls and "faf", a nickname radical far-right activists use for themselves, from "France aux Français" ("France for the French"). The circle includes the singer Epona and former parliamentary assistant Nina Smarandi. In 2023, Cordier was a witness and bridesmaid at Epona's wedding, where one of the guests made a hand sign associated with the white supremacist slogan "white power".

In December 2021, Cordier was slapped by far-right YouTuber Baptiste Marchais. The dispute stemmed from a product placement contract with an identitarian brand, obtained by Cordier, which Marchais believed should have gone to him. After the assault, Némésis's social media accounts initially defended Cordier, then deleted their statements a few hours later and stopped commenting on the matter. The identitarian movement as a whole responded with indifference, including accounts that usually supported Némésis's actions. Cordier filed a complaint, and an investigation was opened for intentional violence.

In 2026, an activist close to neo-Nazi circles published a 2022 photograph in which Cordier and a man form with their hands a sign shaped like an S or a lightning bolt, evoking the double Siegrune. The author of the post justified his own gesture as a parodic reference to drill music. Cordier said a stranger had presented it to her as a gesture popularised by a rap group. The sign is listed by the Anti-Defamation League as a gesture created by white supremacists in the 2000s to covertly signal adherence to Nazi ideology.

According to Marianne, she sent a messaging group a photograph of Gaëtan Pichonnat, a figure in neo-Nazi circles, taken at his own wedding in Orléans, in which he performs a Nazi salute, together with a message in which she asserted their closeness. Questioned by Marianne, she said she had no connection with Pichonnat and described the links attributed to the collective with far-right groups as "fantasies being circulated".

Marianne reported the testimony of a former activist according to whom Cordier was present at a party in May 2024 during which men allegedly showed videos of assaults on gay people and sang songs by neo-Nazi bands. Cordier denied this, calling it a false rumour spread by a former activist who she said has been harassing the collective for months.

== Legal proceedings ==
In 2023, she was arrested and taken into police custody along with two other Némésis activists for displaying a banner deemed racist at the Braderie de Lille, which referred to "Salafist readings" in high schools and linked them to insecurity in the city. The following day, the mayor of Lille, Martine Aubry, filed a complaint for incitement to racial hatred.

== Bibliography ==
- Alestra, Léane (2025). Les Vigilantes: Surveillées et surveillantes, ces femmes au cœur de l'extrême droite (in French). Paris: JC Lattès. ISBN 978-2-7096-7252-8.
- Bauvois, Gwenaëlle (2025). "Goddesses of Vengeance: How Far-Right Feminist Groups Co-opt Women's Rights to Fuel Polarization and Violence". In Bechtold, Eliza; Burbano-Herrera, Clara; Grossi, Zoë; Haeck, Yves (eds.). Echoes of Hate: Digital Communication, Populism and the Regulation of Hate Speech. Ghent: Human Rights in Context, Ghent University. pp. 113–129. ISBN 978-90-76566-00-9.
- Della Sudda, Magali (2022). Les Nouvelles Femmes de droite (in French). Paris: Hors d'atteinte. ISBN 978-2-38257-028-9.
