= Jeune Garde Antifasciste =

French outlawed anti-fascist group

- Successor: Éteignons la flamme
- Formation: 1 January 2018; 8 years ago
- Founder: Raphaël Arnault, Safak Sagdic, Jacques-Élie Favrot, Arnaud Monteiro, Alexandre Lélé
- Dissolved: 12 June 2025; 16 months ago (officially)
- Legal status: Officially disbanded by the French government, unofficially still active
- Purpose: Anti-fascism
- Location: France
- Region served: France
- Method: Political violence
- Official language: French
- Affiliations: La France Insoumise

The Jeune Garde Antifasciste (English: Antifascist Young Guard), commonly known as Jeune Garde, was an outlawed French far-left militant anti-fascist collective, which was founded in 2018 and dissolved by the Conseil d'État on 30 April 2026. The organisation focused on opposing far-right nationalist and neo-Nazi movements in France. It was dissolved by the French government in June 2025 following accusations of inciting violence.

== History ==
The Jeune Garde was founded in January 2018 in Lyon by Raphaël Arnault, Safak Sagdic, Jacques-Élie Favrot, Arnaud Monteiro, and Alexandre Lélé in reaction to the actions of Social Bastion. In 2019, a Strasbourg section was founded and in 2020, a section in Paris was founded. In 2021, local sections in Lille and Montpellier were founded. The group uses the Three Arrows as its logo, basing itself off the logo of the French Section of the Workers' International of the first half of the 20th century.

In September 2021, members of the far-right Zouaves Paris group assaulted Raphaël Arnault, the Jeune Garde's Lyon spokesperson, as he disembarked from a train arriving in Paris. In late-November 2021, Jeune Garde demonstrators clashed with members of the Collectif Némésis, an identitarian advocacy group that self-describes as feminist, after members of Némésis attempted to join a protest march against sexual violence in Paris organised by the Collectif NousToutes. In December 2021, National Assembly deputy Alexis Corbière and regional councillor Raquel Garrido filed a case with the police against two supporters of far-right politician Éric Zemmour after the Jeune Garde published a video online of the two Zemmour supporters at a firing range doing target practice while talking about several politicians that they would hunt, including Cobière and Garrido.

In February 2022, an anti-fascist conference in Strasbourg that the group attended was attacked by members of the neo-Nazi Strasbourg Offender hooligan group. In May 2022, Arnault resigned as spokesperson for the Lyon section to run in the 2022 French legislative election against the candidate of the New Ecological and Social People's Union. According to Europe 1, the group was involved in around ten clashes with the far-right in Lyon in 2023.

In June 2024, ahead of the 2024 French legislative election, it joined the New Popular Front alliance in an effort to contrast the rising French far-right. Arnault was named La France Insoumise's candidate as part of the Front for Vaucluse's 1st constituency. On 29 April 2025, interior minister Bruno Retailleau announced the opening of proceedings to dissolve the Jeune Garde along with other groups he accused of "inciting violent acts against individuals". Jeune Garde was dissolved by the French government on 12 June 2025, with the government citing the group's repeated provocations to violent acts. The decision was made alongside the dissolving of the far-right group Lyon Populaire.

== Involvement in the death of Quentin Deranque ==
In February 2026, men associated with the Jeune Garde were arrested in relation to the killing of Quentin Deranque. Initially reported as an attack on an isolated victim rather than a brawl between two armed groups, Deranque's death provoked national political reactions in the lead-up to the March 2026 French municipal elections. The French political class accused the far-left and the Jeune Grade of being responsible, while the public prosecutor office and the police sought to identify the perpetrators. Justice minister Gérald Darmanin and interior minister Laurent Nuñez both commented on the early progress of the investigation, claiming that the far-left was behind the attack and alleging links with the Jeune Garde. Citing videos of the event, several journalistic investigations gradually called into question the initial version of events by Némésis, particularly regarding who was responsible for the clashes between the two groups. Further investigations revealed that Némésis had repeatedly coordinated with far-right groups in Lyon to provoke clashes with left-wing activists.
