= Cécile Helle =

French politician (born 1969)

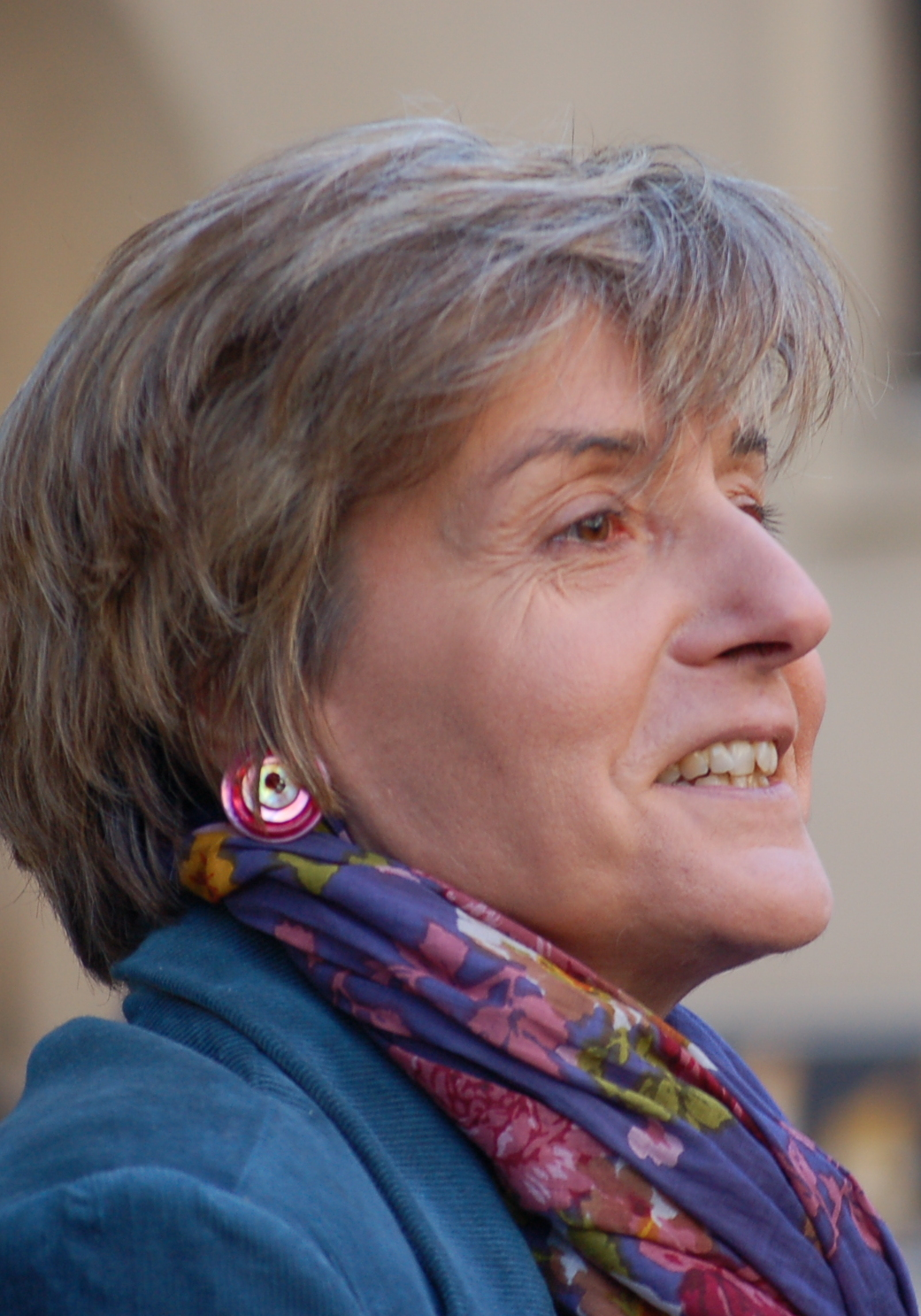
- Helle in 2020

Mayor of Avignon
- In office 5 April 2014 – 28 March 2026
- Preceded by: Marie-Josée Roig
- Succeeded by: Olivier Galzi

Member of the French National Assembly for Vaucluse's 1st constituency
- In office 5 July 1997 – 18 June 2002
- Preceded by: Élisabeth Guigou
- Succeeded by: Marie-Josée Roig

Personal details
- Born: 8 May 1969 (age 56)
- Party: Socialist Party

Cécile Helle (born 8 May 1969) is a French politician serving as mayor of Avignon since 2014. From 1997 to 2002, she was a member of the National Assembly.

== Biography ==
Cécile Helle was a lecturer in geography at the Avignon University and a member of the E.S.P.A.C.E. research laboratory. As the substitute for Élisabeth Guigou, she began her mandate as a deputy for the 11th legislature (1997–2002) for the 1st constituency of Vaucluse when Guigou was appointed to the Jospin Government. She lost her seat in 2002 to Marie-Josée Roig, with 41.64% of the vote.

In 2004, she became a regional councilor, and six years later, Vice-President of the Provence-Alpes-Côte d'Azur region following the re-election of Michel Vauzelle as head of the regional authority. She served as the 10th Vice-President, delegated to culture and cultural heritage, and was a member of both the Commission for Regional Planning and Development and the Permanent Commission.

On 21 November 2011, she announced her candidacy for the Socialist Party (PS) nomination to head the list for the 2014 municipal elections in Avignon. She was elected Mayor of Avignon in the second round on 30 March 2014, following a three-way race between the FN, UMP, and PS. Formally elected by the municipal council on 5 April 2014, she subsequently resigned from her position as a regional councilor. She was defeated in the race for the presidency of Grand Avignon by Jean-Marc Roubaud, and subsequently became the 1st Vice-President in charge of finance and economic development.

In November 2019, the outgoing Socialist mayor declared herself a candidate for a second term under the label "Avignon, Notre Cœur, Notre Force" (Avignon, Our Heart, Our Strength). After placing first in both rounds of the 2020 French municipal elections, she was re-elected mayor by the municipal council of Avignon on 4 July 2020.

In September 2024, she declined an offer to join the Barnier government as Minister of Housing and Urban Renewal.

Cécile Helle serves as the 2nd Vice-President of the association "Centre-Ville en Mouvement" (City Center in Motion). She actively participates in the association's initiatives, notably the National City Center Conferences, such as the 18th conference held in Avignon.
