= Le Pontet, Vaucluse =

Le Pontet Lo Pontet (Occitan)
- Commune
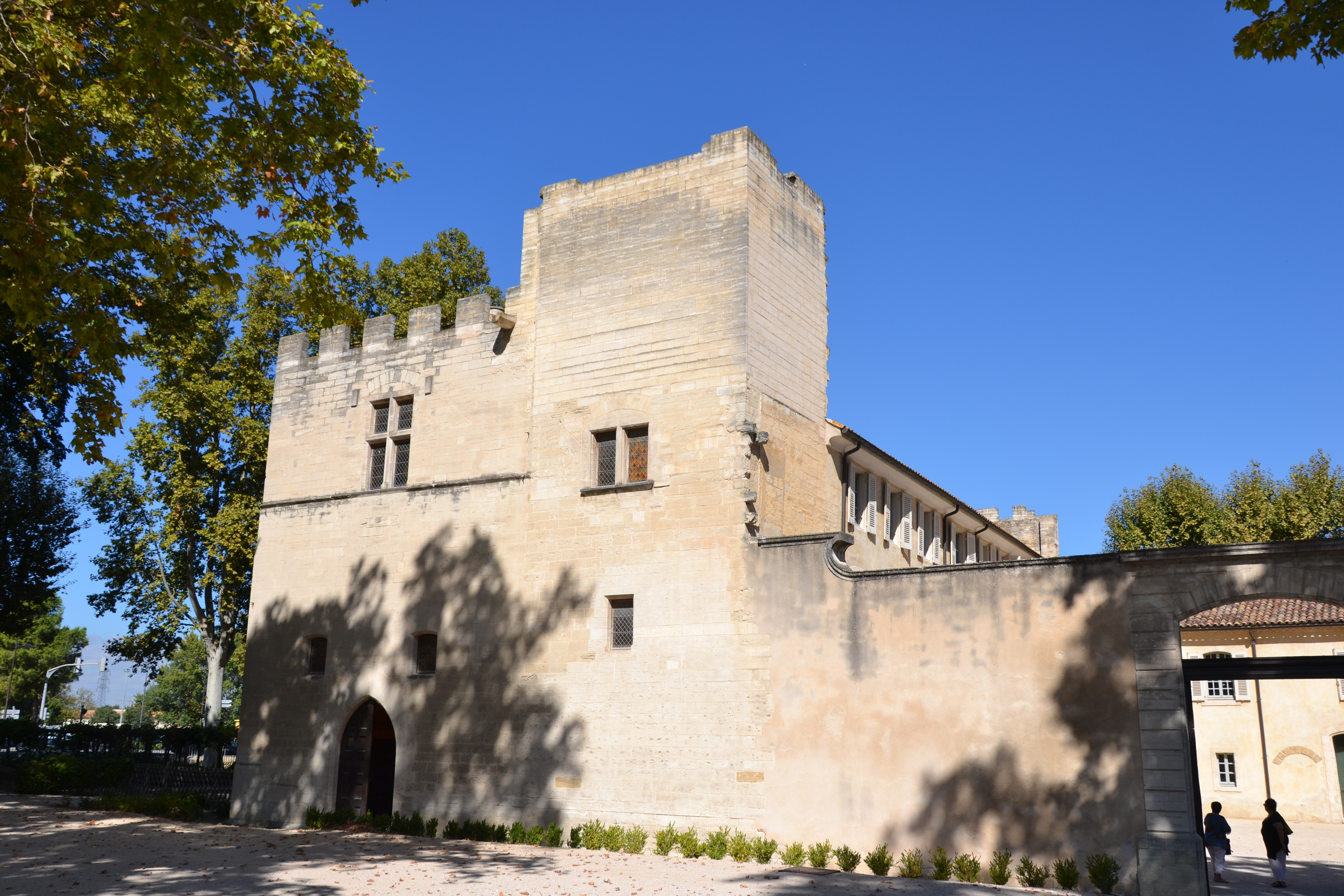
- Château de Fargues

- Coat of arms
- Location of Le Pontet
- Location within France Location within Provence-Alpes-Côte d'Azur
- Coordinates: 43°57′54″N 4°51′38″E
- Country: France
- Region: Provence-Alpes-Côte d'Azur
- Department: Vaucluse
- Arrondissement: Avignon
- Canton: Le Pontet
- Intercommunality: CA Grand Avignon

Government
  - Mayor (2023–2026): Joris Hébrard (RN)
- Area^{1}: 10.77 km^{2} (4.16 sq mi)
- Highest elevation: 30 m (98 ft)
- Lowest elevation: 16 m (52 ft)
- Population (2023): 18,386
  - Density: 1,707/km^{2} (4,421/sq mi)
- Time zone: UTC+01:00 (CET)
  - Summer (DST): UTC+02:00 (CEST)
- INSEE/Postal code: 84092 /84130
- ^{1} French Land Register data, which excludes lakes, ponds, glaciers > 1 km^{2} (0.386 sq mi or 247 acres) and river estuaries.

Le Pontet (French pronunciation: [lə pɔ̃tɛ]; Provençal Occitan: Lo Pontet) is a commune in the Vaucluse department in the Provence-Alpes-Côte d'Azur region in Southeastern France.

Le Pontet is a suburb of the city of Avignon lying adjacent to its northeastern side and is one of the constituent municipalities in the Vaucluse and the Gard of the urban agglomeration of Grand Avignon.

== Demographics ==
Historical population
Year	Pop.	±% p.a.
1968	8,178	—
1975	10,465	+3.59%
1982	12,920	+3.06%
1990	15,688	+2.46%
1999	15,594	−0.07%
2007	17,531	+1.47%
2012	17,002	−0.61%
2017	17,530	+0.61%
2023	18,386	+0.80%
Source: INSEE

Its inhabitants are called Pontétiens (masculine) and Pontétiennes (feminine) in French.

== Sport ==
The city has many sports facilities: two gymnasiums, a municipal swimming pool, athletic field, a rugby league field, three main football pitches, basketball courts, a tennis club, etc.

Le Pontet is the home of Championnat de France Amateurs club, US Le Pontet.

== Culture ==
Le Pontet is also a town of culture. For decades, the Château de Fargues and the Roberty's Domain have been the scene of several cultural events. The Château de Fargues is also the city's school of music and dance. Le Pontet also has an auditorium, a pétanque area and theaters.

== Economy ==
Le Pontet has one of the largest business and retail parks in Europe. Named Avignon Nord, the area includes hundreds of shops, two shopping centers, a cinema, a bowling alley, and many companies.

== See also ==
- Communes of the Vaucluse department
