= Olivier Galzi =

French journalist (born 1971)

Mayor of Avignon
- Incumbent
- Assumed office March 28, 2026
- Preceded by: Cécile Helle

Personal details
- Born: 26 October 1971 (age 54) Tunis, Tunisia
- Occupation: Television journalist

Olivier Galzi (born 26 October 1971) is a French politician serving as mayor of Avignon since 2026 and a former journalist.

== Journalistic career ==
Galzi worked for the French TV network France 2, a division of France Télévisions. On France 2, he presented news bulletins within Télématin, France 2's morning show presented weekdays at 7:00 and 8:00 CET in Metropolitan France. Galzi was also the regular substitute for David Pujadas on the station's evening news bulletin 20 heures. He sometimes presented the newscasts in Canada on TV5 every 1/2 hour (4 times over 2 hours, starting shortly before the hour and 1/2 past the hour) from 6:00 to 8:00 am North American Eastern Time.

In August 2010 Galzi left France Télévisions to run the breakfast show La Matinale de L'Info from 6 am to 9 am each weekday on i-Télé, alongside the newsreader Amandine Bégot.

On 2011, Denis Girolami joined i-Télé from RTL and replaced Galzi, so he took charge on a new show: L'Édition du Soir every weekend from 6 pm to midnight.

From 10/2011 to 9/2012, Galzi presented a magazine about presidential election, called CQFD – Ce qu'il fallait décrypter, every Saturday from 10:15 am to 11 am.

On 9/2012, he started presenting La Grande Édition from 10 pm to midnight each weekday with Maya Lauqué.

From 2016 to 7/2017, he anchors Galzi Jusqu'à Minuit – Le Grand Décryptage, which running Monday–Thursday from 9:00 pm to midnight.

On 7/2017, he left CNews.

== Political career ==
Galzi launched his campaign for mayor of Avignon in 2025, with the support of Horizons and Union of Democrats and Independents.
