= Bastien Lachaud =

French politician (born 1980)

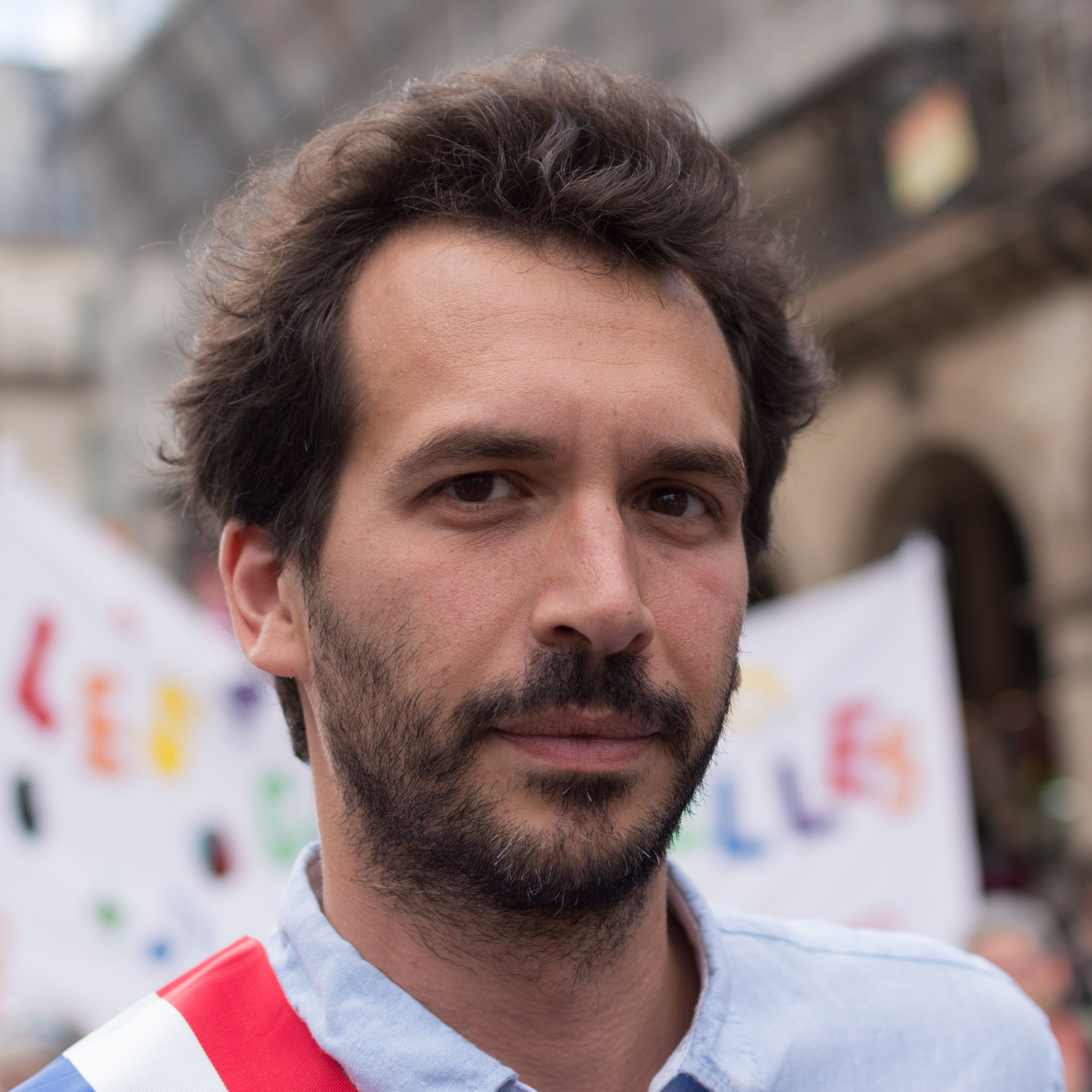
- Lachaud in 2017

Member of the National Assembly for Seine-Saint-Denis's 6th constituency
- Incumbent
- Assumed office 21 June 2017
- Preceded by: Élisabeth Guigou

Personal details
- Born: 5 August 1980 (age 46) Vitry-sur-Seine, France
- Party: La France Insoumise
- Education: Paris 1 Panthéon-Sorbonne University
- Profession: Teacher

Bastien Lachaud (born 5 August 1980) is a French politician representing La France insoumise (Rebellious France). He was elected to the French National Assembly on 18 June 2017, representing the department of Seine-Saint-Denis.

Formerly a History teacher, Lachaud was a member of the Socialist Party until 2008, when he left the party to join the newly formed "Parti de Gauche" (Left Party), where he hold the position of Secretary National for the party. Lachaud also lead the national legislative campaign for FI.

He was re-elected in the 2022 election.

== Bibliography ==
In 2019 Bastien Lachaud published an essay titled "Faut-il faire la guerre à la Russie"

== See also ==
- 2017 French legislative election
- 2022 French legislative election
- 2024 French legislative election
