= Jean-François Cesarini =

French politician (1970–2020)

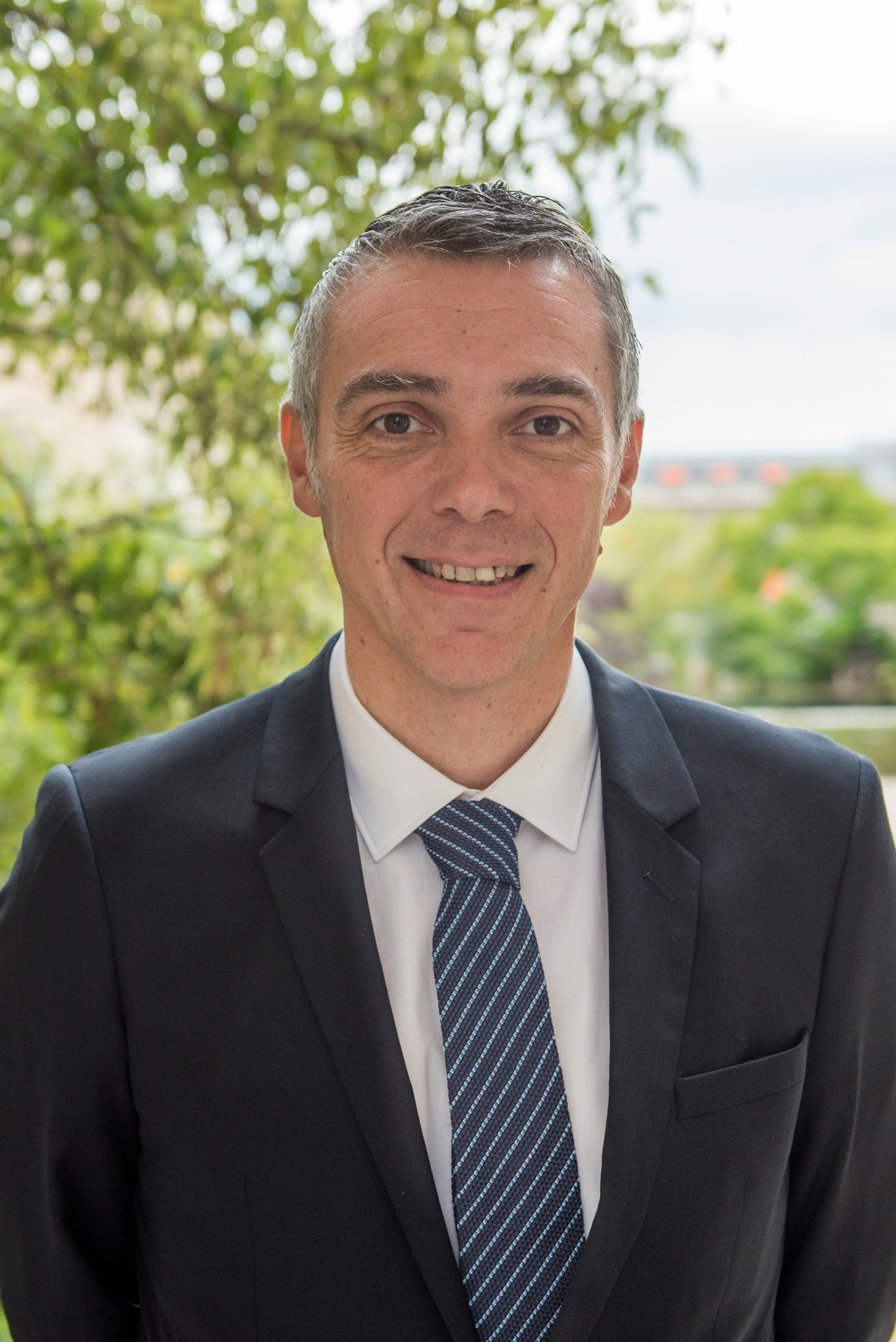
- Jean-François Cesarini in 2017

Member of the National Assembly for Vaucluse's 1st constituency
- In office 21 June 2017 – 29 March 2020
- Preceded by: Michèle Fournier-Armand
- Succeeded by: Souad Zitouni

Personal details
- Born: 30 September 1970 Avignon, France
- Died: 29 March 2020 (aged 49) Marseille, France
- Cause of death: Cancer
- Party: La République En Marche! (2017–2020)
- Other political affiliations: Socialist Party (until 2017)
- Education: Paul Valéry University Montpellier 3

Jean-François Cesarini (30 September 1970 – 29 March 2020) was a French politician who represented the 1st constituency of the Vaucluse department in the National Assembly from 2017 until his death in 2020. He was a member of La République En Marche! (LREM).

== Political career ==
Having previously been an active member of the Socialist Party, Cesarini joined LREM in 2017.

In parliament, Cesarini served on the Committee on Sustainable Development and Spatial Planning. In addition to his committee assignments, he was a member of the study group on Taiwan and of the French delegation to the Inter-Parliamentary Union (IPU).

== Political positions ==
In early 2019, together with around twenty other LREM members, Cesarini proposed to re-establish a solidarity tax on wealth, which had been abolished the previous year.

In July 2019, Cesarini voted in favor of the French ratification of the European Union’s Comprehensive Economic and Trade Agreement (CETA) with Canada.

In September 2019, together with other members of the left wing of the LREM group, Cesarini called for migrants to be distributed in rural areas with labour shortages. In November 2019, he co-signed a position paper with ten other LREM members to oppose the government's planned measures on the provision of health services to immigrants.

== See also ==
- 2017 French legislative election
