= Raphaël Arnault =

French activist and politician (born 1995)

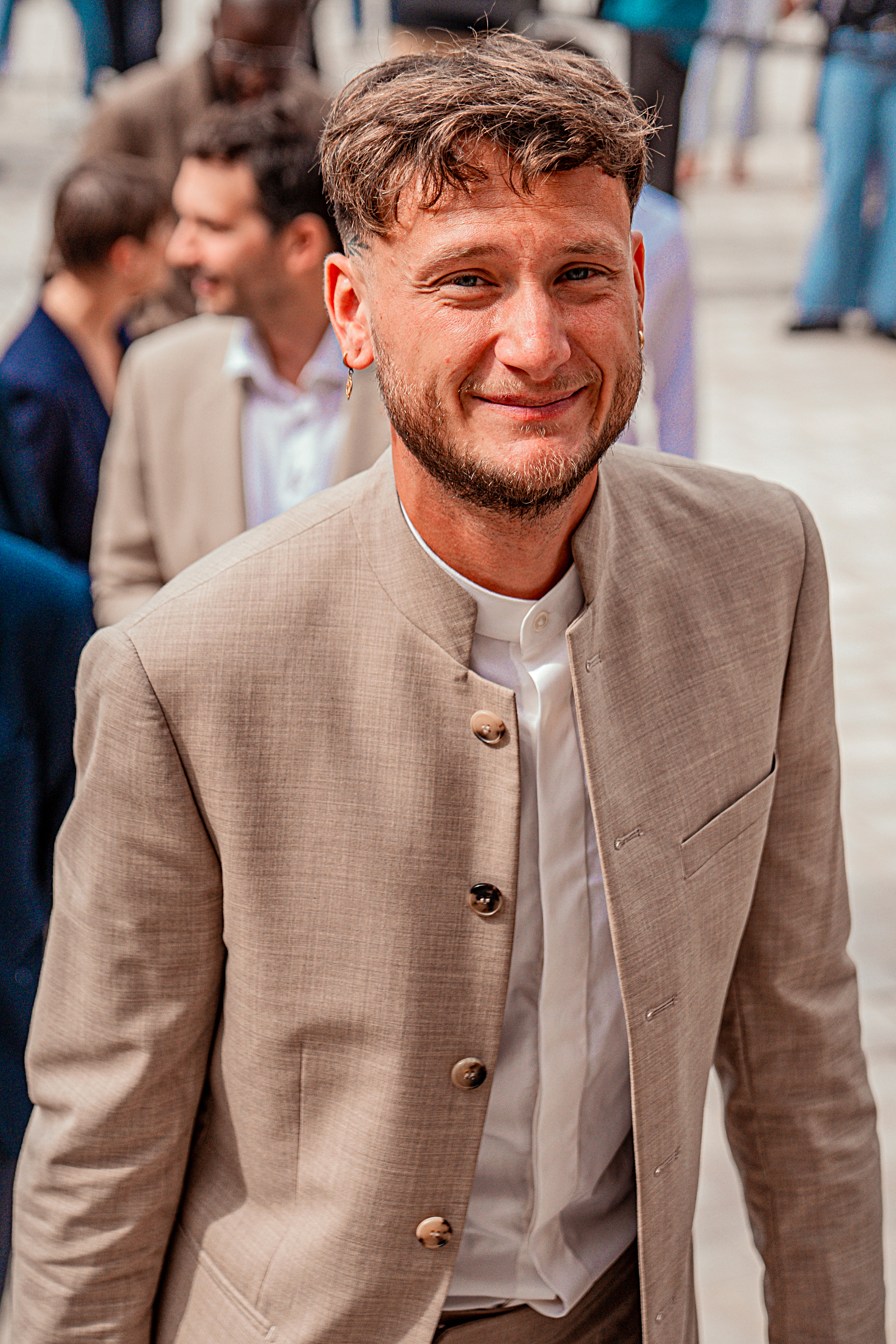
- Arnault in 2024

Member of the National Assembly for Vaucluse's 1st constituency
- Incumbent
- Assumed office 8 July 2024
- Preceded by: Catherine Jaouen

Personal details
- Born: 8 January 1995 (age 31) Lyon, France
- Party: La France Insoumise (2024–present)
- Other political affiliations: New Anticapitalist Party (until 2024)

Raphaël Archenault (French pronunciation: [ʁafaɛl aʁʃəno]; born 8 January 1995), known as Raphaël Arnault ([aʁno]), is a French far-left activist and politician who has represented Vaucluse's 1st constituency in the National Assembly since 2024. A member of La France Insoumise (LFI), he co-founded the Jeune Garde Antifasciste collective in 2018 and was one of its spokespersons. The collective grew close to LFI before it was outlawed for its violence by the government in 2025. In 2022, Arnault was found guilty of violent behaviour following an assault in 2021.

== Early life and activism ==
A native of Lyon, Arnault became politically active during the 2016 protests against the El Khomri law. He was a member of the New Anticapitalist Party and ran under its label in Rhône's 2nd constituency in 2022, placing fourth in the first round. In 2018, he co-founded the anti-fascist collective Jeune Garde Antifasciste in Lyon and became one of its spokespersons until the group's dissolution on 12 June 2025.

In February 2022 Arnault was convicted in first instance by a Lyon court of voluntary grouped violence ("violences volontaires en réunion") for an assault that occurred in April 2021 in Lyon; he was handed a four-month suspended prison sentence. He initially appealed the judgment but later withdrew his appeal in 2025.

In May 2024 Arnault was questioned by police regarding an October 2023 communiqué that initially referred to Hamas as a "resistance movement" and was later withdrawn the same day.

== Political career ==
In the 2024 French legislative election, Arnault was elected to the National Assembly in Vaucluse's 1st constituency, defeating incumbent Catherine Jaouen of the National Rally with 54.9% of the second-round vote. In Parliament, he sits with the LFI–NFP (La France Insoumise–New Popular Front) group and has served on the Committee on Cultural Affairs and Education.

=== "Fiche S" reporting ===
During the 2024 legislative campaign multiple outlets described Arnault as listed under a "Fiche S" by the government, meaning he has been flagged as a threat for national security. According to Europe 1, he was subject to three such listings; Arnault criticised proposals to render "Fiché S" individuals ineligible for office.

=== Killing of Quentin Deranque ===
On 16 February 2026, Jacques-Élie Favrot, a parliamentary assistant to Arnault, had his access to the National Assembly suspended by President of the National Assembly Yaël Braun-Pivet after being suspected of involvement in the killing of Quentin Deranque, an activist with the far-right Collectif Némésis in Lyon two days prior. On 17 February, Favrot was arrested by police in connection to the death, alongside another staffer for Arnault, Robin Chalendard. Media reported that both are also "Fiché S" by the government. On 1 April 2026, Arnault returned to the National Assembly for the first time since the incident. National Assembly President Yaël Braun-Pivet stated that, while legally permitted, "morally it is difficult for him to represent the Nation given this type of behaviour" and left the decision to Arnault's conscience.

In an April 2026 interview with Blast, Arnault broke his media silence, explaining it as a desire "to look at the bigger picture at the moment". He expressed emotion over the events but placed "immense responsibility" on the French state and police, citing "failures at all levels" and a clear "laissez-faire" attitude, while noting that "a 23-year-old also died". Arnault defended his parliamentary collaborator Favrot as "not someone who wishes the death of another" and insisted the violence had nothing to do with the now-dissolved Jeune Garde, describing the circulated images as "antinomical" to the group's proposals and confirming that all activities had ceased after the dissolution decree.
