= Joris Hébrard =

French politician (born 1982)

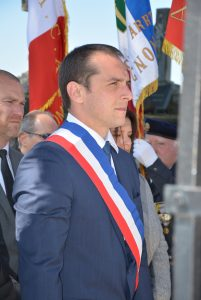

Member of the National Assembly for Vaucluse's 1st constituency
- In office 22 June 2022 – 3 June 2023
- Preceded by: Souad Zitouni
- Succeeded by: Catherine Jaouen

Mayor of Le Pontet
- Incumbent
- Assumed office 4 May 2023
- Preceded by: Patrick Suisse
- In office 6 June 2015 – 5 September 2022
- Preceded by: Jean-Louis Cros (Note: As president of the special delegation appointed by the prefect of Vaucluse.)
- Succeeded by: Patrick Suisse
- In office 5 April 2014 – 2 March 2015
- Preceded by: Béatrice Lecoq
- Succeeded by: Jean-Louis Cros

Personal details
- Born: 31 May 1982 (age 43) Avignon, France
- Party: National Rally
- Occupation: Physiotherapist; Politician

Joris Hébrard (born 31 May 1982) is a French politician who represented the 1st constituency of the Vaucluse department in the National Assembly from 2022 to 2023. A member of the National Rally (RN, formerly National Front, FN), he has served as Mayor of Le Pontet since 2023, previously holding the office from 2014 to 2022, with a brief interruption in 2015.

== Biography ==
A physiotherapist by occupation, Hébrard continued to practice his profession following his election to the mayorship of Le Pontet on 5 April 2014, after the National Front list he led in the municipal election received 42.6% of the vote in the second round, 7 votes ahead of the Union for a Popular Movement list.

On 25 February 2015, the Conseil d'État ruled the 2014 municipal election was held irregularly and new election had to be called. The prefect of Vaucluse installed a special delegation in Le Pontet until a new election was held, which was won on 31 May 2015 in the first round by the list led by Hébrard with 59.4% of the vote.

In the 2015 departmental election, Joris Hébrard, in pairs with Danielle Brun, was elected to the Departmental Council of Vaucluse in the canton of Le Pontet with 53.7% of the vote in the first round. He took office on 2 April 2015. He was reelected in 2021 before he resigned effective 5 September 2022.

At the 2022 legislative election, he was the National Rally (former National Front) candidate in the 1st constituency of Vaucluse, centred on the prefecture Avignon. He was elected in the second round with 51.1% of the vote. He resigned from the mayorship of Le Pontet after he took office in the National Assembly.

On 4 April 2023, it was announced that Hébrard would resign his parliamentary seat to return as Mayor of Le Pontet less than a year after his election. He had been criticised within his party for having taken part in the opening ceremony of a mosque in his constituency. He was succeeded by his substitute Catherine Jaouen in the National Assembly.
