= Élisabeth Guigou =

French politician

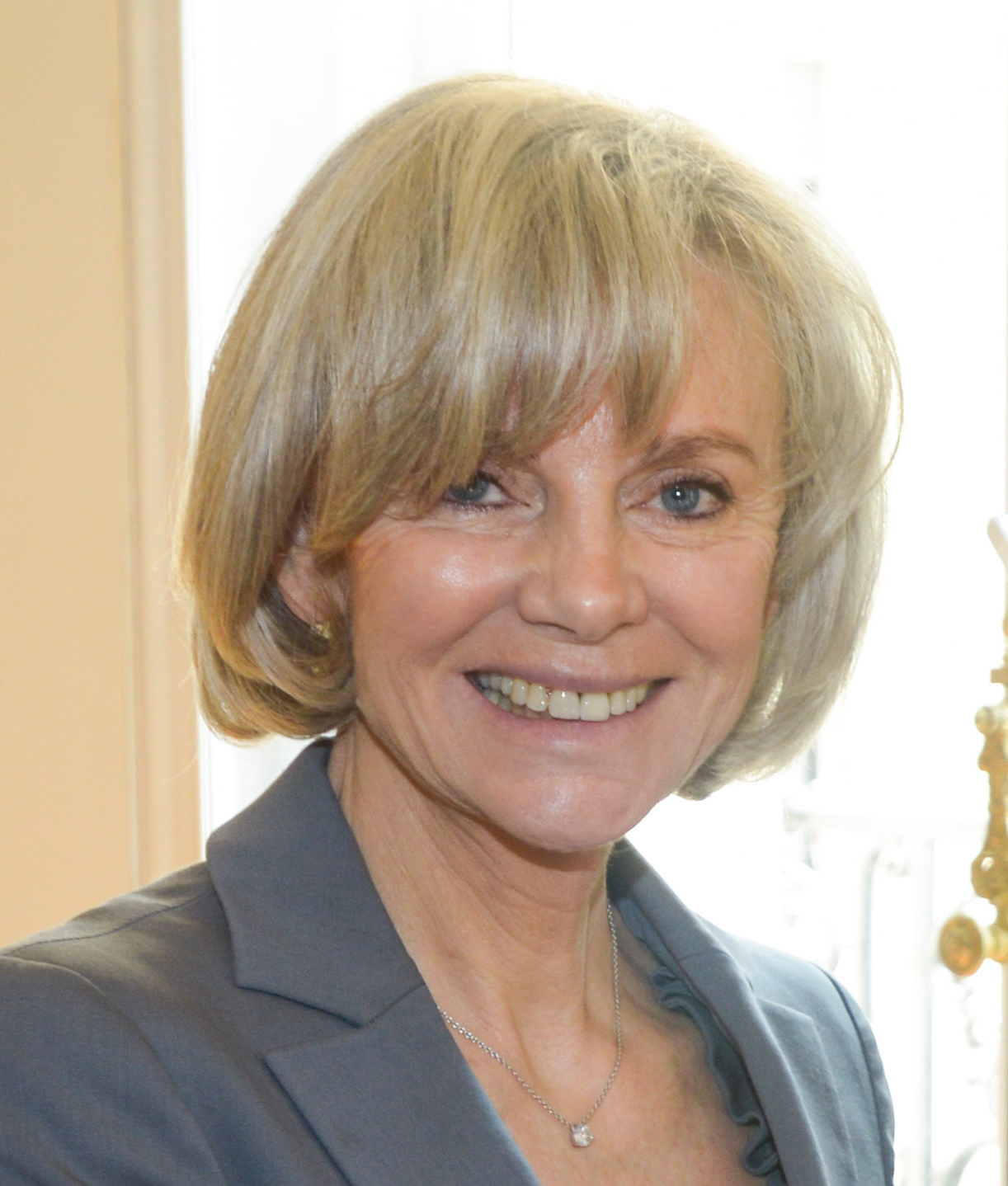

President of the Foreign Affairs Committee of the National Assembly
- In office 28 June 2012 – 20 June 2017
- Preceded by: Axel Poniatowski
- Succeeded by: Marielle de Sarnez

Vice-President of the National Assembly
- In office 5 October 2010 – 2 October 2011
- President: Bernard Accoyer

Minister of Employment and Solidarity
- In office 18 October 2000 – 6 May 2002
- President: Jacques Chirac
- Prime Minister: Lionel Jospin
- Preceded by: Martine Aubry
- Succeeded by: François Fillon

Minister of Justice
- In office 4 June 1997 – 18 October 2000
- President: Jacques Chirac
- Prime Minister: Lionel Jospin
- Preceded by: Jacques Toubon
- Succeeded by: Marylise Lebranchu

Member of the European Parliament
- In office 19 July 1994 – 5 July 1995
- Parliamentary group: ESP
- Constituency: France

Delegated Minister for European Affairs
- In office 3 October 1990 – 29 March 1993
- President: François Mitterrand
- Prime Minister: Michel Rocard; Édith Cresson; Pierre Bérégovoy
- Preceded by: Édith Cresson
- Succeeded by: Alain Lamassoure

Member of the National Assembly
- In office 20 June 2012 – 20 June 2017
- Preceded by: Claude Bartolone
- Succeeded by: Bastien Lachaud
- Parliamentary group: SRC (2012-2016); SER (2016-2017)
- Constituency: Seine-Saint-Denis' 6th Constituency
- In office 19 June 2002 – 19 June 2012
- Preceded by: Véronique Neiertz
- Succeeded by: Claude Bartolone
- Parliamentary group: SOC (2002-2007); SRC (2007-2012)
- Constituency: Seine-Saint-Denis' 9th Constituency
- In office 12 June 1997 – 4 July 1997
- Preceded by: Marie-Josée Roig
- Succeeded by: Cécile Helle
- Parliamentary group: SOC
- Constituency: Vaucluse' 1st Constituency

Personal details
- Born: Élisabeth Vallier; 6 August 1946 (age 80) Marrakesh, French Morocco
- Party: Socialist Party
- Spouse: Jean-Louis Guigou
- Education: Institute of Political Studies, Aix; National School of Administration, Strasbourg

Élisabeth Guigou (French: [elizabɛt ɡiɡu]; born Élisabeth Vallier; 6 August 1946) is a French politician of the Socialist Party who served as a member of the National Assembly from 2002 until 2017, representing Seine-Saint-Denis' 9th constituency.

== Early life and career ==
Guigou was born in Marrakesh, Morocco. After attending Sciences Po Aix and ENA, France's elite graduate school of public affairs, she worked in Jacques Delors' staff in 1982 before being hired by Hubert Védrine in François Mitterrand's government. She was appointed Secretary-General of the Interministerial Committee on European Economical Matters in 1986 during the period of cohabitation.

=== Studies ===
- Bachelor of English Language, Paul Valéry University, Montpellier III
- Master of American Literature, Paul Valéry University, Montpellier III
- Master of Political Science, Institut d'études politiques d'Aix-en-Provence
- 2 years university degree in Economy (DEUG), Aix-Marseille University
- Alumna of the École nationale d'administration (ENA), Promotion Simone Weil (1974).

== Political career ==
Guigou first got a taste of front-line politics when she was appointed Minister of European Affairs (1990–1993), during the campaign on the Maastricht Treaty.

=== Member of the European Parliament, 1994–1997 ===
Guigou was elected to the European Parliament in the 1994 elections. Throughout her time in parliament, she served as vice-chairwoman of the Committee on Institutional Affairs. During 1994–1995 she was member of the Tindemans group. Together with Elmar Brok, she represented the European Parliament in the negotiations that produced the Amsterdam Treaty.

=== Member of the Jospin government, 1997–2002 ===
In 1997, Guigou was elected to the National Assembly in the Vaucluse département and entered incoming Prime Minister Lionel Jospin's cabinet, as Minister of Justice (1997–2000) and then as Minister of Employment (2000–2002).

During her time in office, Guigou co-sponsored several bills that became law. She co-sponsored a 1998 law which abrogated the requirement of "manifestation of will" for children born in France of foreign parents to gain citizenship. Also in the late 1990s, she took action to grant investigating magistrates more independence; at the same time, she gave the Justice Ministry the ability to intervene.

Guigou also co-sponsored a 2000 law which articulated the French policy on presumption of innocence in media by prohibiting magazines and newspapers from publishing photographs of accused individuals wearing handcuffs or other scenes which may "jeopardise a victim's dignity". It forbids the publication of photographs of survivors of violent crimes, including terrorist attacks, without their permission. The law, which was unanimously supported by the Senate and later became known as the Guigou law, was openly opposed by leading publications such as Paris Match, which ignores the law.

In 2001, in response to announcements of layoffs ahead of the 2002 presidential elections, Guigou and Jospin developed a proposal that required large employers planning layoffs to double severance-pay packages and provide at least six months' job retraining to laid-off workers.

=== Member of the National Assembly, 2002–2017 ===
Guigou failed to be elected Mayor of Avignon and, facing possible defeat against Marie-Josée Roig in her district, was nominated as a candidate for the National Assembly in 2002 in the heavily left-wing département of Seine-Saint-Denis. She was re-elected in 2007.

Guigou campaigned for the Yes side in the referendum on the 2005 Treaty establishing a Constitution for Europe.

From 2010 until 2011, Guigou served as vice-president of the National Assembly. In 2011, she was a supporter of Socialist Party leader Martine Aubry's presidential bid. However, she later helped Aubry's competitor François Hollande to prepare to re-negotiate European fiscal rules.

From 2012 until 2017, Guigou served as chairwoman of the Committee on Foreign Affairs since 2012. She was also a member of the Committee on European Affairs and the Working Group on the Prevention of Conflicts of Interest. In addition to her committee assignments, she served as vice-chairwoman of the French-Moroccan Parliamentary Friendship Group.

Ahead of the Socialist Party's 2012 convention in Toulouse, Guigou publicly endorsed Harlem Désir as candidate to succeed Martine Aubry at the party's leadership.

In 2013, Guigou represented France for the funeral of Margaret Thatcher.

Shortly after the referendum on the status of Crimea held on 16 March 2014, Guigou and her counterparts of the Weimar Triangle parliaments – Norbert Röttgen of Germany and Grzegorz Schetyna of Poland – visited Kyiv to express their countries' firm support of the territorial integrity and the European integration of Ukraine. This was the first time that parliamentarians of the Weimar Triangle had ever made a joint trip to a third country.

Following the 2014 European elections, Guigou confirmed her interest in succeeding Michel Barnier as France's member of the European Commission, thereby challenging Pierre Moscovici.

From 2015, Guigou served as a member of the European Commission's High-level Group of Personalities on Defence Research chaired by Elżbieta Bieńkowska.

== Later career ==
In December 2020, Guigou was named by Secretary of State for Child protection Adrien Taquet to lead a government-mandated committee on sexual violence against children. Amid revelations about sexual assault involving her friend Olivier Duhamel, Guigou resigned from that role in January 2021.

== Overview ==
Governmental function

Minister of European Affairs : 1990–1993.

Keeper of the seals, Minister of Justice : 1997–2000.

Minister of Employment and Solidarity : 2000–2002.

Electoral mandates

European Parliament

Member of the European Parliament : 1994–1997 (Became minister in 1997, and elected in parliamentary elections).

French Parliament

Member of the National Assembly of France for Vaucluse : June 1997- July 1997 (Appointed Minister of Justice in July 1997).

Member of the National Assembly of France for Seine-Saint-Denis : Elected in 2002, reelected in 2007 and 2012.

Regional Council

Regional councillor of Provence-Alpes-Côte d'Azur : Elected in 1992, reelected in 1998, resigned in 2001.

Municipal Council

Deputy-mayor of Noisy-le-Sec : 2008–2010.

== Other activities ==
- Anna Lindh Euro-Mediterranean Foundation for the Dialogue Between Cultures, President (since 2014)
- European Council on Foreign Relations (ECFR), Member of the Council
- Femmes d'Europe (Women of Europe), Founder
- Europartenaires, founding chairwoman and co-president (with Jean-Noël Jeanneney)
- Friends of Europe, Member of the Board of Trustees
- Institut de Prospective Economique du Monde Méditerranéen (IPEMED), Member of the Political Sponsorship Committee
- Institut du Bosphore, Member of the Scientific Committee
- Institut français des relations internationales (Ifri), Member of the Board of Directors
- Jacques Delors Institute, Member of the Board of Directors
- Paris School of International Affairs (PSIA), Member of the Strategic Committee
- Trilateral Commission, Member of the European Group

== Political positions ==
In December 2014, Guigou raised international media attention by sponsoring a resolution to ask the French government to recognise Palestine.

In May 2016, Guigou joined 16 French female politicians – including Christine Lagarde and Fleur Pellerin – in calling for an end to "immunity" for sexist male politicians in an open letter published in the Journal de Dimanche newspaper. The letter came after Denis Baupin, deputy speaker of the National Assembly, resigned over sexual harassment claims.

== Personal life ==
Guigou is married to Jean-Louis Guigou, a professor of economics, former technical adviser to Michel Rocard and civil servant. They have one child.

Political offices
Preceded by Édith Cresson	Minister for European Affairs; 1990–1993	Succeeded by Alain Lamassoure
Preceded by Jacques Toubon	Minister of Justice; 1997–2000	Succeeded by Marylise Lebranchu
Preceded by Martine Aubry	Minister of Social Affairs; 2000–2002	Succeeded by François Fillon
