= Vaucluse's 1st constituency =

Constituency of the National Assembly of France

1st constituency of Vaucluse
- inline Constituency of the National Assembly of France

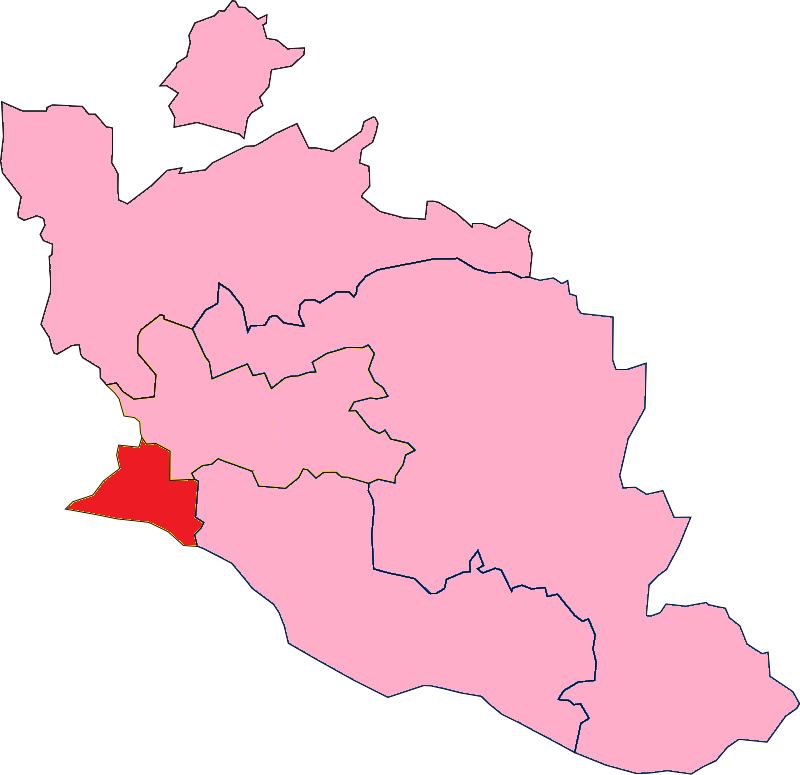
- Vaucluse's 1st Constituency shown within the Vaucluse
- Deputy: Raphaël Arnault; La France Insoumise
- Department: Vaucluse
- Cantons: Avignon Est, Avignon Nord, Avignon Ouest, Avignon Sud
- Registered voters: 72,991

The 1st constituency of the Vaucluse (French: Première circonscription de Vaucluse) is a French legislative constituency in the Vaucluse département. Like the other 576 French constituencies, it elects one MP using the two-round system, with a run-off if no candidate receives over 50% of the vote in the first round.

== Description ==
The 1st constituency of the Vaucluse covers the city of Avignon.

Between 1988 and 2012, the seat has fluctuated between left and right, before first turning to the centre in 2017, before being won by the far-right in 2022. Only Marie-Josée Roig has succeeded in retaining the seat since 1988.

== Assembly Members ==
Election	Member	Party
1988	Guy Ravier	PS
1993	Marie-Josée Roig	RPR
1997	Élisabeth Guigou	PS
2002	Marie-Josée Roig	UMP
2007	Marie-Josée Roig	UMP
2012	Michèle Fournier-Armand	PS
2017	Jean-François Cesarini	LREM
2020	Souad Zitouni (Note: substitute for Jean-François Cesarini, succeeded him on his death.)	LREM
2022	Joris Hébrard	RN
2023	Catherine Jaouen	RN
2024	Raphaël Arnault	LFI

== Election results ==
=== 2024 ===
Legislative Election 2024: Vaucluse's 1st constituency
Party	Candidate	Votes	%	±%
LR	Johan Courtois	1,459	3.24	−1.21
RN	Catherine Jaouen	15,598	34.62	+4.65
LFI	Philippe Pascal*	8,229	18.27	n/a
REG	Christine Chatenay	391	0.87	n/a
LO	Eddine Ghouali	361	0.80	n/a
REC	Philippe Toutain	594	1.32	−3.35
RE (Ensemble)	Malika Di Fraja	7,264	16.12	=6.73
LFI (NFP)	Raphaël Arnault	11,155	24.76	−5.79
Turnout		45,051	97.62	+55.23
Registered electors		74,020		
2nd round result
LFI	Raphaël Arnault	22,883	54.98	+6.14
RN	Catherine Jaouen	18,739	45.02	−6.14
Turnout		41,622	90.19	+46.76
Registered electors		74,035		
LFI gain from RN				

=== 2022 ===
Legislative Election 2022: Vaucluse's 1st constituency
Party	Candidate	Votes	%	±%
LFI (NUPÉS)	Farid Faryssy	9,338	30.55	+2.48
RN	Joris Hébrard	9,160	29.97	+6.96
LREM (Ensemble)	Souad Zitouni	6,985	22.85	−7.24
REC	Ophélie Nau	1,428	4.67	
LR (UDC)	André Castelli	1,359	4.45	−5.97
Others	N/A	2,297		
Turnout		31,269	42.39	−0.84
2nd round result
RN	Joris Hébrard	14,735	51.16	+9.26
LFI (NUPÉS)	Farid Faryssy	14,065	48.84	
Turnout		32,048	43.43	+3.48
RN gain from LREM				

=== 2017 ===
Legislative Election 2017: Vaucluse's 1st constituency
Party	Candidate	Votes	%	±%
LREM	Jean-François Cesarini	9,495	30.09	
FN	Anne-Sophie Rigault	7,261	23.01	
LFI	Amandine Laugier	4,090	12.96	
LR	Stéphanie Parry	3,288	10.42	
PCF	André Castelli	2,408	7.63	
PS	Christine Legrange	1,354	4.29	
EELV	Jean Pierre Cervantes	1,007	3.19	
Others	N/A	2,652		
Turnout		31,555	43.23	
2nd round result
LREM	Jean-François Cesarini	15,228	58.10	
FN	Anne-Sophie Rigault	10,984	41.90	
Turnout		26,212	35.91	
LREM gain from PS				

=== 2012 ===
Legislative Election 2012: Vaucluse's 1st constituency
Party	Candidate	Votes	%	±%
PS	Michèle Fournier-Armand	11,107	27.45	
FN	Thibaut de La Tocnaye	9,862	24.37	
UMP	Valérie Wagner	9,619	23.77	
FG	André Castelli	5,990	14.80	
EELV	Mohamed Zaidat	1,171	2.89	
Others	N/A	2,719		
Turnout		40,468	55.83	
2nd round result
PS	Michèle Fournier-Armand	18,264	45.25	
FN	Thibaut de La Tocnaye	11,309	28.02	
UMP	Valérie Wagner	10,787	26.73	
Turnout		40,360	55.68	
PS gain from UMP				

=== 2007 ===
Legislative Election 2007: Vaucluse's 1st constituency
Party	Candidate	Votes	%	±%
UMP	Marie-Josée Roig	18,720	44.69	
PS	Michèle Fournier-Armand	8,858	21.15	
MoDem	Jeannine Calves	3,368	8.04	
FN	Thibaut de La Tocnaye	3,265	7.79	
PCF	André Castelli	2,869	6.85	
Far left	Abdellatif Dehy	1,196	2.86	
LV	Marie-Paule Lolo	999	2.38	
Others	N/A	2,512		
Turnout		42,580	59.51	
2nd round result
UMP	Marie-Josée Roig	22,479	56.71	
PS	Michèle Fournier-Armand	17,160	43.29	
Turnout		41,677	58.25	
UMP hold				

=== 2002 ===
Legislative Election 2002: Vaucluse's 1st constituency
Party	Candidate	Votes	%	±%
UMP	Marie-Josée Roig	17,888	41.16	
PS	Cecile Helle	11,659	26.83	
FN	Thibaut de La Tocnaye	8,389	19.30	
PCF	Andre Castelli	1,899	4.37	
Others	N/A	3,624		
Turnout		44,251	64.79	
2nd round result
UMP	Marie-Josée Roig	22,612	58.36	
PS	Cecile Helle	16,135	41.64	
Turnout		40,725	59.63	
UMP gain from PS				

=== 1997 ===
Legislative Election 1997: Vaucluse's 1st constituency
Party	Candidate	Votes	%	±%
RPR	Marie-Josée Roig	13,166	30.40	
PS	Elisabeth Guigou	12,698	29.31	
FN	Thibaut de La Tocnaye	10,349	23.89	
PCF	Henri Talau	3,185	7.35	
GE	Aime Guenoun	887	2.05	
Others	N/A	3,031		
Turnout		45,342	68.66	
2nd round result
PS	Elisabeth Guigou	20,030	41.98	
RPR	Marie-Josée Roig	19,739	41.37	
FN	Thibaut de La Tocnaye	7,946	16.65	
Turnout		49,071	74.30	
PS gain from RPR				
