= Souad Zitouni =

French politician

Member of the National Assembly for Vaucluse's 1st constituency
- In office 30 March 2020 – 21 June 2022
- Preceded by: Jean-François Cesarini
- Succeeded by: Joris Hébrard

Personal details
- Born: 23 April 1974 (age 52) Boukadir, Algeria
- Party: La République En Marche!
- Education: Aix-Marseille University
- Profession: Lawyer

Souad Zitouni (Arabic: سعاد زيتوني; born 23 April 1974 in Boukadir) is a French lawyer and politician of La République En Marche! (LREM) who served as a member of the National Assembly from 2020 to 2022, representing the Vaucluse's 1st constituency.

== Early life and education ==
Zitouni was born in 1974 in Algeria, she was four years old when her family moved to France, to Marseille.

Zitouni studied at Aix-Marseille University, where she obtained a master's degree in public law and a specialized graduate diploma in local government management. She continued her training in law school. She practiced law from 2004 at the Avignon Carpentras bars.

== Political career ==
Zitouni began her political activism with Ecology Generation, before joining the Democratic Movement. In 2008, she was a candidate for her party in the 2008 municipal elections at Pontet, on the Ambition Le Pontet list led by Michel Bouyol: in sixth position, she was not elected.

Ten years later, Zitouni joined La République En Marche! and campaigned for Emmanuel Macron during the presidential election of 2017. She was a candidate in the legislative elections in Vaucluse's 1st constituency, as substitute candidate for Jean-François Cesarini. They were elected, with 58% in the second round against a candidate from the National Front. Cesarini died on March 29, 2020, and Zitouni automatically succeeded him the next day.

In parliament, Zitouni joined the LREM group. She served on the Committee on Sustainable Development and Regional Planning.

In 2020, Zitouni joined En commun (EC), a group within LREM led by Barbara Pompili.

Zitouni lost her seat in the first round of the 2022 French legislative election.

== Political positions ==
In 2020, Zitouni went against her parliamentary group's majority and abstained from an important vote on a much discussed security bill drafted by her colleagues Alice Thourot and Jean-Michel Fauvergue that helps, among other measures, curtail the filming of police forces.
