= Academia Christiana =

French traditionalist Catholic identitarian organisation

- Formation: 2013; 13 years ago
- Founder: Julien Langella
- Type: Identitarian and traditionalist Catholic organisation
- Region served: France
- President: Victor Aubert
- Vice-president: Julien Langella
- Parent organization: Association culturelle d'éducation intégrale (ACEI)
- Subsidiaries: Comunautat occitana; Cercle parisien; Cercle lyonnais
- Website: www.academiachristiana.org

Academia Christiana is a French identitarian and traditionalist Catholic organisation founded in 2013 by Julien Langella, a co-founder of Génération Identitaire. It holds an annual summer conference that brings together various strands of the French far right.

== Activity ==
Academia Christiana was founded in 2013 by Julien Langella, in the wake of La Manif pour tous. It was sponsored by the Priestly Fraternity of Saint Peter.

In August 2026, the president of Collectif Némésis, Alice Cordier, asked Elon Musk to reinstate the previously suspended accounts of Academia Christiana, Notre-Dame de Chrétienté, the priest Matthieu Raffray and the March for Life on X. Musk reinstated them the same day.

== Ideology ==
Academia Christiana is a traditionalist Catholic and identitarian organisation that seeks to promote a "third way" between what it calls "liberal globalism and Marxist alter-globalisation". Some of its members are trained by the Institut Iliade, a far-right think tank founded in 2014. In 2018, the organisation signed a call for a union of the right launched by Robert Ménard. During the 2022 French presidential election, Academia Christiana endorsed Éric Zemmour.

Academia Christiana is opposed to immigration and rejects Islam and green politics. It also spreads an antisemitism that Libération describes as virulent, for instance by recommending in its reading list antisemitic works by Jacques Ploncard d'Assac, Henri Delassus and Pierre Hillard.

The organisation opposes abortion and takes part in several Marches for Life.

Its founder, Julien Langella, advocates a revolution to place "a political power independent of elections" at the head of the state and to carry out a campaign of "remigration". According to StreetPress, the organisation channels traditionalist Catholics towards radical nationalist-revolutionary groups, thereby contributing to their growth.

Le Monde journalist Sébastien Bourdon described Academia Christiana as a vehicle for a "nationalist syncretism" with a "Catholic binder". Noting that "traditionalist Catholicism and references to Nazism" intersect within it, he pointed to the range of radical far-right groups invited to its summer conferences, to the straight-arm salute made by Victor Aubert alongside Groupe Union Défense activists during a 2016 Manif pour tous demonstration, to Aubert's laudatory comment about the antisemite Alain Soral in 2020, and to Academia Christiana's use of a neo-Nazi activist as a model.

== Organisation ==
=== Summer conference ===
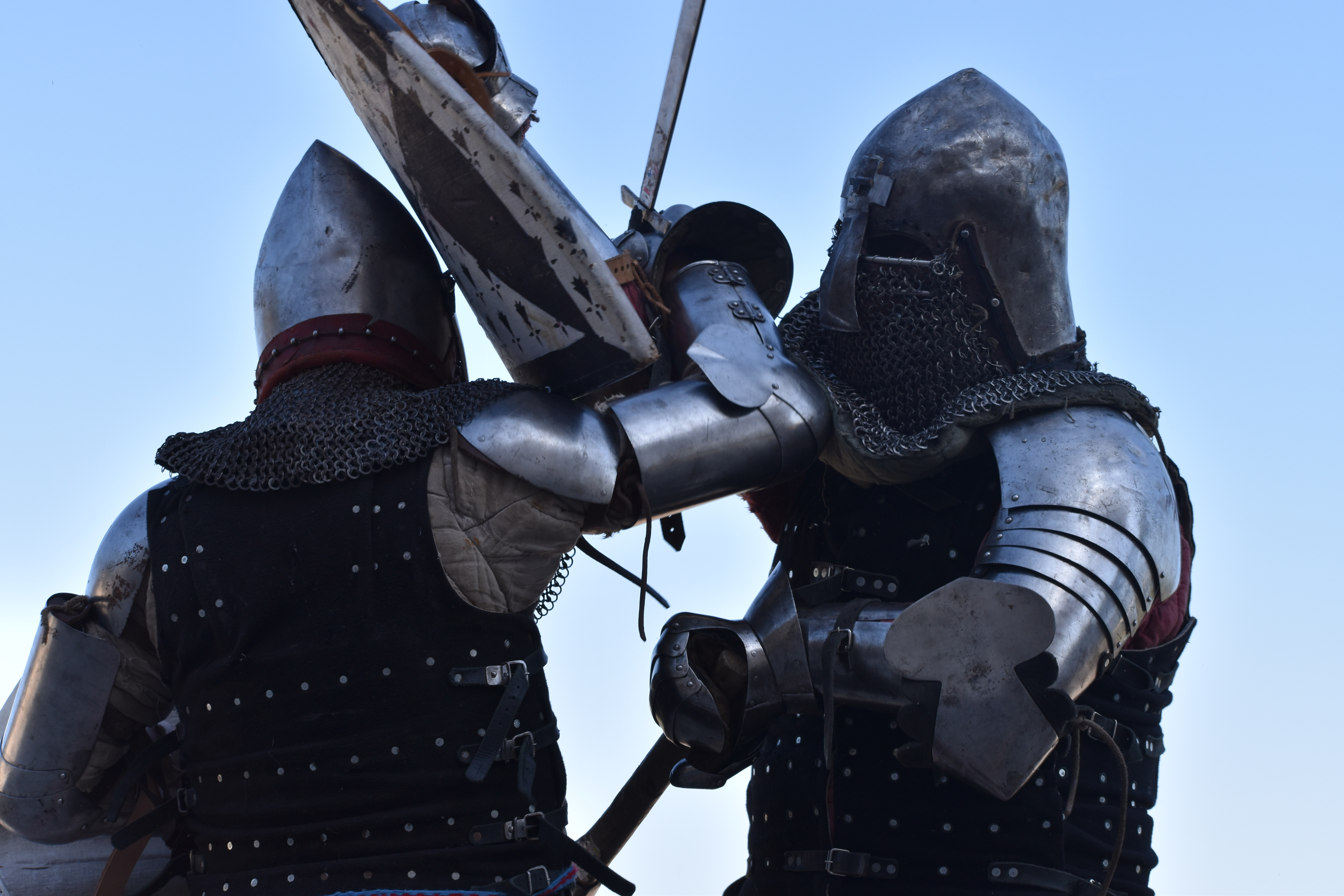
A buhurt fight at an Academia Christiana summer conference.

Described by L'Opinion as a reactionary think tank, Academia Christiana holds an annual summer conference featuring lectures, introductions to combat sports (including Muay Thai) and Tridentine Masses.

The organisation invites a broad spectrum of the French far right to the event, including national-Catholics, nationalist-revolutionaries, neo-fascists and identitarians. According to historian Nicolas Lebourg, what unites these different far-right currents at the summer conference is the importance they attach to ethnicity. Political scientist Jean-Yves Camus considers that the organisation belongs to the "cultural and groupuscular ghetto".

In 2019, the organisation planned to invite Marion Maréchal to its summer conference. She eventually cancelled, as her entourage advised her against appearing at an "anti-Soros" and "anti-'LGBT lobby'" event.

=== Members ===
Academia Christiana's founder, Julien Langella, founded the Aix-en-Provence branch of the Jeunesses identitaires and was later one of the founders of Generation Identity. He is also a former activist of Action Française. Golias describes him as an "admirer of Mussolini".

The organisation is chaired by Victor Aubert, a former philosophy teacher at the Institut Croix des Vents in Sées, in the Orne department, a private school outside the state contract system run by the Priestly Fraternity of Saint Peter. Langella is the organisation's vice-president.

One of its members, Louis de Cacqueray-Valménier, is a National Rally councillor in Le Mans. Several members of Academia Christiana belong to Civitas. Some are also the subject of fiches S.

== Proposed dissolution ==
On 10 December 2023, Minister of the Interior Gérald Darmanin announced on Brut his intention to dissolve the organisation in the Council of Ministers "in the coming weeks". Following this announcement, Academia Christiana received support from the far right, including from Éric Zemmour. The organisation stated it would challenge what it called an "absurd procedure" before the Council of State. On 12 December, it filed a defamation complaint against Darmanin, who had claimed the day before that Academia Christiana had shown "very strong support for the collaboration of Marshal Pétain".

The dissolution never went ahead, as the decree was never presented to the Council of Ministers. While Civitas was dissolved in the following weeks, Academia Christiana was not, which raised questions about a possible mistake by the minister, who may have confused the two groups.

== Local branches ==
Following the threats of dissolution by the Ministry of the Interior, the association began a process of fragmentation, placing Academia Christiana under the umbrella of the Association culturelle d'éducation intégrale (ACEI), which also oversees the Communitas Christiana network of local groups. The organisation thus sponsors Comunautat occitana, based in Toulouse, which offers "the same services as Academia Christiana with the same speakers", followed by the "Cercle parisien" and the "Cercle lyonnais".

In 2026, La Vie described the Cercle parisien as the organisation's branch in the capital. It organises lectures and gatherings; the magazine reported about forty participants at one of these evenings and also mentioned activities such as pilgrimages and workshops.

== See also ==
- Identitarian movement
- Traditionalist Catholicism
