= Marie-Josée Roig =

French politician (1938–2024)

Mayor of Avignon
- In office 25 June 1995 – 5 April 2014
- Preceded by: Guy Ravier
- Succeeded by: Cécile Helle

Member of the National Assembly for Vaucluse's 1st constituency
- In office 20 June 2007 – 20 June 2012
- Preceded by: Alain Cortade
- Succeeded by: Michèle Fournier-Armand

Minister of Family
- In office 31 March 2004 – 29 November 2004
- President: Jacques Chirac
- Prime Minister: Jean-Pierre Raffarin
- Preceded by: Christian Jacob
- Succeeded by: Philippe Douste-Blazy

Personal details
- Born: 12 May 1938 Perpignan, France
- Died: 7 August 2024 (aged 86) Avignon, France
- Party: RPR; UMP

Marie-Josée Roig (French: [maʁi ʒoze ʁwaɡ]; 12 May 1938 – 7 August 2024), née Méliorat, was a French politician.

RPR and later UMP Mayor of Avignon from 1995 to 2014, she was also president of the Communauté d'agglomération du Grand Avignon from the time when it was established in 2001 until 2014.

Roig was deputy for Vaucluse from 1993 to 1997, and then from 2002 until her entry into the government on 31 March 2004 as Minister of Family and Childhood. She later became Minister Delegate for the Interior from 29 November 2004 to 31 May 2005, before once again finding herself on the National Assembly's benches for Vaucluse's 1st constituency between 2007 and 2012.

== Biography ==
=== Youth and training ===
Roig's mother was a schoolteacher, while her father was a typesetter for the regional daily newspaper L'Indépendant. She studied at the Faculty of Letters in Montpellier. She earned a licence in letters and a diploma in Romance philology. She began her career as a teacher of letters at the Lycée Alphonse-Daudet in Nîmes.

=== Political career ===
Roig joined the RPR after it was created in 1976. She was elected as an Avignon municipal councillor in 1983 on Jean-Pierre Roux's list, becoming his assistant in charge of culture.

Roig was elected deputy on the RPR ticket for the first time in 1993, in Vaucluse's 1st constituency, having run against Jean-Pierre Roux, a dissident right-wing candidate. Two years later, in June 1995, she was elected Mayor of Avignon.

At the time of the 1997 French legislative election, Roig was standing for reelection. However, she was beaten by Élisabeth Guigou in a three-way race.

Roig was reelected Mayor of Avignon in March 2001 in a race against Élisabeth Guigou, and yet again in March 2008.

At the time of the 2002 French legislative election, Roig won a deputy's seat with 58.36% of the vote in a race against Cécile Helle and was part of the UMP group, a newly created political party. It was furthermore at her side that Jacques Chirac chose to announce publicly his candidacy for the presidency of the Republic.

Roig was Minister of Family and Childhood from March to November 2004. On 29 November 2004, in the wake of a government shuffle after Nicolas Sarkozy's election to the UMP's presidency, she was named Minister Delegate for the Interior, alongside Dominique de Villepin, replacing Jean-François Copé. On 31 May 2005, Roig's functions came to an end with the government's resignation following the result of the 2005 French European Constitution referendum.

At the time of the 2007 French legislative election, Roig managed to get herself reelected deputy of Vaucluse's 1st constituency with 56.71% of the vote in a race against Michèle Fournier-Armand.

Roig appeared in last position on Thierry Mariani's Vaucluse list for regional elections in March 2010 in Provence-Alpes-Côte d'Azur.

In January 2012, Roig publicly announced her intention not to represent herself at the June 2012 legislative elections in Vaucluse's 1st constituency. She indicated, rather, that she would be a candidate for her own succession in the Avignon 2014 municipal elections, but then changed her mind in December 2012.

After it came to light that Roig's son had been hired as a parliamentary assistant, working in the last five years of her last legislature, and given the suspicions of fictitious jobs, which she denied, Roig announced on 21 October 2013 that she would not have her name on entrepreneur Bernard Chaussegros's list (Chaussegros had been invested by the UMP to lead a future list with a view to the 2014 Avignon municipal elections).

== Later years and death ==
After leaving politics, Roig lived outside the public eye in neighbouring Gard, until she was admitted to the Avignon hospital centre's longterm care unit.

=== Death ===
Roig died in Avignon on 7 August 2024, at the age of 86.

== Summary of mandates ==
- 14 March 1983 – 19 March 1989: Assistant to the Mayor of Avignon, Vaucluse
- 20 March 1989 – 25 June 1995: Municipal councillor of Avignon, Vaucluse
- 2 April 1993 – 21 April 1997: Deputy for Vaucluse's 1st constituency
- 25 June 1995 – 5 April 2014: Mayor of Avignon, Vaucluse
- 16 March 1998 – 15 November 2002: Regional councillor of Provence-Alpes-Côte d'Azur
- 1 January 2001 – 5 April 2014: President of the Communauté d'agglomération du Grand Avignon
- 19 June 2002 – 30 April 2004: Deputy for Vaucluse's 1st constituency (nomination as member of the government)
- 31 March 2004 – 29 November 2004: Minister of Family and Childhood
- 29 November 2004 – 31 May 2005: Minister Delegate for the Interior
- 20 June 2007 – 20 June 2012: Deputy for Vaucluse's 1st constituency

== Distinctions ==
- — Officière de la Légion d'honneur; decorated by the President of the Republic, Jacques Chirac on 19 January 2007.

== See also ==
- List of Mayors of Avignon (in French)
