= Seine-Saint-Denis's 6th constituency =

Constituency of the National Assembly of France

6th constituency of Seine-Saint-Denis
- inline Constituency of the National Assembly of France

- Deputy: Bastien Lachaud; LFI
- Department: Seine-Saint-Denis

The 6th constituency of Seine-Saint-Denis is a French legislative constituency in Seine-Saint-Denis.

== Historic representation ==
Election	Member	Party
1967	Jean Lolive	PCF
1968	Jean Lolive	PCF
1973	Jacqueline Chonavel	PCF
1978	Jacqueline Chonavel	PCF
1981	Claude Bartolone	PS
1986	Proportional representation – no election by constituency	
1988	Claude Bartolone	PS
1993	Claude Bartolone	PS
1997	Claude Bartolone	PS
2002	Claude Bartolone	PS
2007	Claude Bartolone	PS
2012	Élisabeth Guigou	PS
2017	Bastien Lachaud	LFI
2022	Bastien Lachaud	LFI

== Election results ==
=== 2024 ===
Candidate	Party	Alliance	First round			Second round		
Candidate	Party	Alliance	Votes	%	+/–	Votes	%	+/–
Bastien Lachaud	LFI	NFP	25,777	71.68	+14.50			
Nathalie Sack	UDI	ENS	5,014	13.94	-6.36			
Nacéra Salhaoui	DIV		4,175	11.61	N/A			
Nathalie Arthaud	LO		996	2.77	+0.39			
Valid votes			35,962	97.89				
Blank votes			518	1.41	-0.15			
Null votes			257	0.70	+0.01			
Turnout			36,737	60.40	+20.59			
Abstentions			24,086	39.60	-20.59			
Registered voters			60,823					
Source: Ministry of the Interior, Le Monde
Result						LFI HOLD		

=== 2022 ===
Legislative Election 2022: Seine-Saint-Denis's 6th constituency
Party	Candidate	Votes	%	±%
LFI (NUPÉS)	Bastien Lachaud	12,797	56.61	+5.87
LREM (Ensemble)	Yasmina Baziz	3,419	15.12	-12.20
RN	Françoise Trova	1,584	7.01	−0.39
DVG	Nabila Djebbari	1,248	5.52	N/A
UDI (UDC)	Kourtoum Sackho	1,172	5.18	−1.59
REC	Noélie Beugré	560	2.48	N/A
LO	Nathalie Arthaud	537	2.38	−0.28
Others	N/A	1,290		
Turnout		23,127	39.81	+1.99
2nd round result
LFI (NUPÉS)	Bastien Lachaud	16,046	75.40	+20.39
LREM (Ensemble)	Yasmina Baziz	5,236	24.60	−20.39
Turnout		21,282	38.40	+4.31
LFI hold				

=== 2017 ===
Legislative Election 2017: Seine-Saint-Denis's 6th constituency
Party	Candidate	Votes	%	±%
LREM	Alexandre Aidara	5,304	27.32	N/A
LFI	Bastien Lachaud	3,756	19.35	N/A
PS	Élisabeth Guigou	3,453	17.79	−28.33
PCF	Patrick Le Hyaric	1,701	8.76	−8.57
FN	Line Valles	1,437	7.40	−2.80
UDI	Karine Franclet	1,315	6.77	N/A
EELV	Nadia Azoug	940	4.84	+0.52
LO	Nathalie Arthaud	517	2.66	+0.19
Others	N/A	988		
Turnout		19,893	37.82	−7.99
2nd round result
LFI	Bastien Lachaud	9,196	55.01	N/A
LREM	Alexandre Aidara	7,522	44.99	N/A
Turnout		17,927	34.09	−1.94
LFI gain from PS		Swing		

=== 2012 ===
2012 legislative election in Seine-Saint-Denis's 6th constituency
Candidate	Party	First round		Second round	
Candidate	Party	Votes	%	Votes	%
Élisabeth Guigou	PS	10,390	46.12%	14,376	100.00%
Patrick Le Hyaric	FG	3,905	17.33%		
Ilona Zsoter	UMP	3,021	13.41%		
Cyril Bozonnet	FN	2,299	10.20%		
Christine Ratzel-Togo	EELV	974	4.32%		
Nathalie Arthaud	LO	557	2.47%		
Claire Vigeant	MoDem	545	2.42%		
Linda Sehili	NPA	183	0.81%		
Patrick Lozès	SE	163	0.72%		
Christian Van Houcke	AEI	146	0.65%		
Palmerido Valente	DVG	139	0.62%		
Kamélia Kincaid	POI	107	0.47%		
Jérôme Sinpaseuth	SP	101	0.45%		
Valid votes		22,530	98.44%	14,376	79.85%
Spoilt and null votes		357	1.56%	3,626	20.14%
Votes cast / turnout		22,887	45.81%	18,003	36.03%
Abstentions		27,079	54.19%	31,963	63.97%
Registered voters		49,966	100.00%	49,966	100.00%

=== 2007 ===
Legislative Election 2007: Seine-Saint-Denis's 6th constituency
Party	Candidate	Votes	%	±%
PS	Claude Bartolone	12,979	39.16	+2.54
UMP	Jean-Claude Dupont	9,206	27.78	+2.03
PCF	Augusta Epanya	2,832	8.55	−1.46
MoDem	Hacène Abdesselam	2,212	6.67	N/A
LV	Hélène Zanier	1,524	4.60	N/A
FN	Françoise Bardou	1,450	4.38	−7.12
Far left	Mireille Allemand	1,142	3.45	N/A
Others	N/A	1,797		
Turnout		33,773	55.37	−5.69
2nd round result
PS	Claude Bartolone	19,758	64.62	+4.95
UMP	Jean-Claude Dupont	10,817	35.38	−4.95
Turnout		31,659	51.90	−3.76
PS hold				

=== 2002 ===
Legislative Election 2002: Seine-Saint-Denis's 6th constituency
Party	Candidate	Votes	%	±%
PS	Claude Bartolone	11,683	36.62	+9.64
UMP	Jean-Claude Dupont	8,214	25.75	N/A
FN	Catherine Dupuy	3,668	11.50	−5.45
PCF	Josiane Bernard	3,192	10.01	−5.74
DIV	Roger Sanvee	677	2.12	N/A
Others	N/A	2,778		
Turnout		32,417	61.06	−1.63
2nd round result
PS	Claude Bartolone	16,791	59.67	−1.35
UMP	Jean-Claude Dupont	11,351	40.33	N/A
Turnout		29,535	55.66	−9.74
PS hold				

=== 1997 ===
Legislative Election 1997: Seine-Saint-Denis's 6th constituency
Party	Candidate	Votes	%	±%
PS	Claude Bartolone	8,998	26.98	
UDF	Jean-Jacques Salles	6,772	20.30	
FN	Samuel Bellenger	5,663	16.95	
PCF	Jacques Isabet	5,254	15.75	
LO	Arlette Laguiller	2,686	8.05	
LV	Pierre Mathon	1,309	3.92	
GE	Dominique Monier	729	2.19	
LCR	Bernard Lombardo	705	2.11	
Others	N/A	1,250		
Turnout		34,329	62.69	
2nd round result
PS	Claude Bartolone	20,575	61.02	
UDF	Jean-Jacques Salles	13,143	38.98	
Turnout		35,804	65.40	
PS hold				
