= Guy Ravier =

French politician (1937–2023)

Mayor of Avignon
- In office 1989–1995
- Preceded by: Jean-Pierre Roux
- Succeeded by: Marie-Josée Roig

Personal details
- Born: 29 November 1937 Avignon, France
- Died: 12 October 2023 (aged 85)
- Party: Socialist Party

Guy Ravier (French pronunciation: [ɡi ʁavje]; 29 November 1937 – 12 October 2023) was a French politician.

== Early life ==
Guy Ravier was born on 29 November 1937 in Avignon.

== Career ==
Ravier served as a member of the National Assembly from 1988 to 1993. He was also the Mayor of his hometown, Avignon, from 1989 to 1995.

== Death ==
Ravier died on 12 October 2023, at the age of 85.
