= Student Cockade =

The Student Cockade La Cocarde étudiante
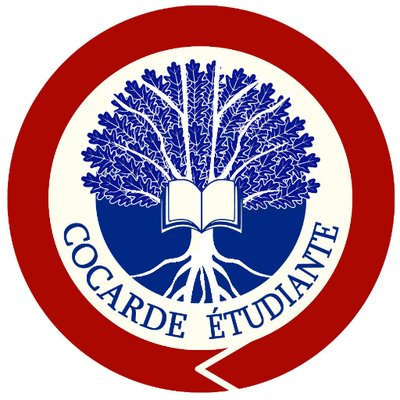
- Motto: Pour l'union de la droite "For the unity of the right"
- Institution: France's universities
- Location: 92, rue d'Assas 75006 Paris, France
- Established: 6 May 2015
- President: Edouard Bina
- Website: www.cocardeetudiante.com

The Student Cockade (French: Cocarde étudiante) is a far-right souverainist French student union, founded in 2015 at the University of Paris II Panthéon-Assas in France. It claims to have a presence at 22 different universities across France.

== History ==
The Student Cockade was founded on 6 May 2015 in the Panthéon-Assas University as a split of the already existing right-wing student union Union nationale inter-universitaire (UNI). It was founded as a way to unite the different youth wings of the right-wing political parties in France (mostly, Droite Populaire, Front national, Debout la France, Parti chrétien-démocrate).

During the year 2018 the Student Cockade was made famous by its fierce and sometimes violent opposition to university blocus.

During the student elections of 2019 at the University of Nanterre, fighting broke out between a group of Student Cockade members and left wing antifascists. The Student Cockade won multiple seats after the incident.

During the 2020 student elections in France, on numerous instances, the Student Cockade was opposed by left wing student groups and antifascist movements, but the Student Cockade managed to win multiple seats in Sorbonne, Assas, Nanterre and other universities.

== Organisation ==
Year		President
2015	2016	Maxime Duvauchelle
2017	2019	Quentin Limongi
2019	2022	Luc Lahalle
2022	2024	Vianney Vonderscher
2024	present	Edouard Bina

== See also ==
Union nationale inter-universitaire
