= Julien Rochedy =

French politician (born 1988)

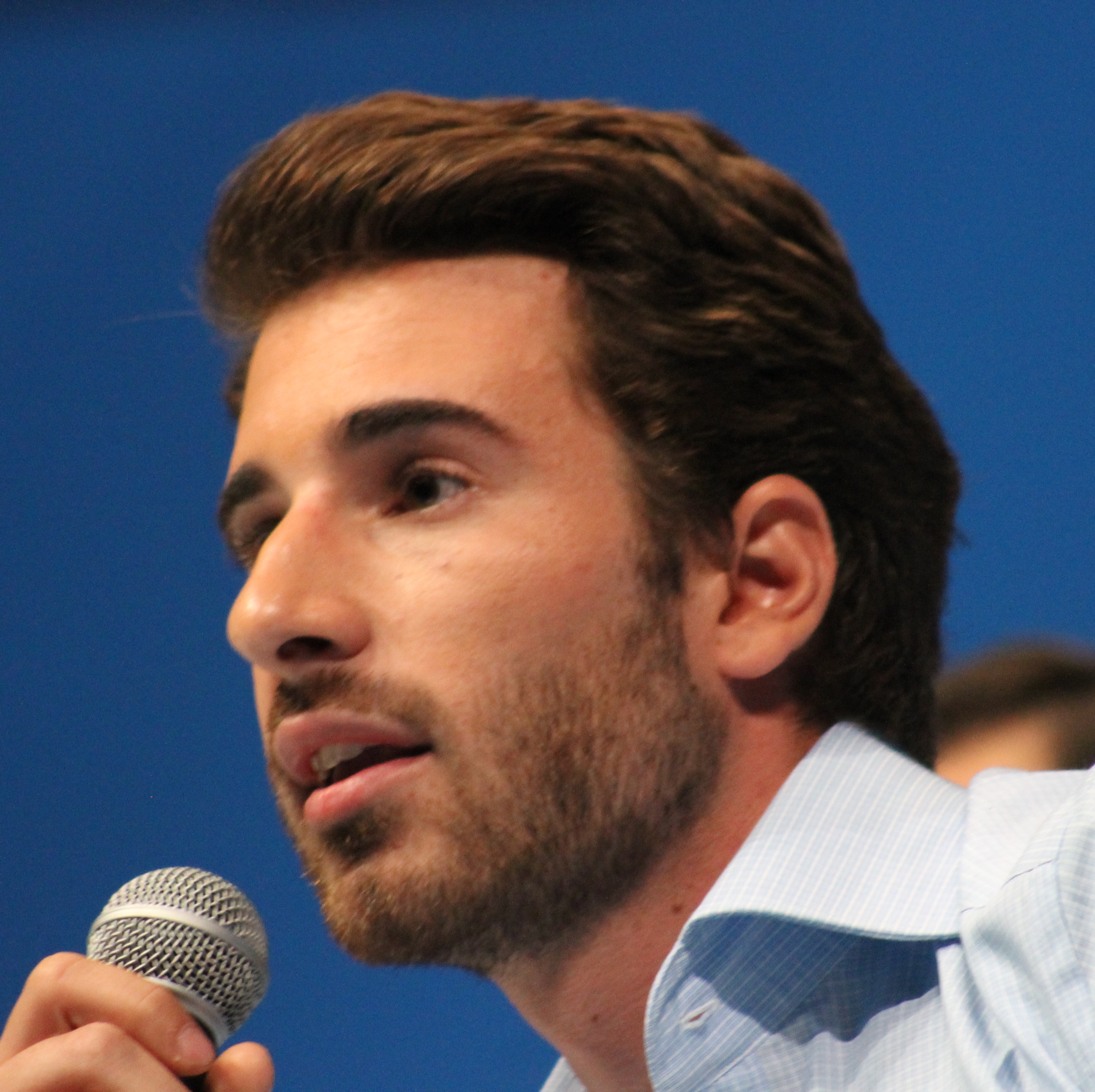
Rochedy in 2012

Julien Louis Rochedy (born 10 March 1988) is a French politician from the National Rally. He was President of Génération Nation from 2012 to 2014.

== Early life and education ==
He was born in Guilherand-Granges in Ardèche. He graduated from Jean Moulin University Lyon 3.

== Political career ==
He was a candidate in the 2014 European Parliament election.

== Political activities ==
He met Syrian President Bashar al-Assad in 2014. He operates a popular YouTube channel.

== Personal life ==
From 2019 to 2020, he was in a relationship with right-wing social media influencer Eva Vlaardingerbroek. He is also a speaker of occitan, referring to this as very strong part of a broader identity.
