= Collectif Némésis =

Identitarian women's organisation in Europe

- President: Alice Cordier
- Founder: Alice Cordier
- Founded: 2019; 7 years ago
- Membership: c. 100
- Ideology: Anti-immigration; Anti-Islam; Feminism; Femonationalism; Identitarianism; Conservatism
- Political position: Far-right

Website
- collectif-nemesis.com

The Collectif Némésis (French: [kɔlɛktif nemezis]; lit. 'Nemesis Collective') is a far-right political organisation for women aged 18 to 30, describing itself as feminist and Identitarian. The organisation was founded in France and expanded to Switzerland and Belgium. The organisation is named after Nemesis, the Greek goddess of revenge, and was founded by Alice Cordier in 2019. The organisation believes in a connection between immigration and crime. It believes that non-European immigrants, particularly Muslims, are more likely to commit violence towards women. The organisation has been condemned as racist by other feminist organisations, such as Collectif NousToutes in France and the Grève féministe du 14 juin in Switzerland.

== History ==
The organisation first appeared on 23 November 2019 at the "Collectif NousToutes" (All of us Women) demonstration in Paris, in which it carried placards saying that 52% of rapists in Île-de-France were foreign, and ones reading "Cologne, Rotherham, soon [Paris]". After the event, the group said that other feminist groups are run by the extreme left and "prefer to focus on anecdotal themes (inclusive writing, sexism in advertising, etc.). And they only deal with the violence that women suffer daily (such as street harassment) by drowning it in abstract concepts such as that of patriarchy, to hide the fact that our attackers are massively of non-European origin".

In January 2021, the group wore niqabs at the Eiffel Tower to promote a "No Hijab Day" in opposition to World Hijab Day. In November 2021, the group infiltrated the NousToutes annual demonstration with several members of the far-right Cocarde étudiante to stage a protest against Afghan refugees.

On 9 June 2024, the group infiltrated the 2024 French protests against the National Rally to stage a protest against the left-wing New Popular Front. In an Instagram post later that day, the group declared that it had "used our freedom of expression to remind the country what the New Popular Front really is: a collection of violent abusers, terrorist supporters, and antisemites." In November 2024, Cordier applauded the victory of Donald Trump in the 2024 United States presidential election. Later that month, Le Monde reported that the group had used the Le Pen family manor in Montretout to plan an attempt to disrupt the annual NousToutes demonstration. Cordier denied knowledge of the manor's history, saying that the meeting had been organised by a member of the collective. Further reporting by Libération indicated that the group had previously organised other meetings in the manor.

In January 2025, the group staged a protest interrupting the inauguration of Anne Vignot (The Ecologists) as Mayor of Besançon, unveiling a banner reading "foreign rapists welcome" and releasing a statement accusing Vignot of being "clearly unwilling to protect the women of her city against the dangers brought by immigration." Later that month, French Minister of the Interior Bruno Retailleau sparked controversy when he applauded the group at a conference hosted by the Centre de Réflexion sur la Sécurité Intérieure. During a Q&A session, Cordier asked Retailleau about a possible judicial dissolution of the Jeune Garde Antifasciste, to which he expressed support for the idea and told Cordier "thank you for your efforts, you know it means a lot to me."

In March 2026, the group announced that it would not participate in the International Women's Day demonstrations in Paris organised by the Collectif national pour les droits des femmes (CNDF) after the CNDF and other feminist groups asked Parisian police to ban the group from participating. Anne Leclerc of the CNDF told the press that Némésis "are absolutely not feminists," accusing the group of "disturbing our demonstrations to perpetuate messages of hate against immigrants, perpetuating disinformation, and going after our members." Later that month, controversy was sparked after a photo of Cordier from 2022 showing posing with two neo-Nazis resurfaced on Twitter. Cordier denied knowingly making a neo-Nazi pose, saying that "the far-left's obsession with Nazism is becoming suspicious... [when the photo was taken] I was a kid, in a bar, and a stranger was showing a rap group's pose."

=== Killing of Quentin Deranque ===
On 12 February 2026, the Collectif Némésis organised a protest against a speech to be given by La France Insoumise MEP Rima Hassan at the Institut d'études politiques de Lyon in Lyon, unfurling a banner outside the venue declaring "Islamo-leftists, out of our universities." A clash subsequently broke out between two opposing groups of demonstrations, after which 23-year-old far-right activist Quentin Deranque, who was there to provide security for Némésis, was beaten and killed. Many of the arrested individuals were linked to the outlawed far-left collective Jeune Garde Antifasciste. Several subsequent journalistic investigations revealed that Némésis had repeatedly coordinated with far-right groups in Lyon to provoke clashes with left-wing activists.

=== Outside of France ===
In 2021, the group launched in Romandy, the French-speaking part of Switzerland. The Swiss group has tried to gain attention at the Grève féministe du 14 juin (Feminist strike), whose representatives responded that "This group is riding the purple bandwagon and uses it not to promote the freedom of women, but rather the discrimination towards its targets, notably foreigners". By June 2022, Némésis had been expelled three times from events organised by Grève feministe. In April 2022, it was expelled from a social event organised by the University of Geneva. In October 2023, it was reported that some members of the Swiss People's Party, the country's leading party at federal level, had joined Némésis.

Since 2025, the organisation has been active in Belgium.

In December 2025, a man attacked Cordier with flour when she visited MCC Bruxelles, the branch of the Hungarian state-funded university Mathias Corvinus Collegium.

== See also ==
- Conservative variants of feminism
