= Rima Hassan =

French-Palestinian jurist, activist and politician (born 1992)

Rima Hassan MEP
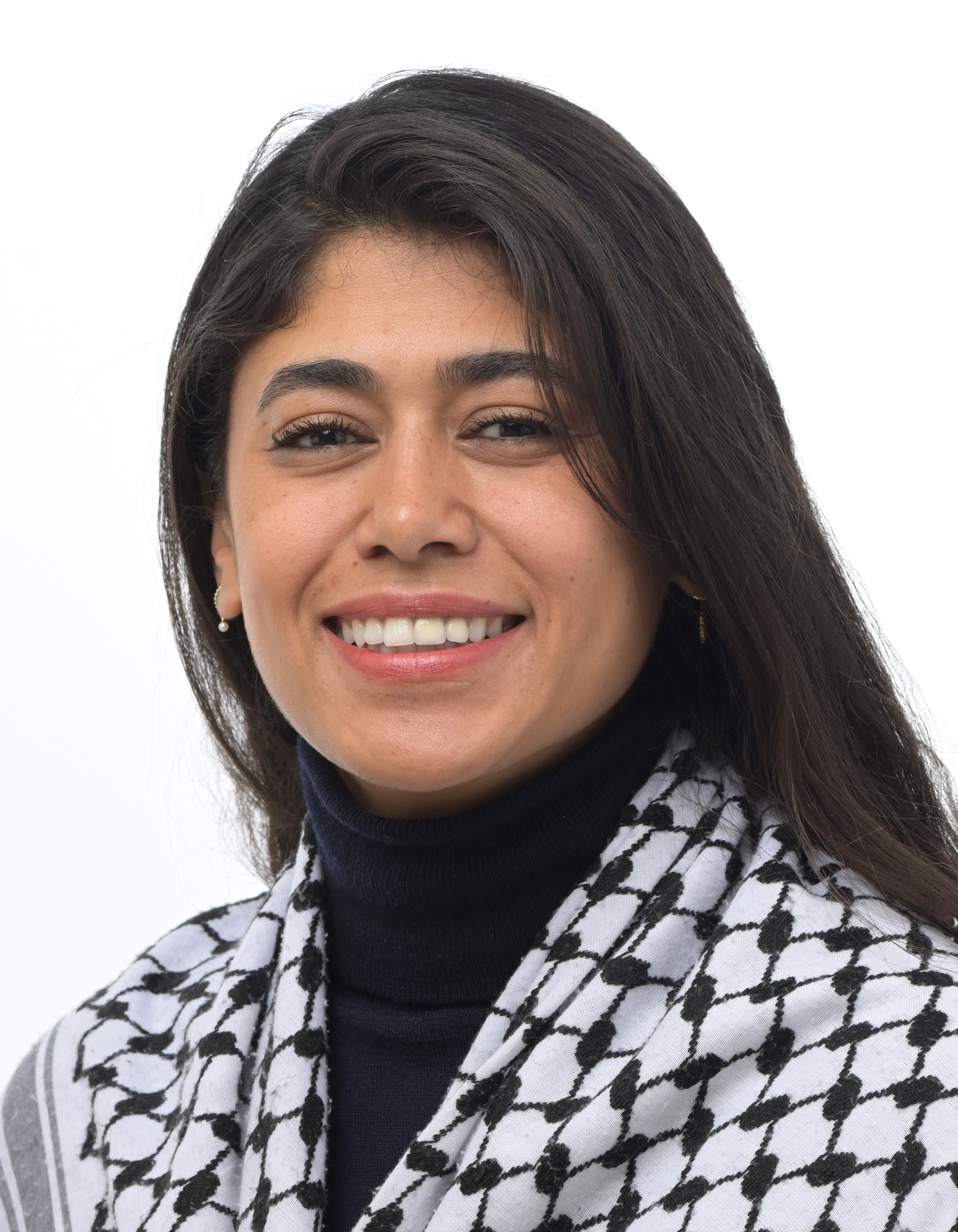
- Official portrait, 2024

Member of the European Parliament for France
- Incumbent
- Assumed office 16 July 2024

Personal details
- Born: Rima Hassan Mobarak; 28 April 1992 (age 34) Neirab camp, Aleppo, Syria
- Citizenship: France (since 2010); Stateless (until 2010)
- Party: LFI (2023–present)
- Education: Paris 1 Panthéon-Sorbonne University; Université de Montpellier; University of Évry Val d'Essonne
- Occupation: Jurist; lawyer; politician

Rima Hassan Mobarak (Arabic: ريما حسن مبارك, romanized: Rīmā Ḥasan Mubārak; born 28 April 1992) is a French jurist and politician of Palestinian and Syrian origin, born in the Neirab refugee camp, near Aleppo, Syria. Stateless, she arrived in France around the age of nine and settled with her family in Niort. After obtaining French nationality upon reaching adulthood, she earned a master's degree in international law from Panthéon-Sorbonne University.

In 2019, Hassan founded the Refugee Camps Observatory, an NGO dedicated to the study and protection of refugee camps worldwide. In 2023, she founded the Action Palestine France collective. That same year, she joined La France Insoumise to contest the 2024 European Parliament election on Manon Aubry's list. She was elected to the European Parliament on 9 June 2024.

== Early life and education ==
Rima Hassan Mobarak was born on 28 April 1992 in the Neirab camp, near Aleppo, Syria, the youngest of six children. Her mother, Nabiha (1958–2021), was a teacher, while her father, Ahmad, is a former mechanic in the Syrian Air Force. Her paternal grandparents, Palestinians originally from the village of Al-Birwa located near Acre, resettled in Syria following the Nakba in May 1948. Her maternal grandmother came from a prominent Syrian Kurdish family, the Hananu, and married a Palestinian refugee from Salfit; although she came from a prestigious family, she chose to live with him in the refugee camp.

Due to an unhappy marriage, Hassan's mother left the camp shortly after her birth and moved to France, where she reunited with one of her sisters. She spent eight years attempting to regain custody of her children and transfer them to France. After her mother regained custody, Hassan arrived in France around the age of nine. She settled in Niort, in the Deux-Sèvres department (district), with her mother, sister and four brothers. She was elected to the Niort children's municipal council in 2003. She studied there at Ernest Pérochon Primary School. During this time, her mother worked in restaurants to support the family. Hassan suffered from hate speech in school, including ethnic slurs like 'bougnoule' (wog) by her classmates. As a result, she stopped speaking Arabic. She obtained a scientific baccalaureate from La Venise Verte High School in 2011.

Stateless until adulthood, she obtained French nationality in 2010. As soon as she reached the age of majority, she sought to travel to Palestine via Tel Aviv, intending to "finally discover the land of her ancestors", but she was prevented from boarding at Charles de Gaulle Airport. After these events, she pursued studies in law and obtained her bachelor's degree. For this, she spent two years at the University of Évry, then one year at the University of Montpellier, until 2014. She spent a year in Lebanon and completed her master's degree in 2016 at Panthéon-Sorbonne University (Paris 1). She focused on the legal comparison between South Africa and Israel in a master's thesis in international law on the issue of apartheid. According to her, obtaining her degree from Panthéon-Sorbonne was a source of great pride for her mother because the university's reputation would have been known even in the Neirab camp.

== Career ==
=== Work ===
Hassan joined the French Office for the Protection of Refugees and Stateless Persons (OFPRA) in 2016, and after 18 months, she worked at the National Court of Asylum Law for six years until 2023. In 2019, she founded the NGO 'Refugee Camps Observatory'. The following year, Hassan participated in a roundtable organized by Emmaus for the World Refugee Day, on 20 June. In 2022, the Interministerial Delegation for Reception and Integration dedicated a portrait to her as an "Inspirational Woman". That same year, she revisited the notion of "fraternity" from the French national motto in a podcast, along with other participants.

On 3 February 2023, she spoke at the French Senate for the symposium "Israel-Palestine: State of Affairs" organized by Paris Senator Esther Benbassa, in collaboration with L'Histoire and the French Research Center in Jerusalem. Her intervention addressed the issue of apartheid in Israeli society. Following the Hamas attack on 7 October 2023, amid the bombing of the Gaza Strip and the ground offensive launched by Israel, she terminated her contract with the National Court of Asylum Law and declined an advocacy position on migration issues offered by Amnesty International. Instead, she moved back to the Neirab refugee camp, "to be close to her people" and established the Action Palestine France collective on Telegram. Until November 2023, she also advised L'Oréal on diversity and refugee integration issues.

In August 2023, Hassan participated in the summer days organized by The Ecologists, alongside the rapper Médine or the politician Clémentine Autain. Also in August 2023, Forbes ranked Hassan among the "40 exceptional women who have marked the year and who have made France shine internationally". In January 2024, this nomination was contested by Yonathan Arfi, the president of the Conseil Représentatif des Institutions juives de France ("Representative Council of French Jewish Institutions"; CRIF) who accused her of "justifying the atrocities of 7 October" by Hamas and by the television presenter Arthur who accused her of "lauding terrorism". Following this controversy, Forbes canceled the awards ceremony. In response, Hassan filed a complaint against Arthur for defamation.

=== Member of the European parliament ===
On 30 April 2024, Hassan was summoned by the police for questioning regarding allegations of publicly condoning an act of terrorism. The allegations related to comments she made on social media in the winter of 2023. Hassan said she was "calm, confident, and ready to fully cooperate with the judicial police officers, in whom [she has] complete confidence". She criticised "the political pressures aimed at compromising [her] freedom of expression [at] a crucial political moment for the future of the French", referring to the European elections that year. In the 2024 European Parliament election in France, Hassan joined the list of La France Insoumise (LFI), where she was placed seventh, after also being approached to be on the list of The Greens but in a non-eligible position. She was elected. She explains her political commitment to LFI's list by the "urgent need to act politically now" regarding the situation in the Gaza Strip.

In July 2024, The Left in the European Parliament – GUE/NGL proposed Hassan as vice-president of the Human Rights Subcommittee. The day after this proposal, fellow MEP François-Xavier Bellamy (The Republicans) used his connections to block her election to this position by accusing her of antisemitism. In response, she published several messages on X about Bellamy. (Note: "For the moment, François-Xavier Bellamy and his cronies, close to the Israeli genocidal regime, sleep well at night. It won't last." and "The cowardice that drives you here is the same as that which is in your empty and evasive gaze when I pass you in the corridors of the European Parliament. Tremble. This is only the beginning.") Following these messages, Bellamy filed a complaint for "threats and incitement to commit a crime or offence against an elected official", believing that she had "named him for the vindictiveness of Islamist circles". Following Bellamy's complaint, the President of the European Parliament, Roberta Metsola, opened an investigation to determine whether Hassan had breached the institution's code of conduct. In response, Hassan also filed a complaint against Bellamy for "public defamation and slanderous denunciation".

On 22 August 2024, deputies from the presidential Renaissance party announced their intention to appeal to the public prosecutor to have Hassan's parliamentary immunity lifted for having participated in a pro-Palestinian demonstration in Amman, Jordan. Placards held during the demonstration paid tribute to Ismail Haniyeh, the Hamas political leader who had recently been assassinated in Tehran. Hassan said the demonstration, which takes place every Friday, was a recurring demonstration in support of the Palestinians and was not pro-Hamas. She said she was not responsible for the actions of others at the demonstration. The Renaissance deputies also accused her of fuelling antisemitism. She stated that those who accuse her are "known for their position of support for a genocidal regime that I fight and that I will continue to fight with or without a mandate of a MEP".

On 23 January 2025, the European Parliament adopted a non-binding resolution demanding the immediate and unconditional release of Franco‑Algerian writer Boualem Sansal, imprisoned in Algeria since November 2024 under national security charges. The motion passed overwhelmingly (533 votes for, 24 against, 48 abstentions). Hassan, as member for La France Insoumise, was among 24 MEPs who voted against the resolution. She said she opposed the "instrumentalisation" of Sansal's case by the political right and far‑right, given the already stormy relations between France and Algeria. Her vote, while all French MEPs outside GUE/NGL voted in favour of the resolution, was widely criticised in the French political class. Manuel Bompard responded that "The exclusive focus on the vote of MEP Rima Hassan while other MEPs voted in the same vote or abstained speaks volumes about their racist ideology".

== Political positions and activism ==
=== Living conditions of refugees and reception of migrants ===
In May 2020, Hassan expressed concern to Agence France-Presse about the health and security effects of the COVID-19 pandemic in refugee camps. In September 2020, she intervened within a collective and associations to call on the French government and local elected officials to mobilize to welcome refugees and thus help improve the humanitarian situation in the Mória camp in Greece.

=== Israeli–Palestinian conflict ===
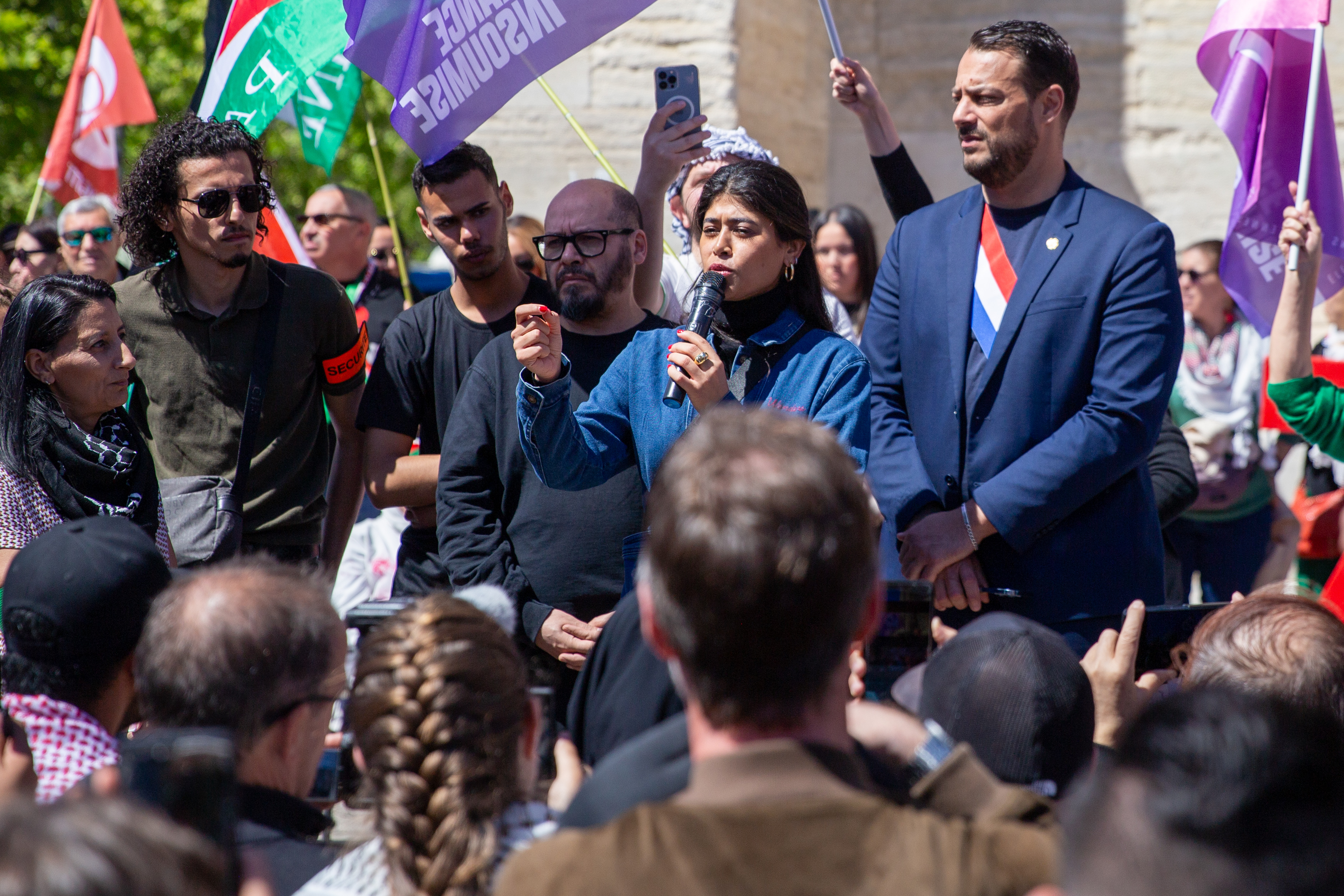
Hassan speaking at a protest in support of the Palestinian people in Marseille in April 2024

Hassan has long advocated the creation of a democratic bi-national state as a solution to the Israeli–Palestinian conflict. She wrote in November 2023 that "there will be no two-state solution", and that "the solution is a democratic and secular bi-national state." Explaining herself later, she specified that she "dreams" of a bi-national state with peaceful coexistence of Palestinians and Israelis, and is in favor of the two-state solution, a solution defended by her party La France Insoumise.

Hassan uses the pro-Palestinian slogan "from the river to the sea", which she states "has existed for a very long time, and historically has absolutely nothing to do with Hamas." Deploring the fact that Palestinians who have been expelled from their homeland can no longer return there, she also uses the term "apartheid" to describe Israel's oppression of the Palestinians. In May 2024, Hassan faced controversy for a message she posted on X (formerly Twitter) accusing the CRIF of having dictated to the French Minister of Foreign Affairs, Stéphane Séjourné, a declaration concerning Israel.

==== Gaza war ====
From the beginning of the Gaza war, Hassan has been critical of the actions taken by Israel. She stated in an online interview following the Hamas attack that it was "morally unacceptable to rejoice in the deaths of civilians". She said the political and media establishment asked her to "transform [this] natural empathy into support for the State of Israel" and questioned "whether a Palestinian life is worth an Israeli life", which she said was "ludicrous". She condemned equally "Hamas' war crimes", "Israel's impunity", and the "genocide" of the Palestinians. (Note: It is often claimed that she said that Hamas actions were justified, in fact she was asked to answer "true" or "false" to several statements. In that interview, she answers "true" to the question "Is Hamas carrying out a legitimate action?" and "false" to the question "Does the State of Israel have a right of defence?" Hassan asked for the interview to be broadcast in full "so that she could share her thoughts and refute the attacks made against her. According to the media's editor-in-chief, the edited teaser was "out of context" and produced without their agreement. Throughout the interview, Hassan describes the actions of Hamas as "terrorist" and deems "legitimate" only the group's political wing, the winner of the 2006 Palestinian legislative elections, denouncing as "illegitimate" its attack on October 7 and any other crimes. Furthermore, she recalls that in the United Nations General Assembly resolution of 30 November 1973, the General Assembly reaffirmed "the legitimacy of the struggle of peoples for independence, territorial integrity and liberation from colonial and alien domination and foreign control by all means in their power, including armed struggle.")

In 2024, Hassan described the October 7 attacks as "legitimate," leading French authorities to summon her for questioning on suspicion of advocating terrorism; her scheduled participation in the Forbes France Women’s Summit was subsequently canceled amid widespread public backlash. In August of that year, she reportedly appeared at a pro-Hamas rally in Amman, prompting approximately 50 members of the French National Assembly to petition the president of the European Parliament to revoke her parliamentary immunity. In December, she stated that "If Franco-Israelis are allowed to serve in the Israeli army while enjoying the benefits of dual nationality. Any Franco-Palestinian must be able to join the Palestinian armed resistance whose legitimacy is recognized by the United Nations resolutions relating to the right to self-determination of peoples. The only thing that prevents you from considering it is the coloniality of the world".

On 24 February 2025, Hassan was denied entry to Israel as part of an EU-Palestine delegation, with Israeli authorities citing her support boycotts of Israel. In response to a question about whether Hamas was responsible for the kidnapping and killing of the Bibas family, Hassan tweeted "Kfir, Ariel and Shiri Bibas were killed by an Israeli strike. This had also been communicated and confirmed in November 2023", she further responded "would there have been Hamas and, in particular, the attacks of the 7th, if there had not been an illegal occupation and an illegal blockade imposed on the Gaza Strip for decades?"

===== Gaza Freedom Flotilla =====
On 1 June 2025, Hassan embarked on the British-flagged yacht Madleen, operated by the pro-Palestinian Freedom Flotilla Coalition (FFC), which sailed from Catania, Italy, in an attempt to breach Israel's naval blockade of the Gaza Strip with a cargo of rice, baby formula and medical equipment. On board were another eleven activists, including Swedish climate campaigner Greta Thunberg and Brazilian Thiago Ávila. Passengers described the voyage as non-violent direct political resistance seeking to draw global attention to Gaza's humanitarian crisis and to pressure governments to facilitate aid delivery.

In the early hours of 9 June 2025, Israeli naval commandos intercepted the Madleen in international waters approximately 185 km off Gaza's coast, deploying drones to encircle the vessel, spraying a white substance onto its deck, jamming communications, and ordering passengers to discard mobile phones before boarding. After boarding, the yacht was towed to Ashdod Port, where all twelve activists underwent medical examinations and were detained under Israeli law. Four activists, including Thunberg, agreed to voluntary deportation, while eight, among them Hassan and Ávila, refused to sign expulsion papers and remained in custody pending judicial hearings.

The European Parliament, led by President Roberta Metsola, engaged Israeli authorities to safeguard MEP Hassan. Spain summoned the Israeli ambassador in Madrid in protest, and Turkey condemned the interception as a breach of freedom of navigation. Human rights organisations such as Adalah state that the seizure in international waters amounted to unlawful detention or piracy. After writing "Free Palestine" on a wall, Hassan was placed in solitary confinement, and went on a hunger strike. She was ultimately expelled on 12 June and deported to Paris. The United Nations' special rapporteur Francesca Albanese and other international figures called for further flotilla missions to challenge the blockade and deliver essential aid to Gaza.

== Cyberbullying ==
Amid the events of 2023 and 2024, Hassan became the target of a harassment campaign by a pro-Israel group of about thirty members. Her phone number was reportedly doxxed via Telegram, leading to an onslaught of death and rape threats directed at her. She was also sent imagery of Palestinians being brutalized.

== Arrest ==
On 2 April 2026, Hassan was taken into police custody in France as part of an investigation into an alleged "apologie du terrorisme"- showing support for terrorism, related to a deleted social media post referencing the 1972 Lod Airport massacre. In the post, Hassan quoted a comment made by one of the convicted perpetrators of the attack in an attempt to justify it in light of what he said was the "oppression" of people in the Palestinian territories. Prosecutors were informed of Hassan's social media post by far-right politician Matthias Renault. La France Insoumise party said her detention was part of a programme to silence supporters of Palestine. A small amount of synthetic drugs was allegedly found in her possession at the time of her detention. Hassan said she carried cannabidiol (CBD) products that were legally purchased in Brussels. The Paris prosecutor's office later confirmed that the trace amounts of tetrahydrocannabinol found in the CBD were too low to be considered a crime. Hassan was released after questioning and was summoned to a criminal court hearing on 7 July 2026 in relation to her social media post. The following week, Hassan's lawyer announced that she had filed a complaint for breach of confidentiality against a spokesperson of the Justice Ministry that had allegedly leaked information about her arrest to the press. UN Special Rapporteurs appointed by the Human Rights Council have stated that the institutional response to Rima Hassan’s views is characteristic of "political and judicial harassment" as part of a "growing trend of repression by the French authorities against those who defend the rights of the Palestinian people".
