= 2026 French municipal elections =

- 15 March 2026 (1st round); 22 March 2026 (2nd round)

34,875 municipal councillors; 1,254 community councillors
- Registered: 48,474,213
- Turnout: 57.10% ▲12.4pp (1st round); 57.03% ▲15.2pp (2nd round)
	Majority party	Minority party	Third party
	DVD	DVG	DVC
Party	Miscellaneous right	Miscellaneous left	Miscellaneous centre
Last election	30,557	22,630	12,852
Seats won	32,869	19,184	16,453
Seat change	▲2,312	▼3,446	▲3,601
Popular vote	4,311,798 (1st round); 2,036,416 (2nd round)	2,594,991 (1st round); 1,371,199 (2nd round)	2,092,043 (1st round); 955,060 (2nd round)
Percentage	25.47% (1st round); 22.94% (2nd round)	15.33% (1st round); 15.45% (2nd round)	12.36% (1st round); 10.76% (2nd round)
Swing	▲8 pp	▲0.4 pp	▲4 pp

The 2026 French municipal elections were held on 15 and 22 March 2026 to elect the municipal councils of the approximately 35,000 communes in France.

== Background ==
During the last municipal election in 2020, which was marked by the COVID-19 pandemic and the highest abstention rate for local elections in French history, the left reversed the trend of 2014. They narrowed the vote gap with the right by flipping cities such as Annecy, Bordeaux, Marseille, and Saint-Paul. Nevertheless, the right managed to reclaim several cities from the left, including Metz. The National Rally strengthened its local presence, winning the city of Perpignan while holding all the municipalities it controlled.

The 2022 French presidential election and legislative election saw the power of President of France Emmanuel Macron and his presidential majority weakened by the rise of both the far-right and the left. Concurrently, The Republicans were further diminished, resulting in their smallest parliamentary group since the start of the Fifth Republic.

In the European Parliament election of June 9, 2024, the National Rally saw its support soar, while the presidential majority list lost nearly half it seats. The left entered the election divided, despite having previously united in 2022 under NUPES. The joint list of the Socialist Party and Place Publique, as well as La France Insoumise, gained seats, while the French Communist Party again failed to secure representation, and The Ecologists plummeted from 13 seats to just five.

On the evening of the results of the European election, Emmanuel Macron dissolved the National Assembly. New legislative elections were held on June 30 and July 7, 2024, further upending an already disrupted political landscape. The left reunited and formed the New Popular Front in just a few hours. The Republicans faced an unprecedented crisis when their president, Éric Ciotti, formed an alliance with the National Rally. Though the centrists, headed by Renaissance, struggled with the president's decision to dissolve parliament, they maintained their Ensemble pour la République coalition.

Between the second round of voting, faced with the surge of the far-right, the left called for a "Republican Front", which most qualifying candidates joined. The final results saw the left-wing alliance NFP win a narrow plurality of 193 deputies. The National Rally became the largest single-party group in the National Assembly with 125 deputies, while Éric Ciotti formed his own group with 18 candidates. The center suffered a major collapse, losing one-third of its representatives.

Many mayors have resigned since 2020.

=== Campaign ===
The race in Paris was considered to be important for the 2027 French presidential election, in a fierce battle between the left and right. The election in Nice was also competitive between centre-right and far-right. Overall, the left was successful in cities such as Paris, Marseille, and Lyon, while the right was successful in cities including Nice and Toulouse.

== Results ==
26,182,365 valid votes were cast in the first round, and 9,391,407 valid votes were cast in the second round.

=== Overview ===
National results by political affiliation of the lists for the municipal elections of March 2026 in municipalities with 3,500 inhabitants and more, and in all municipalities that are the chief towns of arrondissements
Lists		First round				Second round				Total seats			Total cities won	
Lists		Votes	%	Seats	Cities won	Votes	%	Seats	Cities won	Number	%	+/-	Number	%
Miscellaneous right	DVD	4,311,798	25,47	23,701	832	2,036,416	22,94	9,168	286	32,869	31,96	+2,312	1,118	34,06
Miscellaneous left	DVG	2,594,991	15,33	13,647	438	1,371,199	15,45	5,537	161	19,184	18,66	-3,446	599	18,25
Miscellaneous centre	DVC	2,092,043	12,36	11,628	398	955,060	10,76	4,825	152	16,453	16,00	+3,601	550	16,76
Union of the Left	UG	2,086,148	12,32	2,933	82	1,669,771	18,81	2,811	60	5,744	5,59	+1,514	142	4,33
Miscellaneous	DIV	1,594,324	9,42	11,890	393	538,579	6,07	4,568	160	16,458	16,00	+3,079	553	16,85
National Rally	RN	937,299	5,54	1,034	16	612,131	6,90	1,361	26	2,395	2,33	+1,568	42	1,28
La France Insoumise	FI	654,691	3,87	216	1	260,711	2,94	377	6	593	0,58	+547	7	0,21
The Republicans	LR	561,117	3,31	1,910	61	227,110	2,56	971	31	2,881	2,80	-2,292	92	2,80
Union of the Right	UD	516,965	3,05	594	18	548,613	6,18	479	11	1,073	1,04	-294	29	0,88
Union of the Centre	UC	348,967	2,06	538	17	208,561	2,35	421	10	959	0,93	+355	27	0,82
Union of the Far-Right	UXD	243,308	1,44	118	1	179,355	2,02	407	10	525	0,51	New	11	0,34
Socialist Party	PS	228,607	1,35	1,023	35	78,461	0,88	239	6	1,262	1,23	-1,307	41	1,25
Far right	EXD	175,349	1,04	205	5	30,697	0,35	90	1	295	0,29	+144	6	0,18
Far left	EXG	149,954	0,89	59	0	13,769	0,16	13	0	72	0,07	+41	0	0,00
Regionalist	REG	105,512	0,62	275	9	63,136	0,71	254	7	529	0,51	+10	16	0,49
French Communist Party	COM	66,606	0,39	469	18	10,156	0,11	56	1	525	0,51	-901	19	0,58
Union of Democrats and Independents	UDI	64,739	0,38	281	9	18,390	0,21	72	2	353	0,34	-566	11	0,34
The Ecologists	VEC	61,674	0,36	35	1	13,968	0,16	73	2	108	0,11	-407	3	0,09
Various environmentalists	ECO	55,608	0,33	178	5	20,361	0,23	126	4	304	0,30	-552	9	0,27
Union of the Right for the Republic	UDR	24,998	0,15	48	1	16,112	0,18	51	1	99	0,10	New	2	0,06
Reconquête	REC	18,160	0,11	6	0					6	0,01	New	0	0,00
Horizons	HOR	13,726	0,08	29	1	3,520	0,04	2	0	31	0,03	New	1	0,03
Right-wing sovereignists	DSV	10,872	0,06	38	1					38	0,04	New	1	0,03
Democratic Movement	MoDem	7,586	0,04	51	2					51	0,05	-52	2	0,06
Renaissance	RE	4,866	0,03	28	1					28	0,03	-596	1	0,03
Total		16,929,908	100	70,934	2,345	8,876,076	100	31,901	937	102,835	100	+3,292	3,282	100

=== Elected mayors of large municipalities ===
Commune	Department	2020 elected mayor	Party	2026 elected mayor	Party
Agen	Lot-et-Garonne	Jean Dionis du Séjour	MoDem	Laurent Bruneau	PS
Aix-en-Provence	Bouches-du-Rhône	Maryse Joissains-Masini	LR	Sophie Joissains	UDI
Ajaccio	Corse-du-Sud	Laurent Marcangeli	DVD	Stéphane Sbraggia	HOR
Albi	Tarn	Stéphanie Guiraud-Chaumeil	HOR	Stéphanie Guiraud-Chaumeil	HOR
Alençon	Orne	Joaquim Pueyo	DVG	Sophie Douvry	DVD
Amiens	Somme	Brigitte Fouré	UDI	Frédéric Fauvet	PS
Angers	Maine-et-Loire	Christophe Béchu	DVD	Christophe Béchu	HOR
Angoulême	Charente	Xavier Bonnefont	HOR	Xavier Bonnefont	HOR
Annecy	Haute-Savoie	François Astorg	ECO	Antoine Armand	RE
Annonay	Ardèche	Simon Plenet	PS	Simon Plenet	PS
Argenteuil	Val-d'Oise	Georges Mothron	LR	Georges Mothron	LR
Asnières-sur-Seine	Hauts-de-Seine	Manuel Aeschlimann	LR	Manuel Aeschlimann	LR
Auch	Gers	Christian Laprebende	PS	Camille Bonne	PS
Aulnay-sous-Bois	Seine-Saint-Denis	Bruno Beschizza	LR	Bruno Beschizza	LR
Aurillac	Cantal	Pierre Mathonier	PS	Patrick Casagrande	DVD
Auxerre	Yonne	Crescent Marault	HOR	Mathieu Debain	DVC
Avignon	Vaucluse	Cécile Helle	PS	Olivier Galzi	DVD
Beauvais	Oise	Franck Pia	UDI	Franck Pia	UDI
Belfort	Territoire de Belfort	Damien Meslot	LR	Damien Meslot	LR
Besançon	Doubs	Anne Vignot	EELV	Ludovic Fagaut	LR
Béziers	Hérault	Robert Ménard	DVD	Robert Ménard	DVD
Blois	Loir-et-Cher	Marc Gricourt	PS	Marc Gricourt	PS
Bordeaux	Gironde	Pierre Hurmic	EELV	Thomas Cazenave	RE
Boulogne-Billancourt	Hauts-de-Seine	Pierre-Christophe Baguet	LR	Pierre-Christophe Baguet	LR
Bourges	Cher	Yann Galut	DVG	Yann Galut	DVG
Bourg-en-Bresse	Ain	Jean-François Debat	PS	Jean-François Debat	PS
Brest	Finistère	François Cuillandre	PS	Stéphane Roudaut	DVD
Brive-la-Gaillarde	Corrèze	Frédéric Soulier	LR	Frédéric Soulier	LR
Caen	Calvados	Joël Bruneau	LR	Aristide Olivier	DVD
Calais	Pas-de-Calais	Natacha Bouchart	LR	Natacha Bouchart	LR
Cannes	Alpes-Maritimes	David Lisnard	LR	David Lisnard	LR
Cayenne	French Guiana	Sandra Trochimara	DVG	Sandra Trochimara	DVG
Chalon-sur-Saône	Saône-et-Loire	Gilles Platret	DVD	Gilles Platret	DVD
Champigny-sur-Marne	Val-de-Marne	Laurent Jeanne	SL	Laurent Jeanne	SL
Charleville-Mézières	Ardennes	Boris Ravignon	DVD	Boris Ravignon	DVD
Chartres	Eure-et-Loir	Jean-Pierre Gorges	DVD	Ladislas Vergne	DVD
Châteauroux	Indre	Gil Avérous	LR	Gil Avérous	LR
Cherbourg-en-Cotentin	Manche	Benoît Arrivé	PS	Camille Margueritte	DVD
Clermont-Ferrand	Puy-de-Dôme	Olivier Bianchi	PS	Julien Bony	LR
Cognin	Savoie	Franck Morat	PS	Franck Morat	PS
Colombes	Hauts-de-Seine	Patrick Chaimovitch	EELV	Joakim Giacomoni	LR
Corbeil-Essonnes	Essonne	Bruno Piriou	DVG	Samira Ketfi	LR
Courbevoie	Hauts-de-Seine	Jacques Kossowski	LR	Jacques Kossowski	LR
Créteil	Val-de-Marne	Laurent Cathala	PS	Laurent Cathala	PS
Dijon	Côte-d'Or	François Rebsamen	PS	Nathalie Koenders	PS
Dole	Jura	Jean-Baptiste Gagnoux	LR	Jean-Baptiste Gagnoux	LR
Drancy	Seine-Saint-Denis	Aude Lagarde	UDI	Jean-Christophe Lagarde	UDI
Dunkerque	Nord	Patrice Vergriete	DVG	Patrice Vergriete	DVG
Evreux	Eure	Guy Lefrand	DVD	Guy Lefrand	DVD
Epinal	Vosges	Patrick Nardin	DVD	Benoit Jourdain	LR
Faaa	French Polynesia	Oscar Temaru	Tavini	Oscar Temaru	Tavini
Fort-de-France	Martinique	Didier Laguerre	PPM	Didier Laguerre	PPM
Gap	Hautes-Alpes	Roger Didier	DVD	Roger Didier	DVD
Grenoble	Isère	Éric Piolle	EELV	Laurence Ruffin	DVG
Guéret	Creuse	Marie-Françoise Fournier	ECO	Marie-Françoise Fournier	ECO
La Roche-sur-Yon	Vendée	Luc Bouard	HOR	Romain Bossis	DVG
La Rochelle	Charente-Maritime	Jean-François Fountaine	DVG	Olivier Falorni	DVG
Laval	Mayenne	Florian Bercault	DVG	Florian Bercault	DVG
Le Havre	Seine-Maritime	Édouard Philippe	DVD	Édouard Philippe	HOR
Le Mans	Sarthe	Stéphane Le Foll	PS	Stéphane Le Foll	PS
Le Puy-en-Velay	Haute-Loire	Michel Chapuis	UDI	Michel Chapuis	UDI
Les Abymes	Guadeloupe	Éric Jalton	DVG	Éric Jalton	DVG
Lille	Nord	Martine Aubry	PS	Arnaud Deslandes	PS
Limoges	Haute-Vienne	Emile-Roger Lombertie	LR	Guillaume Guérin	LR
Lorient	Morbihan	Fabrice Loher	UDI	Fabrice Loher	UDI
Lyon	Lyon Metropolis	Grégory Doucet	EELV	Grégory Doucet	EELV
Mamoudzou	Mayotte	Ambdilwahedou Soumaila	LR	Ambdilwahedou Soumaila	LR
Manosque	Alpes-de-Haute-Provence	Camille Galtier	DVD	Camille Galtier	DVD
Marseille	Bouches-du-Rhône	Michèle Rubirola	EELV	Benoît Payan	DVG
Meaux	Seine-et-Marne	Jean-François Copé	LR	Jean-François Copé	LR
Mende	Lozère	Régine Bourgade	MoDem	Patrice Saint-Léger	LR
Mérignac	Gironde	Alain Anziani	PS	Thierry Trijoulet	PS
Metz	Moselle	François Grosdidier	LR	François Grosdidier	SL
Mont-de-Marsan	Landes	Charles Dayot	DVD	Frédéric Dutin	UG
Montauban	Tarn-et-Garonne	Marie-Claude Berly	UDR	Didier Lallemand	UDR
Montluçon	Allier	Frédéric Laporte	LR	Philippe Perche	DVD
Montpellier	Hérault	Michaël Delafosse	PS	Michaël Delafosse	PS
Montreuil	Seine-Saint-Denis	Patrice Bessac	PCF	Patrice Bessac	PCF
Mulhouse	Haut-Rhin	Michèle Lutz	LR	Frédéric Marquet	DVC
Nancy	Meurthe-et-Moselle	Mathieu Klein	PS	Mathieu Klein	PS
Nanterre	Hauts-de-Seine	Patrick Jarry	DVG	Raphaël Adam	DVG
Nantes	Loire-Atlantique	Johanna Rolland	PS	Johanna Rolland	PS
Narbonne	Aude	Bertrand Malquier	DVD	Bertrand Malquier	DVD
Nevers	Nièvre	Denis Thuriot	LREM	Denis Thuriot	RE
Nice	Alpes-Maritimes	Christian Estrosi	LR	Eric Ciotti	UDR
Nîmes	Gard	Jean-Paul Fournier	LR	Vincent Bouget	PCF
Niort	Deux-Sèvres	Jérôme Baloge	PRV	Jérôme Baloge	PRV
Nouméa	New Caledonia	Sonia Lagarde	LREM	Sonia Lagarde	RE
Orléans	Loiret	Serge Grouard	LR	Serge Grouard	DVD
Paris	Paris	Anne Hidalgo	PS	Emmanuel Grégoire	PS
Pau	Pyrénées-Atlantiques	François Bayrou	MoDem	Jérôme Marbot	PS
Périgueux	Dordogne	Emeric Lavitola	PS	Michel Cadet	HOR
Perpignan	Pyrénées-Orientales	Louis Aliot	RN	Louis Aliot	RN
Poitiers	Vienne	Léonore Moncond'huy	EELV	Anthony Brottier	DVC
Reims	Marne	Arnaud Robinet	LR	Arnaud Robinet	HOR
Rennes	Ille-et-Vilaine	Nathalie Appéré	PS	Nathalie Appéré	PS
Roubaix	Nord	Guillaume Delbar	DVD	David Guiraud	LFI
Rouen	Seine-Maritime	Nicolas Mayer-Rossignol	PS	Nicolas Mayer-Rossignol	PS
Rueil-Malmaison	Hauts-de-Seine	Patrick Ollier	LR	Patrick Ollier	LR
Saint-Brieuc	Côtes-d'Armor	Hervé Guihard	PP	Victor Bonnot	HOR
Saint-Denis	Réunion	Ericka Bareigts	PS	Ericka Bareigts	PS
Saint-Denis	Seine-Saint-Denis	Mathieu Hanotin	PS	Bally Bagayoko	LFI
Saint-Dizier	Haute-Marne	Quentin Brière	LR	Quentin Brière	LR
Saint-Étienne	Loire	Gaël Perdriau	LR	Régis Juanico	PS
Pamiers	Ariège	Frédérique Thiennot	DVC	Jean-Philippe Sannac	DVD
Rodez	Aveyron	Christian Teyssèdre	DVC	Stéphane Mazars	RE
Saint-Nazaire	Loire-Atlantique	David Samzun	PS	Johanna Rolland	PS
Saint-Pierre	Saint Pierre and Miquelon	Yannick Cambray	CSA	Yannick Cambray	CSA
Saint-Paul	Réunion	Huguette Bello	PLR	Emmanuel Séraphin	PLR
Saint-Pierre	Réunion	Michel Fontaine	LR	David Lorion	LR
Saint-Quentin	Aisne	Frédérique Macarez	LR	Frédérique Macarez	LR
Strasbourg	Bas-Rhin	Jeanne Barseghian	EELV	Catherine Trautmann	PS
Toulon	Var	Hubert Falco	LR	Josée Massi	DVD
Toulouse	Haute-Garonne	Jean-Luc Moudenc	LR	Jean-Luc Moudenc	LFA
Tourcoing	Nord	Gérald Darmanin	LREM	Doriane Bécue	DVD
Tours	Indre-et-Loire	Emmanuel Denis	EELV	Emmanuel Denis	EELV
Troyes	Aube	François Baroin	LR	François Baroin	LR
Valence	Drôme	Nicolas Daragon	LR	Nicolas Daragon	LR
Verdun	Meuse	Samuel Hazard	PS	Samuel Hazard	PS
Versailles	Yvelines	François de Mazières	DVD	François de Mazières	DVD
Vesoul	Haute-Saône	Alain Chrétien	Agir	Alain Chrétien	HOR
Vichy	Allier	Frédéric Aguilera	LR	Frédéric Aguilera	LR
Villeurbanne	Lyon Metropolis	Cédric Van Styvendael	PS	Cédric Van Styvendael	PS
Vitry-sur-Seine	Val-de-Marne	Pierre Bell-Lloch	PCF	Pierre Bell-Lloch	PCF

== By city ==
- 2026 Lyon municipal election
- 2026 Nancy municipal election
- 2026 Nice municipal election
- 2026 Paris municipal election
- 2026 Toulouse municipal election
- 2026 Marseille municipal election

== See also ==
- Municipal elections in France
- 2026 French Senate election
