= Economic Affairs Committee (French National Assembly) =

Committee for Economic Affairs
- 17th legislature
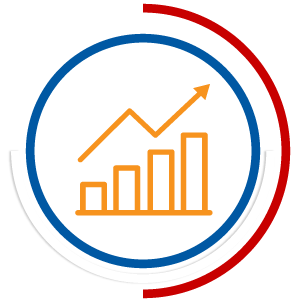

Leadership
- Chairwoman: Aurélie Trouvé, LFI since 9 October 2024
- Seats: 73

The Economic Affairs Committee is one of the eight standing committees of the French National Assembly.

== Jurisdiction ==
The powers of the Commission for Economic Affairs are as follows :

- Agriculture and fishing
- Energy and industries
- Applied research and innovation
- Aonsumption, internal and external trade
- Electronic communications
- Tourism
- Town planning and housing.

== List of chairperson ==
Portrait	Name	Constituency	Took office	Left office	Political party	Legislature
	François Brottes	Isère's 5th constituency	June 28, 2012	October 1, 2015	PS	14th legislature
	Frédérique Massat	Ariège's 1st constituency	October 1, 2015	June 20, 2017	PS	14th legislature
	Roland Lescure	French residents overseas's 1st constituency	June 29, 2017	June 21, 2022	LREM	15th legislature
	Guillaume Kasbarian	Eure-et-Loir's 1st constituency	June 30, 2022	February 8, 2024	RE	16th legislature
	Stéphane Travert	Manche's 3rd constituency	February 9, 2024	June 9, 2024	RE	16th legislature
	Antoine Armand	Haute-Savoie's 2nd constituency	July 20, 2024	September 21, 2024	EPR	17th legislature
	Aurélie Trouvé	Seine-Saint-Denis's 9th constituency	October 9, 2024	Incumbent	LFI-NFP	17th legislature

== Current Bureau's Committee ==
Composition of the bureau
Post	Name	Constituency	Group
Chairwoman	Aurélie Trouvé	Seine-Saint-Denis's 9th constituency	LFI-NFP
Vice-chair	Charles Fournier	Indre-et-Loire's 1st constituency	ÉCO
Vice-chair	Pascal Lecamp	Vienne's 3rd constituency	DEM
Secretary	Xavier Albertini	Marne's 1st constituency	HOR
Secretary	Sandra Marsaud	Charente's 2nd constituency	EPR
Secretary	Richard Ramos	Loiret's 6th constituency	DEM
Secretary	Vincent Rolland	Savoie's 2nd constituency	DR
