= Chappuis =

Chappuis (French: [ʃa.pɥi]) is a French-language surname from the Arpitan region of eastern France and Francophone Switzerland with various spellings. Notable people with the surname include:

- Robert "Bob" Richard Chappuis (1923–2012), American football player
- Charyl Chappuis, Swiss-Thai footballer
- Eduardo Dibós Chappuis (called "Chachi"), Peruvian politician
- Eliane Cat-Tuong Chappuis (born 1978), model, actress, singer, producer of Swiss descent
- Friedrich-Wilhelm von Chappuis (1886–1942), General der Infanterie
- Isabelle Chappuis (born 1971), Swiss politician
- James Chappuis (1854–1934), French chemist
- Jason Lamy-Chappuis (born 1986, Missoula, Montana, USA), Franco-American ski jumper and cross-country skier
- Liliane Chappuis (1955–2007), Swiss politician
- Marie de Sales Chappuis, aka Marie-Thérèse Chappuis, Roman Catholic abbess
- Paul Emile Chappuis (1816–1887), French photographer, inventor, and manufacturer
- Philippe Chappuis (born 1967), Swiss comics creator
- Eustace Chapuys (c. 1490/92–21 January 1556), Savoyard diplomat

There is also a scientific term named after the French chemist James Chappuis.

- Chappuis absorption, absorption bands in the ozone layer

== See also ==
- Musée Chappuis-Fähndrich, Develier, Canton of Jura, Switzerland
- Chapuis
