= François Astorg =

French politician (born 1961)

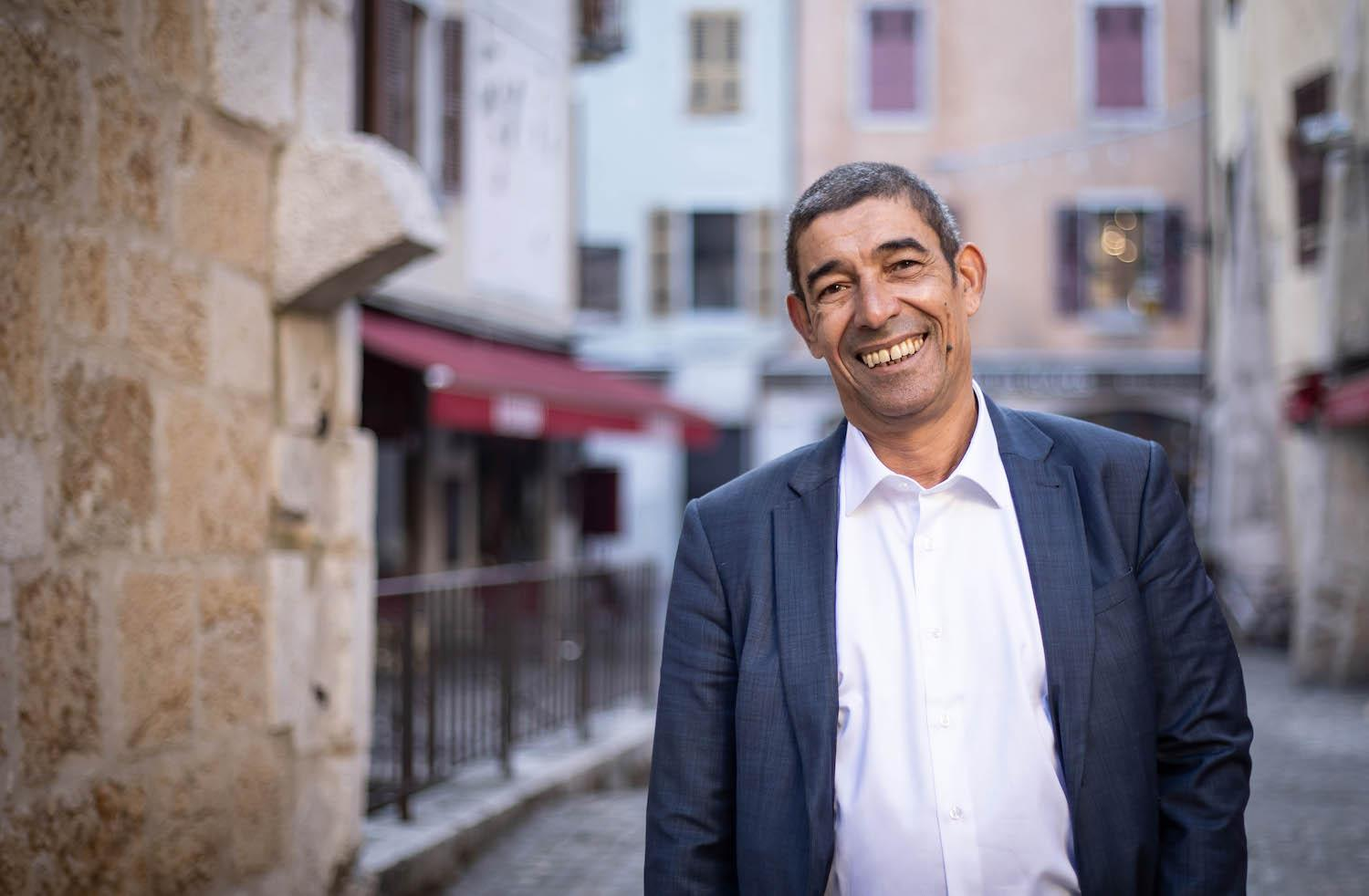
- Astorg in 2020

Mayor of Annecy
- In office 4 July 2020 – 28 March 2026
- Preceded by: Jean-Luc Rigaut
- Succeeded by: Antoine Armand

Personal details
- Born: 11 April 1961 (age 65) Villemomble, France
- Party: Independent
- Other political affiliations: The Greens (2009–2010); Europe Ecology – The Greens (2010–2016)

François Astorg (French pronunciation: [fʁɑ̃swa astɔʁɡ]; born 11 April 1961) is a French politician who served as mayor of Annecy from 2020 to 2026. He concurrently served as vice president for infrastructure and public transport of Grand Annecy (2020–2026) under the presidency of Frédérique Lardet. In the 2012 legislative election, he was a candidate in Haute-Savoie's 2nd constituency. An Independent whose 2020 bid was supported by Europe Ecology – The Greens, the Socialist Party and the French Communist Party, he declined to run for reelection to a second term as mayor in 2026 and retired from politics.

== Biography ==
Born in 1961 in Seine-Saint-Denis, to a father who was a real estate agent and a Franco-Senegalese stay-at-home mother, he is the brother of visual artist Philippe Astorg, who lives in Saint-Jorioz. François Astorg graduated (after one year of study) in communication and management from ICMA Paris.

At the age of 18, in 1979, while attending sailing school, he observed the L'Aurore race from a sailboat and crossed paths with the Fastnet Race. He escaped a violent storm off the coast of Ireland. This storm caused the deaths of 19 sailors and the sinking of 20 boats. Also in 1979, he survived a road accident. In 1988, he suffered a ruptured aneurysm that left him hemiplegic. He underwent surgery at the Pitié-Salpêtrière Hospital and regained the use of his limbs after a year of rehabilitation, but was left with significant damage to his left leg.

In 1991, François Astorg was appointed communications officer in the office of Jean-Yves Le Drian, then Secretary of State for Maritime Affairs.

In 1992, François Astorg met Michel Authier, a mathematician, philosopher, and sociologist. He then worked for eight years at Trivium, the company founded and headed by Michel Authier, developing human capital management software.

He is the co-founder of Cognito, a human resources, management, and data analysis consulting firm. In this capacity, he served as an analyst for the Édouard Philippe government during the Great National Debate that took place during the Yellow vests protests crisis. At the same time, François Astorg teaches at the École Nationale Supérieure des Mines de Saint-Étienne and the Université Savoie Mont Blanc. Since 2001, he has been teaching at the Geneva State Training Center and working as a trainer for the Haute-Savoie Chamber of Commerce and Industry, helping young entrepreneurs to take over and manage businesses in the Haute-Savoie region.
