= Seine-Saint-Denis's 2nd constituency =

Constituency of the National Assembly of France

2nd constituency of Seine-Saint-Denis
- inline Constituency of the National Assembly of France

- Deputy: Stéphane Peu; PCF
- Department: Seine-Saint-Denis
- Registered voters: 54,143

The 2nd constituency of Seine-Saint-Denis (French: Deuxième circonscription de la Seine-Saint-Denis) is one of the 12 legislative constituencies in Seine-Saint-Denis (93) département, France. Like the other 576 French constituencies, it elects one MP using the two-round system.

== Deputies ==
Election	Member	Party	Source
1988	Marcelin Berthelot	PCF	
1993	Patrick Braouezec	PCF	
1997	Patrick Braouezec	PCF	
2002	Patrick Braouezec	PCF	
2007	Patrick Braouezec	PCF	
2012	Mathieu Hanotin	PS	
2017	Stéphane Peu	PCF/LFI	
2022	Stéphane Peu	PCF	
2024	Stéphane Peu	PCF	

== Election results ==
=== 2024 ===
Candidate	Party	Alliance	First round			Second round		
Candidate	Party	Alliance	Votes	%	+/–	Votes	%	+/–
Stéphane Peu	PCF	NFP	22,055	71.80	+8.95			
Luc Colomas	RN		3,628	11.81	+3.42			
Samantha Uk	MoDem	ENS	2,282	7.43	-1.62			
Anasse Kazib	EXG		1,128	3.67	N/A			
Louis-Auxile Maillard	LR		798	2.60	-0.93			
Agnès Renaud	LO		491	1.60	-0.08			
Maki Théa Marquand	DVE		334	1.09	N/A			
Valid votes			30,716	97.74	+0.21			
Blank votes			453	1.44	-0.33			
Null votes			257	0.82	+0.12			
Turnout			31,426	55.25	+22.46			
Abstentions			25,456	44.75	-22.46			
Registered voters			56,882					
Source: Ministry of the Interior, Le Monde
Result						PCF HOLD		

=== 2022 ===
Candidate	Party	Alliance	First round			Second round		
Candidate	Party	Alliance	Votes	%	+/–	Votes	%	+/–
Stéphane Peu	PCF	NUPÉS	11,083	62.85	+11.91	13,180	78.70	+20.81
Anaïs Brood	MoDem	ENS	1,595	9.05	-11.64	3,567	21.30	-20.81
Luc Colomas	RN		1,480	8.39	+0.50			
Bakary Soukouna	DVG		1,189	6.74	N/A			
Sinaa Thabet	LR	UDC	622	3.53	-3.25			
Brahim Chikhi	DVC		619	3.51	N/A			
Aurélia Bardy	REC		375	2.13	N/A			
Agnès Renaud	LO		297	1.68	+0.40			
Aurélien Pichard	PA		222	1.26	N/A			
Jean-Christophe Brossard	EXG		151	0.86	N/A			
Christelle Vétil	UDI	UDC	0	0.00	±0.00			
Valid votes			17,633	97.53		16,747	95.49	
Blank votes			320	1.77		549	3.13	
Null votes			127	0.70		242	1.38	
Turnout			18,080	32.79		17,358	31.80	
Abstentions			37,065	67.21		37,614	68.20	
Registered voters			55,145			55,152		
Source: Ministry of the Interior, Le Monde
Result						PCF GAIN FROM LFI		

=== 2017 ===
Candidate	Party	Alliance	First round			Second round		
Candidate	Party	Alliance	Votes	%	+/–	Votes	%	+/–
Stéphane Peu	LFI		4,785	27.69	N/A	8,501	57.89	N/A
Véronique Avril	LREM	MP	3,575	20.69	N/A	6,183	42.11	N/A
Mathieu Hanotin	PS		3,323	19.23	-17.28			
Estelle Arnal	FN		1,363	7.89	-1.57			
Hayette Hamidi	LR	UDC	1,171	6.78	-2.34			
Laurent Servieres	EELV		694	4.02	+1.09			
Dieunor Excellent	DIV		598	3.46	-1.45			
Philippe Caro	DVG		339	1.96	N/A			
Mossaab Ouertatani	DIV		304	1.76	N/A			
Philippe Jullien	LO		222	1.28	+0.56			
Kamal El Mahouti	DVE		206	1.19	N/A			
Catherine Billard	NPA		199	1.15	-0.04			
Jérôme Sinpaseuth	DVG		195	1.13	N/A			
Martine Decius	DIV		163	0.94	N/A			
Bekhan Yahoulbaev	DLF		112	0.65	N/A			
Alicia Level	DIV		31	0.18	N/A			
Nadir Nini	DIV		0	0.00	N/A			
Abdel Hocini	DIV		0	0.00	N/A			
Vesna Scekic	UDI	UDC	0	0.00	N/A			
Valid votes			17,280	96.80	-1.52	14,684	91.86	-1.78
Blank votes			381	2.13	N/A	929	5.81	N/A
Null votes			190	1.06	N/A	372	2.33	N/A
Turnout			17,851	32.97	-11.41	15,985	29.52	-12.60
Abstentions			36,291	67.03	+11.41	38,158	70.48	+12.60
Registered voters			54,142			54,143		
Source: Ministry of the Interior
Result						LFI GAIN FROM PS		

=== 2012 ===
Candidate	Party	Alliance	First round			Second round		
Candidate	Party	Alliance	Votes	%	+/–	Votes	%	+/–
Mathieu Hanotin	PS	MP	8,080	36.51	+16.14	11,000	53.50	N/A
Patrick Braouezec	PCF	FG	6,897	31.17	-1.55	9,561	46.50	-18.50
Alain Polu	FN	RBM	2,094	9.46	+4.37			
Vijay Monany	UMP		2,018	9.12	-13.51			
Dieunor Excellent	DIV		1,086	4.91	N/A			
Dominique Carre	EELV	MP	649	2.93	-0.01			
Catherine Billard	NPA		263	1.19	-1.42			
Houari Guermat	NC		262	1.18	N/A			
Mohamed Amine Khouidrat	DVE		197	0.89	N/A			
Jean-Pierre Enjalbert	DVD		171	0.77	N/A			
Philippe Julien	LO		160	0.72	-0.15			
Françoise Marguerite-Barbeito	DVG		141	0.64	N/A			
Pierre Feuillette	DIV		109	0.49	N/A			
Véronique Landwerlin	DVD		1	0.00	N/A			
Valid votes			22,128	98.32	+0.26	20,561	93.64	-2.94
Blank and null votes			379	1.68	-0.26	1,396	6.36	+2.94
Turnout			22,507	43.48	-4.94	21,957	42.12	-3.96
Abstentions			29,260	56.52	+4.94	30,177	57.88	+3.96
Registered voters			51,767			52,134		
Source: Ministry of the Interior
Result						PS GAIN FROM PCF		

=== 2007 ===
Candidate	Party	Alliance	First round			Second round		
Candidate	Party	Alliance	Votes	%	+/–	Votes	%	+/–
Patrick Braouezec	PCF		7,774	32.72	-7.56	14,472	65.00	+1.68
Evelyne Nicol	UMP	MP	5,375	22.63	+4.40	7,794	35.00	-1.68
Rose Gomis	PS		4,839	20.37	+4.91			
Djamel Bouras	MoDem		2,274	9.57	N/A			
Alain Guyomard	FN		1,208	5.09	-9.37			
Cécile Rangin	LV		698	2.94	+0.25			
Catherine Billard	LCR		619	2.61	+1.04			
Huguette Brevini	EXD		230	0.97	N/A			
Philippe Julien	LO		206	0.87	-0.55			
Christophe Mezerette	DVG		156	0.66	N/A			
Nouredine Saadi	DIV		107	0.45	N/A			
Lionel Gimont	EXG		95	0.40	N/A			
Claudine Chevreau	PT		90	0.38	-0.20			
Smaïn Bedrouni	DIV		85	0.36	N/A			
Sandra Iemouli	DIV		0	0.00	N/A			
Valid votes			23,756	98.06	-0.18	22,266	96.58	+0.32
Blank and null votes			470	1.94	+0.18	788	3.42	-0.32
Turnout			24,226	48.42	-6.88	23,054	46.08	-2.17
Abstentions			25,803	51.58	+6.88	26,974	53.92	+2.17
Registered voters			50,029			50,028		
Source: Ministry of the Interior
Result						PCF HOLD		

=== 2002 ===
Candidate	Party	Alliance	First round			Second round		
Candidate	Party	Alliance	Votes	%	+/–	Votes	%	+/–
Patrick Braouezec	PCF		9,753	40.28	+5.49	13,107	63.32	-6.33
Evelyne Nicol	UMP	UPMP	4,414	18.23	+6.52	7,592	36.68	N/A
Stéphane Prive	PS		3,744	15.46	+0.56			
Alain Guyomard	FN		3,500	14.46	-8.16			
Dominique Carre	LV		652	2.69	-3.28			
Essaïd Zemouri	PR		447	1.85	N/A			
Catherine Billard	LCR		381	1.57	-1.01			
Philippe Julien	LO		345	1.42	-1.41			
Jacqueline Jorba y Campo	MNR		306	1.26	N/A			
Françoise Marikian	RPF		198	0.82	N/A			
Robert Cioffi	GE		185	0.76	+0.76			
Claudine Chevreau	PT		140	0.58	-0.24			
Sylvie Delsart	EXG		99	0.41	N/A			
Esther Munoz	DIV		47	0.19	N/A			
Philippe Borderie	UDF diss.		0	0.00	N/A			
Valid votes			24,211	98.24	+1.32	20,699	96.26	+3.73
Blank and null votes			434	1.76	-1.32	804	3.74	-3.73
Turnout			24,645	55.30	-4.52	21,503	48.25	-12.34
Abstentions			19,923	44.70	+4.52	23,065	51.75	+12.34
Registered voters			44,568			44,568		
Source: Ministry of the Interior
Result						PCF HOLD		

=== 1997 ===
Candidate	Party	Alliance	First round			Second round		
Candidate	Party	Alliance	Votes	%	+/–	Votes	%	+/–
Patrick Braouezec	PCF	GP	9,654	34.79	+5.70	18,691	69.65	+7.83
Pierre Pauty	FN		6,278	22.62	+0.16	8,145	30.35	-7.83
Georges Sali	PS	GP	4,134	14.90	+4.13			
Gérard Delattre	PR	UDF/Union	3,251	11.71	-8.37			
Michèle Zemor	LV	GP	1,656	5.97	N/A			
Idilio Valdenebro	LO		786	2.83	+1.15			
Alain Krivine	LCR		715	2.58	N/A			
Alain Attal	LDI		486	1.75	N/A			
Béatrice Arondel	DIV		248	0.89	N/A			
Pierre Deplanque	EXD		235	0.85	N/A			
Claudine Chevreau	PT		228	0.82	-0.20			
Denis Degé	DIV		82	0.30	N/A			
Eric Lefebvre	GE		0	0.00	-5.33			
Valid votes			27,753	96.92	+0.69	26,836	92.53	+0.52
Blank and null votes			883	3.08	-0.69	2,169	7.47	-0.52
Turnout			28,636	59.82	-1.96	29,005	60.59	-1.33
Abstentions			19,234	40.18	+1.96	18,865	39.41	+1.33
Registered voters			47,870			47,870		
Source: National Assembly
Result						PCF HOLD		

=== 1993 ===
Candidate	Party	Alliance	First round			Second round		
Candidate	Party	Alliance	Votes	%	+/–	Votes	%	+/–
Patrick Braouezec	PCF		8,359	29.09		17,022	61.82	
Franck Timmermans	FN		6,456	22.46		10,512	38.18	
Gerard Delattre	UDF	UPF	5,770	20.08				
Henri Weber	PS	ADFP	3,094	10.77				
Hayette Boudjemia	GE		1,532	5.33				
Marianne Mancini	NERNA		656	2.28				
Maurice Lombard	UED		571	1.99				
Idilio Valdenebro	LO		482	1.68				
Sylvie Delsart	SEGA		461	1.60				
Christian Bensimon	EXG		403	1.40				
Claudine Chevreau	PT		293	1.02				
Serge Lesein	EXD		238	0.83				
Ferdinand Bramoulle	CNIP	UPF	230	0.80				
Fodhil Hamoudi	DIV		194	0.68				
Valid votes			28,739	96.23		27,534	92.01	
Blank and null votes			1,125	3.77		2,392	7.99	
Turnout			29,864	61.78		29,926	61.92	
Abstentions			18,475	38.22		18,406	38.08	
Registered voters			48,339			48,332		
Source: Ministry of the Interior
Result						PCF HOLD		
