= Aurélie Trouvé =

French politician and activist (born 1979)

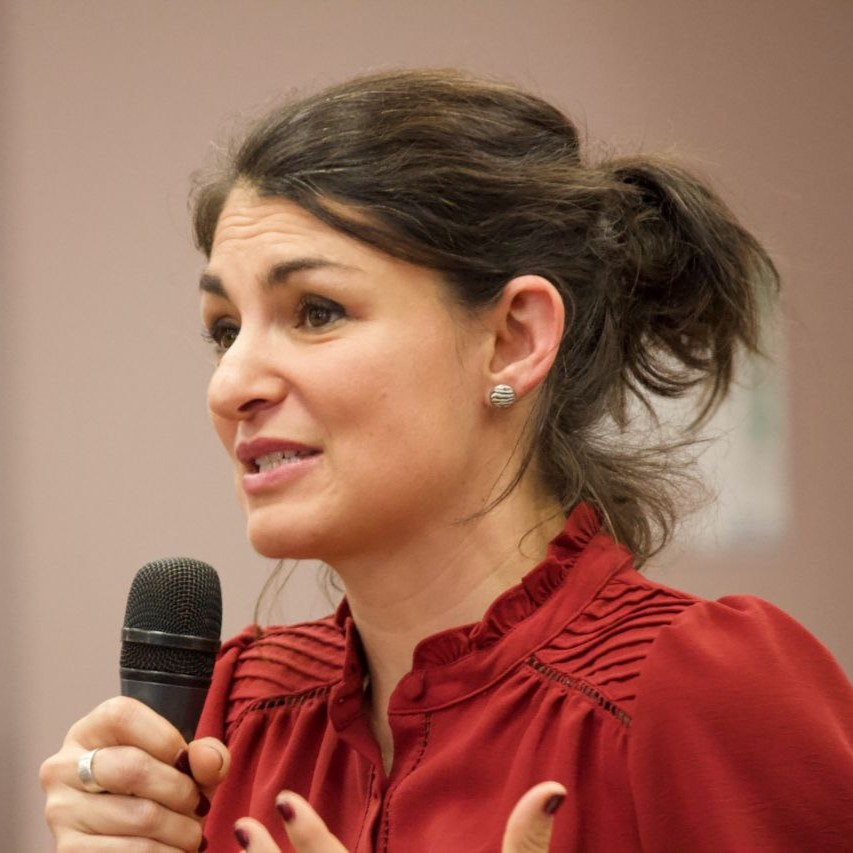
- Trouvé in 2022

Chairwoman of the Economic Affairs Committee of the National Assembly
- Incumbent
- Assumed office 9 October 2024
- Assembly: 17th
- Preceded by: Antoine Armand

Member of the National Assembly for Seine-Saint-Denis's 9th constituency
- In office 22 June 2022 – 9 June 2024
- Election: 19 June 2022; 30 June 2024
- Assembly: 16th and 17th
- Preceded by: Sabine Rubin
- Parliamentary group: LFI-NFP

Personal details
- Born: 20 September 1979 (age 47) Chauny, Aisne, France
- Party: La France Insoumise
- Education: École Nationale Supérieure Agronomique de Toulouse; Institut Agro Dijon; University of Burgundy
- Profession: Agricultural engineer Academic

Aurélie Trouvé (French pronunciation: [ɔʁeli tʁuve]; born 20 September 1979) is a French politician and alter-globalization activist. She was co-president of the Association for the Taxation of Financial Transactions and for Citizens' Action (Attac) from 2006 to 2012, then spokesperson for the association from 2016 to 2021.

Trouvé was the president of the “Parliament of the Popular Union” of the La France Insoumise party as part of Jean-Luc Mélenchon 's campaign in the 2022 French presidential election. She is an agricultural engineer by profession and graduated from the École Nationale Supérieure Agronomique de Toulouse (ENSAT) and a doctor in economics, she is a lecturer at AgroParisTech. She was elected a La France Insoumise Member of Parliament in the 2022 French legislative election for Seine-Saint-Denis's 9th constituency. She is the Chairwoman of the Economic Affairs Committee of the said Assembly since 9 Octobre 2024.

== Biography ==
Trouvé was born in Chauny in Picardy in 1979. Aurélie Trouvé grew up in Poulx (Gard) in a family politicized on the left which was linked to associative circles.

She came to alter-globalization through an economics professor, Jacques Berthelot, she joined Attac Campus in 2002. She also obtained an engineering diploma at the National School of Rural Engineering, Water Resources and Forestry in 2003.

In 2007, she completed a doctoral thesis in Economic Sciences at the University of Burgundy on European agricultural policies. She became a lecturer at Agrosup Dijon from 2007 to 2013, she travelled back and forth between Burgundy, Montreuil where she settled with her daughter and her partner, and Paris for her research activities. She has been a lecturer in economics at AgroParisTech since 2014 (UMR Prodig).

She is involved at the local level in the Attac 21 group, of which she became vice-president in 2005, and in the Attac Campus Dijon group from 2002. She also becomes a member of the Local Social Forum 21, and of the commission on Europe. At the end of 2006, she moved to Grenoble.

She was elected for the first time to the board of directors of Attac France in June 2006. After the cancellation of the first ballot, she was re-elected in December 2006, at the top of all the candidates. The Board appoints her co-president, with Jean-Marie Harribey. Then she was re-elected again in December 2009 and designated by the Board as co-president with Thomas Coutrot.

On 6 June 2011, she announced her candidacy (which was inadmissible due to not being presented by the French government) for the general management of the International Monetary Fund following the resignation of Dominique Strauss-Kahn.

Her work published by Fayard in 2015 was entitled, Le business est dans le pré, which appeared in very different publications, academic like the journal Revue Projet. It also appeared in media like Alternatives économiques and France Culture or activists like the website of the Confédération paysanne.

In 2016, she was appointed spokesperson for Attac. In 2020, during the confinement period, it presented an economic plan to emerge from the crisis of the COVID-19 pandemic prepared by Attac and a collective of anti-liberal associations. In 2021, she left Attac to lead a reflection on the re-composition of a radical left political force in France.

In December of the same year, as part of the campaign for the 2022 French presidential election, she joined the campaign of La France insoumise, supporting the candidacy of Jean-Luc Mélenchon and became president of the parliament of the Popular Union. As part of the 2022 French legislative elections, she was the NUPES candidate in Seine-Saint-Denis's 9th constituency to succeed Sabine Rubin, the outgoing MP for La France Insoumise who stood down. She was elected in the second round on 19 June 2022 with 69.24% of the votes cast, or 27.51% of those registered to vote.

On 30 June, she was elected secretary of the Economic Affairs Committee of the National Assembly, and on 9 October, chairwoman of the same Committee.

== Bibliography ==
- Le business est dans le pré, Paris, Éditions Fayard, coll. « Témoignages/Doc/Actu », 2015, 220 p. ISBN 978-2-213-67887-0
- Le Bloc arc-en-ciel : pour une stratégie politique radicale et inclusive, Paris, La Découverte, 2021, coll. « Petits cahiers libres », 168 p. ISBN 9782348068713

== See also ==
- List of deputies of the 16th National Assembly of France
