= Bally Bagayoko =

French politician (born 1973)

- Bagayoko in 2026

Mayor of Saint-Denis
- Incumbent
- Assumed office 21 March 2026
- Preceded by: Mathieu Hanotin

Saint-Denis City Councillor
- Incumbent
- Assumed office 21 March 2026
- In office 18 March 2001 – 4 July 2020

Personal details
- Born: 31 July 1973 (age 53) Levallois-Perret, France
- Party: LFI
- Other political affiliations: FG
- Education: Paris 8 University
- Website: Official website

Bally Bagayoko (French pronunciation: [bali bagajoko]; born 31 July 1973) is a French politician. A member of La France Insoumise (LFI), he was elected mayor of Saint-Denis in 2026.

He was first voted onto the city council in Saint-Denis in 2001, and was deputy mayor to Patrick Braouezec. He remained on the city council until he ran for mayor in 2020, coming third and being eliminated in the first round with 18% of the votes. In 2026, he was elected mayor, defeating Socialist incumbent Mathieu Hanotin in the first round of voting.

== Early and personal life ==
Bagayoko was born on 31 July 1973 in Levallois-Perret, in the department of Hauts-de-Seine. He grew up in Saint-Denis, and his family is of Malian origin. He is a Muslim. He earned a degree in geopolitics from Paris 8 University. He has four children.

Bagayoko played basketball to a semi-professional level, in the departmental and then regional leagues. He was the coach of Saint-Denis Union Sports, and took the club from the departmental league to the third national division.

== Political career ==
=== Early career ===
Bagayoko was first elected to the city council in Saint-Denis in 2001. He was deputy mayor to Patrick Braouezec. While Braouezec was a member of the French Communist Party (PCF), Bagayoko never joined the party. In 2008, he became vice president of the Regional Council of Île-de-France. He joined the Left Front (FG), established by Jean-Luc Mélenchon, in 2012. He remained on the city council of Saint-Denis for 19 years.

In 2020, Bagayoko ran for mayor of Saint-Denis, representing Mélenchon's La France Insoumise (LFI). He contested the election against incumbent PCF mayor Laurent Russier and Mathieu Hanotin of the Socialist Party (PS). He received 18.04% of the votes in the first round, finishing third of nine candidates and being eliminated. According to Bagayoko, the public believed that his political career would end with that result.

=== 2026 election ===
In the 2026 French municipal elections, Bagayoko was elected mayor of Saint-Denis, the second largest city in the Île-de-France region after Paris itself. He won in the first round, and was the only mayor of a city with over 150,000 inhabitants to not require a second round of voting. His proposals included the gradual disarming of the local police, starting by ending purchases of rubber bullets.

His opponent, incumbent Hanotin, said that drug dealers would approve of Bagayoko's plans for disarming the police. Bagayoko sued for defamation and his lawsuit was dismissed. A July 2026 investigation by France Info found that in December 2025, Bagayoko advocated on behalf of Ahmed Doumbia, a recidivist criminal whose nightclub had been closed by authorities. He referred to Doumbia as "family" while discussing with a council member. He told France Info that he regretted his association with Doumbia.

After his election, Bagayoko sued the news channel CNews for guests describing Bagayoko as an ape and tribal. The channel said the statements were taken out of context. Prosecutors announced an investigation into alleged hate speech, as well as a separate investigation into alleged cyberbullying against Bagayoko. He was also targeted over an online video which purported that he called Saint-Denis "la ville des noirs" (the city of blacks) when he said "la ville des rois" (the city of kings), referring to the French kings buried in the Basilica of Saint-Denis.

=== Mayoral term ===
A few months after his election, despite a number pundits claiming he would not, Bagayoko began delivering on his campaign promise to give free bicycles to any 15 year old child. A first batch of 1000 bikes were distributed to middle school students in September 2026.

Bagayoko removed the portrait of president Emmanuel Macron from the mayor's office, and refused demands from the prefect to restore it. Displaying the portrait of the president is a tradition in France, but not a legal requirement.

Ahead of a visit by Pope Leo XIV, Bagayoko said that Christianity is part of a heritage shared by all French citizens, including Muslims like himself. He highlighted his city's basilica, where most of France's kings were buried. He has publicly opposed France's 2004 law prohibiting religious clothing in schools, believing it to be an attack on fundamental rights and the Muslim community, and has opposed sporting federations banning the hijab.

During the 2026 French student protests, Bagayoko said that, in response to police use of rubber-bullets with less-lethal launchers, protestors' "violence, at a certain moment, can be legitimate, but it is best whenever it can be avoided". He further explained that "they [the protestors] are young people, not adults, they can make mistakes" but that his responsibility was to avoid "violence as much as possible". He danced with protesters who were forming a blockade around their school in Saint-Denis. Patrice Faure, the prefect of Paris Police, referred the statement to prosecutors for alleged incitement to criminal activity. Bagayoko defended his statement and said that it was not incitement, and defended his presence around the protests, saying "that's where an elected official should be" and described the quoting as truncated. Images of Bagayoko attempting to put out a burning bin circulated widely online. Certain media such as Europe 1 shared a shortened video, based on which certain right and far-right politicians (e.g; Laurent Wauquiez, Bruno Retailleau, and Jean-Philippe Tanguy) accused him of setting it on fire instead. Bagayoko responded that these accusations were "grotesque" and that he had put it out as any elected official would have done, his version was confirmed by a number of sources. Videos of Bagayoko standing alongside and shielding students as police fired tear gas at them went viral. Bagayoko stood between the police and students and called for de-escalation, and was greeted with chants from protesters for him to be the president. In regards to the protests, Bagayoko said that the government needed to invest in education and to tax billionaires.
