= Bernard Bosson =

French politician and lawyer

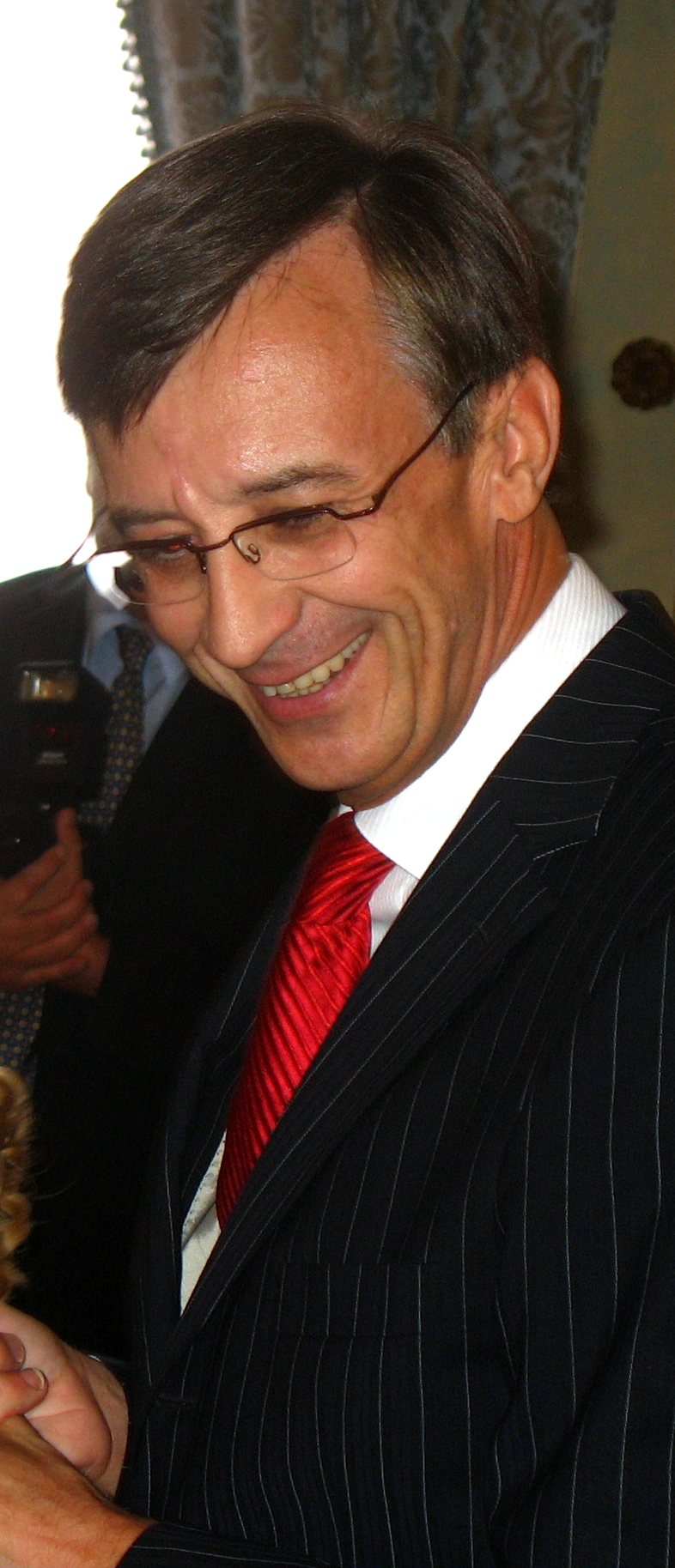

Minister of Transport
- In office 1993–1995
- President: François Mitterrand
- Prime Minister: Édouard Balladur
- Preceded by: Jean-Louis Bianco
- Succeeded by: Bernard Pons

Minister of European Affairs
- In office 1986–1988
- President: François Mitterrand
- Prime Minister: Jacques Chirac
- Preceded by: Catherine Lalumière
- Succeeded by: Édith Cresson

Mayor of Annecy
- In office 1983–2007
- Preceded by: André Fumex
- Succeeded by: Jean-Luc Rigaut

Member of the National Assembly for Haute-Savoie's 2nd constituency
- In office 1995–2007
- Preceded by: Pierre Hérisson
- Succeeded by: Lionel Tardy

Personal details
- Born: 25 February 1948 Annecy, France
- Died: 13 May 2017 (aged 69) Lyon, France
- Party: UDF
- Profession: Lawyer

Bernard Bosson (25 February 1948 – 16 May 2017) was a French politician and lawyer. He served as Minister of Transport, Minister of Tourism, and Minister of Public Works under Prime Minister Édouard Balladur from 1993 to 1995. He was a member of the 12th French National Assembly, representing Haute-Savoie as a member of the Union for French Democracy. He was also the mayor of Annecy. Bosson died in hospital in Lyon, France on 16 May 2017.

== Early life ==
Bosson was born in Annecy, France to Charles Bosson, former mayor of Annecy, centrist deputy and senator.

He has degrees in labor law and public law.
