= Stéphane Peu =

French politician (born 1962)

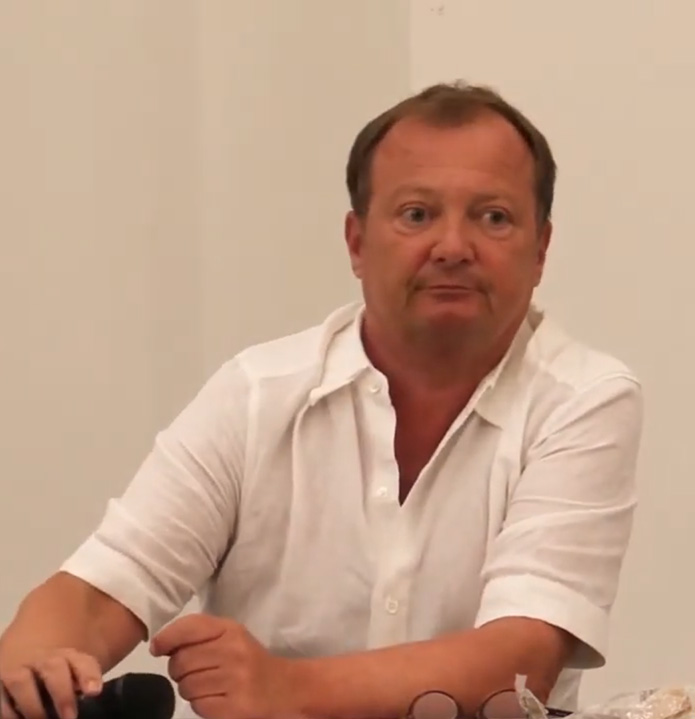
- Stéphane Peu in 2019

Co-President of the GDR Group
- Incumbent
- Assumed office 1 April 2025 Serving with Émeline K/Bidi
- Preceded by: André Chassaigne

Member of the National Assembly for Seine-Saint-Denis's 2nd constituency
- Incumbent
- Assumed office 21 June 2017
- Preceded by: Mathieu Hanotin

Deputy Mayor of Saint-Denis
- In office 1995 – 29 June 2017

Personal details
- Born: 24 July 1962 (age 63) Pau, France
- Party: French Communist Party
- Profession: Housing official, politician
- Website: www.stephanepeu.fr

Stéphane Peu (French pronunciation: [stefan pø]; born 24 July 1962) is a French politician who has served as a member of the National Assembly for Seine-Saint-Denis's 2nd constituency since 2017. A member of the French Communist Party (PCF), he became co-president of the Gauche démocrate et républicaine (GDR) parliamentary group on 1 April 2025, alongside Émeline K/Bidi, succeeding André Chassaigne. Before his parliamentary career, Peu served as deputy mayor of Saint-Denis and president of Plaine Commune Habitat, a public housing office managing approximately 20,000 social housing units.

== Early life and activism ==
Born in Pau to a working-class family – his father was a manual labourer and his mother a cleaning woman – Peu became politically active during his lycée years in Rennes, joining the Jeunesses Communistes (Communist Youth).

After completing military service, Peu moved to Paris and joined the national leadership of the Mouvement des Jeunes Communistes de France (MJCF). He became coordinator of the anti-apartheid movement in France, organising mobilisations demanding the release of Nelson Mandela. During this period, he worked closely with Dulcie September, the African National Congress representative in France who was assassinated in Paris in 1988. He also organised solidarity work camps in Nicaragua, coordinating approximately 120 young French volunteers.

== Municipal career ==
Peu was first elected to the Saint-Denis municipal council in 1995 on the PCF list. He rose to deputy mayor with responsibility for urban planning (urbanisme), serving under successive communist mayors.

At the intercommunal level, he served as vice-president of Plaine Commune, the territorial council grouping nine municipalities in northern Seine-Saint-Denis, with delegation for housing and land policy.

His most significant achievement was the creation of Plaine Commune Habitat in 2005, merging the public housing offices of Pierrefitte-sur-Seine, Saint-Denis, and La Courneuve with two mixed-economy companies to form a single entity managing 18,000 to 20,000 housing units. He served as president of its board from February 2008 until June 2017.

In accordance with France's conflict of interest laws, Peu resigned from all executive local mandates within days of his election to the National Assembly in June 2017.

== National Assembly career ==
=== First term (2017–2022) ===
Peu was elected to the National Assembly on 18 June 2017 in the second round, defeating Véronique Avril of La République En Marche! with 57.89% of votes cast. He ran under a joint PCF–La France Insoumise candidacy, marking the return of the PCF to a constituency the party had held continuously until losing it to Socialist Mathieu Hanotin in 2012.

He sat in the Gauche démocrate et républicaine (GDR) group and was assigned to the Commission des Lois (Committee on Constitutional Laws).

=== Second term (2022–2024) ===
Re-elected in June 2022 under the NUPES banner, Peu won 62.85% in the first round and 78.70% in the second round against Anaïs Brood (Ensemble).

He was appointed president of the parliamentary mission on access to decent housing and served as rapporteur of the follow-up mission evaluating State action in Seine-Saint-Denis. He was a member of the commission of inquiry into the Uber Files revelations.

=== Third term (2024–present) ===
In the snap elections of June–July 2024, Peu won re-election in the first round on 30 June with 22,055 votes (71.80%) under the New Popular Front label.

On 1 April 2025, Peu was elected co-president of the GDR group alongside Émeline K/Bidi, succeeding André Chassaigne.

== Political positions ==
=== Housing policy ===
Housing is Peu's signature legislative issue. He has served as the PCF's national housing policy chief since 2012 and is vice-president of the Fédération nationale des Offices Publics de l'Habitat.

His legislative work centres on massive social housing construction, combating slumlords, and making homeownership accessible to working-class families. In December 2022, he proposed legislation to guarantee access to housing and preserve household purchasing power.

=== Seine-Saint-Denis equality ===
Peu has been a vocal advocate for territorial equality in Seine-Saint-Denis, France's poorest department. In 2018, he participated in a cross-party parliamentary report titled "La République en échec" (The Republic in Failure), which concluded that the State systematically discriminated against the department in allocating resources.

As co-rapporteur of a follow-up mission in November 2023, he found "no notable evolution" despite government promises.

=== Other positions ===
Peu voted against the 2023 immigration law and has advocated for regularisation of undocumented workers. He broke from his parliamentary group by voting against assisted dying legislation in May 2025, stating: "I think the first victims of this law will be the poor and the vulnerable."

== Party politics ==
Peu belongs to the "refondateur" (reformist) tendency within the PCF, which favours broad left-wing alliances. This has placed him in internal opposition to national secretary Fabien Roussel's leadership.

At the PCF's 38th Congress in 2018, Peu co-led an alternative text titled "Se réinventer ou disparaître!" which received 11.95% of the militant vote. At the 39th Congress in Marseille in April 2023, he co-signed "Urgence de communisme" alongside former national secretaries Pierre Laurent and Marie-George Buffet, which received 18.08%.

== Personal life ==
Peu has lived in Saint-Denis since the mid-1980s. He has one daughter who completed her education in Saint-Denis public schools. He received the Legion of Honour on 14 July 2012.

== Electoral history ==
| Year | Election | Round | Votes | % | Result |
|---|---|---|---|---|---|
| 2017 | Legislative | 2nd | 8,501 | 57.89% | Elected |
| 2022 | Legislative | 2nd | 13,180 | 78.70% | Re-elected |
| 2024 | Legislative | 1st | 22,055 | 71.80% | Elected |

== See also ==
- List of deputies of the 15th National Assembly of France
- List of deputies of the 16th National Assembly of France
- List of deputies of the 17th National Assembly of France
