= Sabine Rubin =

French politician (born 1960)

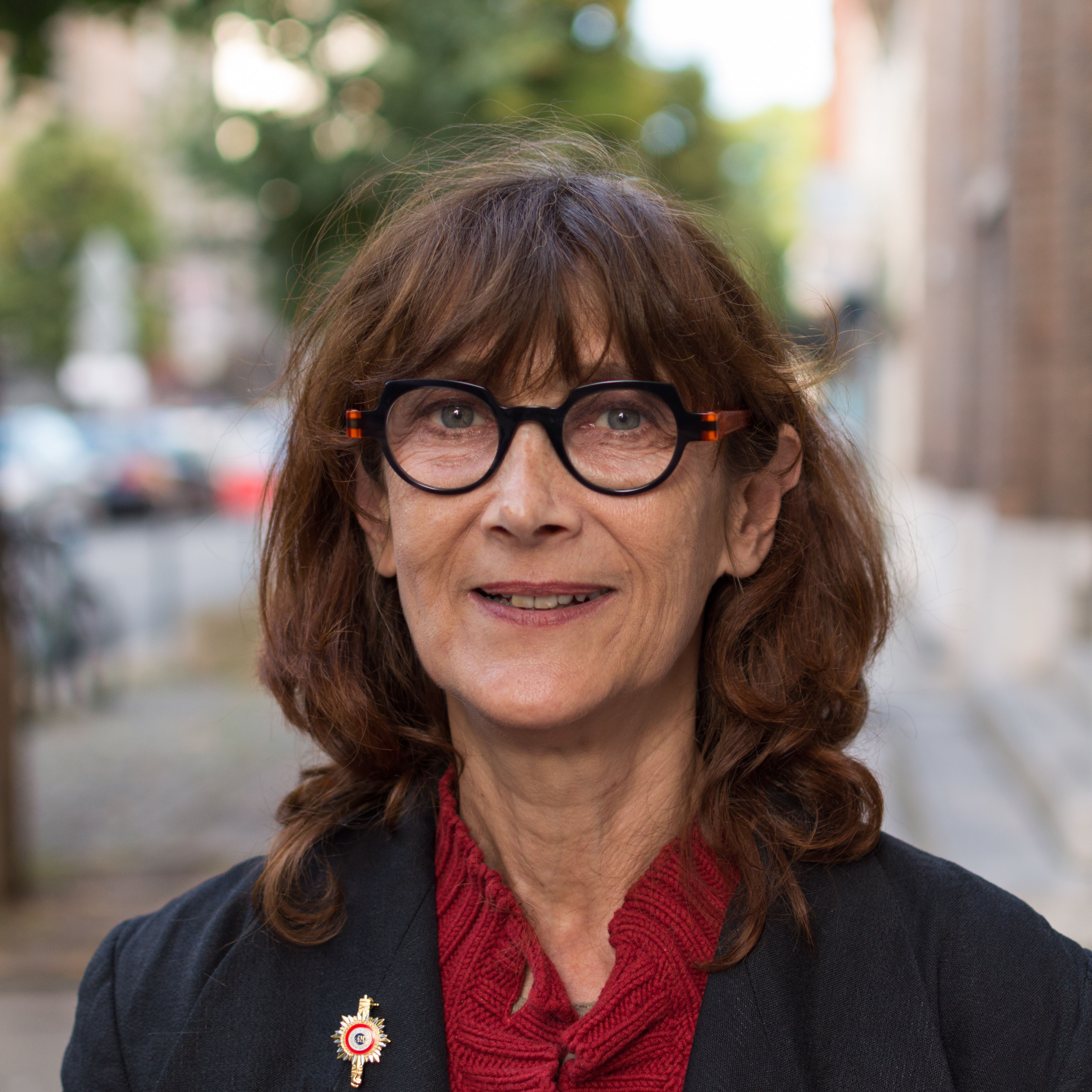
- Sabine Rubin in 2017

Member of the National Assembly for Seine-Saint-Denis's 9th constituency
- In office 18 June 2017 – 22 June 2022
- Preceded by: Claude Bartolone
- Succeeded by: Aurélie Trouvé

Personal details
- Born: 13 August 1960 (age 66) Paris, France
- Party: La France Insoumise

Sabine Rubin (born 13 August 1960) is a French politician from la France Insoumise. She was elected to the French National Assembly in the 2017 French legislative election, becoming the Member of Parliament for the 9th constituency of the department of Seine-Saint-Denis.

== See also ==
- List of deputies of the 15th National Assembly of France
