= Frédérique Lardet =

French politician

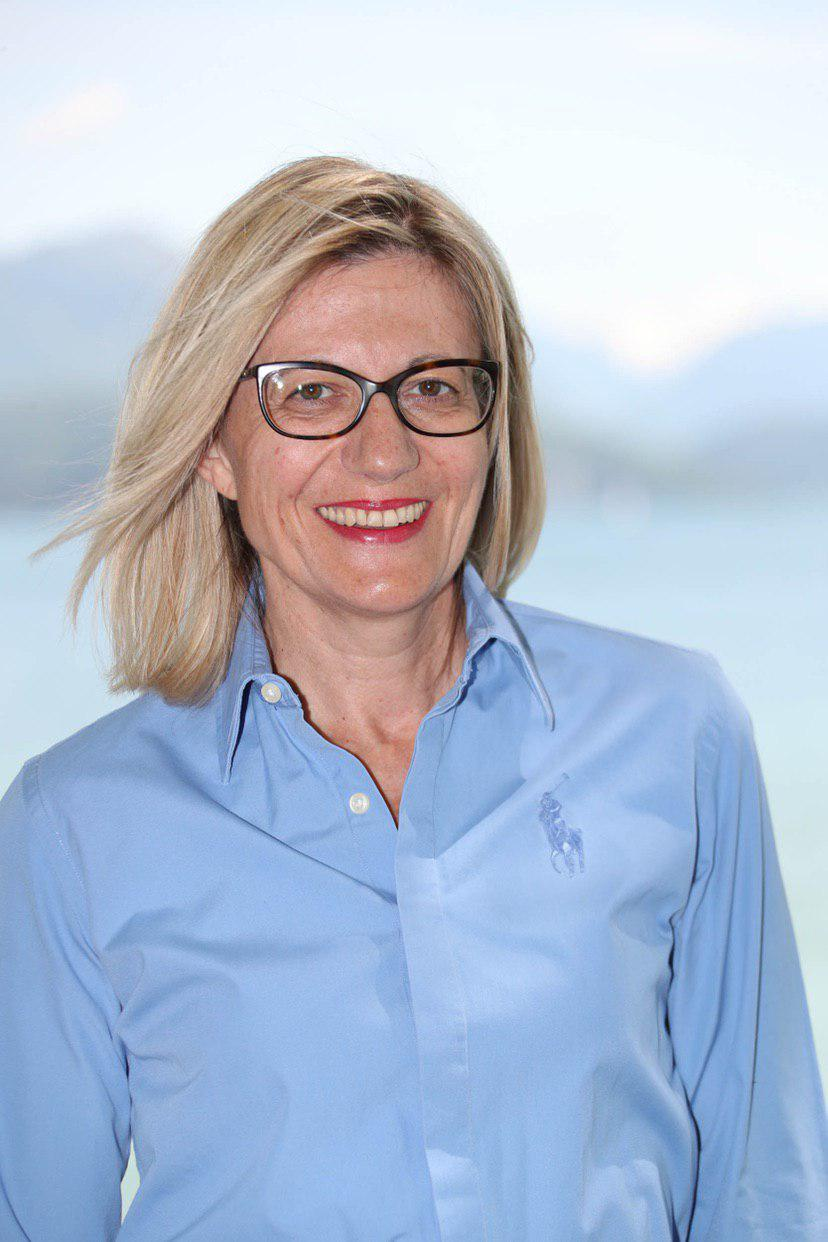

Member of the National Assembly for Haute-Savoie's 2nd constituency
- In office 21 June 2017 – 29 January 2022
- Preceded by: Lionel Tardy
- Succeeded by: Jacques Rey

Personal details
- Born: 1 September 1966 (age 60) Annecy
- Party: La République En Marche!
- Education: ESSEC Business School

Frédérique Lardet (born 1 September 1966) is a French politician of La République En Marche! (LREM) who has been serving as a member of the French National Assembly since the 2017 elections, representing the department of Haute-Savoie.

== Early career ==
Lardet was a vice president with international hotel chain Accor.

== Political career ==
Ahead of the 2017 elections, Lardet quit her job to join Emmanuel Macron's En Marche! movement.

In parliament, Lardet serves as member of the Committee on Economic Affairs. In addition to her committee assignments, she is a member of the French-Swiss Parliamentary Friendship Group.

In July 2019, Lardet decided not to align with her parliamentary group's majority and became one of 52 LREM members who abstained from a vote on the French ratification of the European Union's Comprehensive Economic and Trade Agreement (CETA) with Canada.

In late 2019, Lardet announced she was prepared if necessary to go against the party's wishes to mount a bid for the post of mayor in Annecy in the 2020 elections.

She resigns from the National Assembly on January 29, 2022.

== See also ==
- 2017 French legislative election
