= Jacques Rey =

French politician

Jacques Rey (born 17 October 1942) is a French politician of La République En Marche! (LREM). He was on the council in Sevrier, Haute-Savoie from 1977 to 2019, serving as mayor from 2008. Aged 79, he was a deputy in the National Assembly for Haute-Savoie's 2nd constituency from January to June 2022.

== Biography ==
Born in Sevrier, Haute-Savoie, he was first elected to his hometown's council in 1977. He became deputy mayor in 1989, serving behind Pierre Hérisson. In 2008, when Hérisson ended his 31-year tenure to run for mayor of the departmental seat Annecy, Rey was elected mayor ahead of Hérisson's preferred candidate Isabelle Payen. He was also a delegate to the Communauté d'agglomération du Grand Annecy in the area of water management.

In 2019, Rey announced that he would not run for reelection the following year. He was succeeded in May by his former assistant for town planning, Bruno Lyonnaz. In January 2022, the 79-year-old entered national politics for the first time when he succeeded Frédérique Lardet as deputy in the National Assembly for Haute-Savoie's 2nd constituency; she had left to become president of Grand Annecy. In June's elections, he did not stand, with LREM instead represented by Antoine Armand.
