= Chapuis =

Chapuis is a French-language surname of the Arpitan region of eastern France and Francophone Switzerland with various spellings. Notable people with the surname include:

- Auguste Chapuis (1858–1933), French composer, organist, and professor
- Bernard Chapuis (born 1945), French writer
- Charles Bertin Gaston Chapuis de Tourville (1740–1809), French general
- Cyril Chapuis (born 1979), French footballer
- Félicien Chapuis (1824–1879), Belgian doctor and entomologist
- Jean-Frédéric Chapuis (born 1989), French skier
- Jean-Joseph Chapuis (1765–1864), French cabinetmaker
- Johann Chapuis (born 1975), French footballer
- Michel Chapuis (organist) (1930–2017), French organist
- Michel Chapuis (sprint canoer) (born 1941), French canoeist
- Olivier Chapuis (born 1975), French ice dancer
- René-Bernard Chapuy (1746–1809, known as Chapuis), French soldier and general
- Simone Chapuis-Bischof, (born 1931), Swiss women's rights activist

== See also ==
- Chappuis (disambiguation)
- Eustace Chapuys, Imperial ambassador to England from 1529 until 1545
