= Florian Bercault =

French politician (born 1990)

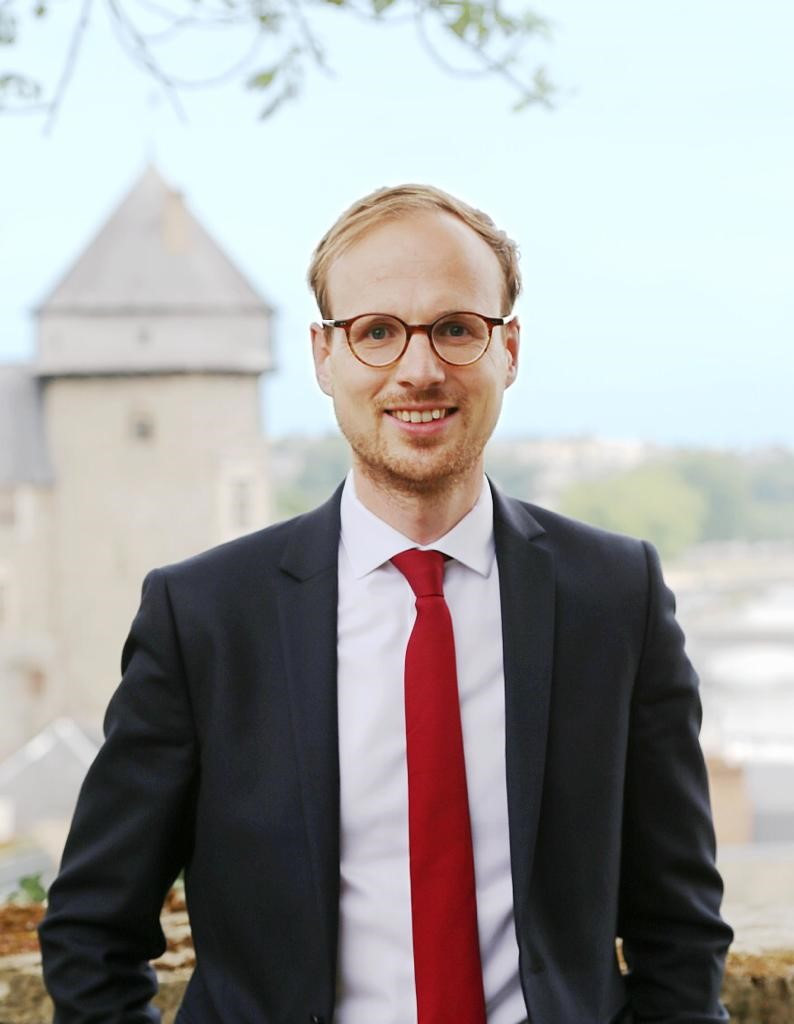
- Bercault in 2021

Mayor of Laval
- Incumbent
- Assumed office 3 July 2020
- Preceded by: François Zocchetto

Personal details
- Born: 10 May 1990 (age 36)
- Party: Independent
- Education: Sciences Po; HEC Paris

Florian Bercault (born 10 May 1990) is a French politician serving as mayor of Laval since 2020. He concurrently serves as president of Laval Agglomération since 2020. He studied in Guadalajara, Mexico, in 2006 and graduated from Sciences Po and HEC Paris. He is the CEO of a startup valuation company and a part-time contributor for Forbes.
