= Mathieu Hanotin =

French politician (born 1978)

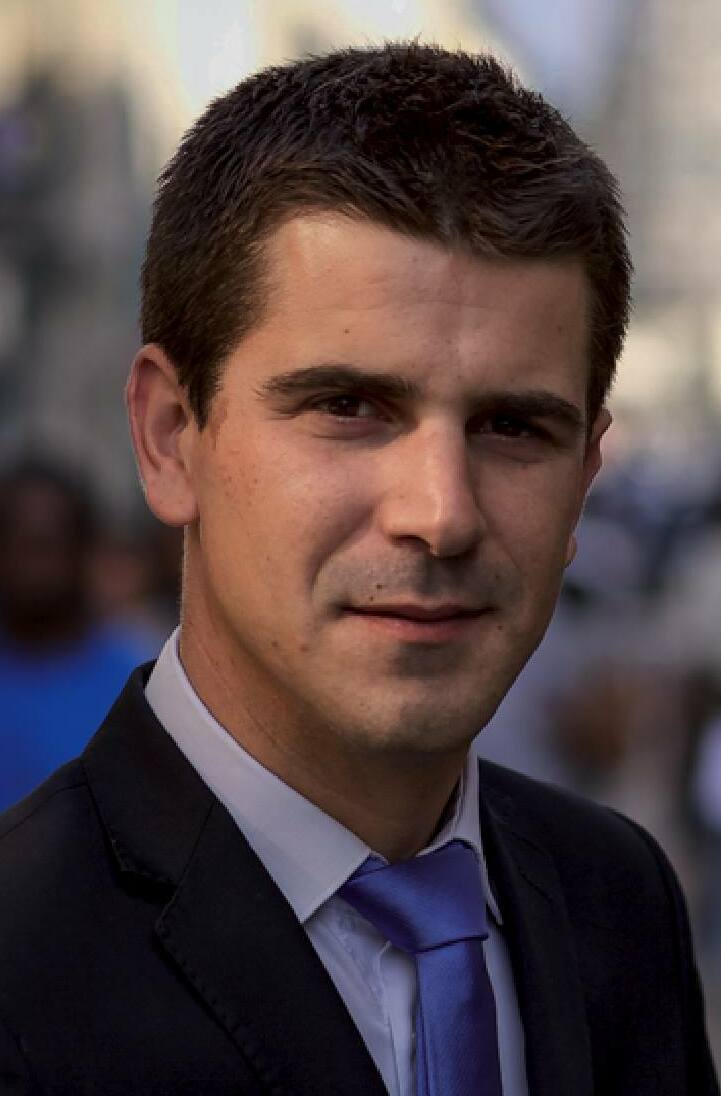
- Mathieu Hanotin in 2014

Mayor of Saint-Denis
- In office 4 July 2020 – 21 March 2026
- Preceded by: Laurent Russier
- Succeeded by: Bally Bagayoko

Member of the National Assembly for Seine-Saint-Denis's 2nd constituency
- In office 20 June 2012 – 20 June 2017
- Preceded by: Patrick Braouezec
- Succeeded by: Stéphane Peu

Personal details
- Born: 22 August 1978 (age 48) Compiègne, France
- Party: Socialist Party
- Education: University of Strasbourg; Paris 1 Panthéon-Sorbonne University

Mathieu Hanotin (French pronunciation: [matjø anɔtɛ̃]; born 22 August 1978) is a French politician of the Socialist Party. From 2020 to 2026, he served as mayor of Saint-Denis. From 2012 to 2017, he was a member of the National Assembly for Seine-Saint-Denis's 2nd constituency. From 2008 to 2021, he was a member of the Departmental Council of Seine-Saint-Denis.

== Biography ==
Hanotin began his political activism in the student union UNEF while studying law and history at the University of Strasbourg and later at Paris 1 Panthéon-Sorbonne. He joined the Socialist Party in 1996. He later worked as a senior official at Paris city hall alongside deputy mayor for sports Pascal Cherki.

== Political career ==
=== Department ===
Hanotin moved to Seine-Saint-Denis around 2005. He stood for election and was elected in March 2008 as general councillor for the canton of Saint-Denis-Sud, defeating the incumbent communist Ronan Kerrest. The canton had been regarded as difficult for challengers.

When Claude Bartolone became president of the departmental council of Seine-Saint-Denis, he appointed the council's youngest member with leading priority areas as vice-president in charge of education, citizenship and the fight against discrimination. In 2011 his vice-presidency was extended to education and youth. In 2010 the department adopted an exceptional investment plan totalling €703 million for construction or reconstruction of 21 collèges, including €380 million in direct project management and €323 million in public private partnership contracts.

He stood in the 2015 departmental elections in tandem with Nadège Grosbois and led in the first round over the ticket formed by outgoing Front de gauche councillors Bally Bagayoko and Florence Haye; Patrick Braouezec was the substitute on that ticket. After an internal agreement among left wing candidates, he remained the left’s candidate for the second round.

As departmental councillor in charge of sport and major events he oversaw adoption in November 2016 of an investment programme for swimming pools, including a new facility planned for Pierrefitte-sur-Seine, and he was responsible for the departmental project in Paris’s bid for the 2024 Olympic Games, which included an Olympic pool near the Stade de France and reconstruction of Piscine Annette-Kellermann (Marville pool).

Accused of not supporting the list led by Gilbert Roger in the 2017 Senate elections, the federation adopted in October 2017 a motion asking him to resign as president of the Socialist group at the departmental council. He resigned in November 2017, stating that his delegation for sport and organisation of major events like the 2024 Olympics required much of his time.

=== Deputy ===
After supporting Martine Aubry in the 2011 primary, Hanotin backed the successful presidential campaign of François Hollande. He stood in the June 2012 legislative elections and was elected deputy for the 2nd constituency of Seine-Saint-Denis (Saint-Denis, Pierrefitte-sur-Seine, Villetaneuse), defeating incumbent and Front de Gauche candidate Patrick Braouezec. His election night was marked by disturbances among supporters of the outgoing candidate at the Saint-Denis reception hall when results were announced.

A member of the Commission des Affaires culturelles et de l'Éducation Committee on Cultural and Education Affairs, he focused on education and housing issues relevant to suburban residents. As part of the ALUR housing bill, he had several amendments adopted aimed at combating substandard housing. The implementing decree defining where mayors may require a "permis de louer" was issued in December 2016.

He sponsored amendments to the school reform project concerning priority education and the transition from primary school to collège. He supported the Saint-Denis hospital centre as headquarters of the territorial hospital group linking it to Gonesse hospital and helped finance the Maison des femmes at Delafontaine hospital, opened in 2016.

Recalling a Hollande campaign commitment to improve police–public relations, he tabled in 2016 an amendment to require officers to issue receipts during identity checks to combat discriminatory checks; the amendment was rejected. In November 2016 the French Court of Cassation condemned the State over discriminatory identity checks.

During the Digital Republic bill examination he secured in January 2016 an amendment guaranteeing the right to maintain an internet connection for households in difficulty; the experiment began in two departments in January 2017.

A member of the left current Un monde d'avance founded by Benoît Hamon, he abstained on 15 October 2013 on the pension reform presented by the Ayrault government alongside other left-wing MPs who expressed serious reservations about lengthening contribution periods.

After Manuel Valls's budget announcements in April 2014, he co-signed a letter with Christian Paul and others arguing that the government savings plan should not exceed €35 billion rather than the €50 billion proposed. With about forty other Socialist deputies he abstained from the vote on 29 April 2014 following the Government’s declaration on the stability programme for 2014–2017, an act associated with the "frondeurs". He opposed the presidential project to enshrine stripping of nationality in the Constitution.

He was among left-wing parliamentarians who in autumn 2012 urged President Hollande to implement voting rights for resident non-citizens in local elections; he co-signed an amendment that was rejected in session which would have legalised that right within the 2016 constitutional reform project.

He served as campaign director for Benoît Hamon in the 2017 Socialist primary and subsequently co-directed Hamon’s presidential campaign with deputy Jean-Marc Germain.

At the launch rally for Hamon’s candidacy in Saint-Denis, Hanotin criticised the left’s record during the five-year term and accused Manuel Valls of supporting identitarian-leaning mayors in reference to anti-burkini decrees. Hamon won the first round of the primary with 36% of the vote.

Hamon obtained 6.35% of the vote in the 2017 presidential election and did not qualify for the second round; Hanotin published a 20-part series in Libération in the autumn about the campaign.

He joined the project to launch the movement "Dès demain" revealed on 10 May 2017 by Anne Hidalgo, Martine Aubry and Christiane Taubira. He announced on 10 May 2017 that he would not give confidence to the government appointed by Emmanuel Macron, but narrowly failed to qualify for the second round of the 2017 legislative elections and thus lost his seat.

He supported the launch of Benoît Hamon’s movement Génération.s but remained a member of the Socialist Party. In the 2017 legislative election he received 19.2% of the vote in his constituency and was eliminated in the first round; the seat was won by communist Stéphane Peu in the second round.

=== Municipal and inter-municipal ===
In August 2013 he announced his candidacy for mayor of Saint-Denis in the 2014 municipal elections. He obtained 34.3% in the first round against incumbent communist mayor Didier Paillard (40.2%), and was narrowly defeated in the second round with 49.50% of the vote. The following month he chose to retain his seat as general councillor and to resign his municipal councillor mandate to allow the next candidate on his list to take the seat.

From February 2016 the city of Saint-Denis began publishing a journal evaluating the fulfilment of its electoral commitments; shortly afterwards the Socialist party distributed a questionnaire to residents to assess the municipal record.

In May 2018 he publicly launched the "Notre Saint-Denis" initiative in preparation for the 2020 municipal elections. In the first round of the 2020 municipal elections on 15 March 2020 he received 35.3% of the vote; incumbent communist mayor Laurent Russier obtained 24%. Hanotin won the second round on 28 June with 59% and was inaugurated as mayor on 4 July 2020, becoming the first Socialist mayor of Saint-Denis after more than seventy years of Communist administrations.

Among his first measures in autumn 2020 were several in the field of public security: strengthening municipal police numbers and arming the force, creating an urban supervision centre and equipping agents, and renovating the former police station to relocate municipal police there while abandoning plans to install a music conservatory on that site. He prioritised the fight against substandard housing by strengthening hygiene inspectors and encouraging compulsory repair works.

His attempt to reform working conditions for municipal employees was contested by most unions and provoked a weeks-long social conflict in the city.

Following the 2020 municipal elections, Hanotin was also elected president of the Plaine Commune territorial public establishment. In September 2020, defending the choice of a public operator within SEDIF, he re-enrolled the nine municipalities of Plaine Commune with the Syndicat des eaux d'Île-de-France, a decision that six municipalities had previously put on hold.

Since his 2020 election Hanotin has invested heavily in video surveillance, increasing the number of cameras in the city to 450 at a total cost of €6.7 million. In 2024 he introduced an algorithmic video surveillance system using artificial intelligence to analyse behaviour in public spaces; the project was announced without prior public consultation or deliberation. The chosen software reportedly allows real-time monitoring and analysis of various behaviours via biometric filters, although their use is limited by French law.

== Awards and recognitions ==
=== Decorations ===
- Knight in the French Order of Merit: 2021
- Knight of the French Legion of Honour: 2025
