= Antoine Armand =

French politician (born 1991)

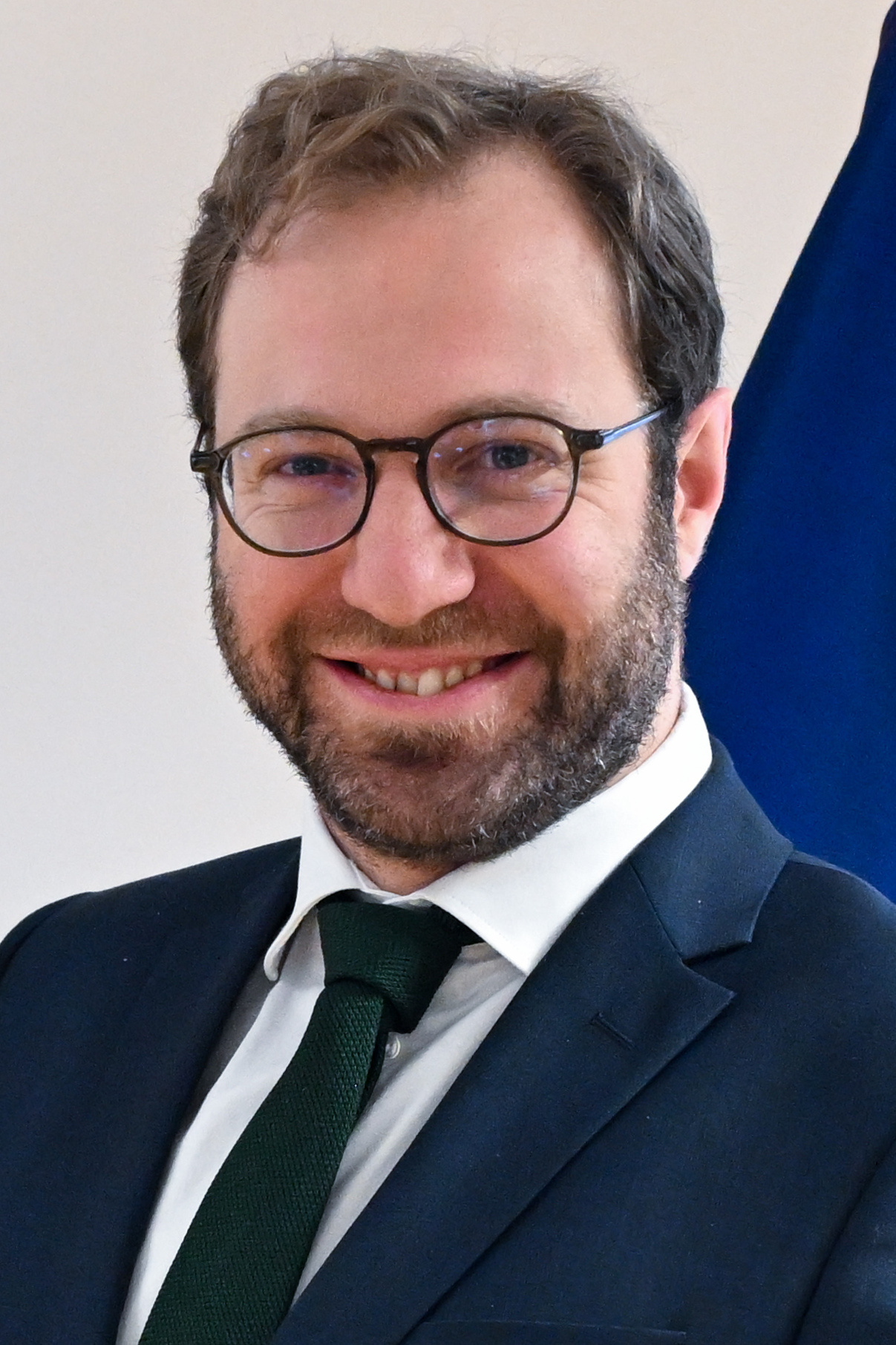
- Armand in 2024

Mayor of Annecy
- Incumbent
- Assumed office 28 March 2026
- Preceded by: François Astorg

Minister of the Economy, Finance and Industry
- In office 21 September 2024 – 23 December 2024
- Prime Minister: Michel Barnier
- Preceded by: Bruno Le Maire
- Succeeded by: Éric Lombard

Member of the National Assembly for Haute-Savoie's 2nd constituency
- In office 25 January 2025 – 27 April 2026
- Preceded by: Danièle Carteron
- Succeeded by: Danièle Carteron
- In office 22 June 2022 – 21 October 2024
- Preceded by: Jacques Rey
- Succeeded by: Danièle Carteron

Personal details
- Born: Antoine Joseph Patrick Armand; 11 September 1991 (age 34) Paris, France
- Party: Renaissance
- Relations: Louis Armand (great-grandfather)
- Education: Lycée Henri-IV
- Alma mater: École Normale Supérieure; Paris-Sorbonne University; Paris School of Economics; École nationale d'administration
- Profession: Civil servant

Antoine Joseph Patrick Armand (French pronunciation: [ɑ̃twan aʁmɑ̃]; born 10 September 1991) is a French civil servant and politician who has served as mayor of Annecy since 2026. A member of Renaissance (RE, formerly La République En Marche!), he previously served as Minister of the Economy, Finance and Industrial and Digital Sovereignty in the Barnier government from September to December 2024 and represented the 2nd constituency of the Haute-Savoie department in the National Assembly from 2022 to 2024 and again from 2025 to 2026. He also served as president of the National Assembly Committee on Economic Affairs from July to October 2024.

In September 2024, President Emmanuel Macron appointed Armand as Minister of the Economy, Finance and Industrial and Digital Sovereignty. At 33 years old, Armand became one of the youngest ministers to hold this position in recent French history. His appointment came at a time when the government faced economic challenges and the need for fiscal management. He returned to the National Assembly after the Barnier government was toppled by a motion of no confidence on 4 December 2024.

== Family ==
He is the great-grandson of engineer, senior civil servant and French Resistance fighter Louis Armand (1905–1971), former chairman of the SNCF, France's national state-owned railway company. He would become president of the European Atomic Energy Community (Euratom) from 1958 to 1959. He was elected a member of the Académie Française in 1963.

== Education ==
Following a high-school education at the Lycée Camille Sée in Paris where he earned his Baccalauréat, Antoine Armand studied at the economics and literary Classes préparatoires aux grandes écoles (B/L; 'Higher school preparatory classes') at the prestigious Lycée Henri-IV in Paris (2009–2011).

After a national exam, he read economics at the École normale supérieure de Paris (2011–2015). At the same time, he pursued a 2-year master's degree at the Paris School of Economics, his thesis focusing on German ordoliberalism (2012–2014). He also graduated from the Sorbonne in 2012 with a bachelor degree in philosophy. In 2015, he obtained a research master's degree in international relations at the Sorbonne (2013–2015), on the German responsibility for the Armenian genocide.

After another exam, Armand entered the École nationale d'administration (class of Georges Clemenceau, 2017–2018), a school training future senior civil servants (many of them also become ministers).

== Political career ==
Prior to his political career, Armand worked as a civil servant at the General Inspectorate of Finance.

In the 2021 departmental election, he unsuccessfully ran for the Departmental Council of Haute-Savoie, placing fourth in the canton of La Roche-sur-Foron in the first round as a miscellaneous centre candidate.

He was elected to the National Assembly in the 2nd constituency of Haute-Savoie in 2022, after incumbent Jacques Rey chose not to run for a full term. He was reelected in the 2024 snap election. In Parliament, Armand served on the Committee on Economic Affairs. In 2024, he was elected its president for the newly-opened 17th legislature.

In addition to his committee assignments, he was a member of the French delegation to the Franco-German Parliamentary Assembly from 2022. He was also a member of the French-German parliamentary friendship group, the French-Italian parliamentary friendship group and the French-Swiss parliamentary friendship group.

On 21 September 2024, Armand was appointed to the government of Prime Minister Michel Barnier as Minister of the Economy, Finance and Industry, replacing Bruno Le Maire. After the Barnier government fell, he was succeeded by Éric Lombard on 23 December 2024 and returned to the National Assembly.

Following the 2026 municipal election, in which the list he led won a majority in Annecy with 49.3% of the second-round vote, he was elected to the mayorship of Annecy on 28 March 2026 and to the presidency of the Communauté d'agglomération du Grand Annecy on 23 April 2026. He resigned from the National Assembly on 27 April 2026.
