= Haute-Savoie's 2nd constituency =

Constituency of the National Assembly of France

2nd constituency of Haute-Savoie
- inline Constituency of the National Assembly of France

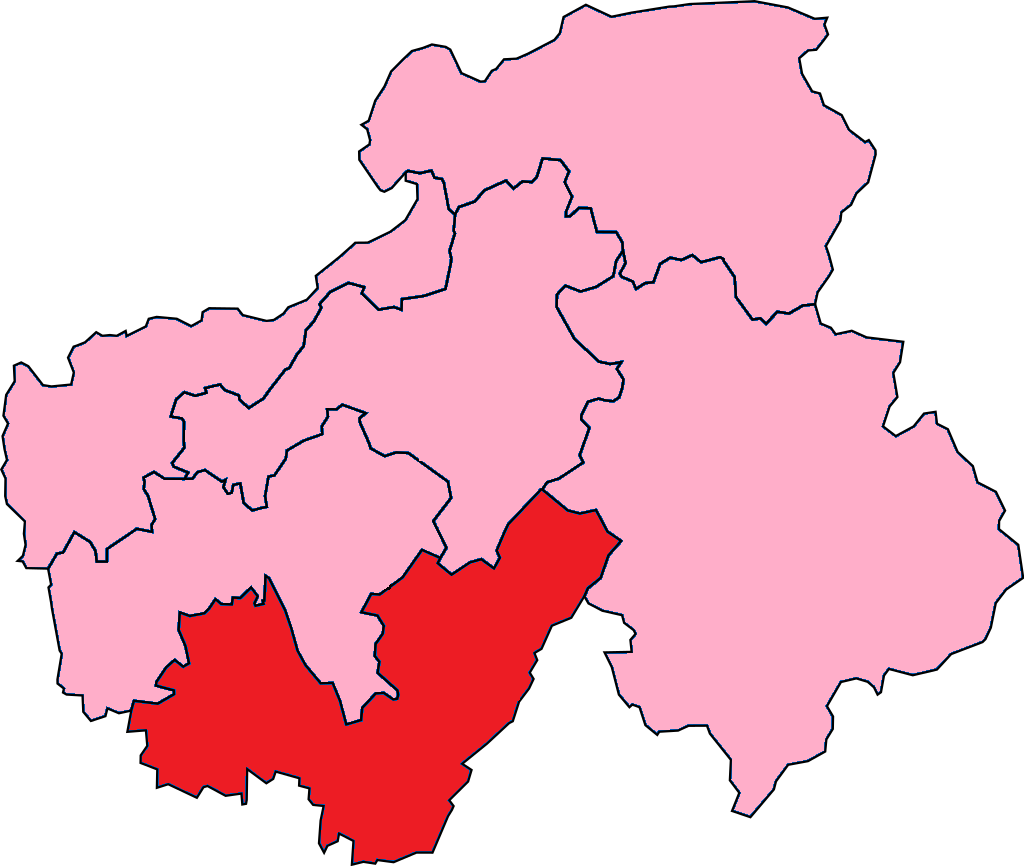
- Haute-Savoie's 2nd Constituency shown within Haute-Savoie
- Deputy: Antoine Armand; RE
- Department: Haute-Savoie
- Cantons: Alby-sur-Chéran, Annecy Centre, Annecy Nord-Est, Faverges, Seynod, Thônes
- Registered voters: 94,953

The 2nd constituency of the Haute-Savoie (French: Deuxième circonscription de la Haute-Savoie) is a French legislative constituency in the Haute-Savoie département. Like the other 576 French constituencies, it elects one MP using a two round electoral system.

== Description ==
The 2nd constituency of Haute-Savoie sits in the south west of the department including some parts of Annecy, which it shares with Haute-Savoie's 1st constituency.

The seat has historically supported centre right candidates; however, in 2017 the seat along with three others in the department fell to Emmanuel Macron's En Marche! party.

== Assembly members ==
| Election | Member | Party |
|---|---|---|
| 1988 | Bernard Bosson | UDF |
| 1993 | Bernard Bosson | UDF |
| 1997 | Bernard Bosson | UDF |
| 2002 | Bernard Bosson | UDF |
| 2007 | Lionel Tardy | DVD |
| 2012 | Lionel Tardy | UMP |
| 2017 | Frédérique Lardet | LREM |
| 2022 | Jacques Rey | LREM |
| 2022 | Antoine Armand | LREM |
| 2022 | Antoine Armand | RE |

== Election results ==
=== 2024 ===
Legislative Election 2024: Haute-Savoie's 2nd constituency
| Party | Candidate | Votes | % | ±% |
|---|---|---|---|---|
| LO | Naci Yildirim | 411 | 0.58 | n/a |
| RN | Anis Bouvard | 20,583 | 28.80 | +15.46 |
| REC | Pascal Vincent | 872 | 1.22 | −2.68 |
| DIV | Geoffrey Cornet | 139 | 0.19 | n/a |
| LR | Alexandre Richefort | 5,396 | 7.55 | n/a |
| RE (Ensemble) | Antoine Armand | 23,783 | 33.27 | +9.44 |
| DIV | Jérémy Langlade-Nouchy | 1,077 | 1.51 | n/a |
| LÉ–EELV (NFP) | Guillaume Tatu | 19,215 | 26.88 | n/a |
| Turnout | | 71,476 | 97.84 | +49.72 |
| Registered electors | | 101,693 | | |
2nd round result
| RE | Antoine Armand | 47,182 | 68.83 | +8.95 |
| RN | Anis Bouvard | 21,371 | 31.17 | n/a |
| Turnout | | 68,553 | 94.99 | +46.68 |
| Registered electors | | 101,713 | | |
| RE hold | | Swing | | |

=== 2022 ===
Legislative Election 2022: Haute-Savoie's 2nd constituency
| Party | Candidate | Votes | % | ±% |
|---|---|---|---|---|
| LREM (Ensemble) | Antoine Armand | 11,329 | 23.83 | -16.87 |
| PCF (NUPÉS) | Loris Fontana | 10,931 | 22.99 | +8.71 |
| DVD | Lionel Tardy* | 9,093 | 19.12 | N/A |
| RN | Anaîs Nanche | 6,345 | 13.34 | +4.55 |
| UDI (UDC) | Catherine Pacoret | 2,473 | 5.20 | −20.51 |
| REC | San Hippomène | 1,856 | 3.90 | N/A |
| DVE | Pascal Sciabbarrasi** | 1,621 | 3.41 | N/A |
| DSV | Willy Collomb-Patton | 1,011 | 2.13 | N/A |
| DVE | Christian Curdy | 989 | 2.08 | N/A |
| Others | N/A | 1,235 | - | − |
| Turnout | | 47,550 | 48.12 | −0.38 |
2nd round result
| LREM (Ensemble) | Antoine Armand | 25,809 | 59.88 | +6.28 |
| PCF (NUPÉS) | Loris Fontana | 17,290 | 40.12 | N/A |
| Turnout | | 43,099 | 46.31 | +6.45 |
| LREM hold | | | | |

* Tardy stood for LR at the previous election, but as a non-aligned right candidate in 2022. LR endorsed Pacoret, the UDI candidate, as part of the UDC alliance.

** Sciabbarrasi stood as a dissident EELV candidate, without the support of the NUPES alliance, of which EELV is a member.

=== 2017 ===
Legislative Election 2017: Haute-Savoie's 2nd constituency
| Party | Candidate | Votes | % | ±% |
|---|---|---|---|---|
| LREM | Frédérique Lardet | 18,749 | 40.72 | |
| LR | Lionel Tardy | 11,836 | 25.71 | |
| FN | Vincent Lecaillon | 4,046 | 8.79 | |
| LFI | Yann Burguiere | 3,276 | 7.11 | |
| EELV | Jeannie Tremblay | 2,362 | 5.13 | |
| PCF | Loris Fontana | 938 | 2.04 | |
| Others | N/A | 4,838 | | |
| Turnout | | 46,045 | 48.50 | |
2nd round result
| LREM | Frédérique Lardet | 20,287 | 53.60 | |
| LR | Lionel Tardy | 17,560 | 46.40 | |
| Turnout | | 37,847 | 39.86 | |
| LREM gain from LR | | | | |

=== 2012 ===
Legislative Election 2012: Haute-Savoie's 2nd constituency
| Party | Candidate | Votes | % | ±% |
|---|---|---|---|---|
| UMP | Lionel Tardy | 21,668 | 41.72 | |
| PS | Denis Duperthuy | 15,237 | 29.34 | |
| FN | Claude Biesse | 6,561 | 12.63 | |
| EELV | François Astorg | 2,632 | 5.07 | |
| FG | Nathalie Hiraux | 1,904 | 3.67 | |
| MoDem | Laurent Viotto | 1,682 | 3.24 | |
| Others | N/A | 2,256 | | |
| Turnout | | 51,940 | 57.52 | |
2nd round result
| UMP | Lionel Tardy | 26,360 | 56.50 | |
| PS | Denis Duperthuy | 20,297 | 43.50 | |
| Turnout | | 46,657 | 51.69 | |
| UMP gain from DVD | | | | |

=== 2007 ===
Legislative Election 2007: Haute-Savoie's 2nd constituency
| Party | Candidate | Votes | % | ±% |
|---|---|---|---|---|
| DVD | Lionel Tardy | 16,904 | 34.16 | |
| UMP | Bernard Bosson | 12,732 | 25.73 | |
| PS | Claire Donzel | 9,738 | 19.68 | |
| LV | Thierry Billet | 3,456 | 6.98 | |
| FN | Marie Favre | 2,092 | 4.23 | |
| EXG | Bethsabée Lunel | 1,216 | 2.46 | |
| Others | N/A | 2,479 | | |
| Turnout | | 50,286 | 58.04 | |
2nd round result
| DVD | Lionel Tardy | 20,434 | 55.51 | |
| UMP | Bernard Bosson | 16,379 | 44.49 | |
| Turnout | | 41,486 | 47.89 | |
| DVD gain from UDF | | | | |

=== 2002 ===
Legislative Election 2002: Haute-Savoie's 2nd constituency
| Party | Candidate | Votes | % | ±% |
|---|---|---|---|---|
| UDF | Bernard Bosson | 23,044 | 47.61 | |
| LV | Thierry Billet | 11,649 | 24.07 | |
| FN | Marie-José Favre | 5,570 | 11.51 | |
| DVD | Henri Larget | 1,136 | 2.35 | |
| REG | Evelyne Anthoine | 1,098 | 2.27 | |
| PCF | Mauricette Charlet | 982 | 2.03 | |
| DVE | Jeanne Martini | 970 | 2.00 | |
| Others | N/A | 3,935 | | |
| Turnout | | 49,379 | 63.67 | |
2nd round result
| UDF | Bernard Bosson | 24,423 | 61.38 | |
| LV | Thierry Billet | 15,364 | 38.62 | |
| Turnout | | 41,549 | 53.58 | |
| UDF hold | | | | |

=== 1997 ===
Legislative Election 1997: Haute-Savoie's 2nd constituency
| Party | Candidate | Votes | % | ±% |
|---|---|---|---|---|
| FD (UDF) | Bernard Bosson | 16,000 | 37.74 | |
| PS | Jacques Dalex | 9,209 | 21.72 | |
| FN | Jean-Luc Mesnage | 6,331 | 14.93 | |
| LV | Thierry Billet | 2,336 | 5.51 | |
| PCF | André Genot | 2,048 | 4.83 | |
| GE | Jacques Meslin | 1,704 | 4.02 | |
| LDI | Marc Beaumont | 1,680 | 3.96 | |
| LO | Edith Roche | 1,162 | 2.74 | |
| Others | N/A | 1,929 | | |
| Turnout | | 45,469 | 63.74 | |
2nd round result
| FD (UDF) | Bernard Bosson | 25,513 | 57.63 | |
| PS | Jacques Delax | 18,754 | 42.37 | |
| Turnout | | 47,577 | 66.70 | |
| FD hold | | | | |
