= Patrick Braouezec =

French politician (born 1950)

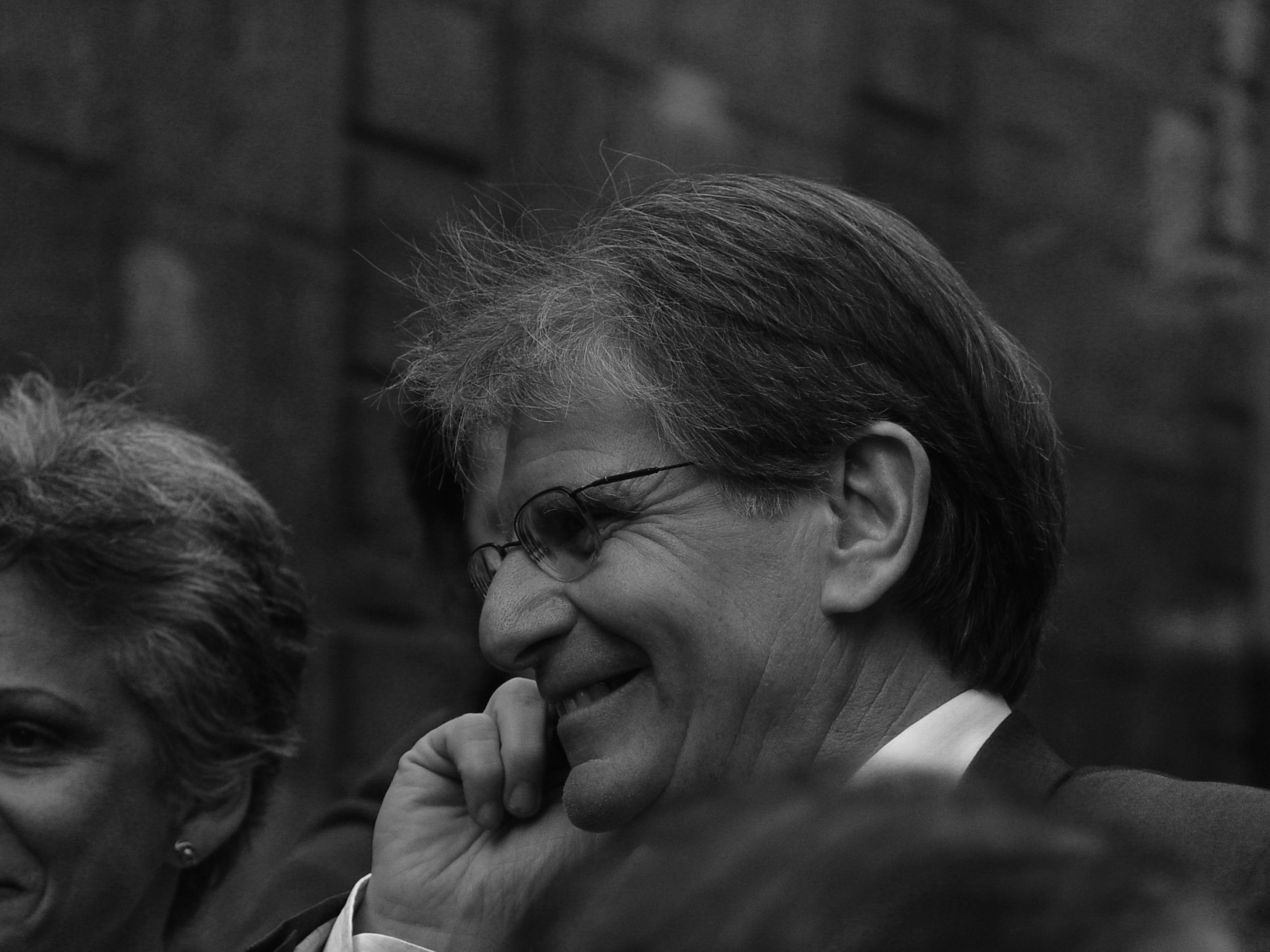

Mayor of Saint-Denis
- In office 1991–2004
- Preceded by: Marcelin Berthelot
- Succeeded by: Didier Paillard

Member of the National Assembly for Seine-Saint-Denis's 2nd constituency
- In office 1993–2012
- Preceded by: Marcelin Berthelot
- Succeeded by: Mathieu Hanotin

Personal details
- Born: 11 December 1950 (age 75) Paris, France
- Party: Left Front

Patrick Braouezec (French pronunciation: [patʁik bʁawezɛk], born 11 December 1950) is a member of the National Assembly of France. He is the current President of Plaine Commune metropolitan region and represents the Seine-Saint-Denis department and is a member of the Gauche démocrate et républicaine. Patrick Braouezec is also an active member of the world organization of local and regional governments United Cities and Local Governments, and is the acting co-chair its Committee on Social Inclusion, Participatory Democracy and Human Rights.
