= Xavier Bonnefont =

French politician (born 1979)

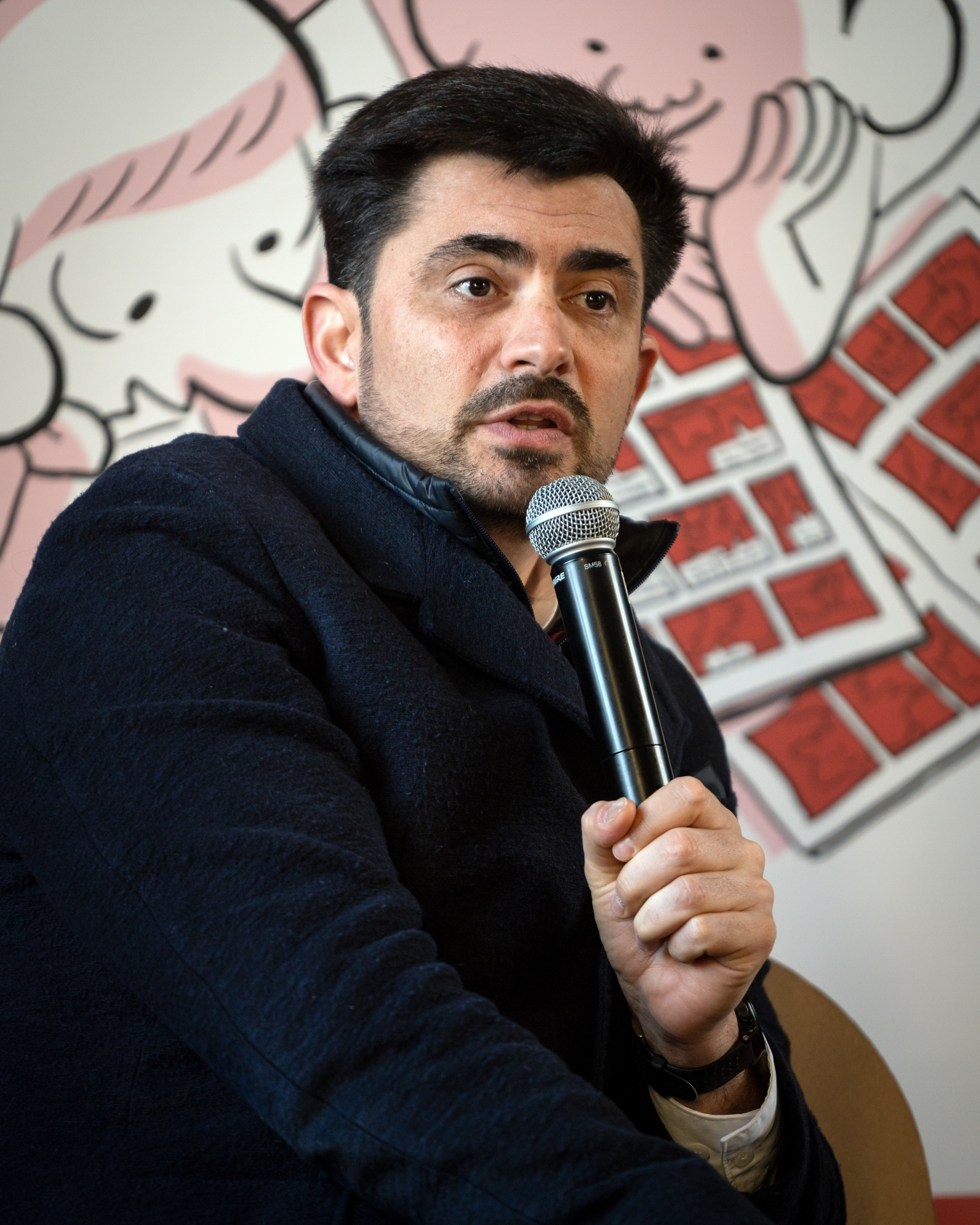
- Bonnefont in 2013

Mayor of Angoulême
- Incumbent
- Assumed office 4 April 2014
- Preceded by: Philippe Lavaud

Personal details
- Born: 9 December 1979 (age 46)
- Party: Horizons

Xavier Bonnefont (born 9 December 1979) is a French politician. He has served as mayor of Angoulême since 2014, and as president of Grand Angoulême since 2020. He has been a member of the Regional Council of Nouvelle-Aquitaine since 2016.
