= Nicolas Daragon =

French politician

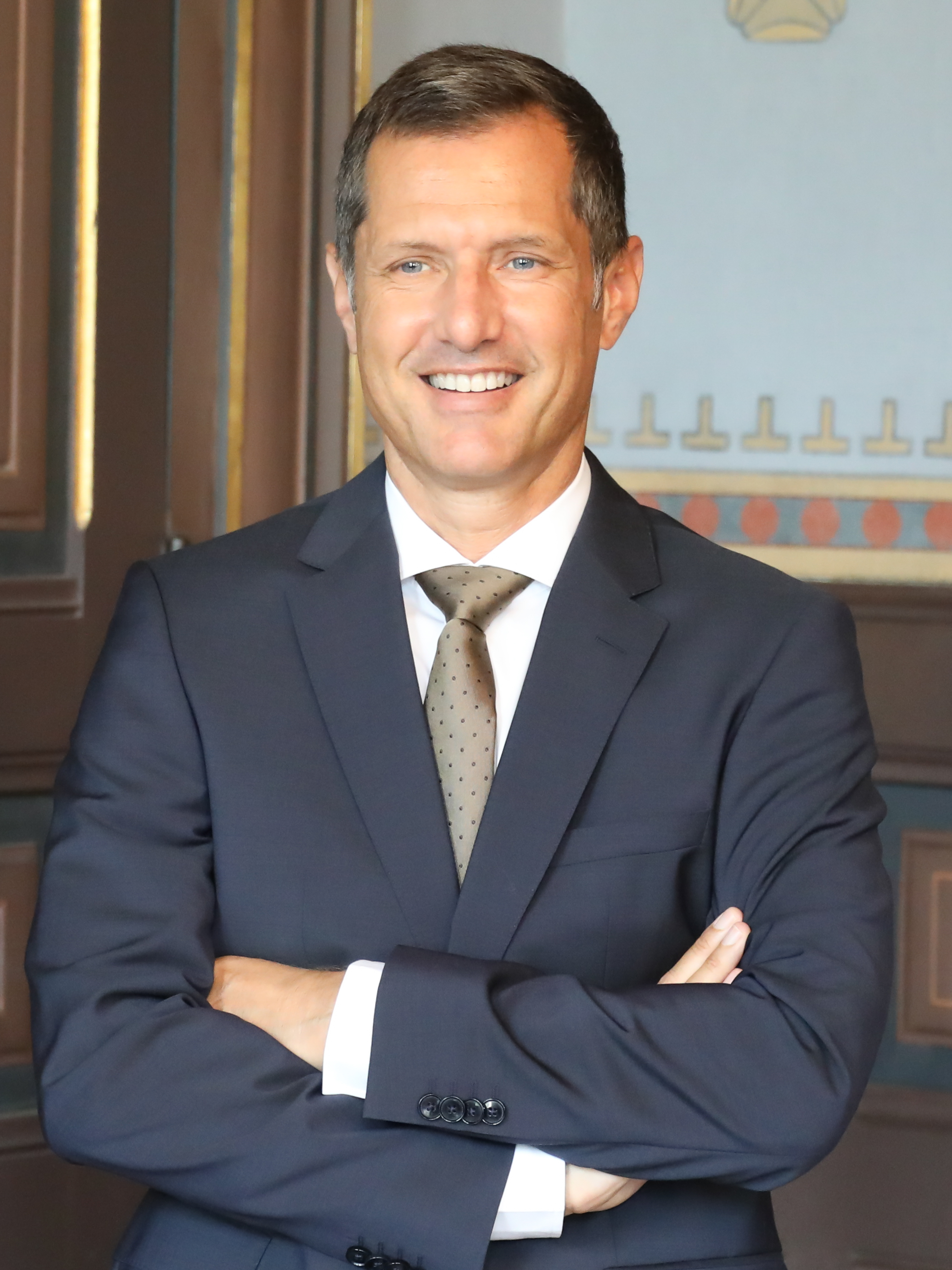
- Daragon in 2022

Minister for Daily Safety
- In office 21 September 2024 – 23 December 2024
- Prime Minister: Michel Barnier

Personal details
- Born: 12 March 1972 (age 54)
- Party: The Republicans

Nicolas Daragon (born 12 March 1972), is a French politician of the Republicans (LR) who became mayor of Valence in 2014 and vice-president of the Regional Council of Auvergne-Rhône-Alpes in 2016.

From September to December 2024 he was minister for daily security in the government of Prime Minister Michel Barnier.

In the Republicans' 2025 leadership election Daragon endorsed Laurent Wauquiez to succeed Éric Ciotti as the party's new chair and joined his campaign team.
