= Lionel Tardy =

French politician

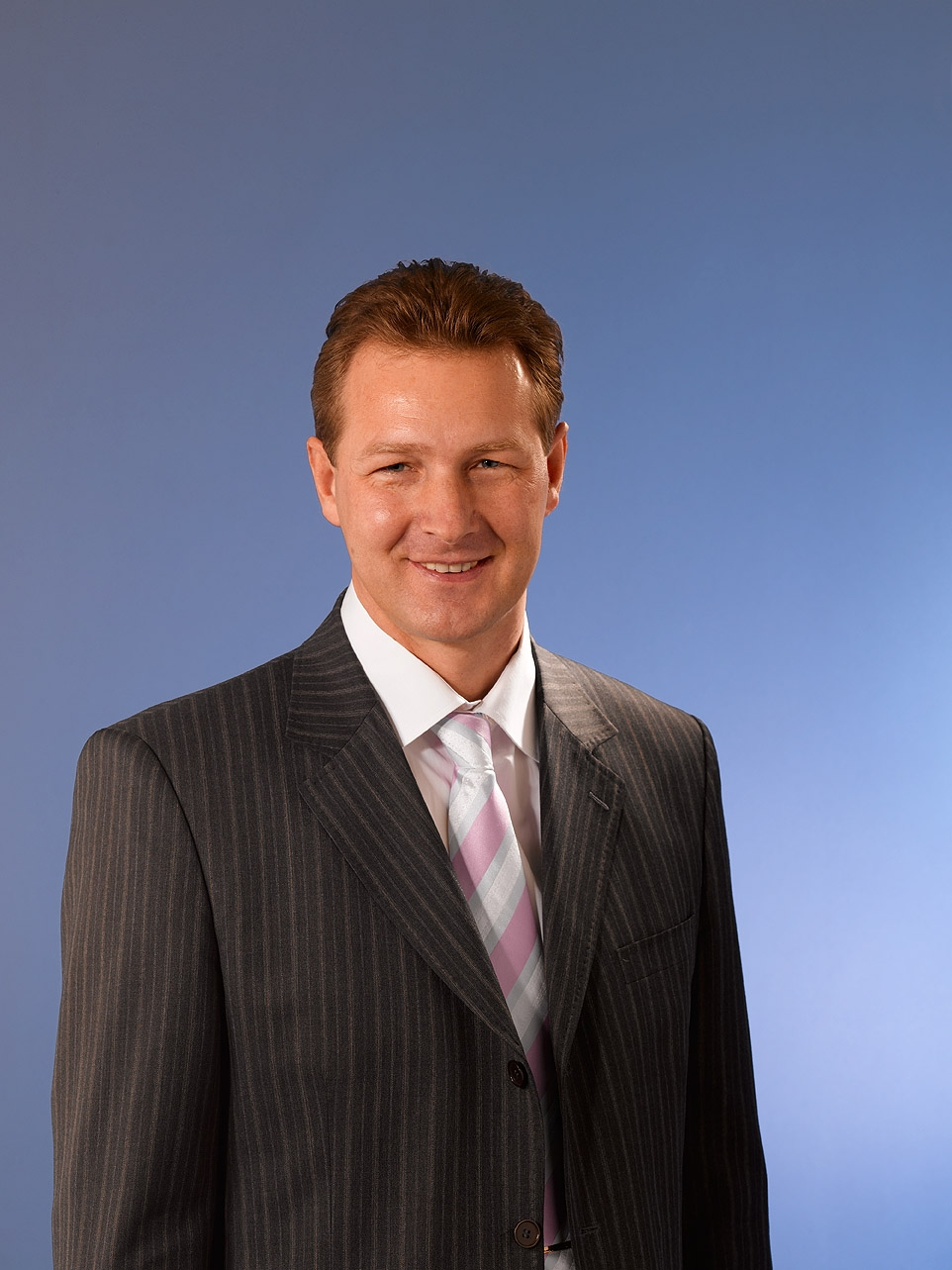

Lionel Tardy (born 7 June 1966 in Annecy-le-Vieux, Haute-Savoie) was a member of the National Assembly of France. He represented the 2nd constituency of the Haute-Savoie department, and is a member of the Union for a Popular Movement.

== Career ==
He is a computer scientist by profession, Lionel Tardy is manager of the company services and computer consulting LTI (Lionel Tardy Computer). It employs 18 people and specializes in the sale of complete IT solutions to SMEs in the Savoy. He became vice president of the service sector of the CGPME of Haute-Savoie, and President from November 2005 to January 2007.

He resigned to run for the 2007 French legislative election. Although new to politics, he was elected on 17 June 2007, for the XIIIth legislature (2007–2012), in the second district of Haute-Savoie, beating the second round, the incumbent Bernard Bosson (New Centre) with 55.51% of the vote. He is committed to Cumul des mandats. His election against a leading political figure can be explained by the informal support he enjoyed from many elected officials of the UMP, opposed to Mr. Bosson for his support of Nicolas Sarkozy during the presidential election.

Although labeled "a member of the right", however he sits in the UMP, in the National Assembly. He is a member of the Committee on Economic Affairs and Vice President of SMB. He noted the 18 October 2007, during the budget debate in 2008, by an amendment to the heads of SMEs to reduce their ISF up to the amounts they invest for five years in society. This provision has raised some concerns in the ranks of the left, and among the UMP. He is Chairman of the Working Group on payment periods in the context of the law on the modernization of the economy.

In 2009, during discussions on the Creation and Internet law (HADOPI law), he was the member for the Presidential Majority, investing most actively against the principle of flexible response, with technical and legal arguments, both in the chamber and the media. Part of the arguments were taken up by the Constitutional Council, in the revision of the law. He opposed the revised bill. In 2011, he proposed a "freedom of panorama" amendment, which was defeated.

On 30 June 2010, he took part in the hearing of Raymond Domenech by Parliament about the World Cup in South Africa. Opposed to the hearing in camera, Lionel Tardy transcribed the remarks via Twitter.

On 14 July 2011, Lionel Tardy told the Green Party candidate to the presidential election Eva Joly, who has the French and Norwegian double nationality, to go back to Norway.

He was the DVD candidate in Haute-Savoie's 2nd constituency in the 2022 French legislative election but came in third place.
