= Charles Bertin Gaston Chapuis de Tourville =

French general

Charles Bertin Gaston Chapuis de Tourville (French pronunciation: [ʃaʁl bɛʁtɛ̃ ɡastɔ̃ ʃapɥi də tuʁvil]; 1740 in Hettange-Grande – November 22, 1809 in Cattenom), Divisional General during the French Revolution and the First French Empire.

He was born in 1740 in Hettange-Grande. He became Maréchal de camp (major general) on 12 July 1793 and divisional general on 8 March 1793. He died on 22 November 1809 in Cattenom.
