= Raphaël Adam (politician) =

French politician (born 1987)

Mayor of Nanterre
- Incumbent
- Assumed office 19 October 2023
- Preceded by: Patrick Jarry

Personal details
- Born: 28 July 1987 (age 39) Clamecy, Nièvre, France
- Party: Independent (since 2007)
- Other political affiliations: Socialist Party (until 2007)
- Children: 2
- Education: Paris Nanterre University

Raphaël Adam (born 28 July 1987) is a French politician who has served as mayor of Nanterre since 2023.

== Early life and career ==
Adam was born in Nièvre in 1987. Until the 2007 presidential election, he was a member of the Socialist Party. He was elected municipal councillor of Beaulieu in 2008, and was re-elected in 2014. He studied communication science and political science, and moved to Nanterre where he worked for the Ministry of Ecology and the Ministry of Labour. In the 2020 municipal elections, he was elected municipal councillor of Nanterre, and was appointed as a deputy mayor. He was elected mayor in 2023, upon the resignation of Patrick Jarry.
