= Seine-Saint-Denis's 9th constituency =

Constituency of the National Assembly of France

9th constituency of Seine-Saint-Denis
- inline Constituency of the National Assembly of France

- Deputy: Aurélie Trouvé; LFI
- Department: Seine-Saint-Denis
- Cantons: 4
- Registered voters: 70,180

The 9th constituency of Seine-Saint-Denis (French: Neuvième circonscription de la Seine-Saint-Denis) is one of the 12 legislative constituencies in Seine-Saint-Denis département of France (93). Like the other 576 French constituencies, it elects one MP using the two-round system.

== Deputies ==
Election	Member	Party	Source
1988	Véronique Neiertz	PS	
1993	Véronique Neiertz	PS	
1997	Véronique Neiertz	PS	
2002	Élisabeth Guigou	PS	
2007	Élisabeth Guigou	PS	
2012	Claude Bartolone	PS	
2017	Sabine Rubin	LFI	
2022	Aurélie Trouvé	LFI	
2024	Aurélie Trouvé	LFI	

== Election results ==
=== 2024 ===
Candidate	Party	Alliance	First round			Second round		
Candidate	Party	Alliance	Votes	%	+/–	Votes	%	+/–
Aurélie Trouvé	LFI	NFP	29,935	63.19	+4.90			
Clara Bourassin	RN		7,156	15.11	+6.98			
Manon Chaumette	MoDem	ENS	7,119	15.03	-5.26			
Robenson Pierre	LR		2,073	4.38	-0.30			
Jean-Paul Burot	LO		681	1.44	+0.24			
Christel Keiser	DIV		407	0.86	N/A			
Valid votes			47,371	97.90	+0.16			
Blank votes			696	1.44	-0.16			
Null votes			319	0.66	±0.00			
Turnout			48,386	63.48	+20.98			
Abstentions			27,841	36.52	-20.98			
Registered voters			76,227					
Source: Ministry of the Interior, Le Monde
Result						LFI HOLD		

=== 2022 ===
Legislative Election 2022: Seine-Saint-Denis's 9th constituency
Party	Candidate	Votes	%	±%
LFI (NUPÉS)	Aurélie Trouvé	16,393	53.53	+5.82
MoDem (Ensemble)	Alexandre Saada	6,214	20.29	-11.35
RN	Eric Kozelko	2,491	8.13	−1.34
DVG	Jean-Paul Lefebvre	1,260	4.11	N/A
LR (UDC)	Robenson Pierre	1,049	3.43	N/A
REC	Laure Garrigue	959	3.13	N/A
DVE	Aloïs Lang-Rousseau	876	2.86	N/A
Others	N/A	1,384		
Turnout		31,335	42.50	+1.12
2nd round result
LFI (NUPÉS)	Aurélie Trouvé	20,285	69.24	+16.98
MoDem (Ensemble)	Alexandre Saada	9,010	30.76	−16.98
Turnout		29,295	41.78	+4.81
LFI hold				

=== 2017 ===
Legislative Election 2017: Seine-Saint-Denis's 9th constituency
Party	Candidate	Votes	%	±%
LREM	Jeanne Dromard	8,993	31.64	N/A
LFI	Sabine Rubin	5,404	19.01	N/A
PS	Daniel Guirand	4,580	16.11	−32.55
FN	Natacha Ferreira	2,693	9.47	−4.99
PCF	Sofia Dauvergne	1,936	6.81	−6.23
EELV	Dominique Busson	1,644	5.78	+0.43
UDI	Sonia Bakhti Alout	1,245	4.38	−8.42
Others	N/A	1,932		
Turnout		29,081	41.38	−7.6
2nd round result
LFI	Sabine Rubin	12,533	52.26	N/A
LREM	Jeanne Dromard	11,447	47.74	N/A
Turnout		25,947	36.97	−8.78
LFI gain from PS		Swing		

=== 2012 ===
Legislative Election 2012: Seine-Saint-Denis's 9th constituency
Party	Candidate	Votes	%	±%
PS	Claude Bartolone	15,857	48.66	+10.92
FN	Elisabeth Courtial	4,713	14.46	+8.77
FG	Pascale Labbe	4,251	13.04	+5.34
NM	Dref Mendaci	4,171	12.80	N/A
EELV	Pierre Stoeber	1,743	5.35	+0.99
MoDem	Georges Amzel	711	2.18	−5.55
Others	N/A	1,144		
Turnout		32,590	48.98	−4.27
2nd round result
PS	Claude Bartolone	22,921	75.30	+15.05
FN	Elisabeth Courtial	7,517	24.70	N/A
Turnout		30,438	45.75	−5.66
PS hold				

=== 2007 ===
Legislative Election 2007: Seine-Saint-Denis's 9th constituency
Party	Candidate	Votes	%	±%
PS	Élisabeth Guigou	10,931	37.74	+3.84
UMP	Georgia Vincent	8,659	29.90	+3.31
MoDem	Jean Thary	2,239	7.73	N/A
PCF	Céline Curt	2,229	7.70	−2.52
FN	Marie-Estelle Prejean	1,649	5.69	−9.67
LV	Anne Deo	1,264	4.36	−0.26
Far left	Erwan Hyvaert	903	3.12	N/A
Others	N/A	1,088		
Turnout		29,439	53.25	−8.13
2nd round result
PS	Élisabeth Guigou	16,622	60.25	+3.85
UMP	Georgia Vincent	10,968	39.75	−3.85
Turnout		28,420	51.41	−4.21
PS hold				

=== 2002 ===
Legislative Election 2002: Seine-Saint-Denis's 9th constituency
Party	Candidate	Votes	%	±%
PS	Élisabeth Guigou	9,961	33.90	+5.30
UMP	Georgia Vincent	7,813	26.59	N/A
FN	Marie-Estelle Prejean	4,512	15.36	−6.71
PCF	Gilles Garnier	3,002	10.22	−8.46
LV	Anne Deo	1,356	4.62	N/A
Far left	Mohamed Moghrani	865	2.94	N/A
Others	N/A	1,873		
Turnout		29,886	61.38	−3.42
2nd round result
PS	Élisabeth Guigou	14,593	56.40	−11.54
UMP	Georgia Vincent	11,283	43.60	N/A
Turnout		27,073	55.62	−10.06
PS hold				

=== 1997 ===
Legislative Election 1997: Seine-Saint-Denis's 9th constituency
Party	Candidate	Votes	%	±%
PS	Véronique Neiertz	9,281	28.60	
FN	Gilles Barial	7,163	22.07	
PCF	Jean-Louis Mons	6,064	18.68	
UDF	Georgia Vincent	5,477	16.88	
LO	Jean-Louis Gaillard	1,133	3.49	
DVE	Ricardo Coronado	903	2.78	
MEI	Wilfrid Falkenburg	689	2.12	
Others	N/A	1,746		
Turnout		33,562	64.80	
2nd round result
PS	Véronique Neiertz	21,506	67.94	
FN	Gilles Barial	10,147	32.06	
Turnout		34,548	65.68	
PS hold				
