= Isabelle Chappuis =

Swiss politician (born 1971)

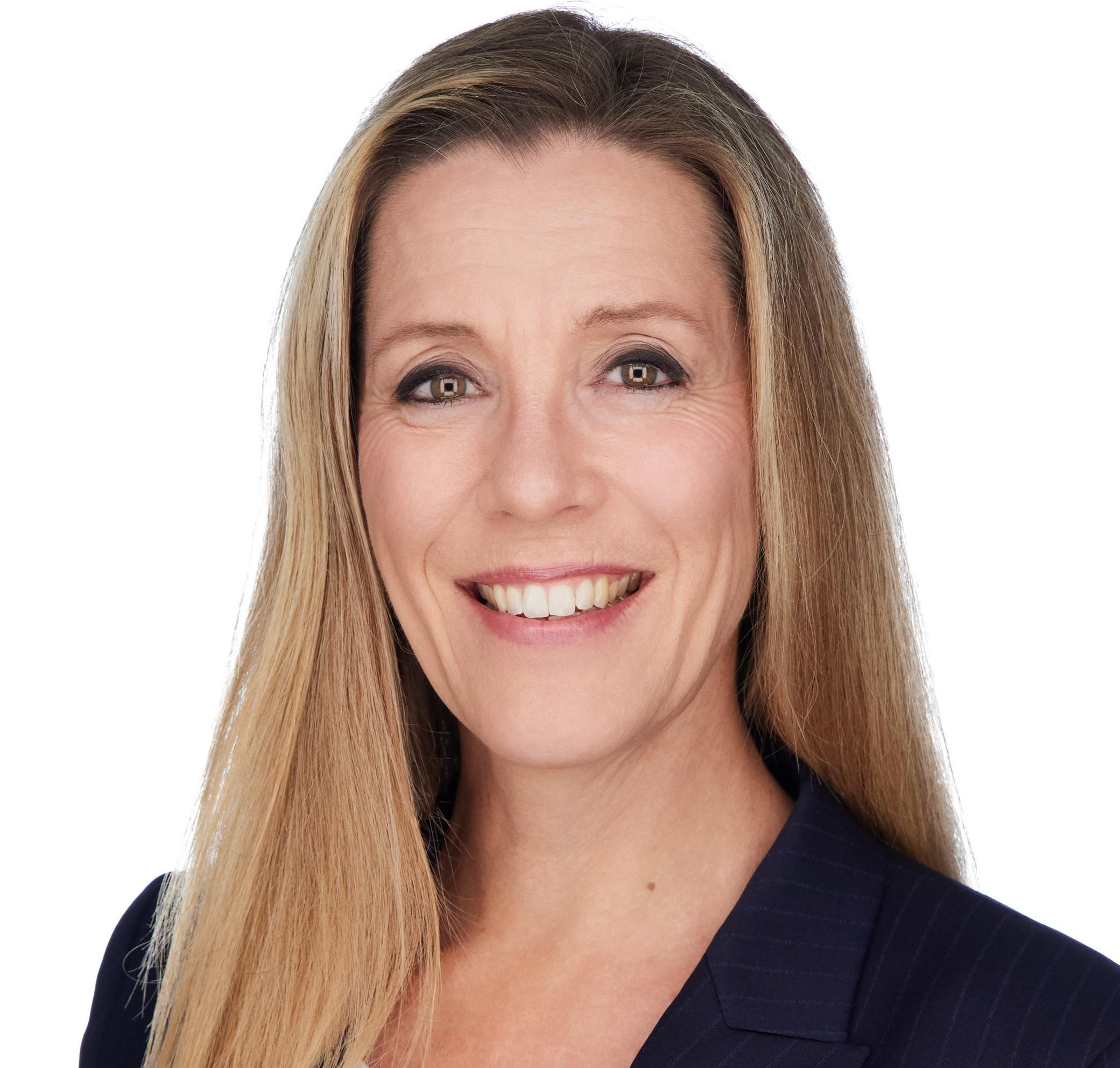
Isabelle Chappuis

Isabelle Chappuis (born 17 March 1971; resident of Jorat-Mézières) is a Swiss politician (Die Mitte) and economist. She has been a member of the National Council since 2023.

== Life ==
Isabelle Chappuis grew up in Morges and Lausanne. She studied economics at the University of St. Gallen. After a period in the financial sector in Zurich, including at Swiss Re, she returned to the canton of Vaud. She works for the Faculty of Economics and Business Administration at the University of Lausanne, where she is responsible for the EMBA diplomas and the continuing education department. She also heads the Future Lab of the Faculty of Economics and Business Administration and was elected to the Forum des 100 in 2020.

Her preferred topics are the future of work and education.

She is married, has three children and lives in Tolochenaz.

== Political career ==
Isabelle Chappuis served in the municipal parliament (legislature) of the municipality of Tolochenaz for eight years. She did not run for re-election when her husband was elected president.

Marie-France Roth Pasquier persuaded her to join der Mitte in 2022. Chappuis then became president of the Center Women Vaud and joined the board of the Center Women Switzerland.

She ran in the 2023 Swiss federal election, where all her posters were stolen during the campaign in her region. She was elected to the National Council despite having, according to the press "very little experience in politics".

== See also ==
- List of members of the National Council of Switzerland (2023–2027)
