= Presidential majority =

Term in French politics

In French politics, the presidential majority (French: majorité présidentielle) designates the political parties and parliamentary groups in the Parliament of France which support the action of the President of France when they are in the majority in the National Assembly.

French governments can usually only fully implement their manifesto if they have a majority in the National Assembly. In the 2022 French legislative election, Emmanuel Macron lost his presidential majority due to the surge of the National Rally and NUPES.
