= 2026 Nancy municipal election =

Local election in France

- 15 March 2026 (first round); 22 March 2026 (second round)

All 55 members of the Municipal Council 29 seats needed for a majority
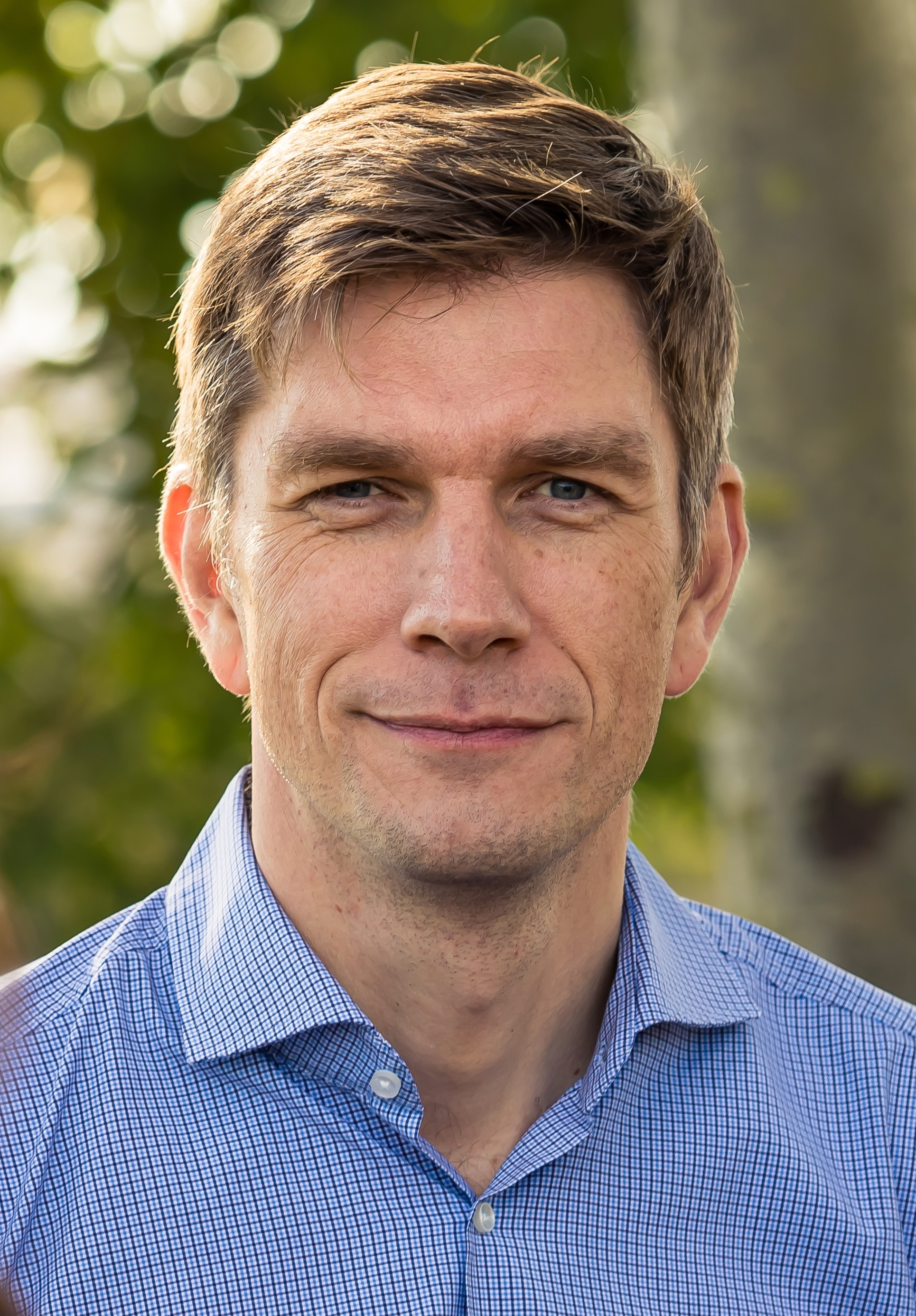

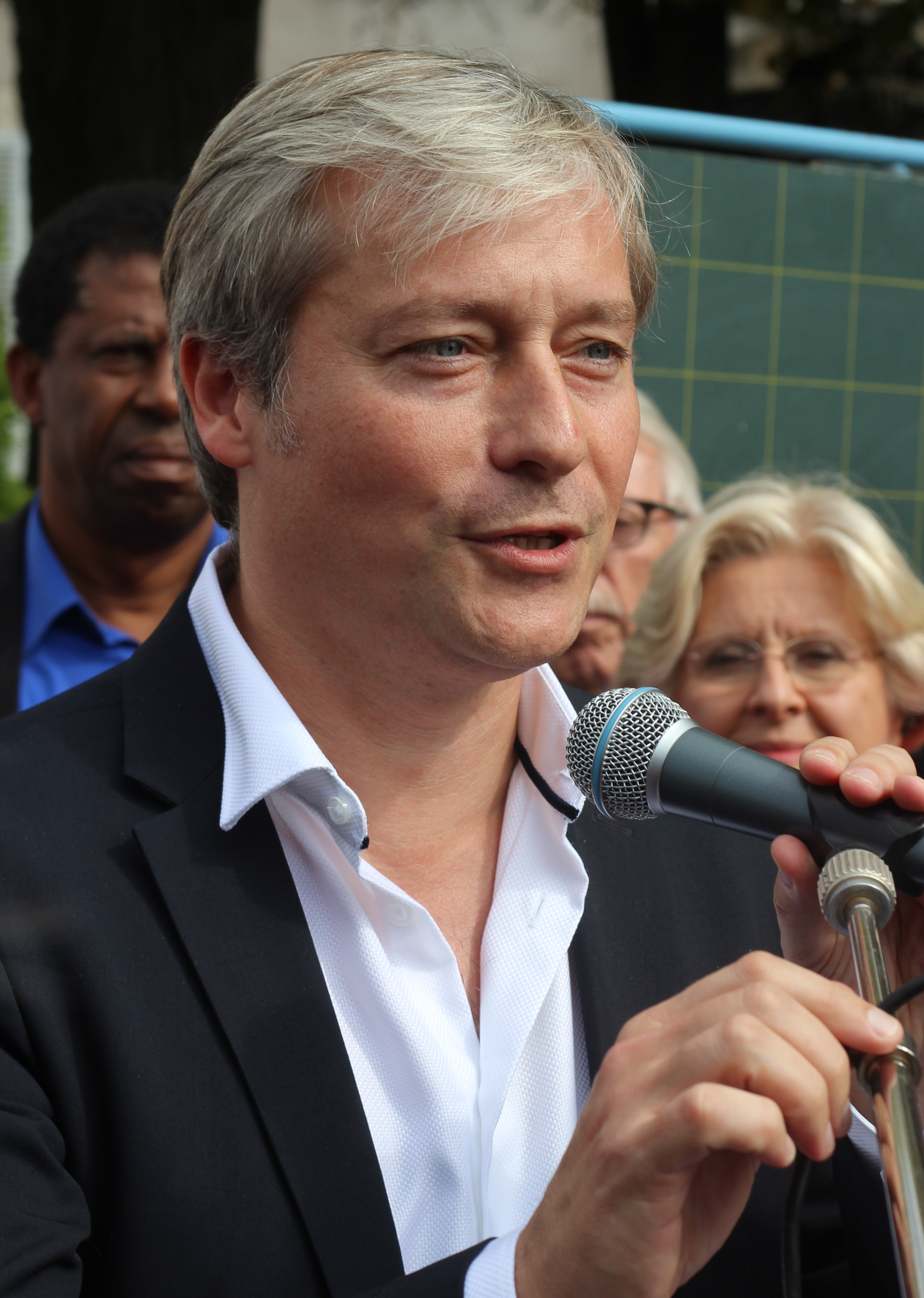
	First party	Second party	Third party
Candidate	Mathieu Klein	Laurent Hénart	Sarah Farghaly
Party	PS	PRV	LFI
Last election	43 seats	12 seats (Note: Includes parties that ran separately in the 2020 election.)	0 seats
Seats won	42	11	2
Seat change	▼1	▼1	▲2
Popular vote	12,424	9,633	3,410
Percentage	43.11%	33.43%	11.83%
Popular vote (2nd)	14,353	11,482	3,056
Percentage (2nd)	49.68%	39.74%	10.58%
Mayor before election
Mathieu Klein
PS
Elected Mayor
Mathieu Klein
PS

The 2026 municipal elections in Nancy took place on 15 and 22 March 2026 alongside municipal elections across France. They renewed the municipal council and the metropolitan council (Conseil communautaire) of the Greater Nancy metropolitan area.

== Voting procedures ==
=== Dates ===
On 27 August 2025, the dates of the election were set by a decree as 15 and 22 March 2026.

=== Voting method ===
The election of municipal and metropolitan councilors takes place using a two-round list system with a majority bonus: candidates run on complete lists, with the possibility of two additional candidates. During the vote, no additions, deletions, or changes to the order of presentation of the lists are permitted. Each ballot paper contains two lists: one list of candidates for the municipal elections only, and a list of those also running for the metropolitan council.

The number of seats to be filled on the Nancy municipal council corresponds to that of municipalities with a population between 100,000 and 150,000 inhabitants, i.e., 55 seats. Municipal councilors are elected by direct universal suffrage for a six-year term. The election is decided in the first round if a list obtains an absolute majority. If necessary, a second round is held. Lists that obtained at least 10% of the votes cast in the first round may participate in the second round. Candidates from lists that obtained more than 5% of the votes cast in the first round may join another list.

The list receiving the most votes is allocated half the seats, rounded up to the nearest whole number if necessary. Thus, the majority list automatically obtains 28 seats. The remaining 27 seats are allocated by proportional representation using the highest average method to lists that obtained at least 5% of the votes cast in the second round (or in the first round in the case of a single round).

== Context ==
=== Previous vote ===
The 2020 municipal elections were marked by massive abstention due to the COVID-19 pandemic, with participation in the first round collapsing from 59% in 2014 to 37% in 2020. On the local level, the list led by the socialist Mathieu Klein, supported by the French Communist Party, joined in the 2nd round by the Europe Ecology - The Greens - Generation.s list, managed to wrest the mayoralty from the outgoing mayor Laurent Hénart, thus obtaining 43 seats. The right-wing and centrist list, bringing together the Radical Movement, La République en Marche and Les Républicains, which was therefore led by the outgoing mayor, is relegated to the role of opposition and obtains only 12 seats.

=== Local political context ===
In 2021, Mathieu Klein defeated Laurent Hénart.

== Candidates ==
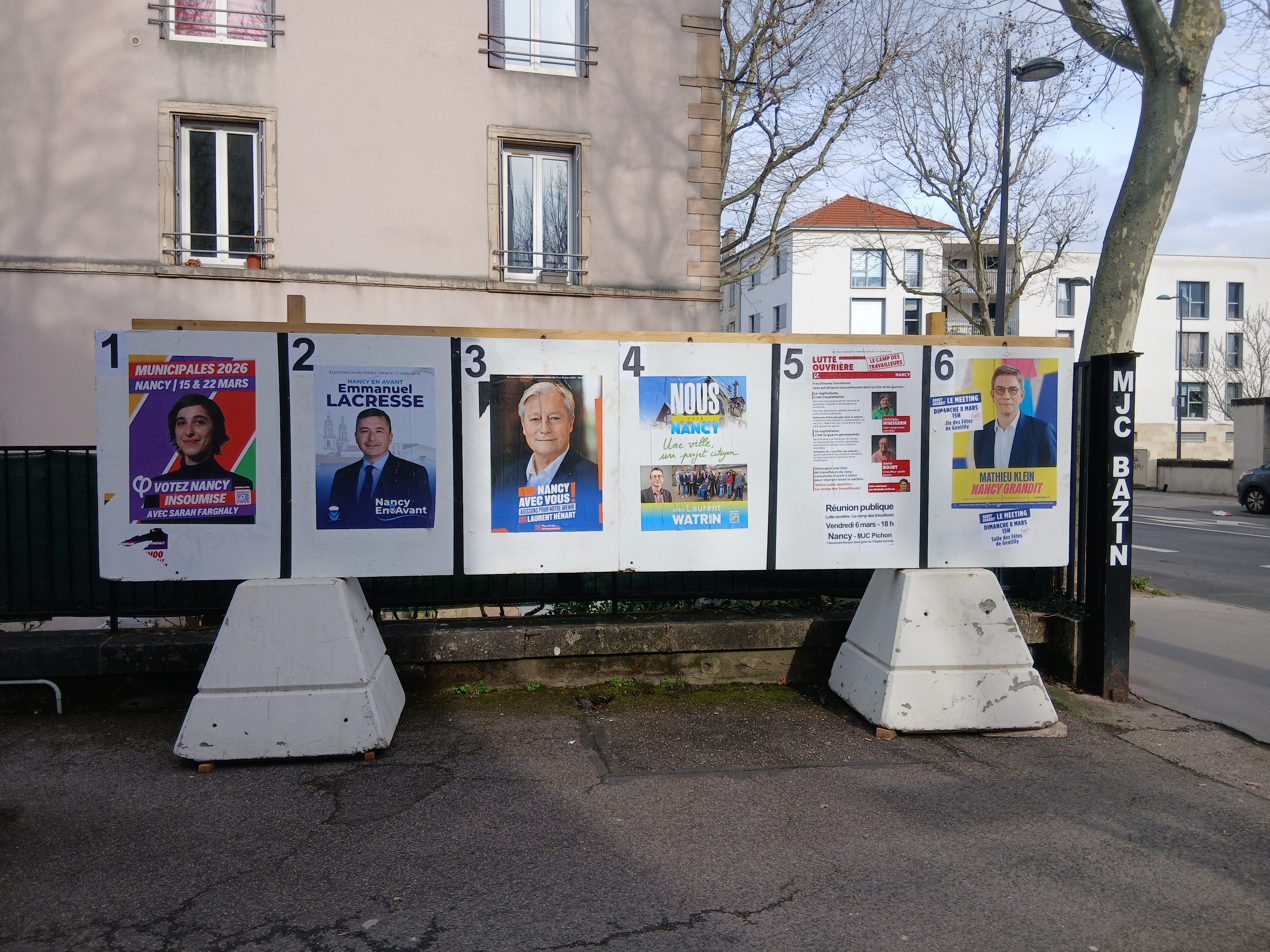
Election display in Nancy

In July 2024, Emmanuel Lacresse, former Renaissance Member of Parliament for Meurthe-et-Moselle's 2nd constituency until his defeat in 2024, announced his candidacy for mayor of Nancy with the slogan "Nancy Forward!" On 22 December, the Horizons party endorsed Laurent Hénart, former mayor of the city from 2014 to 2020 and president of the Radical Party, even though he had not yet officially declared his candidacy. On 10 January 2026, The Republicans, through Nadine Morano and Jean-François Husson, and despite having initially announced their support for Valérie Debord, also endorsed the list headed by Laurent Hénart. Husson announced that he would declare whether he would run again in the municipal campaign on 24 January. On 23 January 2026, Renaissance also endorsed Laurent Hénart. Emmanuel Lacresse, however, decided to maintain his candidacy. The MoDem party also endorsed Laurent Hénart's list.

On 12 November 2025, La France Insoumise announced its lead candidate Sarah Farghaly with the list name "Nancy Unbowed". On the same day, Place publique announced its support for the candidacy of the outgoing Socialist mayor, Mathieu Klein, even though he had not yet officially declared his candidacy. Klein officially declared his candidacy for re-election with the "Nancy Grandit" list on 17 January 2026, having obtained the other support of the Socialist Party, the Ecologists, the French Communist Party and the Radical Party of the Left. On 9 January 2026, Lutte Ouvrière invested Christiane Nimsgern. On 10 February 2026, Laurent Watrin, deputy mayor and candidate in 2020 under the banner of The Ecologists, rejected by this party, announced that he is running with the list "Nous Nancy 2026".

== Results ==
Results of the 2026 municipal elections in Nancy
Top of the list	List	First round		Second round		Seats	
Top of the list	List	Votes	%	Votes	%	CM	CC
Mathieu Klein	PS - LE - PCF - PP - PRG	12,424	43.11	14,353	49.68	42	25
Nancy grandit		12,424	43.11	14,353	49.68	42	25
Laurent Hénart	PR - LR - HOR - RE - MoDem	9,633	33.43	11,482	39.74	11	7
Nancy avec vous		9,633	33.43	11,482	39.74	11	7
Sarah Farghaly	LFI	3,410	11.83	3,056	10.58	2	1
Nancy insoumise		3,410	11.83	3,056	10.58	2	1
Emmanuel Lacresse	RE diss.	2,085	7.23				
Nancy en avant		2,085	7.23				
Laurent Watrin	DIV - LE diss.	898	3.12				
Nous Nancy 2026		898	3.12				
Christiane Nimsgern	LO	369	1.28				
Lutte ouvrière - Le camp des travailleurs		369	1.28				
Total		29401	100	29,497	100	55	39
Valid votes		28,819	98.02	28,891	97.95		
Blank votes		386	1.31	384	1.30		
Invalid votes		196	0.67	222	0.75		
Abstention		27,002	47.87	26,915	47.71		
Registered / participating		56,403	52.13	56,412	52.29		

== See also ==
- Municipal elections in France
- 2026 French municipal elections
  - 2026 Lyon municipal election
  - 2026 Marseille municipal election
  - 2026 Nice municipal election
  - 2026 Paris municipal election
  - 2026 Toulouse municipal election
