= 2026 Lyon municipal election =

- 15 March 2026 (first round); 22 March 2026 (second round)

All 73 members of the Municipal Council 37 seats needed for a majority
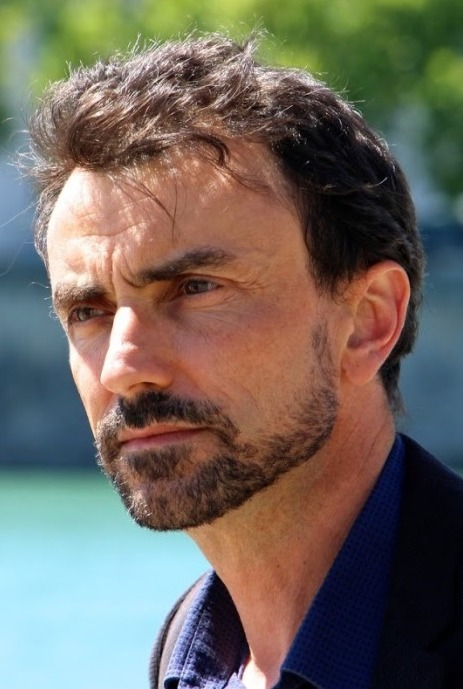

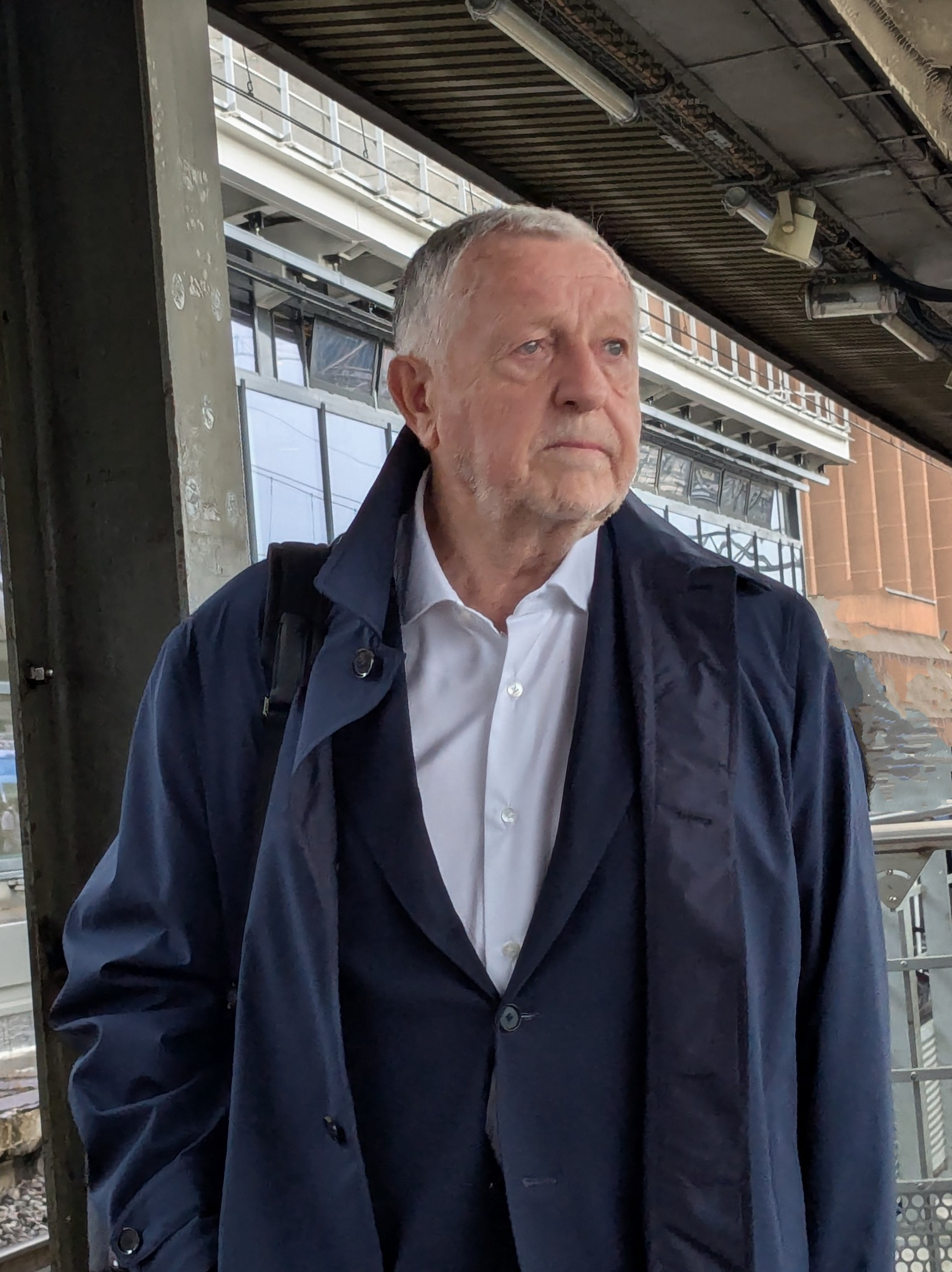
	First party	Second party
Candidate	Grégory Doucet	Jean-Michel Aulas
Party	LÉ–EELV	DVC
Last election	51 seats	22 seats (Note: Includes parties that ran separately in the 2020 election.)
Seats won	46	27
Seat change	▼5	▲5
Popular vote	76,318	75,134
Percentage	37.36%	36.78%
Popular vote (2nd)	104,702	101,940
Percentage (2nd)	50.67%	49.33%
- Results by arrondissement
Mayor before election
Grégory Doucet
LÉ–EELV
Elected Mayor
Grégory Doucet
LÉ–EELV

The 2026 Lyon municipal election was held on 15 March 2026, with a runoff on 22 March, to elect the 73 members of the Municipal Council of Lyon, and the nine arrondissement councils. The municipal council subsequently elected the mayor of Lyon, while the arrondissement councils elected their respective mayors. This election followed the first term of Grégory Doucet, who had been in office since 2020 and sought reelection. The race was widely regarded as highly competitive, with Jean-Michel Aulas initially seen as the front-runner.

In the second round, Grégory Doucet was reelected mayor, securing a second term in office.

== Background ==
The 2020 municipal elections were marked by the COVID-19 pandemic, which led to a sharp decline in voter turnout. Participation in the first round fell from 56% in 2014 to 39% in 2020. The election resulted in the victory of Ecologist Grégory Doucet.

After leading in the first round, The Ecologists merged with all other left-wing parties in the second round, facing the candidates of La République en marche and The Republicans. This coalition secured an absolute majority of the vote and won seven of the nine arrondissement councils.

Ahead of the subsequent election, divisions emerged within the governing majority. Anaïs Belouassa-Cherifi, a member of La France Insoumise who had initially been part of Doucet’s majority, announced her candidacy against the incumbent mayor.

On the right, Pierre Oliver was initially selected as the candidate of The Republicans. However, an agreement was later reached between Jean-Michel Aulas, Oliver, and Laurent Wauquiez, under which The Republicans endorsed Aulas as their mayoral candidate, while he incorporated LR members into his list. Aulas also secured the support of Renaissance and Horizons.

The National Rally chose to support Alexandre Dupalais, a member of the Union of the Right for the Republic.

== Electoral system ==
Under the 2025 PLM law, from 2026 onward, people cast two ballots, one for the Municipal Council of Lyon, and one for the arrondissement councils, each of which is presided over by a mayor.

The election was conducted using a two-round list system with a majority bonus. A list that obtains an absolute majority in the first round is elected outright. If no list achieves a majority, a second round is held on the following Sunday. Lists that receive at least 10% of the vote in the first round may participate in the second round, while lists receiving between 5% and 10% may merge with qualifying lists.

Arrondissement councils and the Municipal Council elect their mayors during the first plenary session. The mayor is chosen by majority vote in the first two rounds, or by plurality in the third round. In the event of a tie, the oldest candidate is elected.

== Candidates ==
=== The Ecologists ===
- Grégory Doucet, incumbent mayor

Doucet was also supported by PS, PCF and PP.

=== Miscellaneous centre ===
- Jean-Michel Aulas, former president of Olympique Lyonnais

Aulas was also supported by LR, RE, HOR, UDI and MoDem.

=== La France Insoumise ===
- Anaïs Belouassa-Cherifi, Deputy

=== Union of the Right for the Republic ===
- Alexandre Dupalais

Dupalais was also supported by RN.

== Campaign ==
The campaign was marked by the killing of Quentin Deranque, a far-right activist, who died on 14 February 2026 after being assaulted during clashes with antifascist militants on the sidelines of a conference by MEP Rima Hassan (LFI) at the Institut d'études politiques de Lyon.

The incident prompted widespread reactions across the political spectrum, including from Emmanuel Macron. Several mayoral candidates, including Jean-Michel Aulas, Alexandre Dupalais (RN), and Anaïs Belouassa-Cherifi (LFI), announced a temporary suspension of their campaigns following the news of his death. Jean-Michel Aulas urged the incumbent mayor to display the deceased activist’s portrait on the façade of City Hall. The main candidates also took part in several televised debates ahead of the first round. However, only one debate was attended by Jean-Michel Aulas, who was either replaced or declined to participate in the others.

Between the first and second round, the LFI merged its list with Doucet's.

== Polling ==

=== First round ===
Polling firm	Fieldwork date	Sample size	Briday LO	Mizony NPA-R	Belouassa-Cherifi LFI	Doucet LE	Perrin-Gilbert DVG	Képénékian DVC	Aulas DVD	Dupalais UDR	Others
Cluster17	16-19 Feb 2026	793	0.5%	0.5%	9%	31%	3%	4%	42%	9%	1%
Elabe	11-19 Feb 2026	800	1%	1%	10%	29%	3%	7%	43%	6%	—
OpinionWay	11-18 Feb 2026	943	<1%	<1%	9%	32%	3%	4%	45%	7%	—
Ifop	3-16 Feb 2026	804	<0.5	0.5	11%	29%	2.5%	6%	45%	6%	—
OpinionWay	9-13 Feb 2026	605	1%	<1%	9%	30%	2%	2%	47%	9%	—
Ipsos	13-27 Jan 2026	603	—	—	8%	30%	4%	5%	44%	8%	1%
OpinionWay	12-19 Jan 2026	605	<1%	3%	8%	25%	3%	4%	47%	10%	—
OpinionWay	8-12 Dec 2025	600	<1%	2%	9%	25%	4%	4%	46%	10%	—
Ifop	1-5 Nov 2025	809	—	—	9%	27%	4%	7%	47%	6%	—
OpinionWay	15-20 Oct 2025	602	1%	—	10%	24%	7%	3%	47%	8%	—
Verian	17-30 Sep 2025	816	—	—	15%	23%	7%	—	47%	8%	—

=== Second round ===
Polling firm	Fieldwork date	Sample size	Belouassa-Cherifi LFI	Doucet LE	Aulas DVD	Dupalais UDR
Elabe	11-19 Feb 2026	800	11%	34%	55%	—
Elabe	11-19 Feb 2026	800	—	43%	57%	—
OpinionWay	11-18 Feb 2026	943	—	45%	55%	—
Ifop	3-16 Feb 2026	804	—	40%	52%	8%
Ifop	3-16 Feb 2026	804	—	42%	58%	—
OpinionWay	9-13 Feb 2026	605	—	40%	52%	8%
OpinionWay	9-13 Feb 2026	605	—	42%	58%	—
OpinionWay	12-19 Jan 2026	605	—	37%	53%	10%
OpinionWay	8-12 Dec 2025	600	—	40%	60%	—
Ifop	1-5 Nov 2025	809	—	39%	61%	—
Verian	17-30 Sep 2025	816	—	39%	61%	—

== Results ==
Candidate	Party	First round		Second round		Seats	
Candidate	Party	Votes	%	Votes	%	Nb.	+/-
Grégory Doucet	LE-PS-PCF-PP-L'A-D!-G.s-GRS	76,318	37.36%	104,702	50,67%	46	−5
Anaïs Belouassa-Cherifi	LFI	21,273	10.41%	104,702	50,67%	46	−5
Jean-Michel Aulas	DVC-LR-RE-HOR-UDI-MoDem-LC-PA	75,134	36.78%	101,940	49,33%	27	+5
Alexandre Dupalais	UDR-RN-RPR	14,451	7.07%	—		0	0
Nathalie Perrin-Gilbert	DVG-PRG-MRC-PP	7,426	3.64%	—		0	0
Georges Képénékian	DVC-EQX-EC-Volt	7,214	3.53%	—		0	0
Delphine Briday	LO	1,082	0.53%	—		0	0
Raphaëlle Mizony	NPA-R	1,041	0.51%	—		0	0
Michaël Jouteux	PT	320	0.16%	—		0	0
Registered voters			100,00	321,188	100,00		
Abstention				109,006	33,94		
Total votes				212,182	66,06		
Blank or invalid votes				5,540	2,61		
Valid votes				206,642			

=== Results by arrondissement ===
Doucet won six arrondissements of nine, while Aulas led in the remaining three. Doucet performed the best in the 1st arrondisement in the centre of Lyon with 68.6% of the vote; it was also where the least total votes were cast. Conversely, Aulas secured his best result in the 6th arrondissement, with 65.9% of the vote.

Arron.	Grégory Doucet LÉ–EELV		Jean-Michel Aulas DVC		Total
Arron.	#	%	#	%	Total
1st	9,322	68.6%	4,271	31.4%	13,593
2nd	6,031	41.2%	8,618	58.8%	14,649
3rd	21,554	52.4%	19 546	47.6%	41,100
4th	10,055	55.3%	8,125	44.7%	18,180
5th	7,563	38.1%	12,275	61.9%	19,838
6th	8,285	34.1%	16,010	65.9%	24,295
7th	20,383	62.3%	12,336	37.7%	32,719
8th	12,838	50.5%	12,589	49.5%	25,427
9th	8,671	51.5%	8,170	48.5%	16,841

== Arrondissement mayors ==

Arrondissement	Outgoing mayor	Party	Elected mayor	Party	Votes
Lyon	Grégory Doucet	LE	Grégory Doucet	LE	50.67%
1st	Yasmine Bouagga	LE	Yasmine Bouagga	LE	68.79%
2nd	Pierre Oliver	LR	Pierre Oliver	LR	59.80%
3rd	Marion Sessiecq	LE	Marion Sessiecq	LE	52.48%
4th	Rémi Zinck	LE	Rémi Zinck	LE	55.19%
5th	Nadine Georgel	LE	Thomas Rudigoz	RE	50.38%
6th	Pascal Blache*	HOR	Samuel Soulier	DVD	51.50%
7th	Fanny Dubot	LE	Fanny Dubot	LE	62.76%
8th	Olivier Berzane	LE	Olivier Berzane	LE	49.97%
9th	Anne Braibant*	LE	Emmanuel Giraud	PS	51.32%
*not running for re-election

== See also ==
- 2026 French municipal elections
  - 2026 Marseille municipal election
  - 2026 Metropolitan Council of Lyon election
  - 2026 Nancy municipal election
  - 2026 Nice municipal election
  - 2026 Paris municipal election
  - 2026 Toulouse municipal election
