= Grégory Doucet =

French politician (born 1973)

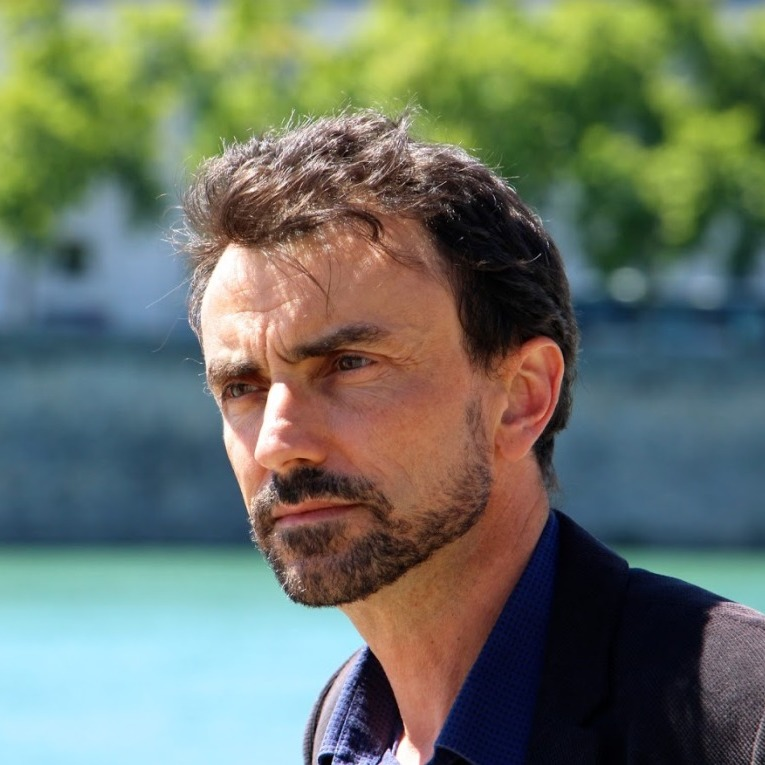

Mayor of Lyon
- Incumbent
- Assumed office 4 July 2020
- Preceded by: Gérard Collomb

Personal details
- Born: Grégory Pascal Doucet; 22 August 1973 (age 53) Paris, France
- Party: The Ecologists (since 2010)
- Other political affiliations: The Greens (2007–2010)
- Education: Rouen Business School

Grégory Pascal Doucet (French: [ɡʁeɡɔʁi dusɛ]; born 22 August 1973) is a French humanitarian and politician who has served as Mayor of Lyon and a member of the Metropolitan Council of Lyon since 2020. He is a member of The Ecologists (LE), formerly Europe Ecology – The Greens (EELV).

== Career ==
A humanitarian by occupation, Doucet was 27th on the list headed by Yannick Jadot in the 2019 European Parliament election in France.

=== Mayor of Lyon ===
On 12 September 2019, he was chosen in an internal primary to lead the Europe Ecology – The Greens list in Lyon in the 2020 municipal election, in which it received an absolute majority of the vote with 52.4% in the second round, defeating the lists led by Yann Cucherat of La République En Marche! and former Mayor Georges Képénékian. It placed first in seven of the nine arrondissements in the second round; Doucet stood as a candidate in the 3rd arrondissement.

Elected to the mayorship by the municipal council of Lyon on 4 July 2020, he became the first member of his party to assume the office. He is also a councillor of the Metropolis of Lyon, where he sits on the Committee on Finance, Institutions, Resources and Territorial Organisation.

In February 2026, following the death of activist Quentin Daranque after political clashes, Doucet condemned the violence and called for calm. He however declined the proposal to display Daranque's portrait at Lyon City Hall, stating that he did not consider it representative of Lyon's humanist values. He also called for the national government to assess the public order risks of a planned memorial march, which went without major issues.

In the 2026 Lyon municipal election, Doucet allied himself with the Socialist Party, French Communist Party and Place Publique ahead of the first round. In the second round he narrowly defeated Jean-Michel Aulas, supported by The Republicans, Renaissance (formerly La République En Marche!), Horizons and the Democratic Movement, with 50.6% of the vote.
