= Meurthe-et-Moselle's 2nd constituency =

Constituency of the National Assembly of France

2nd constituency of Meurthe-et-Moselle
- inline Constituency of the National Assembly of France

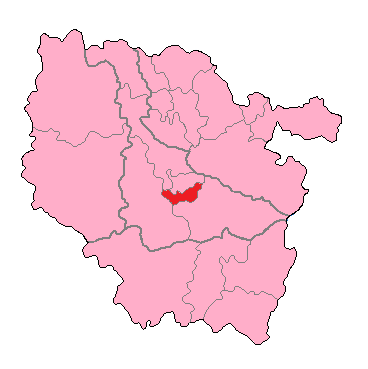
- Meurthe-et-Moselle's 2nd Constituency shown within Lorraine
- Deputy: Stéphane Hablot; PS
- Department: Meurthe-et-Moselle
- Cantons: Jarville-la-Malgrange, Laxou, Nancy-Ouest, Vandœuvre-lès-Nancy-Est, Vandœuvre-lès-Nancy-Ouest
- Registered voters: 70,929

The 2nd constituency of Meurthe-et-Moselle is a French legislative constituency in the Meurthe-et-Moselle département.

== Description ==
Meurthe-et-Moselle's 2nd constituency contains the western part of Nancy as well as the large commuter suburb of Vandœuvre-lès-Nancy.

The seat is marginal but was held by Hervé Feron of the Socialist Party until 2017.

== Historic Representation ==
Election	Member	Party
1986	Proportional representation – no election by constituency	
1988	Gérard Léonard	RPR
1993	Gérard Léonard	RPR
1997	René Mangin	PS
2002	Gérard Léonard	UMP
2007	Hervé Feron	PS
2012	Hervé Feron	PS
2017	Laurent Garcia	MoDem
2022	Emmanuel Lacresse	MoDem
2024	Stéphane Hablot	PS

== Election results ==
=== 2024 ===
Legislative Election 2024: Meurthe-et-Moselle's 2nd constituency
Party	Candidate	Votes	%	±%
LR	Sloane Fromont	2,325	5.15	N/A
LO	Odile Destombes	365	0.81	N/A
PS (NFP)	Stéphane Hablot	18,008	39.91	+3.32
RN	Geneviève Maillot	10,131	22.45	+9.06
REC	Lucy Georges	422	0.94	−3.47
RE (Ensemble)	Emmanuel Lacresse	13,869	30.74	N/A
Turnout		45,120	98.33	+48.48
Registered electors		67,916		
2nd round result
PS	Stéphane Hablot	20,588	45.17	+5.26
RE	Emmanuel Lacresse	14,284	31.34	+0.60
RN	Geneviève Maillot	10,709	23.49	+1.04
Turnout		45,581	97.92	−0.41
Registered electors		67,925		
PS gain from MoDem				

=== 2022 ===
Legislative Election 2022: Meurthe-et-Moselle's 2nd constituency
Party	Candidate	Votes	%	±%
PS (NUPÉS)	Stéphane Hablot	12,101	36.59	+10.74
MoDem (Ensemble)	Emmanuel Lacresse	10,448	31.60	-11.06
RN	Olivier Maillot	4,427	13.39	+4.02
LC (UDC)	Vincent Manfredi	2,753	8.33	−8.42
REC	Anselme Boussuge	1,457	4.41	N/A
Others	N/A	1,882	-	−
Turnout		33,068	49.85	−1.71
2nd round result
MoDem (Ensemble)	Emmanuel Lacresse	15,689	50.26	-16.56
PS (NUPÉS)	Stéphane Hablot	15,524	49.74	N/A
Turnout		31,213	48.88	+5.48
MoDem hold				

=== 2017 ===
Candidate	Label	First round		Second round	
Candidate	Label	Votes	%	Votes	%
Laurent Garcia	MoDem	14,871	42.66	17,487	66.82
Valérie Debord	LR	5,839	16.75	8,684	33.18
Hervé Féron	PS	4,881	14.00		
Nassima Faïq	FI	3,508	10.06		
Grégoire Eury	FN	3,268	9.37		
Danièle Vatrey	ECO	677	1.94		
Bora Yilmaz	PCF	624	1.79		
Lionel Chambrot	ECO	416	1.19		
Patricia Schlater	DLF	398	1.14		
Monique Etchevest	DIV	195	0.56		
Jacques Lacreuse	EXG	184	0.53		
Julien Gniadek	DIV	0	0.00		
Votes		34,861	100.00	26,171	100.00
Valid votes		34,861	98.55	26,171	87.89
Blank votes		377	1.07	2,755	9.25
Null votes		135	0.38	850	2.85
Turnout		35,373	51.56	29,776	43.40
Abstentions		33,227	48.44	38,825	56.60
Registered voters		68,600		68,601	
Source: Ministry of the Interior

=== 2012 ===
Legislative Election 2012: Meurthe-et-Moselle's 2nd constituency
Party	Candidate	Votes	%	±%
PS	Hervé Feron	15,976	39.51	
UMP	Valérie Rosso-Debord	13,574	33.57	
FN	Nathalie Repusseau	4,010	9.92	
MoDem	Marc Saint-Denis	1,787	4.42	
FG	Pierre Hanegreefs	1,668	4.13	
EELV	Patricia Cartigny	1,223	3.02	
Others	N/A	2,193		
Turnout		40,431	57.00	
2nd round result
PS	Hervé Feron	21,803	54.15	
UMP	Valérie Rosso-Debord	18,458	45.85	
Turnout		40,261	56.76	
PS hold				

== Sources ==
Official results of French elections from 2002: "Résultats électoraux officiels en France" (in French).
