= Laurent Garcia =

French politician (born 1970)

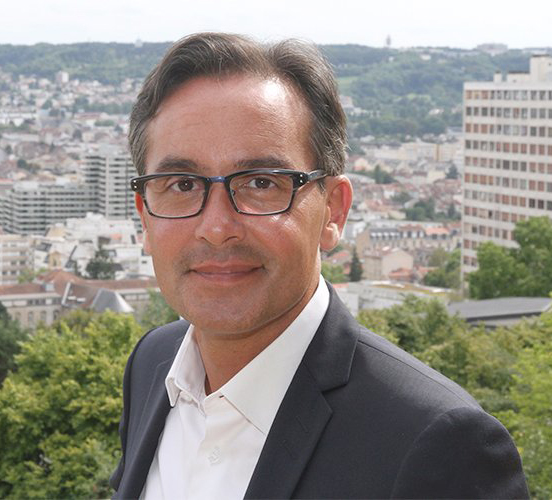

Member of the National Assembly for Meurthe-et-Moselle's 2nd constituency
- In office 21 June 2017 – 21 June 2022
- Preceded by: Hervé Féron
- Succeeded by: Emmanuel Lacresse

Personal details
- Born: 31 May 1970 (age 55) Paris, France
- Party: MoDem

Laurent Garcia (born 31 May 1970) is a French politician representing the Democratic Movement. He was elected to the French National Assembly on 18 June 2017, representing the department of Meurthe-et-Moselle.

Garcia was elected in 1990 as the head of the International League against Racism and Anti-Semitism in Meurthe-et-Moselle. He was also elected the mayor of Laxou in 2008 where he would remain until his election to the Assembly in 2017.

== Political career ==
Vice-president of the Metropole of Greater Nancy, he was elected mayor of Laxou, a suburb of Nancy, in 2008 (running against Claude Guillerme, whose deputy he was) and re-elected in 2014.

He has chaired the Ligue contre le racisme et l'antisémitisme de Meurthe-et-Moselle.

In 2017, he was nominated and supported by La République en marche as an independent candidate in the legislative elections for the second Meurthe-et-Moselle constituency. He was elected on June 18, 2017, defeating Valérie Debord (Les Républicains) in the second round, with 66.82% of the vote. He resigned from the mayor's office in Laxou as a result of the accumulation of mandates. At the French National Assembly, he is a member of the Mouvement démocrate et apparentés group and its spokesman.

A year after his election, L'Est républicain compiled a list of the hardest-working Lorraine MPs in the Chamber, based on various criteria such as attendance, speeches, proposed amendments and bills. Garcia was ranked 16th out of 21 deputies.

After two years as a member of parliament, Laurent Garcia returned to the mayor's office in Laxou. He ran in the municipal elections and was re-elected mayor on June 28, 2020, by a margin of 33 votes. Before the second round, he went door-to-door distributing masks in the commune, his status as a member of parliament allowing him to travel despite the health ban in force at the time. The outgoing mayor, Laurence Wieser, accused him of distorting the vote with this distribution, having taken advantage of his status as a member of parliament. Pending a decision by the courts, Laurent Garcia held both his deputy and mayor's posts, but renounced his mayor's salary. On January 21, 2021, the court rejected Laurence Wieser's protest, deeming her arguments inadmissible. Laurence Wieser appeals to the Conseil d'Etat.
