= Gérard Collomb =

French politician (1947–2023)

Gérard Collomb OQ
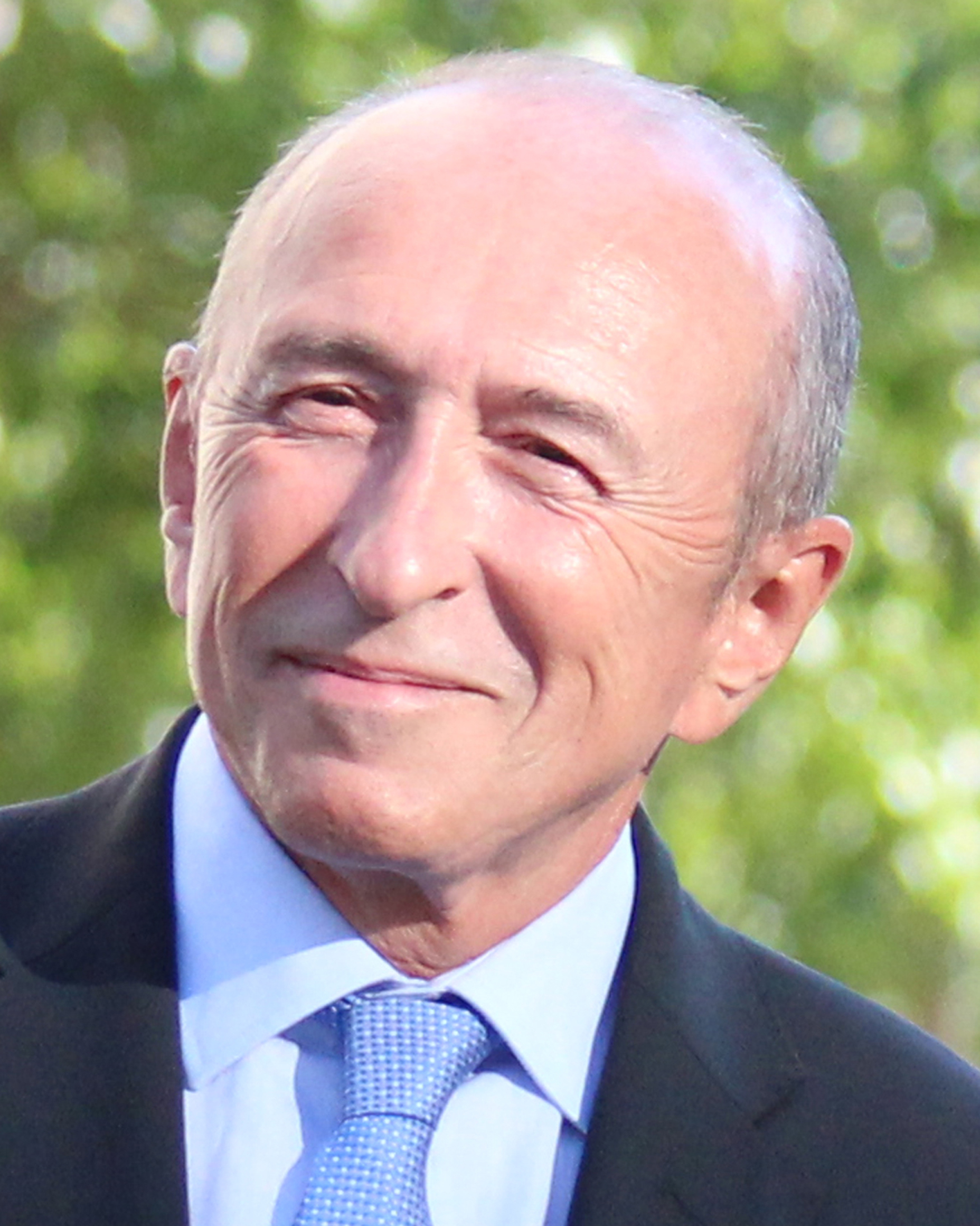
- Collomb in 2013

Minister of the Interior
- In office 17 May 2017 – 3 October 2018
- Prime Minister: Édouard Philippe
- Preceded by: Matthias Fekl
- Succeeded by: Édouard Philippe (ad interim); Christophe Castaner

President of Lyon Metropolis
- In office 1 January 2015 – 10 July 2017
- Preceded by: Position established
- Succeeded by: David Kimelfeld

Mayor of Lyon
- In office 5 November 2018 – 4 July 2020
- Preceded by: Georges Képénékian
- Succeeded by: Grégory Doucet
- In office 25 March 2001 – 17 July 2017
- Preceded by: Raymond Barre
- Succeeded by: Georges Képénékian

Senator for Rhône
- In office 4 November 2018 – 5 December 2018
- Preceded by: Gilbert-Luc Devinaz
- Succeeded by: Gilbert-Luc Devinaz
- In office 2 November 1999 – 17 June 2017
- Preceded by: Franck Sérusclat
- Succeeded by: Gilbert-Luc Devinaz

Mayor of the 9th arrondissement of Lyon
- In office 3 July 1995 – 25 March 2001
- Preceded by: Michèle Mollard
- Succeeded by: Pierrette Augier

Member of the National Assembly for Rhône
- In office 2 July 1981 – 4 May 1988
- Preceded by: Roger Fenech
- Succeeded by: Michel Noir
- Constituency: 2nd (1981–1986); At-large (1986–1988)

Personal details
- Born: Gérard Roland Collomb; 20 June 1947 Chalon-sur-Saône, France
- Died: 25 November 2023 (aged 76) Saint-Genis-Laval, France
- Party: LREM (2017–2022)
- Other political affiliations: CIR (1968–1971); PS (1969–2017)
- Education: Lycée du Parc
- Alma mater: University of Lyon

Gérard Roland Collomb OQ (French pronunciation: [ʒeʁaʁ kɔlɔ̃]; 20 June 1947 – 25 November 2023) was a French politician who served as Mayor of Lyon from 2001 to 2017 and again from 2018 until 2020. He joined La République En Marche! (LREM) in 2017, when he left the Socialist Party (PS), which he had joined in 1969. Collomb was Minister of the Interior in the first and second government of Prime Minister Édouard Philippe from 2017 to 2018. Disagreements with President Emmanuel Macron over immigration policy led him to resign and return as Mayor of Lyon. He was a councillor for both the City of Lyon and Metropolis of Lyon from 2020 until his death in 2023.

== Political career ==
=== Local politics ===
Collomb was elected as a Socialist municipal councillor for the 9th arrondissement of Lyon in the 1977 French municipal elections, and was re-elected six times since then. In 1981, aged 34, he was elected to the French National Assembly. He was re-elected in 1986 but lost his seat in 1988. From 1989 on, he led by the municipal opposition to Michel Noir on the Lyon municipal council. From 1992 to 1999 he also served as regional councillor for the Rhône-Alpes region, before his resignation.

Collomb was defeated in the 1995 local elections in Lyon, and became Mayor of the 9th arrondissement and vice-president of the Urban Community of Lyon, until 2001. He ran as leader of the Plural Left list in the 2001 local elections. He was elected Mayor on 25 March and also elected as president of the Urban Community of Lyon, a post he held until 2014. Among the projects he implemented was the Vélo'v.

In 2004, Collomb was re-elected Senator for the Rhône. He was re-elected as Mayor of Lyon by a large margin in March 2008, defeating Dominique Perben of the Union for a Popular Movement (UMP) in the first round by a landslide. He was re-elected again in 2014.

Ahead of the 2008 Reims Congress, Collomb led the "Hope on the left, proud to be Socialist" (French: L'espoir à gauche, fier(e)s d'être socialistes) motion of behalf of Ségolène Royal. He was a finalist for the 2010 World Mayor prize.

Collomb was President of the Metropolis of Lyon from 2015 to 2017. From 2017 until his death he was the councillor for the Metropolis of Lyon.

=== Career in national politics ===
Collomb was one of Emmanuel Macron's first close allies and vocal supporters among leading Socialists ahead of the 2017 presidential elections. On 17 May 2017, he was named Minister of the Interior in the Philippe Government. Lyon Deputy mayor Georges Képénékian was elected as Lyon mayor succeeding Collomb.

In October 2018, Collomb prevailed in resigning in order to run again for mayor of Lyon. He was quoted saying of Macron, "Very few of us can still talk to" him.

Collomb was "recently revealed to have said in private that France risked a civil war unless immigration, legal and illegal, was sharply curtailed within the next five years". As minister he had "talked about France being 'flooded' by immigrants—a term frequently used by" past National Rally presidential candidate Marine Le Pen. After touring parts of Marseille, Toulouse and Paris as minister, Collomb had said, "The situation is very difficult" and used the phrase "Reconquering the Republic" to frame the challenge facing the country.

== Death ==
Gérard Collomb died after a battle with stomach cancer on 25 November 2023 in the suburb of Lyon at the age of 76.

== Honours ==
Collomb was appointed an Officer of the Order of Quebec (OQ) in 2014, and an Officer of the Legion of Honour on 31 December 2021.

Collomb was appointed to the Order of the Rising Sun, second class (Gold and Silver Star) by the Japanese government in 2019, for his contributions towards Franco-Japanese relations.

Political offices
| Preceded by Matthias Fekl | Minister of the Interior; 2017–2018 | Succeeded by Édouard Philippe; Acting |
