= Emmanuel Lacresse =

French politician (born 1971)

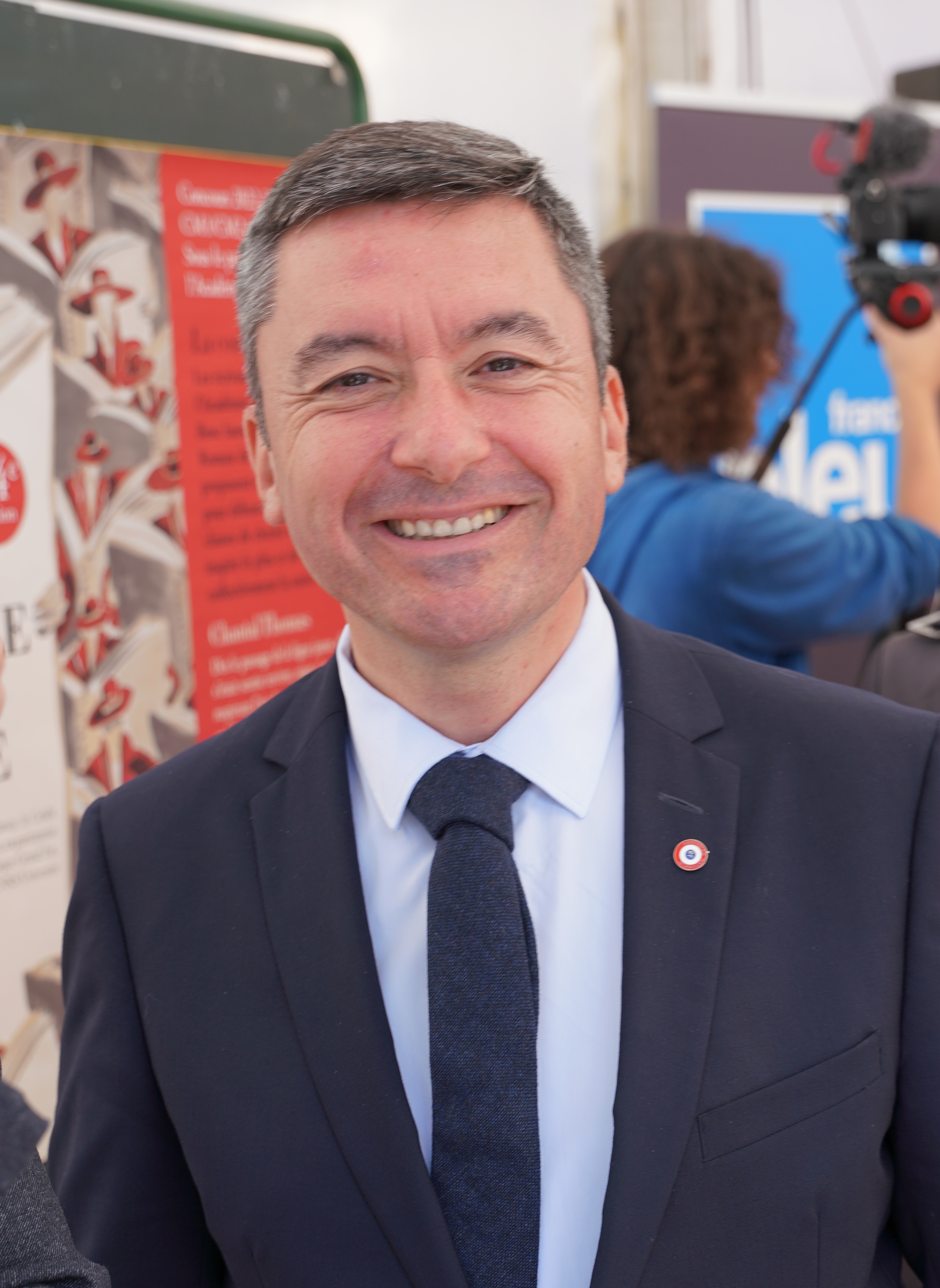

Member of the National Assembly for Meurthe-et-Moselle's 2nd constituency
- Incumbent
- Assumed office 22 June 2022
- Preceded by: Laurent Garcia

Personal details
- Born: 14 July 1971 (age 55) Laxou, Meurthe-et-Moselle, France
- Party: Renaissance
- Education: École nationale d'administration

Emmanuel Lacresse (born 14 July 1971) is a French politician of the Renaissance party who has been Member of Parliament for Meurthe-et-Moselle's 2nd constituency in the National Assembly since 2022.

== Political career ==
In parliament, Lacresse has since been serving on the Finance Committee.

In addition to his committee assignments, Lacresse is part of the French delegation to the Franco-German Parliamentary Assembly and the French parliamentary friendship groups with the United Kingdom, Saudi Arabia and Oman. According to the Uber Files, he is perceived by lobbyists for the American company Uber as a privileged interlocutor likely to help it beyond its "official attributions". On this subject, on July 11, 2022, Emmanuel Lacresse declared to the newspaper Le Monde that "Emmanuel Macron's political line as Minister of the Economy has always been constant, public and clear, on Uber as on other innovative companies: to promote the development of new services for the French and support the transformation of economic sectors disrupted by innovations". He denies any intervention on Uber's behalf: "The Minister has never intervened in any legal proceedings whatsoever concerning Uber. Nor have instructions been given to the DGCCRF (Direction Générale de la Concurrence, de la Consommation et de la Répression des Fraudes) specifically concerning Uber.

Lacresse was a candidate for mayor in the 2026 Nancy municipal election.

== See also ==
- List of deputies of the 16th National Assembly of France
