= Jean-Michel Aulas =

French businessman and politician (born 1949)

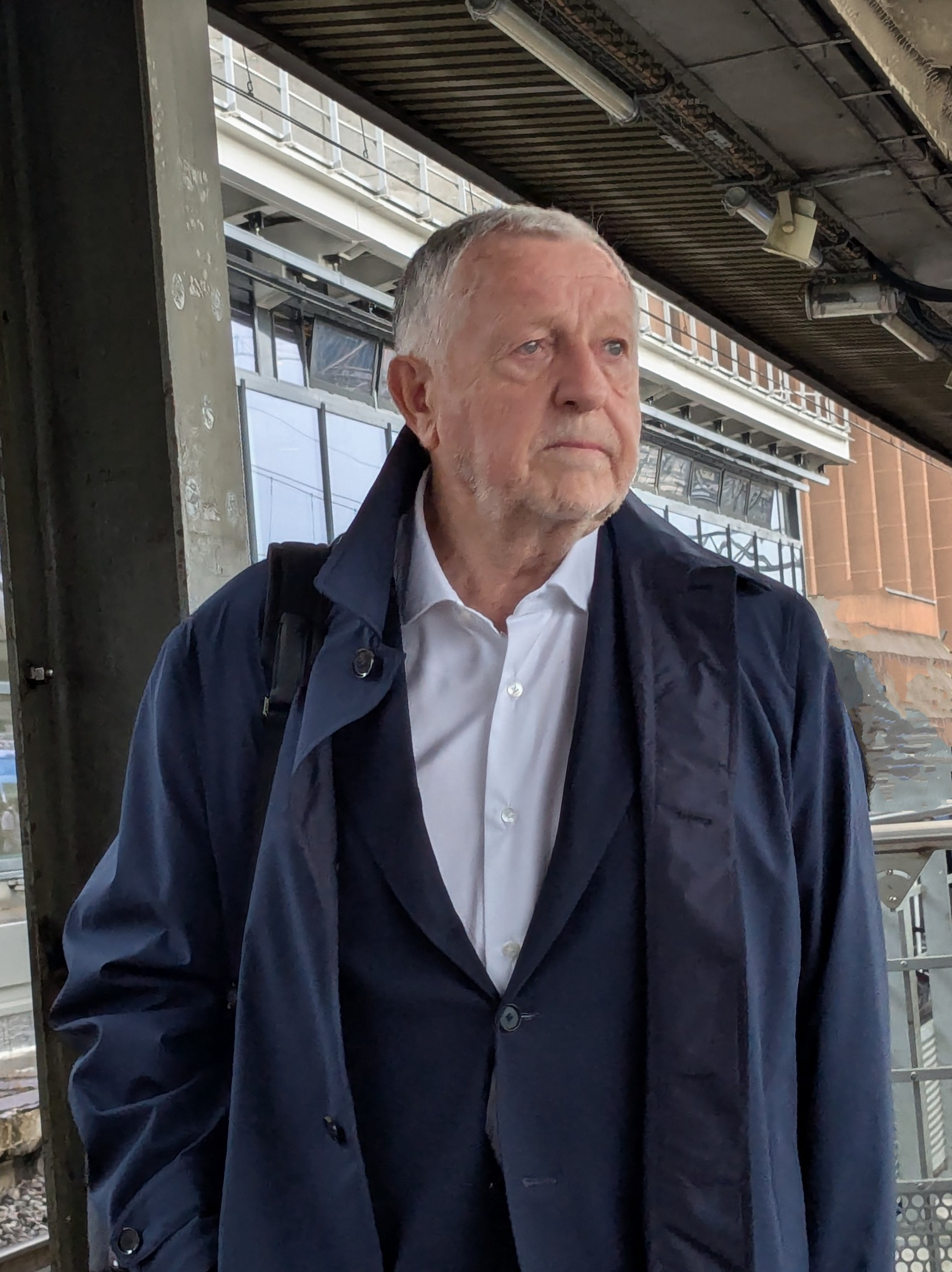
- Aulas in 2025

President of the Ligue féminine de football professionnel
- Incumbent
- Assumed office 1 July 2024
- Preceded by: Office established

Vice President of the French Football Federation
- Incumbent
- Assumed office 16 December 2023
- President: Philippe Diallo
- Preceded by: Philippe Diallo

President of the Olympique Lyonnais
- In office 15 June 1987 – 9 May 2023
- Preceded by: Charles Mighirian
- Succeeded by: John Textor

Personal details
- Born: Jean-Michel Antoine Aulas; 22 March 1949 (age 77) L'Arbresle, France
- Children: 1
- Education: Lycée La Martinière Monplaisir
- Occupation: Businessman • Sports manager • Politician
- Awards: Légion d'honneur (2017); Ordre national du Mérite (2022)

Jean-Michel Antoine Aulas (French pronunciation: [ʒɑ̃miʃɛl olas]; born 22 March 1949) is a French businessman and politician. He is the founder of Cegid (Compagnie Européenne de Gestion par l'Informatique Décentralisée), and from 1987 to 2023, he served as the president of French football club Lyon, which he had owned from 1987 to 2022 before selling a majority stake to John Textor. As part of OL Groupe, Aulas also previously owned and was the chairman of American club OL Reign from 2020 to 2022.

Aulas was the last president of the prestigious G-14 until it was disbanded in January 2008, and he also served on the board of the European Club Association for Lyon until 2023. In 2023, his net worth was estimated at €450 million.

He was a candidate for mayor of Lyon in the 2026 Lyon municipal election, failing to deny incumbent Grégory Doucet a second term in office. Instead, he became first vice president of the Metropolis of Lyon on 26 March 2026.

== Olympique Lyonnais ==
On 15 June 1987, Aulas took control of Lyon and invested in the club with the objective of turning Lyon into an established Ligue 1 side. His ambitious plan, titled OL – Europe, was designed to develop the club on the European level and back into the first division within a time-frame of no more than four years. After ridding the club of its debt, Aulas restructured the club's management and reorganized the finances and, in a span of two decades, transformed the club from a second division team into one of the richest football clubs in the world. Under Aulas's leadership, Lyon won their first ever Ligue 1 championship in 2002 and promptly started a then national-record streak of seven successive titles. Lyon have also won one Coupe de France and Coupe de la Ligue title each, as well as a record six Trophée des Champions titles. The club have appeared in the UEFA Champions League eleven times under Aulas, reaching the semi-finals of the competition twice, in the 2009-10 and 2019-20 seasons.

After establishing Lyon as a contender in French football, Aulas adopted a strategy which allowed the club to acquire many of the top players of other clubs in Ligue 1. After excelling at the club, the chairman would then sell the players for exorbitant fees to clubs abroad. His complex style of negotiating has led to the successful transfers of many former Lyon players such as Michael Essien, Mahamadou Diarra, Karim Benzema, Florent Malouda, Eric Abidal, and Tiago Mendes with all the players departing the club for transfer fees as low as €15 million (Tiago) and as high as €38 million (Essien). On the negative side, Aulas has been lambasted for, according to critics, running the club as if it were a business. The club currently operates on the European Stock Exchange under the name OL Groupe, initialed OLG.

In April 2008, business magazine Forbes ranked Lyon as the thirteenth most valuable football team in the world. The magazine valued the club at $408 million (€368 m), excluding debt. On 12 February 2009, accountants Deloitte released their annual Deloitte Football Money League. In the report, Lyon was in the twelfth spot among football clubs in terms of revenue, reportedly bringing in an annual revenue of €155.7 million for the 2007–08 season.

== Honours ==
Orders

- Knight of the National Order of Merit: 1986
- Knight of the Legion of Honour: 2006
- Officer of the National Order of Merit: 2012
- Officer of the Legion of Honour: 2016
- Commander of the National Order of Merit: 2022
