= 2026 Nice municipal election =

- 15 March 2026 (first round); 22 March 2026 (second round)

All 69 members of the Municipal Council 35 seats needed for a majority
- Turnout: 53.58% (first round) ▲25.04 pp 55.92% (second round) ▲28.20 pp
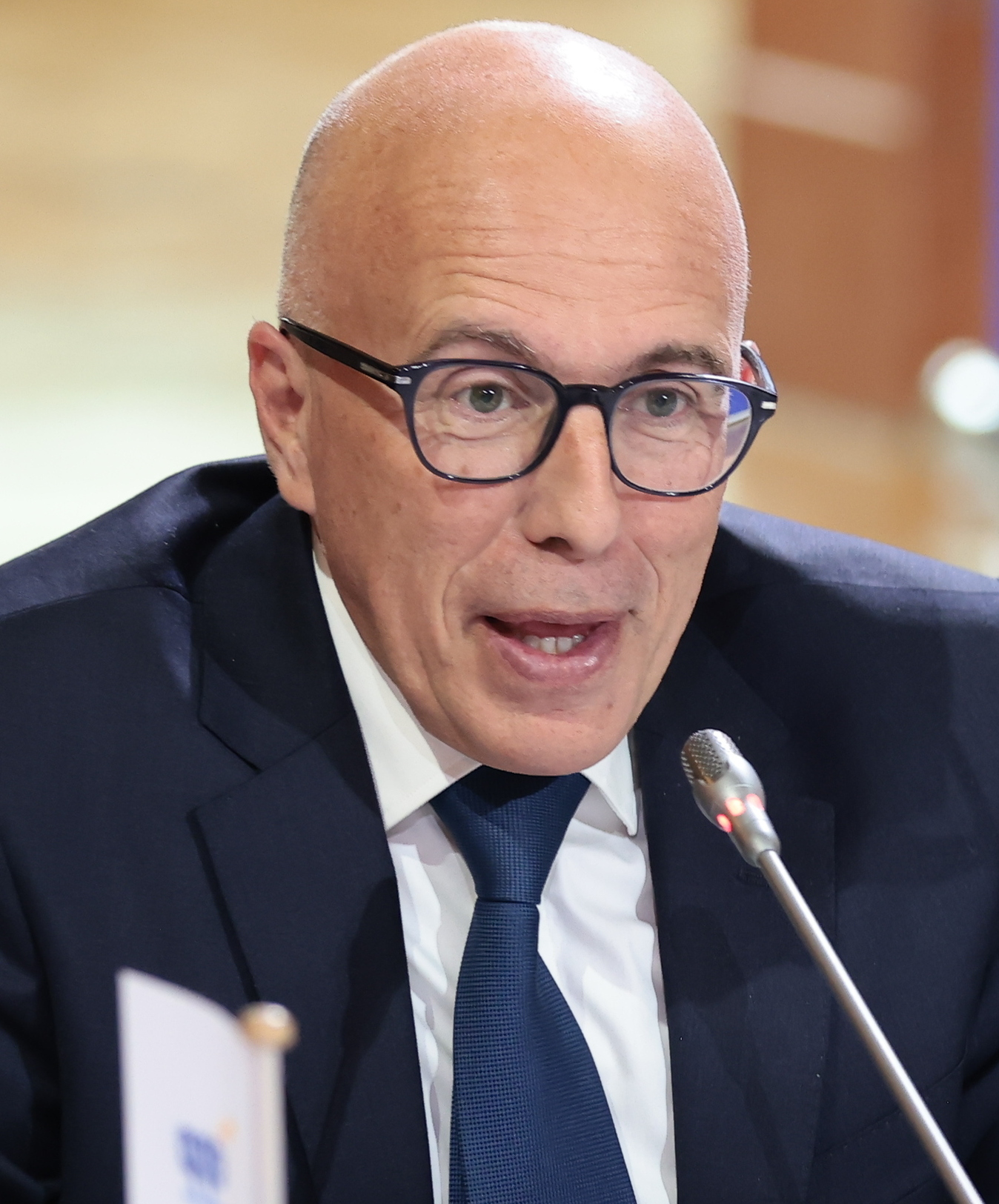

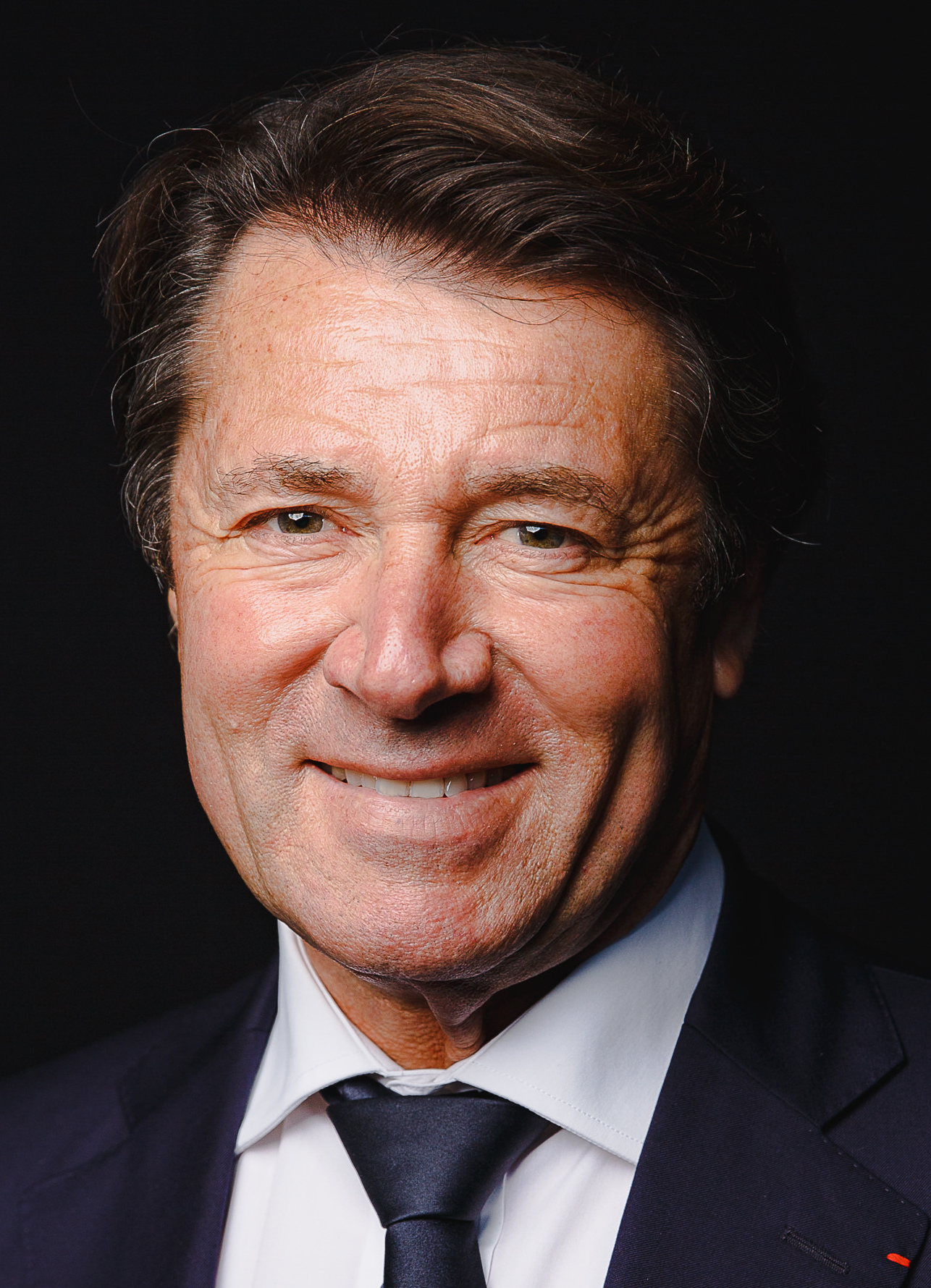

	First party	Second party
Candidate	Éric Ciotti	Christian Estrosi
Party	UDR	HOR
Alliance	Endorsed by: National Rally; Ecology at the Centre; New Energy; Union of Democrats and Independents	Endorsed by: The Republicans
Last election	21.39%, 7 seats	59.30%, 56 seats
Seats won	52	13
Seat change	▲45	▼43
Popular vote	52,274	37,214
Percentage	43.43%	30.92%
Popular vote (2nd)	61,009	46,753
Percentage (2nd)	48.54%	37.20%
	Third party
Candidate	Juliette Chesnel-Le Roux
Party	LÉ–EELV
Alliance	Endorsed by: Socialist Party; French Communist Party
Last election	19.30%, 6 seats
Seats won	4
Seat change	▼2
Popular vote	14,356
Percentage	11.93%
Popular vote (2nd)	17,926
Percentage (2nd)	14.26%
Mayor before election
Christian Estrosi
HOR
Elected Mayor
Éric Ciotti
UDR

The 2026 Nice municipal election was held on 15 March 2026, with a runoff on 22 March to elect the mayor of Nice and the 69 members of the Municipal Council of Nice. Incumbent mayor Christian Estrosi, who had served as mayor since returning to office in 2017 and sought a fourth nonconsecutive term. The election was the first municipal election in which Estrosi faced his former deputy Éric Ciotti, who left The Republicans (LR) in 2024 to found the Union of the Right for the Republic (UDR).

The main candidates were Christian Estrosi of Horizons (HOR), his former deputy Éric Ciotti of the Union of the Right for the Republic (UDR), Juliette Chesnel-Le Roux of The Ecologists (LE), and several other candidates. Ciotti finished first in the first round with 43.43% of the vote, followed by Estrosi with 30.92% and Chesnel-Le Roux with 11.93%, with all three advancing to the runoff.

In the second round, Ciotti received 48.54% of the vote and his list won 52 of the 69 seats on the Municipal Council. Estrosi received 37.20% and won 13 seats, while Chesnel-Le Roux received 14.26% and won the remaining four seats.

== Background ==
Christian Estrosi was elected as mayor in 2008 and reelected in 2014 and in 2020, with an interruption between 2016 and 2017, when he was presiding over the Regional Council of Provence-Alpes-Côte d'Azur. He was a member of The Republicans (LR), but quit the party in 2021 to join Horizons (HOR). He ran for a second term against his former deputy Éric Ciotti, who quit LR in 2024 after allying with the National Rally (RN). Ciotti was supported in his candidacy by his new party, the Union of the Right for the Republic (UDR), but also by the RN. On 17 December, LR, the former party of both Estrosi and Ciotti, and traditionally a strong party in Nice, announced that they would support Estrosi.

== Electoral system and context ==
The 2026 election took place with a closed-list system. If no list gets 50% of votes in the first round, a second round takes place. Every list that gets at least 10% of the votes can access the second round. Every list getting above 5% of votes can merge with a list that accessed the second round. Half of the seats are attributed to the list coming first in the last round. The other half are attributed proportionately between the lists that get more than 5%.

== Candidates ==
=== Horizons ===
- Christian Estrosi, incumbent mayor and regional councillor of Provence-Alpes-Côte d'Azur

=== Union of the Right for the Republic ===
- Éric Ciotti, Deputy and departmental councillor of Alpes-Maritimes

=== The Ecologists ===
- Juliette Chesnel-Le Roux, municipal councillor

=== Ecology at the Center ===
- Jean-Marc Governatori, municipal councillor

=== La France Insoumise ===
- Mireille Damiano

== Campaign ==
In November 2025, Éric Ciotti announced that he had recruited on his list Prefect Françoise Souliman. In January 2026, Jean-Pierre Rivière, who was supposed to be on Ciotti's list in order to become his deputy mayor withdrew after concerns were risen by Estrosi's team over his eligibility. He remained a support for Ciotti and wife later joined his list instead.

In February 2026, Gérard Holtz announced he was joining Estrosi's list, while Jean-Marc Governatori announced he was withdrawing his own candidacy in support of Ciotti's.

== Polling ==
=== First round ===
Polling firm	Fieldwork date	Sample size	Jaquet LO	Damiano LFI	Chesnel-Le Roux LE	Estrosi HOR	Ciotti UDR	Vella REC	Others
Elabe	18-25 Feb 2026	800	1%	11%	13%	30%	41%	4%	—
OpinionWay	16-21 Feb 2026	830	<1%	11%	12%	27%	45%	2%	3%
Ifop	16-20 Feb 2026	608	—	11%	12%	32%	38%	4%	3%
Cluster17	11-15 Feb 2026	763	0.5%	10%	12%	31%	41%	4%	1.5%

=== Second round ===
Polling firm	Fieldwork date	Sample size	Damiano LFI	Chesnel-Le Roux LE	Estrosi HOR	Ciotti UDR
Elabe	18-25 Feb 2026	800	—	22%	33%	45%
Elabe	18-25 Feb 2026	800	20%	—	35%	45%
Elabe	18-25 Feb 2026	800	—	—	49%	51%
OpinionWay	16-21 Feb 2026	830	10%	12%	30%	48%
OpinionWay	16-21 Feb 2026	830	17%	—	32%	51%
OpinionWay	16-21 Feb 2026	830	—	—	45%	55%
Ifop	16-20 Feb 2026	608	10%	14%	36%	40%
Ifop	16-20 Feb 2026	608	—	20%	37%	43%
Ifop	16-20 Feb 2026	608	—	—	50%	50%
Cluster17	11-15 Feb 2026	763	—	—	49%	51%

== Results ==
2026 Nice municipal election results
Candidate	Party	First round		Second round		Seats	
Candidate	Party	Votes	%	Votes	%	Nb.	+/-
Éric Ciotti	UDR-RN-ÉAC	52,274	43.43%	61,009	48.54%	52	▲45
Christian Estrosi	HOR-LR-RE-UDI-MoDem	37,214	30.92%	46,753	37.20%	13	▼43
Juliette Chesnel-Le Roux	LE-PS-PCF	14,356	11.93%	17,926	14.26%	4	▼2
Mireille Damiano	LFI	10,767	8.95%	—		0	0
Céline Forjonnel	DIV	2,690	2.24%	—		0	0
Cédric Vella	REC	2,238	1.86%	—		0	0
Estelle Jacquet	LO	812	0.67%	—		0	0
Registered voters		229,111	53.58%	229,111	55.92%		
Abstention		106,361	46.42%	100,991	44.08%		
Total votes		122,750	100%	128,118	100%		
Blank or invalid votes		2,399	1.95	2,430	1.90		
Valid votes		120,351	98.05	125,668	98.10		

== See also ==
- 2026 French municipal elections
  - 2026 Lyon municipal election
  - 2026 Marseille municipal election
  - 2026 Nancy municipal election
  - 2026 Paris municipal election
  - 2026 Toulouse municipal election
