= Gilbert-Luc Devinaz =

French politician

Member of the Senate for Rhône
- Incumbent
- Assumed office 6 December 2018
- Preceded by: Gérard Collomb

Municipal councilor of Villeurbanne
- Incumbent
- Assumed office 17 July 2017

General Councilor of the Rhône
- In office 28 March 2011 – 29 March 2015
- Preceded by: Bernard Rivalta

Personal details
- Born: 19 July 1953 (age 72) Lyon, France
- Political party: Socialist Party
- Occupation: Politician; Responsible for studies

Gilbert-Luc Devinaz (born 19 July 1953) is a French politician.

He is a member of the Socialist Party. He has been a member of the senate since 2018. He was General Councilor of the Rhône from 2011 to 2015. He was elected municipal councilor of Villeurbanne in 2017. He has served several terms as deputy mayor of Villeurbanne. He also chairs the France-Armenia interparliamentary friendship group.

== Biography ==
Gilbert-Luc Devinaz was born in Lyon, France, in 1953. He will be a member almost without interruption and will occupy various responsibilities there. He was research fellow at the center d'etudes techniques of Lyon. He became for the first time a municipal councilor for the town of Villeurbanne in 1983.

Political offices
Preceded by Gérard Collomb	Member of the Senate for Rhône; 6 December 2018	Succeeded by -
Preceded by -	Municipal councilor of Villeurbanne; 17 July 2017	Succeeded by -
Preceded by Bernard Rivalta	General Councilor of the Rhône; 28 March 2011 – 29 March 2015	Succeeded by -
