= Pierre Oliver =

French politician (born 1992)

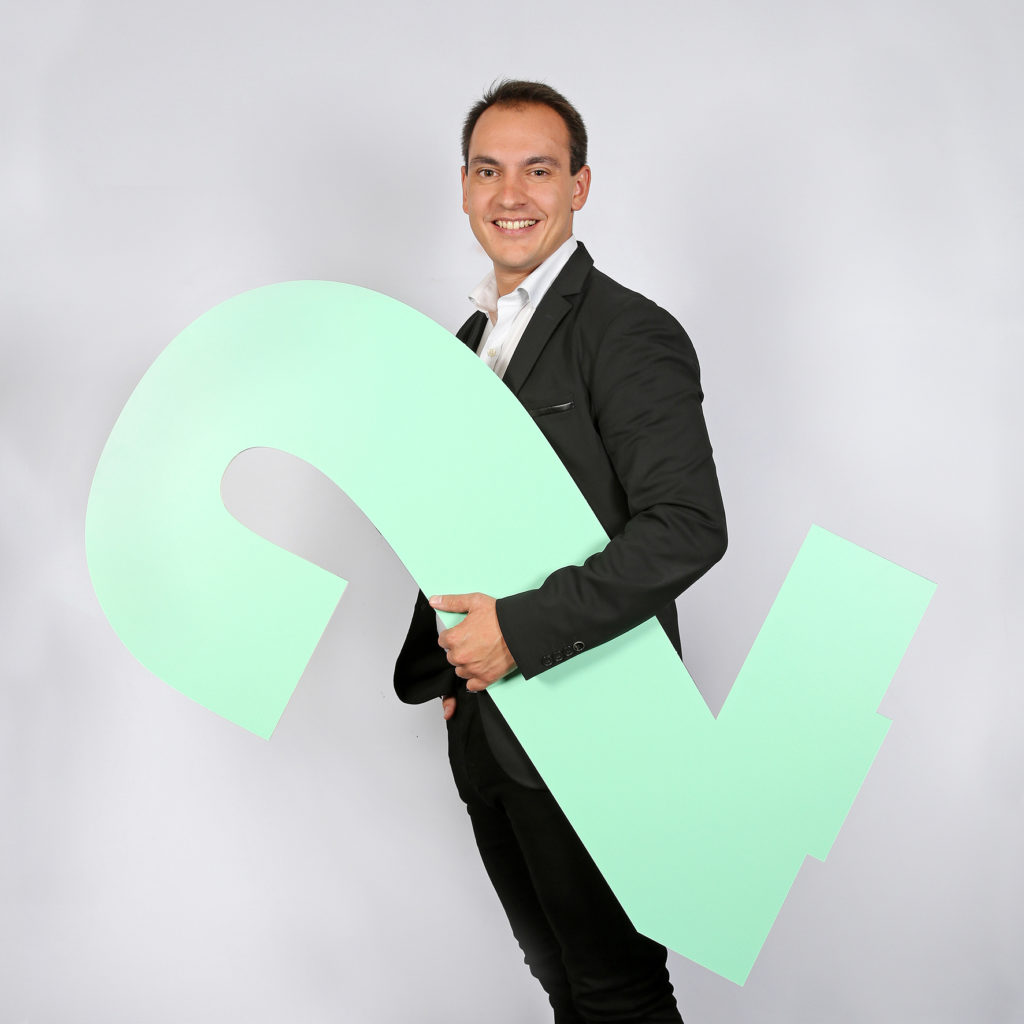
- Oliver in 2019

Mayor of the 2nd arrondissement of Lyon
- Incumbent
- Assumed office 28 June 2020
- Preceded by: Denis Broliquier

Regional Councillor of Auvergne-Rhône-Alpes
- Incumbent
- Assumed office 27 June 2021

Personal details
- Born: 28 June 1992 (age 34)
- Party: The Republicans (since 2015); Union for a Popular Movement (2007–2015)
- Relatives: André Barroux (great-grandfather)
- Education: Lycée Français du Caire; University of Auvergne

Pierre Oliver (born 28 June 1992) is a French politician of The Republicans. Since 2020, he has served as mayor of the 2nd arrondissement of Lyon. In the 2021 regional elections, he was elected regional councillor of Auvergne-Rhône-Alpes. In 2023, he was appointed secretary for urban policy in the shadow cabinet of Éric Ciotti, and departmental secretary of The Republicans in Rhône. He is a candidate for mayor of Lyon in the 2026 municipal elections, with the endorsement of Éric Ciotti, Laurent Wauquiez and François-Xavier Bellamy.

== Early life and career ==
Oliver was born in Lyon in 1992. He is the great-grandson of a Socialist Party politician who served as senator and mayor of Ceyrat. From 1999 to 2009, he lived in Bucharest, Romania. He joined the Union for a Popular Movement in 2007, and became leader of its youth wing in Puy-de-Dôme. He studied at the Lycée Français du Caire and the University of Auvergne.
