= 2026 Toulouse municipal election =

- 15 March 2026 (first round); 22 March 2026 (second round)

All 69 seats of the municipal council 35 seats needed for a majority
- Registered: 281,775
- Turnout: 56.42% (1st round) ▲19.8 pp 62.48% (2nd round) ▲16.6 pp
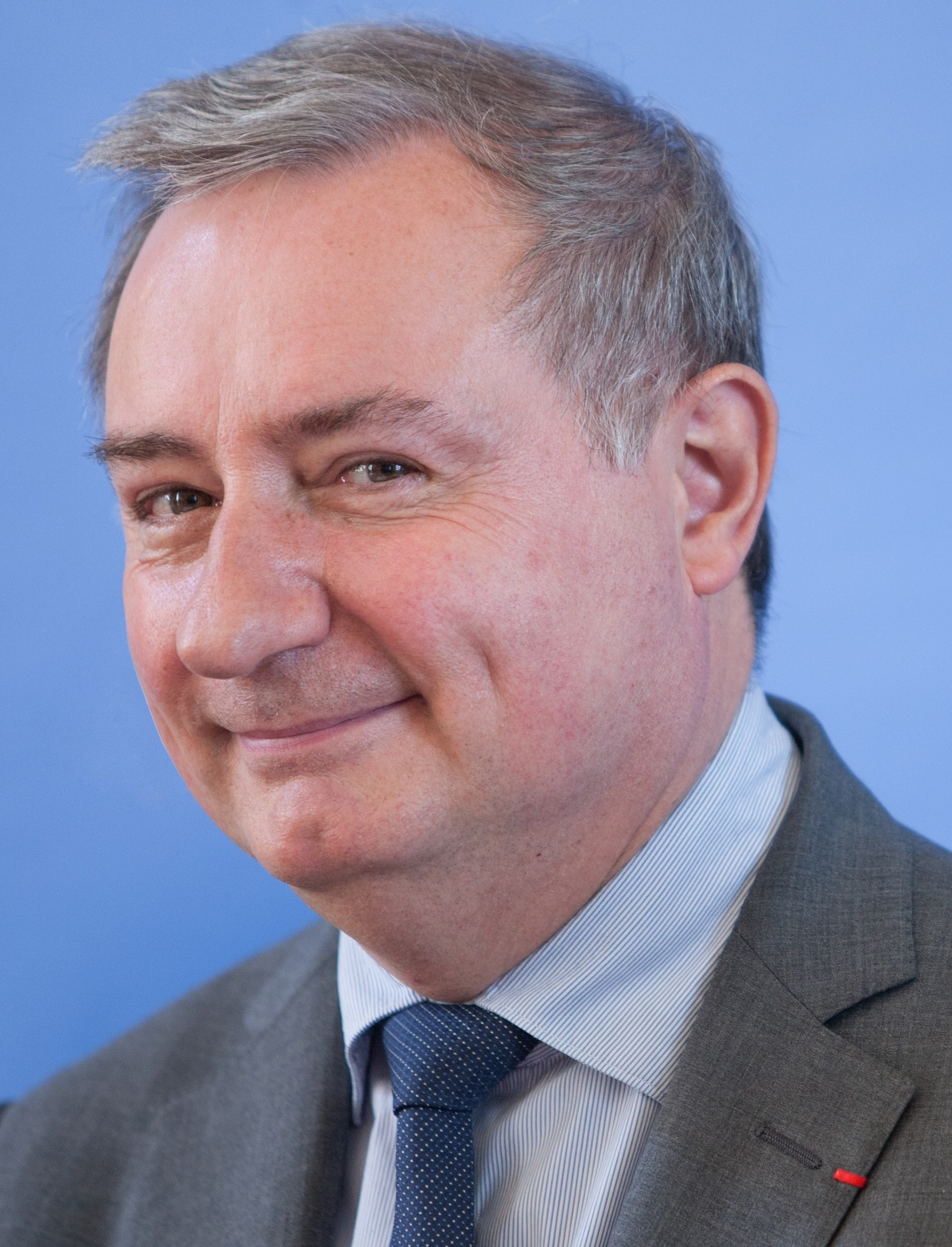

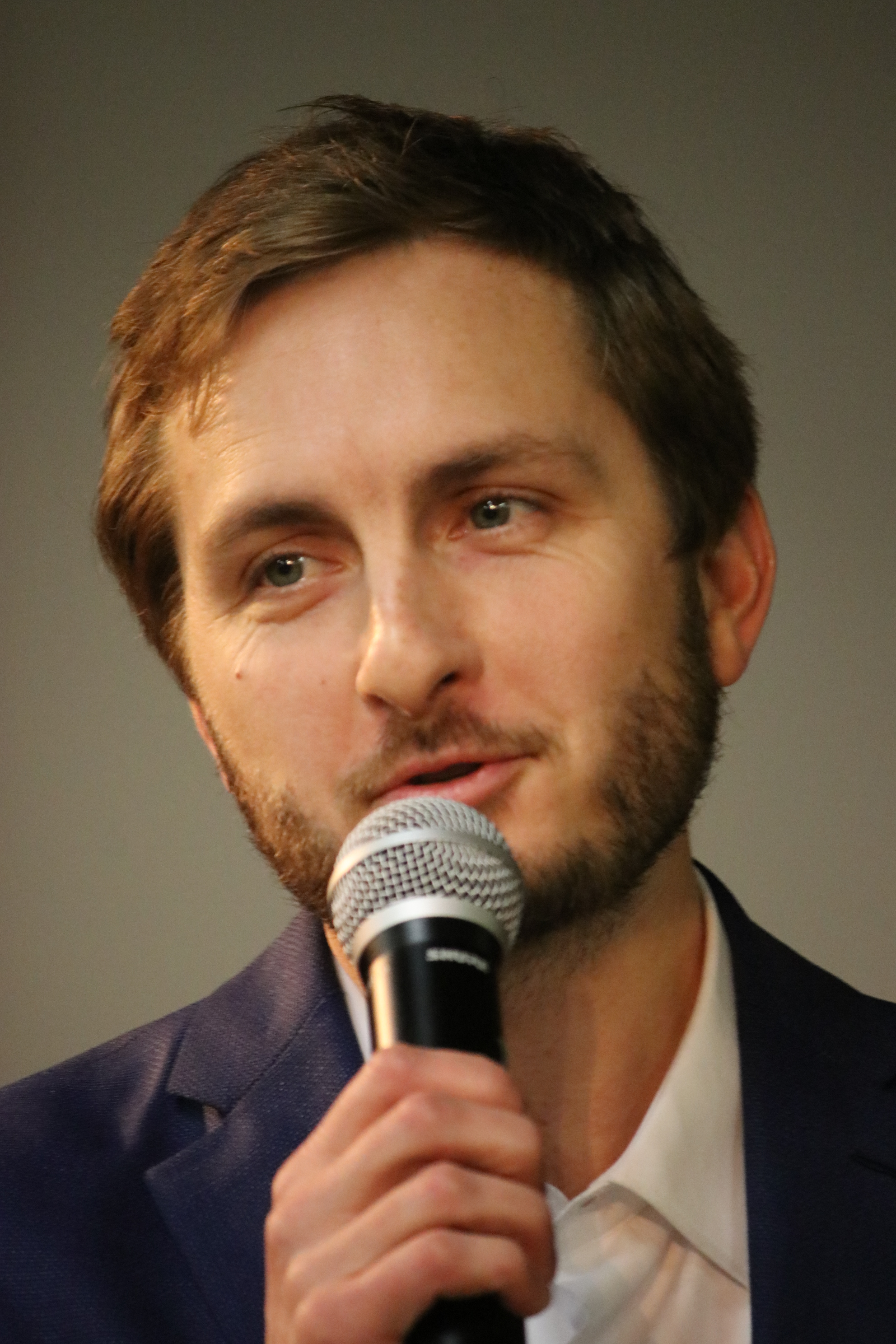
	Majority party	Minority party	Third party
Candidate	Jean-Luc Moudenc	François Piquemal	François Briançon
Party	DVD	LFI	PS
Seats won	53	16	Elected on Piquemal's list
Seat change	Steady	Steady
1st round	58,462	43,274	39,245
Percentage	37.23%	27.56%	24.99%
2nd round	92,152	78,925	Fused with Piquemal's list
Percentage	53.87% ▲1.9 pp	46.13%
- Composition of the municipal council following the election
Mayor before election
Jean-Luc Moudenc
DVD
Elected Mayor
Jean-Luc Moudenc
DVD

The 2026 Toulouse municipal election took place on 15 March 2026 to elect the mayor of Toulouse and the 69 members of the Municipal Council of Toulouse, with a runoff held on 22 March 2026. Incumbent Mayor Jean-Luc Moudenc seek a third consecutive term, having served since 2014. This was the first municipal election in which Moudenc ran as an independent candidate, having left The Republicans in 2022.

Moudenc was re-elected in the second round with 53.87% of the vote, defeating François Piquemal, who received 46.13%. His list won 53 of the 69 seats on the Municipal Council, while Piquemal's list won the remaining 16 seats.

== Background ==
Jean-Luc Moudenc was elected as mayor in 2014 and reelected in 2020. He also had served as mayor from 2004 until his defeat in 2008. He was a member of The Republicans (LR), but quit the party in 2022. He ran for a third term with the support of his former party LR, as well as center-right parties Renaissance (RE) and Horizons (HOR), which had also supported him in 2020. Carole Delga declined to be a candidate for the Socialist Party (PS) and instead supported the candidacy of François Briançon. The Ecologists initially considered Régis Godec as their candidate, but an agreement was reached with Godec and LE supporting Briançon as mayor.

== Electoral system and context ==
The 2026 election took place with a closed-list system. If no list gets 50% of votes in the first round, a second round takes place. Every list that gets at least 10% of the votes can access the second round. Every list receiving more than 5% of votes can merge with a list that accessed the second round. Half of the seats are attributed to the list coming first in the last round. The other half are attributed proportionately between the lists that get more than 5%.

== Candidates ==
=== Socialist Party ===
- François Briançon, municipal councillor

=== Miscellaneous right ===
- Jean-Luc Moudenc, incumbent mayor

=== La France Insoumise ===
- François Piquemal, deputy

=== National Rally ===
- Julien Leonardelli, member of the European Parliament

== Campaign ==
François Briançon launched his bid announcing that if elected, he would support Régis Godec from The Ecologists as president of Toulouse Métropole.

== Polling ==
=== First round ===
Polling firm	Fieldwork date	Sample size	Adrada LO	Piquemal LFI	Briançon PS	Moudenc DVD	Leonardelli RN	Cottrel REC	Others
Ifop	9–18 Feb 2026	602	<0.5%	23%	30%	33%	7%	1.5%	5.5%
Cluster17	2–5 Feb 2026	401	0.5%	19%	32%	33%	8%	4%	2.5%
Cluster17	6–10 Nov 2025	765	1%	23%	30%	33%	10%	3%	—

=== Second round ===
Polling firm	Fieldwork date	Sample size	Piquemal LFI	Briançon PS	Moudenc DVD	Leonardelli RN
Ifop	9–18 Feb 2026	602	23%	34%	37%	6%
Ifop	9–18 Feb 2026	602	24%	35%	41%	—
Ifop	9–18 Feb 2026	602	—	53%	47%	—
Cluster17	6–10 Nov 2025	765	24%	30%	35%	11%
Cluster17	6–10 Nov 2025	765	25%	31%	44%	—
Cluster17	6–10 Nov 2025	765	—	53%	47%	—

== Results ==
Candidate	Party	First round		Second round		Seats	
Candidate	Party	Votes	%	Votes	%	Nb.	+/-
Jean-Luc Moudenc	LR-RE-HOR-UDI-MoDem	58,462	37.23%	92,152	53.87%	50	–3
François Piquemal	LFI	43,274	27.56%	78,925	46.13%	15	–1
François Briançon	PS-LE-PCF-PP	39,245	24.99%	78,925	46.13%	15	–1
Julien Leonardelli	RN-UDR	8,447	5.38%	—		0	0
Lambert Meilhac	DVC	2,648	1.69%	—		0	0
Arthur Cottrel	REC	1,953	1.24%	—		0	0
Vanessa Pedinotti	RP	1,611	1.03%	—		0	0
Malena Adrada	LO	653	0.42%	—		0	0
Guillaume Scali	NPA-R	438	0.28%	—		0	0
Julian Menendez	PT	290	0.18%	—		0	0
Registered voters		281,775	56.42	281,775	62.48		
Abstention		122,798	43.58	105,708	37.52		
Total votes		158,977	100	175,999	100		
Blank or invalid votes		1,956	1.23	4,922	2.80		
Valid votes		157,021	98.77	171,077	97.20		

== See also ==
- 2026 French municipal elections
  - 2026 Lyon municipal election
  - 2026 Marseille municipal election
  - 2026 Nancy municipal election
  - 2026 Nice municipal election
  - 2026 Paris municipal election
