= Valérie Debord =

French politician

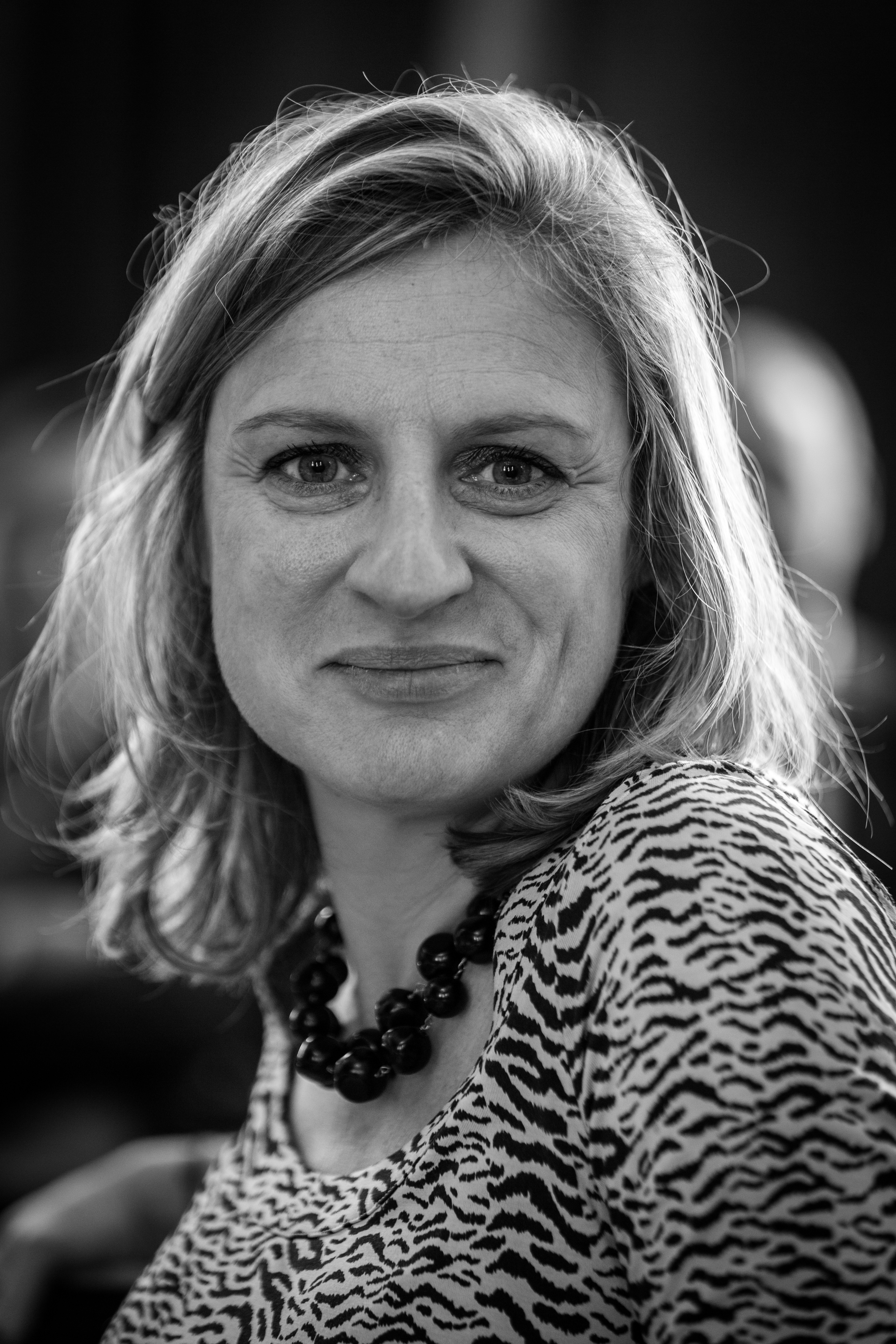
- Valérie Debord in 2015

Member of the Regional Council of Grand Est
- Incumbent
- Assumed office 4 January 2016
- President: Jean Rottner

Member of the National Assembly for Meurthe-et-Moselle's 3rd constituency
- In office 2007–2012
- Preceded by: Claude Gaillard
- Succeeded by: Hervé Féron

Personal details
- Born: 29 November 1971 (age 54) Chaumont, France
- Party: The Republicans
- Spouse: Sébastien Huyghe (m. 2018)
- Children: 2
- Education: Nancy University

Valérie Debord (born 29 November 1971) was a member of the National Assembly of France. She is of Italian origin and represented the Meurthe-et-Moselle department, and was a member of the Union for a Popular Movement. She lost her seat on 17 June 2012 to Socialist Hervé Féron, by 54.15% to 45.85%.
