= Lycée Français du Caire =

School in Cairo, Egypt

Lycée français du Caire الثانوية الفرنسية بالقاهرة
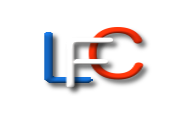

Location
- Cairo; Egypt
- Coordinates: 29.9525°N 31.2684°E

Information
- Type: "Établissement en gestion directe de l'AEFE (EGD)"
- Head teacher: M. Yassine ABBAS
- Teaching staff: c.140
- Enrollment: c.2000
- Language: French
- Website: lfcaire.org

Lycée Français du Caire (LFC; Arabic: الثانوية الفرنسية بالقاهرة) is the French International School in Cairo, Egypt.

It is directly operated by the Agency for French Education Abroad (AEFE), an agency of the French government.

== Structure ==
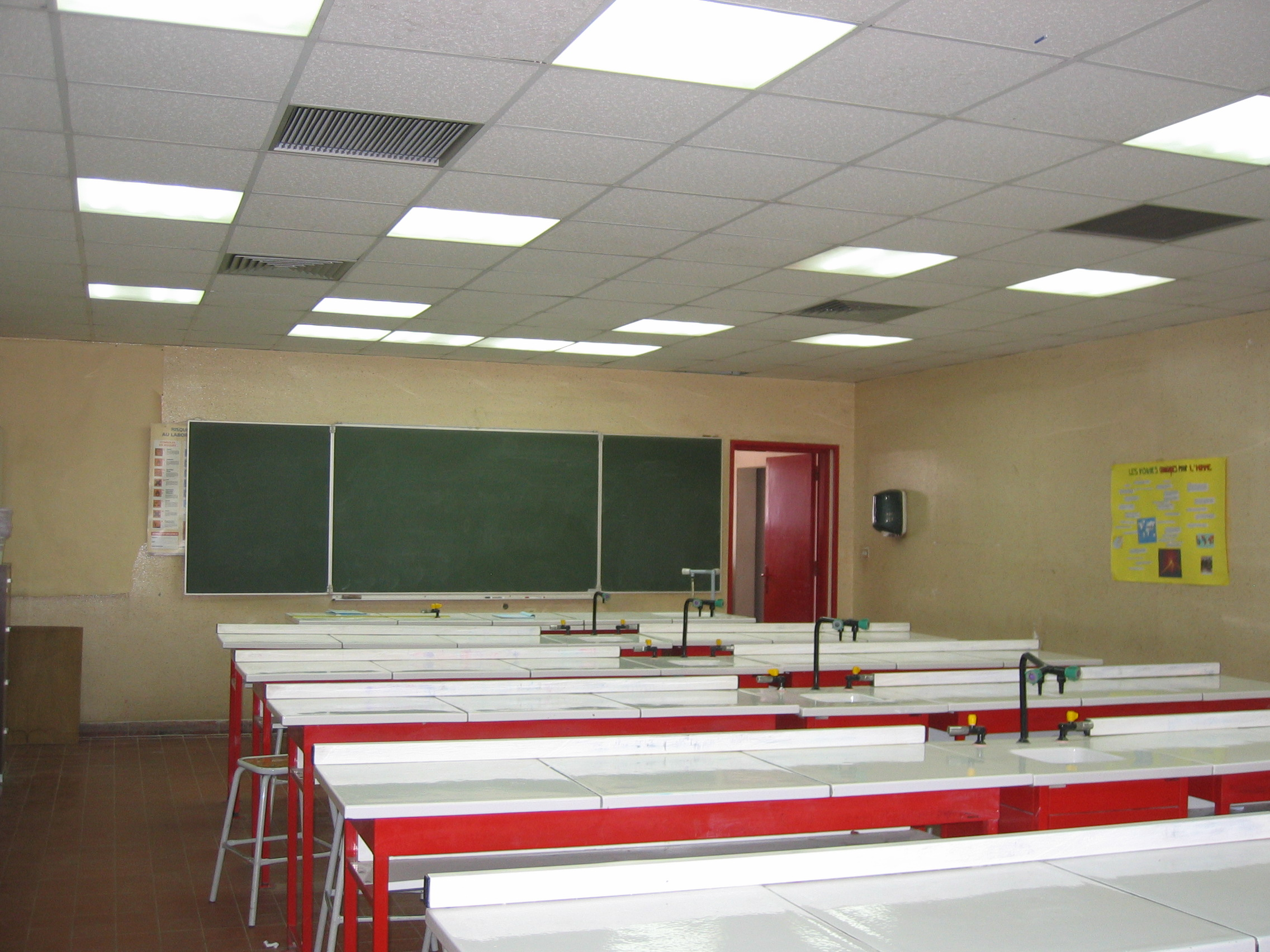
LFC's laboratories

There are three primary campuses, with one each in Maadi, New Cairo City, and Zamalek. The secondary classes are held in a campus in El Mearag.

The school has more than 2000 pupils and 140 teachers.

== History ==
The school was founded in 1911, with its first campus being in Maadi. In the 1970s, a second campus was opened in Zamalek.

In 1990 a third campus was opened in Heliopolis. It later relocated to Rehab in 2004 and then to New Cairo in 2015.

Between 2011 and 2013, construction took place on a fourth site in El Mearag to accommodate middle and high school students. The site was officially inaugurated in 2015.

== See also ==
- Egypt–France relations
