= Mathieu Klein =

French politician

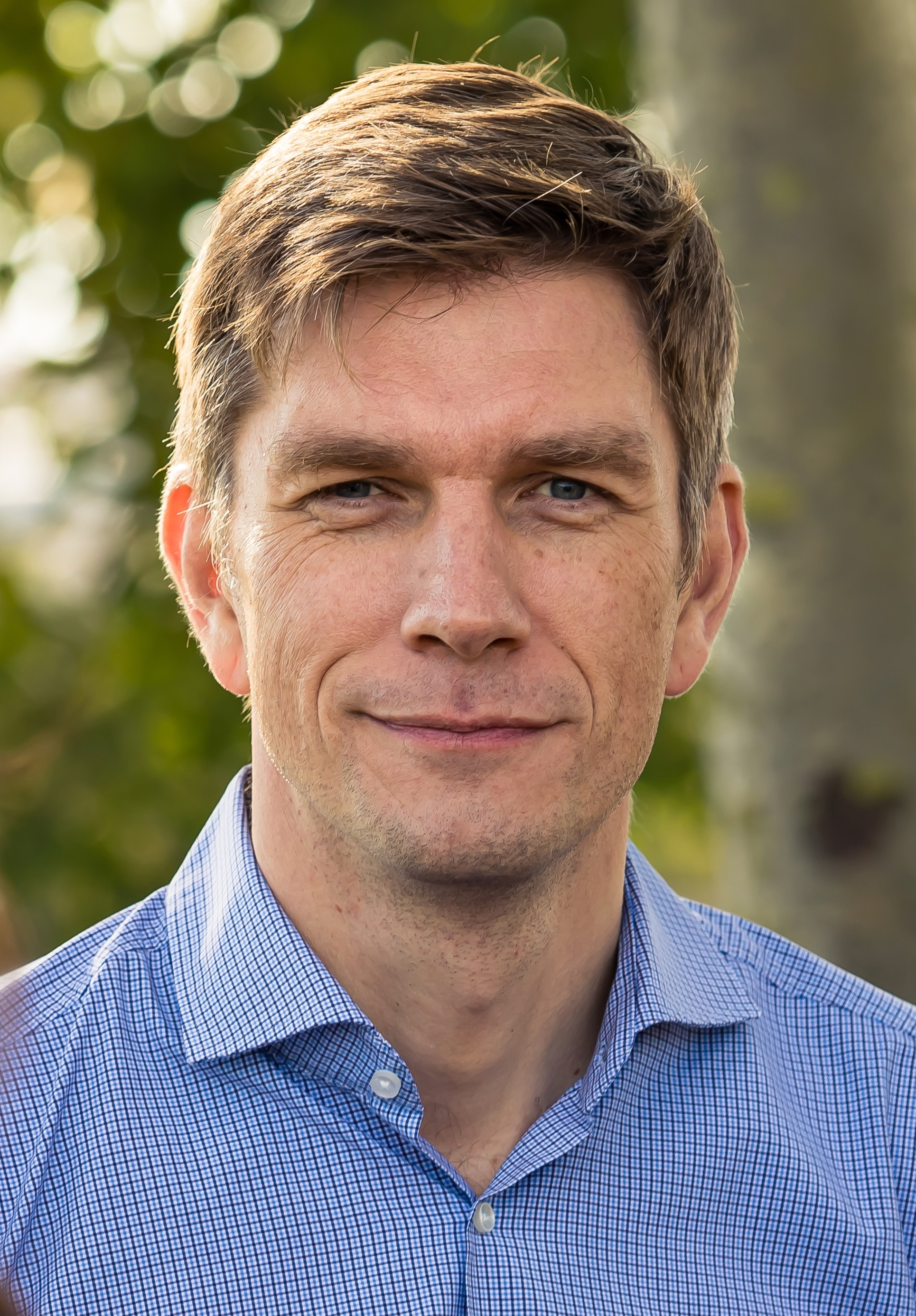
- Mathieu Klein in 2019

Mayor of Nancy
- Incumbent
- Assumed office 5 July 2020
- Preceded by: Laurent Hénart

Municipal Councillor of Nancy
- Incumbent
- Assumed office 16 March 2008

President of the Departmental Council of Meurthe-et-Moselle
- In office 22 April 2014 – 13 July 2020
- Preceded by: Michel Dinet
- Succeeded by: Valérie Beausert-Leick

Departmental Councillor of Meurthe-et-Moselle
- Incumbent
- Assumed office 28 March 2004
- Constituency: Canton de Nancy-Nord (2006–2009); Canton de Nancy-2 (2009–2016)

Personal details
- Born: 20 January 1976 (age 50) Phalsbourg, France
- Party: Socialist Party (1992–present)

Mathieu Klein (born 20 January 1976) is a French politician serving as Mayor of Nancy since 2020.

A member of the Socialist Party since 1992, he is also President of the Departmental Council of Meurthe-et-Moselle. After the 2020 French municipal elections, he became the first socialist Mayor of Nancy since the end of the second World War.

== Early life and education ==
Mathieu Klein was born into a family of teachers in Phalsbourg, Moselle. Alongside his two brothers, he was brought up in Holving, before pursuing his secondary education at Sarreguemines. He moved to Nancy, France in 1993 to study history and sociology. He then continued his university studies in Paris.

== Political career ==
Mathieu Klein is a member of the Socialist Party since 1992, and has his support in favour of a positive result in the French referendum on the Maastricht Treaty. He then became a student member of the National Union of Students of France in Nancy, and then in Paris, he became a member of its national bureau in charge of health matters.

In 1994, in Nancy, he founded an LGBT association, dedicated to the promotion of equality and fighting against homophobia.

Mathieu Klein pursued his political career within the Socialist Party, ascending to become the Departmental President of the Young Socialist Movement, Secretary of the Nancy branch of the Socialist Party, and then, in 2008, assuming the role of First Secretary of the Meurthe-et-Moselle branch of the party, alongside being a member of its national bureau.

In 2000, he worked under Michel Dinet who was the then President of the Departmental Council of the Meurthe-et-Moselle and also the socialist, who would go on to become his political mentor. In the 2004 French departmental elections, Klein was elected as the Departmental Councillor of the Meurthe-et-Moselle in the Nancy North constituency, winning against Senator Philippe Nachbar, a member of the UMP, in the Second round with 60.7% of the vote. In the 2011 elections, Klein was re-elected with 61.66% of the vote in the Second round.

Following the 2002 French presidential election, he joined the New Socialist Party. In 2009, he joined the team of Martine Aubry, the then First Secretary of the Socialist Party, accompanying her candidacy in the 2011 French Socialist Party presidential primary.

In 2005, Klein contested a by-election in Meurthe-et-Moselle's 1st constituency, but was defeated by 399 votes by the incumbent Laurent Hénart. In the 2007 French legislative election, Klein stood as a candidate again and lost, obtaining 49.2% of the vote in the Second round. In the 2014 French municipal elections in Nancy, Klein's list was defeated by Laurent Hénart.

Following the accidental death of his mentor Michel Dinet, he replaced him as President of the Departmental Assembly of Meurthe-et-Moselle in 2014, leaving his position as Departmental Vice-President for education and civic innovation on the Departmental Council. In the 2015 French departmental elections, Klein was elected in the Nancy 2 canton, receiving 56.7% of the vote, and returned as President of the Departmental Council.

In 2016, Klein announced his support for Manuel Valls and became one of his spokespersons during the 2017 French Socialist Party presidential primary campaign.

Following the proposal of French Prime Minister Édouard Philippe in 2018, Mathieu Klein was made responsible for a project on the professional integration of beneficiaries of the French welfare benefit Revenu de solidarité active with Claire Pitollat. In October 2018, Klein refused a ministerial position in Second Philippe government.

In the 2020 French municipal elections in Nancy, Klein headed the Nancy en grand list of the Socialist Party, which took its First place in the First round on 15 March 2020, with 37.9% of the vote. Following this result, Klein merged his list with that of Europe Ecology – The Greens. In the Second round, held on 28 June 2020, Klein prevailed with 54.5% of the vote. He was confirmed as Mayor on 15 July 2020 by 43 votes in the municipal council of Nancy, becoming the first left-wing person to exercise this mandate since the end of the Second World War. He is seconded by twenty adjoints au maire.

== Personal life ==
Mathieu Klein is a gay man and is involved with associations which are engaged in the fight against homophobia. He is married to a general practitioner and the couple has three children.

== Honours ==
Knight, National Order of Merit (2017)
