= Conseil d'arrondissement =

Former legislative council of arrondissements

Conseil d'arrondissement (transl. Arrondissement council) can have different meanings depending on the country.

== France ==
In France, conseil d'arrondissement can refer to one of the former departmental arrondissement councils or to one of the municipal arrondissement councils (in Paris, Lyon or Marseille).

=== Departmental arrondissement councils ===
Each French department is subdivided into arrondissements, each having its sub-prefecture and being headed by a sub-prefect. During the Third Republic, the arrondissement council was formed by councilors elected from the cantons, using a two-round majoritarian voting system, similar to that used for general councilors. The council had to have at least nine councilors, corresponding to nine cantons. If there were not enough cantons, the most populated cantons were divided into two constituencies. Councilors were elected for six years, with half being renewed every three years.

Like general councilors, candidates had to be at least 25 years old to be elected. Arrondissement councilors were part of the electoral college that elected senators, along with deputies, general councilors, and delegates from municipal councils. Their functions were unpaid and could be combined with a parliamentary mandate. Their responsibilities were limited, primarily involving the allocation of direct taxes.

The arrondissement councils were suspended by the law of October 12, 1940, and were never reactivated.

=== Municipal arrondissement councils ===
Three cities in France—Lyon, Marseille, and Paris—have municipal arrondissements. The arrondissement council (or sector council in Marseille, where a sector includes several arrondissements) is elected according to the voting system for municipalities with more than 1,000 inhabitants. One-third of the elected members also sit on the city's municipal council, while the other two-thirds serve only on the arrondissement council. The council elects an arrondissement mayor from among its members who also serve on the municipal council.

The functions of the arrondissement council and the mayor are as follows:

- The council can send written questions to the city's mayor on any matter concerning the arrondissement and can request the municipal council to discuss these matters.
- The council is consulted by the municipal council on projects to be executed within the arrondissement. It provides opinions on issues such as local association subsidies and changes to the local urban plan. It manages local facilities but must obtain municipal council approval for new programs.
- Housing allocations within the arrondissement (or sector) that fall under the city's purview are divided equally between the arrondissement (or sector) mayor and the city mayor.
- The municipal council and city mayor can delegate certain powers to arrondissement (or sector) councils and mayors.
- The council can establish neighborhood councils that allow residents to regularly gather and make proposals regarding their neighborhood's life. In Marseille, the administrative division of neighborhoods respects the limits of municipal arrondissements, even though executive competence is at the sector level. However, neighborhood councils can encompass multiple neighborhoods within the same sector but not necessarily within the same arrondissement.

== Quebec ==
In Quebec, large cities are divided into arrondissements, which are managed by arrondissement councils composed of local elected officials. Each arrondissement has a president or mayor and councilors elected within the arrondissement.

Arrondissement councils are responsible for urban planning, fire prevention, waste management, local economic development support, parks, sports and cultural facilities, road maintenance, and permits.

== Senegal ==
Arrondissement councils in Senegal were established by Law No. 96-09 of March 22, 1996. According to Article 2, arrondissement councilors are elected by direct universal suffrage.
