= Laurent Hénart =

French politician (born 1968)

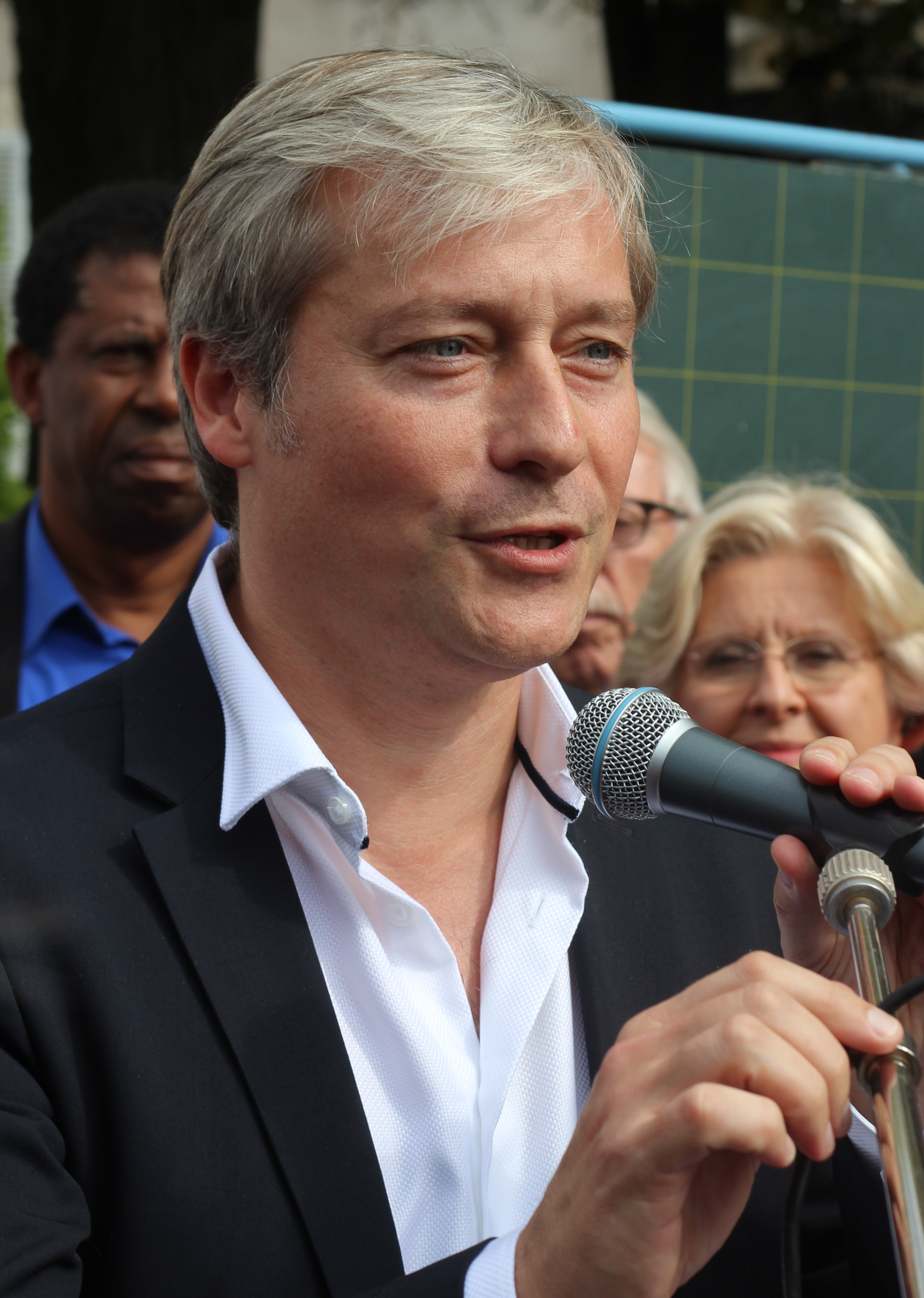
- Hénart in 2014

President of the Radical Party
- In office 22 June 2014 – 28 September 2024
- Preceded by: Jean-Louis Borloo
- Succeeded by: Nathalie Delattre

Mayor of Nancy
- In office 6 April 2014 – 5 July 2020
- Preceded by: André Rossinot
- Succeeded by: Mathieu Klein

Secretary of State for Youth Professional Integration
- In office 31 March 2004 – 31 May 2005
- Prime Minister: Jean-Pierre Raffarin
- Preceded by: Office established
- Succeeded by: Gérard Larcher (Minister Delegate)

Member of the National Assembly for Meurthe-et-Moselle's 1st constituency
- In office 12 September 2005 – 19 June 2012
- Preceded by: Corinne Marchal-Tarnus
- Succeeded by: Chaynesse Khirouni
- In office 19 June 2002 – 30 April 2004
- Preceded by: Jean-Jacques Denis
- Succeeded by: Corinne Marchal-Tarnus

Personal details
- Born: Laurent Émile Michel Hénart; 15 October 1968 (age 57) Laxou, France
- Party: Radical Party
- Education: Nancy University; Sciences Po

Laurent Émile Michel Hénart (French pronunciation: [lɔʁɑ̃ enaʁ]; born 15 October 1968) is a French politician who presided over the Radical Party from 2014 to 2024. He also served as Mayor of Nancy from 2014 to 2020.

== Political career ==
Hénart was a member of the National Assembly of France and represented the Meurthe-et-Moselle department. In June 2017, he declared himself in favor of the reunification of the Radical Party and the Radical Left Party. On November 12, 2017, he was re-elected party president with 79% of the vote, against the backdrop of the party's forthcoming merger with the PRG in December.

Before the Republicans' 2016 presidential primary, Hénard endorsed Alain Juppé as the party's candidate for the 2017 French presidential election. In 2019, he publicly declared his support for the incumbent president, Emmanuel Macron. Before the 2022 elections, he endorsed Macron for re-election.

Hénard was a candidate for Ensemble led by Valérie Hayer in the 2024 European elections but failed to obtain a seat in the European Parliament.

== Honours ==
- Knight of the Legion of Honour (2020)
