= Georges Képénékian =

French physician and politician

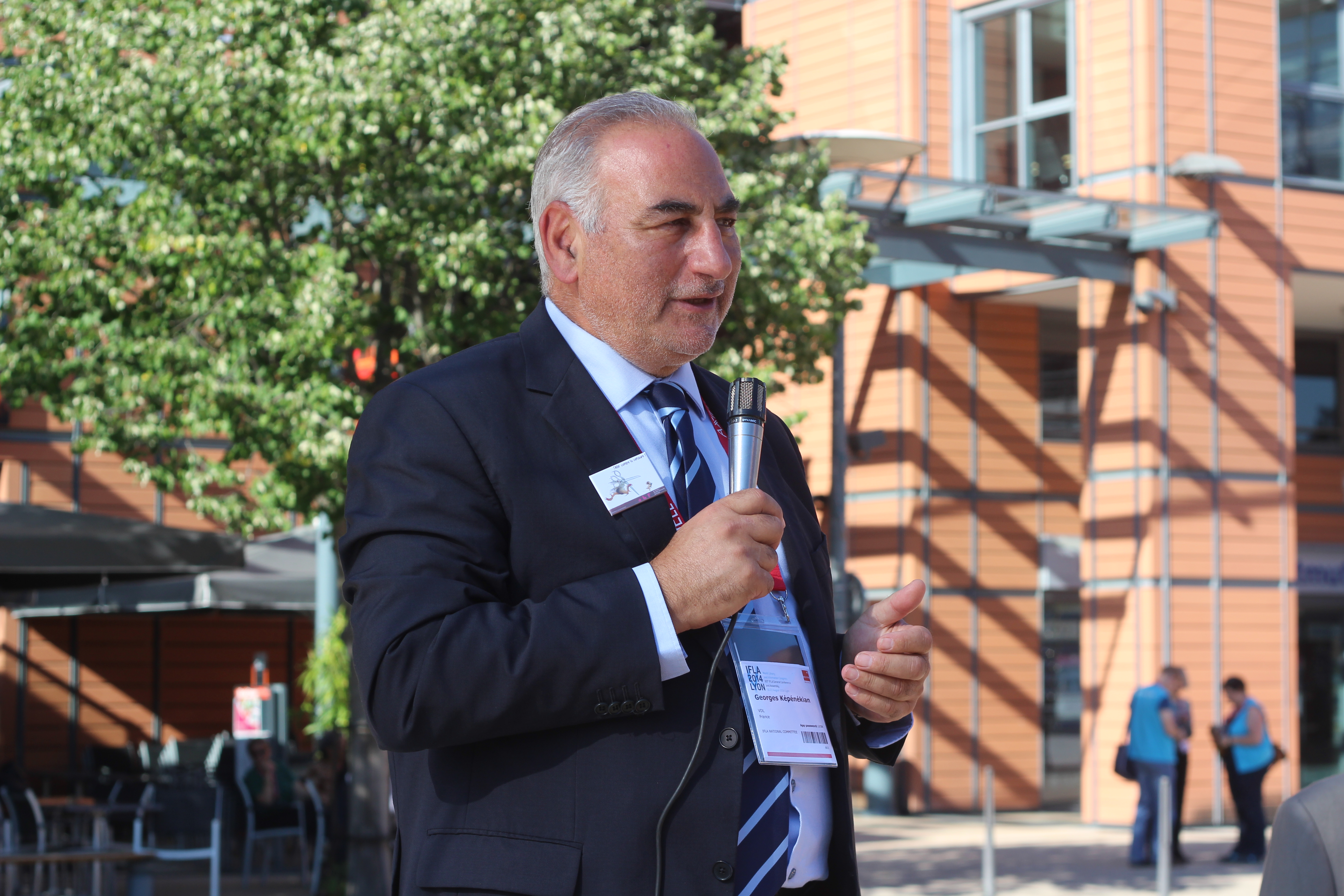

Mayor of Lyon
- In office 17 July 2017 – 5 November 2018
- Preceded by: Gérard Collomb
- Succeeded by: Gérard Collomb

Personal details
- Born: 9 August 1949 (age 76) Lyon, France
- Party: Socialist Party (until 2017)

Georges Képénékian (born 9 August 1949) is a French politician of Armenian origin who served as Mayor of Lyon from 2017 to 2018. He is a member of France's Socialist Party.

Képénékian was born in 1949 in the 2nd arrondissement of Lyon to Kevork Képénékian. He is a doctor and surgeon in urology and prior to his election as mayor was the strategic director of Centre hospitalier Saint-Joseph Saint-Luc in Lyon since 2005.

He was elected as Lyon municipal counselor from the 3rd arrondissement of Lyon and became a permanent member of the greater Metropolitan Lyon area Municipal Council. Since 2008, he headed the municipality's culture, great events and citizens' rights portfolios and in 2014, was appointed as principal deputy mayor to Lyon mayor Gérard Collomb.

After nomination of mayor Gérard Collomb as French Interior Minister in the first Édouard Philippe government under president Emmanuel Macron, Képénékian was elected by the Municipal Council as mayor of the city with absolute majority on 17 July 2017, with 49 votes, 13 more than the required absolute majority needed which is 36, representing a major win for the Socialist Party. His main rival Stéphane Guilland from The Republicans (LR) received 12 votes, with 6 votes going to Denis Broliquier of the Union of Democrats and Independents (UDI) and 3 for Nathalie Perrin-Gilbert of the Groupe de Réflexions et d'Actions Métropolitaines, a Lyon local political movement also known as GRAM.

He is married and father of 3 children. He is engaged in the recognition of the Armenian Genocide and is a former member of administration of foundation Bullukian of Lyon.
