= Hervé Féron =

French politician

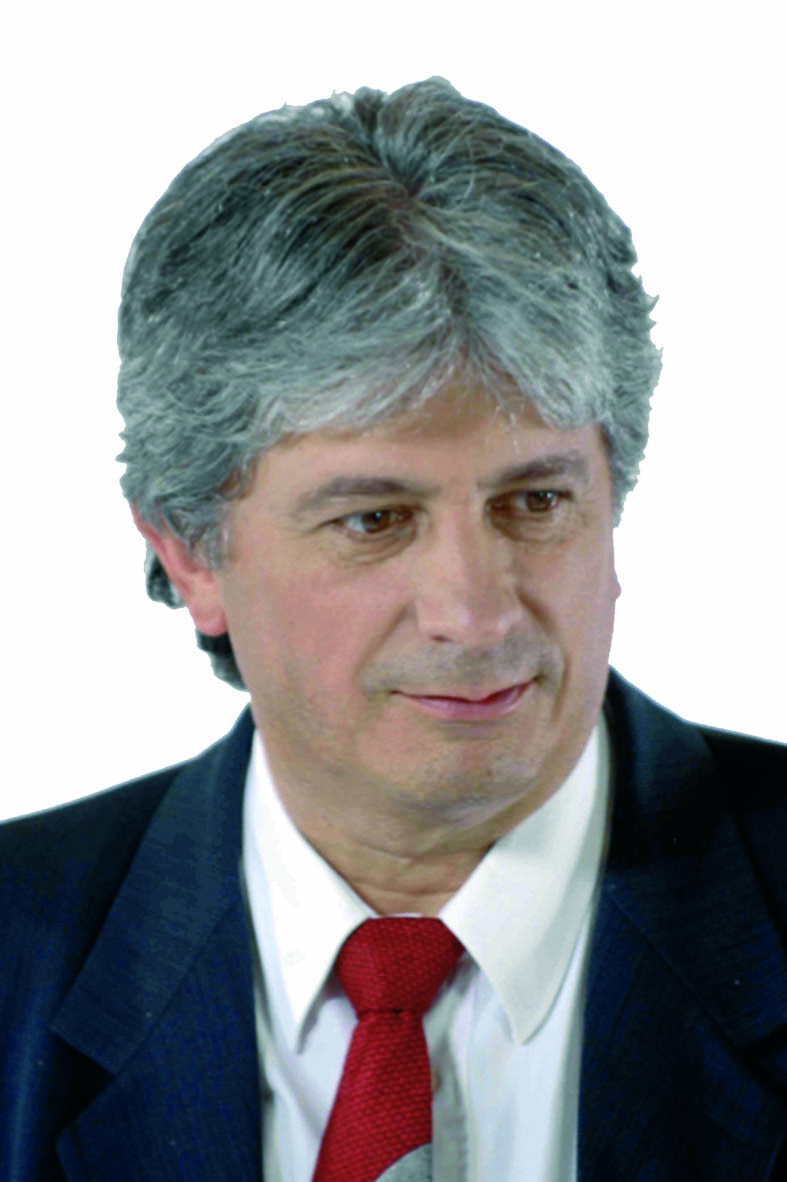
Hervé Féron

Hervé Féron (born August 3, 1956 in Luxeuil-les-Bains, Haute-Saône) is a member of the National Assembly of France. He represents the Meurthe-et-Moselle department, is a member of the Socialist Party and of the Socialiste, radical, citoyen et divers gauche parliamentary group.
