= List of French senators (2011–2014) =

List by departments of the senators of Senate of France (2011-2014) elected in the various renewals.

== List of senators by departments ==
Département	Name	Party	Group
Ain	Jacques Berthou	PS	Socialist
Ain	Sylvie Goy-Chavent	UDI	Union of Democrats and Independents - Centrist Union
Ain	Rachel Mazuir	PS	Socialist
Aisne	Pierre André	UMP	Union for a Popular Movement
Aisne	Yves Daudigny	PS	Socialist
Aisne	Antoine Lefèvre	UMP	Union for a Popular Movement
Allier	Gérard Dériot	UMP	Union for a Popular Movement
Allier	Mireille Schurch	PCF	Communist, Republican, Citizen
Alpes-de-Haute-Provence	Claude Domeizel	PS	Socialist
Hautes-Alpes	Pierre Bernard-Reymond	DVD	Administrative Meeting For Senators Not On the List Of Another
Alpes-Maritimes	Marc Daunis	PS	Socialist
Alpes-Maritimes	Colette Giudicelli	UMP	Union for a Popular Movement
Alpes-Maritimes	Jean-Pierre Leleux	UMP	Union for a Popular Movement
Alpes-Maritimes	Louis Nègre	UMP	Union for a Popular Movement
Alpes-Maritimes	René Vestri	UMP	Union for a Popular Movement
Ardèche	Yves Chastan	PS	Socialist
Ardèche	Michel Teston	PS	Socialist
Ardennes	Benoît Huré	UMP	Union for a Popular Movement
Ardennes	Marc Laménie	UMP	Union for a Popular Movement
Ariège	Jean-Pierre Bel	PS	Socialist
Aube	Philippe Adnot	DVD	Administrative Meeting For Senators Not On the List Of Another
Aube	Yann Gaillard	UMP	Union for a Popular Movement
Aude	Roland Courteau	PS	Socialist
Aude	Marcel Rainaud	PS	Socialist
Aveyron	Anne-Marie Escoffier	PRG	European Democratic and Social Rally
Aveyron	Alain Fauconnier	PS	Socialist
Bouches-du-Rhône	Serge Andreoni	PS	Socialist
Bouches-du-Rhône	Jean-Claude Gaudin	UMP	Union for a Popular Movement
Bouches-du-Rhône	Samia Ghali	PS	Socialist
Bouches-du-Rhône	Bruno Gilles	UMP	Union for a Popular Movement
Bouches-du-Rhône	Jean-Noël Guérini	DVG	Socialist
Bouches-du-Rhône	Sophie Joissains	UMP	Union for a Popular Movement
Bouches-du-Rhône	Isabelle Pasquet	PCF	Communist, Republican, Citizen
Bouches-du-Rhône	Roland Povinelli	PS	Socialist
Calvados	Ambroise Dupont	UMP	Union for a Popular Movement
Calvados	Jean-Léonce Dupont	UDI	Union of Democrats and Independents - Centrist Union
Calvados	René Garrec	UMP	Union for a Popular Movement
Cantal	Pierre Jarlier	UDI	Union of Democrats and Independents - Centrist Union
Cantal	Jacques Mézard	PRG	European Democratic and Social Rally
Charente	Nicole Bonnefoy	PS	Socialist
Charente	Michel Boutant	PS	Socialist
Charente-Maritime	Claude Belot	UMP	Union for a Popular Movement
Charente-Maritime	Michel Doublet	UMP	Union for a Popular Movement
Charente-Maritime	Daniel Laurent	UMP	Union for a Popular Movement
Cher	François Pillet	UMP	Union for a Popular Movement
Cher	Rémy Pointereau	UMP	Union for a Popular Movement
Corrèze	Bernadette Bourzai	PS	Socialist
Corrèze	René Teulade	PS	Socialist
Corse-du-Sud	Nicolas Alfonsi	PRG	European Democratic and Social Rally
Haute-Corse	François Vendasi	PRG	European Democratic and Social Rally
Côte-d'Or	Alain Houpert	UMP	Union for a Popular Movement
Côte-d'Or	François Patriat	PS	Socialist
Côte-d'Or	François Rebsamen	PS	Socialist
Côtes-d'Armor	Yannick Botrel	PS	Socialist
Côtes-d'Armor	Ronan Kerdraon	PS	Socialist
Côtes-d'Armor	Gérard Le Cam	PCF	Communist, Republican, Citizen
Creuse	Jean-Jacques Lozach	PS	Socialist
Creuse	Renée Nicoux	PS	Socialist
Dordogne	Claude Bérit-Débat	PS	Socialist
Dordogne	Bernard Cazeau	PS	Socialist
Doubs	Martial Bourquin	PS	Socialist
Doubs	Jean-François Humbert	UMP	Union for a Popular Movement
Doubs	Claude Jeannerot	PS	Socialist
Drôme	Jean Besson	PS	Socialist
Drôme	Didier Guillaume	PS	Socialist
Drôme	Bernard Piras	PS	Socialist
Eure	Joël Bourdin	UMP	Union for a Popular Movement
Eure	Hervé Maurey	UDI	Union of Democrats and Independents - Centrist Union
Eure	Ladislas Poniatowski	UMP	Union for a Popular Movement
Eure-et-Loir	Joël Billard	UMP	Union for a Popular Movement
Eure-et-Loir	Gérard Cornu	UMP	Union for a Popular Movement
Eure-et-Loir	Albéric de Montgolfier	UMP	Union for a Popular Movement
Finistère	Maryvonne Blondin	PS	Socialist
Finistère	Jean-Luc Fichet	PS	Socialist
Finistère	François Marc	PS	Socialist
Finistère	Philippe Paul	UMP	Union for a Popular Movement
Gard	Jean-Paul Fournier	UMP	Union for a Popular Movement
Gard	Françoise Laurent-Perrigot	PS	Socialist
Gard	Simon Sutour	PS	Socialist
Haute-Garonne	Bertrand Auban	PS	Socialist
Haute-Garonne	Alain Chatillon	PR	Union for a Popular Movement
Haute-Garonne	Françoise Laborde	PRG	European Democratic and Social Rally
Haute-Garonne	Jean-Jacques Mirassou	PS	Socialist
Haute-Garonne	Jean-Pierre Plancade	PRG	European Democratic and Social Rally
Gers	Aymeri de Montesquiou	UDI	Union of Democrats and Independents - Centrist Union
Gers	Raymond Vall	PRG	European Democratic and Social Rally
Gironde	Alain Anziani	PS	Socialist
Gironde	Françoise Cartron	PS	Socialist
Gironde	Gérard César	UMP	Union for a Popular Movement
Gironde	Marie-Hélène des Esgaulx	UMP	Union for a Popular Movement
Gironde	Philippe Madrelle	PS	Socialist
Gironde	Xavier Pintat	UMP	Union for a Popular Movement
Hérault	Marie-Thérèse Bruguière	UMP	Union for a Popular Movement
Hérault	Raymond Couderc	UMP	Union for a Popular Movement
Hérault	Robert Navarro	DVG	Socialist
Hérault	Robert Tropéano	PRG	European Democratic and Social Rally
Ille-et-Vilaine	Edmond Hervé	PS	Socialist
Ille-et-Vilaine	Virginie Klès	PS	Socialist
Ille-et-Vilaine	Dominique de Legge	UMP	Union for a Popular Movement
Ille-et-Vilaine	Jacky Le Menn	PS	Socialist
Indre	Jean-François Mayet	UMP	Union for a Popular Movement
Indre	Louis Pinton	UMP	Union for a Popular Movement
Indre-et-Loire	Marie-France Beaufils	PCF	Communist, Republican, Citizen
Indre-et-Loire	Jean-Jacques Filleul	PS	Socialist
Indre-et-Loire	Jean Germain	PS	Socialist
Isère	Jacques Chiron	PS	Socialist
Isère	Annie David	PCF	Communist, Republican, Citizen
Isère	Bernard Saugey	UMP	Union for a Popular Movement
Isère	Michel Savin	UMP	Union for a Popular Movement
Isère	André Vallini	PS	Socialist
Jura	Gérard Bailly	UMP	Union for a Popular Movement
Jura	Gilbert Barbier	UMP	European Democratic and Social Rally
Landes	Jean-Louis Carrère	PS	Socialist
Landes	Danielle Michel	PS	Socialist
Loir-et-Cher	Jacqueline Gourault	MoDem	Union of Democrats and Independents - Centrist Union
Loir-et-Cher	Jeanny Lorgeoux	PS	Socialist
Loire	Cécile Cukierman	PCF	Communist, Republican, Citizen
Loire	Bernard Fournier	UMP	Union for a Popular Movement
Loire	Jean-Claude Frécon	PS	Socialist
Loire	Maurice Vincent	PS	Socialist
Haute-Loire	Jean Boyer	UDI	Union of Democrats and Independents - Centrist Union
Haute-Loire	Gérard Roche	UDI	Union of Democrats and Independents - Centrist Union
Loire-Atlantique	Ronan Dantec	EÉLV	Ecologist
Loire-Atlantique	Joël Guerriau	UDI	Union of Democrats and Independents - Centrist Union
Loire-Atlantique	Michelle Meunier	PS	Socialist
Loire-Atlantique	André Trillard	UMP	Union for a Popular Movement
Loire-Atlantique	Yannick Vaugrenard	PS	Socialist
Loiret	Jean-Noël Cardoux	UMP	Union for a Popular Movement
Loiret	Éric Doligé	UMP	Union for a Popular Movement
Loiret	Jean-Pierre Sueur	PS	Socialist
Lot	Gérard Miquel	PS	Socialist
Lot	Jean-Claude Requier	PRG	European Democratic and Social Rally
Lot-et-Garonne	Pierre Camani	PS	Socialist
Lot-et-Garonne	Henri Tandonnet	UDI	Union of Democrats and Independents - Centrist Union
Lozère	Alain Bertrand	PS	European Democratic and Social Rally
Maine-et-Loire	Christophe Béchu	UMP	Union for a Popular Movement
Maine-et-Loire	Corinne Bouchoux	EÉLV	Ecologist
Maine-et-Loire	Catherine Deroche	UMP	Union for a Popular Movement
Maine-et-Loire	Daniel Raoul	PS	Socialist
Manche	Philippe Bas	UMP	Union for a Popular Movement
Manche	Jean Bizet	UMP	Union for a Popular Movement
Manche	Jean-Pierre Godefroy	PS	Socialist
Marne	Yves Détraigne	UDI	Union of Democrats and Independents - Centrist Union
Marne	Françoise Férat	UDI	Union of Democrats and Independents - Centrist Union
Marne	René-Paul Savary	UMP	Union for a Popular Movement
Haute-Marne	Charles Guené	UMP	Union for a Popular Movement
Haute-Marne	Bruno Sido	UMP	Union for a Popular Movement
Mayenne	Jean Arthuis	UDI	Union of Democrats and Independents - Centrist Union
Mayenne	François Zocchetto	UDI	Union of Democrats and Independents - Centrist Union
Meurthe-et-Moselle	Évelyne Didier	PCF	Communist, Republican, Citizen
Meurthe-et-Moselle	Jean-François Husson	DVD	Administrative Meeting For Senators Not On the List Of Another
Meurthe-et-Moselle	Philippe Nachbar	UMP	Union for a Popular Movement
Meurthe-et-Moselle	Daniel Reiner	PS	Socialist
Meuse	Gérard Longuet	UMP	Union for a Popular Movement
Meuse	Christian Namy	UDI	Union of Democrats and Independents - Centrist Union
Morbihan	Odette Herviaux	PS	Socialist
Morbihan	Joël Labbé	EÉLV	Ecologist
Morbihan	Michel Le Scouarnec	PCF	Communist, Republican, Citizen
Moselle	François Grosdidier	UMP	Union for a Popular Movement
Moselle	Philippe Leroy	UMP	Union for a Popular Movement
Moselle	Jean Louis Masson	DVD	Administrative Meeting For Senators Not On the List Of Another
Moselle	Gisèle Printz	PS	Socialist
Moselle	Jean-Marc Todeschini	PS	Socialist
Nièvre	Anne Emery-Dumas	PS	Socialist
Nièvre	Gaëtan Gorce	PS	Socialist
Nord	Dominique Bailly	PS	Socialist
Nord	Delphine Bataille	PS	Socialist
Nord	Marie-Christine Blandin	EÉLV	Ecologist
Nord	Éric Bocquet	PCF	Communist, Republican, Citizen
Nord	Michel Delebarre	PS	Socialist
Nord	Michelle Demessine	PCF	Communist, Republican, Citizen
Nord	Jean-René Lecerf	UMP	Union for a Popular Movement
Nord	Jacques Legendre	UMP	Union for a Popular Movement
Nord	Valérie Létard	UDI	Union of Democrats and Independents - Centrist Union
Nord	Alex Türk	DVD	Administrative Meeting For Senators Not On the List Of Another
Nord	René Vandierendonck	PS	Socialist
Oise	Caroline Cayeux	UMP	Union for a Popular Movement
Oise	Philippe Marini	UMP	Union for a Popular Movement
Oise	Yves Rome	PS	Socialist
Oise	Laurence Rossignol	PS	Socialist
Orne	Nathalie Goulet	UDI	Union of Democrats and Independents - Centrist Union
Orne	Jean-Claude Lenoir	UMP	Union for a Popular Movement
Pas-de-Calais	Natacha Bouchart	UMP	Union for a Popular Movement
Pas-de-Calais	Odette Duriez	PS	Socialist
Pas-de-Calais	Catherine Génisson	PS	Socialist
Pas-de-Calais	Jean-Claude Leroy	PS	Socialist
Pas-de-Calais	Daniel Percheron	PS	Socialist
Pas-de-Calais	Jean-Marie Vanlerenberghe	UDI	Union of Democrats and Independents - Centrist Union
Pas-de-Calais	Dominique Watrin	PCF	Communist, Republican, Citizen
Puy-de-Dôme	Michèle André	PS	Socialist
Puy-de-Dôme	Jacques-Bernard Magner	PS	Socialist
Puy-de-Dôme	Alain Néri	PS	Socialist
Pyrénées-Atlantiques	Frédérique Espagnac	PS	Socialist
Pyrénées-Atlantiques	Georges Labazée	PS	Socialist
Pyrénées-Atlantiques	Jean-Jacques Lasserre	MoDem	Union of Democrats and Independents - Centrist Union
Hautes-Pyrénées	Josette Durrieu	PS	Socialist
Hautes-Pyrénées	François Fortassin	PRG	European Democratic and Social Rally
Pyrénées-Orientales	Christian Bourquin	DVG	European Democratic and Social Rally
Pyrénées-Orientales	François Calvet	UMP	Union for a Popular Movement
Bas-Rhin	Francis Grignon	UMP	Union for a Popular Movement
Bas-Rhin	Fabienne Keller	UMP	Union for a Popular Movement
Bas-Rhin	André Reichardt	UMP	Union for a Popular Movement
Bas-Rhin	Roland Ries	PS	Socialist
Bas-Rhin	Esther Sittler	UMP	Union for a Popular Movement
Haut-Rhin	Jean-Marie Bockel	UDI	Union of Democrats and Independents - Centrist Union
Haut-Rhin	Jean-Louis Lorrain	UMP	Union for a Popular Movement
Haut-Rhin	Patricia Schillinger	PS	Socialist
Haut-Rhin	Catherine Troendle	UMP	Union for a Popular Movement
Rhône	François-Noël Buffet	UMP	Union for a Popular Movement
Rhône	Gérard Collomb	PS	Socialist
Rhône	Christiane Demontès	PS	Socialist
Rhône	Muguette Dini	UDI	Union of Democrats and Independents - Centrist Union
Rhône	Guy Fischer	PCF	Communist, Republican, Citizen
Rhône	Élisabeth Lamure	UMP	Union for a Popular Movement
Rhône	Michel Mercier	UDI	Union of Democrats and Independents - Centrist Union
Haute-Saône	Yves Krattinger	PS	Socialist
Haute-Saône	Jean-Pierre Michel	PS	Socialist
Saône-et-Loire	René Beaumont	UMP	Union for a Popular Movement
Saône-et-Loire	Jean-Patrick Courtois	UMP	Union for a Popular Movement
Saône-et-Loire	Jean-Paul Emorine	UMP	Union for a Popular Movement
Sarthe	Jean-Pierre Chauveau	UMP	Union for a Popular Movement
Sarthe	Marcel-Pierre Cléach	UMP	Union for a Popular Movement
Sarthe	Roland du Luart	UMP	Union for a Popular Movement
Savoie	Thierry Repentin	PS	Socialist
Savoie	Jean-Pierre Vial	UMP	Union for a Popular Movement
Haute-Savoie	Jean-Paul Amoudry	UDI	Union of Democrats and Independents - Centrist Union
Haute-Savoie	Jean-Claude Carle	UMP	Union for a Popular Movement
Haute-Savoie	Pierre Hérisson	UMP	Union for a Popular Movement
Paris	Leila Aïchi	EÉLV	Ecologist
Paris	David Assouline	PS	Socialist
Paris	Jean-Pierre Caffet	PS	Socialist
Paris	Pierre Charon	UMP	Union for a Popular Movement
Paris	Jean Desessard	EÉLV	Ecologist
Paris	Philippe Dominati	UMP	Union for a Popular Movement
Paris	Chantal Jouanno	UDI	Union of Democrats and Independents - Centrist Union
Paris	Bariza Khiari	PS	Socialist
Paris	Pierre Laurent	PCF	Communist, Republican, Citizen
Paris	Marie-Noëlle Lienemann	PS	Socialist
Paris	Roger Madec	PS	Socialist
Paris	Yves Pozzo di Borgo	UDI	Union of Democrats and Independents - Centrist Union
Seine-Maritime	Thierry Foucaud	PCF	Communist, Republican, Citizen
Seine-Maritime	Patrice Gélard	UMP	Union for a Popular Movement
Seine-Maritime	Alain Le Vern	PS	Socialist
Seine-Maritime	Marc Massion	PS	Socialist
Seine-Maritime	Catherine Morin-Desailly	UDI	Union of Democrats and Independents - Centrist Union
Seine-Maritime	Charles Revet	UMP	Union for a Popular Movement
Seine-et-Marne	Michel Billout	PCF	Communist, Republican, Citizen
Seine-et-Marne	Vincent Eblé	PS	Socialist
Seine-et-Marne	Michel Houel	UMP	Union for a Popular Movement
Seine-et-Marne	Jean-Jacques Hyest	UMP	Union for a Popular Movement
Seine-et-Marne	Hélène Lipietz	EÉLV	Ecologist
Seine-et-Marne	Colette Mélot	UMP	Union for a Popular Movement
Yvelines	Marie-Annick Duchêne	UMP	Union for a Popular Movement
Yvelines	Philippe Esnol	PS	Socialist
Yvelines	Alain Gournac	UMP	Union for a Popular Movement
Yvelines	Gérard Larcher	UMP	Union for a Popular Movement
Yvelines	Sophie Primas	UMP	Union for a Popular Movement
Yvelines	Catherine Tasca	PS	Socialist
Deux-Sèvres	Michel Bécot	UMP	Union for a Popular Movement
Deux-Sèvres	André Dulait	UMP	Union for a Popular Movement
Somme	Marcel Deneux	UDI	Union of Democrats and Independents - Centrist Union
Somme	Daniel Dubois	UDI	Union of Democrats and Independents - Centrist Union
Somme	Pierre Martin	UMP	Union for a Popular Movement
Tarn	Jacqueline Alquier	PS	Socialist
Tarn	Jean-Marc Pastor	PS	Socialist
Tarn-et-Garonne	Jean-Michel Baylet	PRG	European Democratic and Social Rally
Tarn-et-Garonne	Yvon Collin	PRG	European Democratic and Social Rally
Var	Pierre-Yves Collombat	PS	European Democratic and Social Rally
Var	Hubert Falco	UMP	Union for a Popular Movement
Var	Christiane Hummel	UMP	Union for a Popular Movement
Var	François Trucy	UMP	Union for a Popular Movement
Vaucluse	Alain Dufaut	UMP	Union for a Popular Movement
Vaucluse	Claude Haut	PS	Socialist
Vaucluse	Alain Milon	UMP	Union for a Popular Movement
Vendée	Philippe Darniche	MPF	Administrative Meeting For Senators Not On the List Of Another
Vendée	Jean-Claude Merceron	UDI	Union of Democrats and Independents - Centrist Union
Vendée	Bruno Retailleau	UMP	Union for a Popular Movement
Vienne	Alain Fouché	UMP	Union for a Popular Movement
Vienne	Jean-Pierre Raffarin	UMP	Union for a Popular Movement
Haute-Vienne	Jean-Pierre Demerliat	PS	Socialist
Haute-Vienne	Jean-Claude Peyronnet	PS	Socialist
Vosges	Jackie Pierre	UMP	Union for a Popular Movement
Vosges	Christian Poncelet	UMP	Union for a Popular Movement
Yonne	Pierre Bordier	UMP	Union for a Popular Movement
Yonne	Henri de Raincourt	UMP	Union for a Popular Movement
Territoire de Belfort	Jean-Pierre Chevènement	MRC	European Democratic and Social Rally
Essonne	Michel Berson	PS	Socialist
Essonne	Claire-Lise Campion	PS	Socialist
Essonne	Serge Dassault	UMP	Union for a Popular Movement
Essonne	Vincent Delahaye	UDI	Union of Democrats and Independents - Centrist Union
Essonne	Jean-Vincent Placé	EÉLV	Ecologist
Hauts-de-Seine	Isabelle Debré	UMP	Union for a Popular Movement
Hauts-de-Seine	André Gattolin	EÉLV	Ecologist
Hauts-de-Seine	Jacques Gautier	UMP	Union for a Popular Movement
Hauts-de-Seine	Brigitte Gonthier-Maurin	PCF	Communist, Republican, Citizen
Hauts-de-Seine	Philippe Kaltenbach	PS	Socialist
Hauts-de-Seine	Roger Karoutchi	UMP	Union for a Popular Movement
Hauts-de-Seine	Hervé Marseille	UDI	Union of Democrats and Independents - Centrist Union
Seine-Saint-Denis	Aline Archimbaud	EÉLV	Ecologist
Seine-Saint-Denis	Éliane Assassi	PCF	Communist, Republican, Citizen
Seine-Saint-Denis	Vincent Capo-Canellas	UDI	Union of Democrats and Independents - Centrist Union
Seine-Saint-Denis	Philippe Dallier	UMP	Union for a Popular Movement
Seine-Saint-Denis	Claude Dilain	PS	Socialist
Seine-Saint-Denis	Gilbert Roger	PS	Socialist
Val-de-Marne	Esther Benbassa	EÉLV	Ecologist
Val-de-Marne	Christian Cambon	UMP	Union for a Popular Movement
Val-de-Marne	Luc Carvounas	PS	Socialist
Val-de-Marne	Laurence Cohen	PCF	Communist, Republican, Citizen
Val-de-Marne	Christian Favier	PCF	Communist, Republican, Citizen
Val-de-Marne	Catherine Procaccia	UMP	Union for a Popular Movement
Val-d'Oise	Francis Delattre	UMP	Union for a Popular Movement
Val-d'Oise	Dominique Gillot	PS	Socialist
Val-d'Oise	Robert Hue	MUP	European Democratic and Social Rally
Val-d'Oise	Hugues Portelli	UMP	Union for a Popular Movement
Val-d'Oise	Alain Richard	PS	Socialist
Guadeloupe	Jacques Cornano	DVG	Socialist
Guadeloupe	Félix Desplan	PS	Socialist
Guadeloupe	Jacques Gillot	GUSR	Socialist
Martinique	Maurice Antiste	DVG	Socialist
Martinique	Serge Larcher	PPM	Socialist
Guyane	Jean-Étienne Antoinette	Walwari	Socialist
Guyane	Georges Patient	DVG	Socialist
La Réunion	Jacqueline Farreyrol	UMP	Union for a Popular Movement
La Réunion	Michel Fontaine	UMP	Union for a Popular Movement
La Réunion	Paul Vergès	PCR	Communist, Republican, Citizen
La Réunion	Michel Vergoz	PS	Socialist
Saint Pierre and Miquelon	Karine Claireaux	PS	Socialist
Mayotte	Thani Mohamed Soilihi	PS	Socialist
Mayotte	Abdourahamane Soilihi	UMP	Union for a Popular Movement
Wallis and Futuna	Robert Laufoaulu	UMP	Union for a Popular Movement
French Polynesia	Gaston Flosse	Tahoera'a Huiraatira	Administrative Meeting For Senators Not On the List Of Another
French Polynesia	Richard Tuheiava	Tavini Huiraatira	Socialist
New Caledonia	Pierre Frogier	R-UMP	Union for a Popular Movement
New Caledonia	Hilarion Vendégou	R-UMP	Union for a Popular Movement
French residents overseas	Kalliopi Ango Ela	EÉLV	Ecologist
French residents overseas	Jean-Pierre Cantegrit	UMP	Union for a Popular Movement
French residents overseas	Christian Cointat	UMP	Union for a Popular Movement
French residents overseas	Hélène Conway-Mouret	PS	Socialist
French residents overseas	Robert del Picchia	UMP	Union for a Popular Movement
French residents overseas	Louis Duvernois	UMP	Union for a Popular Movement
French residents overseas	André Ferrand	UMP	Union for a Popular Movement
French residents overseas	Christophe-André Frassa	UMP	Union for a Popular Movement
French residents overseas	Joëlle Garriaud-Maylam	UMP	Union for a Popular Movement
French residents overseas	Christiane Kammermann	UMP	Union for a Popular Movement
French residents overseas	Jean-Yves Leconte	PS	Socialist
French residents overseas	Claudine Lepage	PS	Socialist
French residents overseas	Richard Yung	PS	Socialist

== See also ==
- Senate of France
