= 2012 Union for a Popular Movement leadership election =

Union for a Popular Movement leadership election
- 18 November 2012
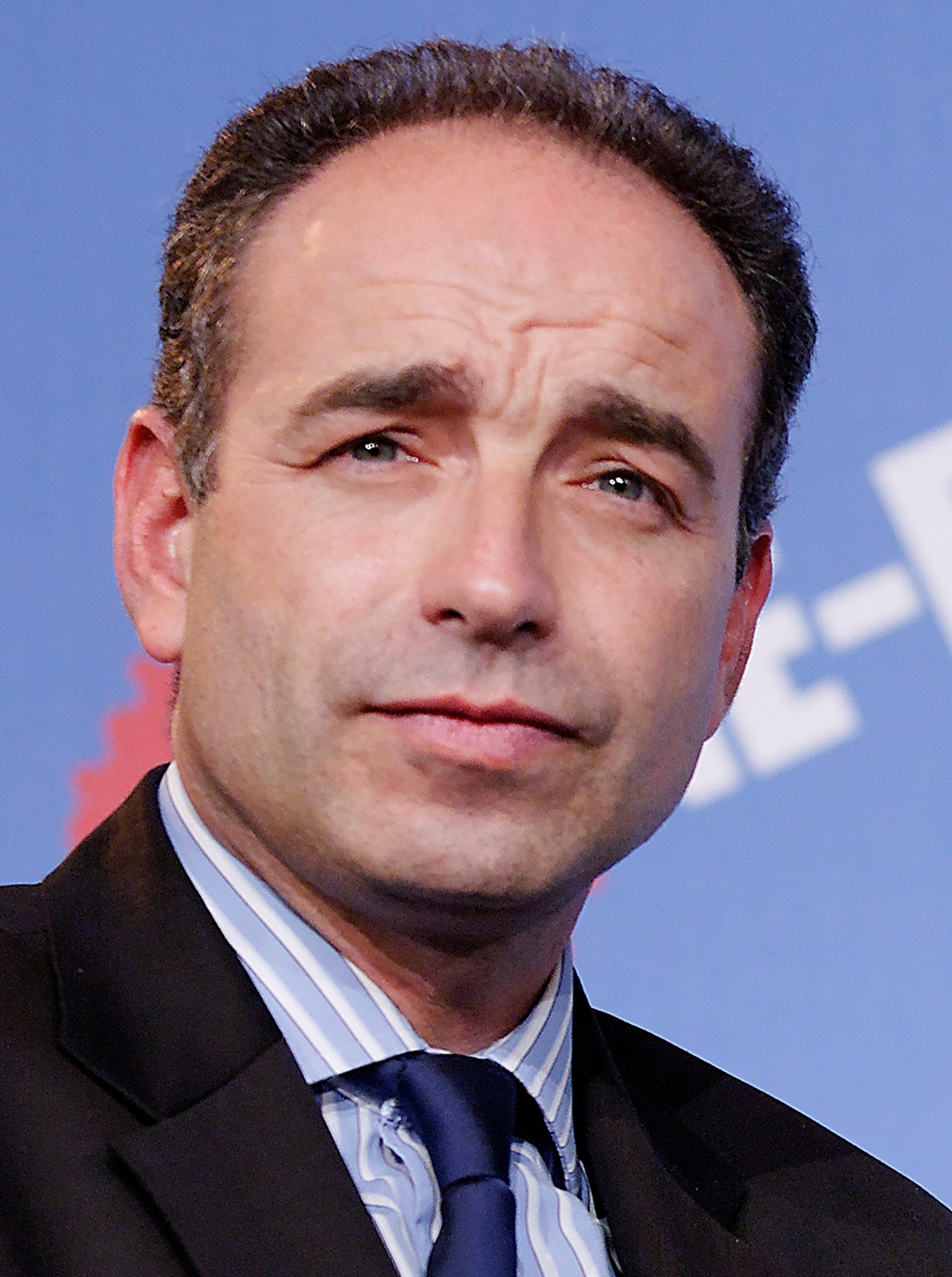

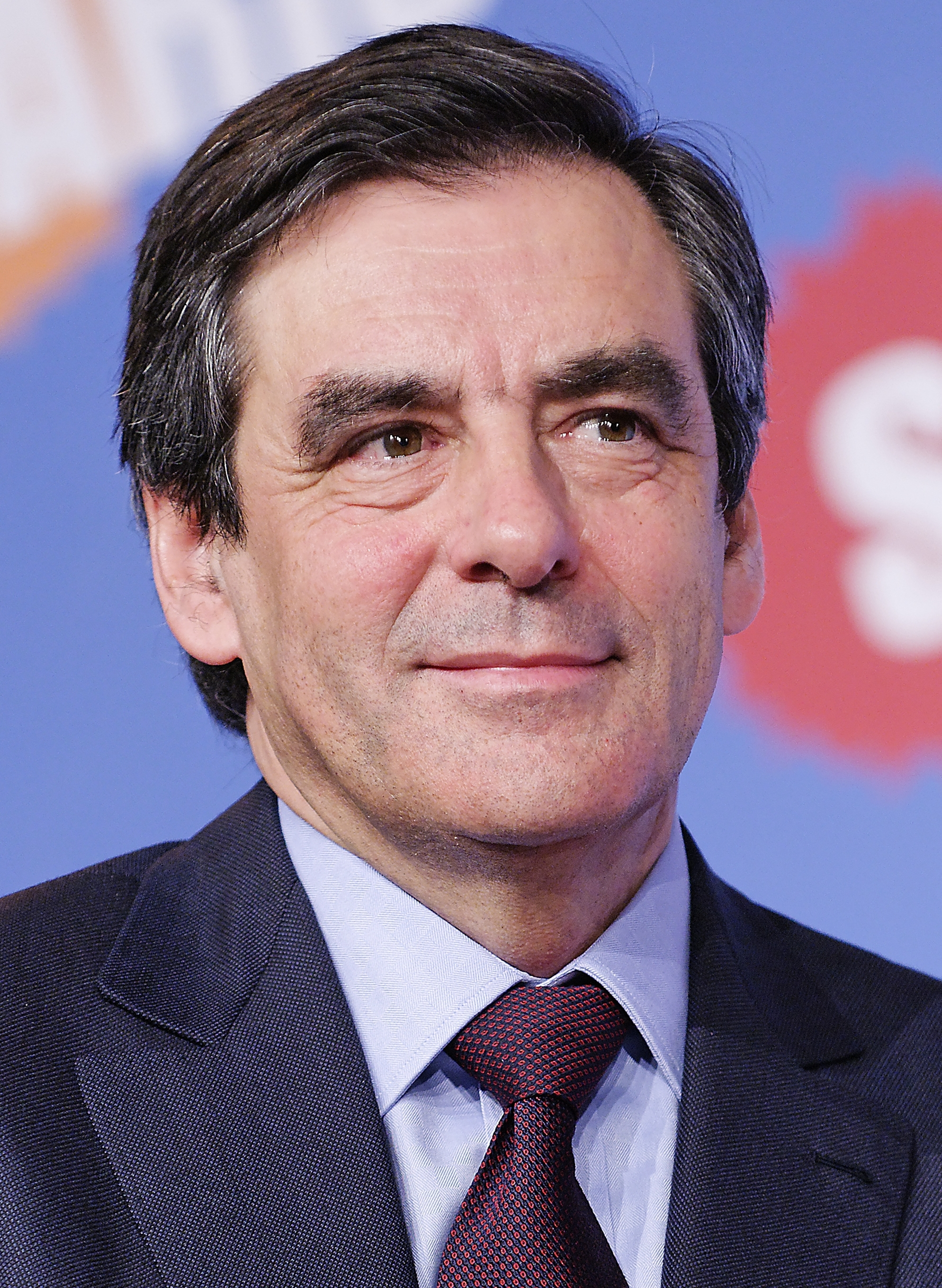
Candidate	Jean-François Copé	François Fillon
Popular vote	86,911	85,959
Percentage	50.28%	49.72%
President before election
None
Nicolas Sarkozy
(Last President)
Elected President
Jean-François Copé

The 2012 leadership election of the Union for a Popular Movement (UMP), a political party in France was held on 18 November 2012. It renewed the leadership structures of the UMP following Nicolas Sarkozy's defeat in the 2012 presidential election and the party's defeat in the subsequent legislative election. The disputed results led to the first open crisis in the UMP since its creation in 2002.

Incumbent General Secretary Jean-François Copé defeated former Prime Minister François Fillon.

== Organization ==
While the UMP's two previous congresses in 2002 and 2004 had been held at the Bourget, there was no physical congress organized in 2012 and the congress was decentralized in each departmental federation of the UMP.

=== Presidency of the UMP ===
Nicolas Sarkozy was the UMP's last president, between 2004 and 2007. Following his election to the presidency of France in 2007, the UMP modified its statutes to create a collegial presidency led by a secretary-general during the duration of his term in office. His defeat meant that the UMP needed to hold a new presidential election.

Candidates seeking to run for the party presidency needed to win the endorsements of at least 3% of party members (as of 30 June 2012), or 7,924 members, from at least 10 different departmental federations. Each candidate created a "ticket" with two other party members for the offices of vice-president and secretary-general of the UMP.

Candidacies, including all endorsements, were due before 18 September 2012.

=== Presidential candidates ===
Name, age	Details and notes
Jean-François Copé (62)	Secretary-general of the UMP (since 2010); Mayor of Meaux (1995-2002, 2005–present); Deputy for the Seine-et-Marne's 6th constituency (2002, 2007–present); President of the UMP Group in the French National Assembly (2007-2010); Spokesperson of the Government of France (2002-2007); Junior Minister of the Budget (2004-2007); Junior Minister of the Interior (2004); Secretary of State for Relations with Parliament (2002-2004); Deputy for the Seine-et-Marne's 5th constituency (1995-1997); Candidate for Vice President: Luc Chatel (48 years old), mayor of Chaumont, deputy for Haute-Marne's 1st constituency and former cabinet minister; Candidate for Secretary-General: Michèle Tabarot (49 years old), mayor of Le Cannet and deputy for the Alpes-Maritimes's 1st constituency; Supporters Deputies: Yves Albarello, Nicole Ameline, Julien Aubert, Olivier Audibert-Troin, Patrick Balkany, Jean-Pierre Barbier, Étienne Blanc, Jean-Claude Bouchet, Philippe Briand, Gilles Carrez, Yves Censi, Gérard Cherpion, Alain Chrétien, Philippe Cochet, Édouard Courtial, Olivier Dassault, Marc-Philippe Daubresse, Marie-Christine Dalloz, Bernard Deflesselles, Lucien Degauchy, Nicolas Dhuicq, Jean-Pierre Door, Georges Fenech, Marie-Louise Fort, Marc Francina, Laurent Furst, Yves Fromion, Sauveur Gandolfi-Scheit, Bernard Gérard, Claude Goasguen, Jean-Pierre Gorges, Philippe Gosselin, Henri Guaino, Christophe Guilloteau, Michel Herbillon, Guénhaël Huet, Sébastien Huyghe, Christian Jacob (president of the UMP Group), Denis Jacquat, Christian Kert, Jacques Kossowski, Patrick Labaune, Valérie Lacroute, Marc Laffineur, Marc Le Fur, Pierre Lequiller, Lionnel Luca, Jean-François Mancel, Laurent Marcangeli, Thierry Mariani, Franck Marlin, Alain Marsaud, Philippe Meunier, Pierre Morel-A-L'Huissier, Alain Moyne-Bressand, Yves Nicolin, Henri Plagnol, Jean-Frédéric Poisson, Axel Poniatowski, Josette Pons, Didier Quentin, Bernard Reynès, Franck Riester, Claudine Schmid, André Schneider, Fernand Siré, Thierry Solère, Eric Straumann, Jean-Marie Tétart, Jean-Charles Taugourdeau, Dominique Tian, Catherine Vautrin, Philippe Vitel, Marie-Jo Zimmermann Senators: Michel Bécot, François Calvet, Jean-Claude Carle, Pierre Charon, Christian Cointat, Serge Dassault, Francis Delattre, Marie-Hélène des Esgaulx, André Dulait, Louis-Constant Fleming, Jean-Paul Fournier, Christophe-André Frassa, Pierre Frogier, Joëlle Garriaud-Maylam, Jean-Claude Gaudin (président du groupe UMP au Sénat), Bruno Gilles, Michel Houel, Jean-Jacques Hyest, Sophie Joissains, Roger Karoutchi, Marc Laménie, Jean-Louis Lorrain, Colette Mélot, Michel Magras, Philippe Marini, Jean-Pierre Raffarin (ancien Premier ministre), René-Paul Savary, Catherine Troendlé. Members of the European Parliament: Jean-Pierre Audy, Rachida Dati, Françoise Grossetête, Brice Hortefeux, Philippe Juvin, Agnès Le Brun, Constance Le Grip, Franck Proust, Jean Roatta, Dominique Vlasto. Other figures: Isabelle Balkany, Bruno Beschizza, Charles Beigbeder, Christine Boutin, Françoise Branget, Françoise Briand, Chantal Brunel, François Commeinhes, Grégoire Chertok, Geoffroy Didier, Jérôme Dubus, Emmanuel Hamelin, Maryse Joissains-Masini, Brigitte Kuster, François Lebel, Jean-Pierre Lecoq, Daniel Mach, Marie-Anne Montchamp, Nadine Morano, Étienne Mourrut, Hervé Novelli, Guillaume Peltier, Éric Raoult, Marie-Josée Roig, Valérie Rosso-Debord, Jean-Marc Roubaud, Salima Saa, Jean Sarkozy, Catherine Soullie, Olivier Stirn, Chenva Tieu, David-Xavier Weiss.
François Fillon (72)	Deputy for Paris's 2nd constituency (2012–present); Former Prime Minister (2007-2012); Deputy for the Sarthe's 4th constituency (1981-1993, 1997-2002, 2002, 2007, 2012); Minister of the Environment, Sustainable Development, Transportation and Housing (2012); Senator for the Sarthe (2005-2007); Minister of National Education, Higher Education and Research (2004-2005); Minister of Social Affairs, Labour and Solidarity (2002-2004); President of the Regional Council of the Pays de la Loire (1998-2002); Mayor of Sablé-sur-Sarthe (1983-2001); President of the General Council of the Sarthe (1992-1998); Junior Minister for Posts, Telecommunications and Space (1995-1997); Minister of Information Technologies and Posts (1995); Minister of Higher Education and Research (1993-1995); Candidate for Vice President: Laurent Wauquiez (37 years old), mayor of Le Puy-en-Velay, deputy for Haute-Loire's 1st constituency and former cabinet minister; Candidate for Secretary-General: Valérie Pécresse (45 years old), deputy for the Yvelines's 2nd constituency and former cabinet minister; Supporters Deputies: Bernard Accoyer, Benoist Apparu, François Baroin, Jacques-Alain Bénisti, Xavier Bertrand, Marcel Bonnot, Bruno Bourg-Broc, Valérie Boyer, Xavier Breton, Bernard Brochand, Dominique Bussereau, Jérôme Chartier, Dino Cinieri, Guillaume Chevrollier, Jean-Louis Christ, Éric Ciotti, Jean-Michel Couve, Gérald Darmanin, Bernard Debré, Rémi Delatte, Patrick Devedjian, Sophie Dion, David Douillet, Dominique Dord, Marianne Dubois, Christian Estrosi, Hervé Gaymard, Annie Genevard, Guy Geoffroy, Georges Ginesta, Charles-Ange Ginésy, Jean-Pierre Giran, Philippe Goujon, Claude Greff, Anne Grommerch, Serge Grouard, Arlette Grosskost, Françoise Guégot, Jean-Claude Guibal, Jean-Jacques Guillet, Michel Heinrich, Patrick Hetzel, Philippe Houillon, Jean-François Lamour, Thierry Lazaro, Isabelle Le Callennec, Dominique Le Mèner, Alain Leboeuf, Pierre Lellouche, Jean Léonetti, Céleste Lett, Geneviève Levy, Véronique Louwagie, Gilles Lurton, Alain Marc, Alain Marleix, Philippe Armand Martin, Alain Marty, Damien Meslot, Jean-Claude Mignon, Jacques Myard, Patrick Ollier, Bernard Perrut, Michel Piron, Bérengère Poletti, Christophe Priou, Frédéric Reiss, Arnaud Robinet, Camille de Rocca Serra, Sophie Rohfritsch, Paul Salen, Jean-Marie Sermier, Michel Sordi, Claude Sturni, Lionel Tardy, Guy Teissier, Michel Terrot, François Vannson, Charles de la Verpillière, Jean-Sébastien Vialatte, Jean-Pierre Vigier, Michel Voisin, Éric Woerth. Senators: Pierre André, Gérard Bailly, Philippe Bas, Christophe Béchu, Claude Belot, Jean Bizet, Pierre Bordier, Natacha Bouchart, Joël Bourdin, Marie-Thérèse Bruguière, François-Noël Buffet, Christian Cambon Jean-Noël Cardoux, Caroline Cayeux, Gérard César, Jean-Pierre Chauveau, Marcel-Pierre Cléach, Jean-Patrick Courtois, Philippe Dallier, Isabelle Debré, Gérard Dériot, Catherine Deroche, Éric Doligé, Michel Doublet, Marie-Annick Duchêne, Louis Duvernois, Hubert Falco, Michel Fontaine, Bernard Fournier, Yann Gaillard, René Garrec, Jacques Gautier, Colette Giudicelli, Alain Gournac, Francis Grignon, François Grosdidier, Charles Guené, Pierre Hérisson, Alain Houpert, Christiane Hummel, Chantal Jouanno, Christiane Kammermann, Fabienne Keller, Élisabeth Lamure, Gérard Larcher, Daniel Laurent, Jean-René Lecerf, Jacques Legendre Dominique de Legge, Jean-Pierre Leleux, Jean-Claude Lenoir, Gérard Longuet, Roland du Luart, Alain Milon, Louis Nègre, Philippe Paul, Jackie Pierre, François Pillet, Louis Pinton, Rémy Pointereau, Christian Poncelet, Hugues Portelli, Sophie Primas, Catherine Procaccia, Henri de Raincourt, André Reichardt, Bruno Retailleau, Michel Savin, Bruno Sido, Esther Sittler, François Trucy, Jean-Pierre Vial. Members of the European Parliament: Nora Berra, Philippe Boulland, Alain Cadec, Arnaud Danjean, Michel Dantin, Joseph Daul, Gaston Franco, Jean-Paul Gauzès, Alain Lamassoure, Véronique Mathieu, Élisabeth Morin-Chartier, Maurice Ponga, Tokia Saïfi, Marie-Thérèse Sanchez-Schmid Others figures: Gérard d'Aboville, Martine Aurillac, Roselyne Bachelot, Pierre-Christophe Baguet, Édouard Balladur, Brigitte Barèges, Éric Berdoati, Éric Besson, Bernard Bonne, Michel Bouvard, Patrice Calméjane, Jean Castex, Joëlle Ceccaldi-Raynaud, Jean-François Chossy, Geneviève Colot, Alain Cousin, Jean-Yves Cousin, Daniel Dugléry, Catherine Dumas, Bernard Dupont, Christian Dupuy, Jean-Claude Étienne, Jean-Marie Geveaux, Danièle Giazzi, François Goulard, Claude Guéant, Françoise Hostalier, Alain Joyandet, Patrick Karam, François Kosciusko-Morizet, Marguerite Lamour, Benjamin Lancar, Henriette Martinez, Pierre Méhaignerie, Béatrice Pavy, Philippe Pemezec, Marie-Luce Penchard, Jérôme Peyrat, Étienne Pinte, Alain Pompidou, Jean-Paul Pourquier, Philippe Richert, Stéphan Rossignol, Francis Saint-Léger, Fabien de Sans-Nicolas, Jean-Pierre Schosteck, Jean-Yves Sénant, Georges Siffredi, Jean Tiberi, Claude-Annick Tissot, Marie-Hélène Thoraval, Gérard Trémège

==== Unsuccessful presidential candidates ====
- Henri Guaino, deputy of the Yvelines's 3rd constituency, declared his candidacy on 3 September.
- Nathalie Kosciusko-Morizet, mayor of Longjumeau, deputy for the Essonne's 4th constituency and former cabinet minister, announced that she had about 7000 endorsements as of 18 September and criticized the candidacy requirements.
- Bruno Le Maire, deputy for the Eure's 1st constituency and former cabinet minister, also claimed around 7200 endorsements on 18 September.
- Julien Amador, Dominique Hamdad-Vitré, Philippe Herlin and Jean-Michel Simonian, grassroots party members could never hope to win the required endorsements.

==== Dropped out ====
- François Baroin, mayor of Troyes, deputy for the Aube's 3rd constituency and former cabinet minister did not, ultimately, run and endorsed Fillon.
- Xavier Bertrand, mayor Saint-Quentin, deputy for the Aisne's 2nd constituency and former cabinet minister announced that he was dropping out on 16 September although he claimed 8200 endorsements. He claimed he was dropping out to run in the 2016 primaries which will nominate the party's candidate in the 2017 presidential election.
- Dominique Dord, mayor of Aix-les-Bains, deputy for the Savoie's 1st constituency and treasurer of the UMP announced his candidacy in July 2012 but dropped out on 22 August 2012, lacking endorsements.
- Christian Estrosi, mayor of Nice, deputy for the Alpes-Maritimes' 5th constituency and formed cabinet minister. He dropped out in September 2012 and endorsed Fillon.
- Alain Juppé, mayor of Bordeaux, former president of the UMP (2002-2004) and former Prime Minister (1995-1997) was seen as a compromise candidate to prevent a Copé-Fillon battle. In July 2012 he announced that he would not run if Jean-François Copé and François Fillon ran and that he would not endorse any candidate.

=== Movements ===
The UMP's original statutes in 2002 allowed for the organization of formal factions or movements within the party, to represent the various political families of which it was made up. However, fearing leadership rivalries and divisions, Juppé, Chirac and later Sarkozy 'postponed' the creation of such organized movements indefinitely. Nevertheless, prior to the organizations of formal "movements" in November 2012, there existed informal groupings of like-minded members, either through associations, political clubs, associated political parties or even informal factions.

Prior to Sarkozy's defeat on 6 May, the UMP's secretary-general Jean-François Copé announced that he supported the creation of internal "movements" within the party and the organization of primaries for the next presidential election.

Jean-François Copé allowed for the organization of formal movements within the party following the congress. According to the party's statutes, motions backed by at least 10 parliamentarians from 10 departmental federations and which obtain at least 10% support from members at a congress are recognized as movements. They are granted financial autonomy by way of a fixed grant and additional funding in proportion to the votes they obtained; but the sum of funds transferred by the party to its movements can be no larger than 30% of the annual public subsidies the UMP receives from the state.

==== Valid motions (declarations of principles) ====
Six motions representing various ideological tendencies within the party ran to be recognized as official movements following the November 2012 congress.

- The Strong Right (La Droite forte) led by Geoffroy Didier and Guillaume Peltier
- The Social Right (La Droite sociale) led by Laurent Wauquiez
- Modern and Humanist France (France moderne et humaniste) led by Luc Chatel, Jean Leonetti, Jean-Pierre Raffarin and Marc Laffineur
- Gaullism, a way forward for France (Le Gaullisme, une voie d'avenir pour la France) led by Michèle Alliot-Marie, Henri Guaino, Roger Karoutchi and Patrick Ollier
- The Popular Right (La Droite populaire) led by Thierry Mariani
- The Box of Ideas (La Boîte à idées) led by Maël de Calan, Enguerrand Delannoy, Matthieu Schlesinger and Pierre-Emmanuel Thiard

=== Charter of Values ===
Members were also called to approve or reject amendments to the party's charter of values.

== Campaign ==
The campaign between Fillon and Copé lasted two months. Fillon had a strong lead in polls of UMP 'sympathizers' (as opposed to actual members, who would be the only eligible voters) and was backed by most UMP parliamentarians while Copé claimed he was the candidate of party activists rather than party 'barons'. However, Copé remained as secretary-general and retained control of the party machinery.

While Fillon's campaign was regarded as more consensual, moderate and centre-right; Copé campaigned as the candidate of the droite décomplexée ('uninhibited right') and introduced issues such as anti-white racism. However, both candidates received support from moderate and conservative members of the party and their main differences were in rhetoric, style and temperament. Copé, again, appeared more militant and activist, saying that he would support and participate in street demonstrations while Fillon disagreed with his rival.

== Results ==
=== COCOE results ===
The vote on 18 November saw high turnout but was quickly marred by allegations of irregularities and potential fraud on both sides. Both candidates proclaimed victory within 20 minutes of each other on the night of the vote.

24 hours later, the control commission in charge of the vote (COCOE) announced Copé's victory by only 98 votes.

UMP leadership election results (COCOE, 19 November)
Party	Candidate	Votes	%
UMP	Jean-François Copé / Luc Chatel and Michèle Tabarot	87 388	50.03
UMP	François Fillon / Laurent Wauquiez and Valérie Pécresse	87 290	49.97
Total votes		174 678	100.00
Turnout		176 608	54.35

While Fillon initially conceded defeat, by 21 November his campaign claimed victory anew, with a 26-vote advantage over Copé. Fillon's campaign argued that the COCOE had failed to take into account votes cast in three overseas federations.

=== CONARE/CNR results ===
Alain Juppé accepted to lead a mediation between both candidates on 23 November, but it failed within two days. Fillon's announced "precautionary seizure" of ballots cast "to protect them from tampering or alteration" and threatened to take the matter to court.

On 26 November, the party appeals commission (CONARE or CNR) - led by a close supporter of Copé - decided in Copé's favour and rejected Fillon's arguments. The CNR voided the results in three precincts favourable to Fillon (two in Nice, the other was New Caledonia) and reintegrated the results from Mayotte and Wallis-et-Futuna.

UMP leadership election results (CNR, 26 November)
Party	Candidate	Votes	%
UMP	Jean-François Copé / Luc Chatel and Michèle Tabarot	86 911	50.28
UMP	François Fillon / Laurent Wauquiez and Valérie Pécresse	85 959	49.72
Total votes		172 870	100.00

=== Movements ===
UMP motions vote result
Party	Candidate	Votes	%
UMP	The Strong Right	41 758	27.77
UMP	The Social Right	32 609	21.29
UMP	Modern and Humanist France	27 311	18.17
UMP	Gaullism, a way forward for France	18 504	12.31
UMP	The Popular Right	18 504	12.31
UMP	The Box of Ideas	13 822	9.19
Total votes		150 348	100.00
Turnout		168 833	51.96

== Crisis ==
On 27 November, 72 filloniste parliamentarians in the National Assembly announced the creation of a new parliamentary group, the Rassemblement-UMP, led by Fillon. Copé took up former President Nicolas Sarkozy's proposal of organizing a referendum on a revote, but he saw the creation of the dissident filloniste group as a casus belli and took back his proposal. Luc Chatel, the new vice-president and a Copé supporter, later announced that he supported a new presidential vote and a modification of party statutes. The next day, Copé announced that he favoured organizing a referendum the modification of party statutes and a reduction of his own term as president to two years (until November 2014); while Fillon welcomed the "consensus on the organization of a new election" he rejected his rival's timeline and called for a new election before 2014. 'Unaligned' members of the UMP led by Bruno Le Maire and Nathalie Kosciusko-Morizet appealed for the organization of a new election in the spring of 2013 and a reform of the party statutes.

=== Resolution ===
Both rivals reached an agreement at the end of December 2012, with Copé agreeing to the organization of a new election and a modification of party statutes while Fillon agreed to dissolve his parliamentary group.

The party's leadership was reorganized in January 2013 to accommodate Copé and Fillon's supporters: Laurent Wauquiez and Valérie Pécresse joined Luc Chatel and Michèle Tabarot as vice-president and secretary-general respectively. Christian Estrosi, Gérard Longuet, Henri de Raincourt (pro-Fillon), Jean-Claude Gaudin, Brice Hortefeux and Roger Karoutchi (pro-Copé) also became vice-presidents. Other positions in the party hierarchy were divided between supporters of both candidates. New leaders were also nominated in February 2013.
