= List of senators of Hérault =

Location of Hérault in France

Following is a list of senators of Hérault, people who have represented the department of Hérault in the Senate of France.

== Third Republic ==
Senators for Hérault under the French Third Republic were:

- Eustache Bonafous (1876–1879)
- Marie Théophile (Rodez-Benavent) (1876–1879)
- Jules Pagézy (1876–1879)
- Jean Bazille (1879–1888)
- Charles Griffe (1879–1895)
- Jean Combescure (1879–1897)
- Eugène Lisbonne (1888–1891)
- Jean Galtier (1891–1904)
- Élisée Déandréis (1895–1906)
- Ernest Perréal (1897–1906)
- Jules Razimbaud (1904–1915)
- Casimir Delhon (1906–1920)
- Louis Nègre (1906–1920)
- Louis Lafferre (1920–1924)
- Paul Pelisse (1920–1938)
- Marius Roustan (1920–1940)
- Camille Reboul (1924–1939)
- Pierre Masse (1939–1940)
- Auguste Albertini (1939–1940)

== Fourth Republic ==
Senators for Hérault under the French Fourth Republic were:

- Joseph Aussel (1946–1948)
- Joseph Lazare (1946–1948)
- Jean Bène (1946–1959)
- Édouard Barthe (1948–1949)
- Émile Claparède (1948–1959)
- Jean Péridier (1949–1959)

== Fifth Republic ==
Senators for Hérault under the French Fifth Republic:

Period	Name	Party or group	Notes
1959–1962	Émile Claparède	Groupe de la Gauche Démocratique	
1959–1962	Jean Bène	Groupe socialiste	
1959–1962	Jean Péridier	Groupe socialiste	
1962–1971	Émile Claparède	Groupe de la Gauche Démocratique	Died August 1967
1962–1971	Pierre Brousse (1968–1976)	Groupe de la Gauche Démocratique	From September 1968
1962–1971	Jean Bène	Groupe socialiste	
1962–1971	Jean Péridier	Groupe socialiste	
1971–1980	Jean Péridier	Groupe socialiste	
1971–1980	Pierre Brousse	Groupe de la Gauche Démocratique	Joined cabinet September 1976
1971–1980	Gabriel Calmels	Groupe de la Gauche Démocratique	Replaced Pierre Brousse September 1976; Died September 1979
1971–1980	Charles Alliès	Groupe socialiste	
1980–1989	Jules Faigt	Groupe socialiste	
1980–1989	Marcel Vidal	Groupe socialiste	
1980–1989	Gérard Delfau	Groupe du Rassemblement Démocratique et Social Européen	
1989–1998	Gérard Delfau	Groupe du Rassemblement Démocratique et Social Européen	
1989–1998	André Vézinhet	Groupe socialiste	
1989–1998	Marcel Vidal	Groupe socialiste	
1998–2008	Gérard Delfau	Groupe du Rassemblement Démocratique et Social Européen	
1998–2008	Marcel Vidal	Groupe socialiste	Died July 2006
1998–2008	Robert Tropéano	Groupe du Rassemblement Démocratique et Social Européen	Replaced Marcel Vidal in July 2006
1998–2008	André Vézinhet	Groupe socialiste	Elected deputy in June 2007
1998–2008	Raymond Couderc	Groupe Union pour un Mouvement Populaire	Elected August 2007
2008–2014	Marie-Thérèse Bruguière	Groupe Les Républicains	
2008–2014	Raymond Couderc	Groupe Union pour un Mouvement Populaire	
2008–2014	Robert Tropéano	Groupe du Rassemblement Démocratique et Social Européen	
2008–2014	Robert Navarro	Divers gauche (DVG)	
From 2014	Robert Navarro	Divers gauche (DVG)	
From 2014	François Commeinhes	Union pour un mouvement populaire (UMP)	resigned 2017
From 2014	Marie-Thérèse Bruguière	Groupe Les Républicains	from October 2017 - replaced François Commeinhes)
From 2014	Jean-Pierre Grand	DVD	
From 2014	Henri Cabanel	Parti socialiste (France) (PS)	

== Sources ==
- Liste des anciens sénateurs de la IIIème République par circonscription (in French), Sénat de France
- Liste des anciens sénateurs de la IVème République par circonscription (in French), Sénat de France
- Liste des anciens sénateurs de la Vème République par circonscription (in French), Sénat de France
- Liste par département - Hérault (in French), Sénat de France
