= Christian Gaudin =

Christian Gaudin may refer to:

- Christian Gaudin (politician) (born 1950), member of the Senate of France
- Christian Gaudin (handballer) (born 1967), French team handball player
- Christian Gaudin (film editor), French film editor
