= Billout =

Billout is a surname. Notable people with the surname include:

- Guy Billout (born 1941), French artist and illustrator
- Michel Billout (born 1958), French politician
