= Gaullism, a way forward for France =

French political movement

Gaullism, a way forward for France Le Gaullisme, une voie d'avenir pour la France
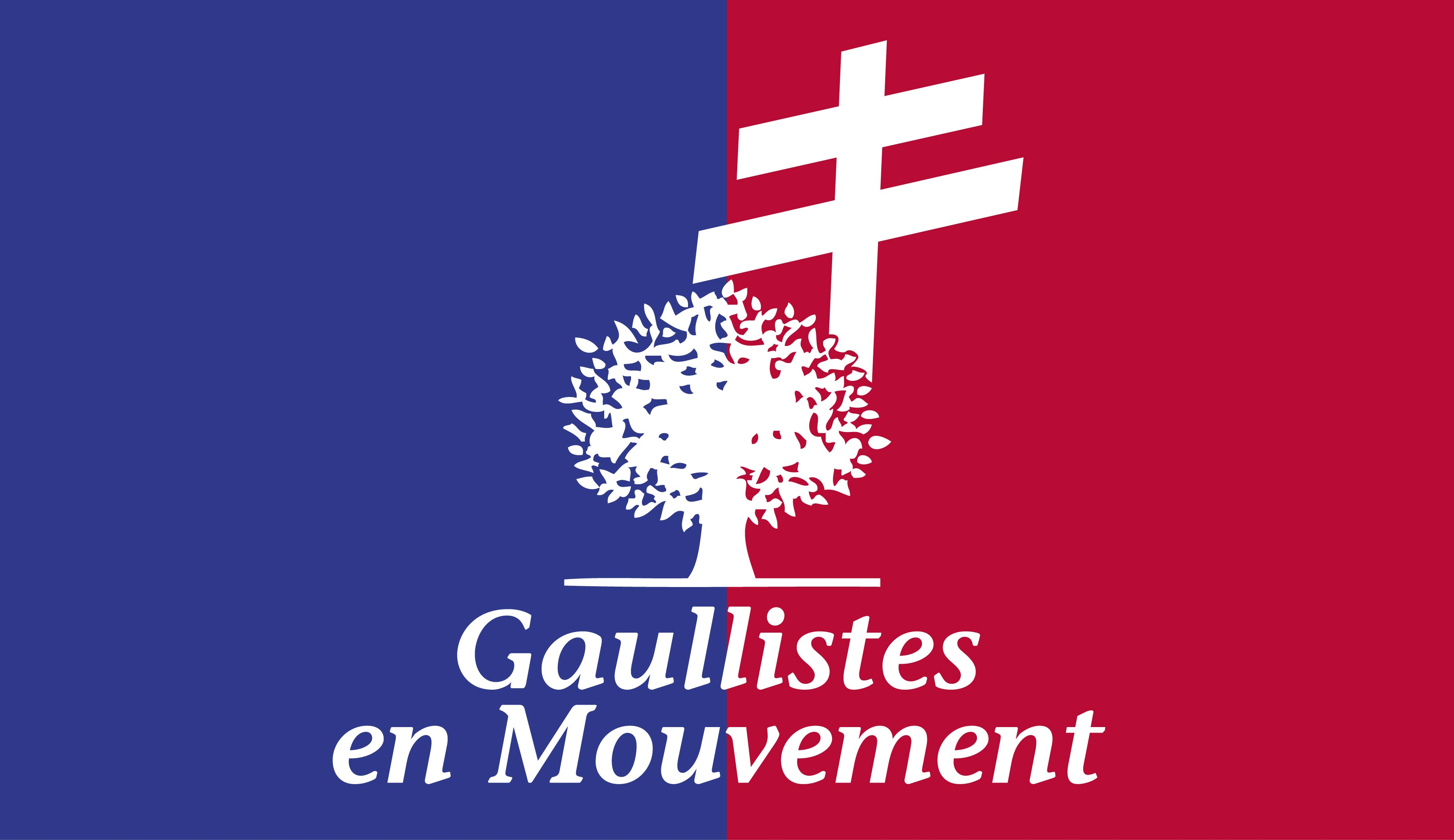
- Founder: Michèle Alliot-Marie, Roger Karoutchi, Henri Guaino, Patrick Ollier
- Founded: 2012
- Ideology: Gaullism
- National affiliation: Union for a Popular Movement
- Colours: Blue

Website
- gaullistesenmouvement.org

Gaullism, a way forward for France (French: Le Gaullisme, une voie d'avenir pour la France, pronounced [lə ɡolism yn vwa davniʁ puʁ la fʁɑ̃s]) was a recognised movement within the Union for a Popular Movement (UMP). It was created in 2012 to represent Gaullists within the party; it was led by Michèle Alliot-Marie, Roger Karoutchi, Henri Guaino and Patrick Ollier.

== Weight within the UMP ==
As a motion for the November 2012 congress, the Gaullists placed fourth with 12.31% of the motions vote, a poor result for a movement which aimed at representing one of the main historical families of the French right.

== Leadership and supporters ==
The movement's leaders were Michèle Alliot-Marie, Roger Karoutchi, Henri Guaino and Patrick Ollier. All are former members of the Rally for the Republic (RPR): Michèle Alliot-Marie was the party's last president between 1999 and 2002, and was seen as an ally of former President Jacques Chirac within the UMP after 2002. Henri Guaino, however, came from the social Gaullist faction of the RPR, and was a supporter of the late Philippe Séguin who endorsed a more Eurosceptic position critical of economic liberalism.

Parliamentarians which co-signed the motion included: Bernard Accoyer, Serge Dassault, Gérard Larcher, Didier Quentin and Catherine Vautrin. Parliaments could co-sign more than one motion.
