= Democratic and Popular =

Political faction in France

Democratic and Popular (Démocrate et populaire) is a Christian-democratic and centrist faction within the Union for a Popular Movement (UMP).

Its members include Philippe Douste-Blazy, Pierre Méhaignerie and Jacques Barrot, all three former members of Democratic Force (FD) and then of the Union for French Democracy (UDF).
