= Catherine Deroche =

French politician

Member of the French Senate for Maine-et-Loire
- Incumbent
- Assumed office 12 October 2010
- Preceded by: Christian Gaudin

Mayor of Bouchemaine
- In office 1999–2008
- Preceded by: Christian Mettelet
- Succeeded by: Anne-Sophie Hocquet de Lajartre

Personal details
- Born: 24 February 1953 (age 73) Beaupréau, France
- Party: The Republicans

Catherine Deroche (born 24 February 1953) is a French politician. She represents the department of Maine-et-Loire in the French Senate as a Union for a Popular Movement member.

Deroche was mayor of Bouchemaine from 1999 to 2008. She also served as chair of the Association départementale des maires. She is a member of the Regional council and secretary for the UMP in Maine-et-Loire.

Ahead of the 2022 presidential elections, Deroche publicly declared her support for Michel Barnier as the Republicans’ candidate.
