= The Social Right =

The Social Right La Droite sociale
- Leader: Laurent Wauquiez
- Founder: Laurent Wauquiez
- Founded: 2012
- National affiliation: Union for a Popular Movement
- Colours: Azure

Website
- www.droitesociale.fr

The Social Right (La Droite sociale) is a recognized movement within the Union for a Popular Movement (UMP). It was created as an informal club and think-tank by Laurent Wauquiez, mayor of Le Puy-en-Velay (Haute-Loire) and a former cabinet minister.

== History and ideology ==
The Social Right was created in 2011 by Laurent Wauquiez and other UMP parliamentarians who wanted to emphasize the right's social policy, appeal to the middle-class and break the left's purported domination of social policy. It placed large emphasis on fighting welfare dependency, denounced as a "cancer" by Wauquiez.

The Social Right proposed to condition a part of the Revenu de solidarité active to unpaid voluntary work and explored the possibility of reserving social housing to those currently employed.

== Weight within the UMP ==
As a motion for the November 2012 congress, the Social Right placed second with 21.69% of the motions vote.

== Leadership and supporters ==
The movement's leader is Laurent Wauquiez, a filloniste deputy for the Haute-Loire and mayor of Le Puy-en-Velay.

Parliamentarians which co-signed the motion included: Brigitte Barèges, Caroline Cayeux, Damien Abad, Gérard Cherpion and Yves Nicolin. Parliamentarians could co-sign more than one motion.
