= Michel Bécot =

French politician (born 1939)

Michel Bécot (French pronunciation: [miʃɛl beko]; born 10 October 1939) is a former member of the Senate of France who represented the Deux-Sèvres department from 1995 to 2014. He was a member of the Union for a Popular Movement centre-right political party.

== Bibliography ==
- Page on the Senate website (in French)
