= Catherine Troendlé =

French politician

Catherine Troendle (born 20 February 1961 in Mulhouse) is a member of the Senate of France, representing the Haut-Rhin department. She is a member of the Union for a Popular Movement. From 2001 until 2017, she was mayor of Ranspach-le-Bas, in Haut-Rhin. Alongside Minister-President Hannelore Kraft, she serves as co-chairwoman of the German-French Friendship Group set up by the German Bundesrat and the French Senate.
