= Dominique de Legge =

French politician

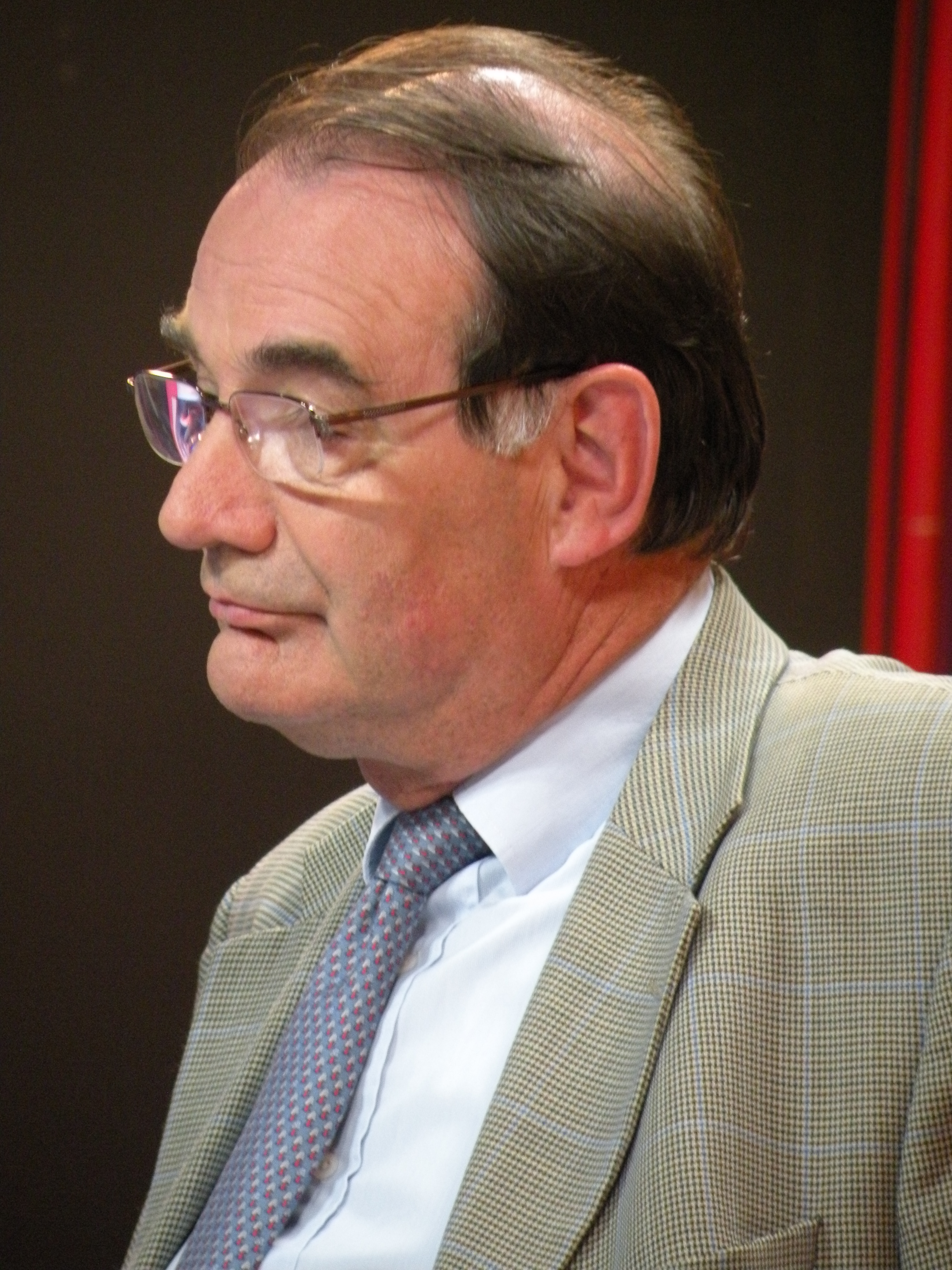
- Dominique de Legge in 2012

Member of the French Senate for Ille-et-Vilaine
- In office 1 October 2008 – 30 September 2026

Mayor of Le Pertre
- In office 1995–2017
- Preceded by: Théophile Paré
- Succeeded by: Joseph Maréchal

Personal details
- Born: 18 February 1952 (age 74) Le Pertre, Brittany, France
- Party: The Republicans

Dominique de Legge (born 18 February 1952) is a French politician and a member of the Senate of France. He represents the Ille-et-Vilaine department and is a member of the Union for a Popular Movement Party.

Ahead of the 2022 presidential elections, De Legge publicly declared his support for Michel Barnier as the Republicans’ candidate.
