= Yann Gaillard =

French politician (1936–2022)

Philippe Adnot

Senator, French Senate
- In office 16 July 1994 – 30 September 2014
- Succeeded by: François Baroin
- Constituency: Aube

Personal details
- Born: 9 October 1936 Paris, France
- Died: 6 November 2022 (aged 86)
- Party: UMP
- Occupation: Farmer

Yann Gaillard (9 October 1936 – 6 November 2022) was a French politician who was a member of the Senate of France.

Gaillard was appointed to the Senate following the death of Bernard Laurent, for whom Gaillard was the substitute at the time. Elected for the first time in the elections of 27 September 1998, he was re-elected in the election of 21 September 2008, where he was awarded the second seat in Aubes.

Gaillard was a member, and the Rapporteur, for the Finance commission.

For the Senate's election in 2014, he did not run, and it was François Baroin who succeeded him on 30 September 2014.

Gaillard died on 6 November 2022, at the age of 86.
