= Francis Grignon =

French politician (born 1944)

Francis Grignon (born 3 January 1944) is a French politician and a former member of the Senate of France. He represented the Bas-Rhin department from 1995 to 2004 and from 2005 to 2014. He is a member of the Union for a Popular Movement Party, a center-right political party in France. During his tenure, he worked on several legislative initiatives and was involved in economic and industrial matters, particularly focusing on energy policy and regional development.

== Early life and education ==
Francis Grignon was born in Strasbourg, located in the Alsace region of northeastern France. He pursued studies in engineering and economics, which laid the foundation for his later focus on energy and industrial policy.
