= Jean-Pierre Chauveau =

French politician (born 1942)

Jean-Pierre Chauveau (French pronunciation: [ʒɑ̃ pjɛʁ ʃovo]; born 8 November 1942) is a former member of the Senate of France. He represented the Sarthe department from 2004 to 2005 and from 2007 to 2014 as a member of the Union for a Popular Movement.
