= Louis Pinton =

French politician

Member of the French Senate for Indre
- In office 2007–2016

Personal details
- Born: 24 October 1948 Bonnat, France
- Died: 17 November 2016 (aged 68) Paris, France
- Party: The Republicans

Louis Pinton (24 October 1948 – 17 November 2016) was a member of the Senate of France, representing the Indre department. He was a member of the Union for a Popular Movement.
