= Christiane Demontès =

French politician (born 1954)

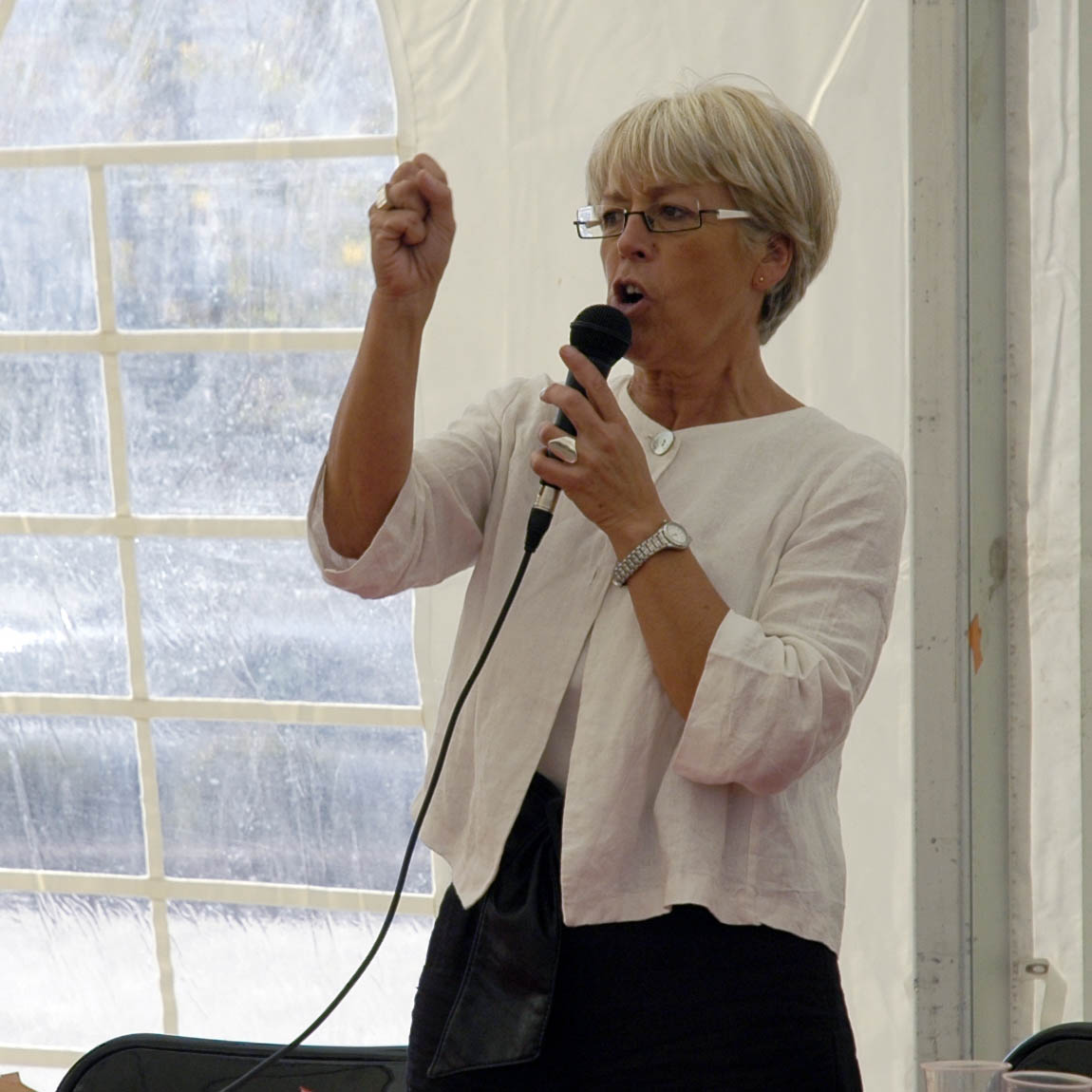
Christiane Demontès

Christiane Demontès (born 14 May 1954) is a former member of the Senate of France. She represented the Rhône department from 2004 to 2014 and is a member of the Socialist Party.

== Biography ==
Director of the Information and Guidance Center, Christiane Demontès was elected first secretary of the Rhône Socialist Party federation in 2003 after the Dijon congress. Re-elected two years later by party members after the Le Mans congress, where she was also appointed national secretary of the PS, responsible for North/South relations, she stepped down from these positions at the Reims congress in November 2008, while remaining a member of the national council.

Deputy mayor of Saint-Priest, Metropolis of Lyon from 1989 to 2004, she was elected regional councilor for Rhône-Alpes in 1992, re-elected in 1998 and 2004, a position she held until 2009. She was vice-president of the regional council, responsible for vocational training and apprenticeships from 2004 to 2008.

In March 2008, she won the municipal elections in Saint-Fons in the second round with 51.07% of the vote and became mayor of the town. In October 2008, the Lyon Administrative Court annulled these elections and sentenced the first federal secretary of the PS to one year of ineligibility for exceeding €4,000 in her campaign accounts. However, she was ultimately confirmed in her position and served her term as mayor until 2014.

On September 26, 2004, Christiane Demontès was elected senator for the Rhône (department) during the triennial renewal of the Senate and took office on October 1. On April 29, 2014, she was elected Vice President of the Senate, replacing Didier Guillaume, who had been elected President of the Socialist group in the Senate in the upper house a few days earlier. The following September, she did not stand for re-election to the Senate.

== Bibliography ==
- Page on the Senate website (in French)
