= Jackie Pierre =

French politician (born 1946)

Jackie Pierre (born 27 May 1946) is a former member of the Senate of France, representing the Vosges department from 2004 to 2020. He is a member of the Union for a Popular Movement.

== See also ==
- Politics of France
