= Élisabeth Lamure =

French politician (born 1947)

Élisabeth Lamure (born 20 November 1947) is a French politician and a former member of the Senate of France. She represented the Rhône department from 2004 to 2020 and is a member of the Union for a Popular Movement.
