= Marc Laménie =

French politician

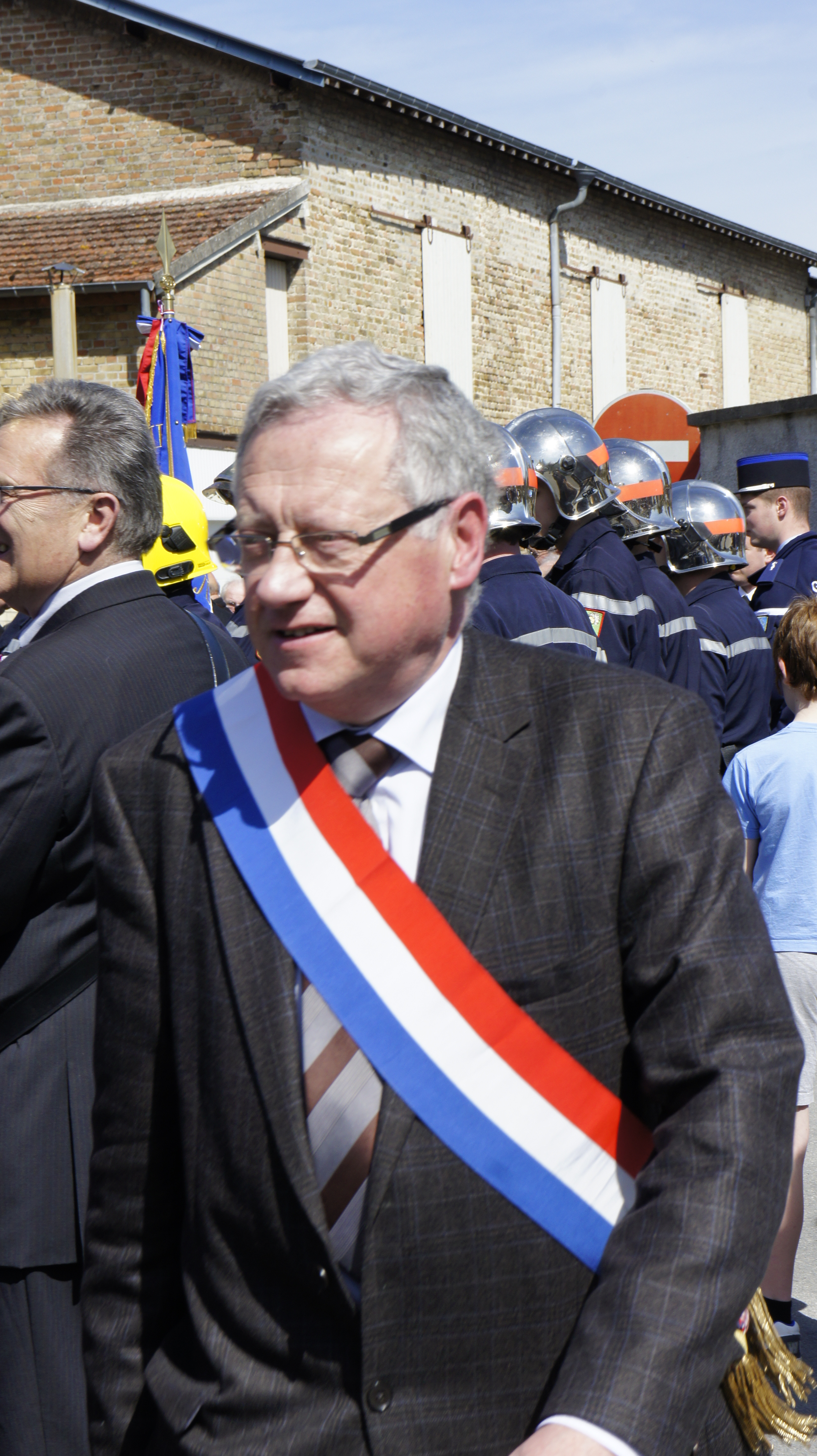

Member of the French Senate for Ardennes
- Incumbent
- Assumed office 26 August 2007
- Preceded by: Maurice Blin

Personal details
- Born: 11 July 1956 (age 69) Givet, France
- Party: The Republicans

Marc Laménie (born 11 July 1956) is a French politician and a member of the Senate of France. He represents the Ardennes department and is a member of the Union for a Popular Movement Party. He was elected on 26 August 2007, and was re-elected on 21 September 2008. He was mayor of Neuville-Day.
