= André Dulait =

French politician (1937–2020)

André Dulait (14 November 1937 – 18 January 2020) was a French politician and a member of the Senate of France. He represented the Deux-Sèvres department and was a member of the Union for a Popular Movement Party.
