= Robert Navarro (politician) =

French politician

Senator, French Senate
- In office 1 October 2008 – Incumbent
- Constituency: Hérault

Personal details
- Born: 1 May 1952 (age 73) Cuxac-d'Aude, Aude, France
- Party: Socialist

Robert Navarro (born 1 May 1952 in Cuxac-d'Aude, Aude) is a French politician and French Senator representing Hérault. He is a member of the Socialist Party (PS), which is part of the Party of European Socialists.

He was elected Senator on 21 September 2008, on the official PS list, which came third behind the Union for a Popular Movement (UMP) and 'renegade' PS lists in the Département of Hérault, which returns four Senators.

Until this point, he had been a member of the European Parliament, to which he was elected in 2004.

== Career ==
- Baccalaureate
- Executive, French National Railway Company (SNCF)
- Socialist Party federal secretary, Hérault (1978)
- Member of the Socialist Party national council (1978)
- Vice-Chairman of the Languedoc-Roussillon Council (1998)
- Chairman of the Socialist Party Group on the Languedoc-Roussillon Council (1998)
- Member of the European Parliament (2004–2008)
- Senator from Hérault (2008- )
