= Jean-Pierre Leleux =

French politician

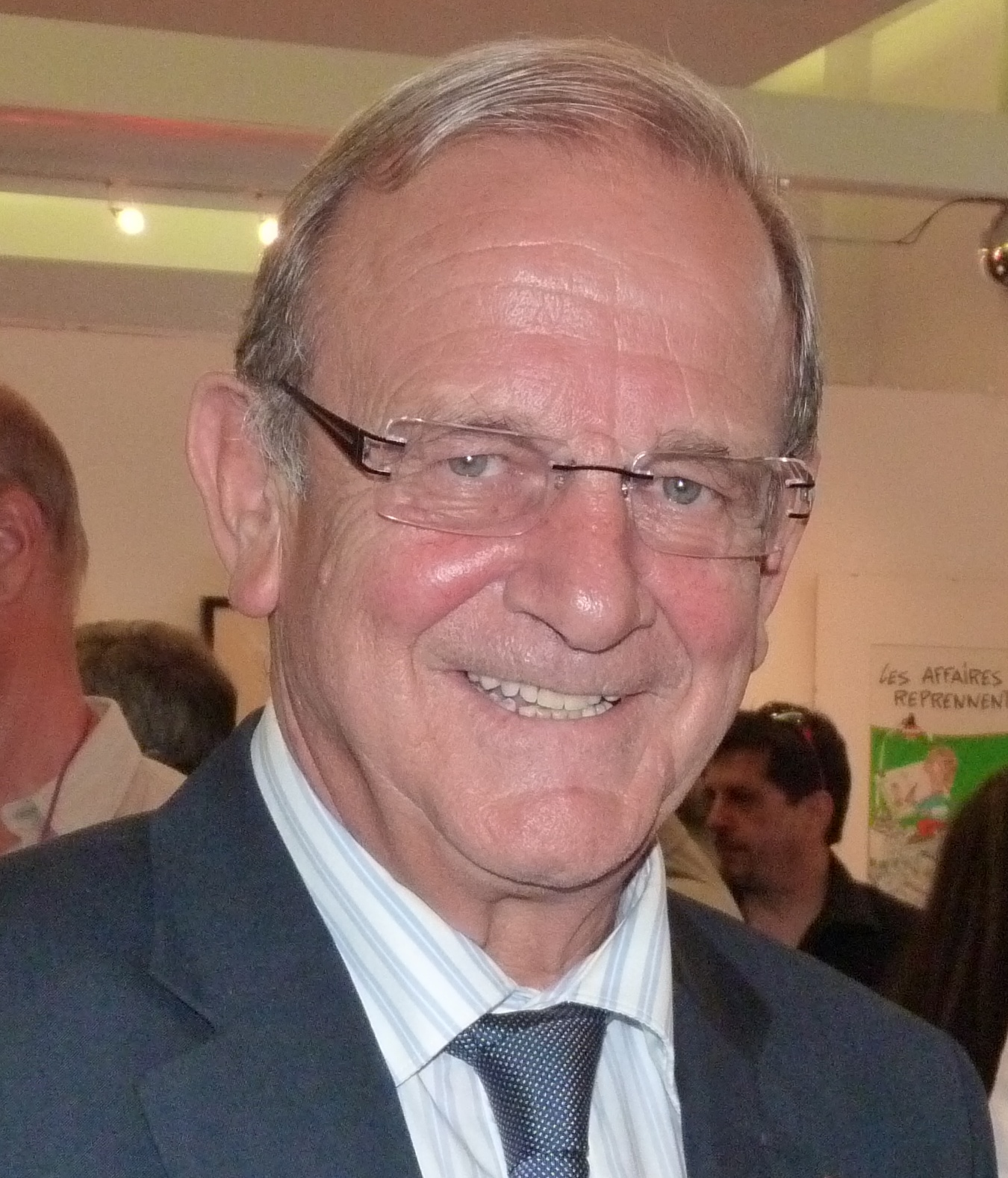
- Jean-Pierre Leleux in 2011

Senator, French Senate
- In office 21 September 2008 – Incumbent
- Constituency: Alpes-Maritimes

Mayor of Grasse
- In office 9 March 2008 – Incumbent
- Preceded by: Hervé de Fontmichel

President, Agglomeration Community Pôle Azur Provence
- In office 2001–Incumbent

Personal details
- Born: 8 May 1947 (age 78) Ghent, Belgium
- Party: UMP

Jean-Pierre Leleux (born 8 May 1947) is a French politician and a member of the Senate of France. He represents the Alpes-Maritimes department and is a member of the Union for a Popular Movement Party.
