= Gérard César =

French politician (1934–2024)

Gérard César (19 December 1934 – 8 May 2024) was a member of the Senate of France. He represented the Gironde department, and was a member of the Union for a Popular Movement. César died on 8 May 2024, at the age of 89.

== Biography ==
A Winemaker by profession, he became deputy for the 9th district of Gironde on September 28, 1976, replacing Robert Boulin, who had been appointed minister, and for whom he was the alternate. He was re-elected as alternate in 1978 and regained his seat as deputy, with Boulin remaining a member of the government. Defeated in 1981 by Gilbert Mitterrand, he was re-elected in the list vote in 1986, then defeated again by Gilbert Mitterrand in 1988.

On June 15, 1990, he became senator for Gironde following the death of Jean-François Pintat, for whom he was the alternate. He was re-elected on September 27, 1998, under the RPR banner.

During the 2008 senatorial elections, and following his defeat in the 2007 legislative elections, Alain Juppé demanded that Hugues Martin be included on the Union for a Popular Movement list at the expense of Gérard César. César then decided to head an independent list to “defend the rural world,” despite “pressure” from Juppé. Ultimately, on September 21, 2008, César's list won 18.68% of the vote, securing his reelection.

He supports Alain Juppé in the 2016 Republican presidential primary.

On October 1, 2017, he was one of the last thirteen senators (out of a total of 41) to resign in order to focus on their local mandates, in accordance with the law of February 14, 2014 on the non-Dual mandate. Florence Lassarade, who was next on the list in 2014, replaced him.

In March 2022, he was involved in a serious tractor accident in Lugasson and resigned from his positions a few months later.

Gérard César died on May 8, 2024, in Rauzan at the age of 89.
