= Philippe Paul =

French politician

Member of the French Senate for Finistère
- Incumbent
- Assumed office 1 October 2008

Mayor of Douarnenez
- In office 15 March 2008 – 12 October 2017
- Preceded by: Monique Prévost
- Succeeded by: François Cadic

Personal details
- Born: 25 January 1965 (age 61) Douarnenez, France
- Party: The Republicans
- Education: University of Rennes

Philippe Paul (born 25 January 1965) is a member of the Senate of France, representing the Finistère department. He is a member of the Union for a Popular Movement.
