= Alain Milon =

French politician

Member of the French Senate for Vaucluse
- Incumbent
- Assumed office 26 September 2004

Personal details
- Born: 16 September 1947 (age 77); France
- Political party: RPR; RPF; UMP; The Republicans
- Profession: Physician

Alain Milon (born 16 September 1947) is a member of the Senate of France, representing the Vaucluse department. He is a member of The Republicans party.
