= Daniel Laurent =

French politician

- Born: February 4, 1949 (age 77); France
- Occupation: French Senator
- Known for: Being a French politician

Daniel Laurent (born 4 February 1949) is a French politician and a member of the Senate of France. He represents the Charente-Maritime department and is a member of the Union for a Popular Movement Party.

== Biography ==
A winegrower, he was elected senator for Charente-Maritime on September 21, 2008. He was elected mayor of the town of Pons, Charente-Maritime in 1995. Then, on September 29, 2017, he resigned from this position due to the law on multiple mandates to remain a senator.

Il soutient Alain Juppé pour la primaire présidentielle des Républicains de 2016.

== Bibliography ==
- Page on the Senate website
