= Marie-Annick Duchêne =

French politician

Member of the French Senate for Yvelines
- In office 1 October 2011 – 1 October 2017

Deputy Mayor of Versailles
- In office 21 March 2008 – 4 April 2014
- Mayor: François de Mazières
- Succeeded by: Alain Nourissier

Personal details
- Born: 23 August 1940 (age 85) Pau, France
- Party: UMP
- Profession: Teacher

Marie-Annick Duchêne (born 23 August 1940) is a French politician. She represented the département of Yvelines in the French Senate from 2011 to 2017. She is a member of the Union for a Popular Movement.

She was born Marie-Annick Bélan. A teacher of classic literature by profession, she was elected to the Senate on 25 September 2011. She retired at the 2017 Senate Elections.

Duchêne was named a Chevalier in the French Legion of Honour.
