= Pierre Hérisson =

French politician (1945–2025)

Pierre Hérisson (12 June 1945 – 21 November 2025) was a French politician who was a member of the Senate of France. He represented the Haute-Savoie department and was a member of the Union for a Popular Movement Party. Hérisson was born in Annecy, Haute-Savoie on 12 June 1945, and died on 21 November 2025, at the age of 80.
