= Claude Belot =

French politician (born 1936)

Claude Belot (born 11 July 1936) is a former member of the Senate of France, representing the Charente-Maritime department from 1989 to 2014. He is a member of the Union for a Popular Movement.
