= Bernard Fournier =

French politician

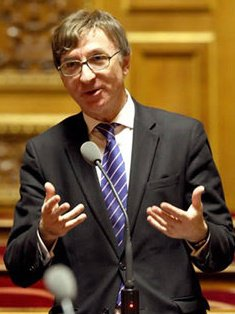
- Bernard Fournier in 2005

Member of the French Senate for Loire
- Incumbent
- Assumed office 19 November 1997

Personal details
- Born: 13 September 1946 (age 79) Saint-Étienne, France
- Party: UMP; The Republicans

Bernard Fournier (born 13 September 1946) is a French politician and a member of the Senate of France. He represents the Loire department and is a member of The Republicans Party.

== Political career ==
In the Senate, Fournier is a member of the Committee on Foreign Affairs, Defense and the Armed Forces. He also chairs the French-Romanian Parliamentary Friendship Group.

In addition to his work in Parliament, Fournier has been serving as a member of the French delegation to the Parliamentary Assembly of the Council of Europe since 2008. In this capacity, he is a member of the Committee on Migration, Refugees and Displaced Persons; the Sub-Committee on Co-operation with non European countries of origin and transit; and the Sub-Committee on Refugee and Migrant Children and Young People.

== Political positions ==
Ahead of the 2022 presidential elections, Fournier publicly declared his support for Michel Barnier as the Republicans’ candidate.

== Bibliography ==
- Page on the Senate website
