= Pierre Bordier =

French politician (born 1945)

Pierre Bordier (born 21 June 1945) is a former member of the Senate of France who represented the Yonne department from 2004 to 2014. He is a member of the Union for a Popular Movement.

== Bibliography ==
- Page on the Senate website (in French)
