= Marcel-Pierre Cléach =

French politician (1934–2019)

Marcel-Pierre Cléach (16 January 1934 – 18 March 2019) was a French politician, as a member of the Senate of France. He represented the Sarthe department, and was a member of the Union for a Popular Movement.
