= Joël Bourdin =

French politician and economist (1938–2025)

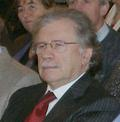
Joël Bourdin

Joël Bourdin (25 January 1938 – 19 September 2025) was a French politician who was a member of the Senate, representing the Eure department. He was a member of the Union for a Popular Movement.

== Political career ==
=== Debut in Bernay ===
A university professor by profession, Joël Bourdin was first elected mayor of Bernay in the 1983 French municipal elections. Two years later, he was elected general councilor of Eure in the canton of Bernay-Ouest. And then became vice-president of the General Council of Eure.

In 2003, he chose to resign from Bernay town hall to devote himself to his other mandates. He was succeeded by his financial assistant Hervé Maurey. He did the same later during the French cantonal elections of 2004, during which he left his place of general councilor of Bernay-Ouest to Hervé Maurey.

=== In the Senate ===
Bourdin was elected senator of Eure on 24 September 1989 and re-elected in 1998.

He was triumphantly renewed for a third term as senator in 2008, achieving the best score in his department (58.48% of the vote). However, during the senatorial elections of September 2014, he was at the top of a dissenting list against the UMP-UDI union list but was defeated. The irony of fate wanted this list to be led by his dolphin in favor of whom he resigned from the town hall of Bernay and the Departmental Council of Eure, Hervé Maurey.

== Death ==
Bourdin died on 19 September 2025, at the age of 87.

== His mandates ==
- Senator (1989–2014)
- Vice-Chairman of the Eure General Council (2004)
- Mayor of Bernay (1983–2003)
- Bernay municipal councilor (2003–2008)
- Member of the Retreat Orientation Council.
- Regional Councilor of Upper Normandy
- President of the Community of Communes of Bernay and its surroundings

== Sources ==
- Page on the Senate website
