= Rassemblement-UMP group =

French parliamentary group

The Rassemblement-UMP group split from the Union for a Popular Movement group on 27 November 2012. They held 73 Members of Parliament. It dissolved in 2013.

== History ==
François Fillon contested the 2012 Union for a Popular Movement leadership election formed a splinter faction in the National Assembly.

== Organisation ==
- Chairman: François Fillon
- Secretary General: Stéphane Juvigny
- Deputy Secretary General: Agnès Evren
- Spokesperson: Jérôme Chartier
