= Jacques Legendre (French politician) =

French politician

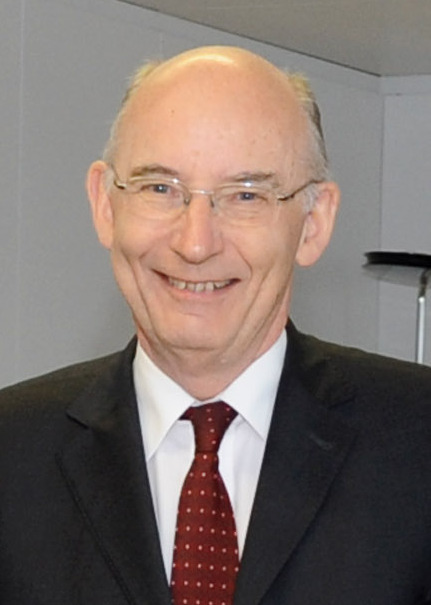
Jacques Legendre in 2010

Jacques Legendre (born 2 December 1941 in Paris) is a French politician and a member of the Senate of France. He represents the Nord department and is a member of the Union for a Popular Movement. He was Secretary of State for Labour and Professional Training from 1977 to 1981.
