= Guy Fischer =

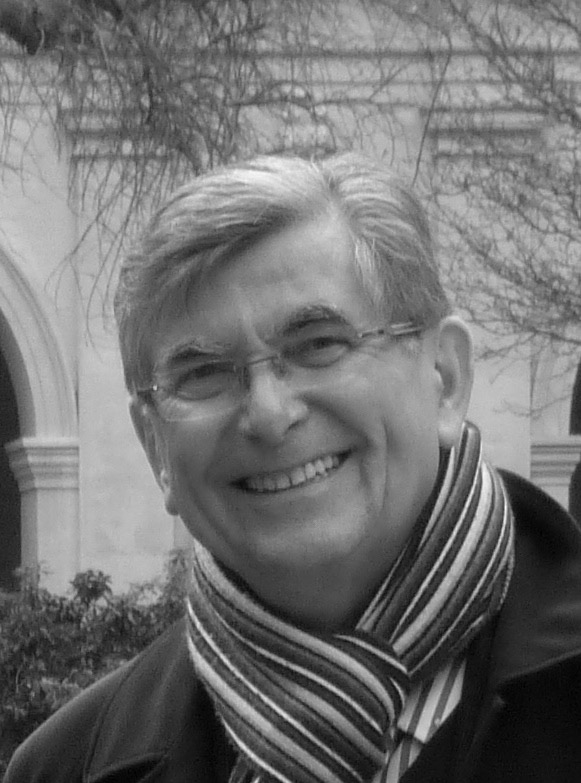
Photo de Guy FISCHER

Guy Fischer (born 12 January 1944 in Décines-Charpieu – died 1 November 2014,) was a member of the Senate of France, representing the Rhône department. He was a member of the French Communist Party and of the Communist, Republican, and Citizen Group.
