= Anne Emery-Dumas =

French politician

Anne Emery-Dumas (born 30 August 1959) is a French politician who represented the Nièvre department in the Senate from 2012 to 2017.

== Career ==
She was a member of the Socialist Party (PS) from 1976 until 2017, when she joined La République En Marche! (LREM) shortly before she lost reelection.

Prior to being elected to the Senate, Emery-Dumas was chief of staff to the President of the Departmental Council of Nièvre. She was elected as a Socialist in a December 2012 by-election held after Didier Boulaud resigned his Senate seat. She had originally been chosen as the Socialist candidate for the 2011 general election for the Senate but was declared ineligible because she was employed as a senior public servant by the departmental council at the time.

In December 2016, she supported former Economy Minister Emmanuel Macron's candidacy for the upcoming presidential election and his En Marche! movement, which she joined. A candidate for reelection in the 2017 election, she came out on top in the first round, but came third place in the second round of voting.
