= Robert Tropéano =

Senator, French Senate
- In office 9 July 2006 – Incumbent
- Constituency: Hérault

Personal details
- Born: 20 April 1939 (age 87)
- Party: European Democratic and Social Rally

Robert Tropeano (born 20 April 1939) is a former member of the Senate of France, who represented the Hérault department. He is a member of the European Democratic and Social Rally group in the Senate.

He entered the Senate in July 2006, following the death of Marcel Vidal, and sat as a Socialist Senator for the remainder of that term. For the elections of 2008, he ran at the head of a 'renegade' Socialist Party list, which came second, behind the Union for a Popular Movement (UMP), but beating the official Socialist list. On 24 September 2008, he was expelled from the Socialist party for this act, and so sits with the miscellaneous groups making up EDSR.
