= Michel Houel =

French politician

Member of the French Senate for Seine-et-Marne
- In office 1 October 2004 – 30 November 2016
- Succeeded by: Pierre Cuypers

Personal details
- Born: 8 November 1942 Condé-Sainte-Libiaire, France
- Died: 30 November 2016 (aged 74) Caen, France
- Cause of death: Heart attack
- Party: UMP

Michel Houel (8 November 1942 – 30 November 2016) was a French politician. He was the mayor of Crécy-la-Chapelle from 2001 until 2015, and represented the Seine-et-Marne department in the Senate of France from 2004 until his death in 2016. He was a member of the Union for a Popular Movement Party.
