= Jean-Patrick Courtois =

French politician

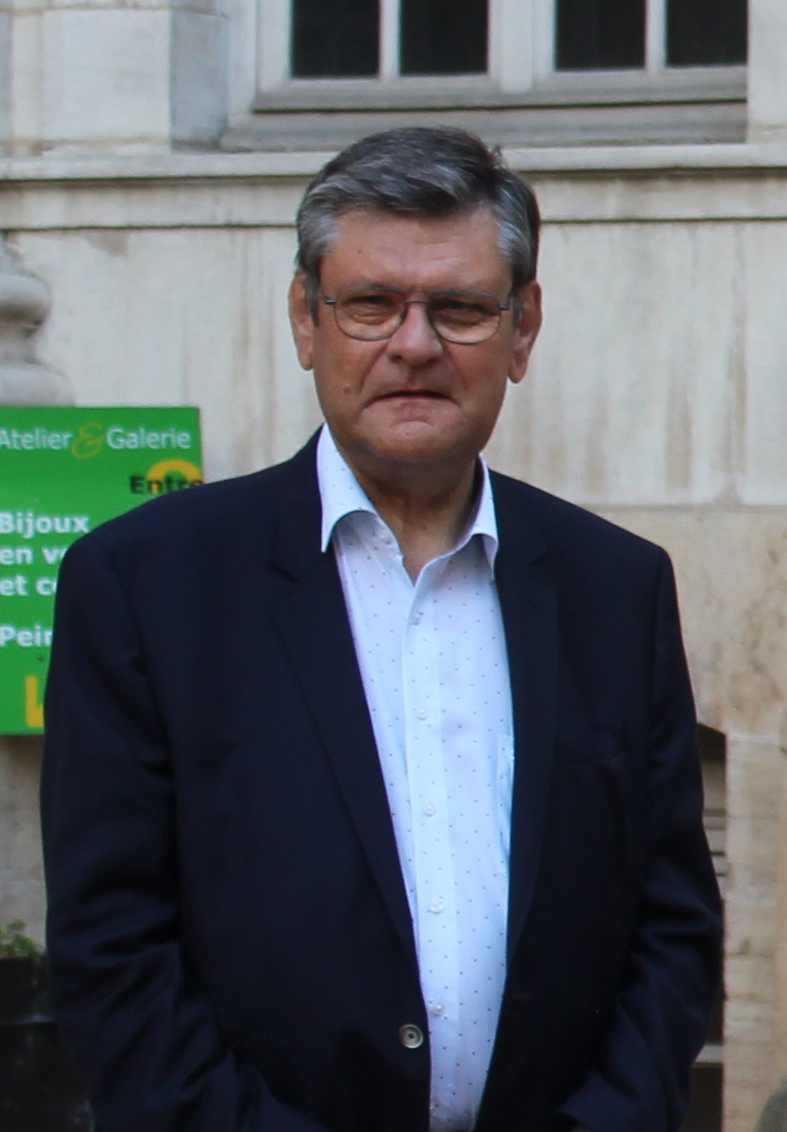
Jean Patrick Courtois

Jean-Patrick Courtois (French pronunciation: [ʒɑ̃ patʁik kuʁtwa]; born 20 May 1951 in Lyon) is a member of the Senate of France. He represents the Saône-et-Loire department, and is a member of the Union for a Popular Movement. He is the mayor of the city of Mâcon, in the Saône-et-Loire department since 2001.
