= Christiane Hummel =

French politician (born 1942)

Christiane Hummel (born 8 May 1942) is a French politician and a former member of the Senate of France. She represented the Var department from 2004 to 2017 and is a member of the Union for a Popular Movement Party.
