= Louis Nègre =

French politician (born 1947)

Senator, French Senate
- In office 21 September 2008 – Incumbent
- Constituency: Alpes-Maritimes

Mayor, Cagnes-sur-Mer
- In office 1995–Incumbent
- Preceded by: Suzanne Sauvaigo

First vice president, Agglomeration community of Nice Côte d'Azur
- In office 2008–Incumbent

Personal details
- Born: February 8, 1947 (age 79) Nice, France
- Party: UMP

Louis Nègre (born 8 February 1947) is a member of the Senate of France, one of five senators representing the Alpes-Maritimes department.

He is a member of the Union for a Popular Movement and has been the mayor of Cagnes-sur-Mer since 1995.
