= Marie-Thérèse Bruguière =

French politician (born 1942)

Member of the French Senate for Hérault
- Incumbent
- Assumed office 1 October 2017
- Preceded by: François Commeinhes
- In office 1 October 2008 – 30 September 2014
- Succeeded by: Jean-Pierre Grand

Personal details
- Born: 26 October 1942 (age 83) Mauguio, France
- Party: The Republicans

Marie-Thérèse Bruguière (born 26 October 1942) is a French politician, and retired hospital administrator.

== Career ==
She was elected to represent the department of Hérault in the Senate of France (le Sénat) on 21 September 2008. She is a member of the Union for a Popular Movement (UMP), which is a part of the European People's Party (PPE).

In the 2012 legislative elections, Françoise Briand obtained 46.10% of the votes in the seventh constituency of Essonne, according to the results published on the Ministry of the Interior's website. This outcome was considered very negative for her campaign, as the constituency had traditionally been a stronghold for right-wing parties since its establishment.

In the 2014 municipal elections, Françoise Briand ran as a candidate supported by the Union for a Popular Movement (UMP). However, she received only 20.26% of the votes in the first round, placing her behind incumbent mayor Simone Mathieu from the Left Party, who obtained 24.47% of the votes. She was also significantly behind Jean-Marie Vilain from the Ainsi va la ville association, who garnered 40.20% of the votes. As a result, she was compelled to withdraw from the election. Ultimately, the "Ainsi Va La Ville" list emerged victorious with 65% of the votes in the second round.

== Current positions ==
- Mayor of Saint-Aunès since 1989
- Regional Councillor since 2004
- Senator from l'Hérault since 2008
- Vice president of the Communauté de communes du Pays de l'Or
- President of the SIVOM de l'étang de l'Or
