= Charles Guené =

French politician

Member of the French Senate for Haute-Marne
- Incumbent
- Assumed office 1 October 2001

Personal details
- Born: 6 April 1952 (age 74) Puteaux, France
- Party: The Republicans

Charles Guené (born 6 April 1952) is a French politician and a member of the Senate of France. He represents the Haute-Marne department and is a member of The Republicans Party.
