= Colette Mélot =

French politician

Member of the French Senate for Seine-et-Marne
- Incumbent
- Assumed office 1 October 2004

Personal details
- Born: 20 April 1947 (age 79) Sète, France
- Party: Agir
- Education: Paul Valéry University
- Profession: Teacher

Colette Mélot (French: [kɔlɛt melo]; born 20 April 1947) is a member of the Senate of France, representing the Seine-et-Marne department. She is a member of Agir.
