= Christian Gaudin (politician) =

French politician (born 1950)

Christian Gaudin (born 13 January 1950) is a former member of the Senate of France, who represented the Maine-et-Loire department from 2001 to 2010. He is a member of the Centrist Union.

== Bibliography ==
- Page on the Senate website (in French)
