= Gérard Bailly =

French politician (born 1940)

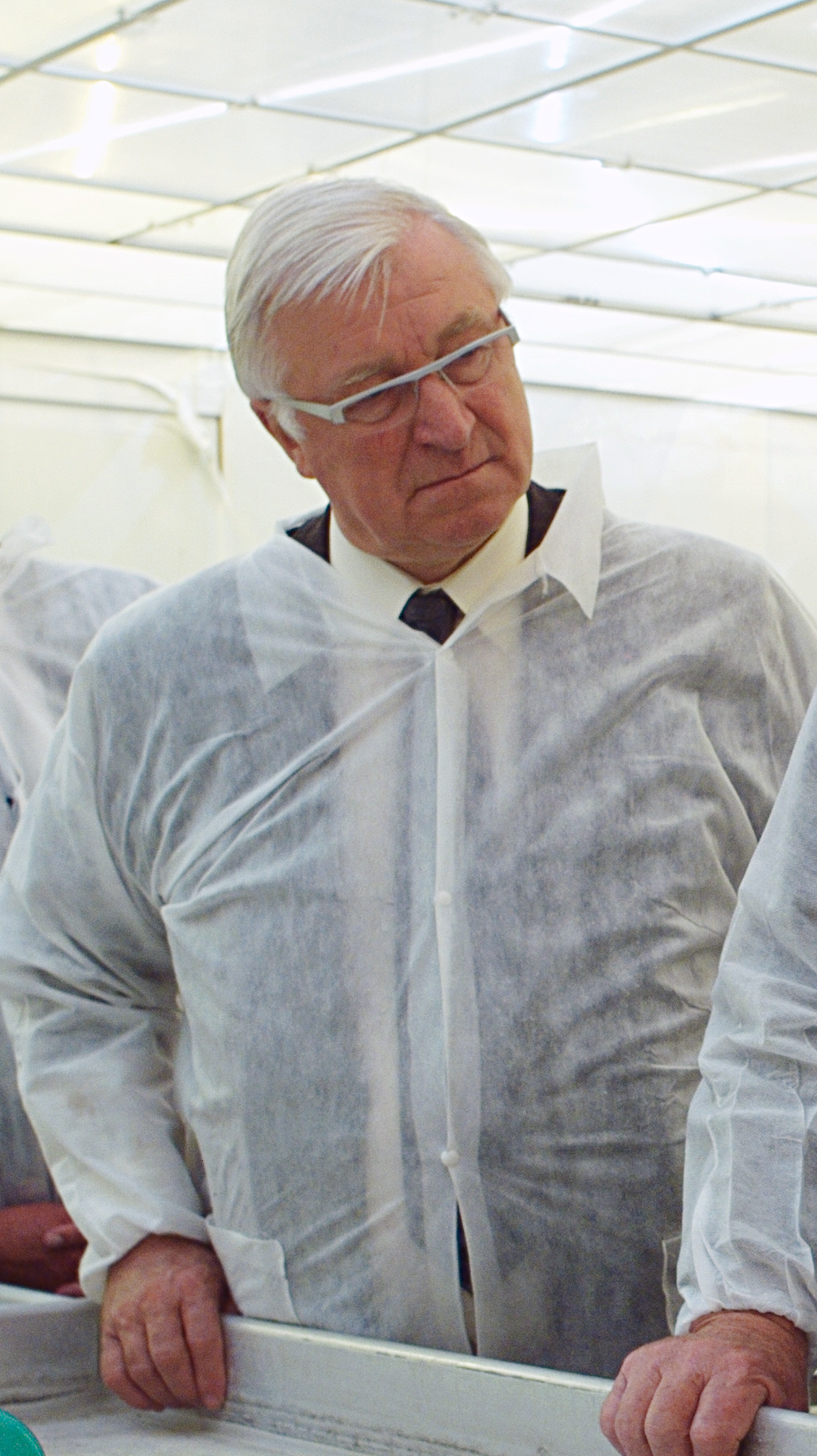
Gérard Baily visiting INRA Versailles

Gérard Bailly (born 28 January 1940) is a former member of the Senate of France, representing the Jura department from 2001 to 2017.
