= Michel Fontaine (politician) =

French politician (1952–2025)

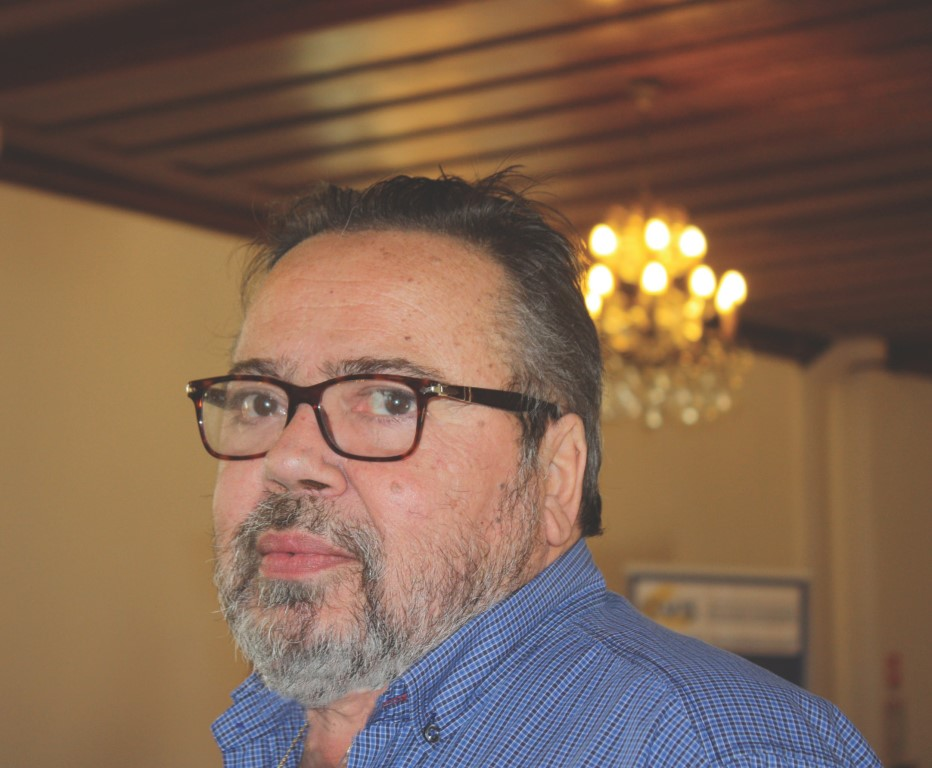
- Michel Fontaine

Mayor of Saint-Pierre, Réunion
- In office 19 March 2001 – 27 March 2025
- Preceded by: Élie Hoarau

Member of the French Senate for Réunion
- In office 2011–2017

Personal details
- Born: 6 May 1952 Romans-sur-Isère, France
- Died: 27 March 2025 (aged 72) Madagascar
- Party: The Republicans
- Education: University of Marseille
- Profession: Radiologist

Michel Fontaine (6 May 1952 – 27 March 2025) was a French radiologist and politician who was a member of the Senate. He was elected in 2011 as one of three senators for the overseas department of Réunion. He was not re-elected in 2017. He was a member of Les Républicains. He was also the mayor of Saint-Pierre, Réunion from 2001 until his death on 27 March 2025, at the age of 72.
