= Michel Billout =

French politician (born 1958)

Michel Billout (born 19 February 1958) is a former member of the Senate of France, representing the Seine-et-Marne department from 2004 to 2017. He is a member of the Communist, Republican, and Citizen Group.

== Biography ==
Born into a working-class family, Michel Billout worked as a schoolteacher. He joined the French Communist Party at the age of 14.

A city councilor in Nangis since 1995, then deputy mayor, he succeeded the communist mayor, Claude Pasquier, in September 2002. He lost his seat in the 2008 municipal elections to Philippe Delannoy (independent). He was re-elected in the 2012 by-elections, then again in 2014. He was defeated in the 2020 municipal elections by Nolwenn Le Bouter (The Republicans (France)).

On September 26, 2004, Michel Billout was elected senator for Seine-et-Marne. A member of the Communist, Republican, and Citizen (CRC) group, he was appointed vice-chair of the European Affairs Committee. His term was renewed in the 2011 elections.

He is not seeking re-election to the Senate in 2017.

In September 2023, Mediapart revealed that Michel Billout was involved in a controversy related to the employment of Gérald Briant, who was employed as his parliamentary assistant from 2005 to 2011, but who, according to Mediapart's information, was allegedly working for the French Communist Party instead.
