= Isabelle Debré =

French politician

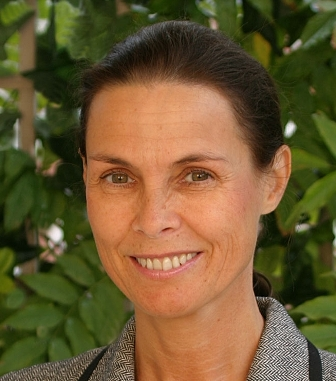

Member of the French Senate for Hauts-de-Seine
- In office 1 October 2004 – 2017

Personal details
- Born: 23 May 1957 (age 68) Lisieux, France
- Party: The Republicans
- Spouse: Vincent Debré

Isabelle Debré (born 23 May 1957 in Lisieux, Calvados) was a member of the Senate of France from 2004 to 2017. A member of The Republicans Party, she represented the Hauts-de-Seine department, in Île-de-France region.

== Bibliography ==
- Page on the Senate website
