= Roger Karoutchi =

French politician (born 1951)

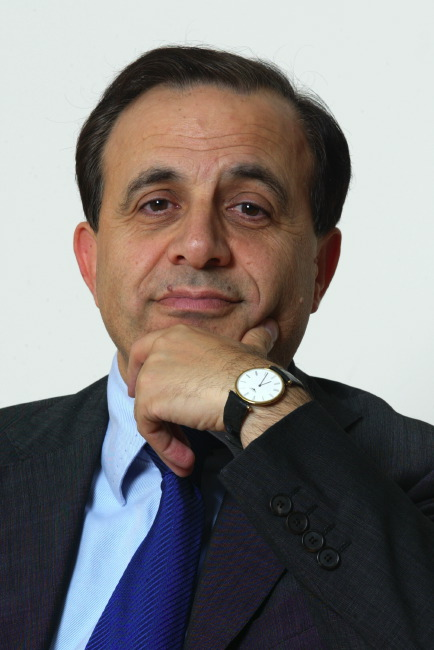

First Vice-president of the Senate
- Incumbent
- Assumed office 6 October 2020
- President: Gérard Larcher
- Preceded by: Philippe Dallier

Member of the French Senate for Hauts-de-Seine
- Incumbent
- Assumed office 1 October 2011

Secretary of state for the Relations with the Parliament
- In office 18 May 2007 – 23 June 2009
- President: Nicolas Sarkozy
- Prime Minister: François Fillon
- Preceded by: Henri Cuq
- Succeeded by: Henri de Raincourt

Member of the Regional Council of Île-de-France
- In office 1992–2015
- President: Michel Giraud; Jean-Paul Huchon

Personal details
- Born: 26 August 1951 (age 75) Casablanca, Morocco
- Party: UMP; The Republicans
- Education: Sciences Po Aix

Roger Karoutchi (French pronunciation: [ʁɔʒe kaʁutʃi]; born 26 August 1951) is a French teacher and politician who has been serving as the first Vice President of the French Senate since 2020. He previously served as the French Ambassador to the OECD and as Secretary of State to the French Prime Minister, with responsibility for Relations with Parliament.

== Early life ==
Karoutchi was born in Casablanca into a Moroccan Jewish family. His ancestors were Livornese Jews (Grana) from Italy who had settled in Morocco in the 18th century.

He received a master's degree from the Sciences Po Aix.

== Career ==
Karoutchi became a history teacher, first in Goussainville, and then in Paris, teaching from 1975 to 1985. He continued his political activity, which he had started at the age of 16, during that period, being a national delegate of the Rassemblement pour la République (RPR) from 1981 to 1986.

At that time, Karoutchi joined the office of Philippe Séguin, the Minister of Social Affairs and Employment, eventually becoming Séguin's chief of staff when he became president of the National Assembly.

Karoutchi was a Member of the European Parliament from 1997 to 1999 and Senator from Hauts-de-Seine from 1999 to 2007.

Karoutchi was very active in the 2007 presidential campaign of Nicolas Sarkozy, with whom he has a close personal relationship.

From 2009 to 2011, Karoutchi served as the French Ambassador to the OECD.

As part of a reorganization of the Union for a Popular Movement (later Republicans) leadership under their chairman Jean-François Copé in January 2013, Karoutchi became – alongside Henri de Raincourt, Jean-Claude Gaudin, Brice Hortefeux, Christian Estrosi and Gérard Longuet – one of the party's six vice-presidents.

== Political career ==
Karoutchi has held various governmental and electoral positions throughout his career. He served as the Secretary of State for Relations with Parliament from 2007 to 2009. Prior to this, he was a member of the European Parliament from 1997 to 1999, and then became a senator of Hauts-de-Seine until 2007 when he joined the government.

Karoutchi has also served as a Vice-president of the Regional Council of Ile-de-France from 1994 to 1998, and as a Regional councillor of Ile-de-France since 1992, being reelected in 1998 and 2004. He has also held various municipal council positions, including deputy-mayor of Villeneuve-la-Garenne since 2008, municipal councillor of Villeneuve-la-Garenne since 2008, municipal councillor of Nanterre from 1989 to 1995, and municipal councillor of Boulogne-Billancourt from 1995 to 2001.

== Political positions ==
In the 2012 leadership election of the Union for a Popular Movement (UMP), Karoutchi endorsed Jean-François Copé.

In the Republicans' 2016 presidential primaries, Karoutchi endorsed Sarkozy as the party's candidate for the office of President of France. Ahead of the 2022 presidential elections, he publicly declared his support for Valérie Pécresse as the Republicans’ candidate.

Following the 2023 Nigerien coup d'état, Karoutchi joined forces with fellow Senators Christian Cambon and Bruno Retailleau on an open letter to President Macron in Le Figaro, criticizing France's Africa policy and arguing that the failure of Operation Barkhane was in great part the reason why France and its economic, political and military presence have been rejected in Mali, Burkina Faso, Niger and the Central African Republic; the letter was signed by 91 other Senators.

== Personal life ==
In January 2009, Karoutchi publicly announced that he is gay, becoming the first French minister to come out while in office.

== Biography ==
- Official website
