= François Commeinhes =

French politician (born 1949)

François Commeinhes (born November 10, 1949) is a French politician. He served as a member of the Senate of France from 2014 to 2017 as a member of The Republicans.
