= Union for a Popular Movement =

French political party (2002–2015)

Union for a Popular Movement Union pour un mouvement populaire
- Abbreviation: UMP
- President: Nicolas Sarkozy
- Vice President: Nathalie Kosciusko-Morizet
- General Secretary: Laurent Wauquiez
- Founder: Jacques Chirac
- Founded: 23 April 2002; 24 years ago
- Dissolved: 30 May 2015; 11 years ago
- Merger of: Rally for the Republic; Liberal Democracy
- Succeeded by: The Republicans
- Headquarters: 238, rue de Vaugirard 75015 Paris Cedex 15
- Membership (2014): 143,000
- Ideology: Conservatism; Neo-Gaullism; Liberal conservatism Christian democracy
- Political position: Centre-right to right-wing
- European affiliation: European People's Party
- European Parliament group: European People's Party Group
- International affiliation: Centrist Democrat International; International Democrat Union
- Colours: Blue; White; Red

Website
- "UMP | Union pour un Mouvement Populaire". Archived from the original on 21 May 2015.

The Union for a Popular Movement (French: Union pour un mouvement populaire [ynjɔ̃ puʁ œ̃ muvmɑ̃ pɔpylɛːʁ]; UMP [y.ɛmpe]) was a liberal-conservative political party in France, largely inspired by the Gaullist tradition. During its existence, the UMP was one of the two major parties in French politics along with the Socialist Party (PS). In May 2015, the party was succeeded by The Republicans.

Nicolas Sarkozy, the then president of the UMP, was elected president of France in the 2007 French presidential election, until he was later defeated by PS candidate François Hollande in the 2012 presidential election. After the November 2012 party congress, the UMP experienced internal fractioning and was plagued by monetary scandals which forced its president Jean-François Copé to resign. After Sarkozy's re-election as UMP president in November 2014, he put forward an amendment to change the name of the party to The Republicans, which was approved and came into effect on 30 May 2015. The UMP enjoyed an absolute majority in the National Assembly from 2002 to 2012, and was a member of the European People's Party (EPP), the Centrist Democrat International (CDI) and the International Democrat Union (IDU).

== History ==
=== Background ===
Since the 1980s, the political groups of the parliamentary right have joined forces around the values of economic liberalism and the building of Europe (European integration). Their rivalries had contributed to their defeat in the 1981 and 1988 legislative elections.

Before the 1993 legislative election, the Gaullist Rally for the Republic (RPR) and the centrist Union for French Democracy (UDF) formed an electoral alliance, the Union for France (UPF). However, in the 1995 presidential campaign, they were both divided between followers of Jacques Chirac, who was eventually elected, and supporters of Prime Minister Edouard Balladur. After their defeat in the 1997 legislative election, the RPR and UDF created the Alliance for France in order to coordinate the actions of their parliamentary groups.

=== Foundation and early years ===
Before the 2002 presidential campaign, the supporters of President Jacques Chirac, divided in three centre-right parliamentary parties, founded an association named Union on the Move (Union en mouvement). After Chirac's re-election, in order to contest the legislative election jointly, the Union for the Presidential Majority (Union pour la majorité présidentielle) was created. It was renamed "Union for a Popular Movement" and as such established as a permanent organisation.

Various parties, such as the Gaullist-conservative Rally for the Republic (RPR), the conservative-liberal party Liberal Democracy (DL), a sizeable portion of the Union for French Democracy (UDF), merged their parties into the new party over the course of the first year. The UDF's Christian Democrats (such as Philippe Douste-Blazy and Jacques Barrot), the Radical Party and the centrist Popular Party for French Democracy (both associate parties of the UDF until 2002), aligned themselves with the party for the 2002 French legislative election. In the UMP four major French political families were thus represented: Gaullism, republicanism (the kind of liberalism put forward by parties like the Democratic Republican Alliance or the PR, heir of DL), Christian democracy (Popularism) and radicalism.

Chirac's close ally Alain Juppé became the party's first president at the party's founding congress at the Bourget in November 2002. Juppé won 79.42% of the vote, defeating Nicolas Dupont-Aignan, the leader of the party's Eurosceptic Arise the Republic faction, and three other candidates. During the party's earlier years, it was marked by tensions and rivalries between Juppé and other chiraquiens and supporters of Nicolas Sarkozy, the then-Minister of the Interior.

In the 2004 regional elections, the UMP suffered a heavy blow, winning the presidencies of only 2 out of 22 regions in metropolitan France (Alsace and Corsica) and only half of the departments (the right had previously won numerous departmental presidencies) in the simultaneous 2004 cantonal elections. In the 2004 European Parliament election on 13 June 2004, the UMP also suffered another heavy blow, winning 16.6% of the vote, far behind the Socialist Party (PS), and only 16 seats.

The membership in the early 2000s grew from 100,000 to 300,000 after members received a greater say in the selection of the party's presidential candidate.

=== Nicolas Sarkozy (2004–2012) ===
Juppé resigned the party's presidency on 15 July 2004 after being found guilty in a corruption scandal in January of the same year. Nicolas Sarkozy rapidly announced that he would take over the presidency of the UMP and resign his position as finance minister, ending months of speculation. On 28 November 2004, Sarkozy was elected to the party's presidency with 85.09% of the votes against 9.1% for Dupont-Aignan and 5.82% for Christine Boutin, the leader of the UMP's social conservatives. Having gained control of what had been Chirac's party, Sarkozy focused the party machinery and his energies on the 2007 presidential election.

The failure of the referendum on the European Constitution on 25 May 2005 led to the fall of the government of Jean-Pierre Raffarin and to the formation of a new cabinet, presided by another UMP politician, Dominique de Villepin. However, during this time, the UMP under Sarkozy gained a record number of new members and rejuvenated itself in preparation of the 2007 election. On 14 January 2007, Sarkozy was nominated unopposed as the UMP's presidential candidate for the 2007 election.

On the issues, the party under Sarkozy publicly disapproved of Turkey's proposed membership in the European Union, which Chirac had previously endorsed several times publicly, and generally took a more right-wing position.

On 22 April 2007, Nicolas Sarkozy won the plurality of votes in the first round of the 2007 presidential election. On 6 May he faced the Socialist Party candidate Ségolène Royal in the second round and won, taking 53.06% of the vote. As a consequence, he resigned from the presidency of the UMP on 14 May 2007, two days before becoming President of the French Republic. François Fillon was appointed prime minister. On 17 June 2007, at a 2007 legislative election, the UMP gained a majority in the National Assembly with 313 out of 577 seats.

Following Sarkozy's election to the presidency, interim leader Jean-Claude Gaudin prevented a leadership struggle between Patrick Devedjian and Jean-Pierre Raffarin by announcing that the UMP should have a collegial leadership while Sarkozy was President of the Republic. In July, the UMP's national council approved an amendment to the party's statute allowing for a collegial leadership around three vice-presidents (Jean-Pierre Raffarin, Jean-Claude Gaudin and Pierre Méhaignerie) and a secretary-general (Patrick Devedjian) and two associate secretaries-general.

On 9 March 2008, municipal and cantonal elections, the party performed quite poorly, losing numerous cities, such as Toulouse and Strasbourg, as well as eight departmental presidencies to the left. Xavier Bertrand was selected as secretary-general of the party in late 2008 to replace Patrick Devedjian, who resigned to take up a cabinet position.

In the 2009 European Parliament election on 7 June 2009, the UMP ran common lists with its junior allies including Jean-Louis Borloo's Radical Party, the New Centre and Modern Left. The UMP list won 27.9%, a remarkably good result for a governing party in off-year "mid-term" elections, and elected 29 MEPs, significantly improving on the UMP's poor result in the 2004 European election – also an off-year election. However, in the 2010 regional elections on 14 and 21 March 2010, the UMP obtained a very poor result with only 26%. While it lost Corsica, it retained Alsace but also defeated the left in La Réunion and French Guiana.

In a cabinet reshuffle in November 2010, which disappointed centrists within and outside the UMP, François Fillon was confirmed prime minister and Alain Juppé re-joined the government. Among those who resigned from the cabinet were Bernard Kouchner, Hervé Morin and, above all, Jean-Louis Borloo. Xavier Bertrand, who re-joined the government, was replaced as general-secretary of the UMP by Jean-François Copé on 17 November 2010.

The party suffered another major electoral defeat in the 2011 cantonal elections held on 20 and 27 March 2011, and in September, the centre-right lost control of the French Senate for the first time in the history of the Fifth Republic.

In May 2011, during a party congress, the Radical Party, led by Borloo, decided to leave the UMP and launch The Alliance, a new centrist coalition.

The party opted not to organise primaries ahead of the 2012 presidential election and endorsed Nicolas Sarkozy's bid for second term. Sarkozy lost reelection to the Socialist Party candidate François Hollande on 6 May 2012, winning 48.36% in the runoff. The party was defeated by the new president's left-wing majority in the subsequent legislative election.

=== After May 2012 ===
Prior to Sarkozy's defeat on 6 May, the UMP's secretary-general Jean-François Copé announced that he supported the creation of internal "movements" within the party and the organisation of primaries for the next presidential election.

==== Campaign for the November 2012 congress ====
The UMP's political bureau announced the organisation of a party congress on 18 and 25 November 2012, leading prominent party leaders to organise factions and "movements" to influence the party's new direction.

Ultimately, two candidates amassed the required endorsements to run for the party's presidency: former prime minister François Fillon and incumbent party secretary-general Jean-François Copé. Nathalie Kosciusko-Morizet, Bruno Le Maire, Xavier Bertrand, Henri Guaino, and Dominique Dord had also announced their candidacies but did not meet tough candidacy requirements.

The campaign between Fillon and Copé lasted two months. Fillon had a strong lead in polls of UMP 'sympathizers' (as opposed to actual members, who would be the only eligible voters) and was backed by most UMP parliamentarians while Copé claimed he was the candidate of party activists rather than party 'barons'. However, Copé remained as secretary-general and retained control of the party machinery.

While Fillon's campaign was regarded as more consensual, moderate and centre-right; Copé campaigned as the candidate of the droite décomplexée ('uninhibited right') and introduced issues such as anti-white racism. However, both candidates received support from moderate and conservative members of the party and their main differences were in rhetoric, style and temperament. Copé, again, appeared more militant and activist, saying that he would support and participate in street demonstrations while Fillon disagreed with his rival.

Six 'motions' (declarations of principles) were submitted to party voters; under the new statutes, motions which won over 10% of the vote at the congress would be recognised as "movements" by the UMP leadership, granted financial autonomy and receive positions in the party structures.

==== Results and subsequent crisis ====
The vote on 18 November saw high turnout but was quickly marred by allegations of irregularities and potential fraud on both sides. Both candidates proclaimed victory within 20 minutes of each other on the night of the vote.

Twenty four hours later, the control commission in charge of the vote (COCOE) announced Copé's victory by only 98 votes. While Fillon initially conceded defeat, by 21 November, his campaign claimed victory anew, with a 26-vote advantage over Copé. Fillon's campaign argued that the COCOE had failed to take into account votes cast in three overseas federations.

Party elder Alain Juppé accepted to lead a mediation between both candidates on 23 November, but it failed within two days. Fillon's announced "precautionary seizure" of ballots cast "to protect them from tampering or alteration" and threatened to take the matter to court. On 26 November, the party appeals commission – led by a close supporter of Copé – decided in Copé's favour and rejected Fillon's arguments.

On 27 November, 72 filloniste parliamentarians in the National Assembly announced the creation of a new parliamentary group, the Rassemblement-UMP, led by Fillon. Copé took up former president Nicolas Sarkozy's proposal of organising a referendum on a revote, but he saw the creation of the dissident filloniste group as a casus belli and took back his proposal. Luc Chatel, the new vice-president and a Copé supporter, later announced that he supported a new presidential vote and a modification of party statutes. The next day, Copé announced that he favoured organising a referendum the modification of party statutes and a reduction of his own term as president to two years (until November 2014); while Fillon welcomed the "consensus on the organisation of a new election" he rejected his rival's timeline and called for a new election before 2014. 'Unaligned' members of the UMP led by Bruno Le Maire and Nathalie Kosciusko-Morizet appealed for the organisation of a new election in the spring of 2013 and a reform of the party statutes.

==== Resolution ====
Both rivals reached an agreement at the end of December 2012, with Copé agreeing to the organisation of a new election and a modification of party statutes while Fillon agreed to dissolve his parliamentary group.

The party's leadership was reorganized in January 2013 to accommodate Copé and Fillon's supporters: Laurent Wauquiez and Valérie Pécresse joined Luc Chatel and Michèle Tabarot as vice-president and secretary-general respectively. Christian Estrosi, Gérard Longuet, Henri de Raincourt (pro-Fillon), Jean-Claude Gaudin, Brice Hortefeux and Roger Karoutchi (pro-Copé) also became vice-presidents. Other positions in the party hierarchy were divided between supporters of both candidates. New leaders were also nominated in February 2013.

==== Bygmalion scandal ====
Several spending scandals appeared in 2014. In early 2014, the Bygmalion scandal (fr) pushed the party's leader Jean-François Copé to resign. In early July, Sarkozy got held in custody due to possible spying and active corruption of the judiciary system. On 8 July 2014, the UMP was discovered to have a hidden debt of €79.1 million for the year 2013. On 20 May 2021, the criminal trial began for Sarkozy and 13 other defendants who were said to have been involved in the Bygmalion scandal. The scandal allegations that Sarkozy diverting tens of millions of euros which was intended to be spent on his failed 2012 re-election campaign and then hiring a PR firm to cover it up. The illicit campaign finance money which was not reported as being spent on Sarkozy's re-election campaign was instead used to overspend on lavish campaign rallies and events. On 30 September 2021, Sarkozy and his co-defendants would be convicted for violating France's campaign finance spending limit law. For this conviction, Sarkozy was given a 1-year prison sentence, though he was also given the option to instead serve this sentence at home with an electronic bracelet.

=== Name change and dissolution ===
After the election of Nicolas Sarkozy, the former President of France (2007–2012), as president of the Union for a Popular Movement (UMP) in November 2014, he put forward a request to the party's general committee to change its name to the Republicans as well as the statutes of the party. With the name already chosen Nathalie Kosciusko-Morizet, vice president of the UMP, presented Nicolas Sarkozy and the party's political bureau a project of new statutes. The proposed statutes provided for, among others, the election of the presidents of the departmental federations by direct suffrage, the end of the political currents and consulting members on election nominations.

Critics of Sarkozy claimed it was illegal for him to name the party "Republicans" because every French person is a republican in that they support the values and ideals of the French Republic that emanated from the French Revolution, and as such the term is above party politics. The new name was adopted by the bureau on 5 May 2015 and approved by the party membership on 28 May by an online yes vote of 83.28% on a 45.74% participation after a court ruling in favor of Sarkozy. Similarly the new party statutes are adopted by 96.34% of voters and the composition of the new party's political bureau by 94.77%. The Republicans thus became the legal successor of the UMP as the leading centre-right party in France.

== Ideology and platform ==
The UMP was a party of the centre-right belonging to the Gaullist lineage, and was variously described as liberal-conservative, conservative, conservative-liberal, and Christian democratic.

The UMP believed that each individual's destiny must be unencumbered and it rejects political systems which "stifle economic freedom". It said that work, merit, innovation and personal initiative must be encouraged to reduce unemployment and boost economic growth; but at the same time, it maintained that adherence to the rule of law and the authority of the state is necessary. In a Gaullist tradition, the UMP supported solidarity, with the state guaranteeing social protection of less fortunate individuals. But in a more liberal vein, the party always denounced l'assistanat, a French term which can refer to "welfare handouts".

The party took more nationalist positions at times, and often adopted tough stances against immigration and illegal immigration. It strongly supported the integration and assimilation of immigrants into French society and always denounced communitarianism as a danger to the French nation-state. However, the UMP traditionally was a strong proponent of European integration and the European Union, albeit sometimes with a hint of traditional Gaullist souverainism.

Under Nicolas Sarkozy's leadership, the UMP adopted a liberal and security-oriented platform. His platform in the 2007 and 2012 presidential elections emphasised the ideas of personal responsibility and individual initiative. He developed the idea of "working more to earn more", promising that overtime hours would not be taxed and employers exonerated from non-wage labour costs. Under his presidency, the government's short-lived tax cap for high-income earners was denounced by the left but also several centrist and centre-right politicians within or outside the UMP.

Having gained his popularity as a 'hardliner' Interior minister, Sarkozy's policies also carried a strong law-and-order and tough on crime orientation. He supported tougher sentences for criminals and repeat offenders. As candidate and president, he placed heavy emphasis on immigration and national identity, presenting immigration as a danger to French identity and as source of increased criminality. As president, he imposed stricter limits on family reunification, created a Ministry of Immigration, and National Identity for three years between 2007 and 2010, launched a controversial national dialogue on national identity and expelled thousands of Roma from illegal camps.

Critics of the right-wing government denounced what they felt was a rapprochement with the controversial far-right National Front (FN). While several members of the UMP's right-wing have indicated that they would favour local alliances with the FN and prefer to vote for a FN candidate over a Socialist Party or left-wing candidate in runoff elections between the left and the FN; the party's official position continues to reject alliances with the FN at any level but also opposes so-called "republican fronts" with the left against the FN.

== Factions ==
The UMP's original statutes in 2002 allowed for the organisation of formal factions or movements within the party, to represent the various political families of which it was made up. However, fearing leadership rivalries and divisions, Juppé, Chirac and later Sarkozy 'postponed' the creation of such organised movements indefinitely. Nevertheless, prior to the organisations of formal "movements" in November 2012, there existed informal groupings of like-minded members, either through associations, political clubs, associated political parties or even informal factions.

Jean-François Copé allowed for the organisation of formal movements within the party following the November 2012 congress. According to the party's statutes, motions backed by at least 10 parliamentarians from 10 departmental federations and which obtain at least 10% support from members at a congress are recognised as movements. They are granted financial autonomy by way of a fixed grant and additional funding in proportion to the votes they obtained; but the sum of funds transferred by the party to its movements can be no larger than 30% of the annual public subsidies the UMP receives from the state.

=== Official movement and factions ===
Six motions representing various ideological tendencies within the party ran to be recognised as official movements following the November 2012 congress. Five of these motions met the conditions to be recognised as such, and their leaders have since integrated the UMP's leadership structure:

- The Strong Right (La Droite forte): 27.77%
  - Sarkozysts (conservatives, liberal-conservatives, conservative-liberals, social conservatives): Nicolas Sarkozy, Jean-Claude Gaudin, Jean-Pierre Raffarin, Édouard Balladur, Dominique Bussereau, Michel Barnier, Dominique Perben, Jean-François Mattei, Renaud Donnedieu de Vabres, Charles Millon, Alain Lamassoure, Brice Hortefeux, Joseph Daul, Rachida Dati, Bernard Accoyer, Marie-Hélène Descamps
  - Blue Ecology (centrist ecologists): Nathalie Kosciusko-Morizet
- The Social Right (La Droite sociale): 21.69%
  - Social Gaullists or Séguinists (left-wing Gaullists, social democrats, Eurosceptics): François Fillon, Roger Karoutchi, Henri Guaino, Yves Guéna, Alain Marleix
- Modern and Humanist France (France moderne et humaniste): 18.17%
  - The Reformers (classical liberals): Hervé Novelli, Gérard Longuet, Alain Madelin, Patrick Devedjian, Philippe Cochet, Jean-Pierre Soisson, Claude Goasguen, Pierre Lellouche, Luc Chatel, Louis Giscard d'Estaing, Jean-Jacques Descamps
  - Democratic and Popular (Christian democrats, centrists): Philippe Douste-Blazy, Pierre Méhaignerie, Adrien Zeller, Jacques Barrot, Nicole Fontaine, Marc-Philippe Daubresse, Alain Joyandet, Antoine Herth
  - The Progressives (social liberals, former members of the Socialist Party): Éric Besson
  - Christian Democratic Party (social conservatives, Christian democrats): Christine Boutin, Jean-Frédéric Poisson
- Gaullism, a way forward for France (Le Gaullisme, une voie d'avenir pour la France): 12.31%
  - Neo-Gaullists, formerly known also as Chiraquiens (right-wing slightly liberal Gaullists, secular-minded conservatives): Jacques Chirac, Michèle Alliot-Marie, Dominique de Villepin, Jean-Louis Debré, Jean-François Copé, Alain Juppé, Patrick Ollier, François Baroin, Xavier Bertrand, Xavier Darcos, Valérie Pécresse, Christine Albanel, Éric Wœrth, Roger Karoutchi, Josselin de Rohan, Adrien Gouteyron, Hervé Mariton
  - The Free Right (conservative-liberals, souverainists): Rachid Kaci, Alexandre del Valle, Étienne Blanc, François d'Aubert
- The Popular Right (La Droite populaire): 10.87%
  - Initiative and Liberty Movement (Gaullists, national-conservatives): Bernard Debré, Eric Raoult, Jean Tiberi
  - Rally for France (national-conservatives, souverainists): Charles Pasqua, Lionnel Luca, Jacques Myard, Jean-Jacques Guillet, Philippe Pemezec

=== Associate parties ===
The Hunting, Fishing, Nature, Tradition, the Christian Democratic Party, the Rally for France and The Progressives are associate parties of the UMP. By adhering to these parties, members also adhered to the UMP and could participate in the UMP's inner organisation. The Radical Party was associated with the UMP from 2002 through 2011.

Overseas parties associated with the UMP included O Porinetia To Tatou Ai'a in French Polynesia and The Rally–UMP in New Caledonia.

=== 2012 leadership election ===
The aforementioned November 2012 congress saw the division of the party between the two candidates who sought the party's presidency, François Fillon and Jean-François Copé – the fillonistes and copéistes.

- Copéistes (supporters of Jean-François Copé): Jean-François Copé, Luc Chatel, Michèle Tabarot, Jean-Claude Gaudin, Jean-Pierre Raffarin, Marc-Philippe Daubresse, Hervé Novelli, Christian Jacob, Lionnel Luca, Thierry Mariani, Guillaume Peltier, Rachida Dati, Brice Hortefeux, Nadine Morano, Jean Sarkozy, Valérie Rosso-Debord etc.
- Fillonistes (supporters of François Fillon): François Fillon, Laurent Wauquiez, Valérie Pécresse, Xavier Bertrand, Christian Estrosi, Éric Ciotti, Gérard Larcher, François Baroin, Patrick Devedjian, Dominique Bussereau, Valérie Boyer, Dominique Dord, Patrick Ollier, Éric Woerth, Hubert Falco, Gérard Longuet etc.
- Unaligned members: Bruno Le Maire, Nathalie Kosciusko-Morizet. Nicolas Sarkozy and Alain Juppé also remained neutral and did not officially endorse any candidate.

== Elected officials ==
- Deputies: 186 members and nine caucusing members in the UMP group in the National Assembly. This group also includes some members of the Radical Party, the Christian Democratic Party and Miscellaneous Right deputies.
- Senators: 131 members in the UMP group in the Senate. This group also includes members of the Radical Party and The Rally-UMP
- MEPs: 24 members in the EPP Group in the European Parliament.

=== Major officeholders ===
- Nicolas Sarkozy (President of the Republic, 2007–2012)
- François Fillon (Prime Minister, 2007–2012)
- Bernard Accoyer (President of the National Assembly)
- Jean-Louis Debré (President of the Constitutional Council)
- Joseph Daul (President of the EPP Group in the European Parliament)

== Popular support ==
The UMP's electoral base reflects that of the old Rally for the Republic (RPR) and, in some cases, that of the Union for French Democracy (UDF). In the 2007 presidential election, Nicolas Sarkozy performed best in the east of France – particularly Alsace (36.2%); Provence-Alpes-Côte-d'Azur (37.0%) – the wealthy coastal department of the Alpes-Maritimes (43.6%) was his best department in France; Champagne-Ardenne (32.7%) and Rhône-Alpes (32.7%).

These areas were among National Front candidate Jean-Marie Le Pen's best regions in 2002 and are conservative on issues such as immigration. Sarkozy received a lot of votes from voters who had supported the far-right in April 2002. For example, in the Alpes-Maritimes, Sarkozy performed 21.6% better than Chirac did in 2002 while Le Pen lost 12.6% in five years. Sarkozy also appealed more than average to blue-collar workers in regions such as northern Meurthe-et-Moselle and the Nord-Pas-de-Calais, although most of these regions, despite his gains, remain reliably left-wing.

The party is also strong in every election in wealthy suburban or coastal (and, in some cases, urban) areas such as Neuilly-sur-Seine (72.6% for Sarkozy in the first round), Saint-Tropez (54.79%), Cannes (48.19%) or Marcq-en-Barœul (47.35%). It is strong in most rural areas, like most conservative parties in the world, but this does not extend to the rural areas of the south of France, areas which are old strongholds of republican and secular ideals. However, in old "clerical" Catholic rural areas, such as parts of Lozère or Cantal, it is very strong, as was the UDF during its hey day.

However, the UMP does poorly in one of the UDF's best regions, Brittany, where the decline of religious practice, a moderate electorate and urbanisation has hurt the UMP and also the UDF. Nicolas Sarkozy performed relatively poorly in departments with a large share of moderate Christian democratic (often centrist or centre-right) voters, such as Lozère where the Socialist candidate Ségolène Royal performed better (44.3%) than François Mitterrand had in his 1988 left-wing landslide (43.1%). While former president Jacques Chirac, the right's strongman in normally left-wing Corrèze had always done very well in Corrèze and the surrounding departments, Sarkozy did very poorly and actually lost the department in the 2007 runoff. However, in the 2009 European election, the UMP's results in those departments were superior to Sarkozy's first round result (nationally, they were 4% lower).

== Leadership ==
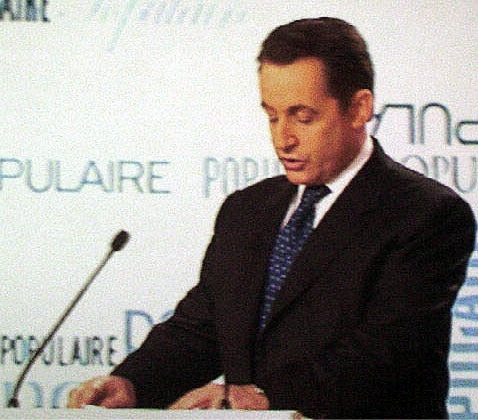
Nicolas Sarkozy speaking at a UMP party congress in 2004

=== Presidents ===
No.	Name	Photo	Began	Left
1	Alain Juppé		17 November 2002	16 July 2004
—	Interim; Jean-Claude Gaudin		16 July 2004	28 November 2004
2	Nicolas Sarkozy		28 November 2004	14 May 2007
—	Vacant (Secretaries-general as the head of the party): Pierre Méhaignerie: 14 May 2007 – 25 September 2007 Patrick Devedjian: 25 September 2007 – 5 December 2008 Xavier Bertrand: 5 December 2008 – 17 November 2010 Jean-François Copé: 17 November 2010 – 19 November 2012		14 May 2007	19 November 2012
3	Jean-François Copé		19 November 2012	15 June 2014
—	Interim: Alain Juppé, / Jean-Pierre Raffarin, & / François Fillon		15 June 2014	October 2014
(2)	Nicolas Sarkozy		30 November 2014	30 May 2015

=== Vice presidents ===
- Jean-Claude Gaudin, executive vice president (2002–2007)
- Jean-Claude Gaudin, Pierre Méhaignerie, Jean-Pierre Raffarin as vice presidents of the national council (2007–2012)
- Luc Chatel (2012–2014), associate vice president from January 2013
  - joined by Laurent Wauquiez, Jean-Claude Gaudin, Christian Estrosi, Brice Hortefeux, Roger Karoutchi, Gérard Longuet and Henri de Raincourt (January 2013 – May 2015)
  - joined by Hubert Falco, Rachida Dati, Hervé Gaymard, Christian Kert, Jean-François Lamour, Jean-Paul Fournier, Jean-Pierre Audy, Guillaume Peltier, Jean Leonetti, Thierry Mariani, Patrick Ollier and Bernard Perrut (January 2013 – May 2015)

=== Presidents of the National Council ===
- unknown (2002–2013)
- Jean-Pierre Raffarin (2013–2015)

=== Secretaries-general ===
- Philippe Douste-Blazy (2002–2004)
- Pierre Méhaignerie (2004–2007)
- Patrick Devedjian (2007–2008)
- Xavier Bertrand (2008–2010)
- Jean-François Copé (2010–2012)
- Michèle Tabarot (2012–2015)
  - joined by Valérie Pécresse and Marc-Philippe Daubresse (January 2013 – 2015)

=== Group leaders in the National Assembly ===
- Jacques Barrot (2002–2004)
- Bernard Accoyer (2004–2007)
- Jean-François Copé (2007–2010)
- Christian Jacob (2010–2015)

=== Group leaders in the Senate ===
- Josselin de Rohan (2002–2008)
- Henri de Raincourt (2008–2009)
- Gérard Longuet (2009–2011)
- Jean-Claude Gaudin (2011–2015)

== Election results ==
=== Presidential ===
President of the French Republic
Election	Candidate	First round		Second round		Result
Election	Candidate	Votes	%	Votes	%	Result
2002	Jacques Chirac	5,665,855	19.88%	25,537,956	82.21%	Won
2007	Nicolas Sarkozy	11,448,663	31.18%	18,983,138	53.06%	Won
2012	Nicolas Sarkozy	9,753,629	27.18%	16,860,685	48.36%	Lost

=== National Assembly ===
National Assembly
Election	Leader	First round		Second round		Seats	Position	Result
Election	Leader	Votes	%	Votes	%	Seats	Position	Result
2002	Jean-Pierre Raffarin	8,408,023	33.30%	10,026,669	47.26%	357 / 577	1st	Government
2007	François Fillon	10,289,737	39.54%	9,460,710	46.36%	313 / 577	1st	Government
2012	Jean-François Copé	7,037,268	27.12%	8,740,625	34.49%	194 / 577	2nd	Opposition

=== European Parliament ===
European Parliament
Election	Leader	Votes	%	Seats	Position
2004	Jean-Pierre Raffarin	2,856,368	16.64%	17 / 74	2nd
2009	Xavier Bertrand	4,799,908	27.88%	29 / 74	1st
2014	Jean-François Copé	3,942,766	20.80%	20 / 74	2nd

== See also ==
- Politics of France
- List of political parties in France
- Tree of Liberty (symbol)
