= List of French senators (2014–2017) =

List by departments of the senators of Senate of France (2014-2017) elected in the various renewals.

== List of senators by departments ==
Département	Name	Party	Group	Born	Place	Country	Photo
01 - Ain	Sylvie Goy-Chavent	UDI	UDI-UC	May 23, 1963	Nord (Dunkirk)	France	
01 - Ain	Patrick Chaize	UMP	UMP	Mar 22, 1963		France	
01 - Ain	Rachel Mazuir	PS	SOC	Feb 12, 1940		France	
02 - Aisne	Pascale Gruny	UMP	UMP	Feb 18, 1960	Nord (Cambrai)	France	
02 - Aisne	Antoine Lefèvre	UMP	UMP	Feb 18, 1966	Düsseldorf	Germany	
02 - Aisne	Yves Daudigny	PS	SOC	Feb 23, 1947	Aisne (Chavignon)	France	
03 - Allier	Gérard Dériot	UMP	UMP	Nov 1, 1944	Allier (Louroux-Hodement)	France	
03 - Allier	Claude Malhuret	UMP	UMP	Mar 8, 1950	Bas-Rhin (Strasbourg)	France	
04 - Alpes-de-Haute-Provence	Jean-Yves Roux	PS	SOC	Jan 18, 1970	Alpes-de-Haute-Provence (Digne-les-Bains)	France	
05 - Hautes-Alpes	Jean-Yves Dusserre	UMP	UMP	Jan 1, 1953	Hautes-Alpes (Gap)	France	
06 - Alpes-Maritimes	Dominique Estrosi Sassone	UMP	UMP	Nov 14, 1958	Alpes-Maritimes (Nice)	France	
06 - Alpes-Maritimes	Colette Giudicelli	UMP	UMP	Nov 24, 1943	Algiers	Algeria	
06 - Alpes-Maritimes	Jean-Pierre Leleux	UMP	UMP	May 8, 1947	Ghent	Belgium	
06 - Alpes-Maritimes	Louis Nègre	UMP	UMP	Feb 8, 1947	Alpes-Maritimes (Nice)	France	
06 - Alpes-Maritimes	Marc Daunis	PS	SOC	Apr 22, 1955	Alpes-Maritimes (Saint-Jean-Cap-Ferrat)	France	
07 - Ardèche	Mathieu Darnaud	UMP	UMP	Jul 11, 1975	Drôme (Valence)	France	
07 - Ardèche	Jacques Genest	UMP	UMP	Aug 6, 1950	Drôme (Tain-l'Hermitage)	France	
08 - Ardennes	Benoît Huré	UMP	UMP	Jun 5, 1953	Ardennes (Neuville-lez-Beaulieu)	France	
08 - Ardennes	Marc Laménie	UMP	UMP	Jul 11, 1956	Ardennes (Givet)	France	
09 - Ariège	Alain Duran	PS	SOC	Jan 2, 1958		France	
10 - Aube	Philippe Adnot	DVD	RASNAG	Aug 25, 1945	Aube (Rhèges)	France	
10 - Aube	François Baroin	UMP	UMP	Jun 21, 1965	Paris	France	
11 - Aude	Roland Courteau	PS	SOC	Feb 24, 1943		France	
11 - Aude	Gisèle Jourda	PS	SOC	Mar 24, 1955		France	
12 - Aveyron	Jean-Claude Luche	UDI	UDI-UC	Aug 7, 1952	Aveyron (Pierrefiche)	France	
12 - Aveyron	Alain Marc	UMP	UMP	Jan 29, 1957	Paris	France	
13 - Bouches-du-Rhône	Jean-Claude Gaudin	UMP	UMP	Oct 8, 1939	Bouches-du-Rhône (Marseille)	France	
13 - Bouches-du-Rhône	Bruno Gilles	UMP	UMP	Dec 26, 1960	Bouches-du-Rhône (Marseille)	France	
13 - Bouches-du-Rhône	Sophie Joissains	UDI	UDI-UC	Oct 25, 1969		France	
13 - Bouches-du-Rhône	Michel Amiel	DVG	RASNAG	Jul 3, 1954		France	
13 - Bouches-du-Rhône	Jean-Noël Guérini	DVG	RASNAG	Jan 1, 1951	Haute-Corse (Calenzana)	France	
13 - Bouches-du-Rhône	Mireille Jouve	DVG	RASNAG	Dec 30, 1960	Bouches-du-Rhône (Aix-en-Provence)	France	
13 - Bouches-du-Rhône	Stéphane Ravier	FN	RASNAG	Aug 4, 1969	Hautes-Alpes (Gap)	France	
13 - Bouches-du-Rhône	Samia Ghali	PS	SOC	Jun 10, 1968	Bouches-du-Rhône (Marseille)	France	
14 - Calvados	Jean-Léonce Dupont	UDI	UDI-UC	Jan 31, 1955	Calvados (Bayeux)	France	
14 - Calvados	Pascal Allizard	UMP	UMP	Dec 19, 1962	Paris	France	
14 - Calvados	François Aubey	PS	SOC	Sep 20, 1960	Calvados (Caen)	France	
15 - Cantal	Jacques Mézard	PRG	RDSE	Dec 3, 1947	Cantal (Aurillac)	France	
15 - Cantal	Pierre Jarlier	UDI	UDI-UC	Jul 14, 1954	Cantal (Saint-Flour)	France	
16 - Charente	Nicole Bonnefoy	PS	SOC	Aug 11, 1958		France	
16 - Charente	Michel Boutant	PS	SOC	Nov 23, 1956	Charente (Chabanais)	France	
17 - Charente-Maritime	Corinne Imbert	UMP	UMP	Nov 20, 1958		France	
17 - Charente-Maritime	Daniel Laurent	UMP	UMP	Feb 4, 1949		France	
17 - Charente-Maritime	Bernard Lalande	PS	SOC	Apr 6, 1954		France	
18 - Cher	François Pillet	UMP	UMP	May 13, 1950		France	
18 - Cher	Rémy Pointereau	UMP	UMP	Mar 30, 1953	Eure-et-Loir (Loigny-la-Bataille)	France	
19 - Corrèze	Daniel Chasseing	DVD	UMP	Apr 10, 1945	Corrèze (Le Lonzac)	France	
19 - Corrèze	Claude Nougein	UMP	UMP	Dec 16, 1946		France	
2A - Corse-du-Sud	Jean-Jacques Panunzi	UMP	UMP	Apr 5, 1956	Corse-du-Sud (Ajaccio)	France	
2B - Haute-Corse	Joseph Castelli	PRG	RDSE	Jun 4, 1948	Haute-Corse (Penta-di-Casinca)	France	
21 - Côte-d'Or	Alain Houpert	UMP	UMP	Aug 13, 1957	Côte-d'Or (Dijon)	France	
21 - Côte-d'Or	Anne-Catherine Loisier	UDI	UDI-UC	Mar 13, 1969	French Guiana (Cayenne)	France	
21 - Côte-d'Or	François Patriat	PS	SOC	Mar 21, 1943	Côte-d'Or (Semur-en-Auxois)	France	
22 - Côtes-d'Armor	Yannick Botrel	PS	SOC	Dec 9, 1951		France	
22 - Côtes-d'Armor	Christine Prunaud	PCF	CRC	Sep 4, 1950		France	
22 - Côtes-d'Armor	Michel Vaspart	UMP	UMP	Feb 22, 1948	Val-de-Marne (Créteil)	France	
23 - Creuse	Éric Jeansannetas	PS	SOC	Oct 21, 1962		France	
23 - Creuse	Jean-Jacques Lozach	PS	SOC	Feb 8, 1954	Creuse (Bourganeuf)	France	
24 - Dordogne	Claude Bérit-Débat	PS	SOC	Feb 19, 1946	Pyrénées-Atlantiques (Mirepeix)	France	
24 - Dordogne	Bernard Cazeau	PS	SOC	Apr 27, 1939	Gironde (Bordeaux)	France	
25 - Doubs	Martial Bourquin	PS	SOC	Jul 23, 1952		France	
25 - Doubs	Jacques Grosperrin	UMP	UMP	Oct 17, 1955	Baden-Baden	Germany	
25 - Doubs	Jean-François Longeot	UDI	UDI-UC	Dec 27, 1956	Marne (Reims)	France	
26 - Drôme	Didier Guillaume	PS	SOC	May 11, 1959	Drôme (Bourg-de-Péage)	France	
26 - Drôme	Marie-Pierre Monier	PS	SOC	Feb 28, 1958		France	
26 - Drôme	Gilbert Bouchet	UMP	UMP	Jan 8, 1947	Ardèche (La Voulte-sur-Rhône)	France	
27 - Eure	Hervé Maurey	UDI	UDI-UC	May 7, 1961		France	
27 - Eure	Nicole Duranton	UMP	UMP	Oct 13, 1958		France	
27 - Eure	Ladislas Poniatowski	UMP	UMP	Nov 10, 1946	Hauts-de-Seine (Boulogne-Billancourt)	France	
28 - Eure-et-Loir	Gérard Cornu	UMP	UMP	Feb 6, 1952	Ardennes (Aouste)	France	
28 - Eure-et-Loir	Chantal Deseyne	UMP	UMP	Jan 29, 1957		France	
28 - Eure-et-Loir	Albéric de Montgolfier	UMP	UMP	Jul 6, 1964	Hauts-de-Seine (Neuilly-sur-Seine)	France	
29 - Finistère	Maryvonne Blondin	PS	SOC	Jan 20, 1947	Finistère (Quimper)	France	
29 - Finistère	François Marc	PS	SOC	Mar 19, 1950	Finistère (Plougoulm)	France	
29 - Finistère	Philippe Paul	UMP	UMP	Jan 25, 1965	Finistère (Douarnenez)	France	
29 - Finistère	Michel Canévet	UDI	UDI-UC	Dec 17, 1960	Finistère (Pont-l'Abbé)	France	
30 - Gard	Jean-Paul Fournier	UMP	UMP	Oct 16, 1945	Gard (Génolhac)	France	
30 - Gard	Vivette Lopez	UMP	UMP	Dec 27, 1954		France	
30 - Gard	Simon Sutour	PS	SOC	Aug 18, 1952	Hérault (Sète)	France	
31 - Haute-Garonne	Alain Chatillon	UDI	UMP	Mar 15, 1943	Haute-Garonne (Revel)	France	
31 - Haute-Garonne	Pierre Médevielle	UDI	UDI-UC	Apr 17, 1960		France	
31 - Haute-Garonne	Brigitte Micouleau	UMP	UMP	Sep 10, 1951		France	
31 - Haute-Garonne	Claude Raynal	PS	SOC	Oct 10, 1957		France	
31 - Haute-Garonne	Françoise Laborde	PRG	RDSE	Jul 8, 1958		France	
32 - Gers	Aymeri de Montesquiou	UDI	UDI-UC	Jul 7, 1942	Gers (Marsan)	France	
32 - Gers	Franck Montaugé	PS	SOC	Sep 14, 1961	Gers (Condom)	France	
33 - Gironde	Gérard César	UMP	UMP	Dec 19, 1934	Gironde (Caudéran)	France	
33 - Gironde	Marie-Hélène des Esgaulx	UMP	UMP	May 26, 1950	Landes (Dax)	France	
33 - Gironde	Xavier Pintat	UMP	UMP	Mar 15, 1954	Gironde (Bordeaux)	France	
33 - Gironde	Alain Anziani	PS	SOC	May 30, 1951	Paris	France	
33 - Gironde	Françoise Cartron	PS	SOC	Mar 27, 1949	Landes (Saint-Vincent-de-Tyrosse)	France	
33 - Gironde	Philippe Madrelle	PS	SOC	Apr 21, 1937	Gironde (Saint-Seurin-de-Cursac)	France	
34 - Hérault	Jean-Pierre Grand	UMP	UMP	Nov 18, 1950	Hérault (Montpellier)	France	
34 - Hérault	François Commeinhes	UMP	UMP	Nov 10, 1949	Hérault (Sète)	France	
34 - Hérault	Henri Cabanel	PS	SOC	Mar 9, 1959	Hérault (Béziers)	France	
34 - Hérault	Robert Navarro	DVG	RASNAG	May 1, 1952	Aude (Cuxac-d'Aude)	France	
35 - Ille-et-Vilaine	Dominique de Legge	UMP	UMP	Feb 18, 1952	Ille-et-Vilaine (Le Pertre)	France	
35 - Ille-et-Vilaine	Françoise Gatel	UDI	UDI-UC	Mar 14, 1953	Morbihan (Rochefort-en-Terre)	France	
35 - Ille-et-Vilaine	Jean-Louis Tourenne	PS	SOC	Aug 25, 1944	Ille-et-Vilaine (La Mézière)	France	
35 - Ille-et-Vilaine	Sylvie Robert	PS	SOC	Aug 28, 1963	Loire-Atlantique (Nantes)	France	
36 - Indre	Jean-François Mayet	UMP	UMP	Jan 30, 1940	Indre (Vatan)	France	
36 - Indre	Louis Pinton	UMP	UMP	Oct 24, 1948		France	
37 - Indre-et-Loire	Jean-Jacques Filleul	PS	SOC	Jun 22, 1943	Indre-et-Loire (Tours)	France	
37 - Indre-et-Loire	Jean Germain	PS	SOC	Sep 11, 1947	Indre-et-Loire (Tours)	France	
37 - Indre-et-Loire	Marie-France Beaufils	PCF	CRC	Nov 22, 1946	Vienne (Pleumartin)	France	
38 - Isère	Jacques Chiron	PS	SOC	Oct 3, 1949		France	
38 - Isère	Éliane Giraud	PS	SOC	Mar 12, 1952	Isère (La Flachère)	France	
38 - Isère	Annie David	PCF	CRC	Jan 17, 1963	Isère (La Tronche)	France	
38 - Isère	Bernard Saugey	UMP	UMP	Mar 3, 1943	Rhône (Lyon)	France	
38 - Isère	Michel Savin	UMP	UMP	Nov 25, 1958	Isère (Grenoble)	France	
39 - Jura	Gérard Bailly	UMP	UMP	Jan 28, 1940	Jura (Uxelles)	France	
39 - Jura	Gilbert Barbier	UMP	RDSE	Mar 3, 1940	Doubs (Amancey)	France	
40 - Landes	Jean-Louis Carrère	PS	SOC	Dec 4, 1944	Pyrénées-Atlantiques (Orthez)	France	
40 - Landes	Danielle Michel	PS	SOC	Apr 3, 1947	Landes (Castets)	France	
41 - Loir-et-Cher	Jacqueline Gourault	MoDem	UDI-UC	Nov 20, 1950	Loir-et-Cher (Montoire-sur-le-Loir)	France	
41 - Loir-et-Cher	Jeanny Lorgeoux	PS	SOC	Jan 2, 1950	Loir-et-Cher (Crouy-sur-Cosson)	France	
42 - Loire	Jean-Claude Frécon	PS	SOC	Sep 3, 1944	Alpes-de-Haute-Provence (Castellane)	France	
42 - Loire	Maurice Vincent	PS	SOC	Sep 20, 1955	Loire (Saint-Étienne)	France	
42 - Loire	Cécile Cukierman	PCF	CRC	Apr 26, 1976		France	
42 - Loire	Bernard Fournier	UMP	UMP	Sep 13, 1946	Loire (Saint-Étienne)	France	
43 - Haute-Loire	Jean Boyer	UDI	UDI-UC	Jan 4, 1937	Haute-Loire (Le Puy-en-Velay)	France	
43 - Haute-Loire	Gérard Roche	UDI	UDI-UC	Dec 29, 1942	Haute-Loire (Le Puy-en-Velay)	France	
44 - Loire-Atlantique	Michelle Meunier	PS	SOC	Jan 24, 1956		France	
44 - Loire-Atlantique	Yannick Vaugrenard	PS	SOC	Jun 25, 1950	Loire-Atlantique (Trignac)	France	
44 - Loire-Atlantique	Ronan Dantec	EELV	ECOLO	Aug 5, 1963	Finistère (Brest)	France	
44 - Loire-Atlantique	André Trillard	UMP	UMP	Oct 24, 1947	Loire-Atlantique (Héric)	France	
44 - Loire-Atlantique	Joël Guerriau	UDI	UDI-UC	Nov 9, 1957	Moselle (Uckange)	France	
45 - Loiret	Jean-Noël Cardoux	UMP	UMP	Dec 18, 1946		France	
45 - Loiret	Éric Doligé	UMP	UMP	May 25, 1943	Paris	France	
45 - Loiret	Jean-Pierre Sueur	PS	SOC	Feb 28, 1947	Pas-de-Calais (Boulogne-sur-Mer)	France	
46 - Lot	Gérard Miquel	PS	SOC	Jun 17, 1946	Lot (Nuzéjouls)	France	
46 - Lot	Jean-Claude Requier	PRG	RDSE	Oct 4, 1947	Lot (Martel)	France	
47 - Lot-et-Garonne	Henri Tandonnet	UDI	UDI-UC	Dec 14, 1949	Lot-et-Garonne (Agen)	France	
47 - Lot-et-Garonne	Pierre Camani	PS	SOC	Feb 19, 1952	Lot-et-Garonne (Saint-Léger)	France	
48 - Lozère	Alain Bertrand	PS	RDSE	Feb 23, 1951	Tarn (Saint-Juéry)	France	
49 - Maine-et-Loire	Daniel Raoul	PS	SOC	Jul 28, 1941	Côtes-d'Armor (Pléhédel)	France	
49 - Maine-et-Loire	Corinne Bouchoux	EELV	ECOLO	Jan 5, 1964	Hauts-de-Seine (Issy-les-Moulineaux)	France	
49 - Maine-et-Loire	Christophe Béchu	UMP	UMP	Jun 11, 1974	Maine-et-Loire (Angers)	France	
49 - Maine-et-Loire	Catherine Deroche	UMP	UMP	Feb 24, 1953	Maine-et-Loire (Beaupréau)	France	
50 - Manche	Philippe Bas	UMP	UMP	Jul 20, 1958	Paris	France	
50 - Manche	Jean Bizet	UMP	UMP	Aug 30, 1947	Manche (Le Teilleul)	France	
50 - Manche	Jean-Pierre Godefroy	PS	SOC	Sep 23, 1944	Loire-Atlantique (Indre)	France	
51 - Marne	Yves Détraigne	UDI	UDI-UC	Dec 21, 1954	Marne (Reims)	France	
51 - Marne	Françoise Férat	UDI	UDI-UC	Mar 5, 1949	Marne (Épernay)	France	
51 - Marne	René-Paul Savary	UMP	UMP	Jan 3, 1953		France	
52 - Haute-Marne	Charles Guené	UMP	UMP	Apr 6, 1952	Hauts-de-Seine (Puteaux)	France	
52 - Haute-Marne	Bruno Sido	UMP	UMP	Feb 19, 1951	Paris	France	
53 - Mayenne	Élisabeth Doineau	UDI	UDI-UC	Apr 7, 1961	Loire-Atlantique (Nantes)	France	
53 - Mayenne	François Zocchetto	UDI	UDI-UC	Dec 14, 1958	Mayenne (Laval)	France	
54 - Meurthe-et-Moselle	Daniel Reiner	PS	SOC	Jan 17, 1941	Tarn-et-Garonne (Moissac)	France	
54 - Meurthe-et-Moselle	Évelyne Didier	PCF	CRC	Mar 14, 1948		France	
54 - Meurthe-et-Moselle	Philippe Nachbar	UMP	UMP	Sep 26, 1950		France	
54 - Meurthe-et-Moselle	Jean-François Husson	DVD	UMP	Apr 17, 1961		France	
55 - Meuse	Gérard Longuet	UMP	UMP	Feb 24, 1946	Hauts-de-Seine (Neuilly-sur-Seine)	France	
55 - Meuse	Christian Namy	UDI	UDI-UC	Oct 19, 1938	Bouches-du-Rhône (Marseille)	France	
56 - Morbihan	Odette Herviaux	PS	SOC	Jan 6, 1948	Finistère (Brest)	France	
56 - Morbihan	Michel Le Scouarnec	PCF	CRC	Jul 12, 1949	Morbihan (Meslan)	France	
56 - Morbihan	Joël Labbé	EELV	ECOLO	Oct 18, 1952	Morbihan (Saint-Nolff)	France	
57 - Moselle	Jean-Marc Todeschini	PS	SOC	Mar 12, 1952		France	
57 - Moselle	Jean-Pierre Masseret	PS	SOC	Aug 23, 1944	Allier (Cusset)	France	
57 - Moselle	François Grosdidier	UMP	UMP	Feb 25, 1961	Moselle (Metz)	France	
57 - Moselle	Philippe Leroy	UMP	UMP	Feb 3, 1940	Nord (Lille)	France	
57 - Moselle	Jean-Louis Masson	DVD	RASNAG	Mar 25, 1947	Moselle (Metz)	France	
58 - Nièvre	Anne Emery-Dumas	PS	SOC	Aug 30, 1959		France	
58 - Nièvre	Gaëtan Gorce	PS	SOC	Dec 2, 1958	Nièvre (Luzy)	France	
59 - Nord	Dominique Bailly	PS	SOC	Jan 2, 1960	Pas-de-Calais (Lens)	France	
59 - Nord	Delphine Bataille	PS	SOC	Sep 16, 1969		France	
59 - Nord	Michel Delebarre	PS	SOC	Apr 27, 1946	Nord (Bailleul)	France	
59 - Nord	René Vandierendonck	PS	SOC	Apr 1, 1951	Nord (Lille)	France	
59 - Nord	Marie-Christine Blandin	EELV	ECOLO	Sep 22, 1952	Nord (Roubaix)	France	
59 - Nord	Jean-René Lecerf	UMP	UMP	Apr 10, 1951	Nord (Valenciennes)	France	
59 - Nord	Jacques Legendre	UMP	UMP	Dec 2, 1941	Paris	France	
59 - Nord	Valérie Létard	UDI	UDI-UC	Oct 13, 1962	Nord (Orchies)	France	
59 - Nord	Alex Türk	DVD	RASNAG	Jan 25, 1950	Nord (Roubaix)	France	
59 - Nord	Éric Bocquet	PCF	CRC	Nov 8, 1957		France	
59 - Nord	Michelle Demessine	PCF	CRC	Jun 18, 1947	Nord (Frelinghien)	France	
60 - Oise	Yves Rome	PS	SOC	Apr 25, 1950	Lozère (Marvejols)	France	
60 - Oise	Jean-Pierre Bosino	PCF	CRC	Jan 15, 1959	Paris	France	
60 - Oise	Caroline Cayeux	UMP	UMP	Nov 1, 1948	Paris	France	
60 - Oise	Philippe Marini	UMP	UMP	Jan 28, 1950	Paris	France	
61 - Orne	Nathalie Goulet	UDI	UDI-UC	May 24, 1958	Hauts-de-Seine (Boulogne-Billancourt)	France	
61 - Orne	Jean-Claude Lenoir	UMP	UMP	Dec 27, 1944	Orne (Mortagne-au-Perche)	France	
62 - Pas-de-Calais	Catherine Génisson	PS	SOC	Apr 22, 1949	Paris	France	
62 - Pas-de-Calais	Jean-Claude Leroy	PS	SOC	Jun 3, 1952	Pas-de-Calais (Wavrans-sur-l'Aa)	France	
62 - Pas-de-Calais	Daniel Percheron	PS	SOC	Aug 31, 1942	Oise (Beauvais)	France	
62 - Pas-de-Calais	Hervé Poher	DVG	SOC	May 19, 1952	Pas-de-Calais (Calais)	France	
62 - Pas-de-Calais	Jean-Marie Vanlerenberghe	UDI	UDI-UC	Mar 29, 1939	Pas-de-Calais (Bully-les-Mines)	France	
62 - Pas-de-Calais	Natacha Bouchart	UMP	UMP	May 29, 1963	Pas-de-Calais (Lens)	France	
62 - Pas-de-Calais	Dominique Watrin	PCF	CRC	Jun 14, 1953		France	
63 - Puy-de-Dôme	Michèle André	PS	SOC	Feb 6, 1947	Puy-de-Dôme (Saint-Jacques-d'Ambur)	France	
63 - Puy-de-Dôme	Jacques-Bernard Magner	PS	SOC	Jun 1, 1952	Puy-de-Dôme (Riom)	France	
63 - Puy-de-Dôme	Alain Néri	PS	SOC	May 1, 1942	Puy-de-Dôme (Clermont-Ferrand)	France	
64 - Pyrénées-Atlantiques	Frédérique Espagnac	PS	SOC	Apr 19, 1972	Hautes-Pyrénées (Tarbes)	France	
64 - Pyrénées-Atlantiques	Georges Labazée	PS	SOC	Jun 16, 1943	Pyrénées-Atlantiques (Viven)	France	
64 - Pyrénées-Atlantiques	Jean-Jacques Lasserre	MoDem	UDI-UC	Mar 11, 1944	Pyrénées-Atlantiques (Bidache)	France	
65 - Hautes-Pyrénées	François Fortassin	PRG	RDSE	Aug 2, 1939		France	
65 - Hautes-Pyrénées	Josette Durrieu	PS	SOC	Mar 20, 1937	Hautes-Pyrénées (Mazères-de-Neste)	France	
66 - Pyrénées-Orientales	Hermeline Malherbe-Laurent	PS	RDSE	Feb 18, 1969	Pas-de-Calais (Carvin)	France	
66 - Pyrénées-Orientales	François Calvet	UMP	UMP	Apr 1, 1953	Pyrénées-Orientales (Perpignan)	France	
67 - Bas-Rhin	Fabienne Keller	UMP	UMP	Oct 20, 1959	Bas-Rhin (Sélestat)	France	
67 - Bas-Rhin	Guy-Dominique Kennel	UMP	UMP	Apr 14, 1952	Bas-Rhin (Strasbourg)	France	
67 - Bas-Rhin	André Reichardt	UMP	UMP	Dec 5, 1949	Bas-Rhin (Wissembourg)	France	
67 - Bas-Rhin	Jacques Bigot	PS	SOC	Jul 31, 1952	Bas-Rhin (Strasbourg)	France	
67 - Bas-Rhin	Claude Kern	UDI	UDI-UC	Mar 13, 1959	Bas-Rhin (Bischwiller)	France	
68 - Haut-Rhin	Catherine Troendlé	UMP	UMP	Feb 20, 1961	Haut-Rhin (Mulhouse)	France	
68 - Haut-Rhin	René Danesi	UDI	UMP	Aug 30, 1947		France	
68 - Haut-Rhin	Jean-Marie Bockel	UDI	UDI-UC	Jun 22, 1950	Bas-Rhin (Strasbourg)	France	
68 - Haut-Rhin	Patricia Schillinger	PS	SOC	Jan 18, 1963	Bas-Rhin (Strasbourg)	France	
69 - Rhône	François-Noël Buffet	UMP	UMP	Aug 28, 1963		France	
69 - Rhône	Catherine Di Folco	UMP	UMP	Nov 30, 1960		France	
69 - Rhône	Michel Forissier	UMP	UMP	Sep 12, 1943	Rhône (Lyon)	France	
69 - Rhône	Élisabeth Lamure	UMP	UMP	Nov 20, 1947		France	
69 - Rhône	Gérard Collomb	PS	SOC	Jun 20, 1947	Saône-et-Loire (Chalon-sur-Saône)	France	
69 - Rhône	Annie Guillemot	PS	SOC	Jan 27, 1956	Rhône (Lyon)	France	
69 - Rhône	Michel Mercier	UDI	UDI-UC	Mar 7, 1947	Rhône (Bourg-de-Thizy)	France	
70 - Haute-Saône	Alain Joyandet	UMP	UMP	Jan 15, 1954	Côte-d'Or (Dijon)	France	
70 - Haute-Saône	Michel Raison	UMP	UMP	Nov 5, 1949	Doubs (Besançon)	France	
71 - Saône-et-Loire	Jean-Patrick Courtois	UMP	UMP	May 20, 1951	Rhône (Lyon)	France	
71 - Saône-et-Loire	Jean-Paul Emorine	UMP	UMP	Mar 20, 1944	Saône-et-Loire (Sennecey-le-Grand)	France	
71 - Saône-et-Loire	Jérôme Durain	PS	SOC	Jun 2, 1969		France	
72 - Sarthe	Jean-Claude Boulard	PS	SOC	Mar 28, 1943	Loire-Atlantique (Nantes)	France	
72 - Sarthe	Louis-Jean de Nicolaÿ	UMP	UMP	Sep 18, 1949	Sarthe (Le Mans)	France	
72 - Sarthe	Jean-Pierre Vogel	UMP	UMP	Aug 7, 1956		France	
73 - Savoie	Michel Bouvard	UMP	UMP	Mar 17, 1955	Val-d'Oise (Argenteuil)	France	
73 - Savoie	Jean-Pierre Vial	UMP	UMP	Feb 17, 1951	Savoie (Chambéry)	France	
74 - Haute-Savoie	Jean-Claude Carle	UMP	UMP	Jun 9, 1948	Savoie (Chambéry)	France	
74 - Haute-Savoie	Cyril Pellevat	UMP	UMP	Feb 18, 1981	Haute-Savoie (Annemasse)	France	
74 - Haute-Savoie	Loïc Hervé	UDI	UDI-UC	Jun 8, 1980	Rhône (Vénissieux)	France	
75 - Paris	David Assouline	PS	SOC	Jun 16, 1959	Sefrou	Morocco	
75 - Paris	Jean-Pierre Caffet	PS	SOC	Nov 8, 1951	Algiers	Algeria	
75 - Paris	Bariza Khiari	PS	SOC	Sep 3, 1946	Ksar Sbahi	Algeria	
75 - Paris	Marie-Noëlle Lienemann	PS	SOC	Jul 12, 1951	Territoire de Belfort (Belfort)	France	
75 - Paris	Roger Madec	PS	SOC	Oct 27, 1950	Paris	France	
75 - Paris	Leila Aïchi	EELV	ECOLO	May 14, 1970	Val-d'Oise (Beaumont-sur-Oise)	France	
75 - Paris	Jean Desessard	EELV	ECOLO	Sep 6, 1952		France	
75 - Paris	Pierre Laurent	PCF	CRC	Jul 1, 1957	Paris	France	
75 - Paris	Chantal Jouanno	UDI	UDI-UC	Jul 12, 1969	Eure (Vernon)	France	
75 - Paris	Yves Pozzo di Borgo	UDI	UDI-UC	May 3, 1948	Corse-du-Sud (Ajaccio)	France	
75 - Paris	Pierre Charon	UMP	UMP	Mar 1, 1951	Paris	France	
75 - Paris	Philippe Dominati	UMP	UMP	Apr 12, 1954		France	
76 - Seine-Maritime	Catherine Morin-Desailly	UDI	UDI-UC	Jul 6, 1960	Seine-Maritime (Le Petit-Quevilly)	France	
76 - Seine-Maritime	Agnès Canayer	UMP	UMP	Sep 21, 1965		France	
76 - Seine-Maritime	Charles Revet	UMP	UMP	Nov 9, 1937	Seine-Maritime (Turretot)	France	
76 - Seine-Maritime	Didier Marie	PS	SOC	May 19, 1960	Seine-Maritime (Le Petit-Quevilly)	France	
76 - Seine-Maritime	Nelly Tocqueville	PS	SOC	May 2, 1950		France	
76 - Seine-Maritime	Thierry Foucaud	PCF	CRC	Jan 18, 1954	Seine-Maritime (Mont-Saint-Aignan)	France	
77 - Seine-et-Marne	Nicole Bricq	PS	SOC	Jun 10, 1947	Charente (La Rochefoucauld)	France	
77 - Seine-et-Marne	Vincent Eblé	PS	SOC	Oct 15, 1957	Moselle (Metz)	France	
77 - Seine-et-Marne	Michel Billout	PCF	CRC	Feb 19, 1958		France	
77 - Seine-et-Marne	Michel Houel	UMP	UMP	Nov 8, 1942	Seine-et-Marne (Condé-Sainte-Libiaire)	France	
77 - Seine-et-Marne	Jean-Jacques Hyest	UMP	UMP	Mar 2, 1943		France	
77 - Seine-et-Marne	Colette Mélot	UMP	UMP	Apr 20, 1947		France	
78 - Yvelines	Alain Gournac	UMP	UMP	Sep 13, 1943	Yvelines (L'Étang-la-Ville)	France	
78 - Yvelines	Gérard Larcher	UMP	UMP	Sep 14, 1949	Orne (Flers)	France	
78 - Yvelines	Sophie Primas	UMP	UMP	Jun 7, 1962		France	
78 - Yvelines	Marie-Annick Duchêne	DVD	UMP	Aug 23, 1940		France	
78 - Yvelines	Catherine Tasca	PS	SOC	Dec 13, 1941	Rhône (Lyon)	France	
78 - Yvelines	Philippe Esnol	PRG	RDSE	Apr 2, 1954		France	
79 - Deux-Sèvres	Jean-Marie Morisset	UMP	UMP	Aug 18, 1947	Deux-Sèvres (Parthenay)	France	
79 - Deux-Sèvres	Philippe Mouiller	UMP	UMP	Sep 20, 1969		France	
80 - Somme	Daniel Dubois	UDI	UDI-UC	Feb 5, 1952	Somme (Oneux)	France	
80 - Somme	Jérôme Bignon	UMP	UMP	Jan 1, 1949	Hauts-de-Seine (Neuilly-sur-Seine)	France	
80 - Somme	Christian Manable	PS	SOC	Oct 26, 1947	Somme (Verpillières)	France	
81 - Tarn	Philippe Bonnecarrère	UDI	UDI-UC	Jul 12, 1955	Haute-Garonne (Toulouse)	France	
81 - Tarn	Thierry Carcenac	PS	SOC	Dec 19, 1950	Tarn (Lescure-d'Albigeois)	France	
82 - Tarn-et-Garonne	Yvon Collin	DVG	RDSE	Apr 10, 1944	Tarn-et-Garonne (Montauban)	France	
82 - Tarn-et-Garonne	François Bonhomme	DVD	UMP	May 5, 1969		France	
83 - Var	Christiane Hummel	UMP	UMP	May 8, 1942	Var (Toulon)	France	
83 - Var	Hubert Falco	UMP	UMP	May 15, 1947	Var (Pignans)	France	
83 - Var	Pierre-Yves Collombat	PS	RDSE	Jul 18, 1945		France	
83 - Var	David Rachline	FN	RASNAG	Dec 2, 1987	Var (Saint-Raphaël)	France	
84 - Vaucluse	Claude Haut	PS	SOC	Dec 22, 1944		France	
84 - Vaucluse	Geneviève Jean	PS	SOC	Aug 28, 1945		France	
84 - Vaucluse	Alain Milon	UMP	UMP	Sep 16, 1947		France	
85 - Vendée	Didier Mandelli	UMP	UMP	Aug 7, 1964		France	
85 - Vendée	Bruno Retailleau	UMP	UMP	Nov 20, 1960	Maine-et-Loire (Cholet)	France	
85 - Vendée	Annick Billon	UDI	UDI-UC	Aug 3, 1967		France	
86 - Vienne	Alain Fouché	UMP	UMP	Dec 4, 1942		France	
86 - Vienne	Jean-Pierre Raffarin	UMP	UMP	Aug 3, 1948	Vienne (Poitiers)	France	
87 - Haute-Vienne	Marie-Françoise Pérol-Dumont	PS	SOC	May 26, 1952	Haute-Vienne (Nedde)	France	
87 - Haute-Vienne	Jean-Marc Gabouty	UDI	UDI-UC	May 17, 1949		France	
88 - Vosges	Daniel Gremillet	UMP	UMP	Jul 31, 1953	Vosges (Bruyères)	France	
88 - Vosges	Jackie Pierre	UMP	UMP	May 27, 1946	Vosges (La Chapelle-aux-Bois)	France	
89 - Yonne	Henri de Raincourt	UMP	UMP	Nov 17, 1948	Yonne (Saint-Valérien)	France	
89 - Yonne	Jean-Baptiste Lemoyne	UMP	UMP	Sep 15, 1977		France	
90 - Territoire de Belfort	Cédric Perrin	UMP	UMP	Jan 20, 1974	Territoire de Belfort (Belfort)	France	
91 - Essonne	Jean-Vincent Placé	EELV	ECOLO	Mar 12, 1968	Seoul	South Korea	
91 - Essonne	Claire-Lise Campion	PS	SOC	Jul 27, 1951	Tangier	Morocco	
91 - Essonne	Michel Berson	DVG	SOC	Apr 21, 1945	Val-d'Oise (Goussainville)	France	
91 - Essonne	Vincent Delahaye	UDI	UDI-UC	Aug 23, 1959	Val-d'Oise (L'Isle-Adam)	France	
91 - Essonne	Serge Dassault	UMP	UMP	Apr 4, 1925	Paris	France	
92 - Hauts-de-Seine	Philippe Kaltenbach	PS	SOC	Jan 9, 1966	Alpes-Maritimes (Le Cannet)	France	
92 - Hauts-de-Seine	Brigitte Gonthier-Maurin	PCF	CRC	Apr 23, 1956		France	
92 - Hauts-de-Seine	André Gattolin	EELV	ECOLO	Jun 24, 1960	Isère (Bourgoin-Jallieu)	France	
92 - Hauts-de-Seine	Isabelle Debré	UMP	UMP	May 23, 1957	Calvados (Lisieux)	France	
92 - Hauts-de-Seine	Jacques Gautier	UMP	UMP	Sep 18, 1946	Bouches-du-Rhône (Aix-en-Provence)	France	
92 - Hauts-de-Seine	Roger Karoutchi	UMP	UMP	Aug 26, 1951	Casablanca	Morocco	
92 - Hauts-de-Seine	Hervé Marseille	UDI	UDI-UC	Aug 20, 1954	Somme (Abbeville)	France	
93 - Seine-Saint-Denis	Claude Dilain	PS	SOC	Aug 12, 1948	Seine-Saint-Denis (Saint-Denis)	France	
93 - Seine-Saint-Denis	Gilbert Roger	PS	SOC	Nov 9, 1953	Seine-Saint-Denis (Bondy)	France	
93 - Seine-Saint-Denis	Aline Archimbaud	EELV	ECOLO	Nov 2, 1948	Territoire de Belfort (Belfort)	France	
93 - Seine-Saint-Denis	Éliane Assassi	PCF	CRC	Oct 2, 1958		France	
93 - Seine-Saint-Denis	Philippe Dallier	UMP	UMP	Dec 8, 1962	Hauts-de-Seine (Levallois-Perret)	France	
93 - Seine-Saint-Denis	Vincent Capo-Canellas	UDI	UDI-UC	May 4, 1967	Gard (Nîmes)	France	
94 - Val-de-Marne	Luc Carvounas	PS	SOC	Jun 8, 1971	Val-de-Marne (Charenton-le-Pont)	France	
94 - Val-de-Marne	Laurence Cohen	PCF	CRC	Jan 15, 1953		France	
94 - Val-de-Marne	Christian Favier	PCF	CRC	Feb 20, 1951	Val-de-Marne (Saint-Maur-des-Fossés)	France	
94 - Val-de-Marne	Esther Benbassa	EELV	ECOLO	Mar 27, 1950	Istanbul	Turkey	
94 - Val-de-Marne	Christian Cambon	UMP	UMP	Mar 8, 1948		France	
94 - Val-de-Marne	Catherine Procaccia	UMP	UMP	Oct 13, 1949	Paris	France	
95 - Val-d'Oise	Dominique Gillot	PS	SOC	Jul 11, 1949	Yvelines (Conflans-Sainte-Honorine)	France	
95 - Val-d'Oise	Alain Richard	PS	SOC	Aug 29, 1945	Paris	France	
95 - Val-d'Oise	Robert Hue	MUP	RDSE	Oct 19, 1946	Val-d'Oise (Cormeilles-en-Parisis)	France	
95 - Val-d'Oise	Francis Delattre	UMP	UMP	Sep 11, 1946	Somme (Naours)	France	
95 - Val-d'Oise	Hugues Portelli	UMP	UMP	Sep 22, 1947	Constantine	Algeria	
971 - Guadeloupe	Jacques Gillot	GUSR	SOC	Mar 4, 1948	Guadeloupe (Le Gosier)	France	
971 - Guadeloupe	Jacques Cornano	DVG	SOC	Nov 18, 1956		France	
971 - Guadeloupe	Félix Desplan	PS	SOC	Feb 22, 1943		France	
972 - Martinique	Maurice Antiste	PS	SOC	Jun 22, 1953	Martinique (Le François)	France	
972 - Martinique	Serge Larcher	PPM	SOC	Oct 17, 1945	Martinique (Le Diamant)	France	
973 - French Guiana	Antoine Karam	PSG	SOC	Feb 21, 1950	French Guiana (Cayenne)	France	
973 - French Guiana	Georges Patient	DVG	SOC	Apr 1, 1949	French Guiana (Cayenne)	France	
974 - Réunion	Michel Fontaine	UMP	UMP	May 6, 1952	Drôme (Romans-sur-Isère)	France	
974 - Réunion	Didier Robert	UMP	UMP	Apr 26, 1964	Réunion (Saint-Pierre)	France	
974 - Réunion	Paul Vergès	PCR	CRC	Mar 5, 1925	Ubon Ratchathani	Thailand	
974 - Réunion	Michel Vergoz	PS	SOC	Jan 10, 1950		France	
975 - Saint Pierre and Miquelon	Karine Claireaux	PS	SOC	Nov 15, 1963		France	
976 - Mayotte	Thani Mohamed Soilihi	DVG	SOC	Jun 20, 1972		France	
976 - Mayotte	Abdourahamane Soilihi	UMP	UMP	Oct 4, 1959		France	
977 - Saint-Barthélemy	Michel Magras	UMP	UMP	Jan 6, 1954		France	
978 - Saint-Martin	Guillaume Arnell	DVG	RDSE	Jan 20, 1958		France	
986 - Wallis and Futuna	Robert Laufoaulu	UMP	UMP	Jul 7, 1947		France	
987 - French Polynesia	Vincent Dubois	TH	UDI-UC	Aug 5, 1981		France	
987 - French Polynesia	Teura Iriti	TH	UDI-UC	Jan 7, 1965	French Polynesia (Papeete)	France	
988 - New Caledonia	Pierre Frogier	RUMP	UMP	Nov 16, 1950	New Caledonia (Nouméa)	France	
988 - New Caledonia	Hilarion Vendégou	RUMP	UMP	Sep 4, 1941	New Caledonia (Isle of Pines)	France	
999 - French residents overseas	Jean-Pierre Cantegrit	UMP	UMP	Jul 2, 1933	Charente-Maritime (Rouffiac)	France	
999 - French residents overseas	Robert del Picchia	UMP	UMP	Nov 10, 1942	Bouches-du-Rhône (Marseille)	France	
999 - French residents overseas	Jacky Deromedi	UMP	UMP	Jun 15, 1944	Haute-Garonne (Toulouse)	France	
999 - French residents overseas	Louis Duvernois	UMP	UMP	May 17, 1941	Saône-et-Loire (Le Creusot)	France	
999 - French residents overseas	Christophe-André Frassa	UMP	UMP	Feb 4, 1968	Monaco	Monaco	
999 - French residents overseas	Joëlle Garriaud-Maylam	UMP	UMP	Mar 20, 1955	Maghnia	Algeria	
999 - French residents overseas	Christiane Kammermann	UMP	UMP	Jul 10, 1932	Hauts-de-Seine (Boulogne-Billancourt)	France	
999 - French residents overseas	Olivier Cadic	UDI	UDI-UC	Apr 22, 1962		France	
999 - French residents overseas	Hélène Conway-Mouret	PS	SOC	Sep 13, 1960	Annaba	Algeria	
999 - French residents overseas	Jean-Yves Leconte	PS	SOC	Oct 31, 1966	Paris	France	
999 - French residents overseas	Claudine Lepage	PS	SOC	Aug 10, 1949	Paris	France	
999 - French residents overseas	Richard Yung	PS	SOC	Sep 22, 1947	Indre-et-Loire (Amboise)	France	

== See also ==
- Senate of France
