= Senate Republicans (France) =

Senate parliamentary group in France

Senate Republicans Groupe Les Républicains
- Chamber: Senate
- Foundation: 10 December 2002
- Previous name(s): Union for a Popular Movement group (2002–2015); Groupe Union pour un mouvement populaire
- Member parties: The Republicans
- President: Mathieu Darnaud
- Representation: 124 / 348
- Ideology: Liberal conservatism
- Political position: Centre-right
- Website: www.lesrepublicains-senat.fr

The Senate Republicans (formally The Republicans group; French: Groupe Les Républicains, also Les Républicains du Sénat), formerly the Union for a Popular Movement group (Groupe Union pour un mouvement populaire), is a parliamentary group in the French Senate including representatives of The Republicans (LR), formerly the Union for a Popular Movement (UMP). It is currently the largest group in the Senate. Its president has been Mathieu Darnaud since 2024.

== History ==
The Union for a Popular Movement group (groupe Union pour un mouvement populaire) in the Senate was officially formed on 10 December 2002 after the foundation of the Union for a Popular Movement earlier that year; at the time of its creation, it included 167 members, an absolute majority, with Josselin de Rohan elected as its first president. The group united 93 out of 94 members of the Rally for the Republic (RPR) group, 40 out of 41 members of the Republicans and Independents (RI) group (associated with Liberal Democracy), 29 out of 54 members of the Centrist Union (UC) group, 4 out of 21 members of the European Democratic and Social Rally (RDSE) group, and 1 non-inscrit. The group maintained its absolute majority until the 2004 renewal.

On 15 January 2008, de Rohan stood down as president of the group to assume the role of president of the Foreign Affairs, Defense and Armed Forces Committee, and was succeeded the same day by the former member of the Radical Party Henri de Raincourt. De Raincourt subsequently stepped down on 6 July 2009, ahead of his appointment to the government, with Gérard Longuet elected unopposed as his successor on 7 July, his only opponent – Eric Doligé – having withdrawn his candidacy before the vote. On 7 March 2011, Longuet departed from the presidency of the group after his appointment as Minister of Defense within the government, with Jean-Claude Gaudin taking his place on 8 March uncontested; though Jean-Pierre Raffarin envisaged the possibility of presenting his candidature, he ultimately supported Gaudin for the post.

The UMP group lost its relative majority in the 2011 renewal, after which the left took control of the upper chamber for the first time in the history of the Fifth Republic. Though Gaudin remained in the Senate after the 2014 renewal, he did not wish to seek the presidency of the group, leaving it to an open contest instead. On 2 October, Bruno Retailleau, a supporter of François Fillon in the disputed 2012 leadership election, was elected president of the group with 79 votes against Sarkozyist Roger Karoutchi with 39 votes and Longuet with 25. On 2 June 2015, the group was renamed to The Republicans group (groupe Les Républicains) following the founding congress of the renamed party.

In the 2020 French Senate election the Republicans held their majority.

== List of presidents ==
Name	Image	Term start	Term end	Notes
Josselin de Rohan		10 December 2002	15 January 2008	
Henri de Raincourt		15 January 2008	6 July 2009	
Gérard Longuet		7 July 2009	7 March 2011	
Jean-Claude Gaudin		8 March 2011	6 October 2014	
Bruno Retailleau		7 October 2014	30 September 2024	

== Historical membership ==
Year	Leader	Seats	Change	Series	Notes
2004	Josselin de Rohan	156 / 331	Steady	C	
2008	Henri de Raincourt	151 / 343	▼5	A	
2011	Gérard Larcher	132 / 348	▼19	1	
2014	Jean-Claude Gaudin	143 / 348	▲11	2	
2017	Bruno Retailleau	146 / 348	▲3	1	
2020	Bruno Retailleau	148 / 348	▲2	2	
2023	Bruno Retailleau	139 / 348	▼7	1	

== Founding members ==
The UMP group was founded on 10 December 2002 with 167 members, including 93 out of 94 members of the Rally for the Republic (RPR) group, 40 out of 41 members of the Republicans and Independents (RI) group (associated with Liberal Democracy), 29 out of 54 members of the Centrist Union (UC) group, 4 out of 21 members of the European Democratic and Social Rally (RDSE) group, and 1 non-inscrit.

Name	Group
Nicolas About	RI
Jean-Paul Alduy	UC
Pierre André	RPR
Gérard Bailly	RPR
José Balarello	RI
Bernard Barraux**	UC
Jacques Baudot	UC
Michel Bécot	UC
Claude Belot	UC**
Christian Bergelin	RPR
Daniel Bernardet	UC
Roger Besse	RPR
Laurent Béteille	RPR
Joël Billard	RI
Jean Bizet	RPR
Jacques Blanc	RI
Paul Blanc	RPR
Joël Bourdin	RI
Brigitte Bout	RPR*
Jean-Guy Branger	UC
Gérard Braun*	RPR*
Dominique Braye	RPR*
Paulette Brisepierre	RPR
Louis de Broissia	RPR
Jean-Pierre Cantegrit	UC**
Jean-Claude Carle	RI
Auguste Cazalet	RPR
Charles Ceccaldi-Raynaud	RPR
Gérard César	RPR
Jacques Chaumont	RPR
Jean Chérioux	RPR
Marcel-Pierre Cléach	RI**
Jean Clouet	RI
Christian Cointat	RPR
Gérard Cornu	RPR
Jean-Patrick Courtois	RPR
Robert del Picchia**	RPR**
Christian Demuynck	RPR
Gérard Dériot**	UC
Éric Doligé	RPR
Jacques Dominati	RI
Michel Doublet	RPR
Paul Dubrule	RPR**
Alain Dufaut	RPR
André Dulait	UC
Ambroise Dupont	RI
Hubert Durand-Chastel**	RASNAG
Louis Duvernois**	RPR**
Daniel Eckenspieller	RPR*
Jean-Paul Emin	RI
Jean-Paul Emorine	RI
Michel Esneu	RPR
Jean-Claude Étienne	RPR
Jean Faure	UC
André Ferrand	RI
Hilaire Flandre	RPR
Gaston Flosse	RPR
Alain Fouché	RI
Jean-Pierre Fourcade	RDSE
Bernard Fournier	RPR
Serge Franchis	UC
Philippe François	RPR
Jean François-Poncet	RDSE
Yves Fréville**	UC
Yann Gaillard	RPR*
René Garrec	RI
Jean-Claude Gaudin	RI
Philippe de Gaulle	RPR
Patrice Gélard	RPR
André Geoffroy	RI
Alain Gérard	RPR
François Gerbaud	RPR
Charles Ginésy	RPR
Francis Giraud	RPR
Paul Girod	RDSE
Daniel Goulet	RPR
Alain Gournac	RPR
Adrien Gouteyron	RPR
Francis Grignon	UC
Louis Grillot	RI
Georges Gruillot	RPR
Charles Guené	RPR
Michel Guerry	RPR
Hubert Haenel	RPR
Emmanuel Hamel	RPR
Françoise Henneron	RI
Pierre Hérisson	UC
Daniel Hoeffel	UC
Jean-François Humbert	RI
Jean-Jacques Hyest	UC
Pierre Jarlier	UC
Jean-Marc Juilhard	RI
Roger Karoutchi	RPR
Jean-Philippe Lachenaud	RI
Christian de La Malène**	RPR
Lucien Lanier	RPR
Jacques Larché	RI
Gérard Larcher	RPR
André Lardeux	RPR
Patrick Lassourd	RPR
Robert Laufoaulu**	RPR**
René-Georges Laurin	RPR
Jean-René Lecerf	RPR
Dominique Leclerc	RPR
Jacques Legendre	RPR
Jean-François Le Grand	RPR
Serge Lepeltier	RPR
Philippe Leroy	RPR
Marcel Lesbros	UC
Gérard Longuet	RI
Jean-Louis Lorrain	UC
Simon Loueckhote	RPR
Roland du Luart	RI
Brigitte Luypaert	UC
Max Marest	RPR
Philippe Marini	RPR
Pierre Martin	RPR
Jean-Louis Masson	RPR
Serge Mathieu	RI
Lucette Michaux-Chevry	RPR
Jean-Luc Miraux	RPR
René Monory	UC
Dominique Mortemousque	UC
Georges Mouly*	RDSE
Bernard Murat	RPR
Philippe Nachbar	RI
Paul Natali	RPR
Nelly Olin	RPR
Joseph Ostermann	RPR
Jacques Oudin	RPR
Monique Papon	UC
Michel Pelchat	RI
Jean Pépin (fr)	RI
Jacques Peyrat	RPR
Xavier Pintat	RI
Bernard Plasait	RI
Jean-Marie Poirier	UC
Christian Poncelet	RPR
Ladislas Poniatowski	RI
André Pourny**	RI**
Jean Puech	RI
Henri de Raincourt	RI
Victor Reux	RPR
Charles Revet	RI
Henri Revol	RI
Henri de Richemont	RPR
Philippe Richert	UC
Yves Rispat	RPR*
Josselin de Rohan	RPR
Roger Romani	RPR
Janine Rozier	RPR**
Bernard Saugey	RI
Jean-Pierre Schosteck	RPR
Bruno Sido	RPR
Louis Souvet	RPR
Michel Thiollière	UC
Henri Torre	RI
René Trégouët	RPR
André Trillard	RPR
François Trucy	RI
Maurice Ulrich	RPR
Jacques Valade	RPR
Alain Vasselle	RPR
Jean-Pierre Vial	RPR
Xavier de Villepin	UC
Serge Vinçon	RPR
Jean-Paul Virapoullé	UC
* Associated member ** Administratively attached member

== See also ==
- The Republicans group (National Assembly)
