= List of senators of French citizens living abroad =

Following is a list of senators for French citizens living abroad, who have represented French residents in foreign states in the Senate, the upper house of the French Parliament, since the end of World War II. French citizens living abroad also enjoy representation in the lower house, the National Assembly, through eleven designated constituencies. Currently, there are twelve senators for French citizens living abroad, six elected every three years.

== Fourth Republic ==
During the French Fourth Republic the 27 October 1946 constitution defined a "Council of the Republic", the name used for the Senate until 1958. Three seats were reserved for "Councilors of the Republic" (senators) representing the Français de l'extérieur (French from outside) living in Europe, the Americas and Asia-Oceania. Special provisions applied to Africa, in which the colonies and protectorates also had elected representatives. Elections were indirect, through an electoral college composed of representatives of expatriate organizations. Senators of French citizens living abroad during the French Fourth Republic were:

Region	Name	In office	Notes
Morocco	Marcel Gatuing	1946–1955	
Morocco	Jean Leonetti	1946–1959	
Morocco	Jean Jullien	1946–1948	
Morocco	Louis Gros	1948–1959	
Morocco	Antoine Béthouart	1955–1959	
Indochina	Antoine Avinin	1948–1952	
Indochina	Léon Motais de Narbonne	1952–1959	
Tunisia	Louis Brunet	1947–1952	
Tunisia	Antoine Colonna	1947–1959	
Tunisia	Gabriel Puaux	1952–1959	
Other (l'étranger)	André Armengaud	1945–1959	
Other (l'étranger)	Marcel Baron	1947–1948	
Other (l'étranger)	Henri Longchambon	1947–1959	
Other (l'étranger)	Marius Viple	1947–1949	Died in office
Other (l'étranger)	Ernest Pezet	1948–1959	

== Fifth Republic ==
During the French Fifth Republic the 28 September 1958 constitution and subsequent ordinances increased the number of senators to six, with two representing Europe and the Americas, one for Asia-Oceania, and three for Africa. Africa was over-represented compared to Europe and America in this arrangement. The 84-member Conseil supérieur des Français de l'étranger (CSFE) served as the electoral college. The first major reform of the CSFE was with the law of 7 June 1982, under which voting members of the CSFE would be directly elected, and these members would in turn elect 12 senators for nine-year terms. The seats were divided into series A, B and C, with elections for one of the series held every three years.

=== 1959–2004: 9-year terms ===
Senators of French citizens living abroad (Français Établis Hors De France) during the French Fifth Republic were:

Se	Term	Name	Group	Notes
A	1959–1962	Henri Longchambon	Gauche Démocratique	
A	1959–1962	Antoine Béthouart	Union Centriste des Démocrates de Progrès	
B	1959–1965	Louis Gros	Républicains et Indépendants	
B	1959–1965	Carrier Maurice	Union pour la Nouvelle République	
C	1959–1968	Léon Motais de Narbonne	Union Centriste des Démocrates de Progrès	
C	1959–1968	André Armengaud	Républicains et Indépendants	
A	1962–1971	Antoine Béthouart	Union Centriste des Démocrates de Progrès	
A	1962–1969	Henri Longchambon	Gauche Démocratique	Died in office 20 March 1969
A	1969–1971	Jacques Habert	not aligned	From 21 March 1969 in place of Henri Longchambon
B	1965–1974	Carrier Maurice	Union pour la Nouvelle République	
B	1965–1974	Louis Gros	Républicains et Indépendants	
C	1968–1974	André Armengaud	Républicains et Indépendants	Died in office 11 March 1974
C	1974–1977	Edmond Sauvageot	Républicains et Indépendants	From 12 March 1974 in place of André Armengaud
C	1968–1971	Léon Motais de Narbonne	Union Centriste des Démocrates de Progrès	Died in office 10 August 1971
C	1971–1974	Jacques Rosselli	Union des Démocrates pour la République	From 11 August 1971 in place of Léon Motais de Narbonne; Died in office 4 February 1974
A	1971–1980	Pierre Croze	Républicains et Indépendants	
A	1971–1980	Jacques Habert	not aligned	
B	1974–1983	Charles De Cuttoli	Rassemblement pour la République	
B	1974–1977	Louis Gros	Républicains et Indépendants	Until 4 March 1977 (named to Constitutional Council)
B	1974–1977	Paul d'Ornano	Rassemblement pour la République	
B	1977–1983	Jean-Pierre Cantegrit	Les Républicains	From 4 March 1977 in place of Louis Gros
C	1977–1986	Paul d'Ornano	Rassemblement pour la République	
C	1977–1986	Frédéric Wirth	Union Centriste	
A	1980–1989	Pierre Croze	Républicains et Indépendants	
A	1980–1989	Jacques Habert	not aligned	
C	1986–1990	Jean Barras	Rassemblement pour la République	Died in office 11 April 1990
C	1990–1995	Hubert Durand-Chastel	Union pour un Mouvement Populaire	From 12 April 1990 in place of Jean Barras
A	1989–1998	Pierre Biarnès	Communiste républicain citoyen et écologiste	
A	1989–1998	Paulette Brisepierre	Union pour un Mouvement Populaire	
A	1998–2008	Pierre Biarnès	Communiste républicain citoyen et écologiste	
A	1998–2008	Paulette Brisepierre	Union pour un Mouvement Populaire	
A	1989–1998	Pierre Croze	Républicains et Indépendants	Died in office 19 January 1998
A	1998	André Gaspard	Républicains et Indépendants	From 20 January 1998 in place of Pierre Croze
A	1998–2008	André Ferrand	Union pour un Mouvement Populaire	
A	1989–1998	Jacques Habert	not aligned	
B	1983–1992	Jean-Pierre Bayle	Socialiste	
B	1983–1992	Olivier Rioux	Union Centriste	
B	1983–1992	Charles De Cuttoli	Rassemblement pour la République	
B	1983–1992	Jean-Pierre Cantegrit	Les Républicains	
C	1986–1995	Xavier de Villepin	Union pour un Mouvement Populaire	
C	1986–1995	Paul d'Ornano	Rassemblement pour la République	
C	1986–1995	Guy Penne	Socialiste	
B	1992–2001	Jean-Pierre Cantegrit	Les Républicains	
B	1992–2001	André Maman	Union Centriste	
B	1992–2001	Monique Cerisier-ben Guiga	Socialiste	
B	1992–2001	Charles De Cuttoli	Rassemblement pour la République	
C	1995–2004	Xavier de Villepin	Union pour un Mouvement Populaire	
C	1995–2004	Hubert Durand-Chastel	Union pour un Mouvement Populaire	
C	1995–2004	Guy Penne	Socialiste	
C	1995–2001	Paul d'Ornano	Rassemblement pour la République	Until 10 October 2001 (resigned)
C	2001-2001	Christian Cointat	Union pour un Mouvement Populaire	From 10 October 2001 in place of Paul d'Ornano
A	1998–2008	Robert del Picchia	Les Républicains	
B	2001–2011	Jean-Pierre Cantegrit	Les Républicains	
B	2001–2011	Monique Cerisier-ben Guiga	Socialiste	
B	2001–2011	Louis Duvernois	Les Républicains	
B	2001–2011	Michel Guerry	Union pour un Mouvement Populaire	

=== 2004–2010: transition from 9- to 6-year terms ===
In July 2003 the term was reduced to six years and the series changed to Series 1 and 2, with a transitional period until 2010. Senators of French citizens living abroad (Français Établis Hors De France) elected during the transition were:

Se	Term	Name	Group	Notes
C1	2004–2011	Christiane Kammermann	Les Républicains	
C2	2004–2014	Christian Cointat	Union pour un Mouvement Populaire	
C2	2004–2014	Richard Yung	La République En Marche	
C1	2004–2011	Joëlle Garriaud-Maylam	Les Républicains	
A	2008–2014	André Ferrand	Union pour un Mouvement Populaire	
A	2008–2014	Robert del Picchia	Les Républicains	
A	2008–2014	Claudine Lepage	Socialiste et républicain	
A	2008–2014	Christophe-André Frassa	Les Républicains	

=== 2010–present: 6-year terms ===
Senators of French citizens living abroad (Français Établis Hors De France) elected after the transition were:

Se	Term	Name	Group	Notes
1	2011–2017	Jean-Pierre Cantegrit	Les Républicains	
1	2011–2017	Louis Duvernois	Les Républicains	
1	2011–2017	Joëlle Garriaud-Maylam	Les Républicains	
1	2011–2017	Christiane Kammermann	Les Républicains	
1	2011–2017	Jean-Yves Leconte	Socialiste et républicain	
1	2011–2017	Louis Duvernois	Les Républicains	
1	2011–2017	Jean-Pierre Cantegrit	Les Républicains	
1	2011–2012	Hélène Conway-Mouret	Socialiste et républicain	Until 21 July 2012 (named to cabinet)
1	2012–2014	Kalliopi Ango Ela	Écologiste	From 22 July 2012 in place of Hélène Conway-Mouret; Until 2 May 2014 on return of Hélène Conway-Mouret
1	2014–2017	Hélène Conway-Mouret	Socialiste et républicain	From 3 May 2014 (returned from cabinet)
2	2014–present	Olivier Cadic	Union Centriste	
2	2014–present	Robert del Picchia	Les Républicains	
2	2014–2020	Jacky Deromedi	Les Républicains	
2	2014–present	Christophe-André Frassa	Les Républicains	
2	2014–2020	Claudine Lepage	Socialiste et républicain	
2	2014–2020	Richard Yung	La République En Marche	
1	2017–present	Hélène Conway-Mouret	Socialiste et républicain	
1	2017–present	Joëlle Garriaud-Maylam	Les Républicains	
1	2017–present	Jean-Yves Leconte	Socialiste et républicain	
1	2017–present	Ronan Le Gleut	Les Républicains	
1	2017–present	Évelyne Renaud-Garabedian	Les Républicains	
1	2017–present	Jean-Pierre Bansard	Les Républicains	
2	2020–present	Samantha Cazebonne	La République En Marche!	
2	2020–present	Yan Chantrel	SER	
2	2020–present	Mélanie Vogel	EST	

== Sources ==
- La Representation des Français Etablis Hors de France (in French), Sénat
- Liste des anciens sénateurs de la IVème République par circonscription (in French), Sénat de France
- Liste des anciens sénateurs de la Vème République par circonscription (in French), Sénat de France
- Liste par département (in French), Sénat de France
