= List of senators of Yvelines =

Location of Yvelines in France

Yvelines in western Seine-et-Oise

Following is a list of senators of Yvelines, people who have represented the department of Yvelines in the Senate of France. The department was created in 1978 as part of a reorganization of the former departments of Seine and Seine-et-Oise.

== Fifth Republic ==
Senators for Yvelines under the French Fifth Republic were:

Period	Name	Party or group	Notes
1968–1977	Aimé Bergeal	Groupe socialiste	Died in office
1968–1977	Brigitte Gros	Socialist Party (PS)	From 27 September 1973, replacing Aimé Bergeal
1968–1977	Édouard Bonnefous	Democratic and Socialist Union of the Resistance (UDSR)	
1968–1977	André Mignot	Independent Republicans (RI)	
1968–1977	Jacques Soufflet	Union for the New Republic (UNR)	Named to cabinet
1968–1977	Jean Bac	Union of Democrats for the Republic (UDR)	From 29 June 1974, replacing Jacques Soufflet
1977–1986	Jean Béranger	Radical Party of the Left (PRG)	
1977–1986	Édouard Bonnefous	Union of Democrats for the Republic (UDR)	
1977–1986	Brigitte Gros	Socialist Party (PS)	Died 11 March 1985
1977–1986	Jacques Toutain	Groupe de la Gauche Démocratique	From 12 March 1985, replacing Brigitte Gros, died 1 September 1985
1977–1986	Louis de Catuélan	Union for French Democracy (UDF)	From 2 September 1985, replacing Jacques Toutain
1977–1986	Bernard Hugo	French Communist Party (PCF)	
1977–1986	Philippe Machefer	Socialist Party (PS)	died
1977–1986	René Martin	French Communist Party (PCF)	From 16 August 1982, replacing Philippe Machefer
1986–1995	Jacques Bellanger	Socialist Party (PS)	
1986–1995	Louis de Catuélan	Union for French Democracy (UDF)	
1986–1995	Gérard Larcher	Rally for the Republic (RPR)	
1986–1995	Marc Lauriol	Rally for the Republic (RPR)	
1986–1995	Nelly Rodi	Rally for the Republic (RPR)	
1995–2004	Nicolas About	Union for French Democracy (UDF)	
1995–2004	Michel Rocard	Groupe socialiste	resigned 18 November 1997
1995–2004	Jacques Bellanger	Socialist Party (PS)	From 19 November 1997, replacing Michel Rocard
1995–2004	Dominique Braye	Union for a Popular Movement (UMP)	
1995–2004	Alain Gournac	Union for a Popular Movement (UMP)	
1995–2004	Alain Schmitz	Union for a Popular Movement (UMP)	From 1 May 2004, replacing Gérard Larcher, named to cabinet
2004–2011	Roselle Cros	Democratic Movement (MoDem)	From 23 January 2011, replacing Nicolas About, resigned
2004–2011	Dominique Braye	Union for a Popular Movement (UMP)	
2004–2011	Bernadette Dupont	Union for a Popular Movement (UMP)	
2004–2011	Alain Gournac	Union for a Popular Movement (UMP)	
2004–2011	Adeline Gousseau	Groupe Union pour un Mouvement Populaire	resigned 30 September 2007
2004–2011	Gérard Larcher	Union for a Popular Movement (UMP)	From 1 October 2007, replacing Adeline Gousseau
2004–2011	Catherine Tasca	Socialist Party (PS)	
2011–2017	Marie-Annick Duchêne	Miscellaneous right (DVD)	
2011–2017	Philippe Esnol	Socialist Party (PS)	
2011–2017	Alain Gournac	Union for a Popular Movement (UMP)	
2011–2017	Gérard Larcher	Union for a Popular Movement (UMP)	
2011–2017	Sophie Primas	Union for a Popular Movement (UMP)	
2011–2017	Catherine Tasca	Socialist Party (PS)	
2017–2023	Gérard Larcher	The Republicans (LR)	
2017–2023	Sophie Primas	The Republicans (LR)	
2017–2023	Alain Schmitz	The Republicans (LR)	
2017–2023	Marta de Cidrac	The Republicans (LR)	
2017–2023	Michel Laugier	Miscellaneous right (DVD)	
2017–2023	Martin Lévrier	La République En Marche! (LREM)	

== Sources ==
- Liste des anciens sénateurs de la Vème République par circonscription (in French), Sénat de France
- Liste par département – Yvelines (in French), Sénat de France
