= Mathilde Ollivier (politician) =

French politician (born 1994)

Member of the Senate
- Incumbent
- Assumed office 2 October 2023
- Constituency: French citizens living abroad

Personal details
- Born: 9 June 1994 (age 31)
- Party: The Ecologists

Mathilde Ollivier (born 9 June 1994) is a French politician serving as a member of the Senate since 2023. Until 2023, she was a member of the Assembly of French Citizens Abroad and the conseil consulaire.
