= Évelyne Renaud-Garabedian =

French politician and businesswoman (born 1950)

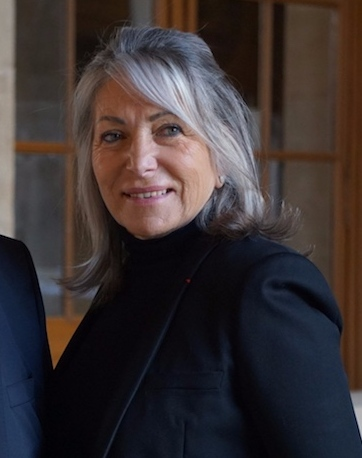

Senator for French citizens living abroad
- Incumbent
- Assumed office 1 October 2017

Personal details
- Born: 18 June 1950 (age 76) Créteil, France
- Party: Alliance solidaire des Français de l'étranger
- Occupation: Jurist; businesswoman; politician

Évelyne Renaud-Garabedian (French pronunciation: [evlin ʁəno ɡaʁabedjɑ̃]; born 18 June 1950) is a French politician, jurist and businesswoman who has served as a Senator for French citizens living abroad since 2017. She was elected as the second candidate on the Alliance solidaire des Français de l'étranger (ASFE) list led by Jean-Pierre Bansard in the 2017 election and re-elected in 2023 as its lead candidate. Renaud-Garabedian sits with the Senate Republicans.

== Honours ==
- Knight of the Legion of Honour (2010)
- Officer of the Ordre national du Mérite (2007)
