= De Villepin =

de Villepin is a surname. Notable people with the surname include:

- Dominique de Villepin (born 1953), French politician and Prime Minister of France
- Marie de Villepin (born 1986), French model, actress and singer, daughter of Dominique
- Xavier de Villepin (1926–2014), French politician
