= Nachbar =

Nachbar is a surname of German origin meaning "neighbour". Notable people with the surname include:

- Arian Nachbar, German speed skater
- Boštjan Nachbar, Slovenian basketball player
- Herbert Nachbar, East German writer
- Philippe Nachbar, French politician
