= Hélène Conway-Mouret =

French academic and politician

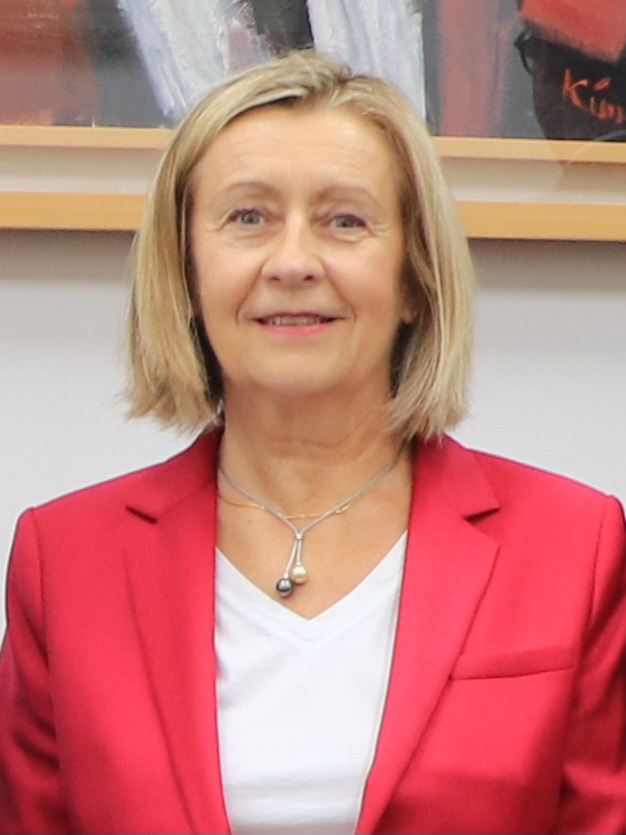
- Hélène Conway-Mouret in 2024

Vice-president of the Foreign Affairs, Defense and Armed Forces Committee of the Senate
- Incumbent
- Assumed office 2 October 2023

Vice-president of the Senate
- In office 6 November 2018 – 30 September 2020
- Preceded by: Marie-Noëlle Lienemann
- Succeeded by: Laurence Rossignol

Senator of French citizens living abroad
- In office 1 October 2011 – 21 July 2012
- Preceded by: Monique Cerisier-ben Guiga
- Succeeded by: Kalliopi Ango Ela
- Incumbent
- Assumed office 3 May 2014
- Preceded by: Kalliopi Ango Ela

Minister delegate of Foreign Affairs in charge of the French living abroad
- In office 2012–2014
- President: François Hollande
- Prime Minister: Jean-Marc Ayrault
- Preceded by: Yamina Benguigui
- Succeeded by: Fleur Pellerin

Personal details
- Born: 13 September 1960 (age 65) Bône, French Algeria
- Party: Socialist Party
- Education: Lumière University Lyon 2 Trinity College Dublin; Ulster University

Hélène Conway-Mouret (born 13 September 1960 in Bône, French Algeria) is a French academic and politician of the Socialist Party (PS) who has been serving as a member of the Senate between 2011 and 2012, and since 2014, representing the constituency of French citizens living abroad. She is Minister delegate for Foreign Affairs in charge of French citizens living abroad from 2012 to 2014 and Vice-President of the French Senate from 2018 to 2020. She is currently Vice-Chairwoman of the Senate's Foreign Affairs, Defense and Armed Forces Committee.

== Early life and education ==
Hélène Conway-Mouret was born on 13 September 1960 in Bône, French Algeria.

She graduated from the Lumière University Lyon 2 with a degree in modern literature. She received a Higher Diploma in Education (H.Dip.) and a Master of Philosophy from Trinity College Dublin. She also received a degree in Management Practice from the University of Ulster (now known as Ulster University).

== Early career ==
She lived in Ireland for 25 years, where she served as Chair of the Language Department at the Dublin Institute of Technology (DIT). She was also a visiting professor at the Pantheon-Sorbonne University. She was also a visiting professor at the Université Paris I Panthéon-Sorbonne.

She is perfectly bilingual.

== Political career ==
=== As Councillor for the French abroad ===
Elected to the Assembly of French Citizens Abroad (AFE) in 1997, re-elected in June 2000 and again in 2006, Hélène Conway-Mouret chaired the AFE's professional training commission from 2003 to 2006. From 2006 to 2011, she was vice-president of the ADFE group (Association démocratique des Français de l'étranger).

=== As Senator ===
She was elected senator for the French abroad in 2011 on the Socialist Party ticket, and has been a member of the Foreign Affairs, Defense and Armed Forces Committee ever since.

Her position as Minister Delegate for Foreign Affairs, which she held from 2012 to 2014, was abolished in the Valls government, and she returned to her mandate as senator on May 4, 2014. She was re-elected in 2017 for a second term2. Since then, she has been the rapporteur for program 146 on armed forces equipment.

In November 2018, she was elected vice-president of the high assembly, replacing Marie-Noëlle Lienemann who left the Socialist group, becoming the first representative of the French abroad to sit on the Senate bureau. Her term as vice-president ends in September 2020.

She was re-elected for a third term on 24 September 2023. Since that date, she has been Vice-Chairwoman of the Foreign Affairs, Defense and Armed Forces Committee, having served as Secretary during the previous term. She retains her role as rapporteur for program 146 on armed forces equipment.

=== As Minister delegate of Foreign Affairs ===
She was appointed Minister Delegate to the Minister of Foreign Affairs in charge of French nationals living abroad in the Jean-Marc Ayrault II government from 21 June 2012 to 31 March 2014.

As part of its remit, it has launched three major initiatives: the consular network, French education abroad and the representation of French nationals abroad.

She is behind the law n°2013-659 of 22 July 2013 relating to the representation of French nationals living outside France, which enables French nationals living abroad to be better represented. Indeed, this text creates consular councils, made up of councillors for French people living abroad, elected by direct universal suffrage by French people in the consular district. Placed in each embassy with a consular district (130) and in each consular post, a consular council is responsible for issuing opinions on consular issues or issues of general interest, particularly cultural, economic and social, concerning French nationals living in the district (social protection and social action, employment, vocational training and apprenticeships, French education abroad, security, health risks).

The law also extends the powers of the Assembly of French Citizens Abroad (AFE). It can now be consulted on the situation of French nationals living outside France and on any consular issue or matter of general interest concerning them, and can, on its own initiative, carry out studies and issue wishes, opinions and motions. With this law, the AFE is now made up of 90 members elected by the councillors of French people living abroad. It also stipulates that the twelve senators representing French nationals living outside France are elected by an electoral college now made up of the eleven deputies of French nationals living outside France, the 443 consular councillors and the 68 consular delegates.

== Main civic and community activities ==
Hélène Conway-Mouret joined the Socialist Party in 1997. She sits on the board of the party's French abroad federation, where she is responsible for cultural and educational affairs. A member of the Party of European Socialists (PES), she is also co-founder of the Dublin PES section.

From 1994 to 2011, she was President of the associative section Français du Monde-ADFE Ireland. She was also a member of the board of the Alliance française de Dublin from 2005 to 2012.

She was a French Foreign Trade Advisor from 2007 to 2011.

She was an auditor at the Institut des hautes études de la défense nationale (IHEDN) in 2009 and 2010, then a manager in 2011. In July 2012, Hélène Conway-Mouret was inducted into the citizens' reserve of the Association pour le développement de l'enseignement et de la recherche (ADER) network.

Hélène Conway-Mouret was appointed Deputy National Secretary of the Socialist Party in the summer of 2014, with responsibility for France's influence and influence around the world. On 4 July 2015, she was appointed deputy national secretary of the Socialist Party in charge of international affairs. On 15 April 2018, Hélène Conway-Mouret was appointed by the National Council of the Socialist Party as National Secretary in charge of protecting the French and the Nation. Since 24 November 2020, she has been National Secretary for the Defense of the Nation.

In October 2015, Hélène Conway-Mouret was appointed director of the international sector of the Fondation Jean-Jaurès. Under President Jean-Marc Ayrault, she was appointed advisor to the President.

As part of her parliamentary mandate, she sits on the Board of Directors of the Agency for French Education Abroad (AEFE) and the Institut français.

She is also a member of the Jean Monnet Foundation for Europe, the Maison de l'Europe de Paris and the Assemblywomen, as well as the associations “Les chemins de la réussite” and “Excision parlons-en”.

== Political positions ==
Hélène Conway-Mouret is a specialist in armaments and defense issues, particularly European defense and security. Throughout her parliamentary term, she has drafted several reports on European defense, the SCAF (Future Combat Air System) and official development assistance.

Hélène Conway-Mouret has encouraged French students to take part in the Erasmus Programme and live abroad to increase their human capital. She believes that French expatriates reflect well on French diplomacy. Additionally, she has worked on making it easier for French citizens who settle back in France after they have lived abroad for several years to enroll in the French healthcare, retirement and social security systems.

She supported the marriage and adoption for same-sex couples law. In January 2013, months before it became the law of the land in France, she penned an opinion piece in Le Figaro arguing that same-sex marriage had been a success abroad, and that France should look beyond its borders and legalise it.

She is opposed to the repeal of French citizenship for dual citizens who commit terrorist activities, arguing that it would target dual citizens over regular French citizens. She has penned an opinion piece arguing against the 2016 bill.

She also introduced a bill in the Senate in 2023 to introduce a menstrual break for women suffering from painful periods.

== Recognition ==
Conway-Mouret is a Knight of the National Order of Merit. She became a Grand Officer of the Order of Saint-Charles in 2013.
