= The Republicans group =

The Republicans group may refer to:

- The Republicans group (National Assembly), the French National Assembly parliamentary group
- The Republicans group (Senate), the French Senate parliamentary group
