= Brisepierre =

Brisepierre is a French surname. Notable people with the surname include:

- Jacqueline Brisepierre (1945–2025), French gymnast
- Paulette Brisepierre (1917–2012), French politician and Moroccan businessperson
