= Senate Republicans =

Senate Republicans may refer to:

- Senate Republican Conference, United States
- Senate Republicans (France)
