= André Pourny =

French politician (1928–2018)

André Pourny (30 November 1928 – 10 June 2018) was a French politician. He represented Saone-et-Loire in the Senate from 1986 to 2004 and was a member of The Republicans.
