= 2021 French consular elections =

Assembly elections were held for the Assembly of French Citizens Abroad between 21 and 30 May 2021. French people living outside France were called upon to elect, for the second time, 442 advisers to French people living abroad and 68 consular delegates. Initially scheduled for May 2020, the elections were postponed for a year due to the COVID-19 pandemic.

== See also ==
- Elections in France
