= André Maman =

French politician and Romance philologist

Member of the French Senate for French citizens living abroad
- In office 27 September 1992 – 30 September 2001

Personal details
- Born: 9 June 1927 Oran, Algeria
- Died: 13 April 2018 (aged 90) Princeton, New Jersey, U.S.
- Education: Institut d'études politiques de Toulouse; University of Paris

André Maman (9 June 1927 – 13 April 2018) was a French politician and Romance philologist.

Born in Oran, French Algeria on 9 June 1927, Maman attended the University of Toulouse and the Sorbonne, then worked as a lawyer. He began teaching in Norway and Canada, and later moved to the United States, joining the Princeton University faculty in 1958. From 1992 to 2001, Maman represented French citizens living abroad on behalf of the Centrist Union group in the French Senate. He was named Commandeur of the Legion of Honour in 2003 and was an officer of the Ordre des Palmes Académiques. Maman died at home in Princeton, New Jersey on 13 April 2018.
