= Jean-Yves Leconte =

French politician (born 1966)

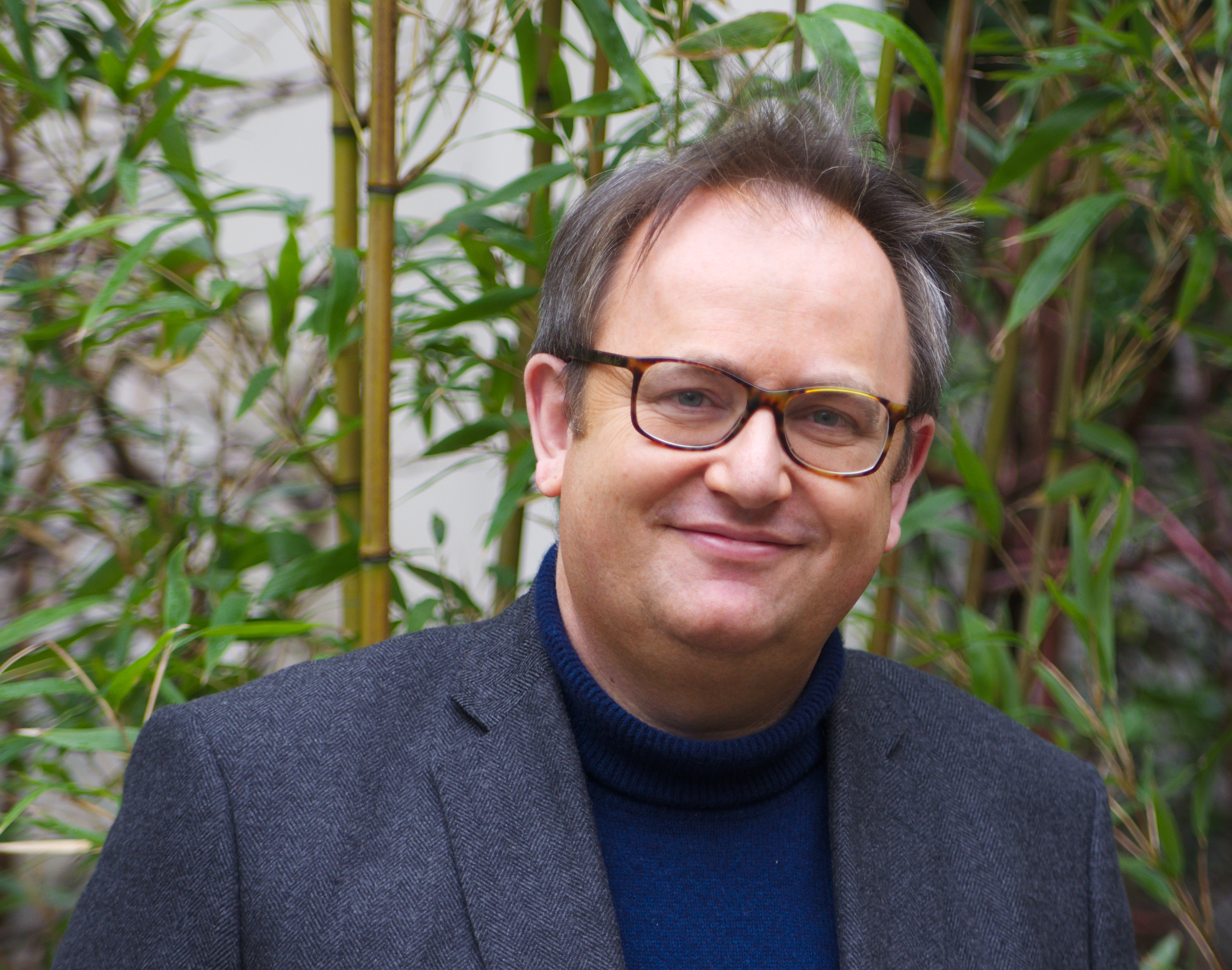

Member of the French Senate for French citizens living abroad
- In office 25 September 2011 – 25 September 2023

Personal details
- Born: 31 October 1966 (age 59) Paris, France
- Party: Socialist Party
- Education: École Centrale Paris

Jean-Yves Leconte (born 31 October 1966 in Paris) was a member of the Senate of France, representing the constituency of French citizens living abroad from 2011 to 2023. He is a member of the Socialist Party.

Leconte lived more than 20 years in Poland and was a member of the Assembly of French Citizens Abroad from 1994.
