= Jean-Paul Emorine =

French politician

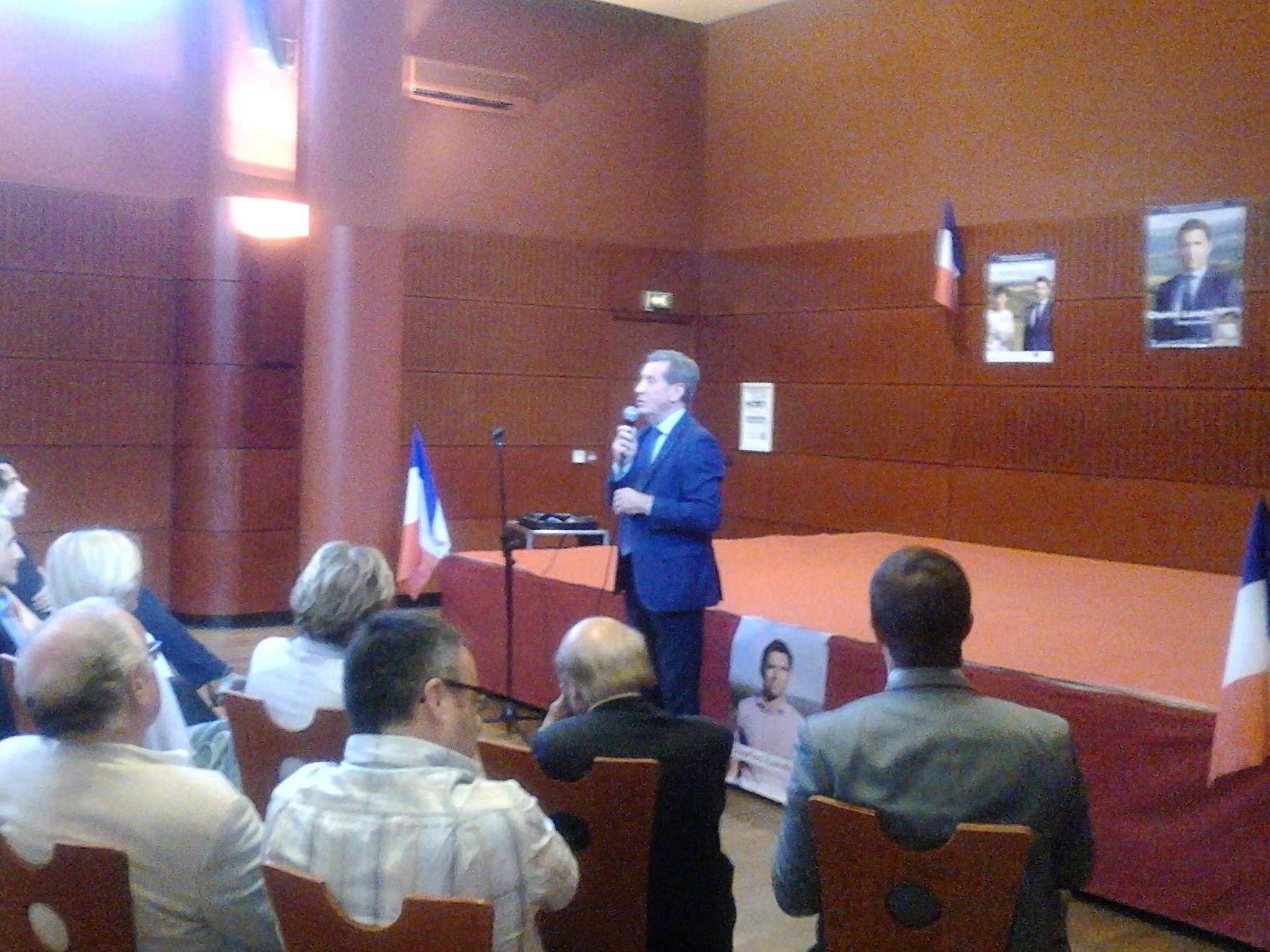
Jean-Paul Emorine

Jean-Paul Emorine (born 20 March 1944) is a former member of the Senate of France, representing the Saône-et-Loire department from 1995 to 2020. He is a member of the Union for a Popular Movement.

== Biography ==
A farmer by profession, he was elected senator for Saône-et-Loire on September 24, 1995, and re-elected on September 26, 2004, and September 28, 2014. He was chairman of the Committee on Economic Affairs, Sustainable Development, and Regional Planning from 2004 to 2011.

He supported Bruno Le Maire in the 2016 Republican presidential primary. In September 2016, as part of his campaign, he was appointed advisor for relations with senators, alongside Gérard Cornu.

On July 13, 2017, he was appointed Secretary of the Senate.

He left LR in early 2018 to protest against Laurent Wauquiez policies.

He was made a Knight of the Legion of Honor on November 1, 2024, with the medal presented by Dominique Perben.

== Bibliography ==
- Page on the Senate website (in French)
