= Christophe-André Frassa =

French politician

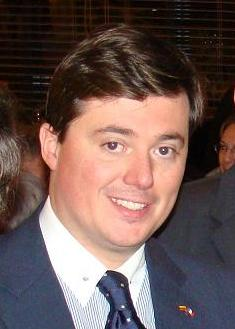

Member of the French Senate for French citizens living abroad
- Incumbent
- Assumed office 1 October 2008

Personal details
- Born: 4 February 1968 (age 58) Monaco
- Party: The Republicans
- Education: University of Nice; Tufts University; Paris-Sorbonne University; Sciences Po

Christophe-André Frassa (born 4 February 1968) is a French politician and a member of the Senate of France. He is a member of the Union for a Popular Movement Party.

== Bibliography ==
- Page on the Senate website

http://www.senat.fr/listes/senatl.html
