= Henri de Raincourt =

French politician (born 1948)

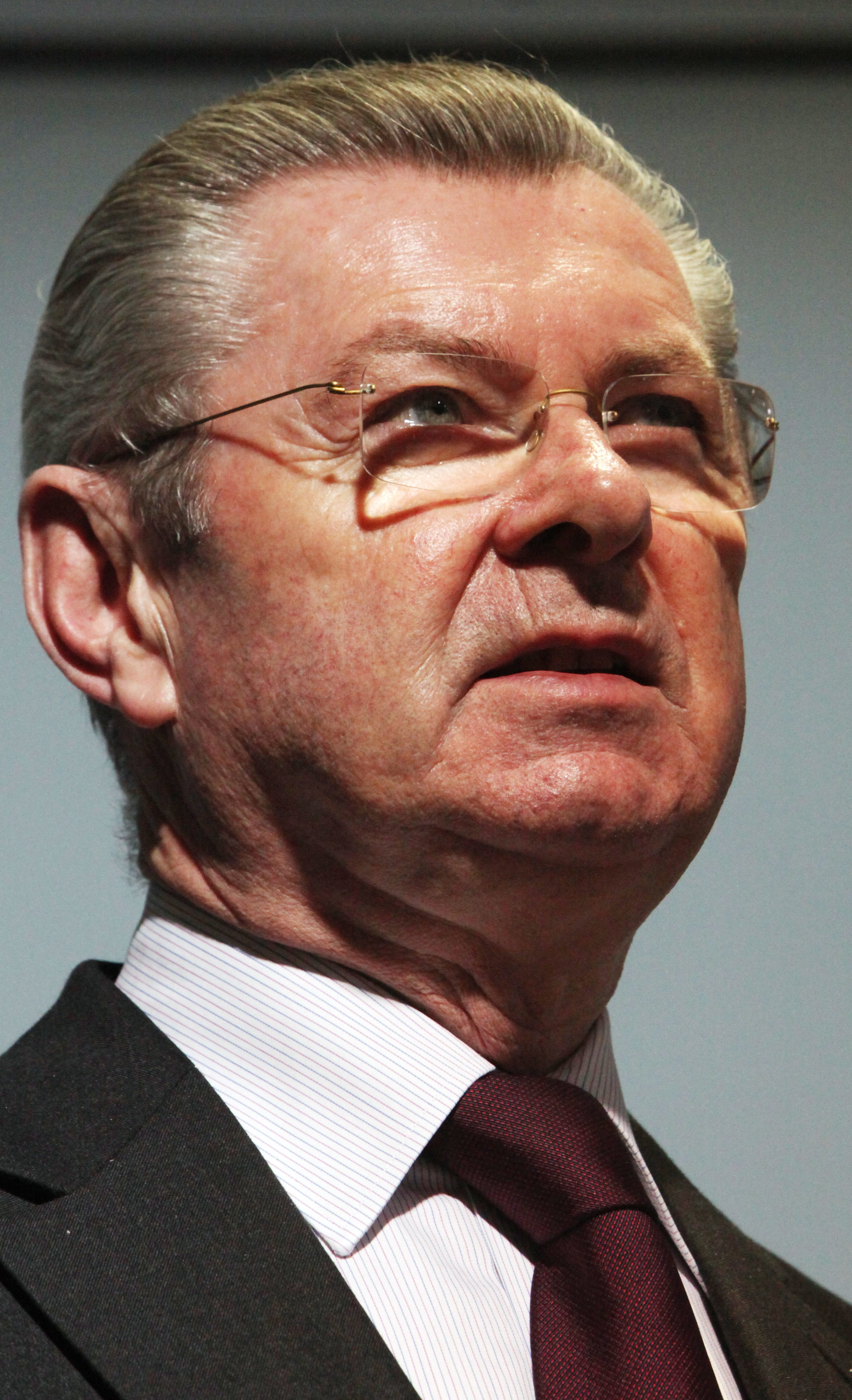

Minister for Relations with Parliament
- In office 2009–2010
- President: Nicolas Sarkozy
- Prime Minister: François Fillon
- Preceded by: Roger Karoutchi
- Succeeded by: Patrick Ollier

Member of the French Senate for Yonne
- In office 2012–2017
- Preceded by: André Villiers

Personal details
- Born: 17 November 1948 (age 77) Saint-Valérien, France
- Party: The Republicans
- Education: Unilasalle

Henri de Raincourt (French pronunciation: [ɑ̃ʁi də ʁɛ̃kuʁ]; born 17 November 1948) is a French politician who was Minister for Relations with Parliament (2009-2010) and Minister in charge of Co-operation (2010-2012) during Nicolas Sarkozy’s presidency. Previously a Senator representing the Yonne department, he is set to re-join the Senate in June 2012, a month after leaving the Government.

He was elected Senator for Yonne in 1986, and re-elected in 1995 and 2004; he was Chairman of the Union for a Popular Movement Senate caucus between 2008 and 2009. He has also served as President of the Yonne General Council between 1992 and 2008.

A farmer by profession, Henri de Raincourt is the son of Philippe de Raincourt (1909–1959), Senator for Yonne from 1948 to 1959. He is also a fourth-generation grandson of the Marquis de Sade.

He has been deputy chairman of the UMP since 2013.

== Political career ==
=== Governmental functions ===
- Minister in charge of Relationships with Parliament: 2009–2010.
- Minister in charge of Co-operation under the Minister of Foreign and European Affairs: 2010–2012.

=== Electoral mandates ===
==== Senate of France ====
- Chairman of the Union for a Popular Movement Group in the Senate: 2008–2009.
- Chairman of the Republicans and Independents Group in the Senate: 1995–2002. Re-elected in 1998, 2001.
- Senator for Yonne : 1986-2009 (Became minister in 2009). Elected in 1986, re-elected in 1995, 2004, 2008.

==== Regional Council ====
- Regional Councillor of Bourgogne: Since 2010.

==== General Council ====
- President of the Yonne General Council: 1992–2008. Re-elected in 1994, 1994, 2001, 2004.
- Vice President of the Yonne General Council: 1982–1992. Re-elected in 1985, 1988.
- General Councillor of Yonne: 1980–2008. Re-elected in 1982, 1988, 1994, 2001.

==== Municipal Council ====
- Mayor of Saint-Valérien, Yonne: 1977–2001. Reelected in 1983, 1989, 1995.
- Municipal Councillor of Saint-Valérien, Yonne: Since 1977. Reelected in 1983, 1989, 1995, 2001, 2008.

==== Community of Communes Council ====
- President of the Gâtinais-en-Bourgogne Community of Communes Council: Since 2008.
- Member of the Gâtinais-en-Bourgogne Community of Communes Council: Since 2008.
