= Richard Yung =

French politician

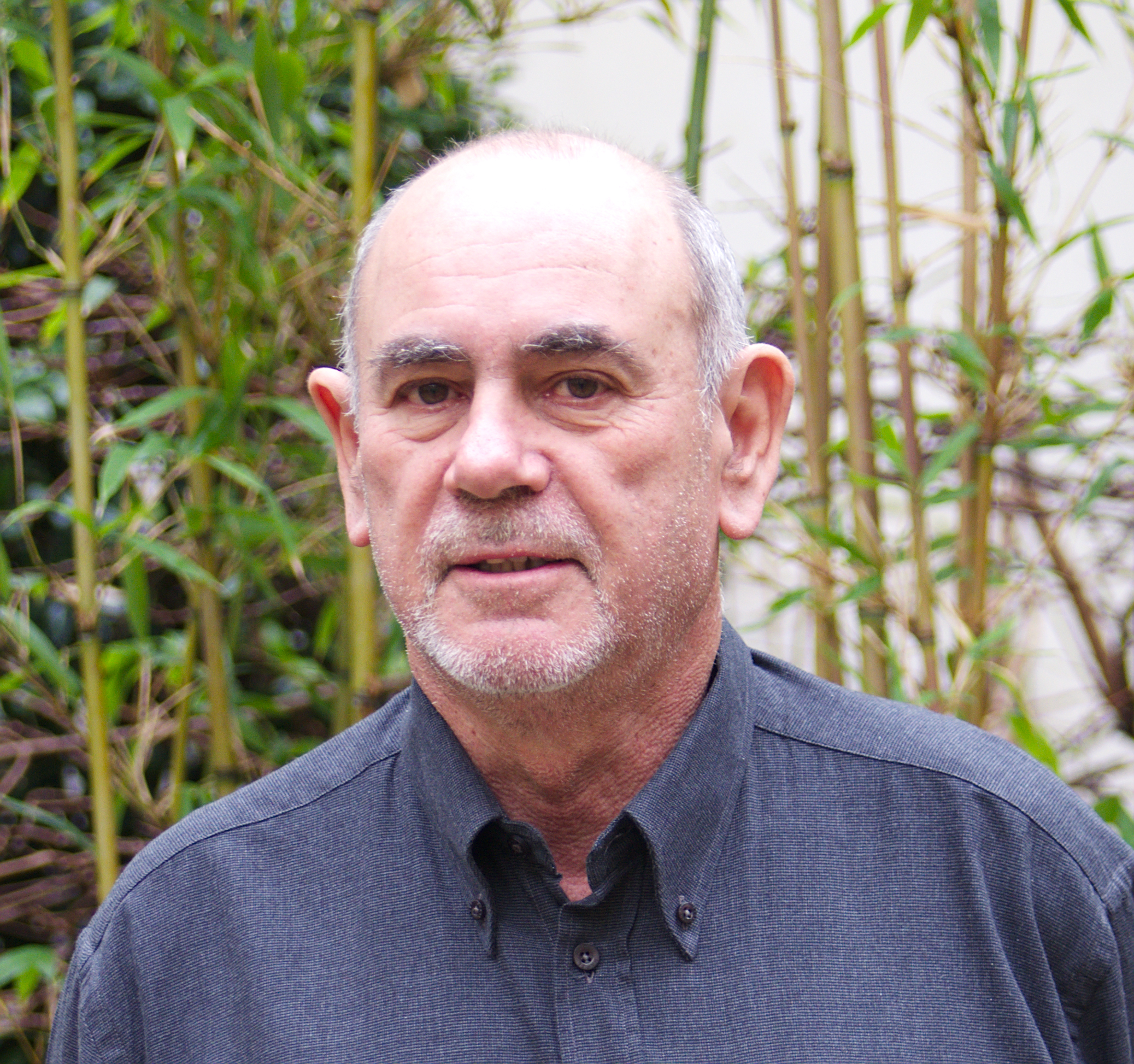

Member of the French Senate for French citizens living abroad
- Incumbent
- Assumed office 1 October 2004

Personal details
- Born: 22 September 1947 (age 79) Amboise, France
- Party: La République En Marche!
- Education: Sciences Po; Panthéon-Sorbonne University

Richard Yung (born 22 September 1947) is a member of the Senate of France, representing the constituency of French citizens living abroad. He was a member of the Socialist Party from 1974 to 2017, then he left to join La République En Marche! in June 2017.
