= Claudine Lepage =

French politician

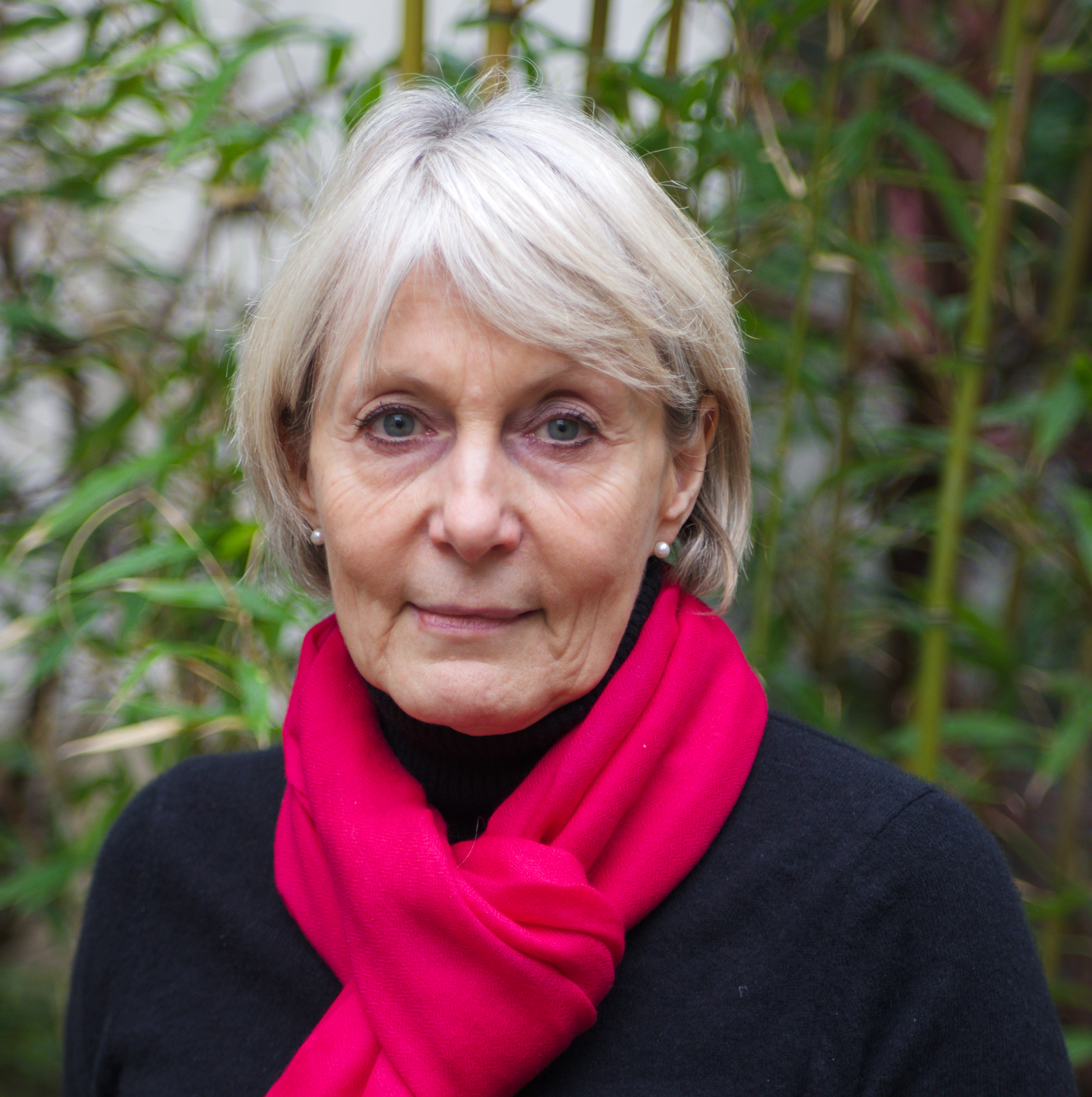

Member of the French Senate for French citizens living abroad
- Incumbent
- Assumed office 21 September 2008

Personal details
- Born: 10 August 1949 (age 77) Paris, France
- Party: Socialist Party
- Education: Paris-Sorbonne University

Claudine Lepage (born 10 August 1949) is a member of the Senate of France, representing the constituency of French citizens living abroad. She is a member of the Socialist Party.
