= Mathieu Darnaud =

French politician (born 1975)

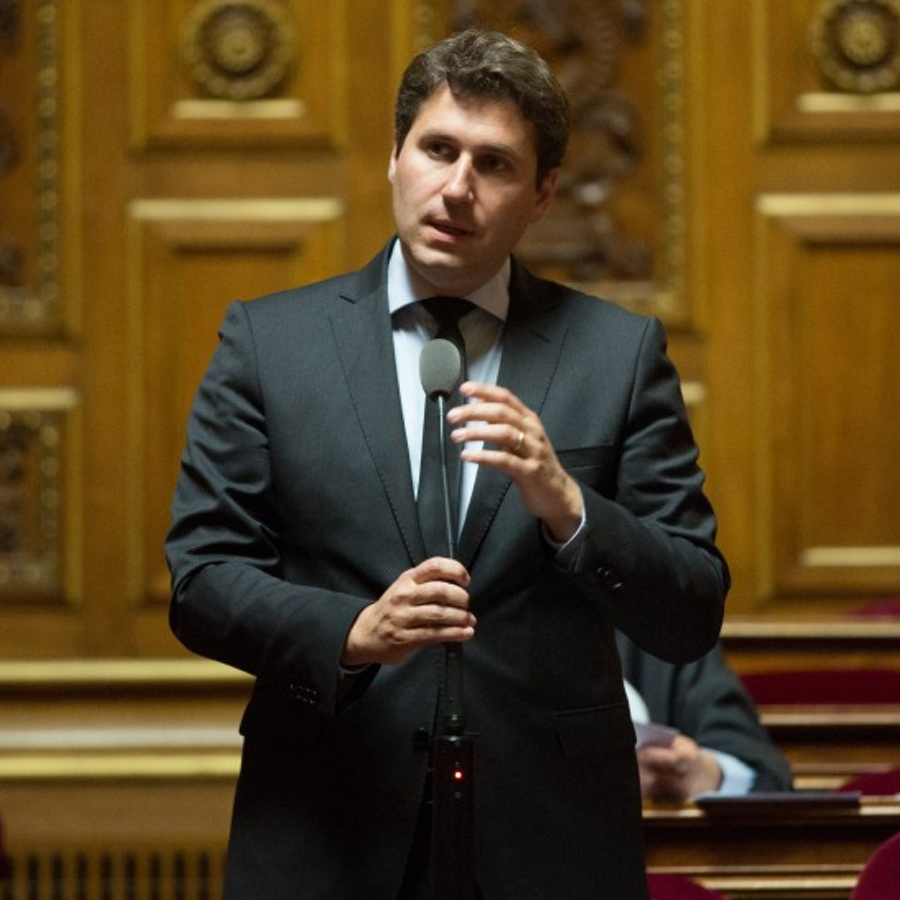
- Darnaud in 2017

President of The Republicans group in the Senate
- Incumbent
- Assumed office 1 October 2024
- Preceded by: Bruno Retailleau

French Senator from Ardèche
- Incumbent
- Assumed office 1 October 2014

Mayor of Guilherand-Granges
- In office 16 March 2008 – 29 September 2017
- Preceded by: Henri-Jean Arnaud
- Succeeded by: Sylvie Gaucher

Member of the Regional Council of Rhône-Alpes
- In office 21 March 2010 – 18 October 2014

Personal details
- Born: 11 July 1975 (age 51) Valence, France
- Party: Rally for the Republic (until 2002); Union for a Popular Movement (2002–2015); The Republicans (2015–present)
- Education: Institut d'études politiques de Lyon

Mathieu Darnaud (French pronunciation: [matjø daʁno]; born 11 July 1975) is a French politician who has presided over the Senate Republicans since 1 October 2024. A member of The Republicans (LR), he has been a Senator for Ardèche since 2014. He served as First Vice President under Senate President Gérard Larcher in 2023 and 2024.

Darnaud previously served as Mayor of Guilherand-Granges, Ardèche (2008–2017) and a member of the Regional Council of Rhône-Alpes (2010–2014). In 2014 and 2015, he presided over the communauté de communes Rhône Crussol, seated in Guilherand-Granges.
