= Marcel Gatuing =

French politician

Marcel Gatuing (3 March 1894 – 29 June 1970) was a French politician.

Gatuing was born in Mostaganem, French Algeria. He represented the Popular Republican Movement (MRP) in the Constituent Assembly elected in 1945, in the Constituent Assembly elected in 1946 and in the Senate from 1946 to 1951.
