= Monique Cerisier-ben Guiga =

French politician (1942–2021)

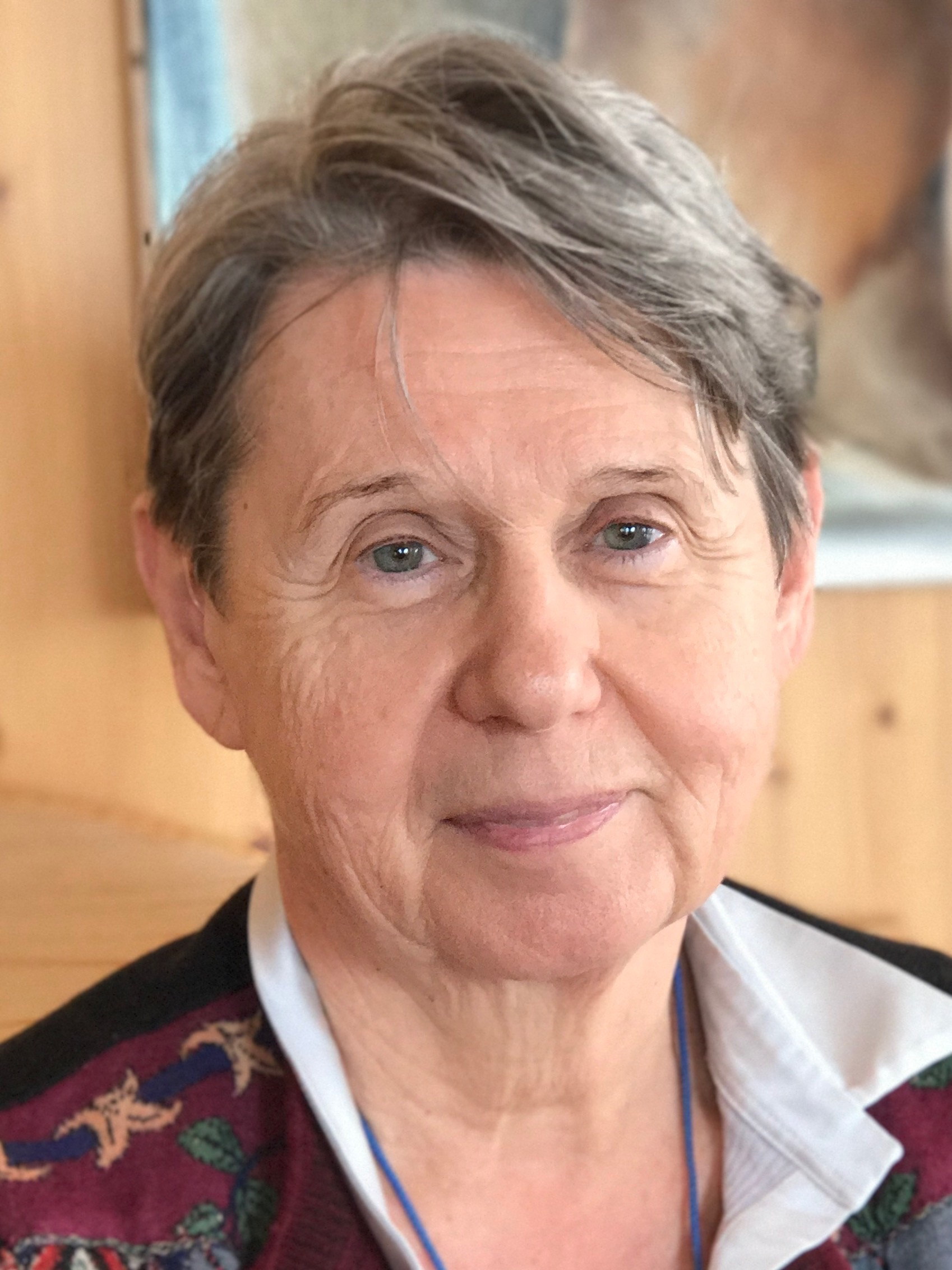
- Monique Cerisier-ben Guiga in 2017

Member of the French Senate for French citizens living abroad
- In office 1 October 1992 – 1 October 2011

Personal details
- Born: 20 June 1942 Saint-Calais, France
- Died: 9 May 2021 (aged 78) Paris, France
- Party: Socialist Party
- Education: Faculté des lettres de Paris

Monique Cerisier-ben Guiga (20 June 1942 – 9 May 2021) was a member of the Senate of France, representing French citizens living abroad. She was a member of the Socialist Party.
