= Jacques Bellanger =

French politician (1931–2021)

Member of the Senate of France
- In office 19 November 1997 – 30 September 2004
- Preceded by: Michel Rocard
- Constituency: Yvelines
- In office 28 September 1986 – 23 September 1995
- Constituency: Yvelines

Personal details
- Born: 25 June 1931 Fontainebleau, France
- Died: 30 September 2021 (aged 90)
- Party: PS

Jacques Bellanger (25 June 1931 – 30 September 2021) was a French politician. A member of the Socialist Party, he served in the Senate from 1986 to 1995 and again from 1997 to 2004.
