= Jean-Pierre Bansard =

French businessman and politician (1940–2024)

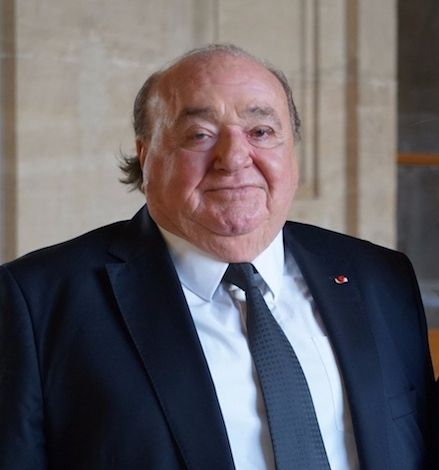
- Bansard in 2017

Member of the Senate
- In office 1 October 2021 – 16 August 2024
- Succeeded by: Sophie Briante Guillemont
- Parliamentary group: REP
- Constituency: French citizens living abroad (série 2)
- In office 2 October 2017 – 27 July 2018
- Parliamentary group: REP
- Constituency: French citizens living abroad (série 1)

Personal details
- Born: Jean-Pierre Bensaïd; 15 May 1940 Oran
- Died: 16 August 2024 (aged 84) Neuilly-sur-Seine
- Party: Alliance solidaire des Français de l'étranger (ASFE)

Jean-Pierre Bansard (15 May 1940 – 16 August 2024) was a French businessman and politician. He was born in Oran, French Algeria. He was a senator from 2017 to 2018 and from 2021 until his death. Bansard died on 16 August 2024, at the age of 84.
