= Christian Cointat =

French politician (born 1943)

Christian Cointat (born 11 July 1943 in Tresques) is a member of the Senate of France. He represents the constituency of French citizens living abroad, and is a member of the Union for a Popular Movement.
