= Saint-Valérien, Yonne =

Saint-Valérien
- Commune
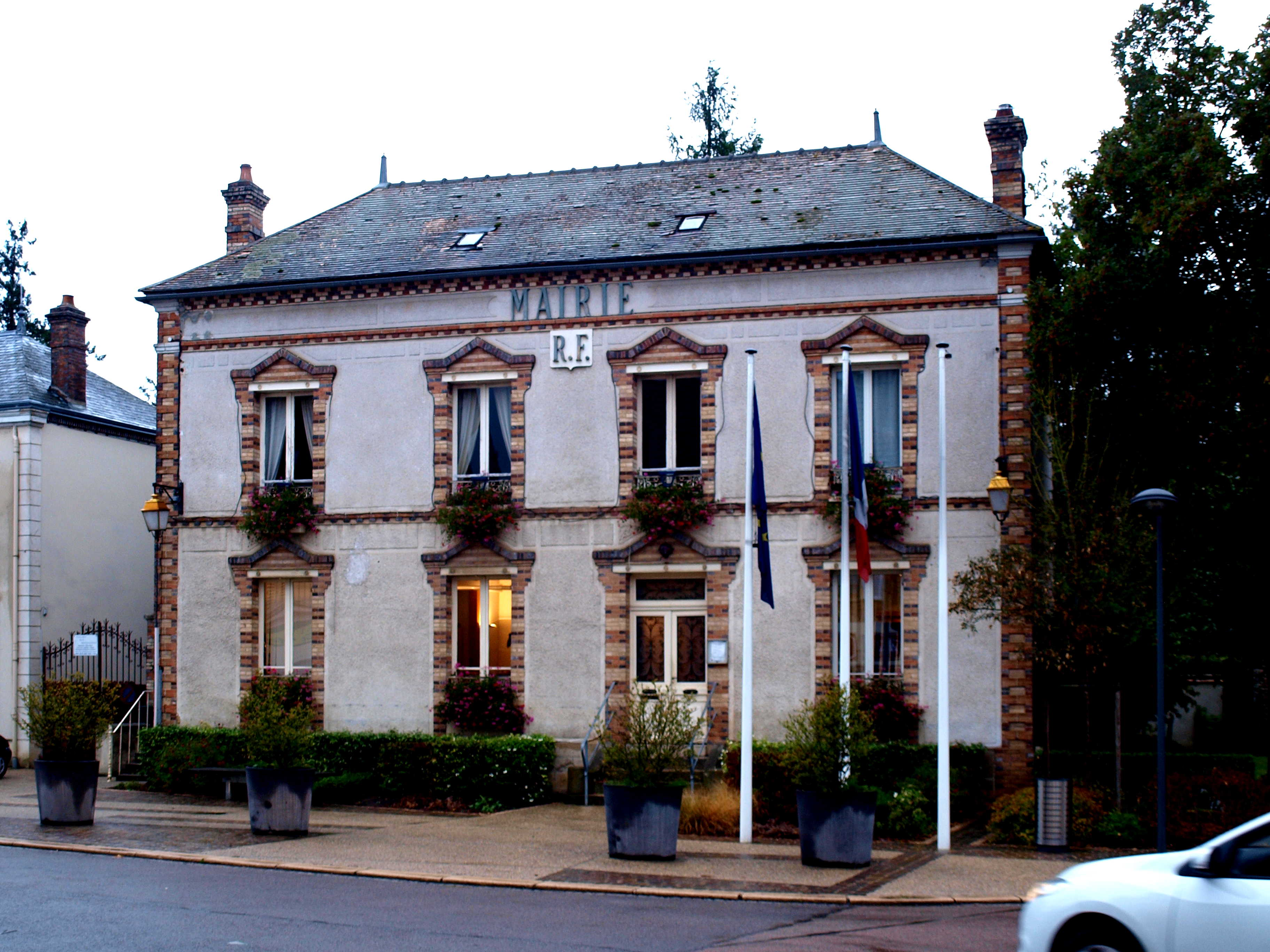
- The town hall in Saint-Valérien

- Coat of arms
- Location of Saint-Valérien
- Location within France Location within Bourgogne-Franche-Comté
- Coordinates: 48°10′48″N 3°05′45″E
- Country: France
- Region: Bourgogne-Franche-Comté
- Department: Yonne
- Arrondissement: Sens
- Canton: Gâtinais en Bourgogne

Government
  - Mayor (2020–2026): Jérôme Cordier
- Area^{1}: 22.31 km^{2} (8.61 sq mi)
- Highest elevation: 181 m (594 ft)
- Lowest elevation: 137 m (449 ft)
- Population (2023): 1,823
  - Density: 81.71/km^{2} (211.6/sq mi)
- Time zone: UTC+01:00 (CET)
  - Summer (DST): UTC+02:00 (CEST)
- INSEE/Postal code: 89370 /89150
- ^{1} French Land Register data, which excludes lakes, ponds, glaciers > 1 km^{2} (0.386 sq mi or 247 acres) and river estuaries.

Saint-Valérien (French pronunciation: [sɛ̃ valeʁjɛ̃]) is a commune in the Yonne department in Bourgogne-Franche-Comté in north-central France.

== See also ==
- Communes of the Yonne department
