= Robert del Picchia =

French politician (1942–2026)

Member of the French Senate for French citizens living abroad
- In office 1 October 1998 – 1 October 2021

Personal details
- Born: 10 November 1942 Marseille, France
- Died: 7 February 2026 (aged 83) Vienna, Austria
- Party: UMP; Agir

Robert del Picchia (10 November 1942 – 7 February 2026) was a French journalist and politician who was a member of the Senate of France from 1998 to 2021. He was a member of the Union for a Popular Movement Party until 2010. Del Picchia died on 7 February 2026, at the age of 83.

== Bibliography ==
- Page on the Senate website
