= Michel Guerry =

French politician (born 1932)

Michel Guerry (born 2 December 1932) is a French politician and a former member of the Senate of France from 2001 to 2011. He is a member of the Union for a Popular Movement.
