= Philippe Leroy (politician) =

French politician (1940–2019)

Member of the French Senate for Moselle
- In office 1 October 2001 – 1 October 2017

President of the General council of Moselle
- In office 1 April 1992 – 31 March 2011
- Preceded by: Julien Schvartz
- Succeeded by: Patrick Weiten

Personal details
- Born: 3 February 1940 Lille, France
- Died: 19 August 2019 (aged 79) Château-Salins, France
- Party: UMP; The Republicans
- Education: Institut national agronomique

Philippe Leroy (3 February 1940 – 19 August 2019) was a member of the Senate of France from 2001 until 2017, representing the Moselle department. He was a member of the Union for a Popular Movement.
