= Xavier de Villepin =

French civil servant and politician (1926–2014)

Member of the French Senate for French citizens living abroad
- In office 1983–2004

Personal details
- Born: 14 March 1926 Brussels, Belgium
- Died: 30 October 2014 (aged 88) Paris, France
- Party: UDF; UMP
- Spouse: Yvonne Hétier
- Relatives: Dominique de Villepin (son); Véronique de Villepin (daughter); Patrick de Villepin (son)
- Education: HEC Paris; Harvard Business School

Joseph Marie Benoît François Xavier Galouzeau de Villepin (French pronunciation: [ʒozɛf maʁi bənwa fʁɑ̃swa ɡzavje ɡaluzo də vilpɛ̃]; born 14 March 1926 – 30 October 2014), simply known as Xavier de Villepin, was a former high-ranking civil servant of France, and a former French senator from the center-right UMP party (and before that from the more centrist UDF party). He was the father of the former Prime Minister of France, Dominique de Villepin.

== Biography ==
Xavier de Villepin graduated from the renowned French business school HEC Paris in 1949 and later from the Harvard Business School. He took part in the French Resistance in 1944. As a French civil servant, he spent many years overseas. From 1950 until 1979, he served in chronological order in French Algeria, in Australia, in the French protectorate of Morocco, in Venezuela, and finally in the United States. He became a member of the Association of French Citizens Abroad (Union des Français de l'Étranger) in 1960, and its 2nd vice-president in 1979.

Xavier de Villepin was elected to the French Senate in 1986 by the constituency of the French citizens living abroad, and remained a French senator until September 2004, when he chose not to run for a third term. In 1993 he was elected chairman of the French Senate Committee on Foreign Affairs, Defense, and Armed Forces (Commission des affaires étrangères, de la défense et des forces armées). He resigned from the committee in 2002 following the appointment of his son Dominique de Villepin as Minister of Foreign Affairs.
