= Pierre Jarlier =

French politician (born 1954)

Pierre Jarlier (born 14 July 1954) is a French politician and a former member of the Senate of France. He represented the Cantal department (since 27 September 1998) and is a member of the Radical Party.
