= André Trillard =

French politician (born 1947)

André Trillard (born 24 October 1947) is a member of the Senate of France, representing the Loire-Atlantique department. He is a member of the Union for a Popular Movement.
