= Dominique Braye =

French politician (born 1947)

Dominique Braye (born 21 October 1947) is a former member of the Senate of France, representing the Yvelines department from 1995 to 2011. He is a member of the Union for a Popular Movement.
