= André Ferrand =

French politician

Member of the French Senate
- In office 1998–2014

Personal details
- Born: 22 February 1936 (age 90) Lyon, France
- Party: The Republicans
- Education: Emlyon Business School; HEC Paris

André Ferrand (born 22 February 1936) is a French politician and a member of the Senate of France. He is a member of the Union for a Popular Movement Party.

== Bibliography ==
- Page on the Senate website
