= Joëlle Garriaud-Maylam =

French politician

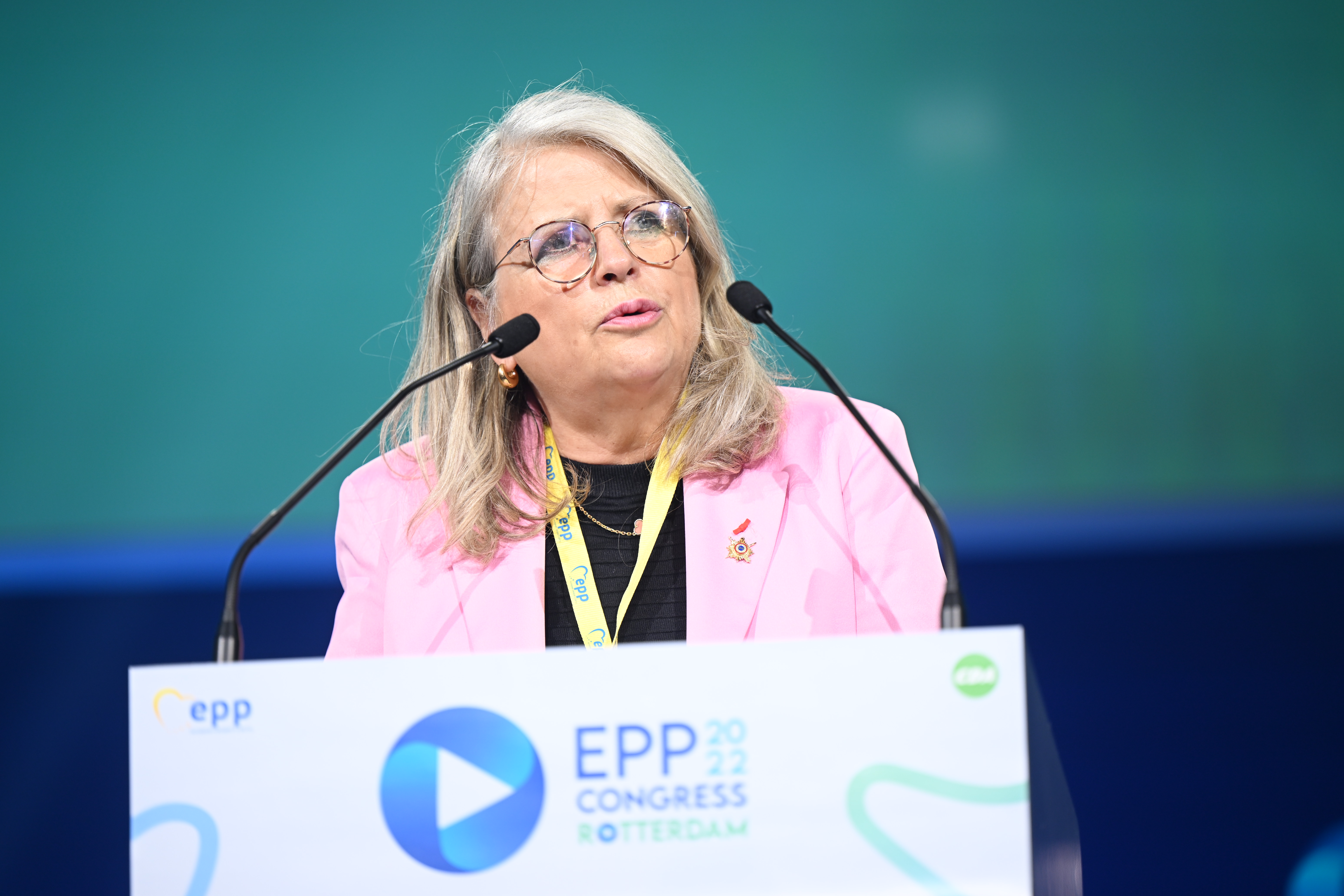

Member of the French Senate for French citizens living abroad
- In office 1 October 2004 – 2 October 2023

President of the NATO Parliamentary Assembly
- In office November 28, 2022 – October 2, 2023
- Preceded by: Gerry Connolly
- Succeeded by: Michał Szczerba

Personal details
- Born: 20 March 1955 (age 71) Maghnia, Algeria
- Party: The Republicans
- Spouse: Tony Maylam
- Education: Charles University; Yale University

Joëlle Garriaud-Maylam (born 20 March 1955) is a French politician of the Republicans (LR) who has been a member of the Senate of France from 2004 to 2023.

== Political career ==
In the Senate, Garriaud-Maylam has been serving on the Committee on Foreign Affairs and Defense and the Committee on European Affairs.

In addition to her committee assignments, Garriaud-Maylam is part of the Senate's friendship groups with East Africa, Southeast Asia and the Gulf Countries. She has also been a member of the French delegation to the NATO Parliamentary Assembly since 2008. She was appointed president of NATO Parliamentary Assembly in 2022, and served in that position until she retired from the French Senate in 2023.

== Other activities ==
- Institute of Advanced Studies in National Defence (IHEDN), Member of the Board of Directors

== Personal life ==
Garriaud-Maylam married Anthony F. Maylam in 1985.
