= Christiane Kammermann =

French politician

Christiane Kammermann (born 10 July 1932 in Boulogne-Billancourt) is a French politician and a member of the Senate of France. She is a member of the Union for a Popular Movement Party.
