= Louis Duvernois =

French politician (born 1941)

Louis Duvernois (born 17 May 1941 in Le Creusot) is a French politician who served as a member of the Senate of France from 2001 to 2017. He is a member of the Union for a Popular Movement.

== Biography ==
Born on May 17, 1941, in Le Creusot (Saône-et-Loire), Louis Duvernois graduated from the École supérieure de commerce de Dijon and the Centre de formation des journalistes de Paris. In 1965, he began his career as a correspondent for Agence France-Presse in Canada. He continued his career as editor-in-chief of the foreign service at the daily newspaper Le Soleil in Quebec City, then as technical advisor to the Quebec Ministry of Communications, before becoming a correspondent to the UN as part of the United Nations Development Program.

In 1985, he was elected representative of French citizens in Canada to the High Assembly of French Citizens Abroad, where in 1995 he participated in the creation of the Rassemblement des Français de l'étranger (RFE) group.

Louis Duvernois was elected Senate (France) representing French citizens living outside France on September 23, 2001. He was not re-elected in September 2017.

He supports François Fillon in the 2016 Republican presidential primary.

He sponsored Laurent Wauquiez for the 2017 Republican Party convention, during which the party president was elected.

== Bibliography ==
- Page on the Senate website (in French)
