= Paulette Brisepierre =

French politician (1917–2012)

Senator in the Senate of France
- In office 24 September 1989 – 30 September 2008

Personal details
- Born: 21 April 1917 Bordeaux, France
- Died: 7 July 2012 (aged 95) Marrakesh, Morocco
- Party: Rally for the Republic; Union for a Popular Movement
- Education: University of Michigan

Paulette Louise Fernande Mireille Brisepierre (21 April 1917 – 7 July 2012) was a French politician and Moroccan Businessperson. She was a member for Rally for the Republic and the Union for a Popular Movement.

== Early life ==
Brisepierre was born on 21 April 1917 in Bordeaux in Gironde. She attended Lycée Molière and Lycée Victor-Duruy in Paris. She married Baron Lionel de la Fontaine and they had seven children: François-Xavier, Claude, Patrick, Jean-Eric, Anne, Marie-Dorée and Lionel. She graduated from the University of Michigan, then decided to follow her husband, an orange exporter, to Marrakesh. When her husband died in 1961, she received an accounting degree and took over his production and export business until the company was nationalised in 1966. As a result, she created the Union of the French in Marrakesh to receive compensation from the Moroccan government.

== Political career ==
She was elected to the Assembly of French Citizens Abroad in 1968, serving as president from 1974 to 1997. She was asked several times by the French government to be an advisor of the Economic and Social Council, from 1975 to 1976 in the division for economic expansion and cooperation, from 1978 to 1979 in the division for the environment and from 1987 to 1988 in the division for foreign relations. She was an advisor on French external trade from 1968.

Brisepierre twice ran unsuccessfully for a position on the Senate but on 24 September 1989, she became the first female senator in the Senate representing French citizens living abroad. She was a member for the Rally for the Republic (RPR). She was re-elected in the 1988 legislative election. Brisepierre quickly became an expert in international relations, serving as a member of the Cultural Affairs Committee from 1989 to 1991 and as a member of the Foreign Affairs Committee in 1992. She was heavily involved in her committee work, reporting on the budget for cooperation in 1995 and on development assistance in 2005 and writing reports on Central Africa in 1998, reforming cooperation in 2001 and on the Horn of Africa in 2003. She was a member of the French Section of the Parliamentary Assembly of the Francophonie and the National Commission for Scholarships of the Agency for French Education Abroad. She travelled almost 500,000 kilometres (310,000 mi) during her first term in office to promote French expatriates around the world. She led the France-Central Africa Senate Friendship Group, the Mauritania section of the France-West Africa Senate Friendship Group, the Djibouti section of the France-Djibouti and Horn of Africa Senate Friendship Group, and the France-Morocco Senate Friendship Group in the Senate. She chaired the Senate delegation to the NATO Parliamentary Assembly in 2001 and campaigned for Morocco to be admitted as an observer.

Brisepierre focused her senatorial activities on developing the recognition and rights of French citizens living abroad. She supported bills to reform the voting process for French citizens living overseas and to create a public guarantee fund which would compensate French citizens who were forced to move abroad because of their nationality or due to serious political events. She also defended members of the Assembly of French Citizens Abroad and focused on expatriates dealing with debt and high school fees. She also emphasised French citizens living in Bangui in May 1996 and French citizens living in Congo in October 1997.

She was a member and then later vice president of the Delegation for Women's Rights and Equal Opportunities for Men and Women and a member of the Committee on Foreign Affairs, Defense and Armed Forces. She voted in favour of safeguarding protection for pensions, reducing working hours, establishing a civil solidarity pact, promoting equality between men and women, decentralising the country and amended title XV of the Constitution. Brisepierre served as vice president of the PRP group in the Senate from April 1993 to October 1995 and as president of the RPR group in the Assembly of French Citizens Abroad. She was the oldest member of the Senate from 2001 to 30 September 2008, but she was encouraged not to run from re-election due to her age.

== Later life ==
She continued to serve as the honorary president of the France-Morocco friendship group in the Senate until her death on 7 July 2012 in Marrakesh at the age of 95. On her death, a national tribute was held in her honour by the Parliament of Morocco. She was honoured as a Knight of the Legion of Honour, an Officer of the Order of National Merit and a Knight of the Order of Agricultural Merit.
