= Jean-Pierre Cantegrit =

French politician

Jean-Pierre Cantegrit (born 2 July 1933) was a member of the Senate of France, representing French citizens living abroad from 1977 to 2017. He is a member of the Union for a Popular Movement.
