= Philippe Nachbar =

French politician

Member of the French Senate for Meurthe-et-Moselle
- In office 1 October 1992 – 31 December 2022
- Succeeded by: Véronique Del Fabro

Personal details
- Born: 26 September 1950 (age 74); Jarny, France
- Political party: The Republicans

Philippe Nachbar (born 26 September 1950) is a former member of the Senate of France, representing the Meurthe-et-Moselle department. He is a member of the Union for a Popular Movement.
