= French people living outside France =

French people living outside France (French: Français établis hors de France) are French citizens living outside the current territory of the French Republic.

Candidates who came out on top in each country in the first round of 2022 French presidential election

Candidates who came out on top in each country in the first round of 2017 French presidential election

At the end of 2019, the French presence abroad was estimated at more than 2.5 million people. They had the right to vote in the 2021 French consular elections.

Since 2012, French people living outside France have been represented in the National Assembly by eleven members of parliament elected in the eleven constituencies for French residents overseas.

== Elections ==
=== 2022 ===
Results by department
Department	Emmanuel Macron		Marine Le Pen	
Department	Votes	%	Votes	%
French residents overseas	458,874	86.14%	73,830	13.86%
Total	18,768,639	58.55%	13,288,686	41.45%
Source: Minister of the Interior

Results by department
Department	Emmanuel Macron		Marine Le Pen		Jean-Luc Mélenchon		Éric Zemmour		Valérie Pécresse		Yannick Jadot		Jean Lassalle		Fabien Roussel		Nicolas Dupont-Aignan		Anne Hidalgo		Philippe Poutou		Nathalie Arthaud	
Department	Votes	%	Votes	%	Votes	%	Votes	%	Votes	%	Votes	%	Votes	%	Votes	%	Votes	%	Votes	%	Votes	%	Votes	%
French residents overseas	224,957	45.09%	26,380	5.29%	109,394	21.92%	43,252	8.67%	20,956	4.20%	40,774	8.17%	5,964	1.20%	3,266	0.65%	7,074	1.22%	12,489	2.50%	3,145	0.63%	1,300	0.26%
Total																								
Source: Ministry of Interior

=== 2017 ===
Results by department
Department	Emmanuel Macron		Marine Le Pen	
Department	Votes	%	Votes	%
French residents overseas	496,344	89.31	59,415	10.69
Total	20,743,128	66.10	10,638,475	33.90
Source: Ministry of the Interior

Department	Emmanuel Macron		Marine Le Pen		François Fillon		Jean-Luc Mélenchon		Benoît Hamon		Nicolas Dupont-Aignan		Jean Lassalle		Philippe Poutou		François Asselineau		Nathalie Arthaud		Jacques Cheminade	
Department	Votes	%	Votes	%	Votes	%	Votes	%	Votes	%	Votes	%	Votes	%	Votes	%	Votes	%	Votes	%	Votes	%
French residents overseas	223,879	40.40	35,926	6.48	145,829	26.32	87,692	15.83	38,092	6.87	8,837	1.59	2,530	0.46	3,414	0.62	5,578	1.01	1,312	0.24	1,030	0.19
Total	8,656,346	24.01	7,678,491	21.30	7,212,995	20.01	7,059,951	19.58	2,291,288	6.36	1,695,000	4.70	435,301	1.21	394,505	1.09	332,547	0.92	232,384	0.64	65,586	0.18
Source: Ministry of the Interior

=== 2012 (Second round) ===
Results by department
Department	François Hollande		Nicolas Sarkozy	
Department	Votes	%	Votes	%
French overseas voters	206,053	46.94%	232,964	53.06%
Total	18,000,668	51.64%	16,860,685	48.36%
Source: European Election Database

== Maps ==
Candidates who came out on top in each country in the first round of 2012 French presidential election.
François Hollande
Marine Le Pen
Nicolas Sarkozy

Candidate who came out on top abroad in the second round of 2012 French presidential election.
François Hollande
Nicolas Sarkozy
Égalité

== See also ==
- British Overseas citizen
- Swiss abroad
- Diaspora politics
