= Alain Gournac =

French politician (born 1943)

Alain Gournac (born 13 September 1943 in L'Étang-la-Ville) is a French politician and was a member of the Senate of France. He represented the Yvelines department from 1995 to 2017. He is a member of the Union for a Popular Movement Party.
