= Gérard Cornu =

French politician

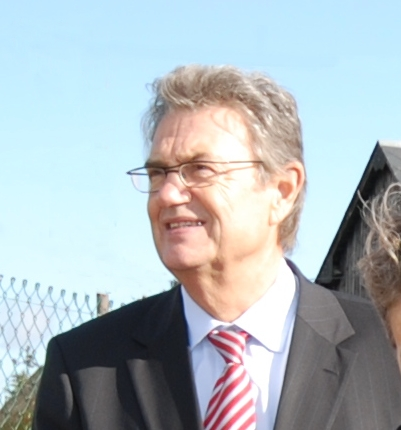
- Gérard Cornu

Member of the Senate of France
- Constituency: Eure-et-Loir

Personal details
- Born: 6 February 1952 (age 74)
- Party: Union for a Popular Movement

Gérard Cornu (born 6 February 1952) is a member of the Senate of France. He represents the Eure-et-Loir department, and is a member of the Union for a Popular Movement.

== Bibliography ==
- Page on the Senate website (in French)
