= Assembly of French Citizens Abroad =

Political body for French citizens abroad

Assembly of French Citizens Abroad Assemblée des Français de l'étranger
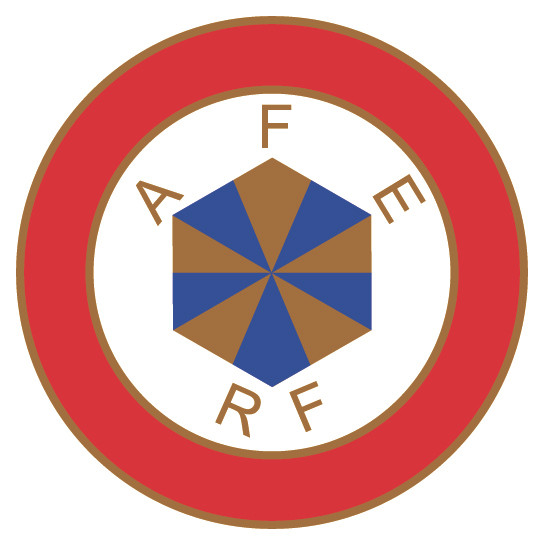

Leadership
- President: Hélène Degryse

Structure
- Seats: 90
- Political groups: Ecology and solidarity (ES): 30 seats; Solidarity and independents (SI): 14 seats; Independents, democrats, and progressists (IDP): 29 seats; Union of republicans, centers, and independents (URCI): 15 seats; Not appearing on the list of any group (NI): 2 seats

Elections
- Last election: 2021

Meeting place
- Centre de Conférences ministériel 27, Rue de la Convention, 15th arrondissement of Paris

Website
- http://www.assemblee-afe.fr/

The Assembly of French Citizens Abroad (French: Assemblée des Français de l'étranger) is the political body that represents French citizens living outside France. The assembly advises the government on issues involving French nationals living outside France, as well as the role of France in overseas developments. Membership consists of 90 representatives elected among and by an electorate composed of all 442 elected consular representatives (themselves elected directly by all 3 million French citizens living outside of France), across 15 worldwide electoral districts.

== History ==
The issue of representation for French nationals abroad was first addressed in the French Fourth Republic (1946–1958). Three seats were allocated to the Council of the Republic (the then-upper house of Parliament), representing citizens residing in Europe, America and Asia-Oceania. In addition, there were four agencies based in Paris also representing French interests abroad: the Union of French Chambers of Commerce Abroad, the Federation of French Teachers Abroad, the Federation of French Veterans Residing Outside France, and the Union of French Citizens Abroad (UFE). The conflict between these organization and the National Assembly in appointing the three members of the Council of the Republic led to the decision to form an entirely new body to represent French citizens abroad.

Foreign minister Georges Bidault signed the decree establishing the High Council of French Citizens Abroad (French: Conseil supérieur des Français de l'étranger, CSFE) in July 1948. The CSFE consisted of 55 members: the three Councillors of the Republic representing French nationals abroad, the presidents of the four organizations above, 42 elected members, and five members appointed by the Minister of Foreign Affairs. The first elections were held in 1970 in 70 countries.

Turnout in these elections suffered a decline from 1997, which prompted efforts to extensively reform the CSFE. It was renamed the Assembly of French Citizens Abroad. The proportion of elected members was further increased. In addition, the electoral boundaries were revised to account for the changing demographics of French nationals abroad.

== Role ==
The assembly is tasked with protecting the interests of French citizens abroad on issues such as the teaching of French, rights as citizens, social and economic problems, and taxation. They advise the French government on issues concerning French nationals living outside France and the role of France in overseas developments. The assembly also appoints representatives to various public agencies in France, including the National Stock Exchange, Permanent Commission for Employment and Vocational Training of French Citizens Abroad, etc.

The assembly meets four times a year. Bureau meetings take place in June and December, while plenary sessions are held in March and September.

== Organization ==
=== Members ===
The AFE is composed of 90 members elected by universal suffrage from 15 districts around the world who serve six-year terms

=== Secretariat ===
Day-to-day affairs are run by a general secretariat. The secretary general is appointed by the Minister of Foreign Affairs.

=== Committees ===
Members also join committees which prepare reports on specific issues which are submitted to the council's sessions. The permanent committees include:

- Commission of Laws, Regulations and Consular Affairs
- Commission of Security and Protection of People and Property
- Commission of Education, Cultural Affairs, Worldwide Audiovisual and Francophonie
- Commission of Social Affairs and Military Veterans
- Commission of Finance, Budget and Taxation
- Commission of Foreign trade, Sustainable Development, Employment and Training

== Elections ==
Elections to the assembly are staggered based on geographical location.

The 90 elected seats are distributed among 15 electoral districts proportional to population. The districts are as follows:

| Country | Chief city | Seats |
|---|---|---|
| Canada | | 4 |
| Canada | Montreal | 4 |
| United States | | 7 |
| United States | New York City | 7 |
| Latin America and Caribbean | | 7 |
| Antigua and Barbuda; Argentina; Bahamas; Barbados; Belize; Bolivia; Brazil; Chile; Colombia; Costa Rica; Cuba; Dominican Republic; Ecuador; Grenada; Guatemala; Guyana; Haiti; Honduras; Jamaica; Mexico; Nicaragua; Panama; Paraguay; Peru; Saint Kitts and Nevis; Saint Lucia; Saint Vincent and the Grenadines; El Salvador; Surinam; Trinidad and Tobago; Uruguay; Venezuela | São Paulo | 7 |
| Northern Europe | | 8 |
| Denmark; Estonia; Finland; Ireland; Iceland; Latvia; Lithuania; Norway; United Kingdom; Sweden | London | 8 |
| Benelux | | 6 |
| Belgium; Luxembourg; Netherlands | Brussels | 6 |
| Germany-Austria-Slovakia-Slovenia-Switzerland | | 11 |
| Germany; Austria; Slovakia; Slovenia; Switzerland | Geneva | 11 |
| Central and Eastern Europe | | 3 |
| Albania; Armenia; Belarus; Bosnia and Herzegovina; Bulgaria; Croatia; Georgia; Hungary; Kosovo; North Macedonia; Moldova; Montenegro; Poland; Romania; Russia; Serbia; Czech Republic; Ukraine | Warsaw | 3 |
| Southern Europe | | 5 |
| Cyprus; Italy; Greece; Malta; Monaco; Turkey; Vatican | Rome | 5 |
| Iberian Peninsula | | 6 |
| Andorra; Spain; Portugal | Madrid | 6 |
| North Africa | | 7 |
| Algeria; Egypt; Libya; Morocco; Tunisia | Casablanca | 7 |
| Western Africa | | 4 |
| Benin; Burkina Faso; Cape Verde; Côte d'Ivoire; Gambia; Ghana; Guinea; Guinea Bissau; Liberia; Mali; Mauritania; Niger; Senegal; Sierra Leone; Togo | Dakar | 4 |
| Central, Southern, and Eastern Africa | | 5 |
| South Africa; Angola; Botswana; Burundi; Cameroon; Central African Republic; Comoros; Republic of the Congo; Democratic Republic of the Congo; Djibouti; Eritrea; Ethiopia; Gabon; Equatorial Guinea; Kenya; Lesotho; Madagascar; Malawi; Mauritius; Mozambique; Namibia; Nigeria; Uganda; Rwanda; São Tomé and Príncipe; Seychelles; Somalia; Sudan; South Sudan; Swaziland; Tanzania; Chad; Zambia; Zimbabwe | Libreville | 5 |
| Central Asia and Middle East | | 4 |
| Afghanistan; Saudi Arabia; Azerbaijan; Bahrain; United Arab Emirates; Iraq; Iran; Jordan; Kazakhstan; Kyrgyzstan; Kuwait; Lebanon; Oman; Uzbekistan; Qatar; Pakistan; Syria; Tajikistan; Turkmenistan; Yemen | Dubai | 4 |
| Israel and Palestine | | 4 |
| Israel; Palestine | Tel Aviv | 4 |
| Asia and Oceania | | 9 |
| Australia; Bangladesh; Burma; Brunei; Cambodia; China; South Korea; North Korea; Fiji; India; Indonesia; Japan; Kiribati; Laos; Malaysia; Maldives; Marshall Islands; Federated States of Micronesia; Mongolia; Nauru; Nepal; New Zealand; Palau; Papua New Guinea; Philippines; Solomon Islands; Samoa; Singapore; Sri Lanka; Taiwan; Tonga; Thailand; East Timor; Tuvalu; Vanuatu; Vietnam | Hong Kong | 9 |

== Composition ==
Members organize themselves into political groups. A minimum of 10 members is required to form a group. The assembly currently consists of five groups.

Composition of the Assembly of French Citizens Abroad
| Group | Members |
|---|---|
| Ecology and solidarity (ES) | 30 |
| Solidarity and independents (SI) | 14 |
| Independents, democrats, and progressists (IDP) | 29 |
| Union of republicans, centers, and independents (URCI) | 15 |
| Not appearing on the list of any group (NI) | 2 |
| Total | 90 |

== See also ==
- French diaspora
- Senate of France
- National Assembly of France
- List of senators of French citizens living abroad
- List of diaspora organizations
