= List of senators of Isère =

Representatives of French department in the Senate

Location of Isère in France

Following is a list of senators of Isère, people who have represented the department of Isère in the Senate of France.

== Third Republic ==
Senators for Isère under the French Third Republic were:

| Period | Name | Notes |
|---|---|---|
| 1876–1879 | Marc-Antoine Brillier | |
| 1876–1879 | Joseph Eymard-Duvernay | |
| 1876–1879 | François Michal-Ladichère | |
| 1879–1888 | Joseph Eymard-Duvernay | |
| 1879–1888 | François Michal-Ladichère | Died 16 October 1884 |
| 1879–1888 | Joseph Marion de Faverges | Replaced François Michal-Ladichère. |
| 1879–1888 | Abel-Antoine Ronjat | Resigned 25 November 1884 |
| 1879–1888 | Jean Couturier | Replaced Abel-Antoine Ronjat |
| 1888–1897 | Jean Couturier | Died 16 August 1894 |
| 1888–1897 | Mathias Saint-Romme | Replaced Jean Couturier |
| 1888–1897 | Joseph Marion de Faverges | Died 1 December 1890 |
| 1888–1897 | Léonce-Émile Durand-Savoyat | Replaced Joseph Marion de Faverges |
| 1888–1897 | Édouard Rey | |
| 1897–1906 | Antonin Dubost | |
| 1897–1906 | Léonce-Émile Durand-Savoyat | Died 17 May 1903 |
| 1897–1906 | Gustave Rivet | Replaced Léonce-Émile Durand-Savoyat |
| 1897–1906 | Édouard Rey | Died 3 April 1901 |
| 1897–1906 | Camille Jouffray | Replaced Édouard Rey |
| 1897–1906 | Mathias Saint-Romme | Replaced Antoine Théry, irremovable senator who died on 28 December 1896; Saint-Romme thus became the 4th senator of Isère. |
| 1906–1920 | Antonin Dubost | |
| 1906–1920 | Camille Jouffray | |
| 1906–1920 | Gustave Rivet | |
| 1906–1920 | Mathias Saint-Romme | |
| 1920–1924 | Antonin Dubost | Died 15 April 1921 |
| 1920–1924 | Claude Rajon | Replaced Antonin Dubost |
| 1920–1924 | Léon Perrier | |
| 1920–1924 | Gustave Rivet | |
| 1920–1924 | Joseph Vallier | |
| 1924–1933 | Joseph Brenier | |
| 1924–1933 | Léon Perrier | |
| 1924–1933 | Claude Rajon | [Died 3 October 1932, not replaced |
| 1924–1933 | Joseph Vallier | |
| 1933–1941 | Robert Belmont | |
| 1933–1941 | Léon Perrier | |
| 1933–1941 | Joseph Serlin | |
| 1933–1941 | Joseph Vallier | Died 26 August 1935 |
| 1933–1941 | Joseph Paganon | Replaced Joseph Vallier; Died 2 November 1937 |
| 1933–1941 | Louis Guyonnet | Replaced Joseph Paganon |

== Fourth Republic ==
Senators for Isère under the French Fourth Republic were:

| Period | Name | Party |
|---|---|---|
| 1946–1948 | Claude Naime | French Communist Party (PCF) |
| 1946–1948 | Jean Novat | Popular Republican Movement (MRP) |
| 1946–1948 | Alfred Paget | French Section of the Workers' International (SFIO) |
| 1948–1955 | Jean Berthoin | Rally of Republican Lefts |
| 1948–1955 | Jean Novat | Popular Republican Movement (MRP) |
| 1948–1955 | Alfred Paget | French Section of the Workers' International (SFIO) |
| 1955–1959 | Jean Berthoin | Radical Party (PRRRS) |
| 1955–1959 | Jean-Baptiste Dufeu | Radical Party (PRRRS) |
| 1955–1959 | Paul Mistral | French Section of the Workers' International (SFIO) |

== Fifth Republic ==
Senators for Isère under the French Fifth Republic:

| Period | Name | Party or group | Notes |
|---|---|---|---|
| 1959–1965 | Jean Berthoin | Gauche démocratique (GD) | |
| 1959–1965 | Jean-Baptiste Dufeu | Gauche démocratique (GD) | |
| 1959–1965 | Paul Mistral | French Section of the Workers' International (SFIO) | |
| 1965–1974 | Jean Berthoin | Gauche démocratique (GD) | |
| 1965–1974 | Jean-Baptiste Dufeu | Gauche démocratique (GD) | |
| 1965–1974 | Paul Mistral | Socialist Party (PS) | |
| 1974–1983 | Paul Jargot | French Communist Party (PCF) | |
| 1974–1983 | Paul Mistral | Socialist Party (PS) | Died 29 August 1981 |
| 1974–1983 | Raymond Espagnac | | Replaced Paul Mistral |
| 1974–1983 | Pierre Perrin | none | |
| 1983–1992 | Jean Boyer | Union for French Democracy (UDF); Republican Party (PR) | |
| 1983–1992 | Guy-Pierre Cabanel | Union for French Democracy (UDF); Republican Party (PR) | |
| 1983–1992 | Charles Descours | Rally for the Republic (RPR) | |
| 1983–1992 | Jean Faure | Union for French Democracy (UDF); Centre of Social Democrats (CDS) | |
| 1992–2001 | Jean Boyer | Union for French Democracy (UDF); Republican Party (PR) | |
| 1992–2001 | Guy-Pierre Cabanel | Union for French Democracy (UDF); Republican Party (PR) | |
| 1992–2001 | Charles Descours | Rally for the Republic (RPR) | |
| 1992–2001 | Jean Faure | Union for French Democracy (UDF); Centre of Social Democrats (CDS) | |
| 2001–2011 | Annie David | French Communist Party (PCF) | |
| 2001–2011 | Jean Faure | Union for a Popular Movement (UMP) | |
| 2001–2011 | Louis Mermaz | Socialist Party (PS) | |
| 2001–2011 | Bernard Saugey | Union for a Popular Movement (UMP) | |
| 2011–2017 | Jacques Chiron | Socialist Party (PS) | |
| 2011–2017 | Annie David | French Communist Party (PCF) | |
| 2011–2017 | Bernard Saugey | Union for a Popular Movement (UMP) | |
| 2011–2017 | Michel Savin | Union for a Popular Movement (UMP) | |
| 2011–2017 | André Vallini | Socialist Party (PS) | Named to cabinet in May 2014; Returned to senate June 2017 |
| 2011–2017 | Éliane Giraud | Socialist Party (PS) | Replaced André Vallini May 2014 to June 2017 |
| 2017–2023 | Didier Rambaud | La République En Marche! (REM) | |
| 2017–2023 | Guillaume Gontard | Miscellaneous left (DVG) | |
| 2017–2023 | Frédérique Puissat | The Republicans (LR) | |
| 2017–2023 | Michel Savin | The Republicans (LR) | |
| 2017–2023 | André Vallini | Socialist Party (PS) | 2011–2014, 2017 |

== Sources ==
- Liste des anciens sénateurs de la IIIème République par circonscription (in French), Sénat de France
- Liste des anciens sénateurs de la IVème République par circonscription (in French), Sénat de France
- Liste des anciens sénateurs de la Vème République par circonscription (in French), Sénat de France
- Liste par département - Isère (in French), Sénat de France
