= Company union =

Trade/labor union which is dominated or influenced by an employer

ILGWU Local 22 Anti-Zimmerman Cartoon

A company or "yellow" union is a worker organization which is dominated or unduly influenced by an employer and is therefore not an independent trade union. Company unions are contrary to international labour law (see ILO Convention 98, Article 2). They were outlawed in the United States by the 1935 National Labor Relations Act §8(a)(2), due to their use as agents for interference with independent unions. However, company unions persist in many countries.

Some labour organizations are accused by rival unions of behaving as "company unions" if they are seen as having too close or congenial a relationship with the employer or with business associations, and even if they may be formally recognized in their respective jurisdictions as bona fide trade unions, they are usually rejected as such by regional and national trade union centres. In a study of one such organisation, this form of company union was observed to rarely or never strike, exert relatively little energy in resolving individual workplace disputes, and undercut other unions by bargaining for well beneath industry-standard terms, and was characterised thus:

"[...] an accommodationist, or 'company,' union—an opportunistic, pariah organization that allows employers who would otherwise face a 'real' union (i.e., traditional, militant) a convenient union-avoidance alternative."

== International law ==
A "company union" is generally recognized as being an organization that is not freely elected by the workforce, and over which an employer exerts some form of control. The International Labour Organization defines a company union as "A union limited to a single company which dominates or strongly influences it, thereby limiting its influence." Under the ILO Right to Organise and Collective Bargaining Convention, 1949 (No. 98) Article 2 effectively prohibits any form of company union. It reads as follows:

1. Workers' and employers' organisations shall enjoy adequate protection against any acts of interference by each other or each other's agents or members in their establishment, functioning or administration.

2. In particular, acts which are designed to promote the establishment of workers' organisations under the domination of employers or employers' organisations, or to support workers' organisations by financial or other means, with the object of placing such organisations under the control of employers or employers' organisations, shall be deemed to constitute acts of interference within the meaning of this Article.

== National laws ==
=== France ===
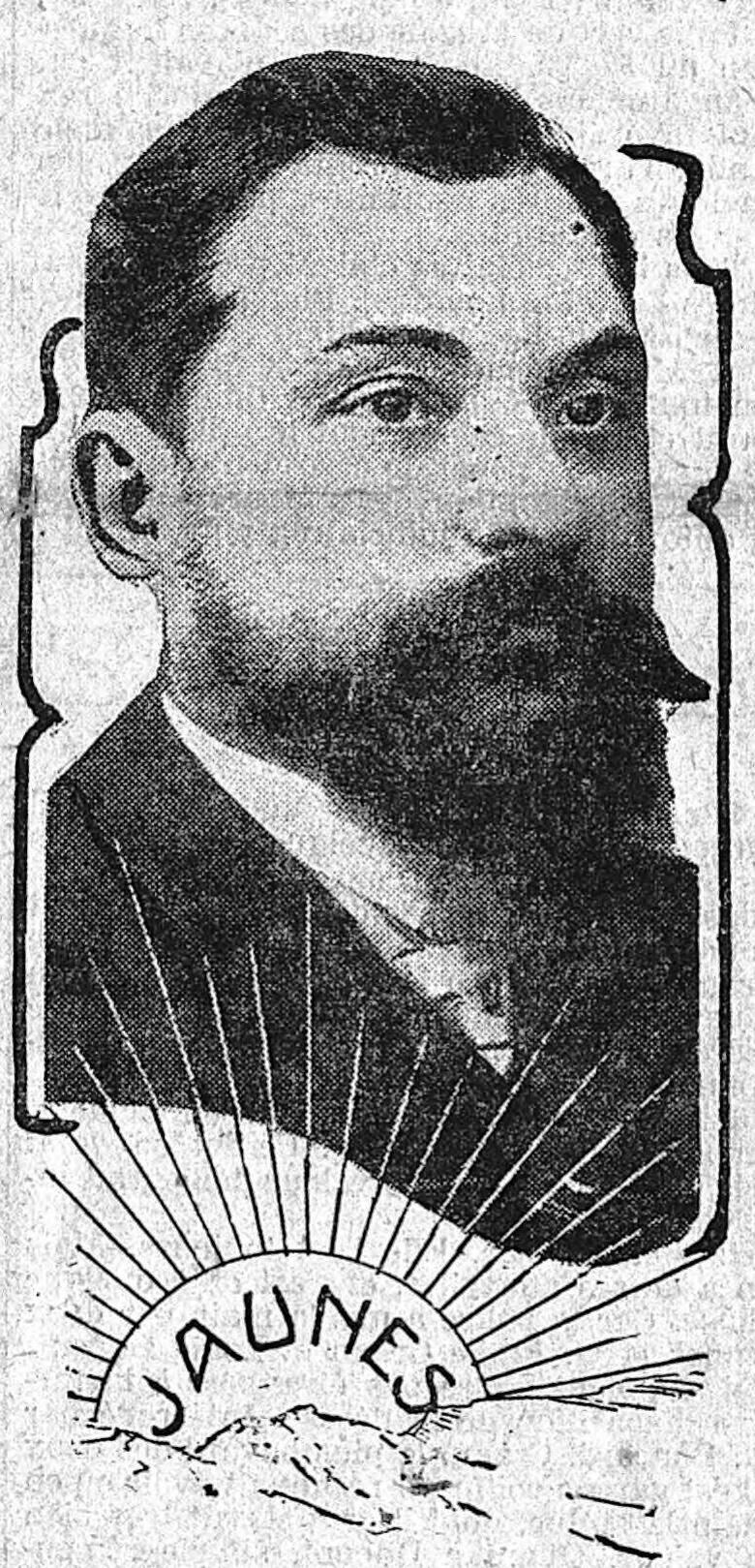
Pierre Biétry, founder of the Fédération nationale des Jaunes de France, in 1908

The first yellow union in France, the Fédération nationale des Jaunes de France ("National Federation of the Yellows of France") was created by Pierre Biétry in 1902. The yellow color was deliberately chosen in opposition to the red color associated with socialism. Yellow unions, in opposition to red unions such as the Confédération Générale du Travail, rejected class struggle and favored the collaboration of capital and labor, and were opposed to strikes. According to Zeev Sternhell, the yellow union of Biétry had a membership of about a third of that of the Confédération Générale du Travail, and was funded by corporate interests. Moreover, also according to Sternhell, there were close relationships between Pierre Biétry and Maurice Barrès and the Action Française, making the yellow union of Biétry a precursor of fascist corporatism. During the Nazi occupation of France, unions were banned and replaced by corporations organized along the fascist model by the Vichy Regime. The labor secretary of Philippe Pétain's administration from 1940 to 1942 was René Belin. After the war, René Belin was involved in 1947 with the creation of the Confédération du Travail indépendant (CTI), renamed Confédération Générale des Syndicats Indépendants (CGSI) in 1949 as the original acronym was already used by Confédération des Travailleurs intellectuels. The movement was joined by former members of the Confédération des syndicats professionnels français, a union created by François de La Rocque in 1936. The CGSI declared that it was formed by "des hommes d’origine et de formation différentes [qui] se sont trouvés d’accord pour dénoncer la malfaisance de la CGT communisée" (men of different origins who agreed to denounce the malfeasance of the communist CGT). CGSI developed mostly in the automobile industry, for instance in the Simca factory of Poissy.

In 1959, the CGSI became the Confédération Française du Travail (CFT), led by Jacques Simakis. It was declared a representative union on January 7, 1959, but the decision was overturned by the State Council on April 11, 1962, following a lawsuit by the Confédération Française des Travailleurs Chrétiens (CFTC) based on the funding of CFT by companies. In 1968, it organized demonstrations for the "freedom to work" to oppose the strikes organized by the CGT. In September 1975, Simakis resigned and denounced the links of CFT with the Service d'Action Civique. On June 4, 1977, a commando formed by members of the CFT-Citroën opened fire on strikers at the Verreries mécaniques champenoises in Reims (then directed by Maurice Papon) in a drive-by shooting, killing Pierre Maître, a member of the CGT. Two other members of the CGT were injured. Following this incident, the CFT changed its name into Confédération des Syndicats Libres (CSL). In the continuity of the company union of Biétry, the CSL is in favor of the association of capital and labor, is opposed to Marxism and collectivism, and denounces the French Communist Party as a civil war machine. The number of adherents of CSL was never published, but in professional elections, it obtained from 2% to 4% of the votes. In October 2002, the CSL disappeared as a national union as a result of lack of funds. It called its supporters to join the Force Ouvrière union in the professional elections. In the automobile industry, the CSL remains as the Syndicat Indépendant de l'Automobile (Independent Automobile Workers' Union).

=== United States ===
Company unions were common in the United States during the early twentieth century, but were outlawed under the 1935 National Labor Relations Act § 8(a)(2) so that trade unions could remain independent of management. All labor organizations would have to be freely elected by the workforce, without interference.

In 1914, 16 miners and family members (and one national guardsman) were killed when the Colorado National Guard attacked a tent colony of striking coal miners in Ludlow, Colorado. This event, known as the Ludlow massacre, was a major public relations debacle for mine owners, and one of them—John D. Rockefeller Jr.—hired labor-relations expert and former Canadian Minister of Labour William Lyon Mackenzie King to suggest ways to improve the tarnished image of his company, Colorado Fuel and Iron. One of the elements of the Rockefeller Plan was to form a union, known as the Employee Representation Plan (ERP), based inside the company itself. The ERP allowed workers to elect representatives, who would then meet with company officials to discuss grievances.

In 1933 the miners voted to be represented by the UMW, ending the ERP at Colorado Fuel and Iron. Company unions, however, continued to operate at other mines in Pueblo, Colorado and Wyoming, and the ERP model was being used by numerous other companies. (The Brotherhood of Sleeping Car Porters was organized in part to combat the company union at the Pullman Company.)

In 1935, the National Labor Relations Act (also known as the Wagner Act) was passed, dramatically changing labor law in the United States. Section 8(a)(2) of the NLRA makes it illegal for an employer "to dominate or interfere with the formation or administration of any labor organization or contribute financial or other support to it." Company unions were considered illegal under this code, despite the efforts of some businesses to carry on under the guise of an "Employee Representation Organization" (ERO).

In the mid-20th century, managers of high-tech industry like Robert Noyce (who co-founded Fairchild Semiconductor in 1957 and Intel in 1968) worked to rid their organizations of union interference. "Remaining non-union is an essential for survival for most of our companies," Noyce once said. "If we had the work rules that unionized companies have, we'd all go out of business."

One way of forestalling unions while obeying the Wagner Act was the introduction of "employee involvement (EI) programs" and other in-house job-cooperation groups. One company included them in their "Intel values," cited by employees as reasons why they didn't need a union. With workers integrated (at least on a project level) into the decision-making structure, the independent union is seen by some as an anachronism. Pat Hill-Hubbard, senior vice-president of the American Electronics Association, said in 1994: "Unions as they have existed in the past are no longer relevant. Labor law of 40 years ago is not appropriate to 20th century economics." Author David Bacon calls EI programs "the modern company union".

In 1995, pursuant to a report from the Commission on the Future of Worker-Management Relations, Republicans in the U.S. Congress introduced and voted for the Teamwork for Employees and Managers Act of 1995 (known as the "TEAM Act"). The bill would have weakened federal regulations against employer establishment and control of employee involvement programs. Although the bill indicated that EI plans should not be used specifically to discredit or prevent union organization, trade unions in the United States vehemently opposed the bill. Jim Wood, an AFL–CIO leader in Los Angeles, said the "Team Act actually would take us backward to the days of company unions." President Bill Clinton vetoed the bill on 30 July 1996.

Calls to legalize company unions are rare, but New York University law professor Richard Epstein, in an opinion piece published in The Wall Street Journal on September 11, 2018, called for the repeal of Section 8(a)(2) of the NLRA.

=== China ===
Trade unions in the People's Republic of China are often identified as government unions, by virtue of their frequent close relationship with national planning bodies. Although the reform and opening up is changing the relationship between workers and the All-China Federation of Trade Unions (China's sole national trade federation), critics such as U.S. presidential candidate and activist Ralph Nader maintain they are "government-controlled with the Chinese communist party turning them into what would be called 'company unions' in the U.S."

=== Russia ===
In many Post-Soviet states, including the Russian Federation, the economic collapse of the early 1990s brought a sharp decline in labor activity. As a result, official union structures often function as de facto company unions.

=== Japan ===
Company unions are a mainstay of labor organization in Japan, viewed with much less animosity than in Europe or the United States. Unaffiliated with RENGO (the largest Japanese trade union federation), company unions appeal to both the lack of class consciousness in Japanese society and the drive for social status, which is often characterized by loyalty to one's employer.

=== Hong Kong ===
The Hong Kong Federation of Trade Unions (HKFTU), as both a political party and a federations of different trade unions in Hong Kong, has been adapting a political stand which are mostly inclined to the Hong Kong and Beijing Government. Therefore, HKFTU is sometimes classified as a company union, and a Pro-Beijing political party.

=== Mexico ===
In the 1930s, unions in Mexico organized the Confederation of Mexican Workers (Confederación de Trabajadores de México, CTM). The state of Nuevo Leon, however, coordinated its workers into sindicatos blancos ("white unions"), company unions controlled by corporations in the industrialized region.

=== Guatemala ===
In 1997, the government of Guatemala received a loan for 13 million USD from the World Bank to privatize its seaport, electrical grid, and telephone and postal services. Canada Post International Limited (CPIL), a subsidiary of Canada Post, and its partner International Postal Services (IPS), was contracted to manage the privatization process. In anticipation of union resistance, CPIL-IPS agents reportedly used company unions, along with bribery and death threats, to ensure a smooth transition.

Company unions are also prevalent among the maquiladoras in Guatemala.

== Theory ==
Supporters of independent trade unions contend that company unions face a conflict of interest, as they are less likely to propose large-scale pro-worker changes to employment contracts—such as overtime rules and salary schedules—than independent unions. At least one economist advances the idea that in the first part of the 20th century, many companies were hesitant to adopt the company union model for fear that it might lead to support for an independent trade union. A 2002 World Bank publication cites research from Malaysia and India which produced conflicting results as to the wage differential provided by trade unions compared to company unions. Malaysia saw improved wages through independent unions, while India did not. The authors indicate the latter "may reflect the specific circumstances that prevailed in Bombay at the time of the study." Marcel van der Linden states that company unions are "heteronomous trade unions that never or rarely organize strikes" and are mainly established to "keep 'industrial peace' and prevent autonomous trade unions."

Proponents of company unions claim they are more efficient in responding to worker grievances than independent trade unions. Proponents also note that independent trade unions do not necessarily have the company's best interests at heart; company unions are designed to resolve disputes within the framework of maximum organizational (not just company) profitability. For example, economist Leo Wolman wrote in 1924: "[T]he distinction ... between trade unions and other workmen's associations is frequently a vague and changing one. What is today a company union may tomorrow have all of the characteristics of a trade union."

In their wide-ranging 2017 study of the Canadian company union CLAC, geographer Steven Tufts and sociologist Mark Thomas draw a distinction between multiple categories of organisation commonly called "company unions", arguing that it is a mistake to regard the company union phenomenon as purely or essentially pro-business and anti-worker (or necessarily beholden to any specific business), and that rather they should be seen as occupying one end of a spectrum of possible relationships between business and labour: the "accommodationist" end. A defining feature of "accommodationist" or company unionism is that it "seek[s] compromise with employers and capital in the first instance", that is to say, it holds a priori that workers are not generally in competition with employers, and should not organise to take action in spite of, or demand significant concessions from, employers in order to achieve better employment conditions. They "explicitly advocate for collaborative relationships with employers and disparage conflict as a means of achieving gains for workers from the outset."

Though all trade unions do in fact compromise with employers as a matter of arriving at collective agreements, the accommodationist attitude more broadly, and the company union as a specific adoption of that attitude, maintains that workers should not exert any strictly independent collective agency with regard to their employment. This insistence against the legitimacy of independent worker agency often extends beyond the confines of the workplace, and company or accommodationist unions often seek to dispute the legitimacy of the trade union movement as a political movement at large. This brings them into conflict with traditional trade unions in multiple ways; because these aim to organise workers democratically at their jobs in order to pursue their own collective self-interest, as distinct and separate from the interests of the employer; and doubly because traditional trade unions often view workers' struggles as interrelated with broader social-political struggles, and encourage unionised workers to see themselves in solidarity with one another and with broader struggles for justice in society.

In particular, because accommodationist or company unions therefore have no intrinsic means of contesting for the rights and wellbeing of workers beyond what the employer is simply willing to offer (since they don't believe in striking for demands), and beyond what the law already provides for or guarantees (since they don't believe that unions should campaign or lobby for political change or mount legal action), this conflict with "real" unions is not merely ideological, but necessarily practical as well: accommodationist unions organise in direct opposition to existing autonomous trade unions, and generally seek to expand by raiding their shops and locals, with the often explicit goal of supplanting them as the "official" or preferred union recognised by the employer to represent workers, thus setting themselves up as eventual company unions proper. This aggressive practice they then rationalise via recourse to the same accommodationist theory and rhetoric: according to the logic of accommodationism, traditional militant trade unions can be said to have no one but themselves to blame if an employer would rather bargain with a company union than with one which organises worker power to fight for gains.

== See also ==
- US labor law
- UK labour law
- Employers Group, which, as the Merchants and Manufacturers Association, promoted company unions in California
