= Jacques Rougeot =

French literary critic and political activist (1938–2021)

President of the Initiative and Liberty Movement
- In office 1981–1986
- Preceded by: position established
- Succeeded by: André Decocq

President of Union Nationale Inter-universitaire
- In office 1969–2009
- Preceded by: René Deheuvels
- Succeeded by: Olivier Vial

Personal details
- Born: 13 June 1938 France
- Died: 19 July 2021 (aged 83) France
- Party: RPR

Jacques Rougeot (French: [ʒak ʁuʒo]; 13 June 1938 – 19 July 2021) was a French literary critic and political activist.

== Biography ==
After earning a doctorate in literature in 1978, Rougeot was a French professor at Paris-Sorbonne University. He was one of the founders and served as President of Union Nationale Inter-universitaire from 1969 to 2009. He was also founding President of the Initiative and Liberty Movement.

During the 1980s, Rougeot wrote for the Club de l'Horloge's newspaper, Contrepoint. He directed the "thèse de Nantes", which was cancelled in 1986 before he was replaced at the helm by Jean-Claude Rivière.

Jacques Rougeot died on 19 July 2021 at the age of 83.

== Distinctions ==
- Knight of the Legion of Honour (1997)

== Books ==
- La Contre-Offensive (1974)
- Socialisme à responsabilité limitée : le roi est nu (1981)
- La Voie droite (1989)
- UNI : 40 ans de combats, 40 affiches (2009)
- Ah ! Laissez-nous respirer ! : contre la censure des bien-pensants (2010)
