= Service d'Action Civique =

Gaullist militia

The SAC (French: Service d'Action Civique; or Civic Action Service), officially created in January 1960, was a Gaullist militia founded by Jacques Foccart, Charles de Gaulle's chief adviser for African matters, and Pierre Debizet, a former Resistant and official director of the group. Important members included Charles Pasqua, part of the Gaullist movement and known as Jacques Chirac's mentor, Etienne Léandri, a friend of Pasqua, Robert Pandraud or Christian Fouchet. The predecessor of the SAC was the service of order of the Rassemblement du Peuple Français (RPF) Gaullist party. The SAC was dissolved in 1982 under François Mitterrand's government, after a particularly gruesome multiple murder triggered by internal rivalries.

== Foundation during the Algerian War ==
The SAC was officially created as a 1901 law association on 4 January 1960, in the proclaimed aim of providing unconditional support to de Gaulle's policy. It was then officially directed by Pierre Debizet, a former Resistant, but its real leader was Jacques Foccart, in charge of the African policy of France for several decades.

The SAC recruited among the Gaullist movement, but also in the organized crime. Etienne Léandri, a friend of Charles Pasqua, was thus a former Collaborationist, reconverted in illegal drug trade and protected by the Central Intelligence Agency for his anti-communist activities. Others famous gangsters of the time who were SAC members include Jo Attia or Christian David ("le beau Serge"). Some of these criminals had taken part in the Resistance during the war, and even been deported, thus creating lasting links with future politicians, while others had been collaborationists.

The SAC always was independent from the Gaullist party itself, directly reporting to General de Gaulle through Foccart. The Parliamentary report published in 1982 talked of "God without the clergy" ("bon dieu sans les curés").

After de Gaulle's change of policy concerning the Algerian War (1954-1962) and his subsequent support of Algerian independence, many SAC members, supporters or outright activists of "French Algeria" resigned. Pierre Debizet, official director of the SAC, was replaced by Paul Comiti, a bodyguard of de Gaulle. General de Gaulle then sent the SAC against the Organisation armée secrète' (OAS) terrorist group which launched a campaign of bombings and assassinations to try to block the implementation of the March 1962 Evian agreements on a cease-fire with the National Liberation Front (FLN).

== 1960s: May 1968 and the "disappearance" of Mehdi Ben Barka ==
After this period, which saw the longtime Gaullists quit the organisation, the SAC began to recruit more and more from underworld groups. It then became involved in all sorts of shady moves and covert actions for the Gaullist party. It has been suspected of participating in 1965 in the "disappearance" in Paris of Mehdi Ben Barka, leader of the Moroccan opposition to King Hassan II and of the Tricontinental Conference. Furthermore, Jacqueline Hémard and Ali Bourequat, "disappeared" under Hassan II, have accused the SAC of financing itself by drug trade with Morocco.

During May 1968, SAC members, disguised as ambulance crew, took demonstrators to their headquarters, rue de Solférino, where they were beaten up. They then prepared the Gaullist counter-demonstration which assured de Gaulle of the support of (parts of) the French people. After the June 1968 legislative election, the SAC expelled from the Youth Centres ("Maisons des Jeunes") various movements and associations, including the Maoists and the so-called "Katangais". Continuing this "policy of order", the SAC created in 1969 the right-wing students' union Union Nationale Inter-universitaire (UNI) in 1969 to counter the "leftist subversion" in the students' movement. Until 1976, the SAC supported the UNI in daily organisation, while many UNI members were also SAC members. Double membership of most activists continued after 1976, but the two organisations had distinct leadership.

Jacques Foccart called back Pierre Debizet to the head of the SAC during May 1968. Foccart excluded Charles Pasqua in the beginning of 1969, suspecting him of trying to take control of the militia. Furthermore, Pierre Debizet decided to change the membership card, which looked too much like a police card, and requested from each member an extract of his judicial record. Despite this cleaning-up of the organisation in 1968-69, SAC members have had problems with the law between 1968 and 1981 for various reasons, including: "assault (coups et blessures volontaires), illegal possession of fire-arms, fraud, aggravated assault, money counterfeiting, pimping, racketeering, arson, blackmail, illegal drug trade, holdup, abuse of trust (abus de confiance - i.e. corruption), bombings like during the Besançon courthouse attack, robberies and handling, being a member of a criminal organisation (association de malfaiteurs), degradation of vehicles, use of stolen cheques, outrage to public morality (outrage aux bonnes mœurs)."

Some SAC members have upheld a theory of the "two SAC" to defend themselves, alleging the coexistence, under the same appellation, of on one hand a group of staunchly right-wing Gaullist activists, often recruiting honourable persons (a magistrate, a certain number of workers' activists often linked to "yellow trade-unions" such as the CGSI, the CFT or the CSL), and on the other hand individuals located at the cross-roads between intelligence activities, organized crime and far right movements, used for the most shady actions.

In the 1970s, journalist Patrice Chairoff published in Libération left-wing newspaper, founded by Jean-Paul Sartre and others, a plan of the SAC envisioning the internment of leftists in stadiums. The document was attributed to the Marseillese Gérard Kappé, a lieutenant of Charles Pasqua who claimed it was a forgery. Chairoff was the pseudonym of Dominique Calzi, a far-right activist and criminal, who had been a member of the SAC until quitting in 1971.

One of the main roles of the SAC, although not well known, was the internal surveillance of the Gaullist party. The departmental responsible of the SAC was a de jure member of the departmental committee of the Union des Démocrates pour la République (UNR), then of the Union des Démocrates pour la République (UDR) and Rally for the Republic (RPR) (successive incarnations of the Gaullist party), even though he was often not an adherent of the Gaullist party. It is through this tight network covering France that Jacques Foccart was very well informed. On many times, the notes communicated to Pierre Debizet by his departmental responsibles permitted to push out of the Gaullist party elected (or not) officials of the party suspected of some illegal activities, before having the French justice take care of it.

According to Daniele Ganser (2005), the SAC had Jacques Chirac as president in 1975. He later was twice prime minister before being elected president in 1995.

== 1981 Auriol massacre and the dissolving of the SAC ==
Pierre Debizet, national leader of the SAC, arrived in Marseille in May 1981, troubled by local rivalries within his organisation. Jacques Massié, a police inspector and the local leader of the SAC, was accused by those who later would assassinate him of corruption — and worse, of contacts with the left. He was in reality a competent police officer, who was to take the leadership of the SAC in the Bouches-du-Rhône with the support of Debizet. Some time afterward, Massié and all of his family were massacred on the night of July 18, 1981 in what is known as the "Auriol massacre". His murderers were arrested a few weeks later. Pierre Debizet was interrogated by the police, but eventually released without charges. The five SAC members of the Auriol commando were sentenced on May 1, 1985 to between 15 years of prison and life-sentences; the mastermind behind inspector Massié's murder was never identified.

The Auriol massacre took place soon after the 1981 election of François Mitterrand, candidate of the Socialist Party (PS). That election was the first victory of the left-wing since the 1958 establishment of the Fifth Republic by De Gaulle. The new parliamentary majority set up a parliamentary investigative commission, in which the opposition refused to sit. That Commission did not request the dissolving of the SAC, which the National Assembly nonetheless debated. The government disbanded the SAC in 1982, using a law which allows disbanding combat groups and private militias.

== Successors of the SAC ==
After the 1982 dissolving of the SAC, Charles Pasqua, future Interior Minister, created the "Solidarité et défense des libertés" organisation ("Solidarity and Defense of Freedoms"), which gathered RPR and Union for French Democracy (UDF) members, former SAC activists and even some members of far-right movements such as the "Parti des forces nouvelles" (PFN, Party of the New Forces). This descendant of the SAC was quickly dissolved. After the 1982 bombing of the rue Marbœuf, it organised a demonstration during which activists of the Centre national des indépendants et paysans (CNIP) and of the PFN distinguished themselves.

Furthermore, Pierre Debizet created the Mouvement initiative et liberté (MIL, Movement of Initiative and Freedom) after the May 1981 presidential election, but before the dissolving of the SAC in 1982. Rather than a resurgence of the SAC, it was thus more a parallel structure of the UNI estudiantine trade-union, which was supposed to assist SAC activists in finding more mainstream, professional activities, by entering the estudiantine movement.

In the early 1980s, the SAC also had some front organisations, such as the private security firm VHP Security, which had as subsidiary KO International Company, charged of the personal security of Jean-Marie Le Pen, leader of the far-right National Front (FN). Ante Gotovina, indicted by the International Criminal Tribunal for the former Yugoslavia on charges of war crimes, had worked for KO International Company.

== In popular culture ==
- Films
  - The Day of the Jackal directed by Fred Zinnemann (1973)
  - Le Juge Fayard dit Le Shérif directed by Yves Boisset (1977)
  - J'ai vu tuer Ben Barka directed by Serge Le Péron (2005)
  - L'Affaire Ben Barka directed by Jean-Pierre Sinapi (2007)
- Manga
  - Black Lagoon (2002), featured prominently in the arc "L'homme sombre"

== Bibliography ==
- Report from the Parliamentary Commission on the SAC, Editions Alain Moreau, 1982
- François Audigier, Histoire du SAC, la part d'ombre du gaullisme, Stock, 2003
- Alex Panzani, La tuerie d'Auriol, J'ai lu, Crimes et enquètes.
- Benjamin Biale, "Le service d'action civique : 1958-1968.", Mémoire IEP Aix-en-Provence 1997
- Pierre Péan L'Homme de l'ombre: éléments d'enquête autour de Jacques Foccart, l'homme le plus mystérieux et le plus puissant de la Ve République, Fayard, 1990.

== See also ==
- François-Xavier Verschave's criticism of French neocolonialism
- Gaullism
