= CFT =

CFT may refer to:

== Chemistry ==
- (-)-2β-Carbomethoxy-3β-(4-fluorophenyl)tropane
- Cefatrizine, a cephalosporin antibiotic
- Crystal field theory, describes the breaking of degeneracies of electron orbital states

== Mathematics and physics ==
- Class field theory, a branch of algebraic number theory
- Classical field theory, electromagnetism and gravitation
- Conformal field theory, a quantum field theory that is invariant under conformal transformations
- Continuous Fourier transform

== Military ==
- Cadet Field Training, part of United States Military Academy § Cadet life
- Combat Fitness Test:
  - Combat Fitness Test, a British Army test of a soldier's lower and upper body strength, the Annual Fitness Test
  - Combat Fitness Test, a US Marine Corps test that assesses the Marine's field readiness
- Contract Field Teams, a United States Air Force designed to supplement maintenance of military assets
- Corps Féminin des Transmissions, part of the Free French forces during World War II
- United States Army Futures Command's CFTs, each a team of teams, led by a requirements leader, program manager, sustainer, tester
- Secretary of Defense-Empowered Cross-Functional Teams, specialized organizations within the DOD designed to assist it in addressing complex, cross-cutting problems and facilitating reforms

== Transport ==
- Crofton Park railway station, in London, England (National Rail station code)
- Greenlee County Airport, in Clifton, Arizona, United States (FAA code)

== Others ==
- Chichester Festival Theatre
- Combating the Financing of Terrorism, related to anti–money laundering
- Comhairle Fo-Thuinn, the national body in Ireland for recreational diving and underwater sports
- Compassion-focused therapy, a system of psychotherapy developed by Paul Gilbert
- Confédération française du travail (National Confederation of Labour), former name of the Confédération des syndicats libres a French right-wing union dissolved in 2002
- Conformal fuel tanks, additional fuel tanks fitted to an aircraft
- Cross File Transfer, a secure computer file transfer program
- Cross-functional team, a group of people with different expertise working toward a common goal
- Concrete-filled tube, a construction material
