= Caroline Abadie =

French politician of Renaissance (born 1976)

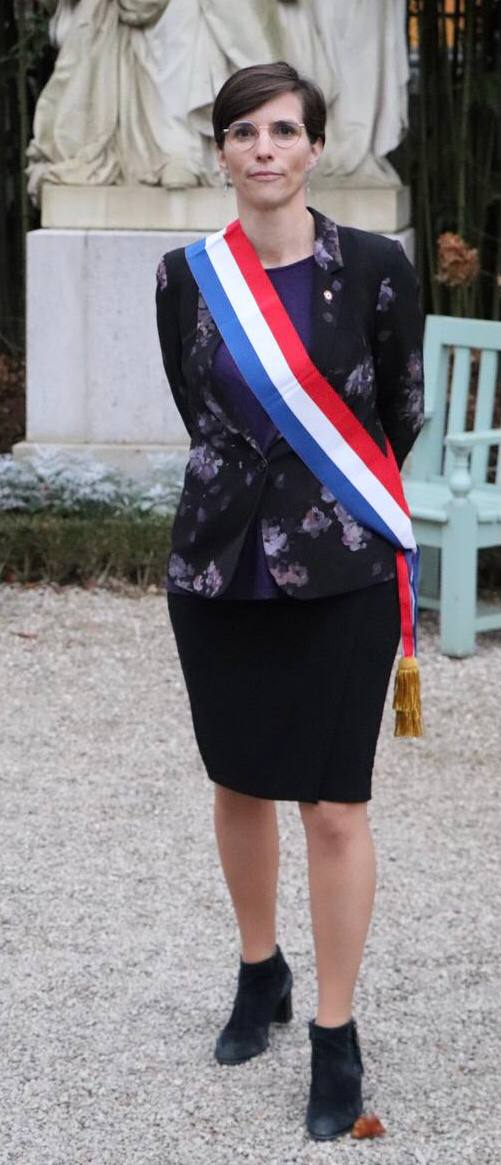

Member of the National Assembly for Isère's 8th constituency
- In office 21 June 2017 – 9 June 2024
- Preceded by: Erwann Binet
- Succeeded by: Hanane Mansouri

Personal details
- Born: 7 September 1976 (age 50) Saint-Martin-d'Hères, France
- Party: Renaissance
- Education: University of Grenoble

Caroline Abadie (born 7 September 1976) is a French politician of Renaissance (RE) who has been serving as a member of the National Assembly since the 2017 elections, representing the 8th constituency of the department of Isère.

== Early life and career ==
Caroline Abadie was born September 7, 1976, in Saint-Martin-d'Hères, Isère.

Abadie studied law, and then worked for 15 years as a recruitment consultant in the Île-de-France. In 2010, she and her husband ran a bed and breakfast in Grenay, Isère which she gave up when she ran for office.

== Political career ==
Abadie was elected to the National Assembly as a delegate for the eighth constituency of Isère in the second round of the 2017 French elections. She received 63% of the vote, beating out National Rally candidate Thibaut Monnier.

In parliament, Abadie has since been serving on the Committee on Legal Affairs.

From November 2017, Abadie was part of LREM's executive board under the leadership of the party's successive chairmen Christophe Castaner and Stanislas Guerini.

Along with Joaquim Pueyo, Abadie co-chairs the study group "Prisons and prison conditions". She also participates in the “Participatory democracy and e-democracy" and "Fight against addictions" study groups.

She was re-elected in the 2022 election.

She withdrew from the 2024 snap election after finishing third in the first round.

== Political positions ==
Abadie supports labor code reform in favor of adapting to different companies. She says that "... we can no longer have the same code for a multinational company as a company with two employees. It is too rigid." She also thinks that the National Assembly should have more entrepreneurs like herself: "It is important that it has people that put together businesses and create jobs."

In July 2019, Abadie voted in favor of the French ratification of the European Union's Comprehensive Economic and Trade Agreement (CETA) with Canada.
