= Biancheri =

Biancheri is a surname of French or Italian origin. Notable people with the surname include:

- Franck Biancheri (minister) (born 1960), former foreign minister of Monaco
- Franck Biancheri (1961–2012), French politician
- Gabriel Biancheri (1943–2010), French politician
- Henri Biancheri (1932–2019), French footballer
- Admiral Luigi Biancheri (1891–1950), Italian naval commander during Operation Abstention in the Mediterranean in 1941
- Raoul Biancheri, Chancellor of several Orders of Monaco
