= Isère departmental council =

French departmental council

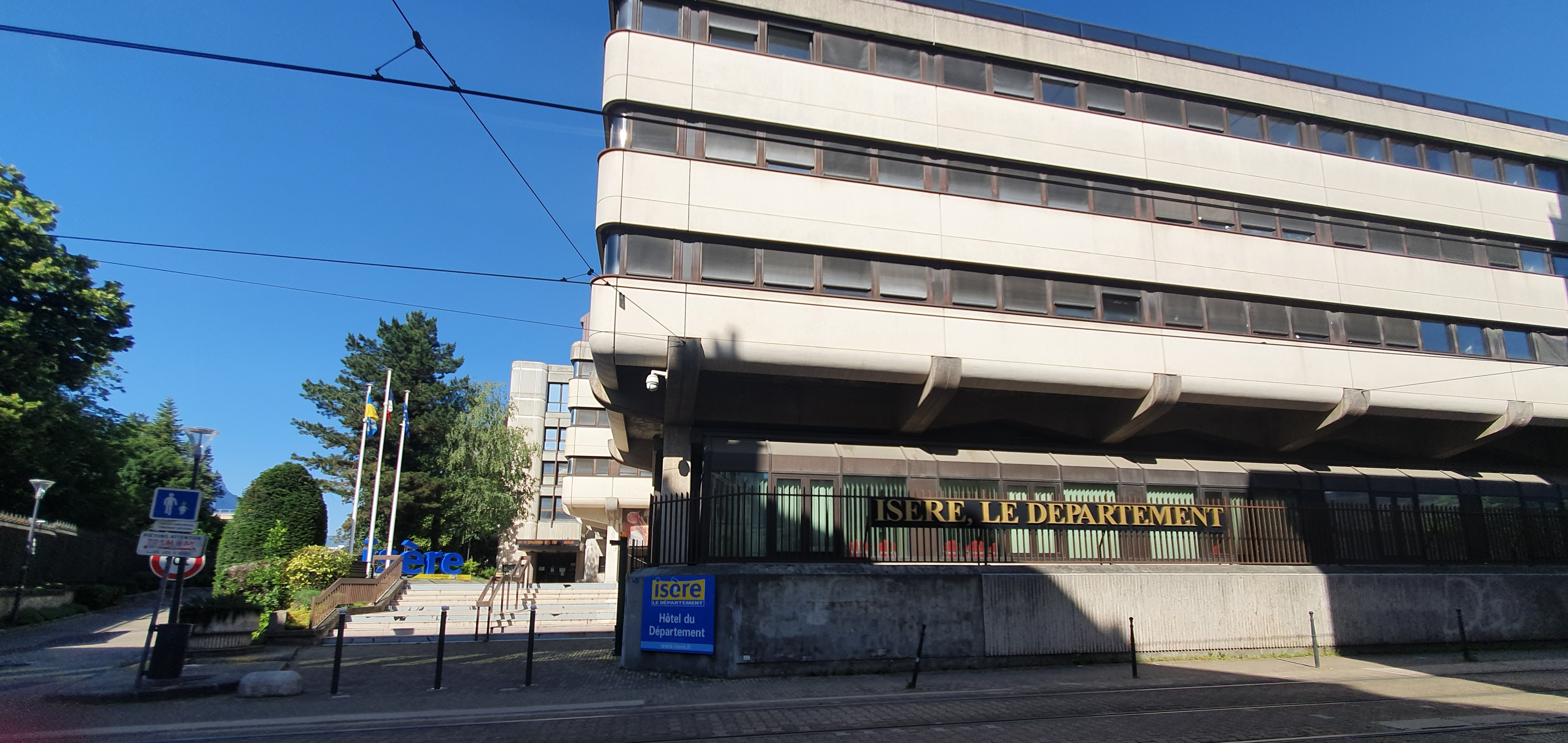

The Isère Departmental Council is the deliberative assembly of the French department of Isère, a decentralized territorial collectivity. Formerly known as the "Conseil Général", it was renamed the "Conseil Départemental" in 2015.

Its headquarters are on rue Fantin-Latour in Grenoble, close to Verdun, which houses the Isère prefecture building. The nearest tramway stations are Verdun - Préfecture (line A) and Chavant (lines A and C).

== Elected representatives ==
=== President ===
==== Between 1790 and 1940 ====
- Jean-Baptiste Annibal Aubert du Bayet (1790-1791):;
- Jacques Falquet-Planta (1791-1793) (Falquet de Planta family);
- The law of 14 frimaire an II (December 4, 1793) abolished the general councils. They were re-established by the law of 28 pluviôse an VIII (February 17, 1800);
- Joseph Falquet-Planta (1800-1804) (Falquet de Planta family);
- Jacques Revol (1804-1810);
- Louis Royer (1810-1814);
- Joseph Pasquier (1814-1816);
- Charles Planelli de Lavalette (1816-1817);
- Joseph Pasquier (1817-1818);
- Charles Planelli de Lavalette (1818-1824);
- Joseph du Bouchage (1824-1828);
- Jean-François de Pina de Saint-Didier (1828-1831);
- Augustin Perier (1831-1832);
- Félix Faure (1832-1833);
- Humbert du Bouchage (1833);
- Augustin Perier(1833-1834)
- Félix Faure (1834-1846);
- Alphonse Perier (1846);
- Félix Réal (1846-1848);
- Casimir Royer (1848);
- Louis Crozet (1848-1852);
- Victor Faugier (1852-1858);
- Jacques Louis Randon (1858-1871);
- François Michal-Ladichère (1871-1881);
- Etienne Buyat (1881-1887);
- Jules Ronjat (1887-1893);
- Antonin Dubost (1893-1920);
- Léon Perrier (1920-1940).

=== Since 1945 ===
On April 2, 2015, Jean-Pierre Barbier, Republican (Les Républicains, LR) departmental councillor for the Bièvre canton, was elected president of the departmental council by 34 votes out of 58. He succeeded Alain Cottalorda, from the Socialist Party (Parti Socialiste, PS), who had chaired the departmental council since June 20, 2014.

Period		Identity	Acronym
President of the "Conseil général"
1945	1967	Lucien Hussel	SFIO
1967	1976	Antoine Buisson	MRP, then CD
1976	1985	Louis Mermaz	PS
1985	1997	Alain Carignon	RPR
1997	1998	Michel Hannoun	RPR
1998	2001	Bernard Saugey	DL
2001	2014	André Vallini	PS
2014	2015	Alain Cottalorda	PS
President of the "Conseil départemental"
2015	-	Jean-Pierre Barbier	UMP, then LR

== Departmental councilors ==
The Isère departmental council comprises 58 departmental councillors from Isère's 29 cantons.

President of the "Conseil départemental"
Jean-Pierre Barbier (LR)
Party	Acronym	Elected	Groups
Majority (40 seats)
The Republicans	LR	17	Right, center and civil society
Miscellaneous right (Divers Droite)	DVD	7	Right, center and civil society
Union of Democrats and Independents (Union des démocrates et indépendants)	UDI	5	Right, center and civil society
Miscellaneous centre (Divers centre)	DVC	4	Right, center and civil society
Agir	Agir	1	Right, center and civil society
Reconquest (Reconquête)	REC	1	Right, center and civil society
Miscellaneous centre	DVC	2	Democracy and Progress
Democratic Movement (MoDem)	MoDem	1	Democracy and Progress
Miscellaneous centre	DVC	2	Unlabelled
Opposition (18 seats)
Socialist party	PS	4	Spring of Isère
The Ecologists (Europe Écologie Les Verts)	EÉLV	4	Spring of Isère
French Communist party (Parti communiste français)	PCF	3	Spring of Isère
La France insoumise	LFI	2	Spring of Isère
Miscellaneous left (Divers gauche)	DVG	2	Spring of Isère
Génération.s	G.s	1	Spring of Isère
Renaissance (La République en marche)	LREM	1	Democrat, Liberal and Humanist
Democratic Movement	MoDem	1	Democrat, Liberal and Humanist

== Territorial responsibilities ==
The Isère département is divided into 13 administrative territories. In total, more than 4,600 employees work for the Isère departmental council throughout the département.

== General powers ==
The Conseil départemental has both compulsory and optional powers. The French law on the modernization of territorial public action and the affirmation of metropolises (Loi de modernisation de l'action publique territoriale et d'affirmation des métropoles, MAPTAM) of January 27, 2014, designates the département as the “leader” in terms of social assistance, personal autonomy and territorial solidarity. 21 departmental policies are defined as part of the administration project, to boost the local economy, develop culture and tourism, and maintain innovation and attractiveness in the territories.

== Actions ==
The Departmental Council provided social services, notably through the Allocation Personnalisée d'Autonomie (APA) for the elderly, the Prestation de Compensation du Handicap (PCH) for people with disabilities, the Revenu de solidarité active (RSA) for people in difficulty, the Allocation de Parent Isolé (API) for single parents, and the Fonds de Solidarité pour le Logement (FSL) for housing assistance. A Seniors Plan was launched in 2015 and renewed in 2018. The “IsèreADOM” plan was launched in November 2017.

In addition to the Prestation de Compensation du Handicap, families could apply for assistance with school transport for disabled pupils and students, the Allocation d'Education de l'Enfant Handicapé (AEEH), the Allocation aux adultes handicapés (AAH), and the Reconnaissance de la Qualité de Travailleur Handicapé (RQTH). A website of the Maison Départementale des Personnes Handicapées (MDPH), called Maison Départementale de l'Autonomie (MDA) in Isère, described these benefits and how to claim them.

For low-income households, the Isére department paid the RSA and has been implementing a reciprocity approach since 2016: voluntary RSA recipients were encouraged to get involved in volunteer work, whose skills could be used in their professional search. The drop in the number of RSA recipients has led to a 3.5 million euro reduction in the amount the Département has to pay out to recipients.

The Département worked with children and young people from birth to adulthood, and could by law support them up to the age of 21 to help them become independent and integrate socially or professionally. It was responsible for child welfare (prevention and protection of children and families), maternal and child protection, early childhood care, and the monitoring of childminders.

In 2017, 1,300 young people claiming to be unaccompanied minors arrived in Isère. According to the local authority, unaccompanied foreign minors accounted for 40% of the child protection budget. The “Migrants en Isère” collective disputed this percentage, estimating it at 7%. In 2019, the Isère department was volunteering to become an experimental territory for new state measures for unaccompanied minors (MNAs), with the introduction of a biometric file. The aim was to facilitate the identification and tracking of young people, as well as widespread access to tools for confirming their age, but also to avoid the multiplication of requests from these young people in other départements. Under the modified assessment method, 40% of young people were recognized as minors.

The Isère department launched the “Isère médecins” plan in 2017.

== Sales and promotional activities ==
=== Territorial brands ===
In 2017, the Isère departmental council created several brands to promote the department's assets: The Isère departmental council wants to defend Isère's tourist appeal, under the banner of the Alpes Is(H)ere brand launched in 2017.

Several tools are being activated to promote the brand locally, regionally, and nationally, such as the creation of Isère Attractivité, an Isère attraction agency that has replaced Isère Tourisme since January 1, 2020.

Created in 2018, Is(H)ere is a brand that aims to guarantee both the Isère geographical provenance and the quality of agricultural and agri-food products, while ensuring fair remuneration for producers of agricultural and agri-food products.

The brand was created by the Pôle Agroalimentaire Isérois at the instigation of the Isère department, in partnership with local authorities and consular chambers. The brand was inaugurated on June 27, 2018, at the Isère prefecture.

== Budget ==
In 2020, the budget of the Isére department was 1.6 billion euros.

The breakdown of the provisional budget voted by the departmental assembly at its public meeting on December 19, 2019, was as follows

Area of investment		Investment In millions of euros	Percentage share
Family		809,71	50,6%
	Seniors	192,20	
	People with disabilities	174,30	
	Public health	196,06	
	Social cohesion	140,43	
	Children and family	152,49	
	Education	124,12	
	Housing	14,21	
	Youth and sports	8,10	
Living environment		308,15	19,3%
	Transports	127,87	
	Routes	105,22	
	Civil security (including SDIS 38)	54,44	
	Water	6,41	
	Agriculture, forestry and timber	7,97	
	Environment and sustainable development	6,25	
Attractiveness of the region		140,15	8,8%
	Support for local authorities, local amenities	40,75	
	Digital development	38,96	
	Tourism, mountains, development, research, innovation	17,85	
	Culture and citizenship	34,05	
Resources		341,62	21,4%
	Human resources	199,10	
	Finance	90,03	
	General administration	27,41	
	Departmental buildings	25,08	

In 2013, the budget of the Conseil Général de l'Isère (renamed Conseil Départemental de l'Isère in 2015), was 1.36 billion euros.

The breakdown of the Conseil Général's 2013 budget was as follows:

Area of investment	Investment In millions of euros
Seniors	163,6
People with disabilities	158,2
Transports	155,5
Children and family	134,6
Social cohesion	125,7
Routes	97,7
Education	97,3
Fire safety	52,6
Aid to communes	39
Culture and heritage	18,4
Water and hydraulic engineering	12,5
Economy-Social	11,4
Agriculture	7,5
Housing	6,5
Environment, energy, waste	6,3
Youth and sports	5
Digital development	4,7
Tourism and mountains	4,4
Public health	2,8
Forestry and timber	0.826
Decentralized cooperation	0.434

== Official bulletins and deliberations ==
The Bulletins Officiels du Isére Département de l'Isère (BODI) are the local authority's official publications. Published monthly on the Isére department website, they publicized regulatory decrees, decisions and deliberations.

Deliberations are decisions taken by a collective body (permanent commission or departmental assembly). All deliberations could be consulted on the local authority's website using a dedicated search engine.

The decisions and votes of elected representatives could be followed live at public meetings held several times a year by Isère departmental councillors. The Isère departmental assembly generally met in the Aubert-Dubayet hemicycle at the Hôtel du Département in Grenoble. The press was invited to attend. Public meetings were broadcast live or replayed on the local authority's website.

== See also ==
- Isère
- Regional Council of Rhône-Alpes
