= Fédération nationale des Jaunes de France =

French trade union

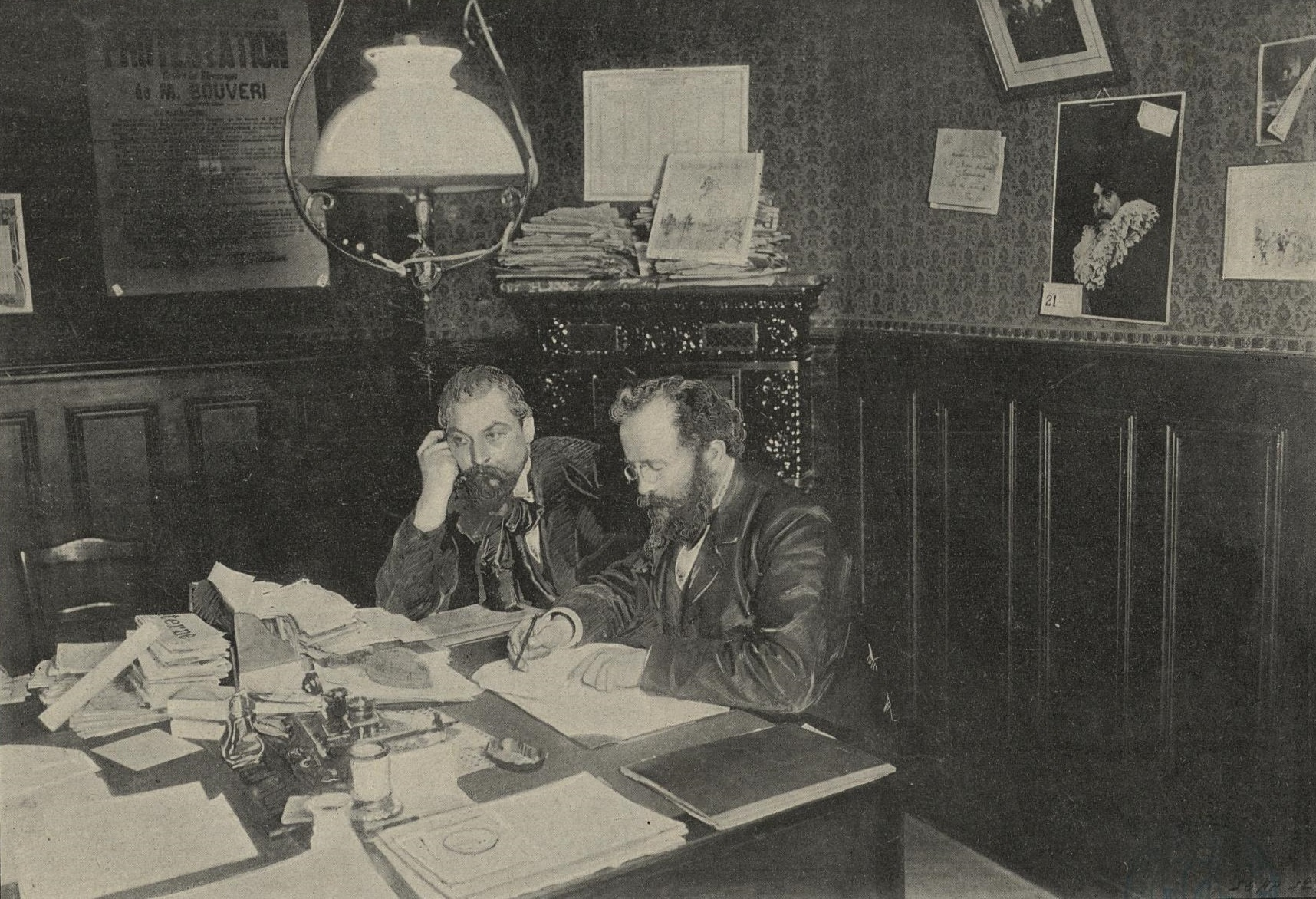
Lenoir [sic], General Secretary of the new independent Labour Exchange, and Mr. Biétri [sic], Assistant Secretary, in March 1902

The Fédération nationale des Jaunes de France (English: National Federation of the Yellows of France) was a French 'yellow' or company union founded by Pierre Biétry on 1 April 1902 and active until 1912.

According to historian George L. Mosse, the union "received this name when workers who refused to strike used yellow paper to stop up the windows of their meeting place, which had been smashed by strikers" in 1901 at Montceau-les-Mines.

== See also ==
- Yellow socialism
