= Labour Charter =

A Labour Charter could refer to:

- Charte du travail of Vichy France in 1941
- The Labour Charter of 1927 of Fascist Italy
