= Isère's 8th constituency =

Constituency of the National Assembly of France

8th constituency of Isère
- inline Constituency of the National Assembly of France

- Constituency in Department

- Location of Isère in France
- Deputy: Hanane Mansouri; LR (UXD)
- Department: Isère

The 8th constituency of Isère is one of ten French legislative constituencies in the Isère département.

After the 2010 redistricting of French legislative constituencies added a tenth constituency to Isère, the 8th constituency consists of the (pre-2015 cantonal re-organisation) cantons of Heyrieux, Vienne-Nord, Vienne-Sud, Auberives-sur-Varèze, Cheyssieu, Clonas-sur-Varèze, Saint-Alban-du-Rhône, Saint-Clair-du-Rhône, Saint-Maurice-l'Exil, Saint-Prim and Vernioz and the communes of Assieu.

== Deputies ==
Election	Member	Party
1988	Louis Mermaz	PS
1993	Bernard Saugey	UPF - UDF
1997	Louis Mermaz	PS
2002	Jacques Remiller	UMP
2007	Jacques Remiller	UMP
2012	Erwann Binet	PS
2017	Caroline Abadie	LREM
2022	Caroline Abadie	RE
2024	Hanane Mansouri	UXD

== Election results ==
=== 2024 ===
Candidate	Party	Alliance	First round			Second round		
Candidate	Party	Alliance	Votes	%	+/–	Votes	%	+/–
Hanane Mansouri	LR-RN	UXD	22,847	39.92	+17.01	28,995	54.10	+7.73
Cécile Michel	LE	NFP	14,021	24.50	+1.62	24,601	45.90	new
Caroline Abadie	REN	Ensemble	11,727	20.49	-2.69	withdrew		
Jean-Claude Lassalle	LR	UDC	7,923	13.84	-7.05			
Jacques Lacaille	LO		623	1.09	-0.17			
Aurore Galves	DIV		91	0.16	new			
Votes			57,232	100.00		53,596	100.00	
Valid votes			57,232	97.68	-0.58	53,596	91.39	+0.13
Blank votes			1,026	1.75	+0.47	4,059	6.92	+0.04
Null votes			336	0.57	+0.11	990	1.69	-0.17
Turnout			58,594	70.73	+22.24	58,645	70.77	+25.57
Abstentions			24,248	29.27	-22.24	24,224	29.23	-25.57
Registered voters			82,842			82,869		
Result			UXD GAIN					

=== 2022 ===
Legislative Election 2022: Isère's 8th constituency
Party	Candidate	Votes	%	±%
LREM (Ensemble)	Caroline Abadie	9,113	23.18	-9.15
RN	Benoit Auguste	9,007	22.91	+3.76
EELV (NUPÉS)	Quentin Dogon	8,995	22.88	−2.29
LR (UDC)	Jean-Claude Lassalle	8,213	20.89	+3.35
REC	Thibaut Monnier	1,663	4.23	N/A
DVE	Eloïc Dufour	1,183	3.01	N/A
Others	N/A	1,133		
Turnout		39,307	48.49	+0.93
2nd round result
LREM (Ensemble)	Caroline Abadie	18,251	53.63	-10.29
RN	Benoit Auguste	15,782	46.37	+10.29
Turnout		34,033	45.20	+3.61
LREM hold		Swing	-10.29	

=== 2017 ===
Candidate	Label	First round		Second round	
Candidate	Label	Votes	%	Votes	%
Caroline Abadie	REM	11,757	32.33	18,907	63.92
Thibaut Monnier	FN	6,966	19.15	10,671	36.08
Maryline Silvestre	LR	6,379	17.54		
Erwann Binet	PS	5,257	14.45		
Myriam Thieulent	FI	3,899	10.72		
Éric Berger	ECO	605	1.66		
Michèle Durieux	ECO	513	1.41		
Véronique Barrow	DIV	399	1.10		
Jacques Lacaille	EXG	333	0.92		
Jacqueline Godard	ECO	263	0.72		
Votes		36,371	100.00	29,578	100.00
Valid votes		36,371	97.32	29,578	90.52
Blank votes		487	1.30	2,333	7.14
Null votes		515	1.38	766	2.34
Turnout		37,373	47.56	32,677	41.59
Abstentions		41,214	52.44	45,894	58.41
Registered voters		78,587		78,571	
Source: Ministry of the Interior

=== 2012 ===
2012 legislative election in Isere's 8th constituency
Candidate	Party	First round		Second round	
Candidate	Party	Votes	%	Votes	%
Erwann Binet	PS	16,186	37.09%	20,903	50.57%
Jacques Remiller	UMP	14,122	32.36%	20,433	49.43%
Marie Guimar	FN	8,605	19.72%		
André Mondange	FG	1,951	4.47%		
Michèle Cedrin	MoDem	1,102	2.53%		
Jacques Jury	MEI	417	0.96%		
Brigitte Villard Courchet	Ecologiste	351	0.80%		
Nicole Chosson	AEI	292	0.67%		
Fabrice Dezutter	CPNT	279	0.64%		
Jacques Lacaille	LO	176	0.40%		
Patrick Seris	NPA	155	0.36%		
Valid votes		43,636	98.93%	41,335	97.22%
Spoilt and null votes		472	1.07%	1,182	2.78%
Votes cast / turnout		44,108	58.76%	42,517	56.64%
Abstentions		30,963	41.24%	32,550	43.36%
Registered voters		75,071	100.00%	75,067	100.00%

=== 2007 ===
Legislative Election 2007: Isère's 8th constituency
Party	Candidate	Votes	%	±%
UMP	Jacques Remiller	25,636	44.22	
PS	Erwann Binet	13,769	23.75	
MoDem	Michèle Cedrin	5,198	8.97	
PCF	Marcel Berthouard	3,861	6.66	
FN	Robert Arlaud	3,216	5.55	
LV	Michel Wilson	1,822	3.14	
Far left	Catherine Faivre D'Arcier	1,161	2.00	
Others	N/A	3,314		
Turnout		58,962	57.46	
2nd round result
UMP	Jacques Remiller	30,374	53.51	
PS	Erwann Binet	26,385	46.49	
Turnout		58,448	56.96	
UMP hold				

=== 2002 ===
Legislative Election 2002: Isère's 8th constituency
Party	Candidate	Votes	%	±%
UMP	Jacques Remiller	20,893	36.15	
DVG	Christian Nucci	12,183	21.08	
FN	Pierre Rosales	9,310	16.11	
LV	Michel Wilson	4,685	8.11	
PCF	Daniel Rigaud	4,163	7.20	
DVD	Alexis Bouchard	1,691	2.93	
Others	N/A	4,866		
Turnout		59,040	62.90	
2nd round result
UMP	Jacques Remiller	28,338	56.40	
DVG	Christian Nucci	21,910	43.60	
Turnout		52,916	56.38	
UMP gain from PS				

=== 1997 ===
Legislative Election 1997: Isère's 8th constituency
Party	Candidate	Votes	%	±%
UDF	Bernard Saugey	16,127	28.22	
PS	Louis Mermaz	15,064	26.36	
FN	Jean-Jacques Ogier	12,316	21.55	
PCF	Marcel Berthouard	5,415	9.47	
LV	Herve Prat	2,359	4.13	
LO	Jacques Lacaille	1,729	3.03	
GE	Bernard Berthel	1,548	2.71	
DVD	André Prutau	1,252	2.19	
Others	N/A	1,345		
Turnout		59,924	31.45	
2nd round result
PS	Louis Mermaz	27,035	43.45	
UDF	Bernard Saugey	25,907	41.63	
FN	Jean-Jacques Ogier	9,283	14.92	
Turnout		64,532	73.82	
PS gain from UDF				
