= Hanane Mansouri =

French politician (born 2000)

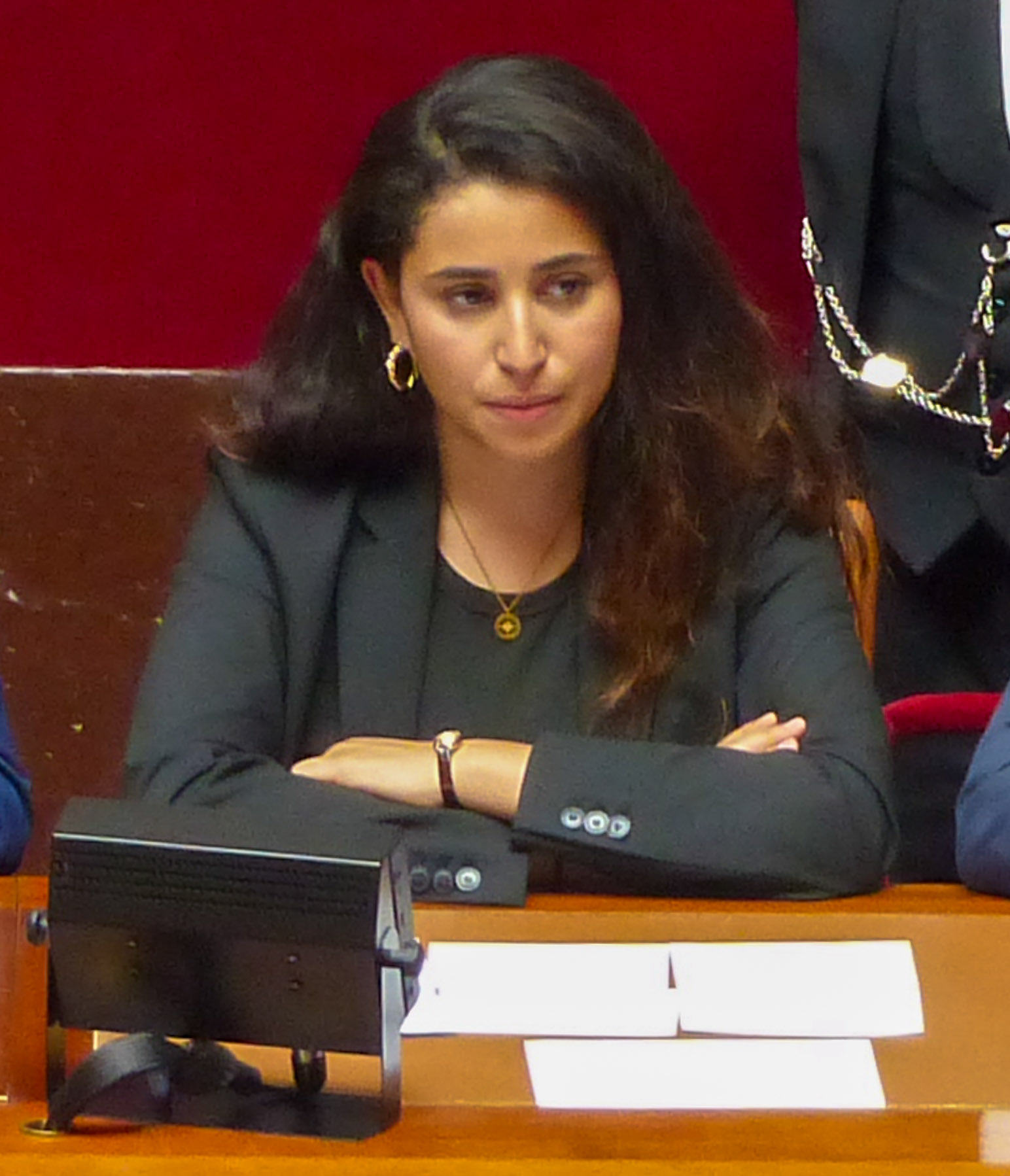
- Mansouri in 2024

Member of the National Assembly for Isère's 8th constituency
- Incumbent
- Assumed office 8 July 2024
- Preceded by: Caroline Abadie

Personal details
- Born: 24 November 2000 (age 25) Échirolles, France
- Party: Union of the Right for the Republic (2024–present)
- Other political affiliations: The Republicans (until 2024)

Hanane Mansouri (French pronunciation: [anan mɑ̃suʁi]; born 24 November 2000) is a French politician of the Union of the Right for the Republic (UDR) who was elected to represent the 8th constituency of Isère in the National Assembly in 2024.

== Early life and career ==
Mansouri is of Moroccan origin. She is the first woman with Maghrebi ancestry to serve as a deputy for Union of the Right for the Republic (UDR). She is a former president of Les Jeunes Républicains in Isère, and was a member of the Union Nationale Inter-universitaire (UNI).

In the 2024 legislative election, Mansouri defeated Cécile Michel of The Ecologists with 54.1% of the second-round vote in the 8th constituency of Isère. Incumbent Caroline Abadie of Renaissance placed third in the first round.
