= Pierre Jouvet =

French politician (born 1986)

Pierre Jouvet MEP
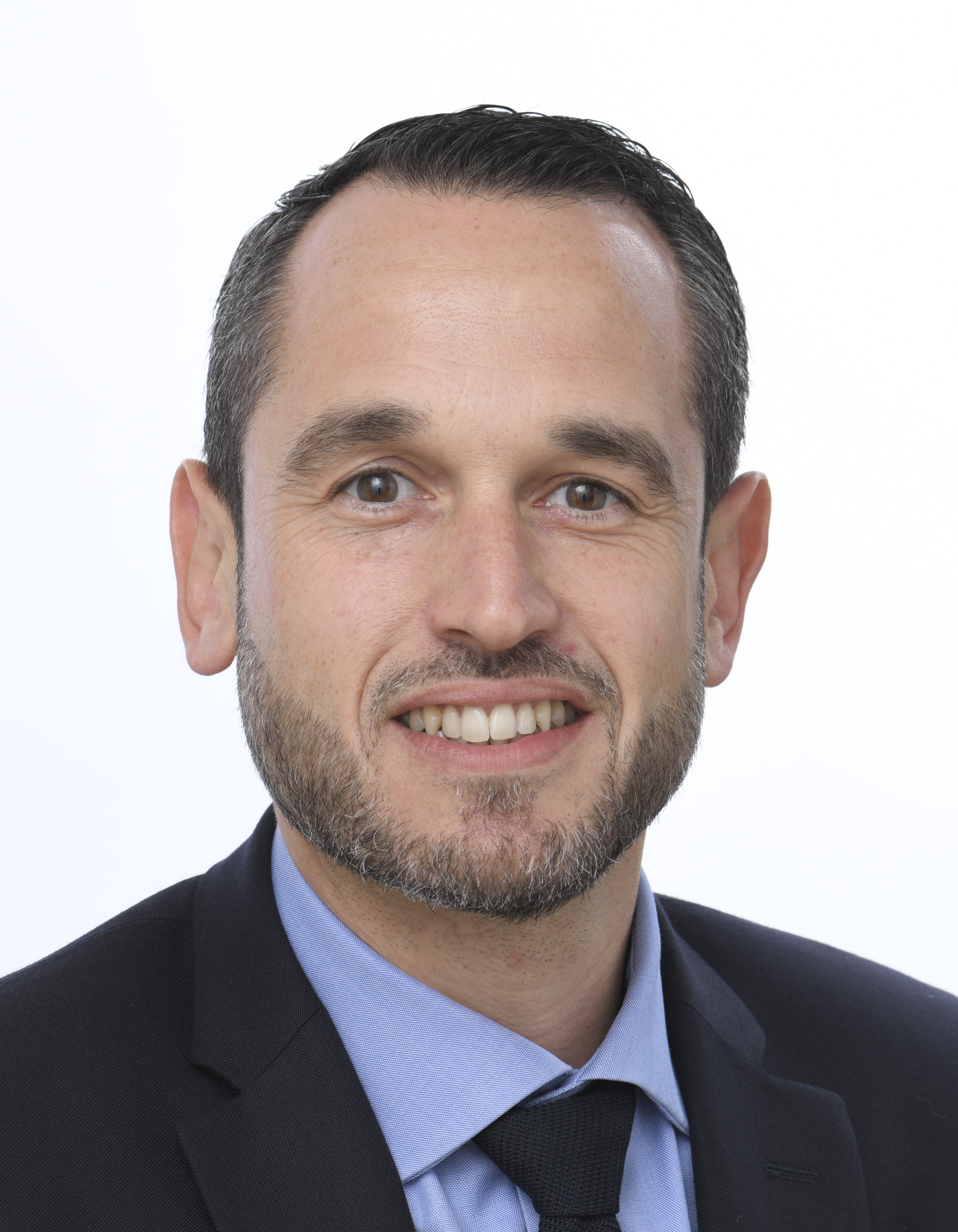
- Official portrait, 2024

Member of the European Parliament for France
- Incumbent
- Assumed office 16 July 2024

Personal details
- Born: 6 October 1986 (age 40) Valence, France
- Party: Socialist Party
- Other political affiliations: Party of European Socialists

Pierre Jouvet (French: [pjɛʁ ʒuvɛ]; born 6 October 1986) is a French politician of the Socialist Party who was elected member of the European Parliament in 2024. He has been serving as secretary-general of the Socialist Party since 2023, and as a member of the departmental council of Drôme since 2015. Until his election to the European Parliament, he served as mayor of Saint-Vallier and president of the Porte de DrômArdèche communauté de communes.

== Early life and career ==
Jouvet was born in Valence, to socialist parents working as teachers. He supported François Hollande in the 2011 presidential primary, and Manuel Valls in the 2017 primary. In the 2017 and 2022 legislative elections, he was a candidate for Drôme's 4th constituency. He was chosen as one of the Socialist Party's spokespeople in 2018, and was elected secretary-general of the party in 2023.
