= Marie-Hélène Thoraval =

French politician (born 1966)

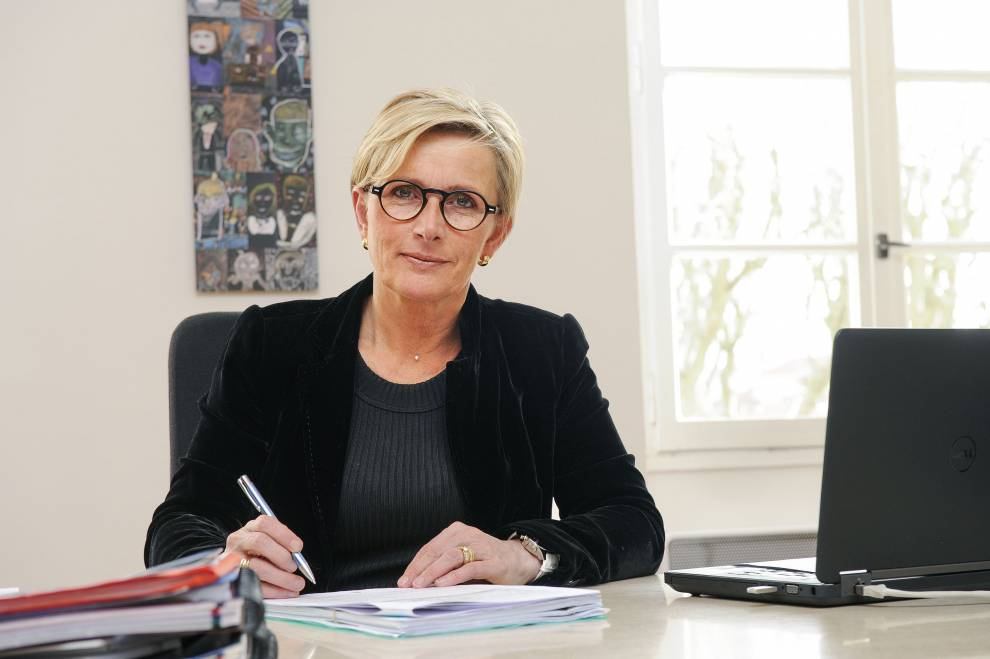

Mayor of Romans-sur-Isère
- Incumbent
- Assumed office 30 March 2014
- Preceded by: Philippe Drésin

Member of the Regional Council of Auvergne-Rhône-Alpes
- Incumbent
- Assumed office 4 January 2016

Deputy for Drôme's 4th constituency in the National Assembly of France
- In office 2010–2012
- Preceded by: Gabriel Biancheri
- Succeeded by: Nathalie Nieson

Personal details
- Born: 3 June 1966 (age 59) Coutances, France
- Party: The Republicans

Marie-Hélène Thoraval (French pronunciation: [maʁielɛn tɔʁaval]; born 3 June 1966) is a French politician who has served as mayor of Romans-sur-Isère since 2014 and a member of the Regional Council of Auvergne-Rhône-Alpes since 2016.

== Political career ==
Thoraval was a member of the National Assembly of France from 2010 to 2012. She was the substitute candidate for Gabriel Biancheri in the 2007 French legislative election in Drôme's 4th constituency. She succeeded Biancheri following his death in 2010.

Thoraval is a member of the Union for a Popular Movement.

== Political positions ==
In 2019, Thoraval publicly declared her support for incumbent President Emmanuel Macron.
