= Étienne Léandri =

Étienne Léandri (1915–1995) was an intermediary close to Charles Pasqua, the right-wing French Minister of the Interior. Léandri was part of the drug trafficking operation the French Connection as well as the Corsican Mafia. He took part in the negotiations concerning many important international contracts, and represented, among others, the interests of Elf, Thomson-CSF and Dumez.

== Career ==
Leandri manufactured "gazogene" engines, which use the burning of wood or charcoal to power automobiles. This method of powering autos had been developed at the turn of the 19th century, but during the Second World War, Leandri built a factory in Nice to retrofit automobiles formerly running on petrol with the gazogene apparatus attached.

During the war, he was a business associate of the American pharmaceutical and perfume manufacturer, E. Virgil Neal, who started the brand Tokalon; and, according to some accounts, Léandri had become Director of Tokalon by 1944. Léandri was also the lover of Neal's third wife, Renée.

Léandri was involved in various political scandals, such as the Affaire de la Sofremi, for which Pasqua has been indicted, and the affair concerning the moving of the headquarters of the GEC-Alsthom Transport firms (for which Pasqua has also been indicted). In 1994 the second affair concerning Alstom generated a commission of 5.2 million Francs (790,000 Euros) paid by Pasqua to Étienne Léandri.

== See also ==
- Charles Pasqua
- Service d'Action Civique
