= Initiative and Liberty Movement =

The Initiative and Liberty Movement (French: Mouvement initiative et liberté, MIL) is a French Gaullist political association.

== History ==
First called GIL (Initiative and Liberty Groups), it was established in March 1981 and became the Initiative and Liberty Movement on November 17, 1981. It was chaired by Jacques Rougeot, who was close to the Rally for the Republic (RPR) and president of the National Inter-University Union (UNI). General Alain de Boissieu, Pierre Messmer and Jacques Foccart also participated in its establishment.

The MIL was born before the victory of the left in 1981. It tried "to prevent that, after having seized political power, the socialist-communists definitely put their hands on and minds on the structures of France", according to its terms.

As Pierre Debizet said on TF1 on July 25, 1985, the MIL does not consider itself officially as a "resurgence" of the Service d'Action Civique (SAC).

From 1986 on, its new cause was to liberate France from the "socialist stagnation". Pierre Debizet compared, in 1985, socialism to AIDS.

However, the MIL struggled to take off, though it had several thousand members, including Alain Peyrefitte and the former Chief of Staff of the Army, General Jean Delaunay. Yet one thing was certain: despite low name recognition, everybody on the right knew the MIL.

About the ideas of MIL in the 1980s, the historian François Audigier said: "The MIL is a kind of ideological laboratory, which crossed the diverse influences of the liberal right, a reactionary Catholicism and a rigid Gaullism. It used an anti-immigration, pro-life, defense of private schools and the rejection of left-wing values, a package that had nothing to envy to the National Front's program".

== Today ==
The MIL, now chaired by Christian Labrousse, who claims to be on the "civic right" a Gaullist and a patriot. Its emblem is the Cross of Lorraine. This movement is associated to the Union for a Popular Movement (UMP). It is part of the UMP's right-wing and is a "Gaullist loyalist" organization as opposed to neo-Gaullism, which integrates neoliberalism and moderate centre-right ideas.

The MIL is a "movement of thought" out of defending the common civic values (primacy of individual freedom, responsibility, duty and cohesion of society). Gaullism is for the MIL an inspiration.

He considers that communitarianism, immigration and Islamism threaten the national identity of France, and that resistance is a civic duty.

Pierre Clostermann, a Companion of the Liberation; Jacques Foccart, former head of Free France network and former General Secretary of the Presidency of the Republic between 1959 and 1974; Michel Habib-Deloncle, former minister of General de Gaulle; Pierre Messmer, a Companion of the Liberation and former Prime Minister and Maurice Schumann, a former minister and a Companion of the Liberation, now dead, were members of its honorary committee.

Are also members of the honorary committee of the MIL

- Jacques Boyon, Chairman of the Board of Directors of IRIS
- Bernard Debré, UMP deputy
- Xavier Deniau, former minister
- Robert Galley, Companion of the Liberation
- Philippe de Gaulle, son of General de Gaulle
- Jacques Godfrain, former member UMP
- Yves Guéna, honorary president of the New Century Club,
- Hugues Martin, former UMP deputy (replaced Alain Juppé in Parliament)
- Robert Pandraud, former RPR-UMP member
- Charles Pasqua, UMP senator
- Armel Pécheul, close to the Movement for France
- Eric Raoult, UMP deputy
- Jean Tiberi, UMP deputy

In the 1995 French presidential election it supported Jacques Chirac to "escape from socialism" and repeated its support for Chirac in the 2002 election ("Chirac, the true Gaullist") and it supported Nicolas Sarkozy in the 2007 election. It opposed the Treaty establishing a Constitution for Europe in 2005.
