= Erwann Binet =

French politician

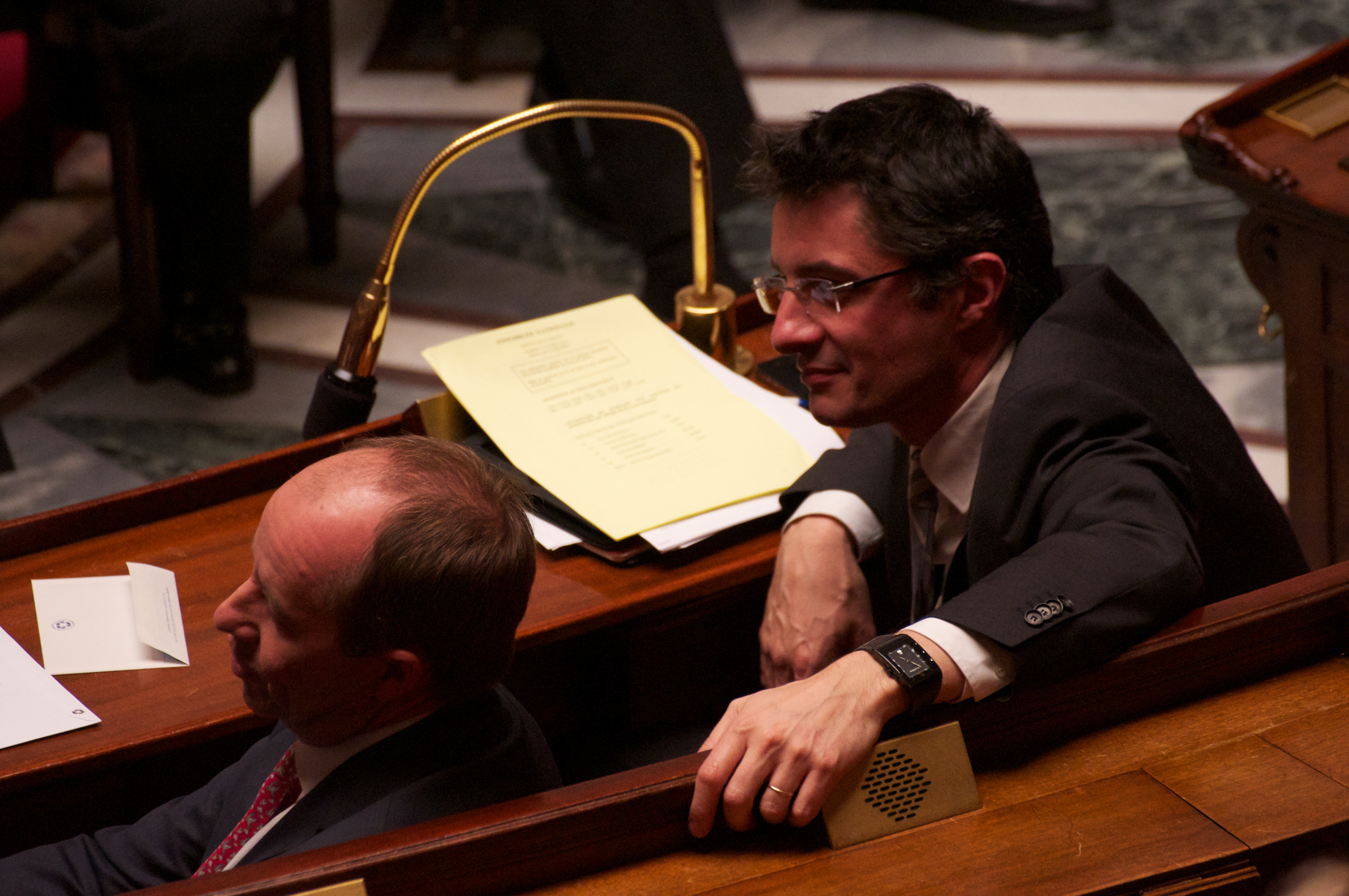
- Erwann Binet (right) in 2013

Member of the National Assembly for Isère's 8th constituency
- In office 20 June 2012 – 20 June 2017
- Preceded by: Jacques Remiller
- Succeeded by: Caroline Abadie

Personal details
- Born: 30 July 1972 (age 53) Brest, France
- Party: Socialist Party

Erwann Binet (born 30 July 1972) is a French politician.

Binet was born in Brest, Finistère. He was first elected to the National Assembly in the 2012 election, and served as the deputy for the eighth circonscription of Isère on the Socialist Party ticket, succeeding Jacques Remiller to the post. He was appointed rapporteur for the Law Commission for the passage of Bill 344. He lost the 2017 election to Caroline Abadie of LREM.
