= Confederation of Free Trade Unions (France) =

The Confederation of Free Trade Unions (Confédération des syndicats libres, CSL) was a French trade union confederation created in the 1950s. It was considered close to employers and on the right. Initially called the Confédération française du travail (CFT), it changed its name in 1977 following public outrage after a unionist was killed by CFT members. The CSL dissolved in 2002. It was primarily active in the automobile industry, the postal service, and the city administration of Paris.

== History ==
=== The French Confederation of Labor (1959–1977) ===
==== Post-war period ====
In 1947, the Confederation of Independent Labor (Confédération du travail indépendant, CTI) was founded but suffered from power struggles and splits. The CTI included former communist unionists, activists from the Syndicats movement led by René Belin, and members of the Rally of the French People (RPF), the party created by General Charles de Gaulle.

In 1959, the CFT was founded by merging unions that had previously left the General Confederation of Independent Trade Unions (Confédération Générale des Syndicats Indépendants, CGSI) and others dissatisfied with CGSI’s structure. Heavily influenced by anti-communism, the CFT aimed to counteract unions like the CGT. Its creation was reportedly encouraged by Simca, which used it to gain control of its Works Council.

The CFT was never recognized as representative and relied on employer support to sustain its influence.

==== The 1960s ====
Under the leadership of Jacques Simakis, the CFT maintained close ties to right-wing organizations, including the Service d'action civique (SAC). During the events of May 1968, the CFT opposed strikes and organized "freedom of work" pickets, notably in the Simca Poissy factory.

==== The 1970s ====
By the 1970s, the CFT was frequently associated with violent actions against other unions, particularly the CGT. In 1975, the union shifted further to the right under the leadership of Auguste Blanc, a supporter of the SAC. The Communist magazine Contretemps claimed that many members were linked with right-wing and far-right collaborationist networks.

=== Confederation of Free Trade Unions (1977–2002) ===
In 1977, following the fatal attack by members of the CFT on a CGT member, the CFT rebranded itself as the Confederation of Free Trade Unions (CSL). The name change marked an attempt to distance itself from its violent past.

The CSL's influence waned in the 1980s and 1990s as public funding and employer support declined.

After losing funding from the city of Paris following the defeat of the RPR in the 2001 municipal elections, the CSL dissolved in October 2002. Its members were encouraged to join Force ouvrière (FO).

== Analyses and documents ==
Historians Nicolas Hatzfeld and Jean-Louis Loubet describe the CSL as a corporatist union that worked closely with employers and opposed communist unions like the CGT. It maintained order within factories and engaged in violent confrontations during strikes, such as the Talbot Poissy strike of 1982.
