= Departmental council (France) =

Administrative bodies governing French départements

Current political majority in each departmental council: French Communist Party Socialist Party Miscellaneous left Radical Party of the Left Democratic Movement Union of Democrats and Independents The Republicans Miscellaneous right

The departmental councils (French: conseils départementaux [kɔ̃sɛj depaʁtəmɑ̃to]; singular, conseil départemental [kɔ̃sɛj depaʁtəmɑ̃tal]) of France are representative assemblies elected by universal suffrage in 98 of the country's 101 departments. (Note: The other three are Guyane, Martinique, and Paris, governed by respectively the Assemblée de Guyane, the Assemblée de Martinique, and the Conseil de Paris.) Prior to the 2015 French departmental elections they were known as general councils (conseils généraux; singular, conseil général).

== History ==
The Law of 22 December 1789 required the establishment of an assembly in each department, known as the council of the department. This law was repealed on 4 December 1793; it was restored as the "law on the division of the territory of the Republic and its administration" on 17 February 1800, in which, "General Council of the departments" were formed. At this time, the name "General Council" was also used by town and district councils.

The members of the general council were not elected until 1833; they were first elected by universal manhood suffrage on 3 July 1848. The first female president of a department council was Évelyne Baylet in Tarn-et-Garonne in 1970.

Until the passing of the Law of 2 March 1982 on the rights and freedoms of communes, departments, and regions, the prefect in each department was not only the state's representative in that department but also served as the department's executive; since 1982, the latter function has been transferred to the president of the departmental council.

Law 175 of 26 February 2008 states that there must be at least one candidate of each gender in all departmental council elections.

== See also ==
- List of presidents of departmental councils (France)
- Regional Council (France)
- Isère departmental council
