= Drôme's 4th constituency =

Constituency of the National Assembly of France

4th constituency of Drôme
- inline Constituency of the National Assembly of France

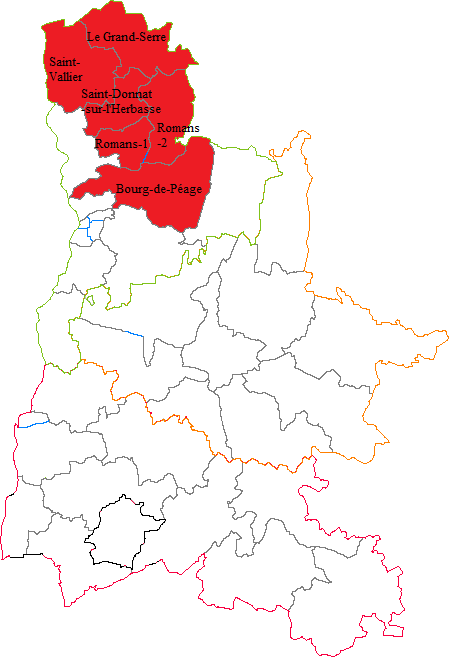
- Boundary of Drôme's 4th constituency in Drôme

- Drôme in France
- Deputy: Thibaut Monnier; RN
- Department: Drôme

The 4th constituency of Drôme is a French legislative constituency in the Drôme département. It contains the cantons Bourg-de-Péage, Le Grand-Serre, Romans-sur-Isère-1, Romans-sur-Isère-2, Saint-Donat-sur-l'Herbasse and Saint-Vallier.

== Deputies ==
Election	Member	Party
1988	Georges Durand	UDF
1993	Georges Durand	UDF
1997	Henri Bertholet	PS
2002	Gabriel Biancheri	UMP
2007	Gabriel Biancheri then Marie-Hélène Thoraval	UMP
2012	Nathalie Nieson	PS
2017	Emmanuelle Anthoine	LR
2022	Emmanuelle Anthoine	LR
2024	Thibaut Monnier	RN

== Election results ==
=== 2024 ===
Candidate	Party	Alliance	First round			Second round		
Candidate	Party	Alliance	Votes	%	+/–	Votes	%	+/–
Thibaut Monnier	RN		26,621	38.37	+18.25	29,846	41.97	new
Isabelle Pagani	PS	NFP	18,222	26.27	-4.23	22,788	32.05	-10.05
Emmanuelle Anthoine	LR		16,635	23.98	-1.84	18,473	25.98	-31.92
Olivier Gafa	MoDem	ENS	5,762	8.31	-7.68			
Guy Bermond	DLF		798	1.15	-0.48			
Evelyne Reybert	REC		702	1.01	-2.82			
Monique Bernard	LO		634	0.91	-0.32			
Votes			69,374	100.00		71,107	100.00	
Valid votes			69,374	97.79	-0.51	71,107	97.94	+2.26
Blank votes			1,040	1.47	+0.27	1,045	1.44	-1.66
Null votes			525	0.74	+0.24	453	0.62	-0.60
Turnout			70,939	70.44	+20.47	72,605	72.09	+22.82
Abstentions			29,763	29.56	-20.47	28,112	27.91	-22.82
Registered voters			100,702			100,717		
Source: Ministry of the Interior, Le Monde
Result		RN GAIN FROM LR						

=== 2022 ===
Legislative Election 2022: Drôme's 4th constituency
Party	Candidate	Votes	%	±%
PS (NUPÉS)	Pierre Jouvet	14,858	30.50	-3.70
LR (UDC)	Emmanuelle Anthoine	12,579	25.82	+4.70
RN	Véronique Stin	9,801	20.12	+2.83
MoDem (Ensemble)	Olivier Gafa	7,791	15.99	−6.35
REC	Geneviève Verny	1,864	3.83	N/A
Others	N/A	1,824		
Turnout		49,559	49.97	−0.19
2nd round result
LR (UDC)	Emmanuelle Anthoine	27,076	57.90	+1.45
PS (NUPÉS)	Pierre Jouvet	19,685	42.10	N/A
Turnout		46,761	49.27	+6.37
LR hold				

=== 2017 ===
Candidate	Label	First round		Second round	
Candidate	Label	Votes	%	Votes	%
Latifa Chay	REM	10,345	22.34	15,520	43.55
Emmanuelle Anthoine	LR	9,779	21.12	20,116	56.45
Bruno Derly	FN	8,007	17.29		
Pierre Jouvet	PS	7,980	17.23		
Emma Ould Aoudia	FI	4,922	10.63		
Dominique Reynaud	ECO	2,094	4.52		
Jean-Marc Durand	PCF	845	1.82		
Raphaël Bertrand	DVD	713	1.54		
Alain Lavedrine	DVD	411	0.89		
Monique Bernard	EXG	385	0.83		
Dorothée Roullet	DIV	367	0.79		
Christine Collonge	DIV	253	0.55		
Martine Cavasse	EXD	118	0.25		
Paul Pelardy	DVD	86	0.19		
Nadia Mana	DVG	0	0.00		
Votes		46,305	100.00	35,636	100.00
Valid votes		46,305	97.95	35,636	88.14
Blank votes		702	1.48	3,403	8.42
Null votes		268	0.57	1,393	3.45
Turnout		47,275	50.16	40,432	42.90
Abstentions		46,982	49.84	53,817	57.10
Registered voters		94,257		94,249	
Source: Ministry of the Interior

=== 2012 ===
2012 legislative election in Drome's 4th constituency
Candidate	Party	First round		Second round	
Candidate	Party	Votes	%	Votes	%
Nathalie Nieson	PS	19,068	35.53%	26,952	52.72%
Marie-Hélène Thoraval	UMP	16,100	30.00%	24,168	47.28%
Joël Cheval	FN	10,946	20.39%		
Jean-Marc Durand	FG	2,995	5.58%		
Jean-David Abel	EELV	1,901	3.54%		
Gérard Oriol	NC	1,067	1.99%		
Annie Vital	NPA	686	1.28%		
Claudine Chenu	??	592	1.10%		
Monique Bernard	LO	305	0.57%		
Jacques Durand		11	0.02%		
Valid votes		53,671	98.85%	51,120	97.33%
Spoilt and null votes		625	1.15%	1,403	2.67%
Votes cast / turnout		54,296	60.32%	52,523	58.33%
Abstentions		35,721	39.68%	37,514	41.67%
Registered voters		90,017	100.00%	90,037	100.00%

=== 2007 ===
Legislative Election 2007: Drôme's 4th constituency
Party	Candidate	Votes	%	±%
UMP	Gabriel Biancheri	23,416	45.93	
DVG	Catherine Coutard	12,548	24.61	
MoDem	Gérard Oriol	4,498	8.82	
FN	Bernard Pinet	3,402	6.67	
LV	Jean-David Abel	2,089	4.10	
PCF	Jean-Marc Durand	1,459	2.86	
EXG	Yannick Vitton-Mea	1,297	2.54	
Others	N/A	2,276		
Turnout		51,688	60.37	
2nd round result
UMP	Gabriel Biancheri	28,950	57.70	
DVG	Catherine Coutard	21,225	42.30	
Turnout		51,496	60.14	
UMP hold				

=== 2002 ===
Legislative Election 2002: Drôme's 4th constituency
Party	Candidate	Votes	%	±%
UMP	Gabriel Biancheri	17,195	34.15	
PS	Henri Bertholet	13,999	27.81	
FN	Bernard Pinet	9,038	17.95	
DVD	Philippe Tormento	3,495	6.94	
PCF	Jacques Faure	1,660	3.30	
LV	Jean-Marie Chosson	1,349	2.68	
Others	N/A	3,610		
Turnout		50,346	66.06	
2nd round result
UMP	Gabriel Biancheri	27,845	60.33	
PS	Henri Bertholet	18,312	39.67	
Turnout		46,157	61.75	
UMP gain from PS				

=== 1997 ===
Legislative Election 1997: Drôme's 4th constituency
Party	Candidate	Votes	%	±%
PR (UDF)	Georges Durand	12,243	26.46	
PS	Henri Bertholet	12,036	26.01	
FN	Bernard Pinet	10,337	22.34	
PCF	Jacques Faure	3,844	8.31	
LV	Jean-Marie Chausson	2,193	4.74	
LDI	Françoise Hauss	1,651	3.57	
GE	Jean-Louis Blard	1,367	2.95	
DIV	Pierre Coup	1,176	2.54	
LO	Didier Machou	1,067	2.31	
DVG	Monique Bourbonneux	358	0.77	
Turnout		46,272	66.97	
2nd round result
PS	Henri Bertholet	22,172	42.91	
PR (UDF)	Georges Durand	19,905	38.52	
FN	Bernard Pinet	9,597	18.57	
Turnout		51,674	73.91	
PS gain from PR				
