= Jacques Remiller =

French politician

Member of the National Assembly for Isère's 8th constituency
- In office 2002–2012
- Preceded by: Louis Mermaz
- Succeeded by: Erwann Binet

Mayor of Vienne
- In office 2001–2014
- Preceded by: Louis Mermaz
- Succeeded by: Thierry Kovacs

Personal details
- Born: 13 April 1941 (age 84) Condrieu, France
- Party: UMP

Jacques Remiller (born April 13, 1941 in Condrieu) is a former member of the National Assembly of France, representing Isère's 8th constituency from 2002 to 2012 as a member of the Union for a Popular Movement.
