= Thibaut Monnier =

French politician (born 1987)

Member of the National Assembly for Drôme's 4th constituency
- Incumbent
- Assumed office 8 July 2024
- Preceded by: Emmanuelle Anthoine

Personal details
- Born: 24 February 1987 (age 38) Belfort, France
- Political party: National Rally (until 2021; 2024–present); Reconquête (2021–2024)

Thibaut Monnier (French pronunciation: [tibo mɔnje]; born 24 February 1987) is a French politician who has represented the 4th constituency of Drôme in the National Assembly since 2024. He is a member of the National Rally (RN).

== Early life and career ==
From 2014 to 2016, Monnier served as departmental secretary of the National Rally in Drôme. He was a regional councillor of Auvergne-Rhône-Alpes from 2015 to 2021, and was named leader of the National Rally in Isère in 2016.

In the 2017 legislative election, he was a candidate for Isère's 8th constituency. He co-founded the Institut des sciences sociales, économiques et politiques in 2018, together with Marion Maréchal. He joined Reconquête in 2021, and was the party's candidate for Isère's 8th constituency in 2022.

In 2024 he returned to the National Rally and successfully contested Drôme's 4th constituency at the 2024 snap election.
