= Emmanuelle Anthoine =

French politician of the Republicans (born 1964)

Member of the National Assembly for Drôme's 4th constituency
- In office 21 June 2017 – 9 June 2024
- Preceded by: Nathalie Nieson

Personal details
- Born: 2 July 1964 (age 61) Saint-Vallier, France
- Party: The Republicans

Emmanuelle Anthoine (French: [ɛmanɥɛl ɑ̃twan]; born 2 July 1964) is a French politician of the Republicans who was elected to the French National Assembly on 18 June 2017, representing the 4th constituency of the department of Drôme.

== Political career ==
In parliament, Anthoine serves on the Committee on Cultural Affairs and Education. In addition to her committee assignments, she is a member of the French-Jordanian Parliamentary Friendship Group.

In the Republicans' 2017 leadership election, Anthoine endorsed Laurent Wauquiez as chairman.

Anthoine was re-elected in the 2022 French legislative election.

Ahead of the Republicans' 2022 convention, Anthoine endorsed Éric Ciotti as chairman of the party.

== See also ==
- 2017 French legislative election
- 2022 French legislative election
