= Louis Mermaz =

French politician (1931–2024)

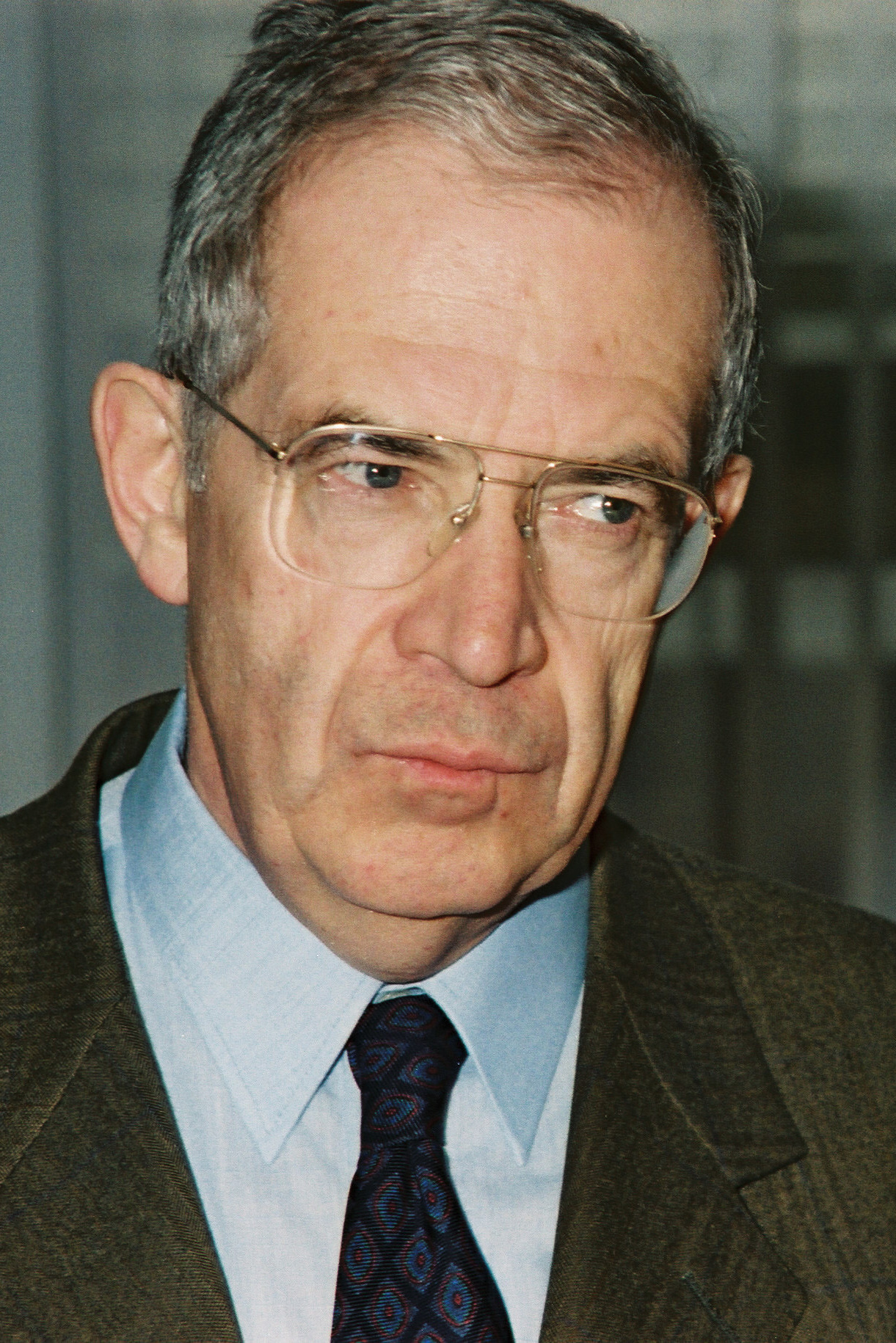
- Mermaz in 1991

President of the French National Assembly
- In office 2 July 1981 – 1 April 1986
- Preceded by: Jacques Chaban-Delmas
- Succeeded by: Jacques Chaban-Delmas

French Governmental Affairs Spokesman
- In office 1992–1993
- President: François Mitterrand
- Prime Minister: Pierre Bérégovoy
- Preceded by: Martin Malvy
- Succeeded by: Nicolas Sarkozy

Deputy for Isère's 8th constituency in the French National Assembly
- In office 1997–2001
- Preceded by: Bernard Saugey
- Succeeded by: Jacques Remiller

Personal details
- Born: 20 August 1931 Paris, France
- Died: 15 August 2024 (aged 92) Limours, France
- Party: Socialist Party

Louis Mermaz (20 August 1931 – 15 August 2024) was a French politician.

== Life and career ==
Mermaz became an ally of François Mitterrand in the late 1950s and in 1971 became a member of Mitterrand's staff in the French Socialist Party. In 1967, he was elected Deputy of Isère for the first time.

In 1981, he was appointed Minister of Transport in the first government of socialist Pierre Mauroy, before his election to Presidency of the National Assembly. He served in this office to 1986. He served as Minister of Agriculture from 1990 to 1992, and Minister of Relations with Parliament in the Bérégovoy government from 1992 to 1993. He was also Government's spokesperson in the same cabinet.

From 2001 to 2011, he was senator of Isère.

Mermaz died in Limours on 15 August 2024, at the age of 92.

Political offices
Preceded by Fernand Icart	Minister of Transport; 1981	Succeeded by Charles Fiterman
Preceded by Jacques Chaban-Delmas	President of the National Assembly; 1981–1986	Succeeded by Jacques Chaban-Delmas
Preceded by Pierre Méhaignerie	Minister of Transport; 1988	Succeeded by Michel Delebarre
Preceded by Henri Nallet	Minister of Agriculture; 1990–1992	Succeeded by Jean-Pierre Soisson
Preceded by Martin Malvy	Minister of Relations with Parliament; 1992–1993	Succeeded by Pascal Clément; Roger Romani
Preceded by Martin Malvy	Government's spokesperson 1992–1993	Succeeded by Nicolas Sarkozy
