= Confédération Générale des Syndicats Indépendants =

The General Confederation of Independent Trade Unions (CGSI) was a French trade union confederation created in the aftermath of World War II. It disappeared in the 1970s. The CGSI was active in sectors such as the automobile industry, the postal service, and the City of Paris administration.

== History ==
=== The Economic and Trade Union Studies Committee (1947–1949) ===
The Economic and Trade Union Studies Committee (Comité d’études économiques et syndicales, CEES) was founded in January 1947 by unionists from the pre-war "Syndicat" faction of the CGT, led by René Belin. Many of its members had participated in organizations created under the Labor Charter of October 4, 1941. Rejecting the dominance of communist militants within the CGT, they published the bulletin Travail et Liberté.

Despite some initial success, particularly among groups compromised during the Collaboration, the CEES was quickly eclipsed by the creation of Workers' Force (CGT-FO), which attracted most of the non-communist unionists. Many other unions, such as the FEN and SNUI, chose to remain independent. Additionally, CGT-FO refused to admit former collaborators, further marginalizing CEES.

=== General Confederation of Independent Trade Unions (1949–1959) ===
The CGSI was formed by uniting former CEES members, activists from the Gaullist Action Ouvrière, and unions linked to the French Social Party (PSF). Initially named the "Confédération du travail indépendante," it was renamed in 1951 to avoid confusion with the Confédération des travailleurs intellectuels. It became the General Confederation of Independent Trade Unions (CGSI).

The CGSI's secretary-general was Sulpice Dewez, a former CGTU unionist and communist deputy who had voted to grant full powers to Philippe Pétain but later joined the French Resistance. His deputies were Martin Leymarie, a close associate of René Belin, and Manuel Bridier, a member of the RPF.

In March 1951, the CGSI secured a seat on the Economic and Social Council. With support from Paris Police Prefect Jean Baylot, it began recruiting supervisory staff in automobile factories to counter the dominance of the CGT among workers. At Simca, the CGSI received significant backing from CEO Henri Théodore Pigozzi, making the Simca Independent Union the CGSI's most prominent affiliate.

Conflicts over leadership soon emerged, centering on Sulpice Dewez and André Parsal. At the CGSI congress in Lyon in October 1952, a split occurred, with the "CGSI-Parsal" faction breaking away to form the Confédération syndicale Travail et Liberté (CSTL). Subsequent defections weakened the CGSI, as many joined the CSTL, which became the Confédération française des syndicats indépendants in 1957.

=== Decline and Dissolution ===
The CGSI fractured further during the presidency of Charles de Gaulle. The remnants split into two factions: "CGSI-Dewez" and "CGSI-Jacquet," led by Christian Jacquet. The Dewez faction eventually merged with the CFTC in 1976. The Jacquet faction, with support from the Simca union, joined the CSTL to form the French Confederation of Labor (CFT).

== Bibliography ==
- Didier Favre, Ni rouges ni jaunes: De la CGSI à la CSL, Midi moins le Quart, 1998.
