= Action Ouvrière =

Trade union in France created in 1948

Action Ouvrière was a trade union organization created in 1948 and affiliated with the Rally of the French People (RPF), the political movement founded by Charles de Gaulle. Its creation was part of the Gaullists' strategy to establish a foothold in the labor movement and challenge left-wing unions, particularly the CGT, which was dominated by communists.

The union's primary leaders were Louis Vallon and Yvon Morandat.

== Sociological base ==
Created in 1948, the union had approximately 140,000 members by the end of the same year. Its membership base consisted primarily of managers and foremen, but it also included a significant number of workers (46.7%), demonstrating the RPF's ability to attract diverse social groups.

== Political positioning and ideology ==
Charles de Gaulle envisioned Action Ouvrière as a tool to promote his vision of nationalism that incorporated the working class and transcended class conflict. However, the union quickly positioned itself to the left of the Gaullist movement, evolving from corporatist ideals to advocating for co-management and associational policies. This ideological shift generated some mistrust among the RPF leadership.

=== Press organs ===
Action Ouvrière operated several publications to disseminate RPF ideals among workers:

- L’Étincelle – the RPF's internal weekly bulletin (April 26, 1947, to January 24, 1948)
- Le Rassemblement – the RPF's weekly publication (January 31, 1948, to June 30, 1954)
- L’Étincelle ouvrière – a weekly newsletter for workers affiliated with the RPF (August 9, 1947, to February 5, 1948)
- Le Rassemblement ouvrier – the central weekly publication for workplace groups within the RPF (February 12 to November 24, 1950).

=== Anti-Communism as a core principle ===
Beginning in 1947, communist networks in France launched a major wave of strikes. Action Ouvrière criticized these movements for their overt politicization, accusing the CGT of prioritizing political goals over workers' material interests. The RPF's publication, L'Étincelle ouvrière, condemned the CGT as serving the interests of the Kominform and the Soviet Union, rather than French workers.

By 1950, Action Ouvrière argued that communist political agendas, rather than genuine grievances, were driving most strikes. The union accused the CGT of using labor struggles to support the USSR and radicalize the workforce.

=== Advocacy for public services ===
In 1948, Jacques Baumel provided clear guidance on how Gaullists should engage with labor movements:

We must fight because it is impossible to remain uninvolved in an event as significant as a strike.

Baumel instructed members to spread Gaullist ideas, particularly within public services, but emphasized that vital public services should not be paralyzed by strikes. A circular from Action Ouvrière stated:

Strikes and the interruption of vital public services for the nation are unacceptable in a state worthy of the name.

=== National guidelines for social well-being ===
Applying Gaullist principles, the RPF discouraged Gaullists from acting as strikebreakers. Instead, they were instructed to support legitimate labor actions while resisting communist influence. Baumel outlined these principles:

Never lead a strike [...] do not condemn justified demands [...] you are not yellow unions: if a strike occurs, you must join it while keeping it purely professional [...] demand secret ballot votes, oppose sabotage, and reject solidarity strikes.

This approach sought to maintain a professional focus in labor disputes while avoiding political manipulation by communists.

=== Fear of political revolution ===
The Gaullist movement aimed to limit political strikes to prevent regime destabilization. While advocating constitutional reform, Gaullists sought to maintain a legalistic path to change. De Gaulle argued that institutional stagnation, rather than economic hardship, was the root cause of social unrest.

=== Capital-Labor Association ===
One of the RPF's key proposals was the Capital-Labor Association, a precursor to modern profit-sharing schemes. De Gaulle envisioned a system where employees would participate in company capital ownership. This idea later influenced French labor laws, such as the 1967 ordinance on employee profit-sharing.

== Decline ==
Historian Bernard Lachaise attributes the decline of Action Ouvrière to several factors:

- 1. International context: The stabilization of global tensions during the early Cold War, the death of Stalin, and the end of the Korean War diminished the perceived threat of communism.
- 2. National dynamics: The RPF's internal division and eventual dissolution weakened its affiliated organizations.
- 3. Shift in unionism: The end of post-war reconstruction and a significant decline in union membership (even the CGT lost nearly half its members in five years) reduced the relevance of Action Ouvrière.
