= Gabriel Biancheri =

French politician

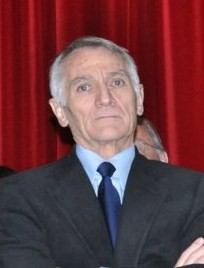

Gabriel Biancheri (1 October 1943 – 28 December 2010) was a French politician who was a member of the National Assembly. He represented the 4th constituency of the Drôme department, as a member of the Union for a Popular Movement, from 2002 until his death in 2010. He was succeeded in the constituency by his substitute in the 2007 election, Marie-Hélène Thoraval.
