= Annie David =

French politician

Annie David (born 17 January 1963) is a French politician who served as a Senator for Isère from 2001 to 2017. A member of the French Communist Party, she was a Communist, Republican, and Citizen group during her tenure. David is a native of La Tronche, Isère and has been a municipal coucillorof Villard-Bonnot since 2001. She was elected to the Senate in 2001 and reelected in 2011.

== Biography ==
An IT buyer by profession and CGT representative at HP, Annie David joined the French Communist Party in 1996 and was elected municipal councilor of Villard-Bonnot in the 2001 municipal elections. On September 23, 2001, she was elected senator for Isère and became the youngest member of the Senate (France).

In 2004, she was elected vice-chair of the Delegation for Women's Rights and Equal Opportunities for Men and Women, and in 2007, vice-chair of the Senate's Social Affairs Committee.

She was re-elected senator in the 2011 elections, when, for the first time in the French Fifth Republic, the upper house was controlled by a left-wing majority. She then became chair of the Social Affairs Committee.

== Bibliography ==
- Page on the Senate website
