= Claude Rajon =

French politician

- Born: June 2, 1866; Vienne, Isère, France
- Died: October 3, 1932; La Folatière, Isère, France
- Occupation: Politician

Claude Rajon (1866–1932) was a French politician. He served as a member of the Chamber of Deputies from 1897 to 1910, and from 1914 to 1919, as well as a member of the French Senate from 1921 to 1932, representing Isère.
