= Joseph Vallier =

French lawyer and politician

- Born: 27 May 1869; Grenoble, Isère, France
- Died: 26 August 1935 (aged 66)
- Occupation(s): Lawyer, politician

Joseph Vallier (1869-1935) was a French lawyer and politician. He served as a member of the French Senate from 1920 to 1935, representing Isère.
