= Yellow socialism =

Alternative to the "Red socialism" advocated in Marxism

Yellow socialism, or yellow unionism, was an economic system proposed in 1902 in France by Pierre Biétry, as an alternative to the "red socialism" advocated in Marxism. Biétry envisioned workers organizing unions which would operate in parallel with groups of businesses (a structure similar to corporatism). Workers would get a greater share of company profits through negotiation between each union and the corresponding business group. Above this would be a strong authoritarian State.

Yellow socialism was prominent in France until World War I, competing with Marxism for support among workers. The name "yellow socialism" was also a Marxist term of abuse for perceived right-wing socialists. After World War I, the term "yellow socialism" fell into disuse.

== History ==
Pierre Biétry had been a member of the Marxist French Workers' Party until his departure in 1900. Disappointed by the failure of "Red socialism" to improve the condition of the workers, he now advocated cooperation between organized labor and capitalist businesses. He called this "Yellow socialism", as a deliberate contrast to Marxist "Red socialism". In 1902, he founded the Fédération nationale des Jaunes de France ("National Federation of Yellows of France" - FNJF). Later, affiliated Swiss and German "Yellow" groups formed. All the "Yellow" groups were strongly opposed to Marxism.

The FNJF gained some support among more conservative workers when strikes by unions of the "Red" Confédération générale du travail (CGT) included violence.

In the next few years, Biétry added antisemitism to the FNJF program, and the FNJF became entangled with the reactionary French right wing. Some of its members and organizers joined Action Française; other returned to the CGT. The FNJF held its last congress in 1909. Biétry went to Indochina and died there in 1918.

The "Yellow socialist" label was appropriated by Marxist Reds to describe any socialist whom the Reds considered as on the side of the ruling class: that is, all non-Marxist socialists, whether they used the "Yellow" label or not. The Red usage thus included many whose ideas would later be known as social democracy and democratic socialism, concepts very different from those of Biétry.

In the United States, "Yellow socialism" was associated with the business unionism of Samuel Gompers (and thus described as "Yellow unionism"). Business unionism was based on the belief that the workers' best option was to form a labor cartel within a capitalist society.

Marxists criticized "Yellow" socialists and unionists for nationalism, and also for perceived occasional engagement in ethnic and racial chauvinism. This was seen in "Yellow" opposition to immigration, because competition from immigrants reduced wages or took jobs from native-born workers, and sometimes even racism including antisemitism.

In Europe, during World War I, Marxists associated the social democratic parties with "Yellow socialism", as they supported their own nations in the war rather than taking an internationalist position against the conflict. However, these parties had no connection to Biétry's thinking.

The Berne International, formed with the Zimmerwald Conference in 1915, was similarly described as "Yellow socialist" by Vladimir Lenin for its rejection of revolutionary socialism, despite its opposition to the war.
