= Joseph Brenier =

French politician (1876–1943)

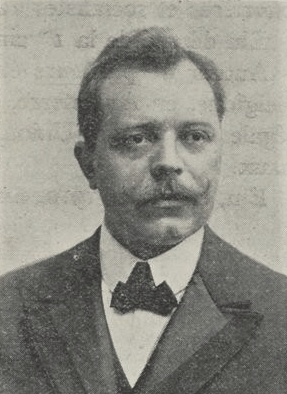
- Born: 23 April 1876; Vienne, Isère, France
- Died: 30 December 1943 (aged 67); Lyon, France
- Occupation: Politician
- Political party: SFIO

Joseph Brenier (1876–1943) was a French politician. He served as the mayor of Vienne from 1906 to 1919. He served as a member of the Chamber of Deputies from 1909 to 1914, and as a member of the French Senate from 1924 to 1933, representing Isère. He became a Knight of the Legion of Honour in 1935.
