= Jean Faure =

French politician (1937–2022)

Member of Senate
- In office 25 September 1983 – 30 September 2011
- Constituency: Isère

Personal details
- Born: 14 January 1937 Autrans, France
- Died: 13 May 2022 (aged 85) France
- Party: Union for French Democracy; Union for a Popular Movement

Jean Faure (14 January 1937 – 13 May 2022) was a French politician who served as member of the Senate of France. He represented the Isère department and was a member of the Union for a Popular Movement Party. He served in French Army in Algeria during the Algerian War from 1957 to 1958.

== Bibliography ==
- Page on the Senate website
