= René Belin =

French trade unionist and politician

- Born: 14 April 1898; Bourg-en-Bresse, Ain, France
- Died: 2 January 1977 (aged 78); Lorrez-le-Bocage, Seine-et-Marne, France
- Occupation: Trade unionist

René Belin (French pronunciation: [ʁəne bəlɛ̃]; 14 April 1898 – 2 January 1977) was a French trade unionist and politician. In the 1930s he became one of the leaders of the French General Confederation of Labour.

He was strongly opposed to communism. In the prelude to World War II (1939–45) he favored a policy of appeasement. After the defeat of France, he was Minister of Industrial Production and Minister of Labour in the collaborationist Vichy Government, holding the latter office until April 1942. He oversaw the destruction of unionism. As a result, he was expelled from the CGT in 1944. After the war he tried to form an anti-communist union movement, but with limited success.

== Life ==
=== Pre-war ===
René Belin was born on 14 April 1898 at Bourg-en-Bresse, Ain.

Belin was a clerk at the telephone company, then a writer at the PTT (Posts, Telegraphs, and Telephones) in 1920. In 1926 he became secretary of the Confédération Générale du Travail (CGT: General Confederation of Labour) union of postal workers in the Lyon region. He then became secretary of the national federation of the PTT. He was dismissed in 1930 for going on strike. In 1933 he joined the national office of the CGT as permanent secretary, with Léon Jouhaux. After the PTT was reunified in 1935, Belin opposed the Communist faction. He gathered like-minded activists around the journal Syndicats, whose purpose he defined as resistance to communist colonization.

During the Munich Crisis in September 1938 Belin endorsed Édouard Daladier's policy of appeasement and revision of the Treaty of Versailles. At the November 1938 national meeting of the CGT in Nantes Belin obtained the support of one third of the attendees for a pacifist and violently anti-communist resolution. Belin had no difficulty in getting the communists excluded from the CGT after the signature of the Molotov–Ribbentrop Pact in August 1939. Georges Bonnet, together with his allies in the "peace lobby" both within and without the government such as Anatole de Monzie, Jean Mistler, Marcel Déat, Paul Faure, Paul Baudouin, Pierre Laval, René Belin, Adrien Marquet, and Gaston Bergery, all spent 1–3 September 1939 lobbying the Daladier government, the Senate and the Chamber against going to war with Germany.

=== World War II ===
During World War II (1939–1945), after the defeat of France in June 1940 Belin said it was necessary to completely rethink unionism within the national framework. He resigned from the CGT national office soon afterwards. He was appointed Minister of Industrial Production and Minister of Labour in Marshal Philippe Pétain's government on 12 July 1940. He appointed Jean Bichelonne and Henri Lafond to the two senior positions in the ministry. In November 1940 he signed a decree dissolving the trade unions. He also helped restore the economic order of France after the defeat.

Under German pressure Belin handed over the Ministry of Industrial Production in February 1941, but remained the Minister of Labour. He developed the Charte du travail (Charter of Labour), a compromise between retaining some autonomy for unions and complete "corporatization" of the economy in the Fascist model. There was now just one union, with mandatory membership, no right to strike and no social insurance funds. Workers' social committees were excluded from the union, and became a strong competitor. On 18 April 1942 Belin was forced out of office. In 1944 he was thrown out of the CGT as the "principal architect of union destruction."

=== Later career ===
After the war, René Belin was involved in 1947 with the creation of the Confédération du Travail indépendant (CTI), renamed Confédération Générale des Syndicats Indépendants (CGSI) in 1949 as the original acronym was already used by Confédération des Travailleurs intellectuels. The movement was joined by former members of the Confédération des syndicats professionnels français, a union created by François de La Rocque in 1936. The CGSI declared that it was formed by "men of different origins who agreed to denounce the malfeasance of the communist CGT". CGSI developed mostly in the automobile industry, for instance in the Simca factory of Poissy.

René Belin died on 2 January 1977 at Lorrez-le-Bocage.

== Sources ==
- Adamthwaite, Anthony (1977). France and the Coming of the Second World War. London: Frank Cass.
- Claudel, Paul (2014). "BELIN RENÉ (1898-1977)". Encyclopædia Universalis [online].
- Irvine, William (1998). "Domestic Politics and the Fall of France in 1940"". In Joel Blatt (ed.). The French Defeat of 1940. Providence: Berghahn Books.
- Loubet, Jean-Louis; Hatzfeld, Nicolas (2002). "POISSY: DE LA CGT À LA CFT – HISTOIRE D'UNE USINE ATYPIQUE". Vingtième Siècle. Revue d'histoire (73).
- Nord, Philip (2012-08-26), France's New Deal: From the Thirties to the Postwar Era, Princeton University Press, ISBN 978-1-4008-3496-9.
- "Special Issue". Le Syndicaliste Indépendant. March 1956.
