= Pierre Biétry =

French politician

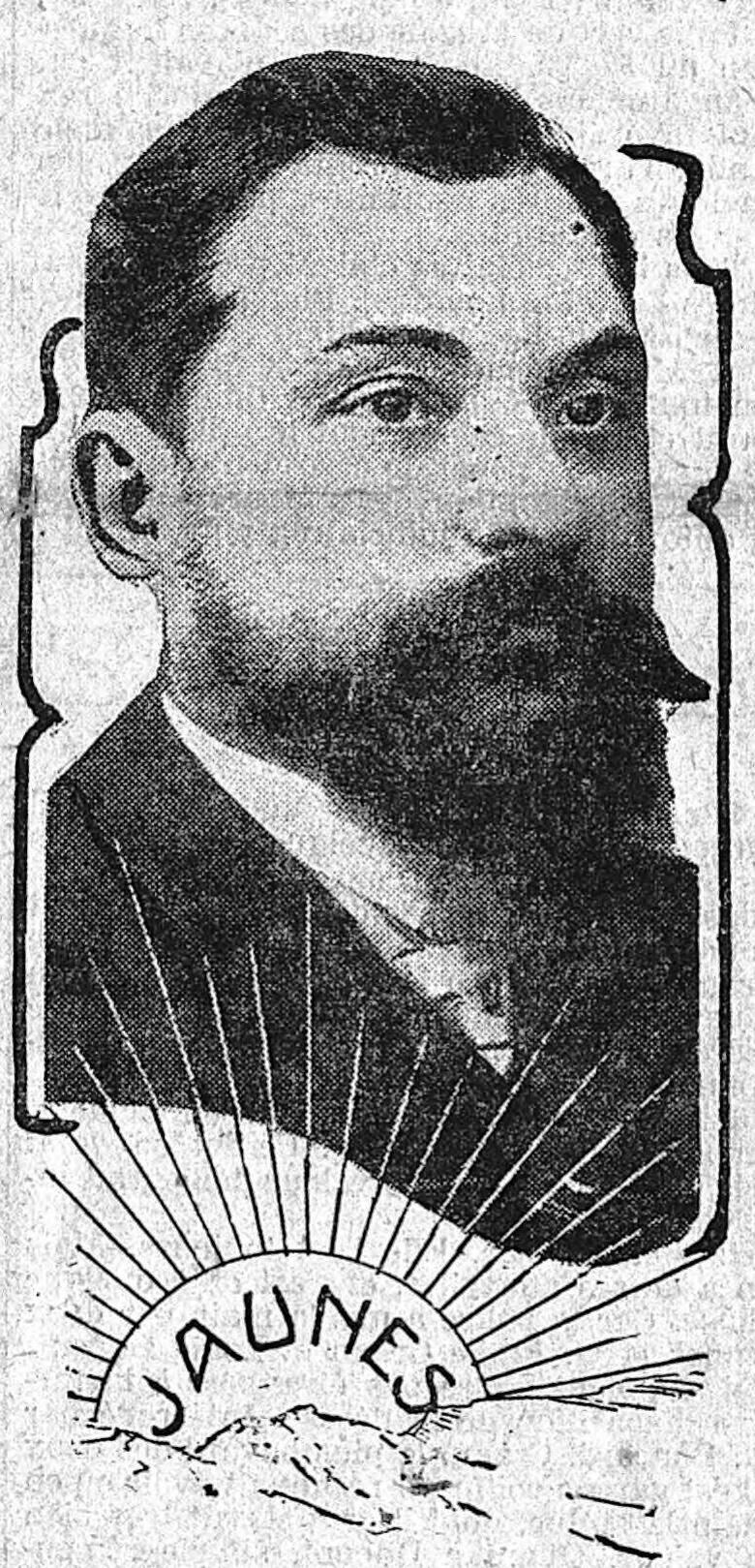
Picture of him taken in 1902.

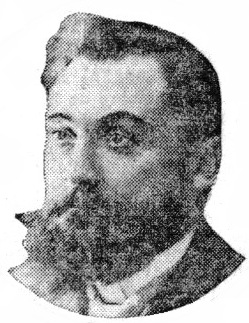
From Le Petit Parisien December 29, 1908.

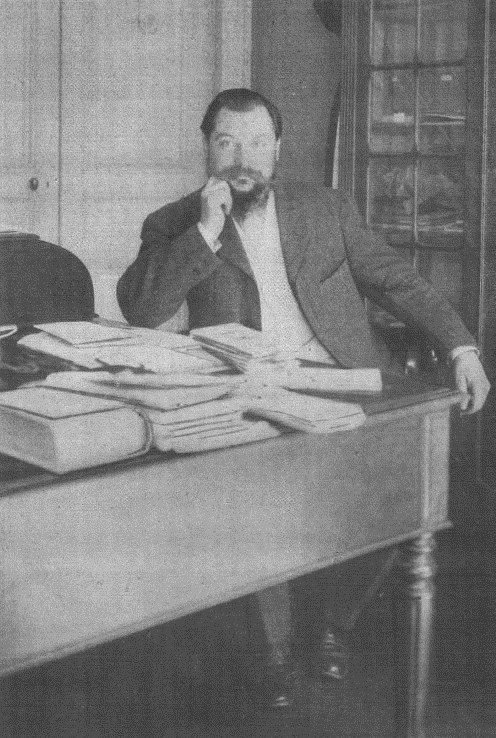
Full picture of Pierre Biétry, taken in 1909.

Pierre Biétry (French: [bjetʁi]; 9 May 1872 – 3 December 1918) was a French syndicalist and politician who initially followed orthodox socialism before pioneering the "yellow socialist" movement of the early 20th century.

He was also the maternal grandfather of journalist and White House Press Secretary Pierre Salinger.

== Early life and socialist activity ==
Born in Fêche-l'Église, he moved to Algeria as a 13-year-old and stayed four years in the colony before returning home. He then became a member of the French Workers' Party (POF) and was praised in its paper, Le Socialiste, for his activity in Franche-Comté. He was also for a time associated with the followers of Jules Guesde.

He was active in a series of strikes between 1898 and 1901 and even led a march of workers in Paris in 1899.

== Ideological shift ==
His break with socialism occurred around then, largely as a result of his opposition to the idea of a general strike as well as his overall disillusionment with the failure of socialist activity in France. Coupled with his advocacy of class co-operation to alleviate working class suffering, that made him quit the POF in 1900. He came to advocate non-political trade union activity and a corporatist relationship between the unions and the employers. He formed his own trade union, the Fédération nationale des jaunes de France in 1902. As a political arm to his union he also formed the National Socialist Party in 1903. Initially the new movement was fairly low-key, but it gained a surge in support in 1910–11 after a series of violent acts by the Confédération générale du travail led to many more conservative workers deserting their ranks. Biétry's somewhat unusual approach to politics and his muddied ideology earned him widespread coverage in the press, which reported him as something of an oddity.

According to his grandson Pierre Salinger, he was a deputy at the French National Assembly from 1906 to 1910, where his "highlight" was his "vigorous" and "heated" defense of Alfred Dreyfus when the latter was (falsely) accused of stealing military secrets.

He became attracted to the antisemitism of Édouard Drumont and soon grafted it on to his corporatist anti-capitalism. His Jaunes movement surprisingly won the support of traditionally-conservative figures such as Victor Henri Rochefort and Paul Déroulède who were attracted to Biétry's patriotism as well as Drumont. He briefly enjoyed the support of Action Française, but Biétry's headstrong personality meant that was short-lived as it had hoped to dominate his movement. He was elected to Parliament in the 1906 election.

== Later life ==
Ultimately, Biétry's period of influence proved short-lived as Charles Maurras and his followers became the main focus of agitation on the right. Les Jaunes held a final congress in 1909, and he declined to run again in the 1910 election. Biétry left France in 1914 to manage a rubber plantation in Indochina. According to his grandson Pierre Salinger this move was because he had "fallen for another woman". Biétry reportedly maltreated his workers on the plantation. He died in Saigon in late 1918.
