= Charte du travail =

French labour law

Labor Charter
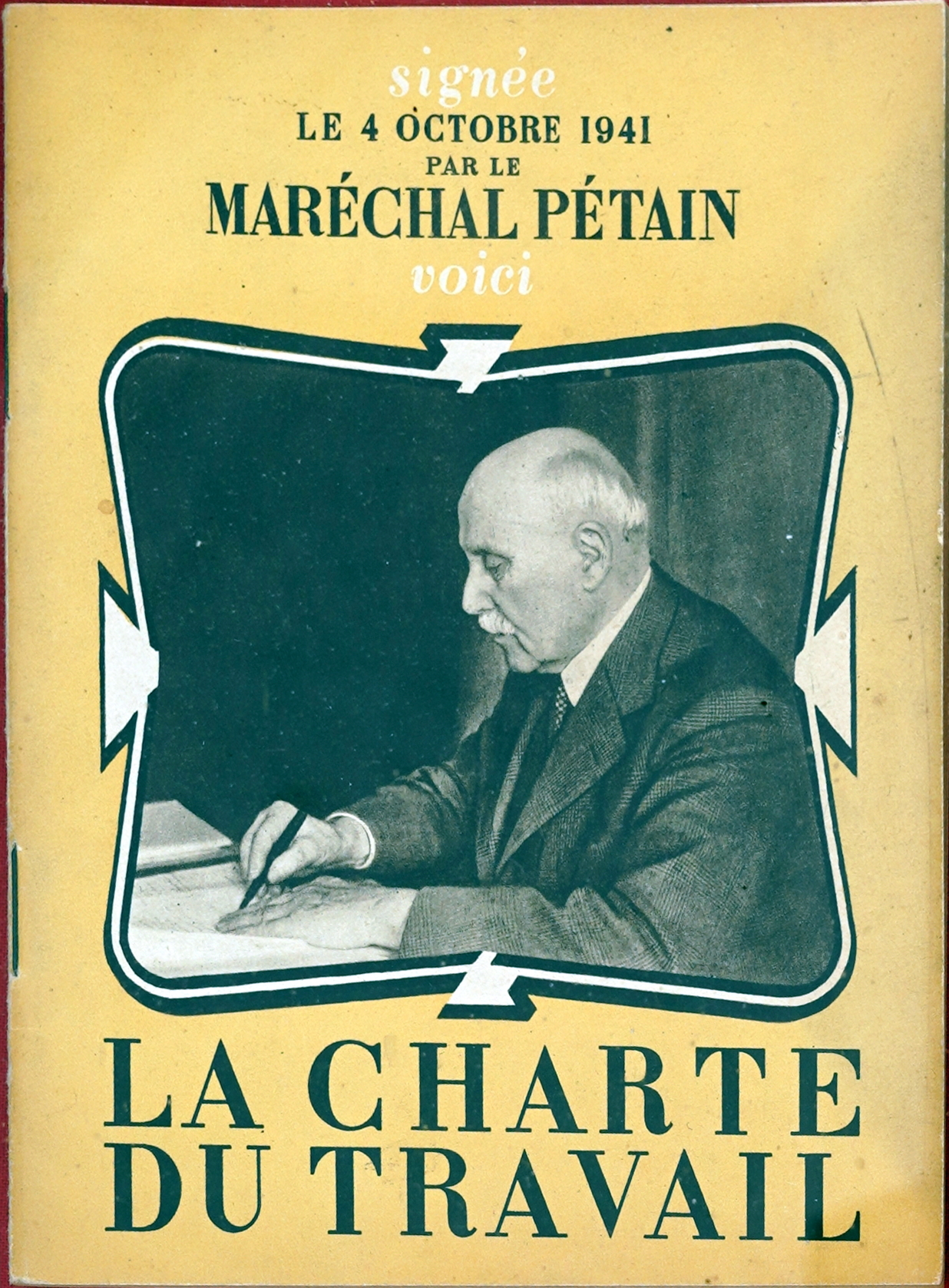
- Long title: Law on the Social Organization of Professions
- Signed: October 4, 1941

Repealed by
- Ordinance of the Provisional Government of the French Republic on July 27, 1944

Full text
- Charte du travail at Wikisource
- Status: Repealed

The Labor Charter (French: Charte du travail) was a French law on labor law in France, signed on 4 October 1941, by the Vichy regime under the German occupation of France. It sought to reorganize labor relations by abolishing class struggle and promoting collaboration between workers and employers.

The Charter was repealed by an ordinance of the Provisional Government of the French Republic on 27 July 1944.

== Background ==
=== Dissolution of Unions (November 1940) ===
The Vichy regime began reorganizing labor relations with the law of 16 August 1940, which established organization committees for industrial and commercial sectors. This was followed by decrees issued on 9 November 1940, dissolving major trade unions and employer groups.

The unions affected included:

- Confédération générale du travail (CGT)
- Confédération française des travailleurs chrétiens (CFTC)
- Confédération des syndicats professionnels français (CSPF)

Major employer organizations dissolved included:

- Confédération générale du patronat français (CGPF)
- Comité des forges
- Comité central des houillères de France

=== Influences ===
The Labor Charter was influenced by several ideological and social trends:

- Syndicalist advocates close to the Ministry of Labor, led by René Belin, who sought class collaboration.
- The corporatist model of Benito Mussolini's Italy, which was more authoritarian.
- Social Catholicism, particularly the work of René de La Tour du Pin, which emphasized corporate harmony.
- Reactionary anti-Enlightenment and anti-revolutionary traditions that opposed unionism and sought a return to pre-revolutionary systems.
- Economic models like those of António de Oliveira Salazar's Portugal, which emphasized employer-employee associations.

Marshal Pétain often addressed social issues in his speeches, emphasizing the need for professional collaboration and national unity.

== Development ==
The drafting of the Charter involved compromises between proponents of syndicalist-based corporatism and traditional corporatist supporters close to Pétain. Ultimately, the task of drafting the final version was given to Gaston Cèbe, a special advisor to the Council Presidency.

=== Adoption ===
The final version was adopted by the Council of Ministers on 4 October 1941, and published in the Journal Officiel on 26 October 1941.

== Provisions ==
The Charter introduced professional "families," or corporations, organized by industry. These included mandatory single unions and works councils to manage workplace relations. It also prohibited strikes and lockouts (Article 5) and introduced the concept of a minimum living wage (Article 54).

== Legacy ==
The Charter served as a precursor to the post-war works councils and labor relations systems established after the Liberation. However, its implementation during the Vichy regime faced significant resistance, and its corporatist vision failed to gain widespread acceptance.
