= Union Nationale Inter-universitaire =

French University organization

The Union Nationale Inter-universitaire (French: [ynjɔ̃ nasjɔnal ɛ̃tɛʁynivɛʁsitɛʁ]; UNI) or "Inter-University Union" is the largest French right-wing union of university students, created in February 1969 to promote freedom of expression in reaction to the student crisis of May 68 and to support the political action of President Charles de Gaulle.

Logo

== History ==
The UNI was founded in order to expand the conservative and the right-wing influence in the French university after the May 1968 events. It was created under the initiative of the Service d'Action Civique, a secret service used by the right-wing gaullist movement, in particular by Robert Pandraud, Charles Pasqua and Jacques Foccart; the Service d'Action Civique was dissolved in 1982 by the socialist government.

The Inter-University Union has always been strongly anti-communist and anti-socialist opposing the numerous left-wing student groups that exist in the French universities. Since its foundation, the UNI claims to be a movement of activists, activism being the main mission of the organization along with the participation to the elections of the students' representatives within the French universities. The union also uses to position itself within the national political debate strongly opposing communism, affirmative action and cannabis legalization.

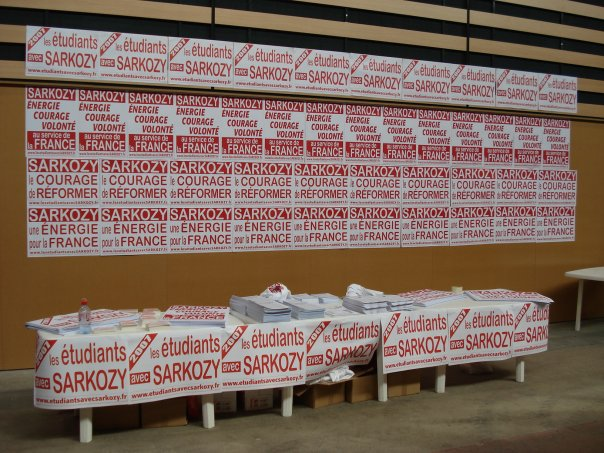
UNI table during Nicolas Sarkozy's campaign meeting in Lyon (April 2007)

It received $575,000 between April 1984 and April 1985 from the government of the United States through the National Endowment for Democracy and was also supported by Irving Brown, leader of the international relations of the AFL–CIO and a CIA contractee.

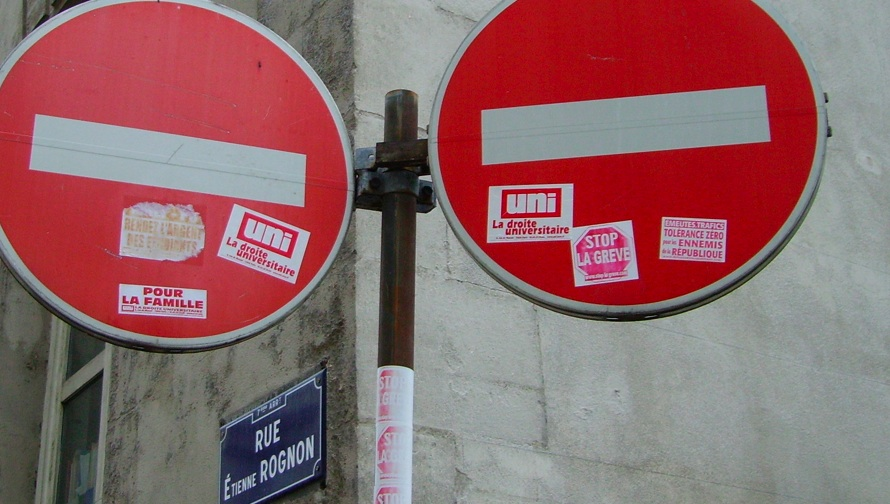
UNI stickers near the Institut d'études politiques de Lyon, Lyon, France

Starting from 1995, UNI has supported president Jacques Chirac against the French Socialist Party. Its anti-socialist position pushed the UNI to get closer to the RPR and now to the UMP, the main French right-wing party. Some of its members also belong to the Movement for France, a more traditionalist conservative political party. UNI activists often participate to UMP rallies even though the two organizations do remain independent.

During the 2005 French European Constitution referendum, the union was strongly divided between eurosceptic and pro-European activists. The UNI leaders finally decided to support the European Constitution, while a big part of the union's activists campaigned against it. This event pushed some members out of the union, leading to the creation of a new right-wing student union, more nationalist and traditionalist, the Rassemblement des Etudiants de Droite (Rally of the Right-wing Students). In the 2007 French Presidential election, the UNI has strongly supported the conservative candidate Nicolas Sarkozy even though some of its members preferred campaigning for the catholic traditionalist, eurosceptic and anti-immigration candidate, Philippe de Villiers.

== Famous former members of the UNI ==
- President Nicolas Sarkozy and Prime Minister François Fillon were both members of the UNI when they were studying at the university.
- Michèle Alliot-Marie, Jean-François Copé, Roger Karoutchi, Éric Raoult, Renaud Muselier, Laurent Wauquiez, Christian Jacob, Christian Vanneste, Bernard Debré, Jean-Paul Delevoye and Xavier Bertrand are also former members of the UNI.
