= Bernard Saugey =

French politician

Bernard Saugey (born 3 March 1943 in Lyon) is a French politician who served as a member of the Senate of France between 2001 and 2017, representing the Isère department. He is a member of the Union for a Popular Movement.
