= 2012 Martine Aubry presidential campaign =

Martine Aubry 2012
- Campaign: Socialist Primaries 2011
- Candidate: Martine Aubry
- Affiliation: Socialist Party
- Status: Lost election, 16 October 2011
- Key people: François Lamy (Manager); Anne Hidalgo (Spokesman); Olivier Dussopt (Spokesman); J-M Germain (Chief of Staff)

Website
- Martineaubry.fr

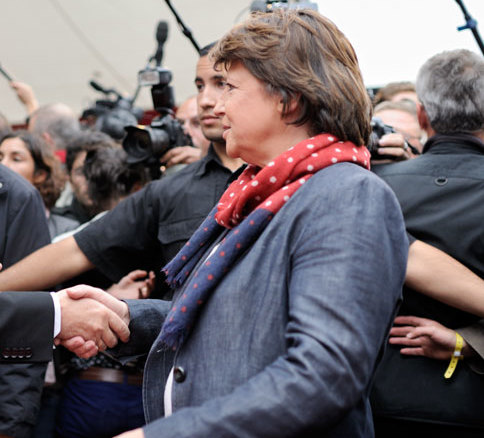
Aubry campaigning in September 2011

First Secretary of the Socialist Party Martine Aubry began a campaign for the Socialist Party and Radical Party of Left presidential primary, 2011 for President of France in June 2011. Aubry announced she was running for president during a meeting in former train station of Lille-Saint-Sauveur held on 28 June 2011.

She was the candidate with the most time in Government. Representing the party's left-wing, she made it to the run-offs and lost the nomination to François Hollande.

== Speculation about presidential run ==
Since her election over Ségolène Royal as head of the Socialist Party in 2008, Aubry has become a qualified candidate for the presidential election.

The victories of her party in regional elections in 2010 and cantonal elections in 2011 make her the natural candidate of the party for the next presidential election.

In 2010 the principal contenders, Martine Aubry and Dominique Strauss-Kahn, agreed between themselves the so-called "Marrakech pact" (pacte de Marrakech) whereby each undertook eventually to give way to the candidate best placed in the opinion polls, which at that time was Strauss-Kahn. Towards the end of June 2011, the final candidate would be announced a few days prior to the nomination deadline.

On 3 May 2011, Le Nouvel Observateur reported that Aubry had told her closest supporters she would not be putting her name forward and would support Strauss-Kahn, the clear favorite in the opinions polls. Aubry denied the story, visibly upset, saying that France expected something different. Several days later, Stauss-Kahn's arrest on charges of sexual assault and attempted rape revived interest in her candidacy. On 22 May Aubry said she would accept her responsibilities when the time came, without nevertheless putting her name forward at the same time.

== Campaign trail ==
=== Announcement ===
On 28 June 2011 Aubry said in a televised address from the northern town of Lille " I have decided to propose my candidacy to the presidential election ".

=== Polls ===
Recent polls give Martine Aubry elbow to elbow with François Hollande in socialist primary.

=== Proposals and statements ===
She publicly denouncing rumours that are proliferating on the internet about her husband, her health and her private life, she threatens to complain if these rumors persist.

During the Festival d'Avignon, she proposes to increase the budget for culture by 30% or 50%. Aubry finally supported the proposal of her main rival François Hollande to reduce the public deficit to 3% of GDP in 2013.

== Endorsement ==
=== Former prime ministers ===
Laurent Fabius, Pierre Mauroy;

=== Former ministers ===
Claude Bartolone, Robert Chapuis, Jacques Delors, Tony Dreyfus, Henri Emmanuelli, Jean Glavany, Élisabeth Guigou, Paulette Guinchard, Charles Josselin, André Laignel, Jack Lang, Marylise Lebranchu, Marie-Noëlle Lienemann, Martin Malvy, Paul Quiles, Alain Richard, René Souchon, Catherine Tasca, Catherine Trautmann;

=== MP's, mayors, presidents of regional and general councils ===
Jean-Claude Antonini, Alain Anziani, Arlette Arnaud-Landau, David Assouline, Jacques Auxiette, Gérard Bapt, Christian Bataille, Marie-Noëlle Battistel, Laurent Beauvais, Gisèle Biémouret, Patrick Bloche, François Bonneau, Jean-Michel Boucheron, Christophe Bouillon, Jean-Claude Boulard, François Brottes, Marie-Odile Bouillé, Jean-Claude Boulard, Pierre Bourguignon, Pascal Buchet, Jean-Christophe Cambadélis, Alain Cacheux, Christophe Caresche, Françoise Cartron, Laurent Cathala, Bernard Cazeau, Jean-Paul Chanteguet, Alain Claeys, Gilles Cocquempot, Pierre Cohen, Catherine Coutelle, Pascale Crozon, Yves Dauge, Michel-François Delannoy, Bertrand Delanoë, Daniel Delaveau, François Deluga, Gilles Demailly, Jean-Pierre Demerliat, Harlem Désir, Jean-Louis Destans, Michel Destot, Michel Dinet, Jean-Pierre Dufau, Marie-Marguerite Dufay, Laurence Dumont, Jean-Louis Dumont, Dominique Dupilet, Yves Durand, Philippe Duron, Olivier Dussopt, Christian Eckert, Corinne Erhel, Martine Faure, Hervé Féron, Pierre Forgues, Valérie Fourneyron, Jean-Claude Frécon, Jean-Louis Gagnaire, Jean Gaubert, Charles Gautier, Catherine Génisson, Claude Gewerc, Samia Ghali, Daniel Goldberg, Jean-Noël Guérini, David Habib, Adeline Hazan, Jean-Paul Huchon, Liem Hoang Ngoc, Sandrine Hurel, Jean-Louis Idiart, Françoise Imbert, Michel Issindou, Serge Janquin, Annie Jarraud-Vergnolle, Henri Jibrayel, Patrice Joly, Régis Juanico, Marietta Karamanli, Bariza Khiari, Conchita Lacuey, François Lamy, Colette Langlade, Philippe Lavaud, Patrick Lebreton, Dominique Lefebvre, Patrick Lemasle, Catherine Lemorton, Jean-Claude Leroy, Alain Le Vern, François Loncle, Philippe Madrelle, Bruno Magnier, Jean Mallot, Hélène Mandroux, Jacqueline Maquet, Marie-Lou Marcel, Marie-Claude Marchand, Didier Marie, Jean-René Marsac, Philippe Martin, Martine Martinel, Frédérique Massat, Marc Massion, Didier Mathus, Alain Maurice, Sandrine Mazetier, Rachel Mazuir, Kléber Mesquida, Jean Michel, Jean-Pierre Michel, Pierre-Alain Muet, Alain Néri, Marie-Renée Oget, Christian Paul, Germinal Peiro, Jean-Luc Perat, Marie-Françoise Pérol-Dumont, Jean-Claude Peyronnet, Martine Pinville, Philippe Plisson, François Pupponi, Paul Raoult, Marie-Line Reynaud, Marcel Rogemont, Yves Rome, Jean-Pierre Sueur, Simon Sutour, Michel Teston, René Vandierendonck, André Vantomme, Michel Vergnier, André Vézinhet, Alain Vidalies, Jean-Claude Villemain, Jean-Claude Viollet, Henri Weber, Richard Yung;

=== Politicians ===
Pouria Amirshahi, Gilbert Annette, Pascale Boistard, Christophe Borgel, Charlotte Brun, Gwenegan Bui, Philippe Buisson, Philippe Darriulat, Michel Dasseux, Antoine Détourné, Josette Durrieu, Gérard Filoche, Marie-Pierre de La Gontrie, Thérèse Guilbert, Caroline De Haas, Razzy Hammadi, Benoît Hamon, Anne Hidalgo, Patrick Jeanne, David Lebon, Emmanuel Maurel, Gilles Pargneaux, Claude Roiron, Barbara Romagnan, Laurence Rossignol

=== Others ===
Laure Adler, Jean-Pierre Azéma, Christian Baudelot, Yamina Benguigui, Sandrine Bonnaire, Catherine Clément, Daniel Cohen, Jamel Debbouze, Serge Hefez, Françoise Héritier, Stéphane Hessel, Memona Hintermann-Afféjee, Agnès Jaoui, Axel Khan, Karl Lagerfeld, Hervé Le Bras, Henri Leclerc, Bernard-Henri Lévy, Daniel Lindenberg, Michèle Manceaux, Éric Naulleau, Pap Ndiaye, Serge Paugam, Patrick Pelloux, Serge Portelli, Jean-Michel Quillardet, Joël Roman, Jean-Christophe Rufin, Olivier Schmitt, Philippe Sollers, Martine Storti, Serge Tisseron, Annette Wieviorka, Michel Wieviorka;

== See also ==
- 2012 French presidential election
- Aubryists
