= List of senators of Oise =

Location of Oise in France

Following is a list of senators of Oise, people who have represented the department of Oise in the Senate of France.

== Third Republic ==
Senators for Oise under the French Third Republic were:

- Joseph-Hardouin-Gustave d'Andlau (1876–1881)
- Jean-Louis Aubrelicque (1876–1879)
- Franck Chauveau (1888–1906)
- Alphonse Chovet (1888–1905)
- Paul Cuvinot (1879–1920)
- Georges Decroze (1931–1939)
- Victor Delpierre (1920–1933)
- Émile Dupont (1906–1920)
- Célestin Lagache (1879–1888)
- Maurice Langlois-Meurinne (1924–1933)
- Raymond de Malherbe (1876–1879)
- Charles Noël (1906–1930)
- Léon Roland (1920–1924)
- Paul-Édouard Vasseux (1933–1941)
- Alexandre Goré (1933–1940)
- Alphonse Warusfel (1939–1941)

== Fourth Republic ==
Senators for Oise under the French Fourth Republic were:

- Jean-Marie Berthelot (1946–1948)
- Georges Jauneau (1946–1948)
- Robert Sené (1948–1957)
- Amédée Bouquerel (1948–1959)
- Marcel Dassault (1957–1959)

== Fifth Republic ==
Senators for Oise under the French Fifth Republic were:

From	Name	Notes
1959	Amédée Bouquerel	
1959	Hector Dubois	
1959	Pierre Patria	
1965	Amédée Bouquerel	
1965	Hector Dubois	
1965	Jean Natali	
1974	Amédée Bouquerel	
1974	Hector Dubois	
1974	Jean Natali	
1983	Amédée Bouquerel	
1983	Jean Natali	
1983	Michel Souplet	
1992	Philippe Marini	
1992	Alain Vasselle	
1992	Michel Souplet	
2001	Philippe Marini	
2001	André Vantomme	
2001	Alain Vasselle	
2011	Caroline Cayeux	
2011	Philippe Marini	Resigned 2015, replaced by Alain Vasselle
2011	Alain Vasselle	
2011	Yves Rome	
2011	Laurence Rossignol	In government from 2014 to 2017, replaced by Jean-Pierre Bosino
2011	Jean-Pierre Bosino	2014–2017
2017	Nadège Lefebvre	The Republicans group (LR)
2017	Édouard Courtial	The Republicans group (LR)
2017	Laurence Rossignol	Socialist and Republican group (PS)
2017	Olivier Paccaud	The Republicans group (LR)

== Sources ==
- Liste des anciens sénateurs de la IIIème République par circonscription (in French), Sénat de France
- Liste des anciens sénateurs de la IVème République par circonscription (in French), Sénat de France
- Liste des anciens sénateurs de la Vème République par circonscription (in French), Sénat de France
- Liste par département – Oise (in French), Sénat de France
