= Regional Council of Picardy =

Former regional legislature in France

- Flag of Regional Council of Picardy

Type
- Type: Unicameral

History
- Disbanded: 1 January 2016

Leadership
- President: Claude Gewerc, PS since 28 March 2004

Structure
- Seats: 57
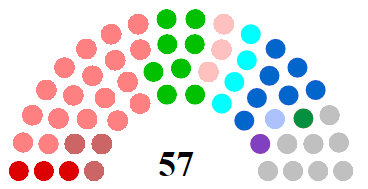
- Political groups: Socialist Party (18); Europe Ecology - The Greens (8); National Front (8); Union for a Popular Movement (7); Union of Democrats and Independents (4); Movement of Progressives (3); Initiative démocratique de gauche (3); Radical Party of the Left (3); Hunting, Fishing, Nature and Traditions (1); Miscellaneous Right (1); Movement for France (1)

The Regional Council of Picardy (French: Conseil régional de Picardie, Picard: Consièl régional ed Picardie) was the deliberative assembly of the former French region of Picardy, a decentralized territorial community. Its headquarters were in Amiens and it was headed last by Claude Gewerc (PS) between March 28, 2004, and December 31, 2015.

== Executive ==
The vice-presidents of the council from 2010 to 2015 were:

Order	Name	Party
1st	Nicolas Dumont	PS
2nd	Christophe Porquier	EELV
3rd	Beatrice Lejeune	PS
4th	Anne Ferreira	PS
5th	Daniel Beurdeley	PCF
6th	Philippe Massein	PS
7th	Laurence Rossignol	PS
8th	François Veillerette	EELV
9th	Didier Cardon	PS
10th	Sylvie Hubert	PRG
11th	Valérie Kumm	PS
12th	Alain Reuter	PS
13th	Marie-Christine Guillemin	EELV
14th	Olivier Chapuis-Roux	UMP
15th	Mireille Tiquet	PS

== List of presidents of the Regional Council ==
Successive presidents of the regional council
Period		Identity	Party
1974	1976	Jean Legendre	CNIP
1976	1978	Charles Baur	UDF
1978	1979	Max Lejeune	PSD
1979	1980	Jacques Mossion	DVD
1980	1981	Raymond Maillet	PCF
1981	1983	René Dosiere	PS
1983	1985	Walter Amsallem	PS
1985	2004	Charles Baur	UDF
2004	2015	Claude Gewerc	PS
