= Pensions Reserve Fund (France) =

French Reserve Fund
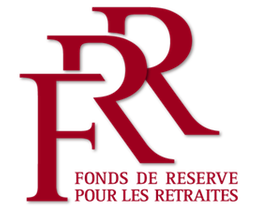
- Native name: Fonds de Réserve pour les Retraites (FRR)
- Company type: Public owned State-funded agency
- Industry: Investments
- Founded: 17 July 2001
- Headquarters: Paris, France
- Number of employees: 49
- Website: fondsdereserve.fr/en

The French Pension Reserve Fund (French: Fonds de Réserve pour les Retraites, FRR) is a public entity created by law n°2001-624 dated 17 July 2001. Its mission is to invest monies entrusted to it by the public authorities on behalf of the community with the aim of financing the French pension system. Its investment policy is to optimize returns on the investments it makes as prudently as possible. Its policy must be consistent with those collective values that are designed to promote balanced economic, social and environmental development.

== Assets under management ==
In 2009, FRR had €31.9 billion in assets under management. As of December 2016 the FRR's assets were 36 billion Euros. At the end of 2024 FRR's assets were estimated to be around €36 billion.

== History ==
At its creation the target was to build a reserve fund of 150 billion Euro by 2020. The funds were to come from 4 sources:

- Surpluses of certain social security funds (Fonds de solidarité vieillesse)
- Privatization resources
- Mobile phone licences
- Stock market transaction tax

After initially receiving funds from the FSV and 1.2 billion from the privatization of the Autoroute company (Autoroutes du sud de la France) since 2003 the fund has been funded mainly by 65% of the investment tax of 2%. The fund was set up to guarantee the financial stability of:

- The CNAV (Caisse Nationale d'Assurance Vieillesse or National Pension Insurance Bank),
- Organic (Caisse de retraite des commerçants et des chefs d’entreprises commerciales or Pensions Bank of the traders), and
- Cancava (Caisse de retraite des artisans or Pensions Bank of craftsmen).

First payments were set to start in 2020.

The fund had a return of 9.68% in 2023, with an average net return of 3.9% per year since 2011.

== Details on the FRR's role ==
The FRR is a long-run investor. Its mission as conferred by law is to “manage the sums that are allocated to it, to build up reserves to help ensure the long-term future of eligible retirement plans”. The Fund is also responsible for the financial management of a portion of the exceptional, one-off, lump-sum contribution owed to the CNAV (Caisse Nationale d'Assurance Vieillesse).

The government has set out a timetable for the payout of the Fund's assets. Under the terms of the social security financing law 2011,“the sums allocated to the Fund are held in reserve until 1st January 2011. As from this date and up until 2024, the Fund shall each year, and at the latest by 31 October, pay 2.1 billion euros to the national social debt amortization fund (Caisse d'Amortissement de la Dette Sociale - CADES) to help finance, between 2011 and 2018” the deficits of the entities that administer the basic pension.

On this basis the FRR determines the general investment policy guidelines consistent with"the principles of prudence and risk diversification given the target timetable for utilisation of the Fund's resources, in particular the above-mentioned payout obligations".In its implementation, the aim of the FRR's investment policy is also to help finance economic actors in general and businesses in particular. This in turn helps to consolidate their prospects for long-term growth and promote sustainable wealth creation and job growth. At the same time, it is consistent with certain shared values that promote balanced economic, social and environmental development. In 2008, the Supervisory Board adopted a responsible investment strategy which seeks to enable the Fund to honour its commitments as a signatory to the UN's PRI (Principles for Responsible Investment).

== Activity ==
The management of its assets is entrusted to authorized investment services providers permitted to conduct portfolio management services on behalf of third parties as referred to in paragraph 4 of article L.321-1 of the monetary and financial Code. As an administrative public establishment, the FRR is required to select its contractors using the French government procurement process (RFP procedures). The employees are mainly coming from the asset management industry, and are specialised in investment services providers selection.

== FRR's organisation ==
The FRR is a publicly owned, state-funded agency governed by

- an Executive Board and,
- a Supervisory Board.

Consistent with its stated purpose and in light of the volumes of funds it manages, the FRR has set up structures of management and government intended to ensure:

- Independence: This spirit is reflected in the Fund's status.
- Transparency: Due to the nature of the Fund's resources, its strategy and financial statements must be disclosed to the public at regular intervals. The process of awarding management mandates for the Fund's assets is conducted in compliance with official government regulations on public bidding and requests for proposals (RFPs).
- Close involvement of labor and management stakeholders and legislators in the operation of the FRR, via its Supervisory Board.

== The Supervisory Board of the FRR ==
Supervisory Board members include legislators, labor/management stakeholders, representatives of the ministries under whose general supervision the FRR operates (i.e., the ministries of Social Security and of the Economy, Finance and Industry) and individuals with recognized credentials in fields that are relevant to Fund's stated missions. The Board, which currently counts twenty members, is required to meet a minimum of twice yearly.

In November 24, 2011, Alain Vasselle became President of the Supervisory Board of the FRR. In 2020, Sandrine Lemery was appointed chair of the supervisory board.

== The Executive Board ==
The Executive Board has three members:

- Olivier Sichel – Interim President of the Executive Board of FRR
- Adrien Perret – member of the Executive board,
- Salwa Boussoukaya-Nasr – member of the Executive board.

The Executive Board is responsible for directing the agency and for ensuring its smooth operation. It executes investment policy guidelines and ensures compliance with them. The Executive Board reports regularly to the Supervisory Board on its management of the agency, and in particular relates information on the way in which investment policy guidelines take into account social, environmental and ethical considerations.

== Management Structure Chart ==
- Management Structure Chart

== See also ==
- Pensions in France
