= Xavier Bertrand =

French politician (born 1965)

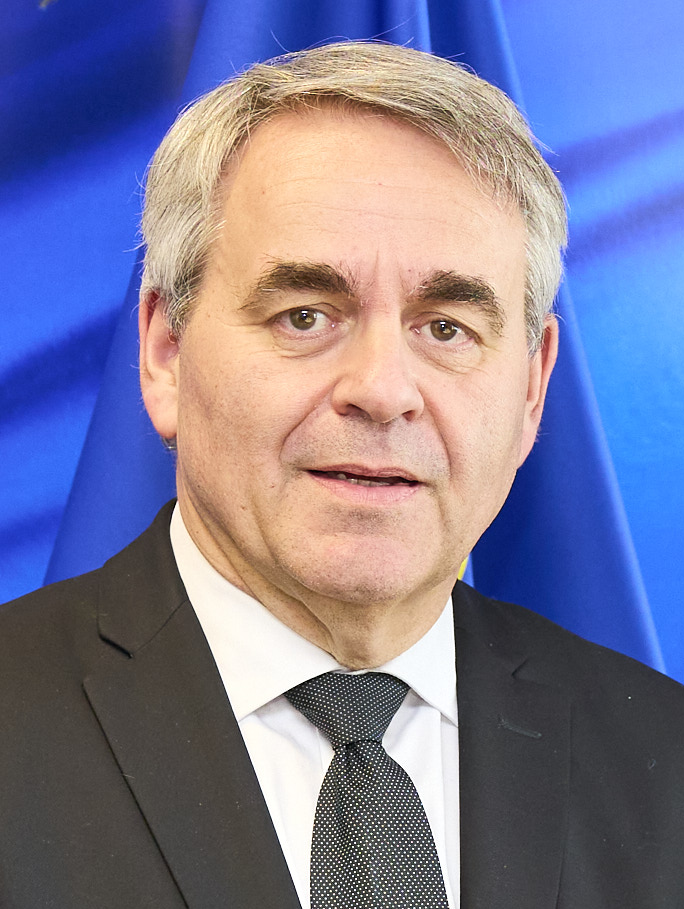
- Bertrand in 2025

President of the Regional Council of Hauts-de-France
- Incumbent
- Assumed office 4 January 2016
- Preceded by: Claude Gewerc (Picardy); Daniel Percheron (Nord-Pas-de-Calais)

Mayor of Saint-Quentin
- In office 4 October 2010 – 14 January 2016
- Preceded by: Pierre André
- Succeeded by: Frédérique Macarez

Minister of Labour, Employment and Health
- In office 14 November 2010 – 10 May 2012
- President: Nicolas Sarkozy
- Prime Minister: François Fillon
- Preceded by: Éric Woerth (Labour, Solidarity and Civil Service); Christine Lagarde (Economy, Industry and Employment); Roselyne Bachelot (Health and Sports)
- Succeeded by: Michel Sapin (Labour, Employment and Social Dialogue); Marisol Touraine (Social Affairs and Health)

Secretary-General of the Union for a Popular Movement
- In office 5 December 2008 – 17 November 2010
- Preceded by: Patrick Devedjian
- Succeeded by: Jean-François Copé

Minister of Labour, Social Relations and Solidarity
- In office 18 May 2007 – 15 January 2009
- President: Nicolas Sarkozy
- Prime Minister: François Fillon
- Preceded by: Jean-Louis Borloo (Labour, Social Cohesion and Housing)
- Succeeded by: Brice Hortefeux (Labor, Social Relations, Family, Solidarity and the City)

Minister of Health and Solidarity
- In office 2 June 2005 – 26 March 2007
- President: Jacques Chirac
- Prime Minister: Dominique de Villepin
- Preceded by: Philippe Douste-Blazy (Health and Sports)
- Succeeded by: Philippe Bas (Solidarity, Health and the Family); Roselyne Bachelot (Health, Solidarity, Social Security, the Elderly, Handicapped Persons and the Family)

Member of the National Assembly for the Aisne's 2nd constituency
- In office 19 June 2002 – 12 January 2016
- Preceded by: Odette Grzegrzulka
- Succeeded by: Julien Dive

Departmental Councillor of Aisne
- In office 27 March 1998 – 19 June 2002
- President: Jean-Pierre Balligand; Yves Daudigny

Personal details
- Born: Xavier René Louis Bertrand; 21 March 1965 (age 61) Châlons-sur-Marne, France
- Party: LR (2015–2017; since 2021)
- Other political affiliations: RPR (1981–2002); UMP (2002–2015)
- Spouse(s): Isabelle Dubois (divorced) Emmanuelle Gontier (m. 1998; div. 2014) Vanessa Williot (m. 2018)
- Children: 5
- Education: University of Reims Champagne-Ardenne

Xavier René Louis Bertrand (French pronunciation: [ɡzavje bɛʁˈtʁɑ̃]; born 21 March 1965) is a French politician; he is president of the regional council of Hauts-de-France since the 2015 regional elections.

Earlier in his career, Bertrand was Minister of Health from 2005 to 2007 in Dominique de Villepin's government under President Jacques Chirac, then served as Minister of Labour, Social Affairs and Solidarity from 2007 to 2009 and as Minister of Labour, Employment and Health from 2010 to 2012. He played a leading role in Nicolas Sarkozy's presidential campaign in 2007. He was a member of the Union for a Popular Movement, later the Republicans, until 11 December 2017, when he announced that was "definitively leaving" the party after Laurent Wauquiez was elected the leader of the party.

== Early life and education ==
Bertrand was born on 21 March 1965 in Châlons-sur-Marne, in the Marne département, of the Champagne-Ardenne région of France. He studied at the University of Reims Champagne-Ardenne, where he obtained a master's degree in public law, then a Diplôme d'Études Supérieures Spécialisées (DESS) in local administration.

Bertrand began his professional life as an insurance agent.

== Political career ==
=== Early beginnings ===
At the age of sixteen, Bertrand volunteered for the Rally for the Republic (RPR) and quickly went into politics.

In 1992, Bertrand led the campaign for the 'no' to the Maastricht Treaty in his department, the Aisne in the region of Picardy. He was at the time assistant to the mayor of Saint-Quentin, Aisne. He was one of the pioneers of the 'Saint-Quentin beach', an event similar to Paris-Plage. From 1997 to 2002, he was parliamentary assistant to Jacques Braconnier, Senator for the Aisne, and he was elected to the National Assembly on 16 June 2002 for the 18th legislature (2002–2007), representing the second constituency of the Aisne Department.

In 2003, Alain Juppé, President for the Union for a Popular Movement (UMP), put him in charge of leading the debate and explaining the subject of pensions reform during a "Tour of France". He was chosen to defend this draft bill in the National Assembly. At the same time he was part of the 'Club de la boussole,' a group of deputies who declared their loyalty to then-President Jacques Chirac and Prime Minister Jean-Pierre Raffarin.

=== Career in government ===
During this period, Bertrand received favourable attention in the right-wing political milieu. On 31 March 2004, when Raffarin appointed his third government, Bertrand was named Junior Health Minister for Health Insurance. Under his Senior Minister, Philippe Douste-Blazy, he led the reform on health insurance. Later on, he pronounced himself strongly in favour of a European Constitution for the referendum on 29 May 2005.

After the majority of the French electorate answered "no" to the referendum, Raffarin resigned as Prime Minister. Under his successor Dominique de Villepin, Bertrand became the Senior Minister for Health, when Douste-Blazy was reappointed Foreign Affairs Minister. His mandate as Health Minister was marked by the chikungunya epidemic and the law against smoking in public places, ratified in 2004.

Bertrand announced his support to UMP presidential candidate Nicolas Sarkozy on 29 September 2006. He was named Sarkozy's official spokesperson on 15 January 2007. He quit the government on 26 March to devote himself fully to the campaign. On 18 May 2007, he was named Minister of Labour, Social Affairs and Solidarity in the Prime Minister François Fillon's government.

On 19 June 2007 Bertrand was appointed Minister of Labour, Social Affairs and Solidarity in Fillon's second government after the first one had handed in its resignation the day before. He later served as Minister of Labour, Employment and Health from 2010 to 2012.

=== Later career ===
Following the 2012 French legislative election, Bertrand announced his candidacy for the post the UMP parliamentary group's chair. Having been endorsed by François Fillon, he lost an internal vote against Christian Jacob.

In the 2015 regional elections, Bertrand won over Marine Le Pen and became the president of the Regional Council of Hauts-de-France.

Amid the Fillon affair, in March 2017, Bertrand joined Valérie Pécresse, Christian Estrosi and others in calling for Alain Juppé to replace François Fillon as the party's candidate in the 2017 French presidential election.

In 2020, Bertrand publicly expressed interest in challenging incumbent President Emmanuel Macron in the 2022 French presidential election. By early 2021, Betrand was widely tipped by French and international media to be the center-right's candidate. According to 2021 polls, he would be in 3rd position behind Emmanuel Macron and Marine Le Pen. At the party's 2021 congress, however, he only came in fourth after Éric Ciotti, Valérie Pécresse and Michel Barnier; he subsequently endorsed Pécresse.

In the 2021 regional elections, Bertrand was re-elected. He obtained 52.37 percent of the vote in the Hauts-de-France region, against 25.65 percent for Sébastien Chenu of the National Rally.

In late 2021, Bertrand launched Nous France, a conservative movement. Ahead of the Republicans' 2022 convention, he endorsed Bruno Retailleau as the party's chairman. He renewed his endorsement of Retailleau in the Republicans' 2025 leadership election.

In August 2026, Bertrand announced his candidacy for the 2027 French presidential election.

== Political positions ==
=== Domestic policy ===
Bertrand is considered representative of France's moderate right. He was the best-placed traditional conservative in opinion polls for the 2021 Republican congress, but ended up in fourth place.

In 2013, Bertrand led a group of fellow UMP politicians who joined forces with Europe Ecology – The Greens in trying to force a constitutional review of a new law introduced by the Socialist Party which expanded government powers to monitor phone and Internet connection data. However, in a blow to the campaign, UMP parliamentary group leader Christian Jacob later wrote to his colleagues that the group would not seek a legal review.

In 2014, Bertrand advocated a "rewrite" or "repeal" of the law opening marriage to same-sex couples, indicating to Valeurs actuelles: "I can't resign myself to seeing the rules of filiation turned upside down to this extent. I am against adoption by homosexual couples, PMA assisted reproductive technology and of course GPA surrogacy." He reiterated his opposition to same-sex marriage in 2017.

Ahead of the 2022 elections, Bertrand defended liberal economic positions. According to Marianne magazine, he intends to position himself on the right of Emmanuel Macron. In particular, he wants to cut production taxes by half, believing that the measures undertaken in this direction by the government are insufficient. This project, which would represent a loss of 33 billion euros for the state, would be compensated "in particular by efforts on public spending"; it provides for a postponement of two years of the retirement age and a reform of the unemployment insurance system that would result in a tightening of the conditions of compensation for the unemployed. Has also promised the "re-industrialisation" of France and quotas on immigration. He has also run on an anti-technocratic message.

=== Foreign policy ===
In July 2014, Bertrand defended President François Hollande's decision to push ahead with delivery of a Mistral-class amphibious assault ship to Russia in defiance of calls by key allies, despite the Russo-Ukrainian War; the deal was later called off.

During his presidential campaign in 2021, Bertrand argued that France should reassert itself by leaving NATO’s integrated command.

== Personal life ==
Bertrand married Emmanuelle Gontier, advisor on human resources, on 11 July 1998. They have three children, two of whom are twins. He has been a member of the Grand Orient of France since 1995.

Political offices
Preceded by Philippe Douste-Blazy as Minister of Health and Sports	Minister of Health and Solidarity; 2005–2007	Succeeded by Roselyne Bachelot as Minister of Solidarity, Health and the Family
Preceded by Philippe Douste-Blazy as Minister of Health and Sports	Minister of Health and Solidarity; 2005–2007	Succeeded by Philippe Bas as Minister of Health, Solidarity, Social Security, the Elderly, Handicapped Persons and the Family
Preceded by Jean-Louis Borloo as Minister of Labour, Social Cohesion and Housing	Minister of Labour, Social Relations and Solidarity; 2007–2009	Succeeded by Brice Hortefeux as Minister of Labor, Social Relations, Family, Solidarity and the City
Preceded by Éric Woerth as Minister of Labour, Solidarity and Civil Service	Minister of Labour, Employment and Health; 2010–2012	Succeeded by Michel Sapin as Minister of Labour, Employment and Social Dialogue; Marisol Touraine as Minister of Social Affairs and Health
Preceded by Christine Lagarde as Minister of Economy, Industry and Employment	Minister of Labour, Employment and Health; 2010–2012	Succeeded by Michel Sapin as Minister of Labour, Employment and Social Dialogue; Marisol Touraine as Minister of Social Affairs and Health
Preceded by Roselyne Bachelot as Minister of Health and Sports	Minister of Labour, Employment and Health; 2010–2012	Succeeded by Michel Sapin as Minister of Labour, Employment and Social Dialogue; Marisol Touraine as Minister of Social Affairs and Health
Preceded by Pierre André	Mayor of Saint-Quentin; 2010–2016	Succeeded by Frédérique Macarez
Preceded by Claude Gewerc as President of the Regional Council of Picardy	President of the Regional Council of Hauts-de-France; 2016–present	Incumbent
Preceded by Daniel Percheron as President of the Regional Council of Nord-Pas-de-Calais	President of the Regional Council of Hauts-de-France; 2016–present	Incumbent
Party political offices
Preceded by Patrick Devedjian	Secretary-General of the Union for a Popular Movement; 2008–2010	Succeeded by Jean-François Copé
