= 2004 Picardy regional election =

| ← 1998 | 21 March 2004 (first round); 28 March 2004 (second round) | 2010 → |
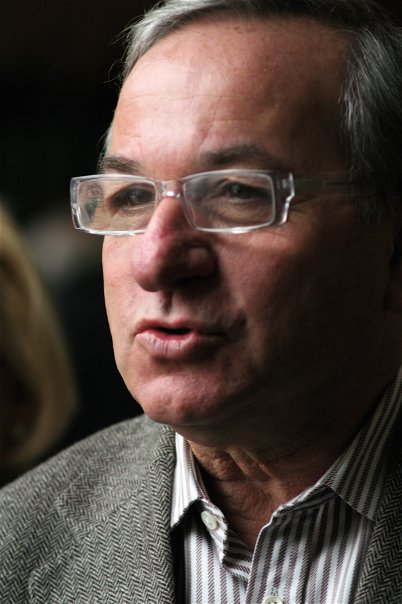

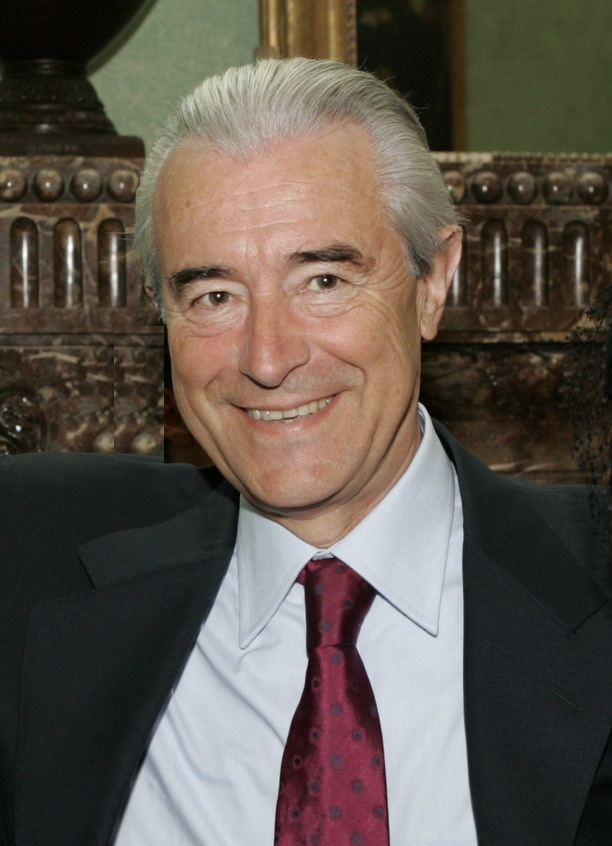
| | First party | Second party | Third party |
|---|---|---|---|
| Leader | Claude Gewerc | Gilles de Robien | Michel Guiniot |
| Party | PS | UDF | FN |
| Seats won | 34 | 15 | 8 |
| Popular vote | 380,600 | 298,581 | 155,859 |
| Percentage | 45.58% | 35.76% | 18.66% |

A regional election took place in Picardy on March 21 and March 28, 2004, along with all other regions. Claude Gewerc (PS) was elected President of the former Council of Picardy (now merged to Regional Council of Hauts-de-France), defeating incumbent Gilles de Robien.

== Results ==
| Party | Presidential candidate | First round | | Second round | | Seats |
| Party | Presidential candidate | Votes | % | Votes | % | Seats |
|---|---|---|---|---|---|---|
| Socialist Party | Claude Gewerc | 210,338 | 27.42 | 380,600 | 45.58 | 34 |
| Union for French Democracy | Gilles de Robien | 247,425 | 32.26 | 298,581 | 35.76 | 15 |
| National Front | Michel Guiniot | 175,940 | 22.94 | 155,859 | 18.66 | 8 |
| French Communist Party | Maxime Gremetz | 83,282 | 10.86 | | | 0 |
| LCR–LO | Roland Szpirko | 49,995 | 6.52 | | | 0 |
| Total | | 766,980 | 100.00 | 835,040 | 100.00 | 57 |
| Valid votes | | 766,980 | 94.73 | 835,040 | 96.56 | |
| Invalid/blank votes | | 42,682 | 5.27 | 29,707 | 3.44 | |
| Total votes | | 809,662 | 100.00 | 864,747 | 100.00 | |
| Registered voters/turnout | | 1,279,094 | 63.30 | 1,279,000 | 67.61 | |
Source: Ministry of the Interior, Delwit
