= Lille railway station =

Lille railway station or Lille station may refer to:

- Lille-Europe station (French: Gare de Lille-Europe), the international and TGV station in Lille, France
- Lille-Flandres station (French: Gare de Lille-Flandres), the main railway station in Lille, France
- Lille-Saint-Sauveur station (French: Gare de Lille-Saint-Sauveur), a former goods station that has been converted into an event and exhibition space
