= Laurence Rossignol =

French politician

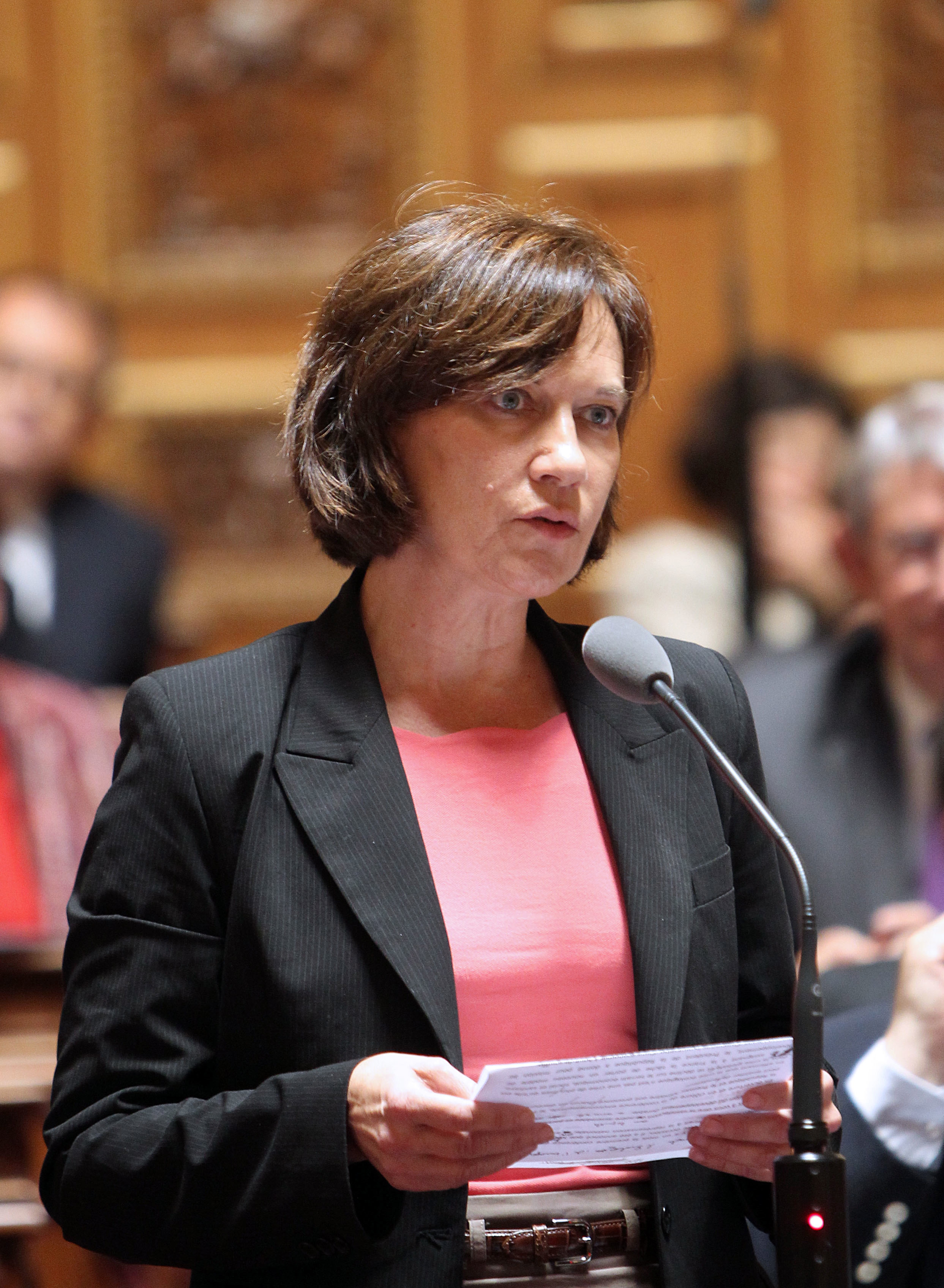
- Rossignol in 2012

Vice-President of the French Senate
- In office 6 October 2020 – 1 October 2023
- President: Gérard Larcher
- Preceded by: David Assouline
- Succeeded by: Sylvie Robert

Member of the French Senate
- Incumbent
- Assumed office 18 June 2017
- Preceded by: Jean-Pierre Bosino
- Parliamentary group: SOC
- Constituency: Oise (2017-2023); Val-de-Marne (since 2023)
- In office 1 October 2011 – 9 May 2014
- Preceded by: André Vantomme
- Succeeded by: Jean-Pierre Bosino
- Parliamentary group: SOC
- Constituency: Oise

Minister for Families, Children and Women's Rights
- In office 11 February 2016 – 10 May 2017
- President: François Hollande
- Prime Minister: Manuel Valls; Bernard Cazeneuve
- Preceded by: Pascale Boistard (Women's rights Marie-Josée Roig (indirectly Children)
- Succeeded by: Marlène Schiappa (Women's rights)

Secretary of State for Family, the Elderly, Autonomy and Children
- In office 9 April 2014 – 11 February 2016
- President: François Hollande
- Prime Minister: Manuel Valls
- Preceded by: Dominique Bertinotti
- Succeeded by: Pascale Boistard

Vice-president of the Regional Council of Picardie
- In office 2 April 2004 – 9 May 2014
- President: Claude Gewerc
- Succeeded by: Sylvie Houssin

Member of Regional Council of Picardie
- In office 21 March 1998 – 31 December 2015

Personal details
- Born: 22 December 1957 (age 68) La Garenne-Colombes, France
- Party: Socialist Party
- Education: University of Burgundy; Paris 1 Panthéon-Sorbonne University

Laurence Rossignol (French pronunciation: [lɔʁɑ̃s ʁɔsiɲɔl]; born 22 December 1957) is a French politician of the Socialist Party (PS) who has served as a member of the French Senate from 2011 to 2014 and again since 2017, representing Oise. From 2014 to 2017, she served as Secretary of State for the Family, Senior Citizens and Autonomy in the governments of Prime Ministers Manuel Valls and Bernard Cazeneuve.

== Political career ==
Ahead of the Socialist Party's 2008 convention in Reims, Rossignol publicly endorsed Martine Aubry as candidate to succeed François Hollande at the party's leadership. When Aubry took over as party leader, she became the Socialist Party's spokesperson for environmental policy. In the party's 2011 primaries, she supported Aubry as its candidate for the 2012 presidential election.

From 2014 to 2017, Rossignol served as State Secretary under the leadership of Minister of Health Marisol Touraine. During her time in office, she established the Agency for the Recovery of Unpaid Alimonies (ARIPA) to ensure the recovery of outstanding child support.

=== Member of the Senate, 2017–present ===
In the Socialist Party's presidential primaries, Rossignol endorsed Manuel Valls as the party's candidate for the 2017 French presidential election. At the Aubervilliers Congress in 2017, she also supported Luc Carvounas’ candidacy to lead the PS.

In 2017, Rossignol was a candidate for the leadership of the Socialist group in the Senate, against Martial Bourquin and incumbent Didier Guillaume; Guillaume was eventually re-elected. When Guillaume eventually retired in 2008, Rossignol lost out against Patrick Kanner in an internal vote, with 47 against 25 votes.

Ahead of the 2022 presidential election, Rossignol endorsed Arnaud Montebourg as the party’s candidate to replace incumbent President Emmanuel Macron.

== Political positions ==
In 2015, Rossignol defended the government's policy of testing the bones of foreign minors to determine their age.

In 2016, Rossignol caused controversy when she compared Islamic women who chose to wear veils to "negroes who were for slavery". She was later reported to have apologized for the use of the word negro but stood by her comparison of veil wearing to slavery.
