= Odette Grzegrzulka =

French politician (1947–2019)

Deputy for Aisne's 2nd constituency
- In office 12 June 1997 – 18 June 2002
- Preceded by: Charles Baur
- Succeeded by: Xavier Bertrand

Personal details
- Born: 1 March 1947 Paris, France
- Died: 30 November 2019 (aged 72) Paris, France

Odette Grzegrzulka (1 March 1947 – 30 November 2019) was a French politician who served as deputy, representing Aisne's 2nd constituency.

== Biography ==
Grzegrzulka earned a bachelor's degree in philosophy and a master's degree in Polish. She joined the Socialist Party in 1979. She worked with Jack Lang at the Ministry of Culture from 1981 to 1986 and again from 1988 to 1993. She was in charge of relations with parliamentarians.

She was at Blois in 1989, where she was an assistant of social affairs and solidarity. Afterwards, she joined Daniel Vaillant in the 18th arrondissement of Paris.

During the 1997 French legislative election, she ran for Aisne's 2nd constituency. She came first in the first round with 28.63% of the vote, ahead of outgoing deputy and chairman of the regional council Charles Baur at 27.84%. She was elected in the second round with 56.52% of the vote. She joined the Socialist Party in the National Assembly, and in January 1999 she published a report to Prime Minister Jacques Chirac, titled Propositions pour un renforcement de la sécurité sanitaire environnementale (Proposals for a Strengthening of Environmental Health Security).

In the 1998 French cantonal elections, Grzegrzulka ran in the Canton of Saint-Quentin-Nord after Jacques Braconnier announced his retirement. She was beaten by deputy mayor of Saint-Quentin, Xavier Bertrand, who received 53% of the vote.

In the 2002 French legislative election, Grzegrzulka ran against Bertrand in the second round after Bertram received 43.13% and she received 26.91% of the votes. She would lose the second round as well, allocating 43.04% of the votes, while Bertrand received 56.96%. Her term in Parliament ended on 18 June 2002.

Grzegrzulka ran again in the 2007 French legislative election, but lost to Bertrand after only one round of votes. Bertrand received 53.28% of the vote, while Grzegrzulka received 22.81%. She returned to the Ministry of Culture after her defeat, and was then assigned to the Embassy of France in Moldova in 2009.

Odette Grzegrzulka died on 30 November 2019.
