= Julien Dive =

French politician (1985)

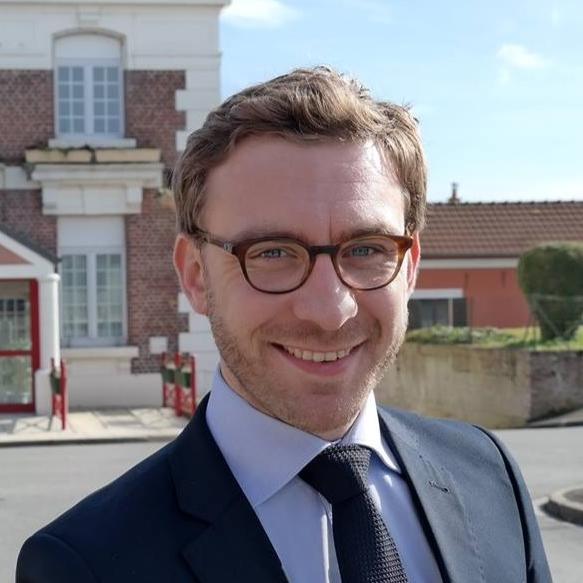

Member of the National Assembly for Aisne's 2nd constituency
- Incumbent
- Assumed office 21 March 2016
- Preceded by: Xavier Bertrand

Mayor of Itancourt
- In office 30 March 2014 – 17 July 2017
- Preceded by: Maurice Coutte
- Succeeded by: Régis Nollet

Personal details
- Born: 21 May 1985 (age 39); Saint-Quentin, France
- Political party: UMP (until 2015); The Republicans (since 2015)
- Education: University of Valenciennes and Hainaut-Cambresis
- Profession: Project manager

Julien Dive (born 21 May 1985) is a French politician who has been serving as the member of the National Assembly for the second constituency of Aisne since 2016. A member of The Republicans, he was elected to the municipal council of Itancourt in 2008 and became Mayor of Itancourt in 2014.

== Early life and education ==
After studying at the college "Suzanne Deustch" of Moÿ-de-l'Aisne, then "Josquin-Dès-Près" of Beaurevoir, Dive entered the school "Saint-Jean" in Saint-Quentin. After obtaining the Baccalauréat, he entered the Prytanée National Militaire of La Flèche in 2003 to prepare the competition of ESM Saint-Cyr to become an officer in the French Army. Finally, he obtained a degree in economics at the University of Valenciennes and Hainaut-Cambresis and a master's degree in entrepreneurship and management of SMEs at the IAE Valenciennes in 2008.

At the same time, following the economic dismissal of his commercial father, Dive created with him a SARL in 2013 specialized in the sale of tools and maintenance of agricultural equipment for farmers in Aisne. Born into a family of itinerant traders in the Saint-Quentin market in fruit and vegetables and whose grandfather had worked for 50 years, Julien Dive was always attached to the defense of local businesses.

== Political career ==
=== Early beginnings ===
Dive's entry into politics began in 2003, when at the age of 18 he joined the UMP and began as an activist in the youth section, which he became the departmental head in 2009. Only elected from the opposition list in the 2008 French municipal elections in his family village of Itancourt, he became mayor in 2014 French municipal elections. Touched by the limitation of the plurality of the mandates, he resigns from her position of Mayor of Itancourt on 17 July 2017.

In 2015 French departmental elections, Dive was in pairs with Orane Gobert to become county councilor of the Canton of Ribemont. He came third in the first round of the election with 25.59% and decided to stay in the second round in a triangular against the binomial FN, who came first in the first round, and the pair PS. He finished third with 22.82%.

=== Member of the National Assembly, 2016–present ===
Following the 2015 French regional elections, the deputy for the 2nd constituency of Aisne, Xavier Bertrand resigned, to devote himself to the presidency of the Hauts-de-France. Dive became the candidate of the Republicans for the by-election on 13 and 20 March 2016. On 20 March, he won the election in the second round against the candidate FN, Sylvie Saillard-Meunier.

On 18 June 2017, Dive was re-elected against the candidate FN Sylvie Saillard-Meunier. During a 15th legislature of the French Fifth Republic, he sits on the Economic Affairs Committee. He is Vice-president of the France-Netherlands Friendship Group and Vice-president oh the France-Kosovo Friendship Group.

Dive endorsed Christian Jacob as the party’s chairman in the run-up to the Republicans’ 2019 convention, and later supported Aurélien Pradié’s candidacy to succeed Jacob in 2021; instead, Éric Ciotti won the vote. In 2023, Ciotti appointed Dive as member of his shadow cabinet and put him in charge of agricultural policy.

== See also ==
- 2017 French legislative election
- 2024 French legislative election
