= Christine Revault d'Allonnes-Bonnefoy =

French socialist politician

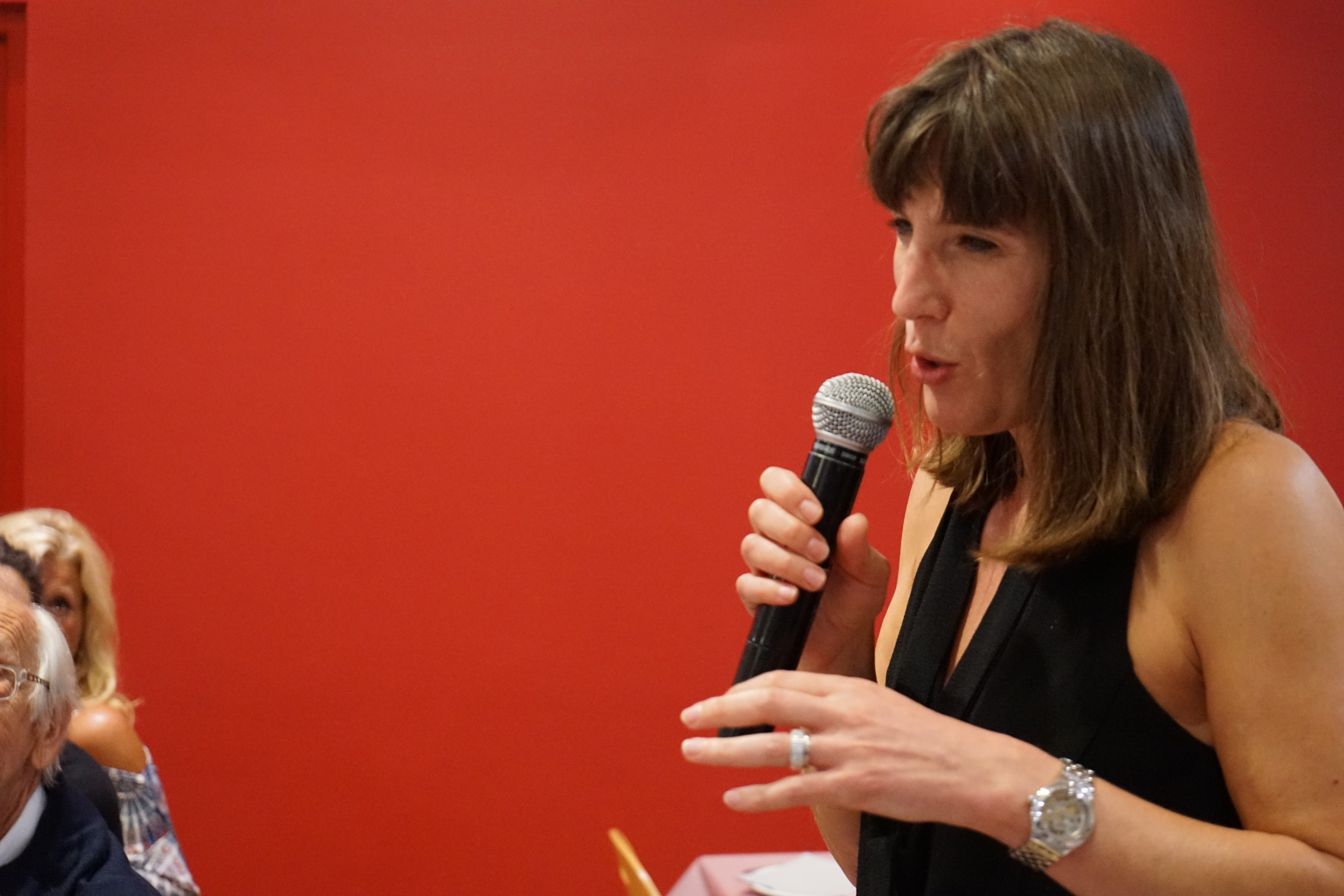

Member of the European Parliament
- In office 9 April 2014 – 1 July 2019
- Preceded by: Harlem Désir
- Constituency: Île-de-France

Councillor of Île-de-France
- In office 2 April 2004 – 18 December 2015
- President: Jean-Paul Huchon

Personal details
- Born: Christine Revault d'Allonnes; November 10, 1971 (age 54) Châteauroux, France
- Party: Socialist Party of France

Christine Revault d'Allonnes-Bonnefoy (born 10 November 1971 in Châteauroux) is a French female politician. As a member of the Socialist Party of France, she served as a councillor of the Regional Council of Île-de-France between 2004 and 2015, Member of the European Parliament (MEP) between 2014 and 2019, and member of the Socialist delegacy of the European Parliament between 2017 and 2019.

== Career ==
Christine Revault d'Allonnes joined the Socialist Party of France (PS) in 1995, joining Lionel Jospin's press office during the 1995 French presidential election.

In 2004 and 2010, she was elected to serve as Councillor of the Regional Council of Île-de-France. Prior to this, between 2002 and 2007, she served as deputy for National Assembly representative Jean-Yves Le Bouillonnec.

=== European Parliament (2014 - 2019) ===
In June 2009, she was 6th place on PS's list for the Île-de-France region in the European Parliament. In 2014, following a series of resignations from PS's list, she subsequently became an MEP.

In 2014, she ran for re-election in the European Parliament election in France, and was re-elected on 25 May 2014.
