= Arnaud Deslandes =

French politician (born 1982)

Mayor of Lille
- Incumbent
- Assumed office 21 March 2025
- Preceded by: Martine Aubry

Personal details
- Born: 22 October 1982 (age 43)
- Party: Socialist Party

Arnaud Deslandes (born 22 October 1982) is a French politician serving as mayor of Lille since 2025. From 2023 to 2025, he served as first deputy mayor. From 2013 to 2020, he served as chief of staff to Martine Aubry.
