= Simon Sutour =

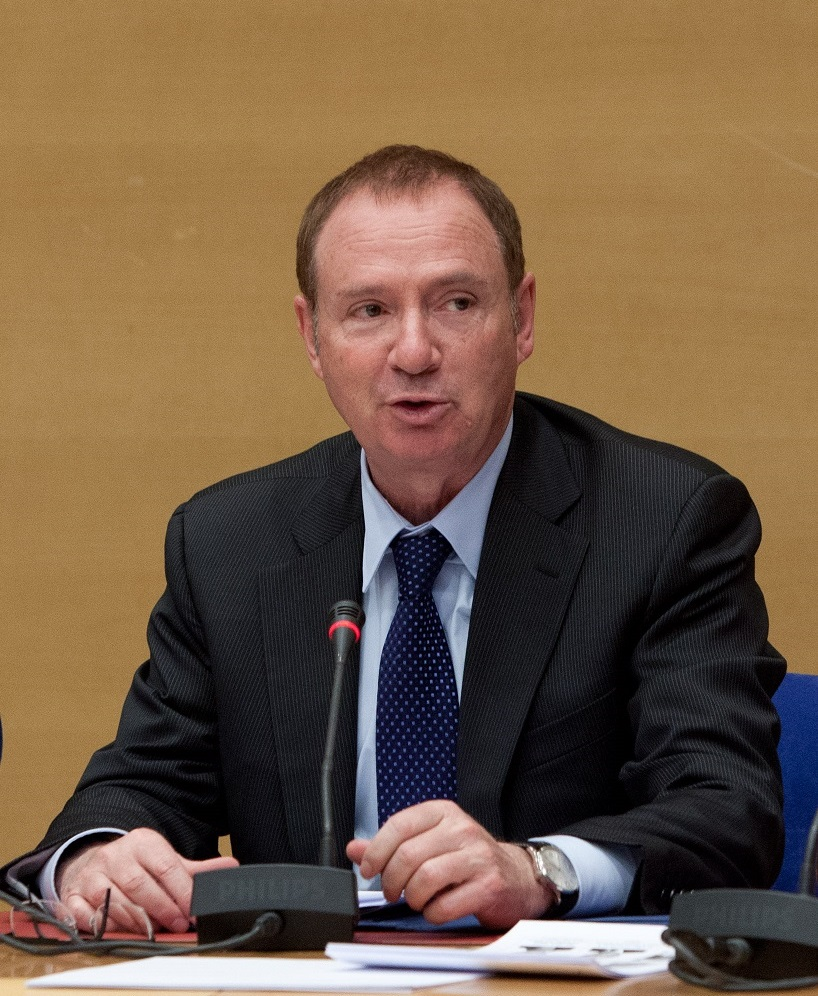
- Simon sutour giving a speech

Senator of Gard
- In office September 1998 – September 2008
- Incumbent
- Assumed office September 2008
- Preceded by: Himself

Personal details
- Born: 18 August 1952 (age 74) Sète, France
- Citizenship: French
- Party: Socialists
- Education: National Institute of Territorial Studies (INET)

Simon Sutour (born 18 August 1952) is a member of the Senate of France, representing the Gard department. He is a member of the Socialist Party. He was voted one of the best 50 personalities to come from Nîmes

== Career and Roles ==
Sutour was successively:

Assistant Chief of Services for General of the Council of Gard (- 1985 )

Director of Services (DGS) of the General Council of Gard ( 1985 - 1993 )

Chief of council services in Avignon ( located in Vaucluse ) ( 1993 - 1995 )

Assistant Director of Services of the municipality of Nîmes ( in 1995 - 1998 )

== Career in the Senate ==
He was successively:

Secretary of the Senate

Member of the Delegation for the European Union

Member of the advisory board of audiovisual archives of justice

Member of the National Review Board of State policies overseas

Member of the Board of Directors of the Conservatory of coastal areas and lake shores

Senator for Gard (permanently located in Nîmes) (since September 1998 )

== Within the Socialist Party ==
During the 2007 presidential campaign, Simon Sutour was a member of the support committee in the Gard Ségolène Royal for which he campaigned for. In the 2012 presidential election, he campaigned for Martine Aubry to represent the Socialist party. However François Hollande won the election for who would represent what party and thus was supported by the party. François Hollande then went on to win the presidential election. In the second round of voting on 6 May 2012, François Hollande was elected President of the French Republic with 51.7% of the vote.

== Roles in the Senate ==
Sutour chairs the Committee for European Affairs in the Senat. He is also a member of the Committee on Constitutional laws, legislation, universal suffrage, Regulations and general administration Sutour was also appointed Rapporteur on the free trade agreement between the European Union and the United States He has been particularly active on European integration issues, serving for several years as Chair of the Senate Committee for European Affairs.

== Lectures ==
He recently lectured at a Socialist party conference on employment, education, purchasing power, research, as well as ecology and Europe. He concluded the second session with the speech "a new direction for Europe".

== Honours and decorations ==
- Knight of the National Order of the Legion of Honour ( 1998 )
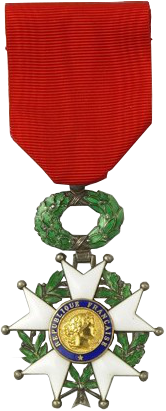
