= Harlem Désir =

French politician (born 1959)

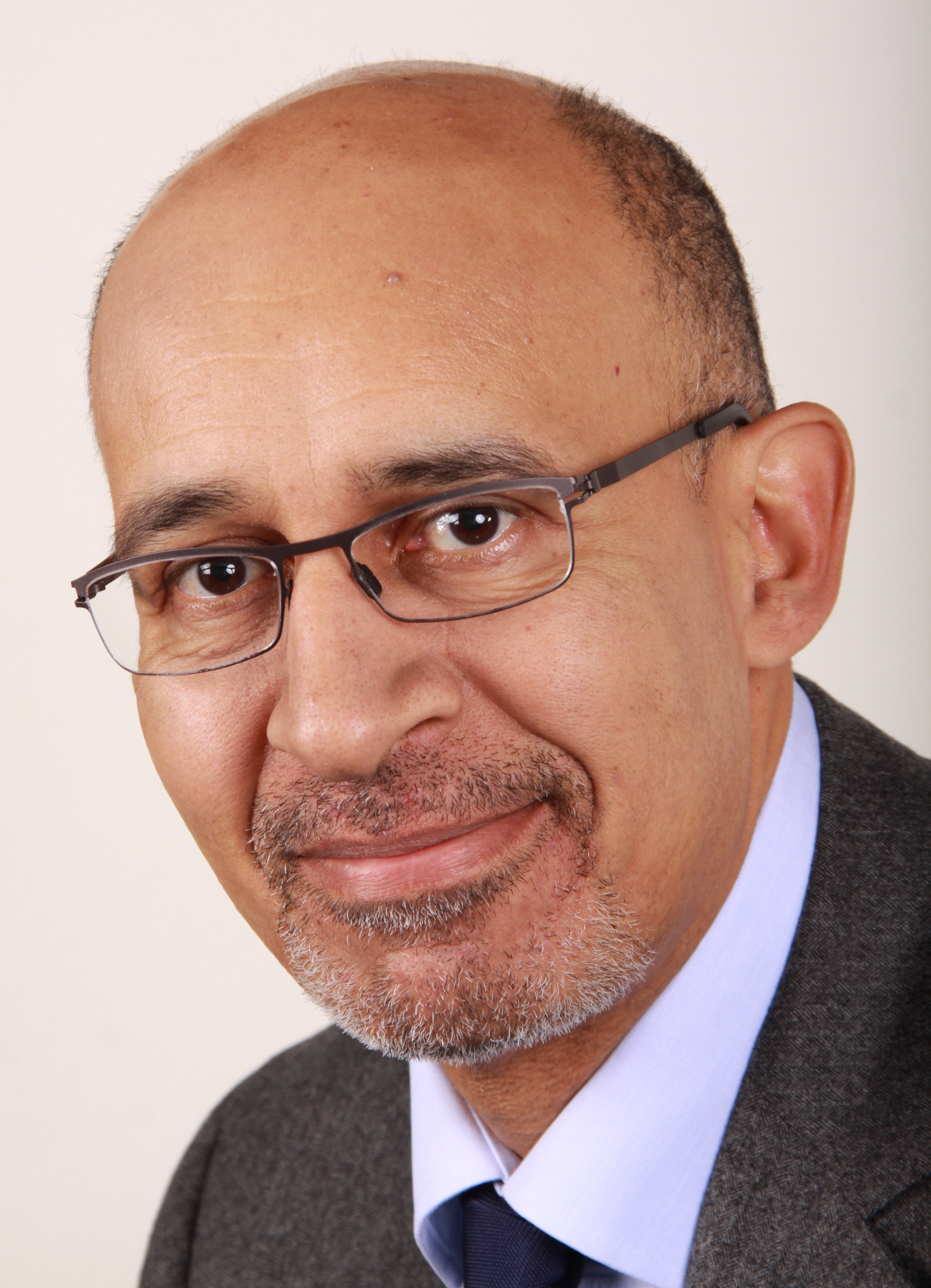

Secretary of State for European Affairs
- In office 9 April 2014 – 10 May 2017
- Prime Minister: Manuel Valls; Bernard Cazeneuve
- Preceded by: Thierry Repentin
- Succeeded by: Marielle de Sarnez

11th First Secretary of the Socialist Party
- In office 18 October 2012 – 9 April 2014 (acting: 16 September 2012 – 18 October 2012)
- Preceded by: Martine Aubry
- Succeeded by: Jean-Christophe Cambadélis
- In office 30 June 2011 – 16 October 2011 (acting)
- Preceded by: Martine Aubry
- Succeeded by: Martine Aubry

Member of the European Parliament
- In office 20 July 1999 – 8 April 2014
- Succeeded by: Christine Revault d'Allonnes-Bonnefoy
- Constituency: France

Personal details
- Born: 25 November 1959 (age 66) Paris, France
- Party: French: Socialist Party; EU: Party of European Socialists
- Education: University of Paris 1 Pantheon-Sorbonne

Harlem Jean-Philippe Désir (French: [aʁlɛm deziʁ]; born 25 November 1959) is a French politician who served as leader of the Socialist Party (PS) from 2012 to 2014.

First widely known as a community activist and as the first president of SOS Racisme in the 1980s, Désir subsequently entered politics in the 1990s, first in Génération Écologie then in the PS. He served as MEP from 1999 to 2014 and then served in the government of France as Secretary of State for European Affairs from 2014 to 2017. From 2017 to 2020, he served as the Organization for Security and Co-operation in Europe (OSCE) Representative on Freedom of the Media.

== Early life and education ==
Born in Paris, Désir is the son of a Martinican father and an Alsatian mother. He grew up in a housing project in Bagneux, north of Paris.

Désir studied at the Pantheon-Sorbonne University, where he earned a license in philosophy in 1983. Also in 1983, he emerged as a leader from that year's social unrest in France and helped organize the March for Equality and Against Racism (the so-called March of the Beurs) that started in the immigrant neighborhoods outside Lyon and ended in Paris.

== SOS Racism ==
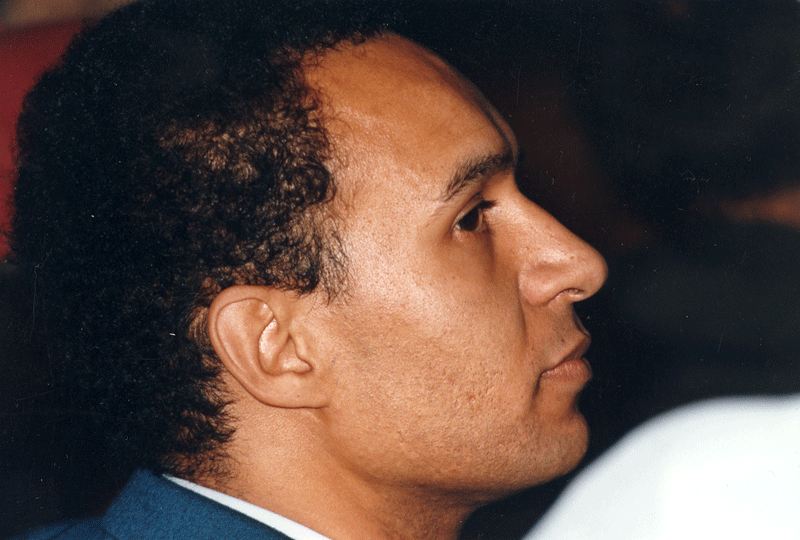
Harlem Desir in 1991

Harlem Désir was briefly active in the JCR, the youth organization of the Revolutionary Communist League. Désir was the first president of the French anti-racist organisation SOS Racisme between 1984 and 1992. Under his leadership, the organization grew significantly in membership and acquired significant influence in French public life. Accused of misusing public assets from 1986 to 1987, he was sentenced to an 18 months suspended sentence and a 30,000 francs fine in 1998.

== Political career ==
=== Member of the European Parliament, 1999–2014 ===
Désir first became a Member of the European Parliament following the 1999 European elections. A member of the Progressive Alliance of Socialists and Democrats group, he was re-elected in 2004 and 2009.

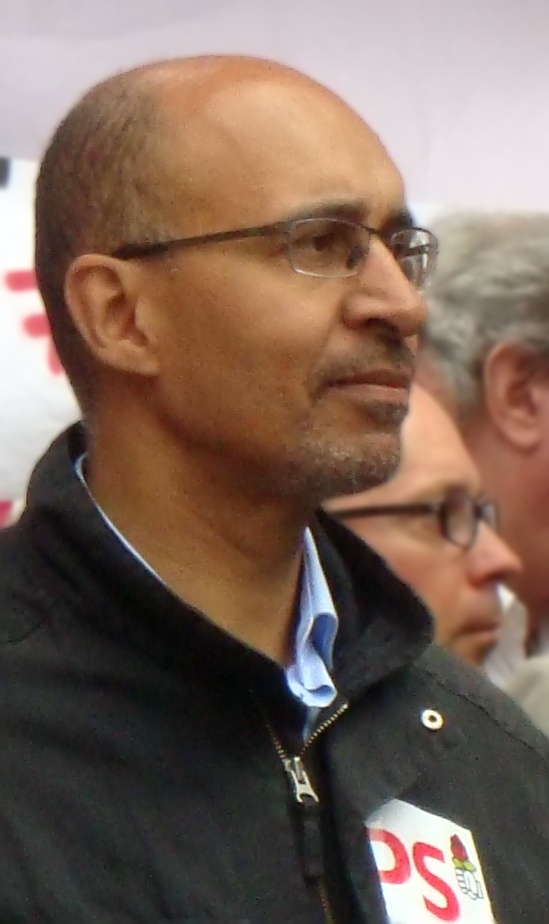
Harlem Désir in 2010.

In his first parliamentary term from 1999 until 2004, Désir served on the Committee on Industry, External Trade, Research and Energy. From 2004 to 2009, he was a member of the Committee on Employment and Social Affairs. In this capacity, he served as the parliament's rapporteur on the 2008 Temporary Agency Work Directive. In his last term, he joined the Committee on International Trade. He also served as deputy chairman of the Progressive Alliance of Socialists and Democrats group, under the leadership of chairman Martin Schulz.

In addition to his committee assignments, Désir was a member of the parliament's delegations for relations with India (2009–2014), the United States (2002–2004) and South Africa (1999–2002). From 2002 to 2004, he also served on the parliament's delegation to the Joint Parliamentary Assembly of the Agreement between the African, Caribbean and Pacific Group of States and the European Union (ACP-EU).

Following the 2004 European elections, Désir became one of the vice-chairpersons of a newly established European Parliament Anti-Racism and Diversity Intergroup (ARDI), alongside Claude Moraes, Saïd El Khadraoui, Emine Bozkurt, Cem Özdemir and Lívia Járóka. He was also a member of the Capital Tax, Fiscal Systems and Globalisation Intergroup of the European Parliament, to whom was presented Denis Robert and Ernest Backes's book, Revelation$, in March 2001.

Désir is considered an ardent pro-European. He fought unsuccessfully in 2005 to convince the Socialist Party to back a new European constitutional treaty.

Ahead of the 2014 European elections, Désir was appointed to head the Socialist Party's list for Ile-de-France. Following his resignation from the European Parliament, he was replaced by Christine Revault d'Allonnes Bonnefoy.

=== Leader of the Socialist Party, 2012–2014 ===
In the 2011 Socialist Party presidential primary, Désir endorsed the campaign of Martine Aubry.

On 30 June 2011, he was the delegate first secretary of the Socialist Party during the Martine Aubry bid for the Socialist Party primary, who started her campaign for presidential election of 2012 on 28 June 2011. After the resignation of Aubry on 16 September 2012, he again became First Secretary of the Socialist Party by interim.

Endorsed by Martine Aubry and Prime Minister Jean-Marc Ayrault before the 2012 Party Congress, he was elected First Secretary of the party on 18 October 2012, fending off competition for the post from another veteran who has also been convicted of financial misconduct, Jean-Christophe Cambadélis. He became the first black person to lead a major European political party. At the time of his election, he had never been a minister or member of the national parliament.

Désir remained head of the party until April 2014, when he stood down after being appointed State Secretary for European Affairs. He was replaced by Jean-Christophe Cambadélis. His resignation was partly explained with his attitude during the Dibrani case.

=== Minister for European Affairs, 2014–2017 ===
On 9 April 2014, French Prime Minister Manuel Valls appointed him Secretary of State for European Affairs at the Ministry of Foreign Affairs and International Development. In February 2015, he was appointed chairman of the General Affairs Council of the Party of European Socialists, a position he held until leaving office.

Shortly after taking office, Désir and his Italian counterpart, Sandro Gozi, set out a list of priorities for the time after the 2014 European elections, saying the new European Commission should grant maximum flexibility within existing EU budget rules to countries undertaking growth-promoting investments and structural economic reforms. Désir also proposed creating a European savings plan to mobilize citizens' savings to invest in small business and priority infrastructure projects such as extending high-speed broadband and the transition to renewable energy.

On the sidelines of an informal U.N. General Assembly meeting on the rising threat of antisemitism in January 2015, Désir joined his German counterpart Michael Roth in appealing for U.N. member states to work together on an international legal framework that would make social network providers share responsibility for the use of their platforms to spread messages promoting violence; the French call for a radical shift in the way governments treat social networking companies such as Facebook and Twitter came two weeks after the Charlie Hebdo shooting in Paris.

Ahead of the Socialist Party's 2017 primaries, Désir endorsed Valls as the party's candidate for the presidential election later that year.

== Later career ==
Désir was appointed Representative on Freedom of the Media by the Organization for Security and Co-operation in Europe for a term of three years beginning 18 July 2017. In 2019 he caused controversy in Albania by supporting a controversial package of law changes proposed by Albanian Prime Minister Edi Rama. In June 2020, Azerbaijan blocked a package of preliminary renewal mandates for all top OSCE officials, including Désir, and issued a letter of protest over Désir's pending reappointment in particular. Tajikistan subsequently joined in opposing the renewal.

In 2021, Désir became the Senior Vice President, Europe of the International Rescue Committee.

Since 2023, Désir has been part of the Centre for European Policy Studies/Heinrich Böll Foundation High-Level Group on Bolstering EU Democracy, chaired by Kalypso Nicolaïdis.

== Personal life ==
Désir is a Roman Catholic.

He married, in 1985, Marianne Sauterey, secretary of the socialist group in the National Assembly, from whom he divorced in 1988. He then had two children with the journalist Anna Angeli, daughter of Claude Angeli, leader of Le Canard enchaîné.

When he joined the government in 2014, he declared assets of €48,442.

== Awards ==
- Sweden - Olof Palme Prize (1990)
- Greece - Grand Cross of the Order of the Phoenix (2016)
- Germany - Knight Commander's Cross of the Order of Merit (2018) (presented by Michael Roth).

Party political offices
Preceded by Martine Aubry	Leader of the Socialist Party; 2012–2014	Succeeded by Jean-Christophe Cambadélis
Preceded by François Rebsamen	National Secretary for the Coordination of the Socialist Party; 2008–2012	Succeeded by Guillaume Bachelay
Non-profit organization positions
Preceded by Position created	President of SOS Racism; 1984–1992	Succeeded by Fodé Sylla
