= Aisne's 2nd constituency =

Constituency of the National Assembly of France

2nd constituency of the Aisne
- inline Constituency of the National Assembly of France

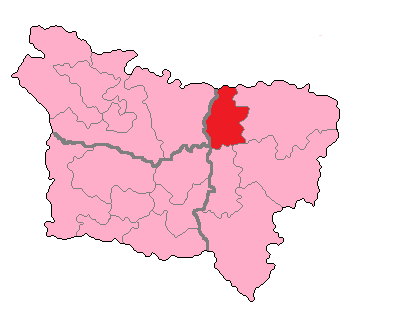
- Ainse's 2nd constituency shown within Picardie
- Deputy: Julien Dive; LR
- Department: Aisne
- Cantons: Le Catelet, Moy-de-l'Aisne, Saint-Quentin Centre, Saint-Quentin Nord, Saint-Quentin Sud, Saint-Simon, Vermand
- Registered voters: 73,254

The 2nd constituency of the Aisne is a French legislative constituency in the Aisne département.

== Description ==
Aisne's 2nd constituency surrounds the city of Saint-Quentin in the north west of the department.

Historically the seat has swung between left and right. It has seen long periods of both Gaullist and Communist control.

At the 2012 elections former Minister of Social Affairs and Employment and UMP Chairman Xavier Bertrand held on to seat by only 222 votes.

More recently, the seat has been more firmly right, with the second round in both 2017 and 2022 being between the Republicans and National Front/National Rally.

== Historic representation ==
Election	Member	Party
1958	Edmond Bricout	UNR
1967	Edmond Bricout	UDR
1968	Edmond Bricout	UDR
1973	Daniel Le Meur	PCF
1978	Daniel Le Meur	PCF
1981	Daniel Le Meur	PCF
1986	Proportional representation - no election by constituency	
1988	Daniel Le Meur	PCF
1993	Charles Baur	UDF
1997	Odette Grzegrzulka	PS
2002	Xavier Bertrand	UMP
2007	Xavier Bertrand	UMP
2012	Xavier Bertrand	UMP
2016	Julien Dive	LR
2017	Julien Dive	LR
2022	Julien Dive	LR
2024	Julien Dive	LR

== Election results ==
=== 2024 ===
Candidate	Party	Alliance	First round		Second round	
Candidate	Party	Alliance	Votes	%	Votes	%
Julien Dive	LR	UDC	16,288	35.66	22,933	50.58
Philippe Torre	LR-RN	UXD	21,496	47.06	22,409	49.42
Anne-Sophie Dujancourt	LFI	NFP	6,511	14.26		
Didier Kaczmarek	REC		561	1.23		
Corinne Bécourt*	PCF	diss.	497	1.09		
Anne-Catherine Zanditenas	LO		322	0.70		
Valid votes			45,675	97.82	45,342	97.26
Blank votes			716	1.53	888	1.90
Null votes			303	0.65	390	0.84
Turnout			46,694	63.82	46,620	63.71
Abstentions			26,471	36.18	26,561	36.29
Registered voters			73,165		73,181	
Result			LR HOLD			

* PCF dissident without the support of the New Popular Front alliance

=== 2022 ===
Candidate	Party	Alliance	First round		Second round	
Candidate	Party	Alliance	Votes	%	Votes	%
Julien Dive	LR	UDC	11,704	35.91	17,463	58.17
Lola Powerful	RN		9,331	28.63	12,558	41.83
Sulyvan Ransquin	LFI	NUPES	5,757	17.66		
Fatima El Ousadi	LREM	ENS	3,755	11.52		
Cécé Ameoui	REC		938	2.88		
Corinne Bécourt*	PCF	(diss.)	505	1.55		
Anne Zanditénas	EXG		315	0.97		
Eric Lepeuple	DVG		288	0.88		
Valid votes		32,593	98.02	30,021	94.28	
Blank votes			473	1.42	1,332	4.18
Null votes			187	0.56	489	1.54
Turnout			33,253	45.44	31,842	43.51
Abstentions			39,923	54.56	41,347	56.49
Registered voters			73,176		73,189	
Result			LR HOLD			

Corinne Bécourt ran as a PCF dissident, without the endorsement of (NUPES).

=== 2017 ===
Candidate	Label	First round		Second round	
Candidate	Label	Votes	%	Votes	%
Julien Dive	LR	12,099	36.48	19,019	64.97
Sylvie Saillard-Meunier	FN	8,349	25.17	10,255	35.03
Paul Gironde	DIV	4,005	12.07		
Sarah Lempereur	FI	3,457	10.42		
Karl Pincherelle	PS	2,309	6.96		
Michel Magniez	ECO	721	2.17		
Corinne Bécourt	PCF	694	2.09		
Jean-Christophe Seube	DLF	607	1.83		
Anne Zanditénas	EXG	297	0.90		
Antonio Ribeiro	DVG	191	0.58		
Antoine Cid	DIV	174	0.52		
Nora Daubin	ECO	163	0.49		
Belaïdi Lograda	DIV	103	0.31		
Votes		33,169	100.00	29,274	100.00
Valid votes		33,169	97.20	29,274	92.48
Blank votes		685	2.01	1,672	5.28
Null votes		270	0.79	709	2.24
Turnout		34,124	46.13	31,655	42.79
Abstentions		39,857	53.87	42,321	57.21
Registered voters		73,981		73,976	
Source: Ministry of the Interior

=== 2012 ===
Summary of the 10 June and 17 June 2012 French legislative in Aisne's 2nd Constituency election results
Candidate	Party		1st round		2nd round	
Candidate	Party		Votes	%	Votes	%
Xavier Bertrand	Union for a Popular Movement	UMP	17,404	38.89%	22,445	50.25%
Anne Ferreira	Socialist Party	PS	15,874	35.47%	22,223	49.75%
Yannick Lejeune	National Front	FN	7,289	16.29%		
Guy Fontaine	Left Front	FG	2,123	4.74%		
Paul Gironde	Centre	CEN	623	1.39%		
Michel Aurigny	Far Left	EXG	296	0.66%		
Jean-Thierry Gampert	Far Right	EXD	276	0.62%		
Anne Zanditenas	Far Left	EXG	242	0.54%		
Sylvie Glinatsis	Ecologist	ECO	225	0.50%		
Guillaume Buil	Ecologist	ECO	222	0.50%		
Antonio Ribeiro	Miscellaneous Left	DVG	178	0.40%		
Total			44,752	100%	44,668	100%
Registered voters			73,249		73,254	
Blank/Void ballots			583	1.29%	1,315	2.86%
Turnout			45,335	61.89%	45,983	62.77%
Abstentions			27,914	38.11%	27,271	37.23%
Result					UMP HOLD	

=== 2007 ===
Legislative Election 2007: Aisne 2nd
Party	Candidate	Votes	%	±%
UMP	Xavier Bertrand	24,007	52.28	
PS	Odette Grzegrzulka	10,278	22.81	
FN	Michèle Dall'ara	2,382	5.29	
PCF	Jean-Luc Tournay	2,191	4.86	
MoDem	Ahmed Bahaddou	1,298	2.88	
MRC	Freddy Grzeziczak	1,195	2.65	
LCR	Franck Mousset	847	1.88	
CPNT	Alain Betems	525	1.17	
LV	Nora Ahmed-Ali	470	1.04	
LO	Anne Zanditenas	461	1.02	
Workers' Party	Nicole Aurigny	347	0.77	
GE	Daniel Wargnier	336	0.75	
MNR	Marie-José Guillet	276	0.61	
MPF	Carmel Desjoyaux	261	0.58	
DVE	Bertrand Sene	184	0.41	
Turnout		45,058	61.45	
UMP hold		Swing		

== Sources ==
- Official results of French elections from 1998: "Résultats électoraux officiels en France" (in French). Archived from the original on 20 December 2011.
