= Paul Raoult =

French politician (born 1944)

Paul Raoult (born 26 November 1944 in Rieux-en-Cambrésis) is a former member of the Senate of France, who represented the Nord department from 1992 to 2011 as a member of the Socialist Party.

== See also ==
- Politics in France
