= Caroline Cayeux =

French politician and Mayor of Beauvais

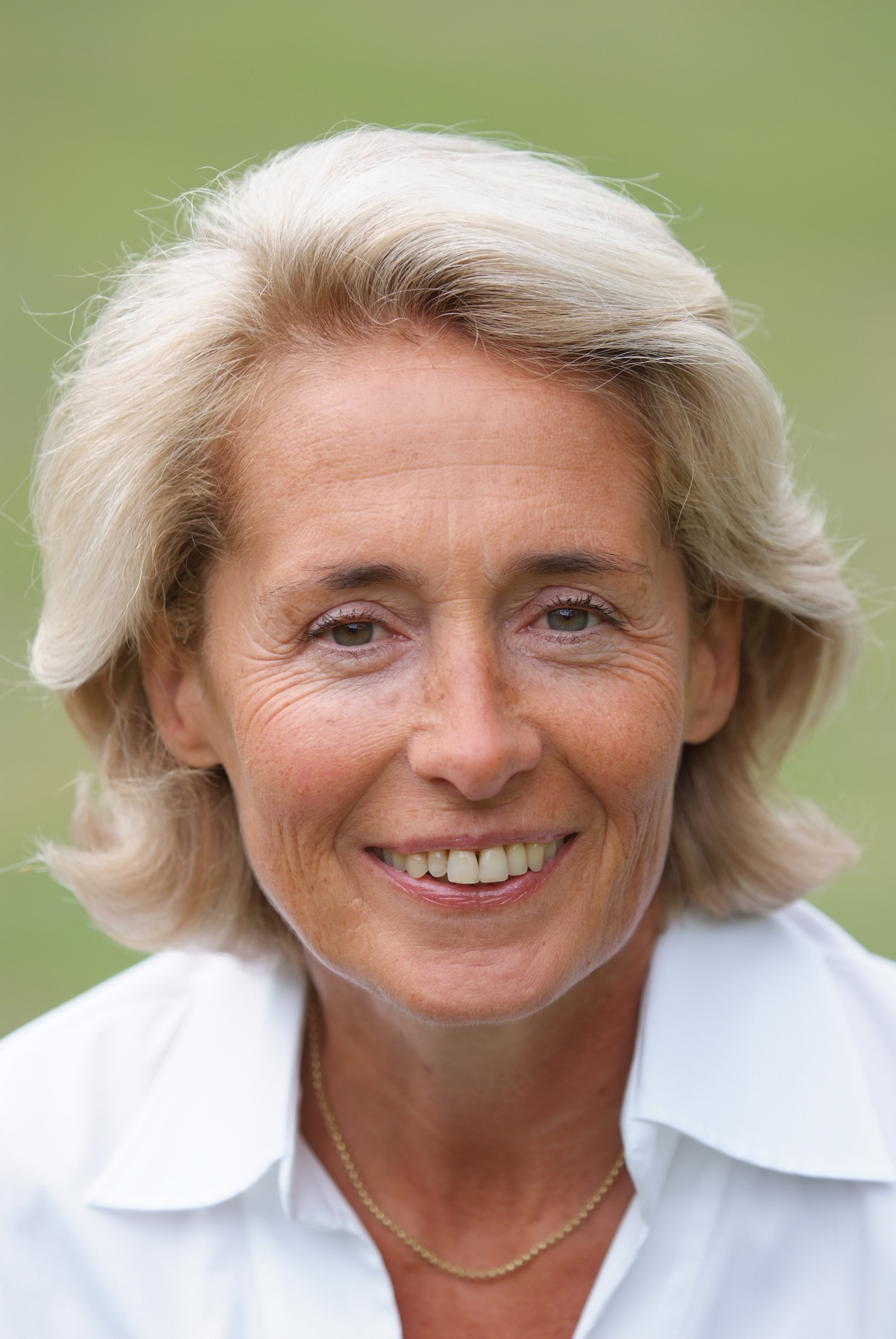

Minister for Relations with Local Authorities
- In office 4 July 2022 – 28 November 2022
- President: Emmanuel Macron
- Prime Minister: Élisabeth Borne
- Preceded by: Christophe Béchu
- Succeeded by: Dominique Faure

Mayor of Beauvais
- In office 18 March 2001 – 31 August 2022
- Preceded by: Walter Amsallem
- Succeeded by: Franck Pia

Member of the French Senate for Oise
- In office 1 October 2011 – 1 October 2017
- Preceded by: Alain Vasselle
- Succeeded by: Olivier Paccaud

Personal details
- Born: Caroline Laurence Fournier; 1 November 1948 (age 77) 16th arrondissement of Paris, France
- Party: RPR (1981-2002); UMP (2002-2015); The Republicans (2015-2018); Miscellaneous right (since 2018)

Caroline Cayeux (French pronunciation: [kaʁɔlin kajø]; born 1 November 1948) is a French politician who has been serving as Minister for Relations with Local Authorities in the government of Prime Minister Élisabeth Borne between July 2022 and November 2022.

Prior to joining the government, Cayeux served as mayor of Beauvais.

== Political career ==
Cayeux became Departmental President of Oise for the Rally for the Republic in 1998, after the incumbent, Jean-François Mancel was forced to resign for entering into an electoral and political alliance with the far-right FN.

Cayeux defeated the incumbent Socialist Party Mayor of Beauvais Walter Amsallem in the 2001 election and was re-elected with 58% in 2008 against Sylvie Houssin of the PS.

Cayeux was defeated as a RPR dissident candidate in the 2002 French legislative election and as a candidate on the UMP list in the 2004 Senate election. She became regional councilor of Picardy in 2004, on the UMP-UDF list of Gilles de Robien.

Cayeux was the only candidate for the UMP nomination in Picardy for the 2010 regional elections and will thus be the UMP's top candidate.

== Controversy ==
In 2018, Cayeux made international news playing an April Fools' Day prank via social media, claiming that furniture giant IKEA would be bringing 4,000 new jobs to Beauvais; the prank was not well received across social media

Following Cayeux's appointment to the Borne government, more than 100 French public figures signed an open letter denouncing her opposition to a 2013 law for same-sex marriage and adoption which Cayeux had called a "caprice" and "plan that goes against nature".
