= Michel Souplet =

French politician (1929–2020)

Michel Edmond Alfred Souplet (3 April 1929 – 14 May 2020) was a French politician who served as a Senator.
