= Itancourt =

- Commune
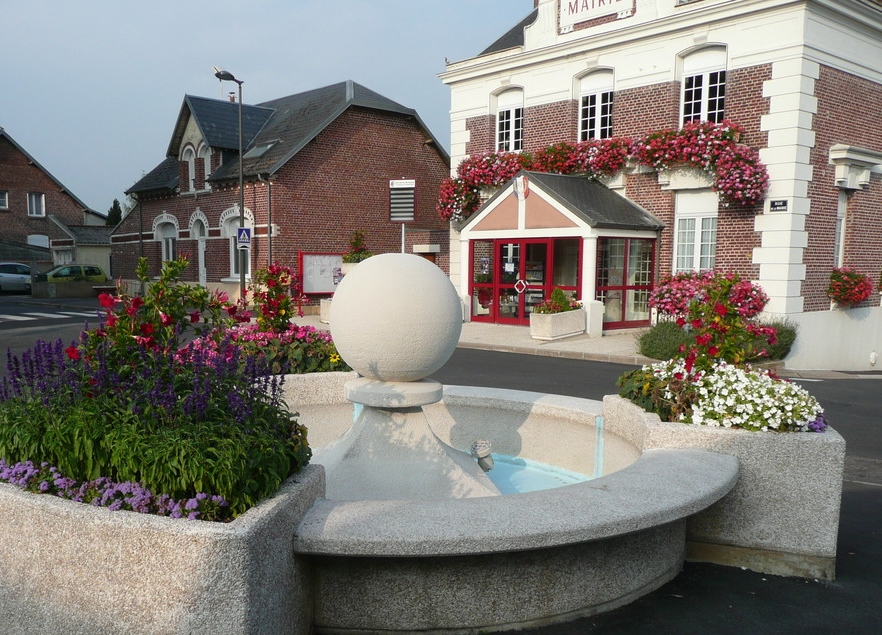
- The town hall of Itancourt
- Location of Itancourt
- Location within France Location within Hauts-de-France
- Coordinates: 49°48′27″N 3°20′45″E
- Country: France
- Region: Hauts-de-France
- Department: Aisne
- Arrondissement: Saint-Quentin
- Canton: Ribemont
- Intercommunality: Val de l'Oise

Government
  - Mayor (2026–32): Nathalie Dive-Fremaux
- Area^{1}: 7.11 km^{2} (2.75 sq mi)
- Elevation: 100 m (330 ft)
- Highest elevation: 122 m (400 ft)
- Lowest elevation: 73 m (240 ft)
- Population (2023): 999
  - Density: 141/km^{2} (364/sq mi)
- Time zone: UTC+01:00 (CET)
  - Summer (DST): UTC+02:00 (CEST)
- INSEE/Postal code: 02387 /02240
- ^{1} French Land Register data, which excludes lakes, ponds, glaciers > 1 km^{2} (0.386 sq mi or 247 acres) and river estuaries.

Itancourt (French pronunciation: [itɑ̃kuʁ]) is a commune in the Aisne department in Hauts-de-France in northern France.

== Population ==
Historical population
Year	Pop.	±% p.a.
1968	566	—
1975	671	+2.46%
1982	751	+1.62%
1990	998	+3.62%
1999	1,048	+0.54%
2007	1,120	+0.83%
2012	1,086	−0.61%
2017	1,031	−1.03%
2023	999	−0.52%
Source: INSEE

== See also ==
- Communes of the Aisne department
