= David Assouline =

French politician (born 1959)

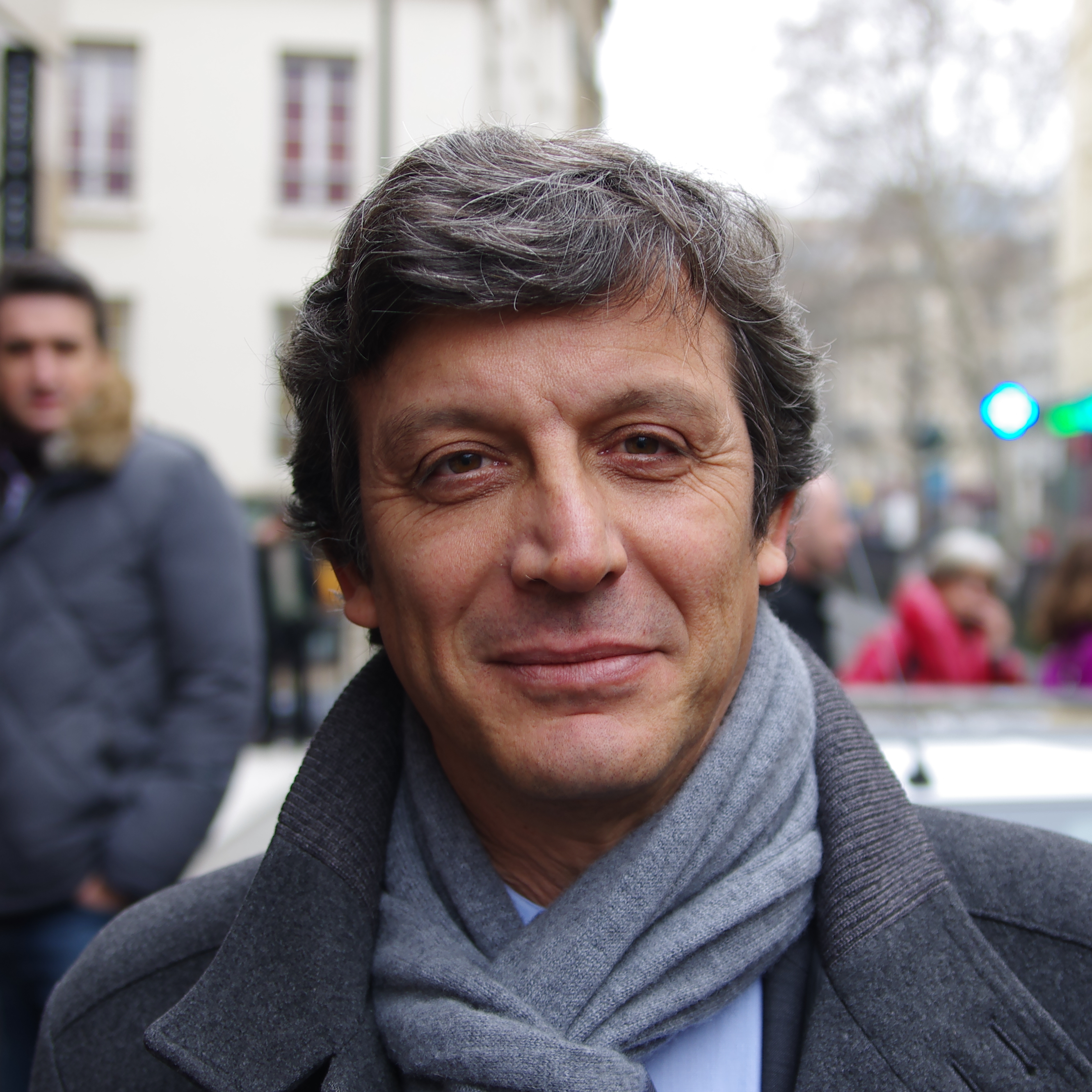
- David Assouline in 2013

Member of the French Senate for Paris
- Incumbent
- Assumed office 26 September 2004

Personal details
- Born: 16 June 1959 (age 66) Sefrou, Morocco
- Party: Socialist Party

David Assouline (French pronunciation: [david asulin]; born 16 June 1959) is a French politician of the Socialist Party (PS) who has been serving as a member of the Senate of France since 2004, representing the city of Paris. He is simultaneously a councillor for the 20th arrondissement of Paris.

== Political career ==
In the Socialist Party's 2011 primaries, Assouline endorsed Martine Aubry as the party's candidate for the 2012 presidential election.

== Other activities ==
Assouline is a board member of the France 2 television network and a member of the Digital Dividend Commission (Commission du dividende numérique), which recommended reallocation of frequencies made available by the ending of analogue broadcasting. Previously he has served as a member of the French Group of the Inter-Parliamentary Union and as a member of the Women's Rights and Equal Opportunity Commission (Délégation aux droits des femmes et à l'égalité des chances entre les hommes et les femmes).

== Works (with Mehdi Lallaoui) ==
Assouline is a historian who has written a 3-volume survey of France's relationship with its immigrants. However, he is best known for his work on the harsh repression of Algerians living in France during the Algerian War.

- Un siècle d’immigration, Au Nom de la Mémoire (ANM)
- 1996, Vol. 1: Un siècle d'immigrations en France (1851–1918), 144 pp., ISBN 978-2-84146-320-6
- 1996, Vol. 2: Un siècle d'immigrations en France (1919–1945), 144 pp., ISBN 978-2-910780-01-2
- 1997, Vol. 3: Un siècle d'immigrations en France (de 1945 à nos jours), 144 pp., ISBN 978-2-84146-472-2
- 2001: A propos d’octobre 1961, Au Nom de la Mémoire
