= Annie Jarraud-Vergnolle =

French politician (born 1948)

Annie Jarraud-Vergnolle (born 7 February 1948) is a member of the Senate of France, representing the Pyrénées-Atlantiques department. She is a member of the Socialist Party.
