= Philippe Marini =

French politician

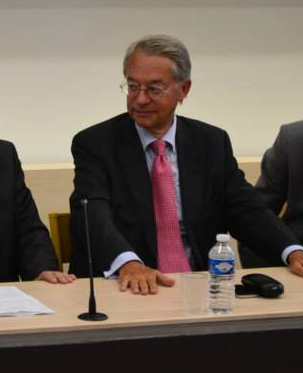

Mayor of Compiègne
- Incumbent
- Assumed office 19 March 1987
- Preceded by: Jean Legendre

Member of the French Senate for Oise
- In office 2 October 1992 – 8 January 2015
- Succeeded by: Alain Vasselle

President of the Finance Committee in the Senate
- In office 2011–2014
- Preceded by: Jean Arthuis
- Succeeded by: Michèle André

Personal details
- Born: 28 January 1950 (age 76) Paris, France
- Party: The Republicans
- Education: Lycée Condorcet
- Alma mater: Sciences Po; Panthéon-Assas University; École nationale d'administration

Philippe Marini (French pronunciation: [filip maʁini]; born 28 January 1950) is a former member of the Senate of France, who represented the Oise department. He is a member of the Union for a Popular Movement. He is of Italian origin.

From September 1992, Senator Marini was an influential senator, focusing on many issues related to banking and international finance. Marini holds a law degree and is considered an expert on French and international financial matters. Prior to public service as an elected leader in France, Senator Marini was a professor at several universities. A long-term member of UMP, Marini has been an active participant in preparing the economic reform plan of a fellow UMP member, President of France Nicolas Sarkozy.

== Bibliography ==
- Page on the Senate website
