= Lille-Saint-Sauveur station =

Railway station in Lille, France

Coordinates: 50°37′35″N 3°04′27″E

Lille-Saint-Sauveur station Gare de Lille-Saint-Sauveur
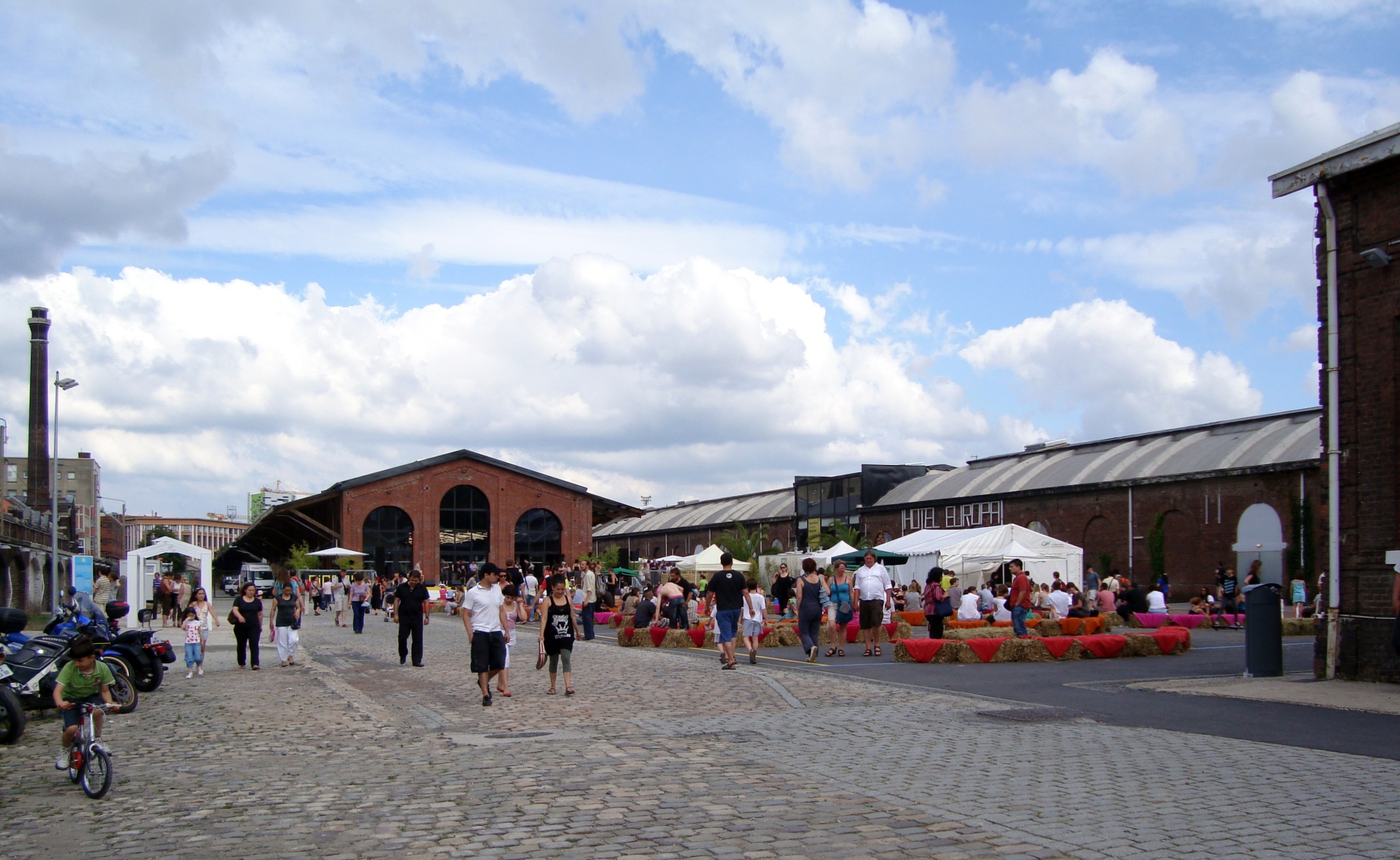
- Entrance

General information
- Location: 17, Boulevard Jean-Baptiste Lebas; 59000 Lille
- System: Terminus

Other information
- Station code: 87286039

History
- Opened: 1865
- Closed: 2003
Location

Lille-Saint-Sauveur is a former goods train station of Lille which had some of its buildings converted into recreational areas and an exhibition hall on the occasion of the events of Lille 3000 in 2009.

== History ==
Ten years after the opening of the first railway station of Lille, Lille-Flandres station in 1848, the city annexed the neighboring towns of Moulins, Wazemmes, Fives, and Esquermes. That was when the idea of building a larger station in the south emerged. The new station was created in 1861 by imperial decree, and construction finished in 1864. Station Fives-Saint-Sauveur was initially supposed to become the main train station in Lille, but due to its location, which then seemed relatively far from the historical center, eventually led to a freight station.

After entering into service of multimodal Dourges Delta 3, the station stopped its activities in 2001 and Sernam ceased to operate in December 2003. This raised the question of how to convert the 20 acres it occupies. The project is not yet finalized, but in 2008 the rehabilitation work of two of its halls have been undertaken as part of the organization of events in 2009 Lille 3000:

Hall A, with an area of 1,000 m^{2} (11,000 sq ft). The building, which dates from the nineteenth century, now houses a bar, a restaurant and a cinema. Hall B, with an area of 5,000 m^{2} (54,000 sq ft). The building, constructed during the 1920s, was converted into an exhibition space and event planning.

Martine Aubry, mayor of Lille, announced her candidacy for president in this former train station.
