= Charles Baur =

French politician

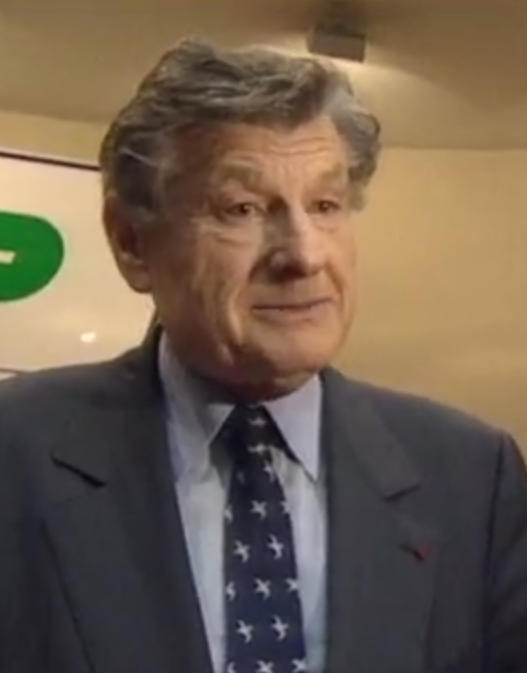
- Charles Baur in 1998

President of the Regional Council of Picardy
- In office 1985–2004
- Preceded by: Walter Amsallem
- Succeeded by: Claude Gewerc

Personal details
- Born: 20 December 1929; Paris, France
- Died: 2 January 2015 (aged 85); Morocco
- Political party: UMP

Charles Baur (20 December 1929 – 2 January 2015) was a French politician. He served as the longtime President of the Regional Council of Picardy from 1976 until 1978 and again from 1985 to 2004. He was a member of the Union for French Democracy (UDF) and a founding member of the now defunct Social Democratic Party.

Baur was born in Paris, France, on 20 December 1929. He served as the mayor of Villers-Cotterets from 1954 to 1989.

Charles Baur was first elected President of the Regional Council of Picardy in 1976. He held the office for two years, before ceding it to his successor, Max Lejeune, in 1978. He regained the Presidency of the Regional Council in 1985. Baur won re-election in 1986 and 1992. He won re-election again in 1998, thanks to an alliance with the National Front.

He served as an MEP from December 1986 to 1989. In 1983, Baur was elected to the National Assembly of France representing Aisne's 2nd constituency as a member of the Union for French Democracy (UDF). He served as a deputy in the National Assembly from 28 March 1993 to 21 April 1997.

Baur retired from politics and the Presidency of the Regional Council of Picardy in 2004. The former President of COMIR, a French holding company, his estimated net worth was believed to be 85 Million Euros, according to Challenges magazine.

Charles Baur died in Morocco on 2 January 2015, at the age of 85.
