= Claude Gewerc =

French politician (1947–2024)

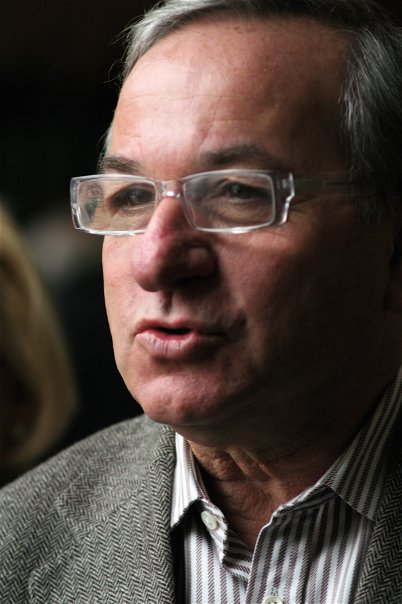
- Gewerc in 2009

President of the Regional Council of Picardy
- In office 28 March 2004 – 31 December 2015
- Preceded by: Charles Baur
- Succeeded by: Office abolished

Mayor of Clermont, Oise
- In office November 2001 – May 2004
- Preceded by: André Vantomme
- Succeeded by: Lionnel Ollivier

Personal details
- Born: Claude Gewerc; 21 June 1947; Bergen-Belsen, Lower Saxony, Germany
- Died: 7 October 2024 (aged 77); Clermont, Oise, France
- Political party: Socialist Party (1977–2015)

Claude Gewerc (French pronunciation: [klod ʒevɛʁk]; 21 June 1947 – 7 October 2024) was a German-born French politician who served as President of the regional council of Picardy.

== Political career ==
In March 1998, Gewerc was elected to the Regional Council of Picardy to represent the Oise, and was leader of the Socialist group in the regional council from 1998 to 2004, at which date he defeated the incumbent UDF administration to become Regional president. From 2001 to 2004, he served as Mayor of Clermont, Oise.

In the Socialist Party's 2011 primaries, Gewerc endorsed Martine Aubry as the party's candidate for the 2012 presidential election.

In December 2015, Gewerc left the Socialist Party. Thereafter, he ceased involvement in politics.

== Death ==
Gewerc died on 7 October 2024 in Clermont, Oise at the age of 77.
