= Alain Vasselle =

French politician

Member of the French Senate for Oise
- In office 8 January 2015 – 1 October 2017
- Preceded by: Philippe Marini
- In office 27 September 1992 – 25 September 2011
- Succeeded by: Caroline Cayeux

Personal details
- Born: 27 June 1947 (age 77)
- Political party: The Republicans
- Profession: Farmer

Alain Vasselle (French pronunciation: [alɛ̃ vasɛl]; born 27 June 1947) is a former member of the Senate of France, representing the Oise department. He is a member of the Union for a Popular Movement.
