= André Vantomme =

French politician

André Vantomme (French pronunciation: [ɑ̃dʁe vɑ̃tɔm]; born 16 February 1948 in Bondues) is a former member of the Senate of France, who represented the Oise department. He is a member of the Socialist Party.
