= Martine Aubry =

French politician (born 1950)

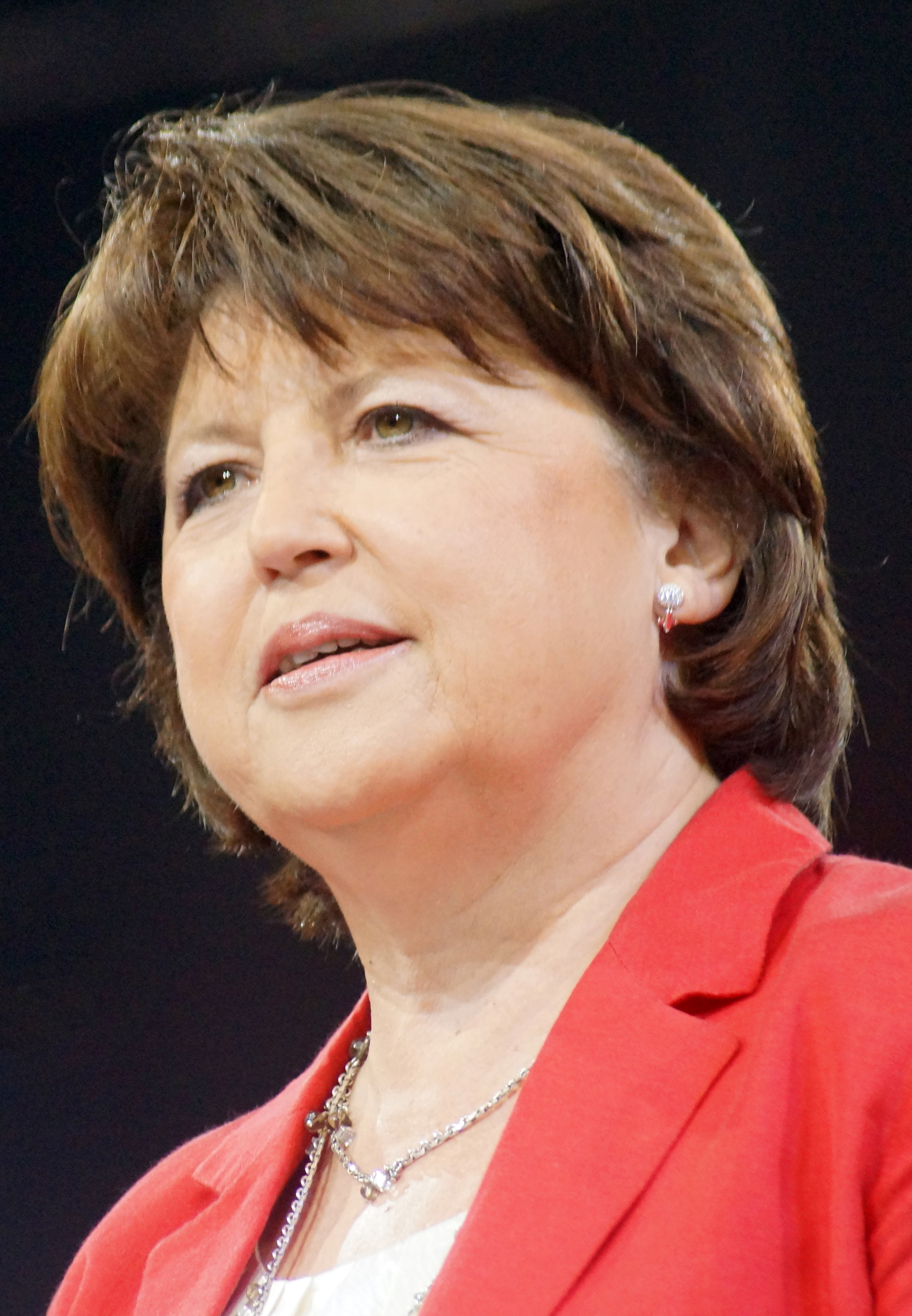
- Aubry in 2012

First Secretary of the Socialist Party
- In office 26 November 2008 – 12 September 2012*
- Preceded by: François Hollande
- Succeeded by: Harlem Désir

Mayor of Lille
- In office 25 March 2001 – 21 March 2025
- Preceded by: Pierre Mauroy
- Succeeded by: Arnaud Deslandes

Minister of Social Affairs
- In office 2 June 1997 – 18 October 2000
- Prime Minister: Lionel Jospin
- Preceded by: Jean-Claude Gaudin
- Succeeded by: Élisabeth Guigou

Minister of Labour, Employment and Vocational Training
- In office 15 May 1991 – 28 March 1993
- Prime Minister: Édith Cresson; Pierre Bérégovoy
- Preceded by: Jean-Pierre Soisson
- Succeeded by: Michel Giraud

Member of the National Assembly for Nord's 5th Constituency
- In office 12 June 1997 – 4 July 1997
- Preceded by: Bernard Davoine
- Succeeded by: Bernard Davoine

Personal details
- Born: Martine Louise Marie Delors; 8 August 1950 (age 76) Paris, France
- Party: Socialist Party
- Parent: Jacques Delors (father)
- Education: Pantheon-Assas University; Sciences Po; École Nationale d'Administration
- Harlem Désir served as Acting Leader from 30 June 2011 – 16 October 2011.

Martine Louise Marie Aubry (French: [maʁtin obʁi]; née Delors; born 8 August 1950) is a French politician. She was the First Secretary of the French Socialist Party (Parti Socialiste, or PS) from November 2008 to April 2012, and was the Mayor of Lille from March 2001 to March 2025; she is the first woman to hold either position. Her father, Jacques Delors, served as Minister of Finance under President François Mitterrand and was also President of the European Commission.

Aubry joined the PS in 1974, and was appointed Minister of Labour by Prime Minister Édith Cresson in 1991, but lost her position in 1993 after the Right won the legislative elections. However, she became Minister of Social Affairs when Lionel Jospin was appointed Prime Minister in 1997. She is mostly known for having pushed the popular 35-hour workweek law, known as the "Loi Aubry", reducing the nominal length of the normal full-time working week from 39 to 35 hours, and the law that created Couverture maladie universelle (Universal health care coverage).

Aubry stepped down from her Cabinet post in 2000 to be elected Mayor of Lille in 2001, succeeding Pierre Mauroy. Aubry subsequently lost her seat in the National Assembly in the general election of 2002. In March 2008, she was re-elected Mayor of Lille, with 66.55% of the votes.

In November 2008, Aubry was elected to lead the Socialist Party, narrowly defeating Ségolène Royal. While Royal disputed the results, the Socialist Party declared on 25 November 2008 that Aubry had won the contested election. On 28 June 2011, Martine Aubry announced she would seek the Socialist nomination to run in the 2012 presidential election, ultimately losing to François Hollande, her predecessor as First Secretary.

== Biography ==
=== Early life and education ===
Born in Paris, Aubry is the daughter of Jacques Delors, French Minister of Finance (1981–1985) and European Commission President (1985–1995), and his wife Marie. Aubry was educated at the lycée Notre-Dame-des-Oiseaux and the lycée Paul-Valéry (in Paris). She holds a degree in economic science from Panthéon-Assas University.

She did additional studies, gaining a diploma from the Institut des Sciences Sociales du Travail, and one from the Institut d'Études Politiques de Paris (or Sciences Po) in 1972. Between 1973 and 1975, Aubry studied at the École nationale d'administration (ÉNA, National School of Administration).

=== Professional career ===
In 1975 Aubry became a civil administrator at the Ministry of Labor and Social Affairs (Ministère du Travail et des Affaires sociales). During this period, she was active within the French Democratic Confederation of Labour (CFDT). She became a professor at ÉNA in 1978. In addition, she was seconded to the State Council between 1980 and 1981.

Following the election of François Mitterrand to the French presidency in 1981, Aubry successively held several posts at the Ministry of Social Affairs, in the cabinets of Jean Auroux and Pierre Bérégovoy. In 1984, she investigated French asbestos policy for the Comité Permanent Amiante (Permanent Asbestos Committee, an informal public-private working group formed to manage the health problems of workers affected by asbestos). The group's deputy director, Jean-Luc Pasquier, testified before the courts to account for the group's members' actions.

After the defeat of the socialists in the French legislative election of 1986, Aubry was named Master of Requests at the State Council. From 1989 to 1991 she worked as Assistant Director at Pechiney, working with Jean Gandois. She was involved with the opening of a plant at Dunkerque and the closure of the aluminium works at Noguères.

== Political career ==
=== Minister of Labour, Employment and Vocational Training: 1991–1993 ===
Aubry was named Minister of Labour, Employment and Vocational Training by Édith Cresson, and carried on in this capacity in the Bérégovoy ministry until March 1993. According to Jean-Luc Pasquier, she supported the controlled use of asbestos whilst all other members of the EEC supported an outright ban. She caused the French veto of a European decree against the use of asbestos. France did not ban asbestos until 1997.

In January 2010, a public health judge charged with investigating former government measures on asbestos had Aubry interrogated by gendarmes in Lille.

When the Right came into power at the French legislative election in 1986, Aubry started the Fondation Agir Contre l'Exclusion (FACE, the Act Against Exclusion Foundation). In 1995, Pierre Mauroy named her as the first deputy to the Mayor of Lille, thus giving her a foothold in the department of Nord.

Lionel Jospin, who became the socialist candidate as French President in 1995, made her his campaign spokesman during the presidential campaign. Upon his defeat, Jospin became first secretary of the Socialist Party, and offered her the number two spot, which Aubry refused.

Aubry had good relations with part of the establishment, especially with her former Pechiney boss, Jean Gandois, and the Parti communiste francais. But she did not get on well with the unions, in particular with Nicole Notat, the former General Secretary of the CFDT.

Aubry has been described as hard and demanding. She counters, "Je dis les choses en face, je ne suis pas faux-cul. Mais je crois être bien moins dure que beaucoup de gens en politique. Je suis même peut-être trop sensible. (I'm up-front, and I'm not a hypocrite. But I think I'm much less hard than many politicians. I may even be too sensitive.) "

=== Minister of Employment and Solidarity: 1997–2000 ===
Elected as a member of the National Assembly, Aubry was appointed in 1997 as Minister of Employment and Solidarity, the most important minister after the Prime Minister. The same year, to fight unemployment, she created a new employment contract for young people (Emplois-jeunes) with financial help from the government. In 1998, a law establishing the 35-hour workweek was adopted.

In 1999, the Couverture maladie universelle (CMU), a program that reimburses medical expenses through social security for everyone, was voted through. Furthermore, for people on low incomes, the CMU offers complementary health coverage of 100%, which is added to standard Social Security payments; this avoids the necessity for additional private (top-up) insurance.

=== 2012 Presidential candidacy ===
On 28 June 2011, Aubry said in a televised address from the former train station of Lille-Saint-Sauveur: "I have decided to propose my candidacy to the presidential election".

Following the first round of the citizens primary, she faced François Hollande in the second round of voting on 16 October in a two-way runoff. In the final round of voting, Hollande won the nomination with 56.6% of the vote.

After Aubry's defeat in the primaries, she became one of the main supporters of the Francois Hollande presidential campaign. Aubry's name had been mentioned as a potential prime minister for François Hollande. But, after Hollande was elected President, he chose Jean-Marc Ayrault as Prime Minister; Aubry refused to join his cabinet.

=== From 2014: statements of divergence ===
On several occasions, Aubry expressed criticism of the Manuel Valls government, including the fact that he was chosen. In October 2014, she asked for a reorientation of the economic policy.

During a press conference held on 23 September 2015, where Aubry confirmed the choice of Pierre de Saintignon as the head of list for the next coming Regional Elections, she said that the bad polls of the list are partly caused by some choices of the government. She was criticising Emmanuel Macron, Minister of Economy since 2014, saying: "Macron? How to tell it... The cup is full."

Ahead of the Socialist Party's 2017 primaries, Aubry publicly endorsed Benoît Hamon as the party's candidate for the presidential election later that year.

== Political positions held ==
- Governmental functions
  - Minister of Labor, Employment and Training 1991–1993
  - Minister of Employment and Solidarity 1997–2000 (resignation)
- Electoral mandates
  - National Assembly of France
    - Member of the National Assembly of France for Nord (5th constituency): elected in 1997, but became minister in June
  - Municipal Council
    - Mayor of Lille 2001–2025. Reelected in 2014, 2020
    - Deputy-mayor of Lille: 1995–2001
    - Municipal councillor of Lille since 1995. Reelected in 2001, 2008
  - Urban community Council
    - President of the Urban Community of Lille Métropole 2008-2014
    - Vice-president of the Urban Community of Lille Métropole 1995–2008. Reelected in 2001
    - Member of the Urban Community of Lille Métropole since 1995. Reelected in 2001, 2008
- Political function
    - First Secretary (leader) of the Socialist Party (France) 2008–2012

== Bibliography ==
- 1982 : Pratique de la fonction personnel : le management des ressources humaines; Martine Aubry, Pierre Balloy, Robert Bosquet, Pierre Cazamian... [etc.] sous la direction de Dimitri Weiss... avec la collaboration de Pierre Morin; Publication : Paris : Éditions d'Organisation, 1982; Description matérielle : 644 p. : ill.; 25 cm; ISBN 2-7081-0477-2
- 1992 : Le chômage de longue durée : comprendre, agir, évaluer : actes du Colloque Agir contre le chômage de longue durée, les 18 et 19 novembre 1991 à la Maison de la chimie à Paris / [organisé par le Ministère du travail, Délégation à l'emploi et la Mission interministérielle Recherche expérimentation, MIRE; textes réunis par Patricia Bouillaguet et Christophe Guitton; préf. par Martine Aubry; Colloque Agir contre le chômage de longue durée (1991; Paris) France. Mission interministérielle recherche-expérimentation; Publication : Paris : Syros-Alternatives, 1992; Description matérielle : 745 p. : graph.; 24 cm; ISBN 2-86738-745-0
- 1994 : Le choix d'agir; Aubry, Martine; Publication : Albin Michel, 1994; ISBN 2-226-06801-5
- 1995 : Carnet de route d'un maire de banlieue : entre innovations et tempêtes; Picard, Paul (préf. de Martine Aubry); Publication : Syros, 1995; ISBN 2-84146-205-6
- 1995 : Petit dictionnaire pour lutter contre l'extrême droite; Aubry, Martine; Duhamel, Olivier; Publication : Éd. du Seuil, 1995; ISBN 2-02-028127-9
- 1996 : Pauvretés; sous la dir. de Claire Brisset, préf. de Martine Aubry; Publication : Hachette, 1996; ISBN 2-01-235180-8
- 1997 : Il est grand temps; Aubry, Martine; Publication : A. Michel, 1997; ISBN 2-226-09228-5
- 1997 : La nouvelle Grande-Bretagne : vers une société de partenaires; Tony Blair (préf. de Martine Aubry); Publication : La Tour-d'Aigues : Éd. de l'Aube, 1997; ISBN 2-87678-310-X
- 1997 : Martine Aubry : enquête sur une énigme politique; Burel, Paul; Tatu, Natacha; Publication : Calmann-Lévy, 1997; ISBN 2-7021-2792-4
- 1998 : Il est grand temps; Aubry, Martine; Publication : Librairie générale française, 1998; ISBN 2-253-14376-6
- 2002 : C'est quoi la solidarité ?; Aubry, Martine; Publication : A. Michel, 2000; ISBN 2-226-11018-6
- 2000 : Emploi et travail [Texte imprimé] : regards croisés; Olivier Bertrand, Denis Clerc, Yves Clot... [et al.]; sous la dir. de Jean Gadrey (préf. par Martine Aubry); Publication : Montréal (Québec) : l'Harmattan, 2000; ISBN 2-7384-9096-4
- 2002 : La Ville à mille temps; Sous la direction de Jean-Yves Boulin (préface de Martine Aubry); ISBN 2-87678-694-X
- 2002 : Notre-Dame de la Treille, du rêve à la réalité; Frédéric Vienne (préface de Martine Aubry); ISBN 2-912215-08-0
- 2003 : L'important, c'est la santé; coordonné par Martine Aubry; Publication : La Tour d'Aigues : Éd. de l'Aube, 2003; ISBN 2-87678-944-2
- 2004 : Démocratie participative : Promesses et ambiguïté; Michel Falise (préface de Martine Aubry); Publication : Aube (5 février 2004); ISBN 2-87678-916-7
- 2004 : Notre Sébasto...pol : Mémoire d'un Théâtre 1903-2003; Edgar Duvivier (préface de Martine Aubry); Publication Publi-Nord (1 mars 2004); ISBN 2-902970-56-0
- 2004 : Culture toujours : et plus que jamais !; coordonné par Martine Aubry; Publication : La Tour-d'Aigues : Éd. de l'Aube, 2004; ISBN 2-87678-990-6
- 2004 : Réduire les fractures nord/sud : Une utopie ?; sous la direction de Martine Aubry; Publication : L'Aube (20 août 2004); ISBN 2-7526-0017-8
- 2004 : Muscler sa conscience du bonheur en trente jours; Martine Aubry; Publications : Holoconcept (1 septembre 2004); ISBN 2-913281-39-7
- 2004 : Quel projet pour la gauche ?; Martine Aubry; Publication : L'Aube (19 novembre 2004); ISBN 2-7526-0056-9
- 2004 : Une vision pour espérer, une volonté pour transformer; Martine Aubry; Publication : La Tour-d'Aigues : Éd. de l'Aube, 2004; ISBN 2-7526-0031-3
- 2005 : Un nouvel art de ville : Le projet urbain de Lille; Pierre Saintignon (préface de Martine Aubry); Publication : Editions Ville de Lille (janvier 1, 2005); ISBN 2-9523506-0-4
- 2005 : Le Maître au Feuillage brodé : Primitifs flamands. Secrets d'ateliers Florence Combert, Didier Martens (préface de Martine Aubry); Publication : RMN (26 mai 2005); ISBN 2-7118-4891-4
- 2005 : Felice Beato en Chine : Photographier la guerre en 1860; Annie-Laure Wanaverbecq (préface de Martine Aubry); Publication : Somogy (22 septembre 2005); ISBN 2-85056-895-3
- 2006 : Agir contre les discriminations; Martine Aubry; Publication : L'Aube (9 mars 2006); ISBN 2-7526-0223-5
- 2008 : "Et si on se retrouvait..."; Martine Aubry, Stéphane Paoli, et Jean Viard; Publication : L'Aube (21 août 2008); ISBN 2-7526-0497-1

Political offices
Preceded by Jean-Pierre Soisson	Minister of Labour, Employment and Vocational Training; 1991–1993	Succeeded by Michel Giraud
Preceded by Jean-Claude Gaudin	Minister of Social Affairs; 1997–2000	Succeeded by Élisabeth Guigou
Preceded by Pierre Mauroy	Mayor of Lille; 2001–present	Incumbent
Party political offices
Preceded by François Hollande	First Secretary of the Socialist Party; 2008–2012	Succeeded by Harlem Désir
