= Helinand of Laon =

Bishop of Laon, France from 1052 to 1098

Helinand (or Elinand) was the bishop of Laon from 1052 to 1098.

Guibert of Nogent provides a short biography of Helinand in book III, chapter 2 of his autobiographical Monodies. According to Guibert, he came from a poor and undistinguished family from the Vexin. He had little education. Through the intercession of Count Walter III of Vexin, he became a chaplain to Walter's uncle, King Edward the Confessor of England. He was often sent on missions to King Henry I of France because of his knowledge of French ways. In England, he acquired great wealth, with which he bribed King Henry to make him bishop of Laon. He was ordained bishop on 14 June 1052. In June 1053, he was present when the body of Denis of Paris was put temporarily on public display in the Abbey of Saint-Denis.

Around 1054–1056, Helinand undertook a pilgrimage to Jerusalem. This is known from the Vita of Bishop Lietbert of Cambrai, who met the returning Helinand at Laodicea while on his own pilgrimage. Helinand warned him of the hardship of the remaining journey and Lietbert opted to turn back. The two bishops returned to France together. Margarita Torres Sevilla and José Miguel Ortega suggest that Helinand may have brought back the relic of the Holy Chalice, which they identify with the Chalice of Doña Urraca.

Following the death of Archbishop Gervais I in 1067, Helinand offered to purchase the vacant archdiocese of Reims from King Philip I. He was opposed by Manasses I and the two candidates took their case to Rome, where the Archdeacon Hildebrand (future Pope Gregory VII) judged in the latter's favour. According to Guibert, when questioned about his simony, he responded that he would purchase the papacy if it were available.

In 1078, during the Investiture Controversy, Helinand, with Bishops Theobald of Soissons and Ivo of Senlis, consecrated one Ralph, who had been invested by the king, as bishop of Amiens in contravention of canon law.

Helinand seems to have maintained his contacts with England after Edward's death. Ranulf Flambard, chancellor of William I of England, sent his sons to be educated by William de Corbeil in the bishop's house in Laon, according to De miraculis sanctae Mariae Laudunensis.

In 1096, Helinand assisted at the enthronement of Archbishop Manasses II of Reims. Despite his criticism of his character, Guibert praises Helinand for defending his diocese's rights and expending his fortune on its churches. Helinand died on 18 January 1098. The necrology of the cathedral of Laon lists his many gifts to the church. These included some lavishly bound gospel books.
