= Manasses of Reims =

Manasses of Reims may refer to:

- Manasses I (archbishop of Reims) (deposed 1080)
- Manasses II (archbishop of Reims) (died 1106)
