= De miraculis sanctae Mariae Laudunensis =

Latin work written in the 1140s

De miraculis sanctae Mariae Laudunensis, generally ascribed to Herman of Tournai, is a Latin work written in the 1140s which describes two fundraising tours of northern France and southern England made by the canons of Laon Cathedral in 1112 and 1113, and presents a eulogy of Laon's bishop, Barthélemy de Jur. Its incidental mentions of Cornish folklore about King Arthur, including belief in his survival, have attracted great interest from Arthurian scholars, but it is also a valuable historical source on the state of English and French society in the early 12th century.

== Date, authorship and sources ==
De miraculis sanctae Mariae Laudunensis was written by a monk who gives his name in the text as Herman. This author, often referred to as Herman of Laon, has increasingly been identified with the Herman of Tournai, abbot of Tournai, who wrote Restauratio sancti Martini Tornacensis (The Restoration of the Monastery of St Martin of Tournai). Herman first drafted the De miraculis at some point between 1136 and 1142, but added to his work in 1143–1144 and again in 1146–1147. The first two books are closely based on two eye-witness accounts, with some additions by the author; his other written sources include biographies, documents, and the Bible, from which last he quotes frequently.

== Contents ==
De miraculis is divided into three books. The first book begins with an account of the history of Laon Cathedral, including its destruction by fire in 1112, and of its bishop, Barthélemy de Jur. It then describes in detail an attempt to restore the church's finances by touring its sacred relics through northern France in the summer of the same year, mentioning also the miracles with which this journey was attended. The second book relates another fundraising journey through northern France and southern England in the spring and summer of 1113 made by nine canons of Laon, the 1112 alms having largely been spent. The third book describes the dedication of the rebuilt church in 1114 and praises bishop Barthélemy's efforts for the furtherance of the Church's work in this matter and in the diocese at large, especially his founding of monasteries.

== The English journey ==
Book 2, detailing the canons' journey to and around southern England, is a document of the greatest interest to historians. Herman tells us that they left Laon on the Monday before Palm Sunday and journeyed to Nesle, Arras and Saint-Omer, at each of which stops their relics worked miracles. On 25 April, at Wissant, they took ship for England. Their voyage, short as it was, saw them being pursued by a pirate vessel which was dismasted by heavenly intervention. They landed at Dover and proceeded to Canterbury, where they were welcomed by its future archbishop, William de Corbeil. From there they went on, doubtless taking the Pilgrims' Way, to Winchester, where they effected two cures. At the next stop, Christchurch in Dorset, the local churchmen received them churlishly, but as the canons left much of the town was burned down by a dragon. The canons then went on to Exeter, before doubling back to Salisbury where they cured another resident. Here they were welcomed by bishop Roger and his nephews Alexander and Nigel, who were ex-pupils of the Laon cathedral school, like several of the clerics they encountered on their journey. Pushing on westward they visited Wilton, avoided Exeter, and reached Bodmin in Cornwall, where there was an altercation with the inhabitants. They then turned back eastward and paid a highly profitable visit to Barnstaple and a more troubled one to Totnes, where they were treated as magicians. Worse, one man there tried to rob them by surreptitiously taking off some of the offerings in his mouth while pretending to kiss the shrine. He died soon after, and the canons recovered the money. They went on to Bristol, then Bath, and there saved the life of a half-drowned boy. Here the account of the canons' journey comes to an end, but we know they returned safely to Laon on 6 September with 120 marks in money as well as tapestries and ornaments.

== Arthurian significance ==
Much scholarly attention has been paid to two passages in the second book of De Miraculis which relate to the legend of King Arthur. The first deals with the canons' journey from Exeter to Bodmin, during which they were shown two places described as Arthur's Seat and Arthur's Oven, and were told that they were in terra Arturi, "Arthurian country" or "Arthur's land". Arthur's Seat is now often said to be unidentifiable, though various guesses have been proposed: Crockern Tor on Dartmoor, King Arthur's Hall on Bodmin Moor, and Warbstow Bury to the north of Bodmin Moor. Charles Henderson, followed by many other scholars, suggested that Arthur's Oven might be identical with King's Oven on Dartmoor. The locals' claim that this was Arthur's land is the first recorded instance of Cornwall, the West Country, or indeed any region, claiming King Arthur for itself.

The second passage deals with an incident that took place in Bodmin. One local inhabitant asserted that Arthur was not dead, "in just the same way", comments Herman, "as the Bretons are in the habit of arguing against the French on King Arthur's behalf". Someone in the Laon party made fun of this claim, tempers were inflamed, and a riot almost broke out. This passage is of the greatest value to Arthurian scholars, since it is widely considered to be the earliest evidence of the legend of Arthur's survival, as also of Breton interest in King Arthur, and of belief in Arthur being a matter of passionate concern to ordinary people. The precise importance of the passage depends in part on its dating. J. S. P. Tatlock, Roger Sherman Loomis, and many other critics have been in agreement that Herman took his account of the Bodmin incident from an eye-witness report by a member of the Laon mission, his main source for the whole of Book 2, but Christopher Michael Berard has recently argued that it was probably an interpolation by Herman himself, writing in the 1140s. Even Berard, however, accepts that there is no reason to doubt the authenticity of the first passage.

== Modern edition ==
- Hériman de Tournai (2008). Saint-Denis, Alain (ed.). Les miracles de Sainte Marie de Laon. Sources d'histoire médiévale, 36. Paris: CNRS. ISBN 9782271065674. Presents the original Latin text and a translation into French.

== Sources ==
- Antry, Theodore J.; Neel, Carol, eds. (2007). Norbert and Early Norbertine Spirituality. New York: Paulist Press. ISBN 9780809144686.
- Ashe, Geoffrey (1996). "Topography and local legends". In Lacy, Norris J. (ed.). The New Arthurian Encyclopedia. New York: Garland. pp. 455–458. ISBN 0815323034.
- Barlow, Frank (1972). The Feudal Kingdom of England, 1042–1216 (3rd ed.). London: Longman. ISBN 0582482372.
- Berard, Christopher Michael (Fall 2016). "King Arthur and the canons of Laon". Arthuriana. 26 (3): 91–119. doi:10.1353/art.2016.0039. JSTOR 26443645. S2CID 164685408.
- Breeze, Andrew (2011). "Arthur in early saints' lives". In Echard, Siân (ed.). The Arthur of Medieval Latin Literature: The Development and Dissemination of the Arthurian Legend in Medieval Latin. Arthurian Literature in the Middle Ages, VI. Cardiff: University of Wales Press. pp. 26–41. ISBN 9781783168569.
- Green, Thomas (2009). Arthuriana: Early Arthurian Tradition and the Origins of the Legend. Louth: Lindes Press. p. 80. ISBN 9781445221106.
- Henderson, Charles (1963) [1935]. Rowse, A. L.; Henderson, M. I. (eds.). Essays in Cornish History. Truro: D. Bradford Barton.
- Higham, N. J. (2002). King Arthur: Myth-Making and History. London: Routledge. ISBN 0415213053.
- Padel, O. J. (Summer 1994). "The Nature of Arthur". Cambrian Medieval Celtic Studies. 27: 1–31.
- Tatlock, J. S. P. (October 1933). "The English journey of the Laon canons". Speculum. 8 (4): 454–465. doi:10.2307/2855887. JSTOR 2855887. S2CID 162927262.
