= Christchurch Dragon =

Legend

The Christchurch Dragon is a legend associated with the town of Christchurch, Dorset, on the south coast of England. The legend has its origin in a mid-12th century Latin work written by Hermann de Tournai, which tells how a party of canons from the cathedral of Notre-Dame in Laon, France, witnessed a five-headed dragon destroy the church and much of the town. Although well-documented, the legend is little-known in the town of its origin.

== Legend synopsis ==
In Hermann de Tournai's account, a party of nine canons on a fund-raising tour from Laon Cathedral arrive at the town of Christchurch during a torrential rainstorm. They seek shelter at the local minster church but are rejected by the dean, who claims that the doors of the newly built church are not yet secure. In truth, the dean is concerned that their shrine and holy relics of the Virgin Mary would collect more offerings than his own altars.

Being the Saturday after Pentecost, the canons have arrived on the eve of the town's annual fair, so all the inns and lodging houses are full with merchants. However, one group of merchants kindly vacate their rooms in a newly built lodging house. The merchants then attend mass held at the house by the canons and agree to shun the church.

That night the canons tend to a poor herdsman's daughter who had been born with a deformed foot. The girl spends the night in prayer before the canons’ portable altar and the following morning her foot is found to be miraculously healed.

Later that morning the merchants all go to the fair. The canons depart from the town, but before they have travelled very far they are overtaken by two horsemen who tell them that the town is being set ablaze by a terrible dragon that had flown in from the sea. Eager to see this incredible spectacle, the canons race back to Christchurch.

The dragon is seen to be incredibly long and have five heads from which it breathes sulphurous flames. It is setting houses alight one by one, but the canons are astonished to find that the lodging house and herdsman's shelter are both completely unscathed and their occupants are safe inside. The kindly merchants have also all escaped unharmed, having departed from the fair early, before the dragon had appeared. However, the church where the canons had been denied shelter has been entirely destroyed.

The uncharitable dean is seen trying to save all his most valuable possessions by loading them on board a boat on the nearby river, but the dragon then swoops down and reduces the boat and everything on board to ashes. The repentant dean subsequently prostrates himself before the canon's shrine and prays to be forgiven for all the wrong he had done.

== History ==
The background story to the canons’ visit is described in Monodies (Book 3), a contemporary document written by Guibert de Nogent. This mentions the fund-raising journeys undertaken by the canons of Laon after the cathedral of Notre-Dame was badly damaged by fire during a civil uprising at Easter in 1112. In Chapter XIII Guibert refers to the burning of an unnamed English town visited by the canons, but he ascribes this to lightning heaven-sent as a punishment for the ungodly behaviour of the inhabitants and makes no mention of a dragon.

In the mid-12th century, Herman de Laon, otherwise Hermann de Tournai, a retired Flemish Abbot, elaborated on the canons’ English journey in De Miraculis Sanctae Mariae Laudunensis (Of the Miracles of St Mary of Laon). Two short chapters describe the events that took place in "a town called Christikerca", though Hermann replaces Guibert de Nogent's lightning with a five-headed dragon. Hermann's account was reproduced in the Patrologia Latina (Vol 156, Col 979–982) published by Jacques-Paul Migne in the 19th century.

In the early 13th century the story was retold in rhyming couplets by Prior Gautier de Coincy, a French poet-composer. An illustrated manuscript of this work, Miracles de Notre-Dame et Autres Poésies de Gautier de Coinci, which features depictions of the dragon flying over the town and river (Folio 210v), is held in the Bibliothèque nationale de France.

In the early 14th century the story appeared in the Nikolaus Saga written by Bergr Sokkason, an Icelandic monk and scholar. He probably had access to earlier Latin and Icelandic versions of the story. It was subsequently reproduced in other Icelandic sagas.

Some key details of Hermann de Tournai's account are confirmed by the Christchurch Priory cartulary, the bulk of which was compiled by 1372. It records that the Holy Trinity minster church was undergoing major reconstruction instigated in about 1094 by Ranulf Flambard. It also confirms that an annual fair was held a week after Pentecost on the feast day of the church, which only later became known as Trinity Sunday. It indicates that the dean in 1113 was the self-serving Peter de Oglander, who "imbued with evil intent, took away for himself all things set aside by ancient custom for the work of the church". However, the cartulary makes no mention of the church being badly damaged during construction.

== Modern era ==
In 1933 J. S. P. Tatlock, a specialist on medieval literature at the University of California, examined Hermann de Tournai's text and asserted that he could find nothing that contradicted the presumed date of 1113 for the canons’ journey.

In 1985 much of Hermann de Tournai's account was translated by English folklorist Jeremy Harte. This is thought to be the earliest translation of Hermann de Tournai's text into English.

A more recent translation (in French) of Hermann de Tournai's account appears in Les Miracles de Sainte Marie de Laon by Alain Saint-Denis (2008). Saint-Denis calculates the date of the dragon's appearance to be Sunday 1 June 1113.

In May 2013 the 900th anniversary of the dragon's appearance in Christchurch was commemorated by a locally organised Christchurch Dragon Festival with contributions by local schools, the Christchurch Chamber of Trade & Commerce, Christchurch Library, and the Red House Museum. On 1 June 2013, the five-headed dragon was mentioned in Search for Christchurch, a poem especially written by performance poet Elvis McGonagall and read by him at the official reopening of the newly refurbished Christchurch Library and Learning Centre.

== Explanation ==
There is no accepted explanation for the Christchurch Dragon. However, the references to an abnormally violent rainstorm accompanied by lightning bears a resemblance to the Great Thunderstorm on Dartmoor in 1638. This has led to the speculation, supported by Christopher Chatfield, deputy director of the Ball Lightning Research Division of TORRO (Tornado & Storm Research Organisation), that the canons of Laon may have witnessed a rare example of prolonged ball lightning.
