= Genebald =

Frankish bishop

Saint Genebald
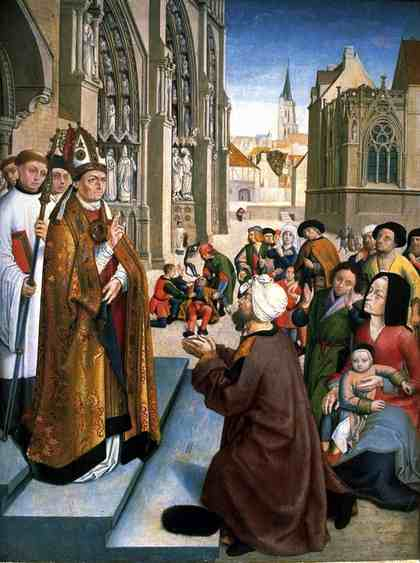
- Saint Remigius. Painting by Master of Saint Giles. It has been theorized that the 4 figures in the right foreground are Genebald, his wife, and the two children born while he was bishop of Laon.

Bishop
- Died: 550 AD
- Venerated in: Roman Catholic Church
- Feast: September 5

Saint Genebald (Genebaldus, Genebandus) (French: Génebaud, Génebaut, Guénebauld) (died 550 AD) was a Frankish bishop of Laon. He was a contemporary of Saint Remigius, bishop of Rheims, and according to The Golden Legend, was married to Remigius' niece.

== Legend ==
Because the diocese of Rheims was too large, Remigius had decided to create a separate diocese centered at Laon, and chose Genebald to be Laon’s first bishop. A married clerk, Genebald left his wife to become bishop around 499 AD. However, according to Canon Flodoard’s 10th-century account, Flodoardi Historiae Remensis Ecclesiae, and repeated by The Golden Legend, Genebald, after he became bishop, slept with his wife, who became pregnant with a boy.

Genebald asked that his son be named Latro (“Thief”), “because he had engendered it by theft.” So that it would not appear that his wife had borne a child out of wedlock, Genebald had her visit him again. Again they slept together, and this time his wife became pregnant with a girl, whom they named Vulpecula (“she-fox”).

Confessing his sins to Remigius, Genebald offered to leave his diocese. However, Remigius comforted Genebald and received his confession, and gave Genebald penance. Remigius had him shut in a small cell near the church of St. Julian for seven years. Remigius fed Genebald on only bread and water during this time, and took over Genebald’s duties as bishop of Laon.

According to The Golden Legend, an angel came to Genebald after the end of the seven-year term and gave Genebald permission to leave the cell. Genebald could not open the door as it had been sealed from the outside; however, according to the Legend, the angel opened the door after declaring: “Know thou that the door of heaven is opened to thee; I shall open this door without breaking of the seal which Saint Remigius hath sealed.” However, Genebald still wanted Remigius’ permission to leave the cell. The angel brought Remigius to him, and the bishop of Rheims reinstated Genebald as bishop of Laon.

According to Christian Cochini, “this legendary narrative probably has a kernel of truth.”

Reinstated as bishop, Genebald is said to have remained chaste for the rest of his life. After his death, his son Latro succeeded him as bishop of Laon. Latro was also venerated as a saint.
