= Foigny Abbey =

Abbey in Aisne, France

Coordinates: 49°53′31″N 3°58′26″E

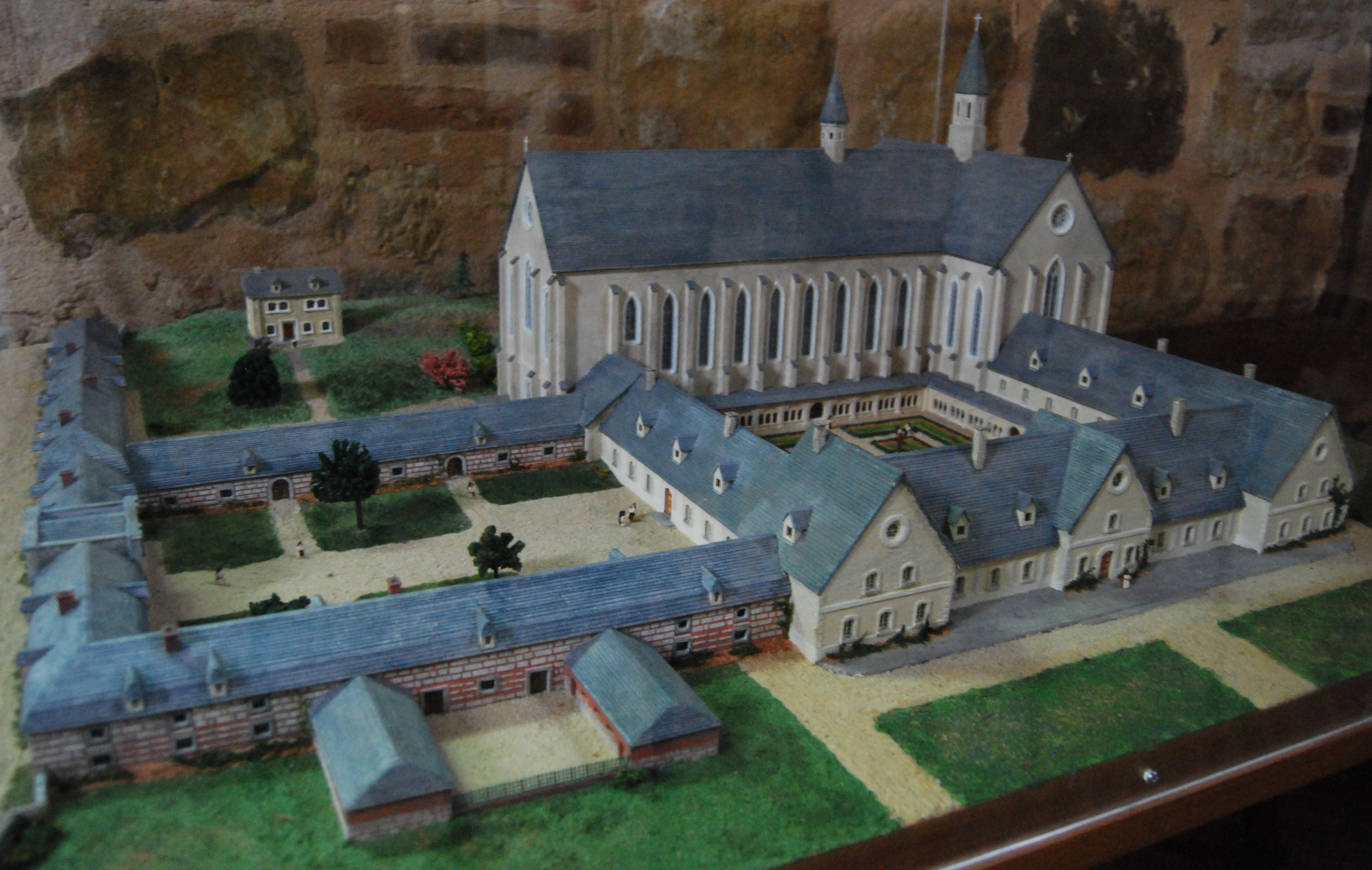

Foigny Abbey (French: Abbaye de Foigny) was a Cistercian monastery located in La Bouteille, in a valley in the Thiérache, in the north-eastern region of the Aisne department. It was founded on 11 July 1121 by Bernard of Clairvaux and Barthélemy of Jur, bishop of Laon. The church floor plan is based on that of the church of Clairvaux Abbey, as was confirmed by excavations in 1959.

The abbey prospered and at its height had no less than 100 monks and 200 lay brothers farming 12,000 hectares owned by the abbey, reaching as far as the gates of Laon. The abbey significantly contributed to the economic growth of the Thiérache region. The deforestation carried out together with other abbeys enabled the conversion of forest land to agriculture and the establishment of new settlements around the farms owned by the abbeys. Later, a large number of mills were established thanks to generous donations from the local nobility and the clergy.

The abbey was destroyed by fire in 1542. Major works on the site began in 1722 and in 1736 work began on the reconstruction of the conventual buildings, but had to stop because of lack of funds. In the French Revolution the abbey was suppressed and pillaged: there were only 11 monks by this time. In 1794 the abbey buildings were used as a military hospital. At the end of the 19th century, a chapel was built in the choir of the former abbey church. The site also includes a mill whose oldest part dates to the 12th century, which was still in operation until 2000 and which since 1982 has used the River Thon to produce hydroelectric power.
