= Vauclair Abbey =

Abbey in Aisne, France

Coordinates: 49.4525°N 3.74611°E

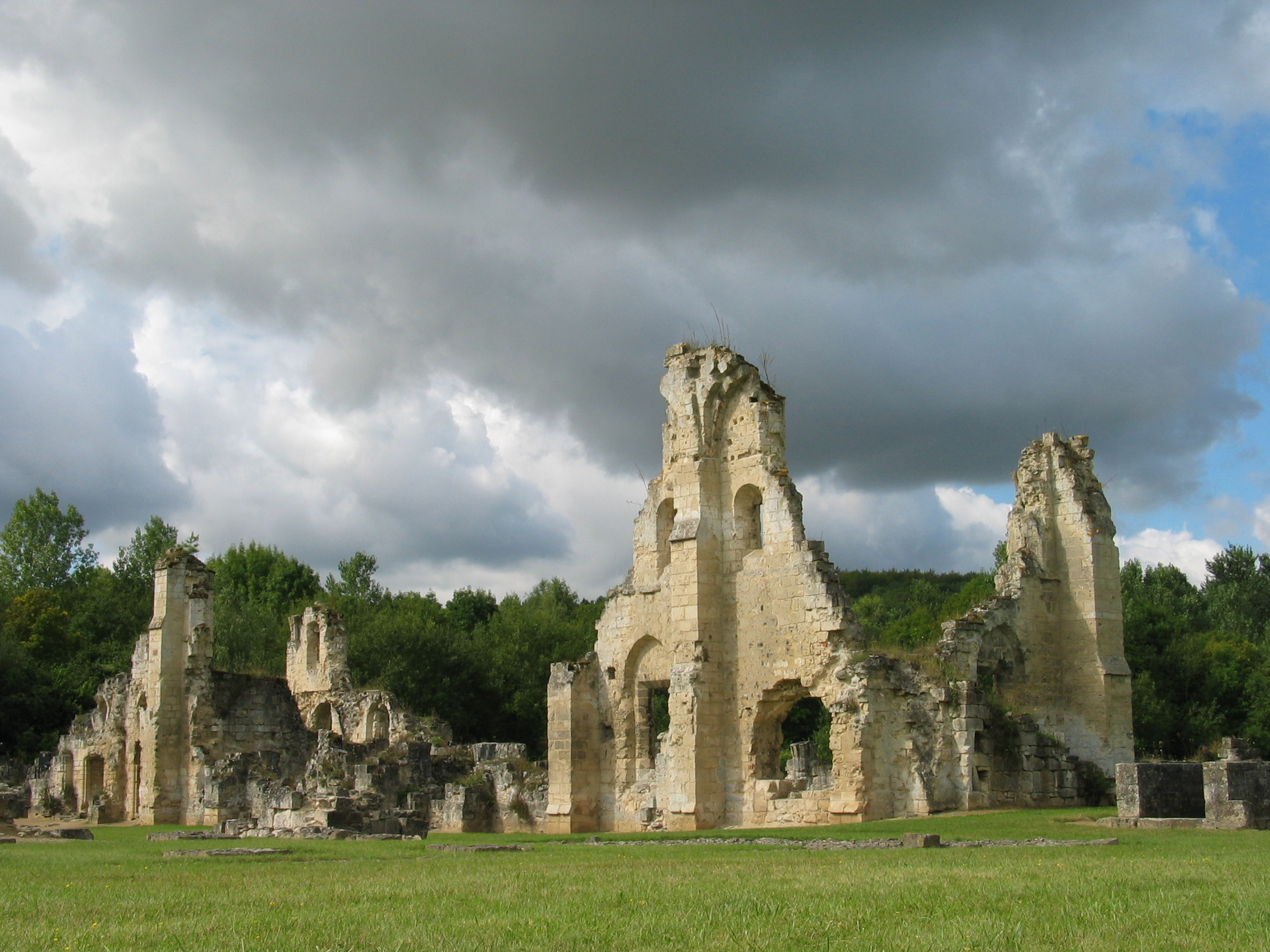
Ruins of Vauclair Abbey in 2005

Vauclair Abbey otherwise Vauclerc Abbey (French: Abbaye de Vauclair, Abbaye Notre-Dame de Vauclair) was a Cistercian monastery founded in 1134 by Saint Bernard of Clairvaux at the request of Barthélemy de Jur, bishop of Laon. It was located in what is now the commune of Bouconville-Vauclair, department of Aisne, France.

== History ==
The monastery was built about 15 kilometers to the south of Laon in an east-west stretch of the Ailette river valley at the foot of the northern side of the Chemin des Dames, on a site already occupied by a church, in the present commune of Bouconville-Vauclair. The site was ceded to Bernard with all its rights and dependencies. On 23 May 1134 a group of monks from Clairvaux Abbey, headed by the Englishman Henry Murdac, its first abbot, took possession of the new abbey, the 15th daughter house of Clairvaux. Its favourable east-west orientation led Bernard to name it Vauclair (Vallis clara), reversing the name of the mother abbey (Clara vallis). Supported by gifts from rich families, the abbey quickly prospered and was given several estates and farms.

In 1142, on the initiative of Bernard and of Hatto, bishop of Troyes, Le Reclus Abbey north of Sézanne was made subsidiary to Vauclair. In 1167, at the request of Henry I of Champagne, count palatine of Champagne, Vauclair Abbey sent monks to found La Charmoye Abbey not far from Épernay. The Hundred Years' War and the 16th-century French Wars of Religion heavily damaged Vauclair, though it managed to survive until the French Revolution in 1789, when it was finally demolished and sold as "national property". Its geographical location very near to the Chemin des Dames led to what was left of its buildings being almost totally destroyed in 1917 by direct artillery bombardment. Only ruins now remain.

Following excavations in 1966 by a local association led by a young Belgian Jesuit, Père René Courtois, who lived in the abbey from 1966 until his death in 2005, the site was made a monument historique in 1970. The site now also includes an arboretum of apple and pear trees and a medicinal herb garden planned by Courtois and opened in 1976.
