= King Arthur's messianic return =

Notion that King Arthur will one day return as a messiah

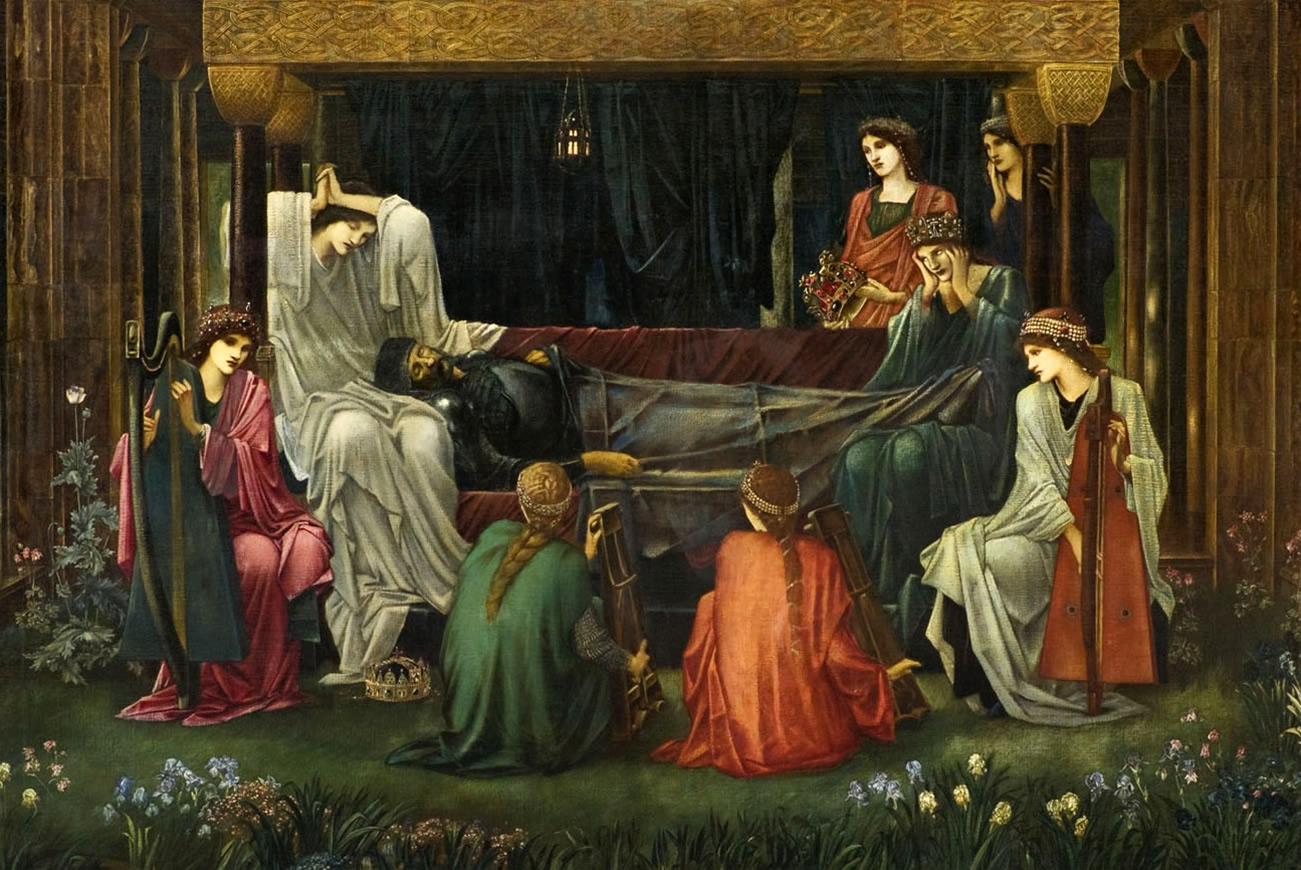
Detail of The Last Sleep of Arthur in Avalon (completed 1898), by Edward Burne-Jones. Shown in the center is Arthur lying on his deathbed.

King Arthur's messianic return is a mythological motif in the legend of King Arthur, which claims that he will one day return in the role of a messiah to save his people. It is an example of the king asleep in mountain motif. Few historical records of Arthur remain, and there are doubts that he ever existed, but he achieved a mythological status by the High Middle Ages that gave rise to a growing literature about his life and deeds.

== Origins ==
The possibility of Arthur's return is first mentioned by William of Malmesbury in 1125: "But Arthur's grave is nowhere seen, whence antiquity of fables still claims that he will return." In the "Miracles of St. Mary of Laon" (De miraculis sanctae Mariae Laudunensis), written by a French cleric and chronicler named Hériman of Tournai in c. 1145, but referring to events that occurred in 1113, mention is made of the Breton and Cornish belief that Arthur still lived. As Constance Bullock-Davies demonstrated, various non-Welsh sources indicate that this belief in Arthur's eventual messianic return was extremely widespread amongst the Britons from the 12th century onwards. How much earlier than this it existed is still debated. It did, in fact, remain a powerful aspect of the Arthurian legend through the medieval period and beyond. So John Lydgate in his Fall of Princes (1431–38) notes the belief that Arthur "shall resorte as lord and sovereyne Out of fayrye and regne in Breteyne" and Philip II of Spain apparently swore, at the time of his marriage to Mary I of England in 1554, that he would resign the kingdom if Arthur should return.

A number of locations were suggested for where Arthur would actually return from. The earliest-recorded suggestion was Avalon. In his 12th-century Historia Regum Britanniae, Geoffrey of Monmouth asserted that Arthur "was mortally wounded" at Camlann but was then carried "to the Isle of Avallon (insulam Auallonis) to be cured of his wounds", with the implication that he would at some point be cured and return therefrom made explicit in Geoffrey's later Vita Merlini. Another tradition held that Arthur was awaiting his return beneath some mountain or hill. First referenced by Gervase of Tilbury in his Otia Imperialia (c. 1211), this was maintained in British folklore into the 19th century and R.S. Loomis and others have taken it as a tale of Arthur's residence in an underground (as opposed to an overseas) Otherworld. Other less common concepts include the idea that Arthur was absent leading the Wild Hunt, or that he had been turned into a crow or raven.

== Influence ==
=== Medieval politics ===
The influence of Arthur's legend is not confined to novels, stories, and films; the legend of Arthur's messianic return has often been politically influential. On the one hand, it seems to have provided a means of rallying Welsh resistance to Anglo-Norman incursions in the 12th century and later. The Anglo-Norman text Description of England recounts of the Welsh that "openly they go about saying,... / that in the end, they will have it all; / by means of Arthur, they will have it back... / They will call it Britain again." It may be that such references as this reflect a Welsh belief that Arthur ought to be associated with the "Mab Darogan" ("Son of Prophecy"), a messianic figure of the Welsh prophetic tradition who would repel the enemies of the Welsh and who was often identified with heroes such as Cadwaladr, Owain Lawgoch and Owain Glyndŵr in Welsh prophetic verse. However, as Oliver Padel has noted, no example of a Welsh prophetic poetry telling of Arthur's return to expel the enemies of the Welsh from Britain has survived, which some have seen as troubling and a reason for caution: we must rely on non-Welsh texts (such as the above) for the notion that this was a widespread belief amongst the Welsh from the mid-12th century onwards, along with more debatable evidence such as Henry VII's attempts to associate himself with Arthur when taking the throne, discussed below.

On the other hand, the notion of Arthur's eventual return to rule a united Britain was adopted by the Plantagenet kings to justify their rule. Once King Arthur had been safely pronounced dead through the purported discovery of his grave and bones at Glastonbury Abbey which was then identified as Avalon, in an attempt to deflate Welsh dreams of a genuine Arthurian return, the Plantagenets were then able to make ever greater use of Arthur as a political cult to support their dynasty and its ambitions. So, Richard I used his status as the inheritor of Arthur's realm to shore up foreign alliances, giving a sword reputed to be Excalibur to Tancred of Sicily. Similarly, "Round Tables"—jousting and dancing in imitation of Arthur and his knights—occurred at least eight times in England between 1242 and 1345, including one held by Edward I in 1284 to celebrate his conquest of Wales and consequent "reunification" of Arthurian Britain. The Galfridian claim that Arthur conquered Scotland was also used by Edward I to provide legitimacy to his claims of English suzerainty over that region.

=== Post-medieval politics ===
The influence of King Arthur on the political machinations of England's kings was not confined to the medieval period: the Tudors also found it expedient to make use of Arthur. In 1485, Henry VII marched through Wales to take the English throne under the banner of the Arthurian Red Dragon, he commissioned genealogies to show his putative descent from Arthur, and named his first-born son Arthur. Later, in the reigns of Henry VIII and Elizabeth, Arthur's career was influential once again, now in providing evidence for supposed historical rights and territories in legal cases that pursued the crown's interests.

Whilst the potential for such political usage—wherein the reality of Geoffrey's Arthur and his wide-ranging conquests was accepted and proclaimed by English antiquarians and thus utilized by the crown—naturally declined after the attacks on Geoffrey's Historia by Polydore Vergil and others, Arthur has remained an occasionally politically potent figure through to the present era. In the 20th century, a comparison of John F. Kennedy and his White House with Arthur and Camelot, made by Kennedy's widow, helped consolidate Kennedy's posthumous reputation, with Kennedy even becoming associated with an Arthur-like messianic return in American folklore.

== Modern adaptations ==
This idea of Arthur's eventual return has proven attractive to a number of modern writers. John Masefield used the idea of Arthur sleeping under a hill as the central theme in his poem "Midsummer Night" (1928). C. S. Lewis was also inspired by this aspect of Arthur's legend in his novel That Hideous Strength (1945), in which King Arthur is said to be living in the land of Abhalljin on the planet Venus. Stephen R. Lawhead's novel Avalon: The Return of King Arthur (1999), a distant finale to his historical fantasy series The Pendragon Cycle, features a reincarnated Arthur named James Arthur Stuart who rises to restore the British monarchy as it is about to be abolished.

The return of King Arthur has been especially prominent in the comics medium with examples from at least the 1940s. One of the better-known uses of this motif is by Mike Barr and Brian Bolland, who has Arthur and his knights returning in the year 3000 to save the Earth from an alien invasion in the comic book series Camelot 3000 (1982–85). Other examples include Makoto Yukimura's Vinland Saga, a manga featuring the Viking invasion and rule of England, where the character Askeladd, a Norwegian-Welsh half-blood, recounts the tale of his ancestor King Artorius and his glorious return from Avalon to save Britannia. Ultimately he reveals his birth name is Lucius Artorius Castus and claims to be the true rightful king, fulfilling the legend from a certain point of view by saving Wales from Sweyn Forkbeard, and mentoring his son Canute.

The Disney Channel Original Movie Avalon High also imagined the return of King Arthur in its fictionalized narrative. The movie follows the story of a high school girl, Allie. As the daughter of two Medieval historians (with a focus on Arthurian legend), she begins school as a new student at Avalon High. There, she meets high school quarterback, Will, whose girlfriend Jennifer and best friend Lance appear to be having an affair behind his back. She befriends a boy named Myles, who experiences premonitions and is able to predict events in Allie’s life before they happen. As part of their studies of Camelot in history class, Allie and Myles are assigned research on an elusive legend called the “Order of the Bear.” Her parents reveal that it is a prophesy that King Arthur will be reincarnated in order to bring about a new age of enlightenment. The Order of the Bear also includes the reincarnation of Mordred, who intends to destroy the incarnate Arthur and send the world into another dark age. The film follows Allie and Myles’ attempts to uncover the truth of Arthur’s reincarnation and prevent the incarnate Mordred from exacting his malevolent plan.

== See also ==
- Bhagavad Gita
- Constantine XI Palaiologos
- Epic of King Gesar
- Muhammad al-Mahdi
- Nero Redivivus legend
- Ogier the Dane
- Rudra Chakrin
- Second Coming, identified in Islamic eschatology with the belief that Jesus entered Heaven alive
