= Latro of Laon =

Frankish bishop

Saint Latro
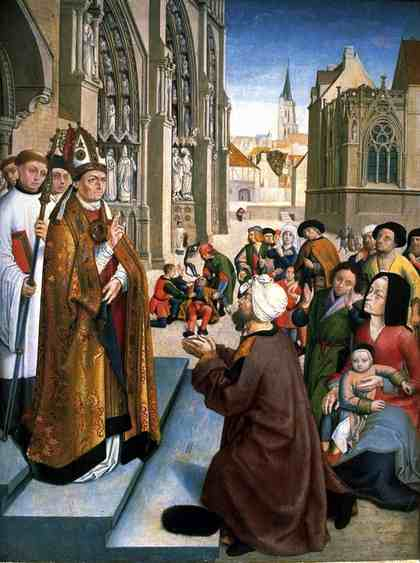
- Saint Remigius. Painting by Master of Saint Giles. It has been theorized that the 4 figures in the right foreground are Genebald, his wife, and their children Latro and Vulpecula.

Bishop
- Born: c. 499 AD; Laon, France
- Died: 570 AD
- Venerated in: Roman Catholic Church

Saint Latro (literally “Thief”; French: Latron, Larron; c. 499 AD—570 AD) was a Frankish bishop of Laon. He succeeded his father Saint Genebald as bishop of Laon. It is alleged that he was conceived while his father was a bishop.
