= Pardulus of Laon =

Pardulus of Laon (Note: Pardoul, Pardule de Laon, Pardulus Laudunensis.) was bishop of Laon from 847 to 857. He is known for his participation in the theological controversy of double predistination, where he sided with the orthodox position of archbishop Hincmar of Rheims against Gottschalk of Orbais. A letter of his to Hincmar is known.

Pardulus was a deacon of the cathedral of Reims before he became bishop. He was a bishop elect (episcopus vocatus) by April 847. Pardoul was also the abbot of Montier-en-Der Abbey, and the founder, together with queen Ermentrude, of Origny Abbey.

In the early 850s he was an ally of Robert the Strong and on good terms with the king, Charles the Bald, and the queen, Ermentrude.
