= Le Reclus Abbey =

Abbey in Marne, France

Coordinates: 48.837605°N 3.727561°E

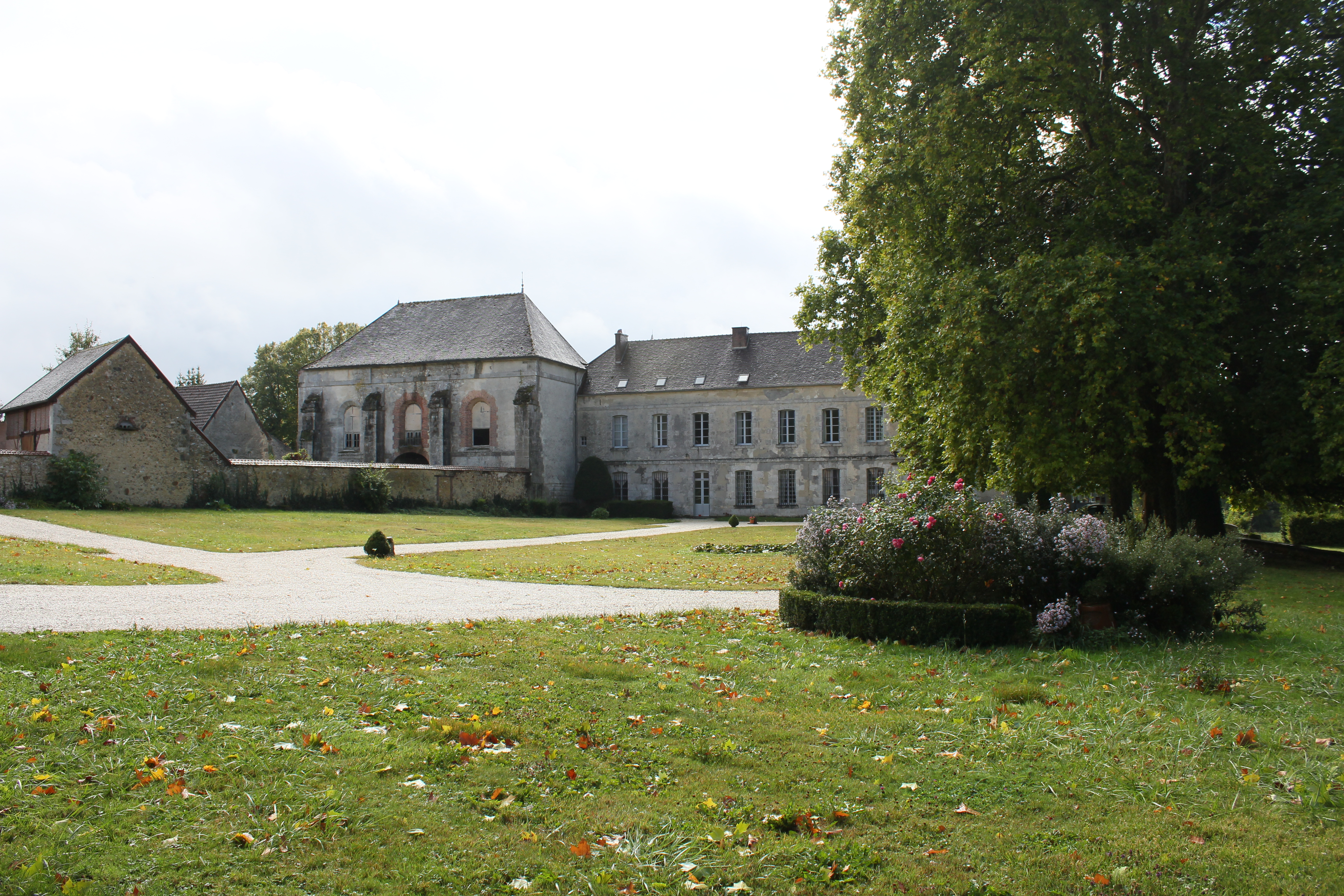
Surviving abbey buildings

Le Reclus Abbey (French: Abbaye Notre-Dame du Reclus; Abbatia Sanctae Mariae de Recluso) was a Cistercian monastery in the present Talus-Saint-Prix near Sézanne in the arrondissement of Épernay, Marne, France. It was in the diocese of Troyes.

The abbey was founded by Bernard of Clairvaux in c. 1142 around the hermitage of Blessed Hugh the Hermit (Hugues le Reclus, Hugo reclusus), from whom the abbey took its name. Hugh had at first retired from the world to an arid place in the parish of Saint-Prix known as Fons Balimi around 1128–1130, before being joined by a few companions. He was mentioned in 1176 in the cartulary of the Abbey of Saint-Pierre-d'Oyes (canton of Sézanne) in connection with the sale of a pond and of land to Le Reclus Abbey by Hugh, Count of Baye, who also confirmed his uncle Simon's gift of the rights of the forest of Talu to the abbey because of its extreme poverty. Hugh possibly died that same year; after his death the villagers kept his memory alive by burning a lamp on his grave. Probably also in that year Le Reclus became a daughter house of Vauclair Abbey.

Le Reclus was always a poor monastery, but nevertheless survived up to the French Revolution, when it was suppressed.

== Sources ==
- Bernard Peugniez, 2001: Routier cistercien. Abbayes et sites. France, Belgique, Luxembourg, Suisse, p. 132. Nouvelle édition augmentée. Éditions Gaud: MoisenayISBN 2840800446
