= Origny Abbey =

Abbey in Aisne, France

Coordinates: 49°50′15″N 3°29′23″E

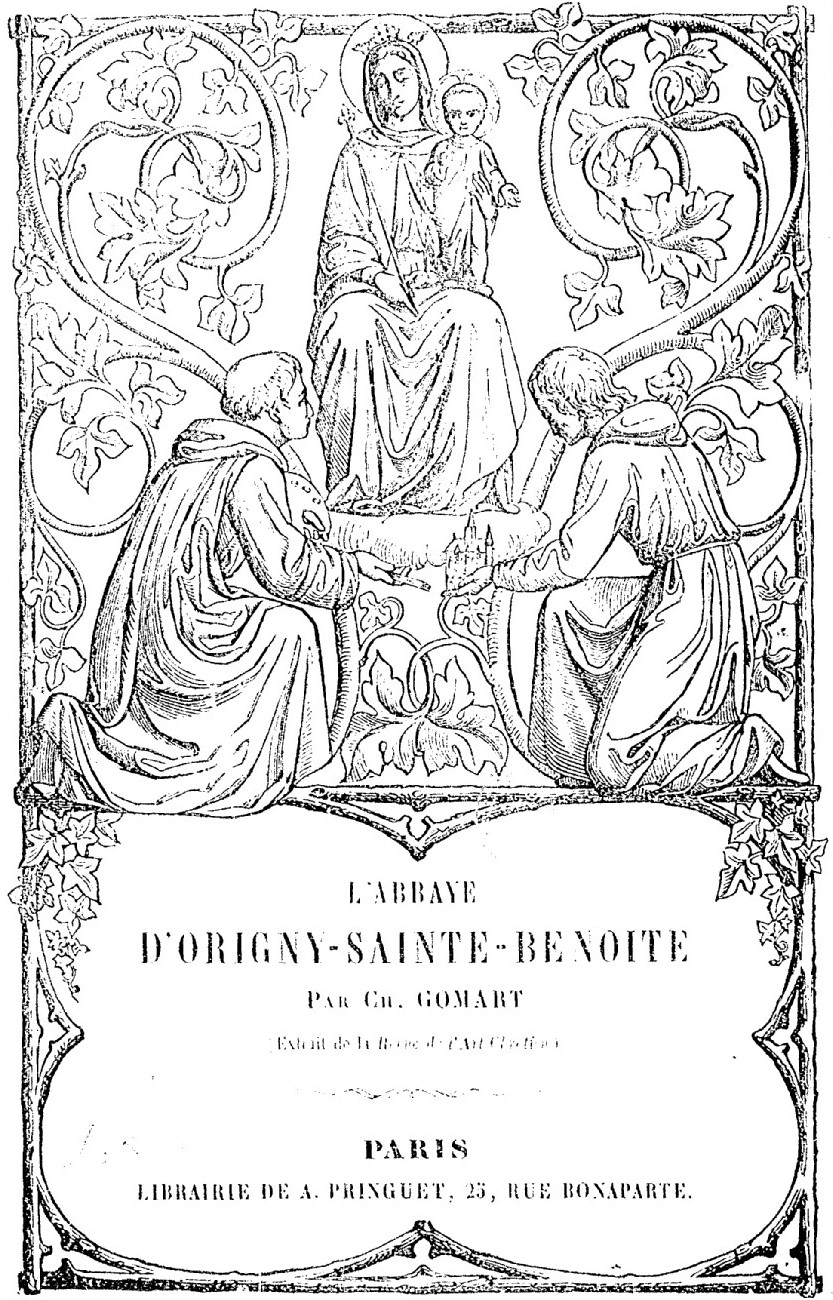

Origny Abbey (French: Abbaye d'Origny) was a Benedictine nunnery located in Origny-Sainte-Benoite, Aisne, France.

It was founded in around 854 by Bishop Pardulus of Laon and Ermentrude, the wife of Charles the Bald, on the site of the tomb of Saint Benoite, or Benedicta, who had been martyred in 362. The abbey owned extensive estates in the region and only accepted entrants from the nobility. The collegiate church of Saint Vaast was a dependency of it.

The buildings caught fire in 873, 943, 1339, 1358, 1480, 1552, 1557 and 1595.

The abbey was suppressed in 1792 during the French Revolution. The 40 nuns were dispersed and the buildings entirely demolished.
