= Origny-Sainte-Benoite =

- Commune
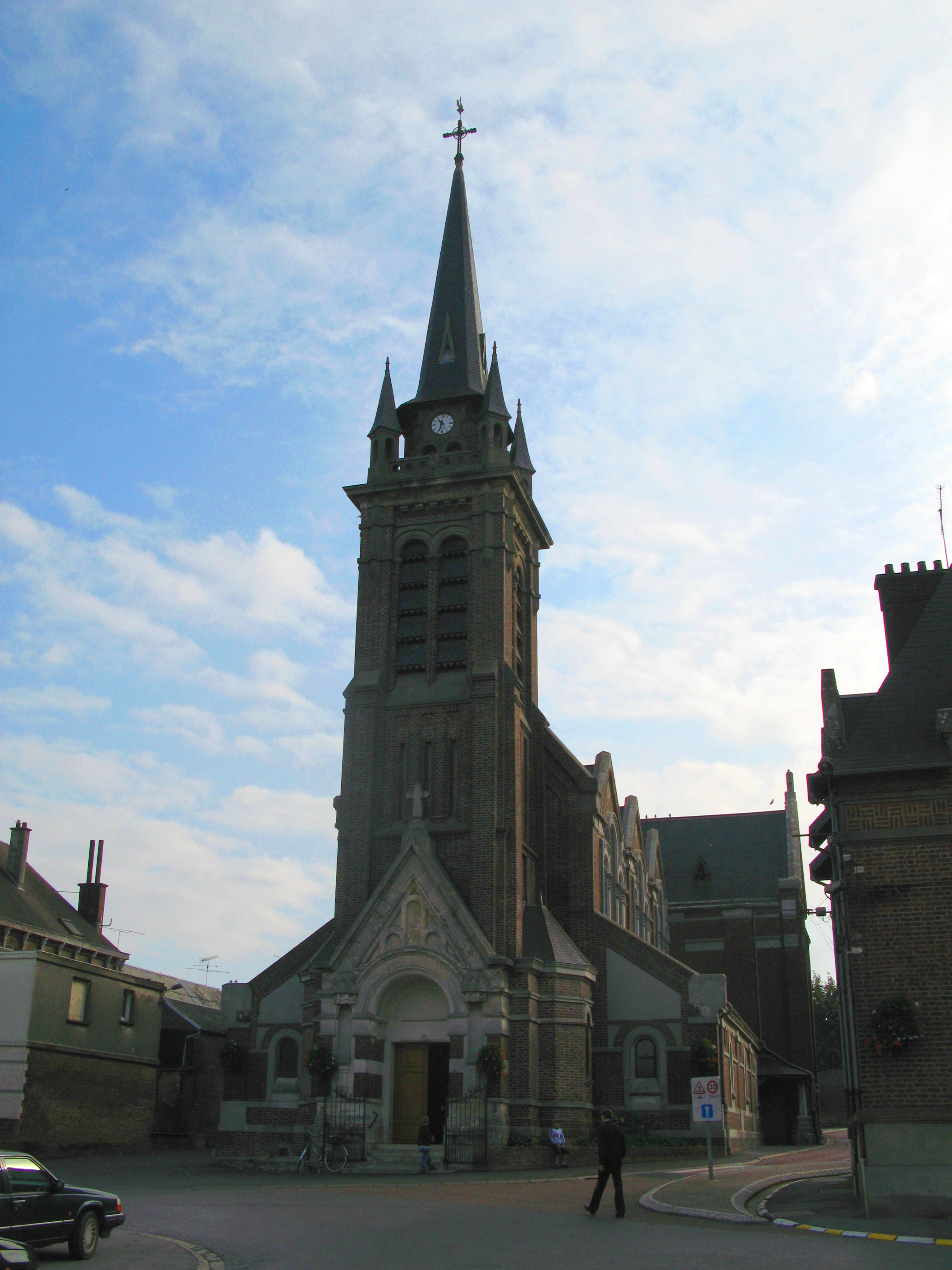
- The church of Origny-Sainte-Benoite

- Coat of arms
- Location of Origny-Sainte-Benoite
- Location within France Location within Hauts-de-France
- Coordinates: 49°50′15″N 3°29′23″E
- Country: France
- Region: Hauts-de-France
- Department: Aisne
- Arrondissement: Saint-Quentin
- Canton: Ribemont
- Intercommunality: Val de l'Oise

Government
  - Mayor (2026–32): Jacques Bleuse
- Area^{1}: 23.3 km^{2} (9.0 sq mi)
- Elevation: 75 m (246 ft)
- Highest elevation: 139 m (456 ft)
- Lowest elevation: 67 m (220 ft)
- Population (2023): 1,587
  - Density: 68.1/km^{2} (176/sq mi)
- Time zone: UTC+01:00 (CET)
  - Summer (DST): UTC+02:00 (CEST)
- INSEE/Postal code: 02575 /02390
- ^{1} French Land Register data, which excludes lakes, ponds, glaciers > 1 km^{2} (0.386 sq mi or 247 acres) and river estuaries.

Origny-Sainte-Benoite (French pronunciation: [ɔʁiɲi sɛ̃t bənwat]) is a commune in the Aisne department in Hauts-de-France in northern France.

The former Origny Abbey was located here.

== Population ==
Historical population
| Year | Pop. | ±% p.a. |
|---|---|---|
| 1968 | 2,341 | — |
| 1975 | 2,260 | −0.50% |
| 1982 | 2,145 | −0.74% |
| 1990 | 1,822 | −2.02% |
| 1999 | 1,769 | −0.33% |
| 2007 | 1,692 | −0.55% |
| 2012 | 1,706 | +0.16% |
| 2017 | 1,685 | −0.25% |
| 2023 | 1,587 | −0.99% |
Source: INSEE

== See also ==
- Communes of the Aisne department
