= Herman of Tournai =

Abbot of Saint Martin of Tournai

Herman of Tournai, Herman of Laon or Hériman of Tournai, (French Hériman, Latin Herimannus; 1095–1147), the third abbot of Saint Martin of Tournai, was a chronicler of his abbey and, in many anecdotal accounts connected with the abbey, a social historian of the world seen from its perspective. Forced from his abbacy in 1136 by a contingent within the monastic community that asserted he had been lax in his enforcement of the Benedictine rule, he had the leisure while at Rome to write his book, Restauratio sancti Martini Tornacensis, written in Latin about fifty years after a local plague of 1090. He was a pupil of Odoardus, later Bishop of Cambrai, whose example as a teacher he delineates at the start of his work, and who was the driving force behind the refounding of a neglected and undistinguished church dedicated to St Martin of Tours near Tournai. Herman's Restauratio has been edited and translated for the first time into English by Lynn Harry Nelson, who provided extended explanatory notes.

Following his expulsion from Tournai, Herman spent some time at Laon, where he joined the circle of Bishop Bartholomew de Jur. Bartholomew sent Herman into Spain to recover the body of Saint Vincent of Saragossa, which had been promised for Laon by Alfonso, king of Aragon, Bartholomew's kinsman. Though the relics were not forthcoming, Herman had the opportunity to copy some Spanish Marian works by Ildefonsus of Toledo to which he added an account of Bartholomew's building programme at Laon, and his own miracle book, De miraculis beatae Mariae Laudunensis, "of the miracles of Saint Mary of Laon". The work linked a revival in the spiritual life of Laon under its bishop Bartholomew to the particular local interventions of the Virgin Mary, whose relics were toured in central France and England to raise money for the rebuilding of Laon Cathedral, recently laid waste by fire. He wrote the account in the 1140s, pseudepigraphically, as if by a canon of the cathedral: in his address to Bartholomew he asserts, "I was reluctant to put my small name beneath them, so I have washed these miracles by a pretext under the name of the canons of the church."
