= Barthélemy de Jur =

French bishop

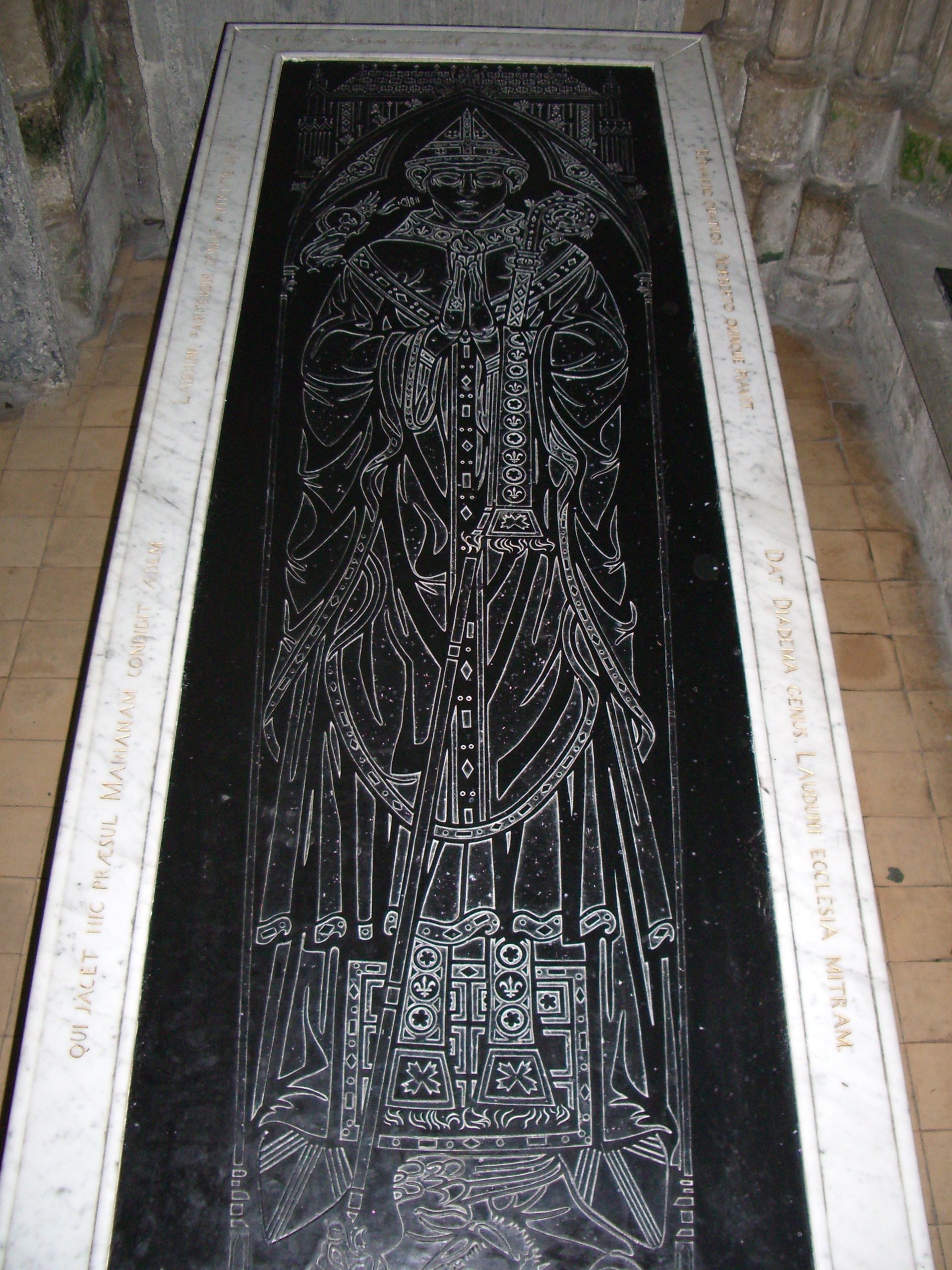
In Cathédrale Notre-Dame de Laon

Barthélemy de Jur (misread as de Vir in the 19th century; c.1080 - 1158) was a French bishop. He was bishop of Laon from 1113 to 1151. Some documents give his name as Barthélemy de Grandson or de Joux.

== Life ==
Barth was the son of Conon Falcon (Foulques) seigneur de Grandson, de La Sarraz, du Jura et de Lausanne, and of Aélis (Ade, Adélaïde), daughter of Hilduin, seigneur de Ramerupt et de Montdidier and his wife Adélaïde de Roucy. His father died when he was very young and it was at Neufchâtel that his uncle Ebles II, Count of Roucy, raised him.

Around 1095, he was entrusted to his maternal great-uncle Manassès II de Châtillon, archbishop of Reims. Manasses was a cousin of the reigning Pope Urban II. The archbishop took charge of the education of Barthélemy, which he entrusted to the cathedral canons. In 1102 he made Barthélemy treasurer of the cathedral chapter. As a member of the household of Archbishop Raoul le Vert, Barthélemy witnessed a number of charters. In 1106, through the influence of Adèle de Vermandois he was appointed treasurer of the chapter of Saint-Quentin.

=== Bishop ===
In 1113 Barthélemy was elected bishop of Laon with the support of Anselm, dean of the cathedral canons and was consecrated in the metropolitan city of Rheims on Easter Sunday in the presence of King Louis VI. He contributed his own money to the rebuilding of Laon Cathedral, which had suffered heavily in the commune's revolt in 1112. The church was reconstructed and consecrated in 1114. According to ancient documents, the first shrine of Notre-Dame de Liesse was built by Barthélemy, with the stones left over from the construction of Laon Cathedral.

He attended most of the councils of his time: Reims (1119), Beauvais (1120), Soissons (c.1080) He probably participated at the Council of Soissons in 1122. He was at that of Troyes (1128). Also in 1128, the Templars established a commandery in Laon with the support of the bishop and the agreement of Pope Honorius II.

At the Council of Reims in October 1119, Pope Calixtus II requested Norbert of Xanten to found a religious order in the Diocese of Laon in France. Bishop Barthélemy had given land at Prémontré in the Voas forest to the Abbey of St Vincent in Laon, but as the Benedictines had tried in vain to cultivate it, Barthélemy then obtained it for Norbert. Barthélemy and Norbert visited Prémontré about the middle of January and the bishop gave the white habit to Norbert on 25 January, the feast of the Conversion of Saint Paul. The following Christmas Day, Norbert established the Canons Regular of Prémontré.

In 1121 Barthélemy and his relative, Bernard of Clairvaux, founded Foigny Abbey. In 1134 they founded Vauclair Abbey in the Vauclair forest to the south of Laon. In 1136 he persuaded Bernard to found a women's monastery at Montreuil. With help from his brother Ebal (Eble), he also took part in the foundation of the Premonstratensian abbey at Lac de Joux, sometimes called the abbaye du Lac de Cuarnens.

In 1142 Barthélemy and his fellow bishops Pierre de Senlis and Simon de Noyon, probably misled by statements from Ralph I, Count of Vermandois, consented to bless the union between him and Petronilla of Aquitaine. Ralph had illegally repudiated his first marriage to Eleanor of Champagne, sister of Theobald II, Count of Champagne. Pope Innocent II found that Ralph's second marriage was invalid and excommunicated him, Petronilla and suspended the prelates who had blessed the marriage. Barthélemy was dismissed from his bishopric in 1151 and became an ordinary monk in Foigny Abbey, where he died in 1158.

Barthélemy was buried in the abbey church at Foigny; his bones were exhumed in 1793 to avoid profanation. They were possibly transferred to the church at Effry.

== Sources ==
- https://www.histoireaisne.fr/memoires_numerises/chapitres/tome_46/Tome_046_page_007.pdf
- Suzanne Martinet, Montloon, reflet fidèle de la montagne et des environs de Laon de 1100 à 1300, 1972
