= Manasses II (archbishop of Reims) =

Manasses II or Manasses of Châtillon (died 17 September 1106) was the Archbishop of Rheims (1096–1106), most significantly at the time of the First Crusade and the Crusade of 1101.

He was of the House of Châtillon, a son of Manasses, the vidame of Rheims. He studied at the cathedral school of the city. Manasses was first provost then treasurer of the cathedral. He was an associate of Bruno of Cologne, then Chancellor of the Archdiocese. Together, they opposed Archbishop Manasses de Gournay, who was later suspended from office when he failed to appear at a synod in Lyon convened in 1079 by papal legate Hugh of Die.

He was elected bishop in 1096 following the death of Renaud du Bellay. At the time he had yet to receive holy orders.

As archbishop, he opposed the independent-minded monks of the Abbey of Saint-Remi. According to Pope Urban II, he was "born...full of zeal". He died among the canons of Saint-Denis of Rheims and left behind many letters by which we learn much of his episcopate and the concurrent crusading movement in northern France.

== Sources ==
- Nouvelle Biographie Générale. Vol 33 Mal-Mar. Paris, 1859.

Preceded by Renaud du Bellay	Archbishop of Reims; 1096–1106	Succeeded by Gervais de Rethel
