= Renaud du Bellay =

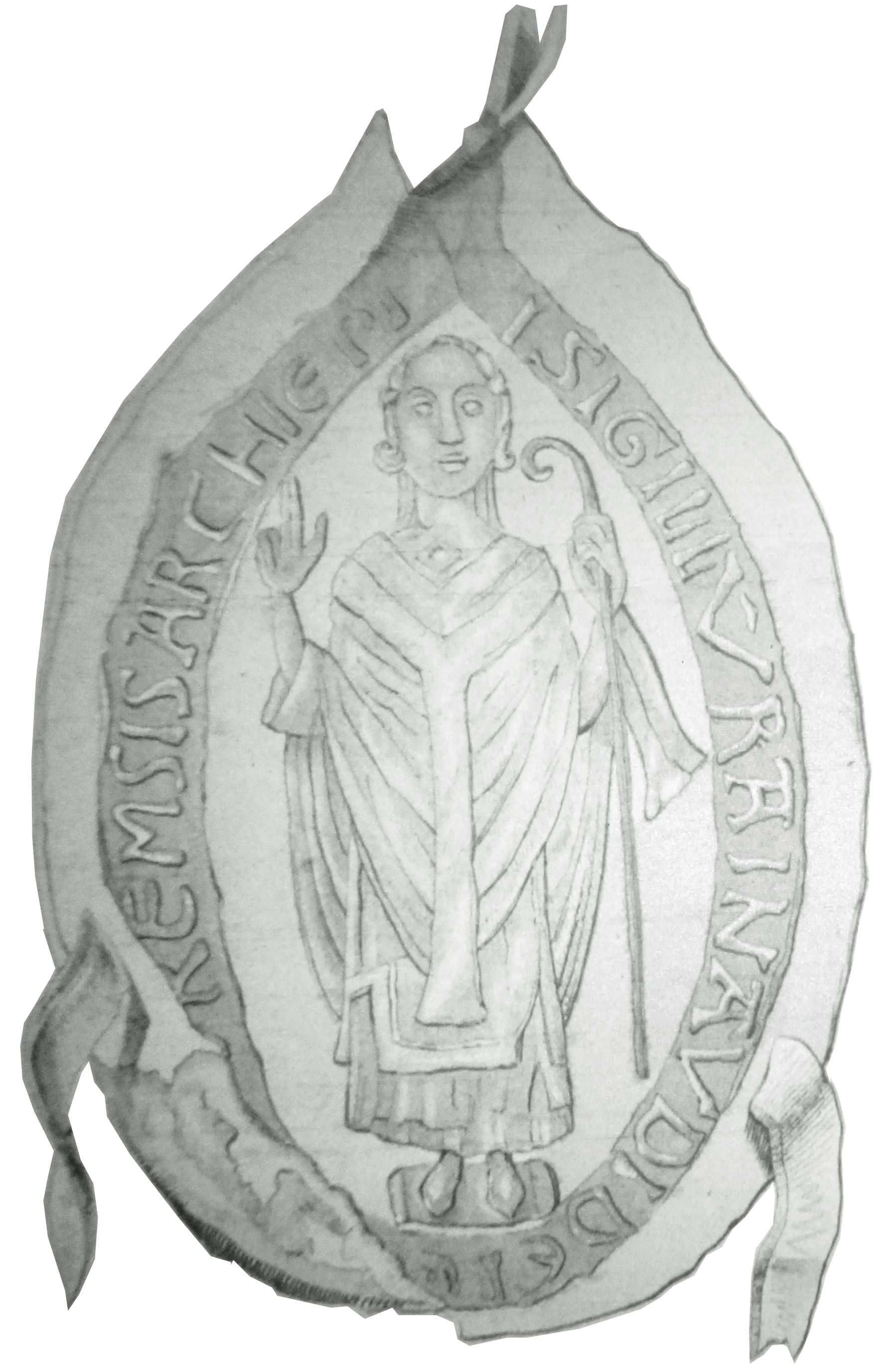
Seal

Renaud du Bellay (Latin: Raynaldus) was the treasurer of Tours Cathedral and Archbishop of Reims from AD 1083 to 1096. He succeeded Manasses I after a vacancy of around three years. He presided over the Council of Soissons in 1092–93 which declared Roscellin's nominalism heretical. The acts of the council have not survived but it is known from contemporary correspondence, as with Anselm, the archbishop of Canterbury.

== See also ==
- Catholic Church in France

Catholic Church titles
Preceded by Manasses I	Archbishop of Reims; 1083 – 1096	Succeeded by Gervaise of Rethel
