= Master of Saint Giles =

French painter

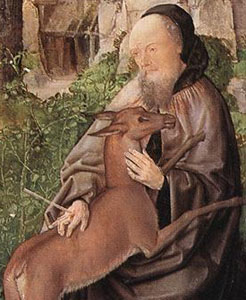
Saint Giles and the Hind, (detail) (National Gallery, London)

The Master of Saint Giles (French: Maître de Saint-Gilles) was a Franco-Flemish painter active, probably in Paris, about 1500, working in a delicate Late Gothic manner, with rendering of textures and light and faithful depictions of actual interiors that show his affinities with Netherlandish painting. It is not clear whether the Master of Saint Giles was a French painter who trained in the Low Countries (perhaps more likely), or a Netherlander who emigrated to France.

His pseudonym was given him by Max Friedländer, who reconstructed part of the anonymous painter's oeuvre, starting from two panels devoted to Saint Giles (a Miracle and a Mass) in the National Gallery, London, that were part of the lefthand shutter of an altarpiece, and two further panels now in Washington from the same altarpiece. The hand of an assistant can be discerned in the Baptism of Clovis at the National Gallery of Art, Washington, who also have a panel with Episodes from the Life of a Bishop-Saint - perhaps Saint Leu, Saint Denis or Saint Remy. All four panels have, or had, single grisaille figures of saints (Saints Peter, Giles, Denis and an unidentified bishop-saint) in niches, imitating sculpture, on the reverse. The Washington pair, which were in poor condition, have been separated and are lost, although photographs exist. Undoubtedly there were further panels, whose subjects cannot be guessed, as the combination of scenes is original.

== Settings of the altarpiece ==
The original location of the altarpiece has not yet been confirmed, although the choice of three scenes including Frankish Kings, and the very specific settings of scenes in the Abbey of Saint-Denis (Mass of Saint Giles, London), where the Kings of France were crowned, the royal Chapel of Sainte-Chapelle (Baptism of Clovis), and outside the cathedral of Notre Dame de Paris (Episodes), suggest a commission very close to the crown, perhaps the cover for the high altar at Saint-Denis. Another candidate is the church of St Leu-St-Gilles, on the Rue Saint-Denis in Paris.

The unidentified bishop-saint stands on the steps of the now vanished church of Saint-Jean-le-Rond, next door to Notre-Dame, the main entrance to which can be seen behind to the left. The small church was used as a baptistry. In the background is the Hôtel-Dieu. Both buildings survived until the eighteenth century, and are known from engravings. The panel with the King hunting probably shows a view of Pontoise, now in the north-western suburbs of Paris. The views shown appear very accurate where they can be confirmed by later pictures, or their survival to the present, and the view of Saint-Denis in particular is a valuable record of the church-furnishings of the day, all destroyed before or during the French Revolution.

== Other works ==
More specific Netherlandish connections include his adaptation of Madonna types developed by Rogier van der Weyden, evinced by the head of a lady at the Metropolitan Museum, and a Madonna and Child, probably early, in the Louvre. To him is attributed a portrait of Philip the Handsome (Winterthur), who visited Paris in 1501, that appears to be the original version of one of the most common portrait types of this prince. There are two saints in Bern which show a more massive French style. A Betrayal of Christ in Brussels is a night-scene, illuminated only by a lantern. Like the Estonian-born Michael Sittow and Jean Hey (the Master of Moulins), he may demonstrate the international spread of Netherlandish style, or like Juan de Flandes, the spread of Netherlandish painters.

== Gallery - the altarpiece panels ==
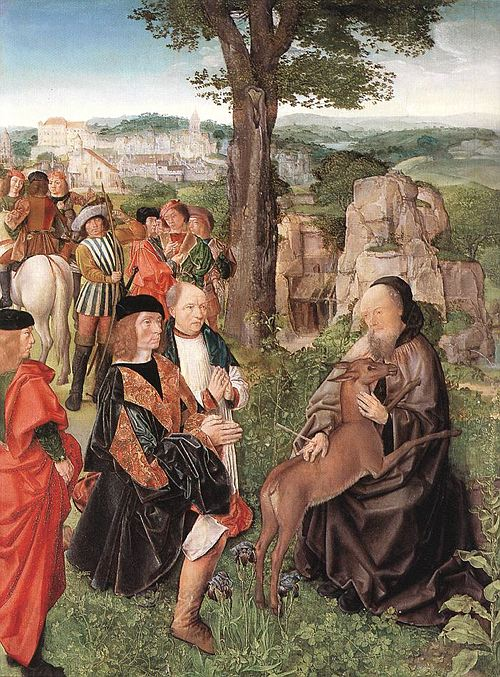
Miracle of Saint Giles, London, with a view of (?) Pontoise

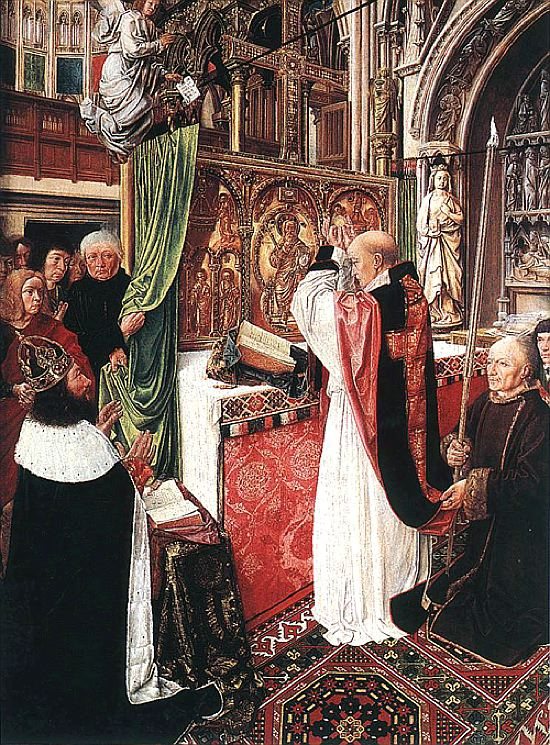
Mass of Saint Giles, London, showing the Abbey of Saint-Denis, with Charles Martel or Charlemagne

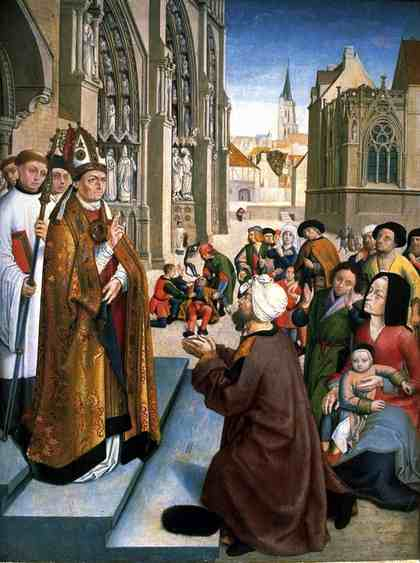
Episodes from the Life of a Bishop-Saint, Washington, set outside the cathedral of Notre Dame de Paris and the Church of Saint-Jean-le-Rond

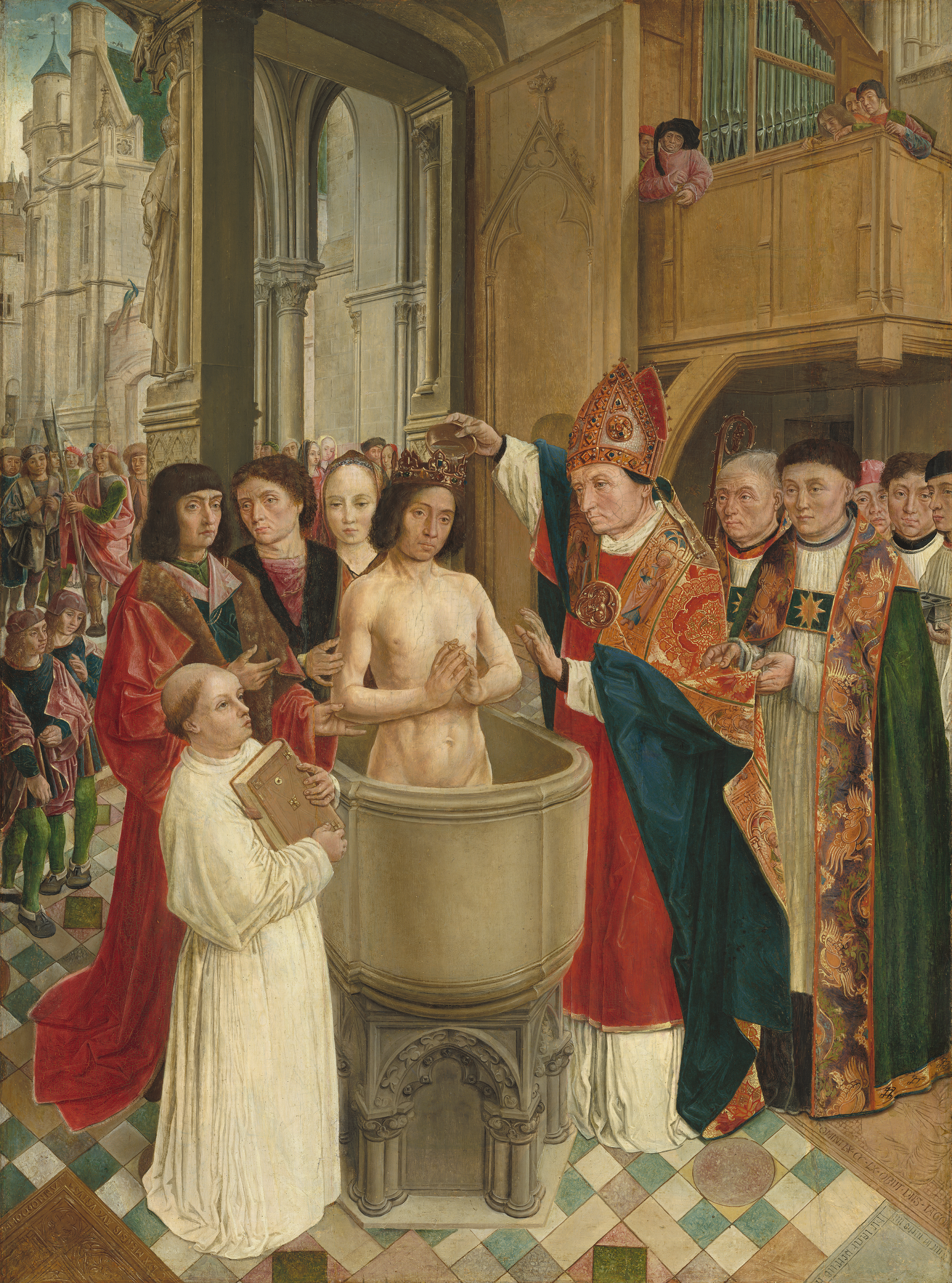
Baptism of Clovis, Washington, set in the Sainte-Chapelle, Paris
