= Manasses I (archbishop of Reims) =

Roman Catholic archbishop

Manasses I, also known as Manasses de Gournay, was a French Catholic prelate who served as Archbishop of Reims and primate of France from c. 1069 until he was deposed in 1080.

== Biography ==
Manasses was the son of Hugh II of Gournay-en-Bray and Adelaide of Dammartin. His brother was Hugh III of Gournay-en-Bray, and his cousins included Peter, Count of Dammartin and Hugh-Rainard, the bishop of Langres. He was a simple cleric before he succeeded Gervase of Chateau-du-Loir as archbishop. His election was opposed by Bishop Helinand of Laon, who tried to buy the appointment from the king.

Manasses was known to be enterprising and liberal and was addressed in a letter by Lanfranc, Archbishop of Canterbury, as "one of the columns of the church". He presided over one of the most intellectually and artistically vibrant episcopal courts of northern Europe. Pope Gregory VII entrusted Manasses with several delicate missions, but the bishop's character was not held in esteem by his former colleagues, the lower clergy. Among them, he was reputed to be tyrannical, violent, corrupt, impatient, insolent, and disregarding of ecclesiastical regulations. His language gave some cause to doubt his piety. According to Guibert of Nogent, writing in his memoirs thirty-five years later in 1115, Manasses was reported to have said that "the archbishop of Reims would be a fine thing, if one were not obligated to sing the Mass!"

A conflict with the monks of Saint-Remi over the installation of a new abbot prompted a legation of monks to complain to the pope. Manasses responded to the abbey's resistance by excommunicating the monks and despoiling their goods. Gregory VII intervened in 1077 to order Geoffrey, Bishop of Paris, to receive and absolve the monks fleeing into his territory. In Autun on 10 September 1077, papal legate Hugh of Die condemned Manasses as a heresiarch, apparently for consenting to the elevation of the bishop of Senlis, suffragan of Reims, to his office by King Philip I. Manasses reacted by defending his conduct in a letter to Gregory and accusing the legates of acting in bad faith.

The archbishop's appeal succeeded, and Gregory restored him to his office in early 1078. Manasses then traveled to Rome in spring 1078 to profess his faith. There he swore his innocence on the relics of St Peter. This was accepted, and Manasses returned to Reims. He continued to move against his political opponents, however, notably the schoolmaster Bruno of Cologne and the provost of the cathedral chapter, also named Manasses (the future Manasses II, Archbishop of Reims). When they complained again to Hugh of Die in 1079, the legate ordered the archbishop to appear before an ecclesiastical synod at Lyon to resolve the dispute once and for all. Manasses refused to make the journey to Lyon, and was suspended and ordered to retreat to the abbey of Cluny. The pope offered him a delay in his sentence if he would make reparations. He never did and was deposed by Pope Gregory VII on 27 December 1080. While Manasses continued to act as archbishop until at least September 1081, he thereafter disappears from the historical record.

== Notes ==
Catholic Church titles
Preceded by Gervase de Château-du-Loir	Archbishop of Reims; 1069 – 1081	Succeeded by Renaud du Bellay
