= Ancient Diocese of Laon =

Roman Catholic diocese in France (5th c. - 1801)

Coordinates: 49.5644°N 3.6239°E

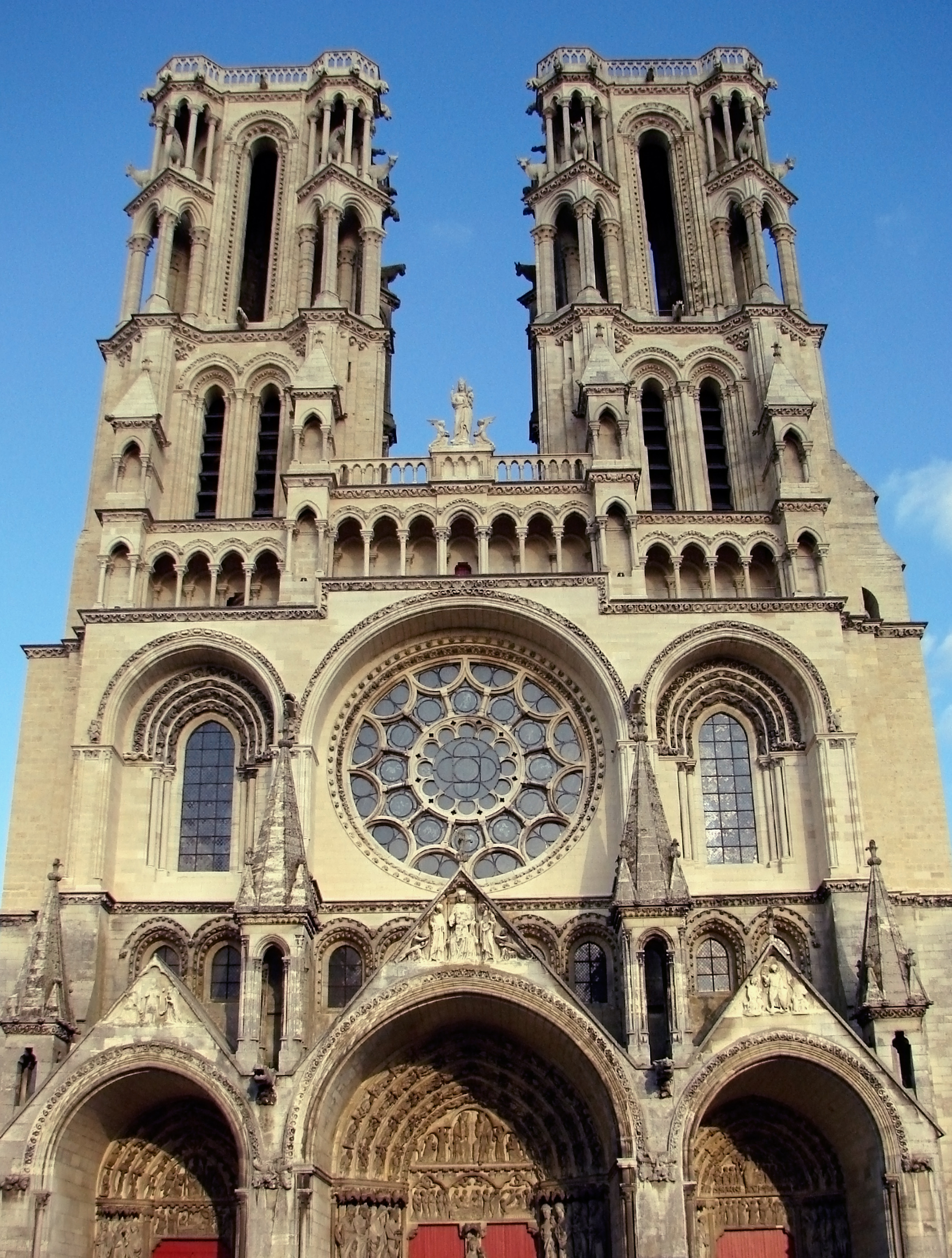
Laon Cathedral

The diocese of Laon in the present-day département of Aisne, was a Catholic diocese for around 1300 years, up to the French Revolution. Its seat was in Laon, France, with Laon Cathedral. From early in the 13th century, the bishop of Laon was a Pair de France, among the elite.

== History ==
The Diocese of Laon was evangelized at an uncertain date by St. Beatus; the see was founded in 487 by St. Remy, who cut it off from the archbishopric of Reims and appointed his nephew St. Genebaldus as bishop.

After an attempt made by the unexecuted Concordat of 11 June 1817 to re-establish the See of Laon, the bishop of Soissons was authorized by Pope Leo XII (13 June 1828) to join the title of Laon to that of his own see. Pope Leo XIII (11 June 1901) further authorized it to use the title of St-Quentin, which was formerly the residence of the bishop of Noyon.

== Bishops ==
Louis Séguier, nominated by Henry IV of France, Bishop of Laon in 1598, refused the nomination to make room for his young nephew Peter de Bérulle, afterwards cardinal and founder of the Oratorians. De Bérulle refused the see.

=== To 1000 ===
- Genebald (Genebaldus) (Genebaud I. or Guénebauld) (499-†550)
- Latro (550-570)
- Gondulphe
- Elinand I. or Ebreling
- Robert I.
- Cagnoald (627-†638)
- Attole or Attila
- Vulfadus
- Serulphe († 681)
- Peregrin
- Madalgaire (ca. 682)
- Liutwin
- Sigoald
- Bertifrid
- Madelvin
- Genebald(us) II (ca. 744)
- Bernicon (ca. 766)
- Gerfrid (774-799)
- Wenilon I. or Ganelon (800-813)
- Wenilon II.
- Egilo
- Ranfrid
- Sigebod
- Ostroald
- Simon († 847)
- Pardulus (848-†856)
- Hincmar the younger (857-876, or 858-871)
- Hedenulphe (876-???)
- Didon (886-895)
- Rudolf († 921)
- Adelelm or Alleaume (921-930)
- Gosbert († 932)
- Ingramme († 936)
- Raoul (936-†949)
- Roricon (949-976), illegitimate son of Charles the Simple
- Adalbero Ascelin (977-† 1030) (of the Wigérides)

=== 1000 to 1300 ===
- Gibwin (1031-1049)
- Leotheric (1049-1052)
- Elinand (1052-†1098)
- Enguerrand († 1104)
- Waldric († 1112)
- Hugo (1112-†1113)
- Barthélemy de Jur (1114–1150)
- Gautier de Mortagne (1151–1174)
- Roger de Rosoy (1175-†1207)
- Renaud Surdelle (1207-†1210)
- Robert de Châtillon (1210-†1215)
- Anselme de Mauny (1215-†1238)
- Garnier (1238-†1248)
- Ithier de Mauny (1248-†1261)
- Guillaume des Moustiers (1262-†1269)
- Geoffroy de Beaumont (1270-†1279)
- Guillaume de Châtillon (1280-†1285)
- Robert de Torote (1285-†1297)
- Gazon de Savigny (1297-†1317)

=== 1300 to 1500 ===
- Raoul Rousselet (1317–1325)
- Albert de Roye (1326-†1336)
- Roger d'Armagnac (1336-†1339)
- Hugues d'Arcy (1339–1351)
- Robert Le Coq (1351-???)
- Geoffroy le Meingre (1363-†1370)
- Pierre Aycelin de Montaigut (1370–1386)
- Jean de Roucy (1386-†1419)
- Guillaume II. de Champeaux (1420-†1444)
- Jean Juvénal des Ursins (1444–1449), afterwards Archbishop of Reims
- Antoine Crespin (1449–1460)
- Jean de Gaucourt (1460-†1468)
- Karl of Luxemburg (1472-†1509)
- Pierre Aycelin de Montaigut (1371–86), cardinal in 1383

=== From 1500 ===
- Louis de Bourbon de Vendôme (1510–1552)
- Jean Doc (1552–1564)
- Jean de Bours (1564-†1580)
- Valentin Douglas (1580-†1598)
- Geoffroy de Billy (1598-†1612)
- Benjamin de Brichanteau (1612-†1619)
- Philibert de Brichanteau (1620-†1652)
- César d'Estrées (1655–1681)
- Jean III. d'Estrées (1681–1718)
- Louis Annet de Clermont de Chaste de Roussillon (-1721)
- Charles de Saint Albin (1721–1723)
- Henri François-Xavier de Belsunce-Castelmoron (1723)
- Etienne Josephe de la Fare (1723–1741)
- Jean-François-Joseph de Rochechouard de Faudoas (1741–1777)
- Louis Hector Honoré Maxime de Sabran

== See also ==
- Catholic Church in France
- List of Catholic dioceses in France

== Bibliography ==
=== Reference works ===
- Gams, Pius Bonifatius (1873). Series episcoporum Ecclesiae catholicae: quotquot innotuerunt a beato Petro apostolo. Ratisbon: Typis et Sumptibus Georgii Josephi Manz. (Use with caution; obsolete)
- Eubel, Conradus, ed. (1913). Hierarchia catholica, Tomus 1 (second ed.). Münster: Libreria Regensbergiana. (in Latin)
- Eubel, Conradus, ed. (1914). Hierarchia catholica, Tomus 2 (second ed.). Münster: Libreria Regensbergiana. (in Latin)
- Eubel, Conradus; Gulik, Guilelmus (1923). Hierarchia catholica (second ed.). Münster: Libreria Regensbergiana.
- Gauchat, Patritius (Patrice) (1935). Hierarchia catholica IV (1592-1667). Münster: Libraria Regensbergiana.
- Ritzler, Remigius; Sefrin, Pirminus (1952). Hierarchia catholica medii et recentis aevi V (1667-1730). Patavii: Messagero di S. Antonio.
- Ritzler, Remigius; Sefrin, Pirminus (1958). Hierarchia catholica medii et recentis aevi VI (1730-1799). Patavii: Messagero di S. Antonio.

=== Studies ===
- Duchesne, Louis (1910). Fastes épiscopaux de l'ancienne Gaule: II. L'Aquitaine et les Lyonnaises. Paris: Fontemoing.
- Du Tems, Hugues (1774). Le clergé de France, ou tableau historique et chronologique des archevêques, évêques, abbés, abbesses et chefs des chapitres principaux du royaume, depuis la fondation des églises jusqu'à nos jours (in French). Vol. Tome premier. Paris: Delalain.
- Jean, Armand (1891). Les évêques et les archevêques de France depuis 1682 jusqu'à 1801 (in French). Paris: A. Picard.
