= Laon Cathedral =

- Cathédrale Notre-Dame de Laon (French)
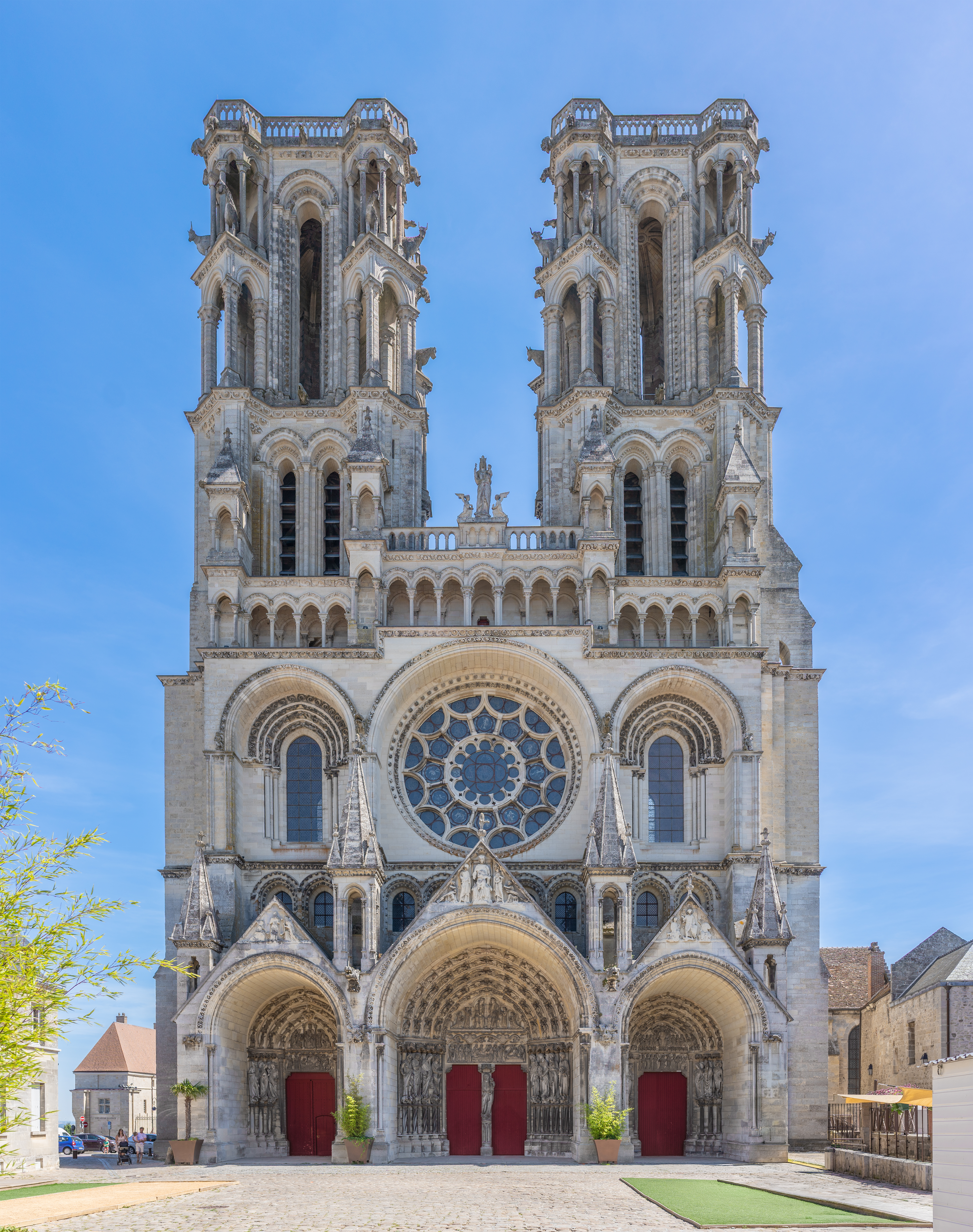
- West front
- Laon Cathedral
- 49.5643°N 3.625°E
- Location: Laon, Aisne, Hauts-de-France, France
- Denomination: Roman Catholic

History
- Status: Parish church (formerly cathedral)

Architecture
- Functional status: Active
- Architectural type: Cathedral
- Style: French Gothic
- Groundbreaking: 1150
- Completed: 1235

Administration
- Diocese: Soissons (formerly Laon)

Monument historique
- Type: Cathédrale
- Designated: 1840
- Reference no.: PA00115710

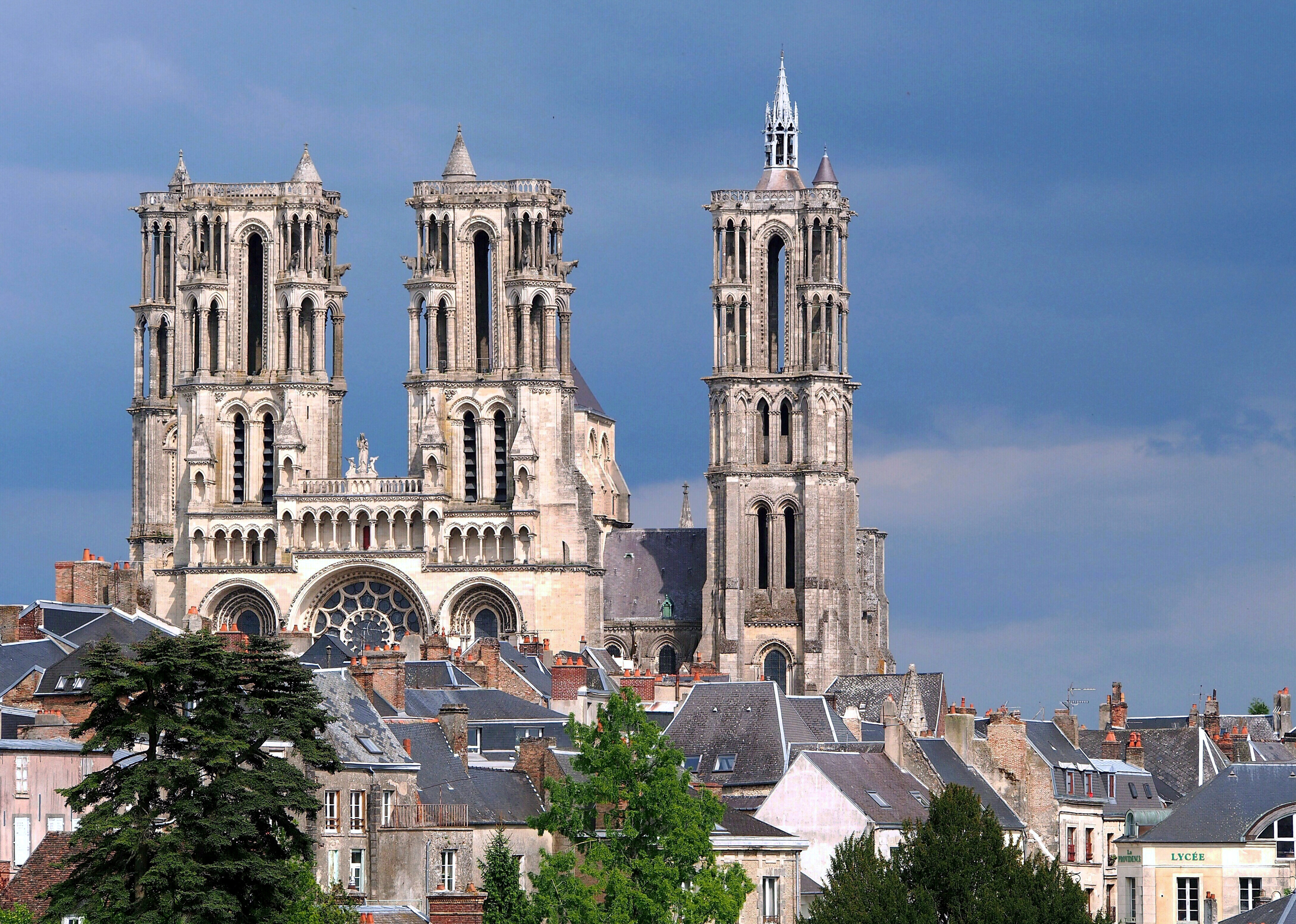
Laon Cathedral from the southwest

Laon Cathedral (French: Cathédrale Notre-Dame de Laon) is a Roman Catholic church located in Laon, Aisne, Hauts-de-France, France. Built in the twelfth and thirteenth centuries, it is one of the most important and stylistically unified examples of early Gothic architecture. The church served as the cathedral of the Diocese of Laon until 1802, and has been recognized as a monument historique since 1840.

== History ==
=== Early history ===
The Diocese of Laon was established by archbishop Remigius of Reims at the end of the fifth century. Presumably, an early church was erected soon afterward. Laon soon became one of the principal towns of the Frankish Empire.

A later church building, dating from the tenth or eleventh centuries, was torched during the Easter Insurrection on 25 April 1112. The merchants and bourgeoisie of Laon had procured a communal charter, which was soon revoked by Bishop Gaudry. The commune revolted, murdering the bishop. The episcopal palace was set alight; the fire soon spread to the cathedral. Afterward, the peasant population took the opportunity to pillage the town. Three months after the insurrection, members of the clergy at Laon toured France and England with relics belonging to the bishopric. Using funds raised from the tour, the church was reconstructed and consecrated on August 20, 1114, under Barthélemy de Jur.

However, as the population of Laon grew, it soon became clear that a larger cathedral was necessary. Laon's economy was booming, and Anselm of Laon's school of theology and exegesis was becoming one of the most acclaimed in Europe. Additionally, Laon's communal charter was reestablished in 1130. By the late 1150s, construction on the current cathedral had begun under Gautier de Mortagne; it was essentially completed by 1230.

=== Current building ===
The present Laon Cathedral dates from the 12th and early 13th centuries, an early example of the Gothic style that originated in northern France. It was built half a century after the erection of the Basilica of Saint-Denis, which originated the Gothic style. Construction on Laon Cathedral began with the choir and portions of both transepts between approximately 1160 and 1170. By 1180, the transept arms were finished and the eastern portion of the nave was erected. In the next phase of construction, lasting until the end of the century, the nave and most of the massive western façade were completed. Shortly after, the Chapel des Fonts, cloister, and chapter house were built onto the south side of the nave. Next, spurred by the donation of a local quarry in 1205, the original choir was dismantled and the current, larger choir was constructed by 1220. Soon after, the treasury and sacristy were built at the junctures of the choir and transepts, along with a large chapel extending from the southeastern end of the choir. Over the century, additional chapels were built off the aisles of the nave and the choir. Finally, the south transept's façade was remodelled in the early fourteenth century, resulting in the current twin doors and tracery window.

=== Later history ===
Laon lost its status as a bishopric during the French Revolution. Following the Concordat of 1802, the building has functioned as a parish church under the Diocese of Soissons.

The cathedral was modified extensively during the nineteenth century. The tower foundations were rebuilt with masonry to prevent them from collapsing. The flying buttresses attached to the nave and transepts were rebuilt to match those bracing the choir. An ornate but structurally artificial upper extension of the cathedral's front facade of unknown date was removed; it was replaced by a balustrade and the current Madonna and Child statue. Open doorways that historically had pierced the walls between the west entry portals were blocked in. Most notably, many of the medieval sculptural programs on the western facade were heavily altered.

By this time, fissures had appeared in the upper walls at the west end of the nave. To help counteract this problem, a low arch was constructed, crossing to nave near the entry portals. In 1899, timber flooring was installed between the towers in the west end of the nave to accommodate the installation of the current organ. The low structural arch became the platform's east support. This project remains controversial, as the organ pipes currently block the lower western windows and half of the rose window. However, the older and much smaller stone organ platform still survives under the current timber construction.

Although the cathedral suffered some damage during the French Revolution and the Franco-Prussian War of 1870, it escaped both World Wars unharmed.

== Architecture ==
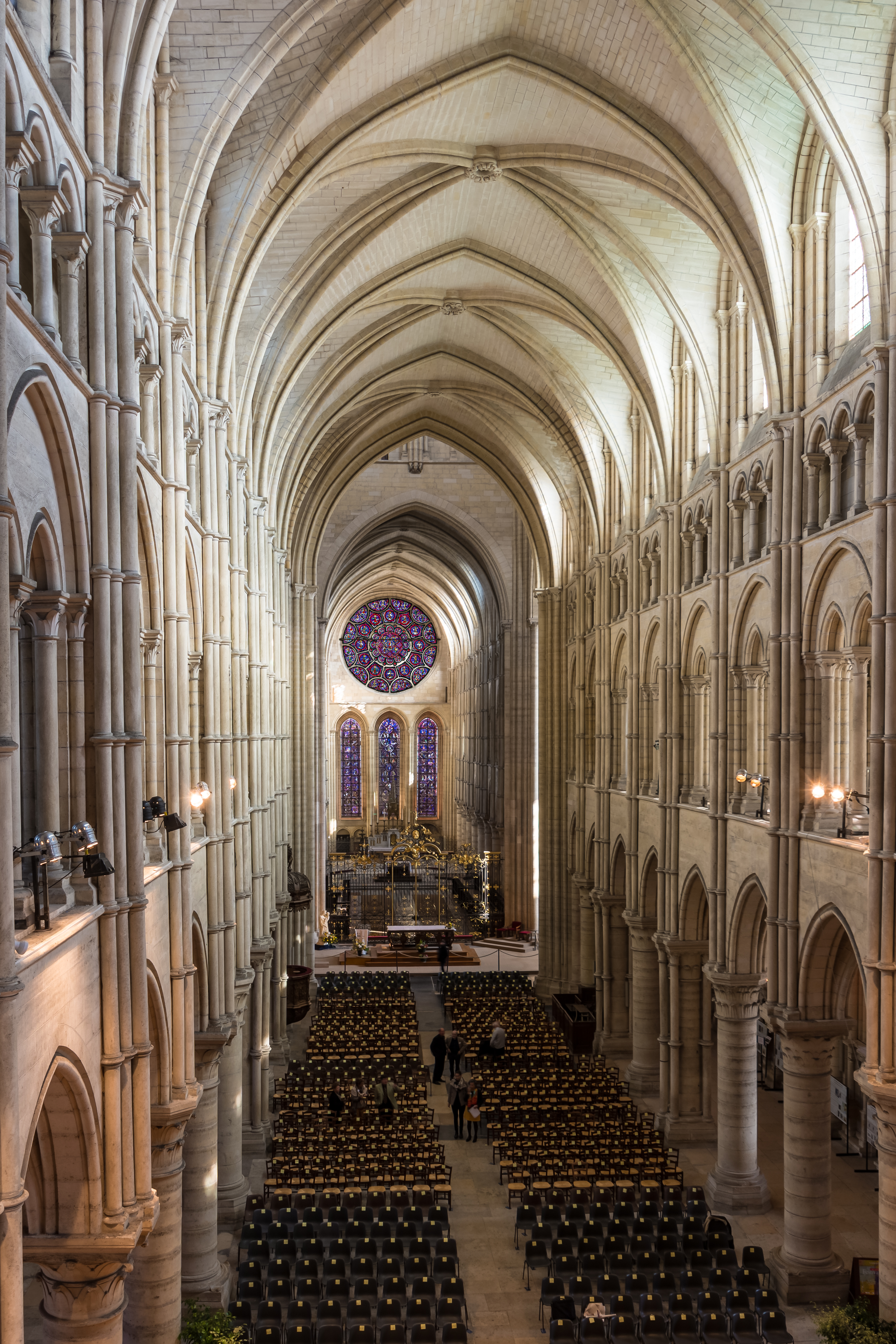
Interior

Contemporary with Noyon Cathedral and Notre-Dame de Paris, Laon Cathedral is one of the most elaborate and best-preserved of the early French Gothic cathedrals. It is notable for the stylistic unity and consistency maintained over the different phases of its construction. The cathedral consists of a cruciform plan with the traditional nave, transepts, and choir, all flanked by single side aisles. Numerous chapels have been built projecting out the exterior aisle walls. The nave has twelve bays (including the bay over the organ platform), counterbalanced by the ten in the choir. Both transepts have four bays. A central lantern tower, the focal point of the cathedral's interior, rises over the intersection. The ceiling over the choir and the nave (with the exception of the west end, near the organ) incorporates sexpartite vaulting, while the ceiling in the transepts incorporates quadripartite vaulting.

Vertically, Laon Cathedral is divided into four tiers: ground-level side aisles, a tribune-level passageway with double arches, a short triforium-level passageway with triple arches, and clerestory windows. The passageways on the two middle levels circumnavigate the entirety of the building, possibly indicating Norman influence. The unusual four-tiered configuration was previously used in both Tournai Cathedral in modern-day Belgium and Noyon Cathedral, and is reflected locally in the south transept of nearby Soissons Cathedral. The height of the interior is emphasized by the colonnette shafts rising from the tops of the columns separating the aisle bays; these colonnette shafts regularly alternate between three and five in number.

Although the choirs of most Gothic churches terminate with apses, Laon's choir is an exception: it terminates with a flat wall. The cathedral's original choir was much shorter, and it terminated in a more conventional apse and ambulatory. Although the original choir encoded the stylistic template for the rest of the building, it was demolished and replaced in the early thirteenth century. The longer, current choir was more proportionally appropriate for the cathedral.

Each end of the church culminates in a rose window, except for the southern transept. Instead, the south transept features a massive arched tracery window, which replaced the original rose in the early fourteenth century. The facades of both transepts incorporate twin entry doors; the south doors open next to the cathedral's adjoining cloister and chapter house, while the north doors open near the old episcopal palace. The massive west facade of the cathedral, at the nave end, is notable for its dynamic use of spatial projections. Three deeply recessed portals provide entry into the church; an arched passageway sits over them; between this passageway and a second, higher one, two Gothic-arched lancet windows and the central rose window cut into the wall. The facade is topped by the uppermost portions of the twin towers and four smaller pinnacles.

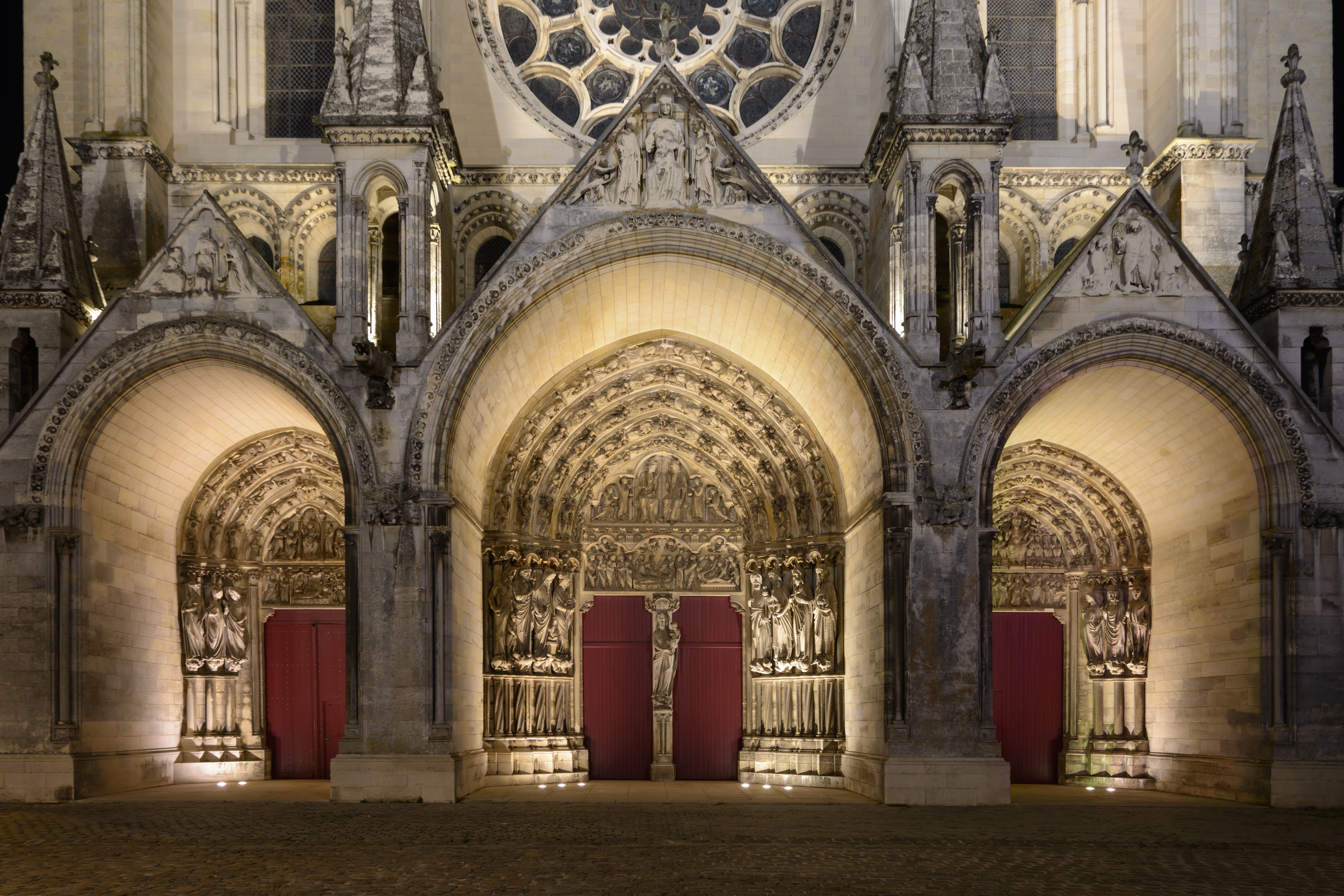
Portals

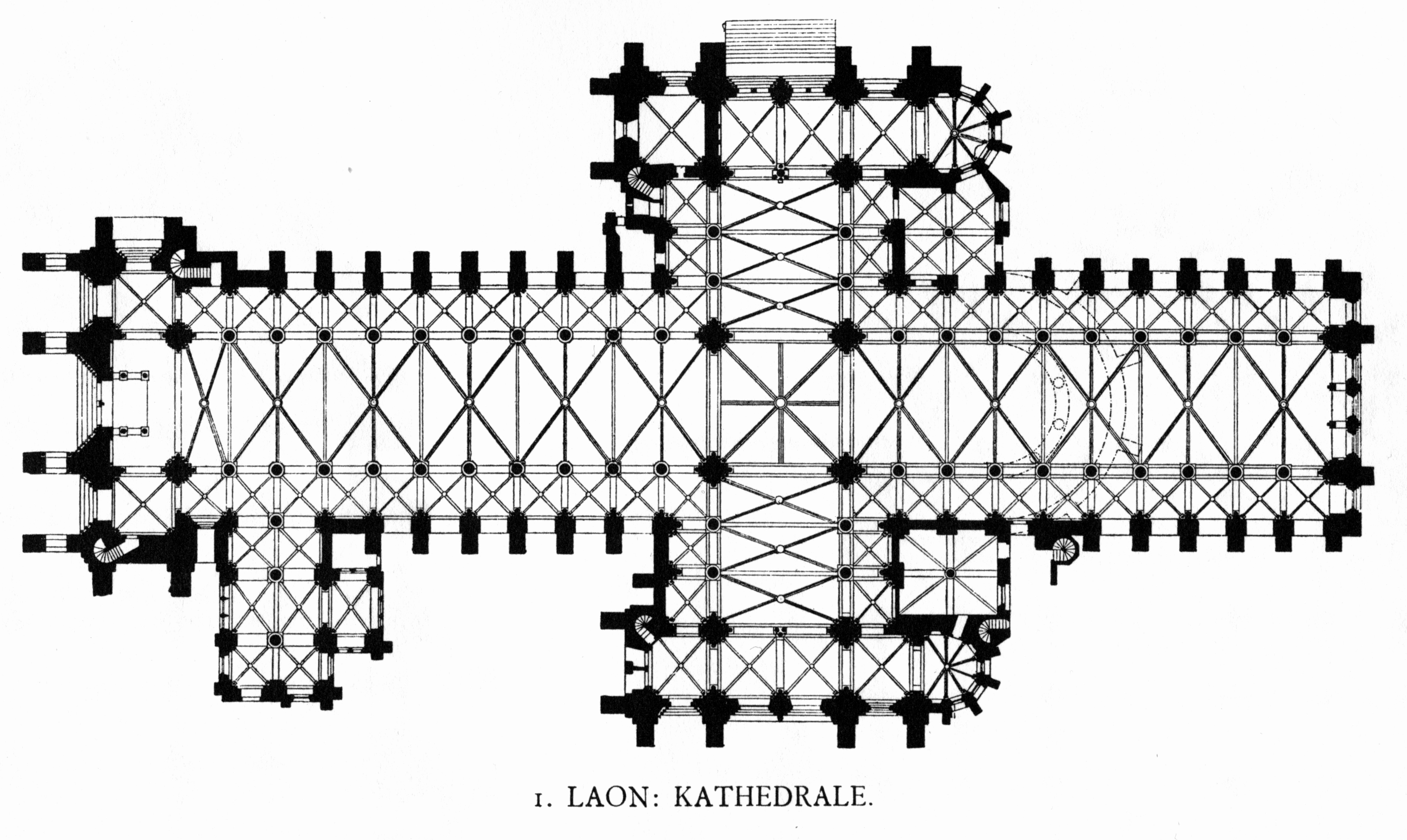
Floor plan

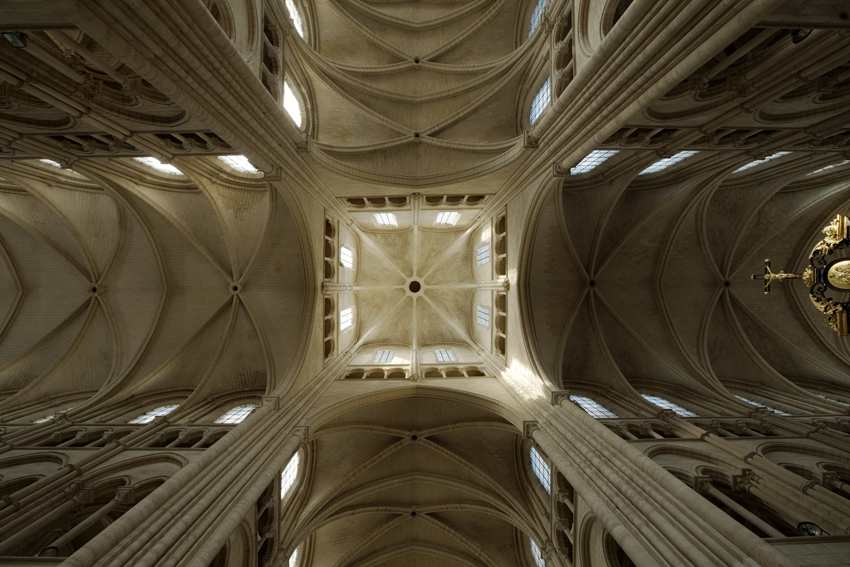
Crossing tower

=== Towers ===
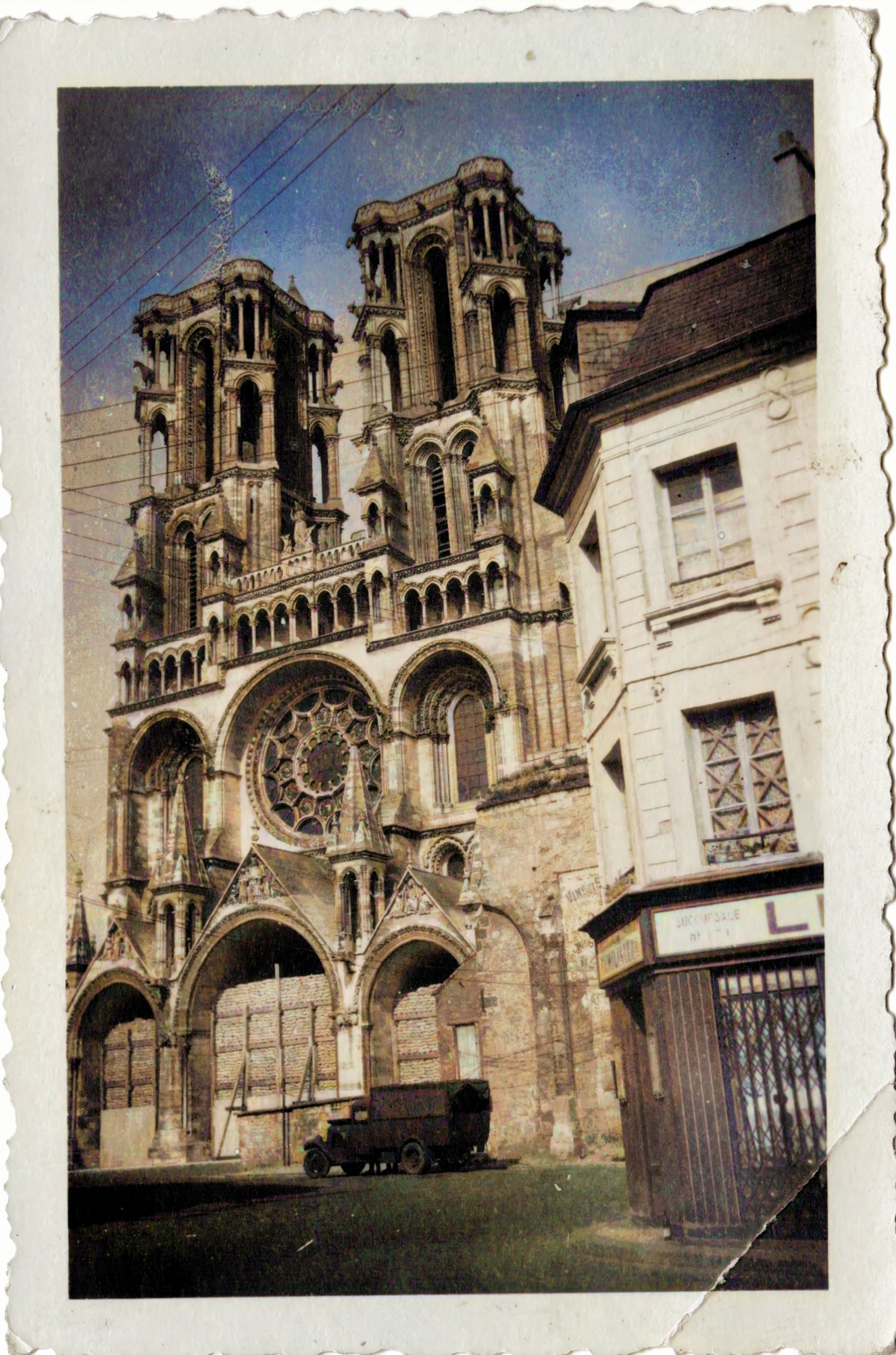
Laon Cathedral in 1940. Note sandbagged front entries and the French army truck in front

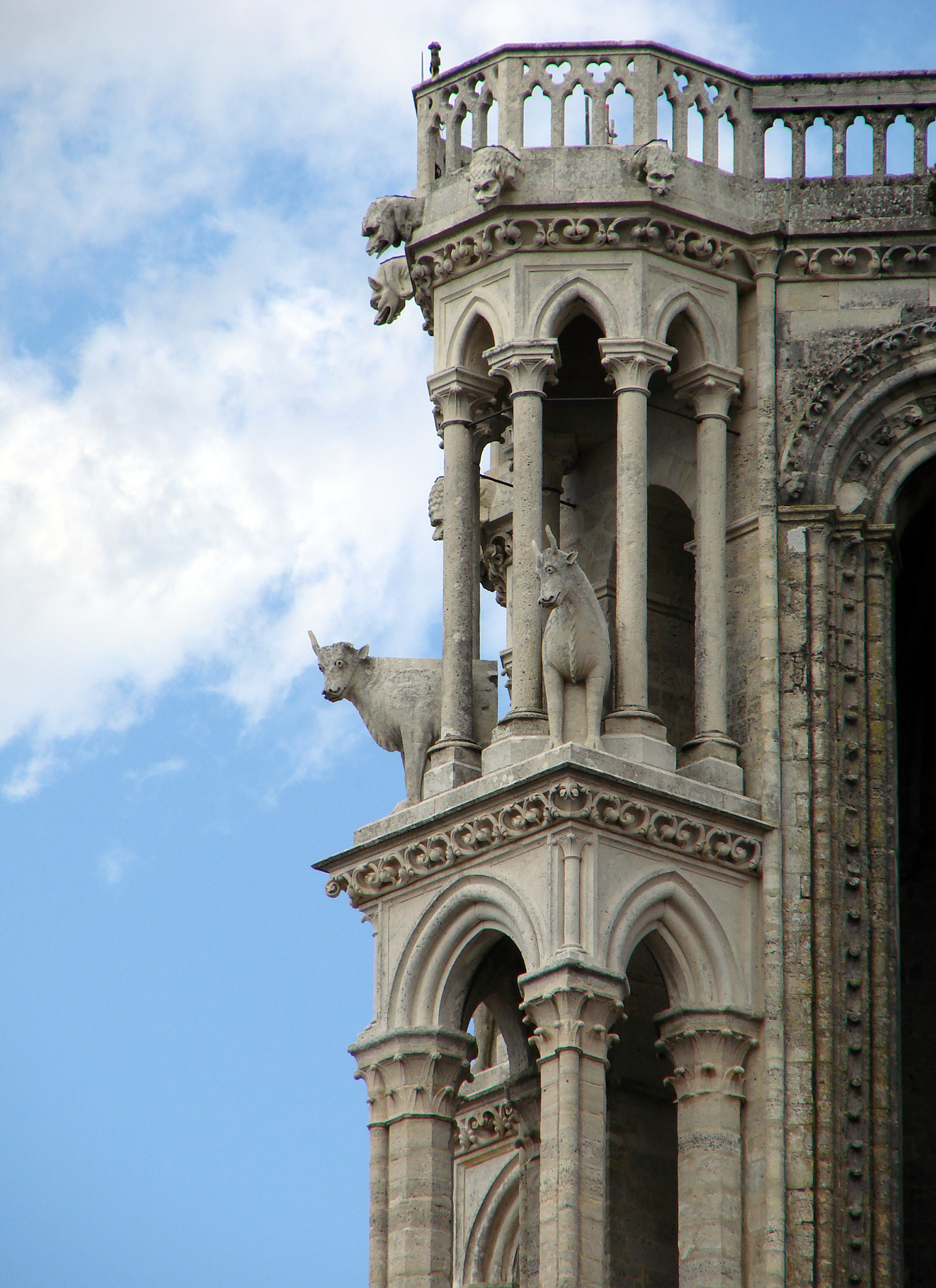
Oxen tower statuary

Of the seven planned towers, only five were completed to the height of the base of the spires. These include the square central crossing tower that forms a lantern tower illuminating the crossing, the two towers flanking the western facade, and the two transept towers. Both transepts were planned to have second towers, which were never completed. Laon Cathedral's completed towers (with the exception of that at the central crossing) all consist of two stacked vaulted chambers pierced by lancet openings. They transition from square profiles at their bases to elaborated octagons at their peaks. Medieval artist Villard de Honnecourt made detailed drawings of one of the towers of Laon circa 1230; in his eyes, the towers at Laon perfectly utilized the geometry and "true measure" ideally expressed in Gothic architecture. The two western towers contain life-size stone statues of sixteen oxen in their upper arcades, seemingly commemorating the bullocks who hauled equipment and materials during the cathedral's construction.

=== Stained glass ===
The cathedral's stained glass dates mostly from the thirteenth century, with some nineteenth-century augmentations. Among the surviving medieval windows are the three lancet windows at the east end of the church, overlooking the choir. The right window depicts scenes from the life of Mary and from Jesus' childhood. The central window continues the Jesus narrative, from his triumphal entry into Jerusalem to his ascension. The left windows depicts scenes from the legend of Theophilus of Adana and the Biblical account of Saint Stephen. The rose window above the lancets is dedicated to Mary; it also contains twelve medallions depicting the twelve apostles and twenty-four medallions depicting the Four and Twenty Elders from the Book of Revelation. Departing from strictly religious themes, the rose window in the north transept contains personifications of the sciences of the trivium (grammar, dialectic, and rhetoric) and the quadrivium (arithmetic, geometry, music, and astronomy).

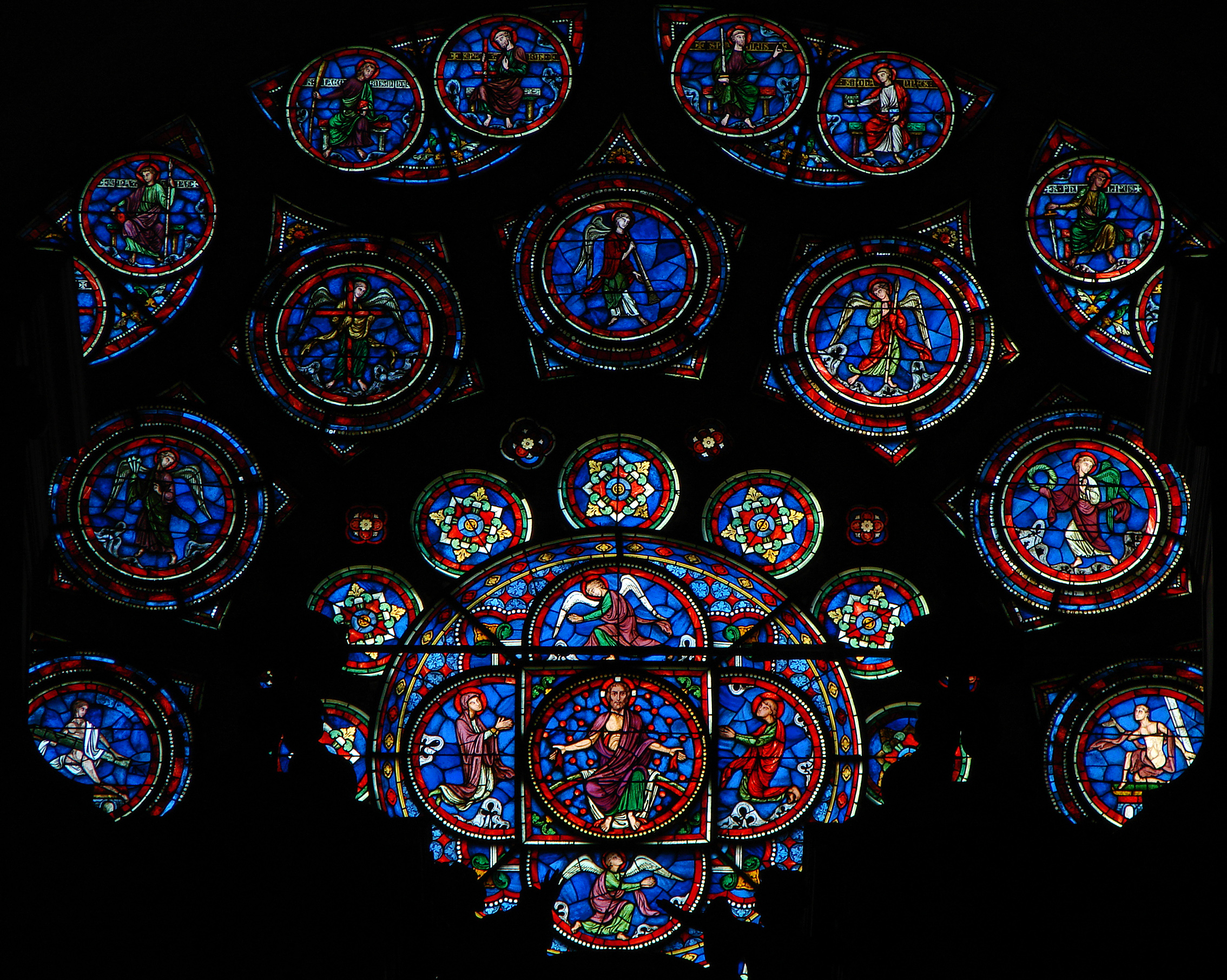
West rose

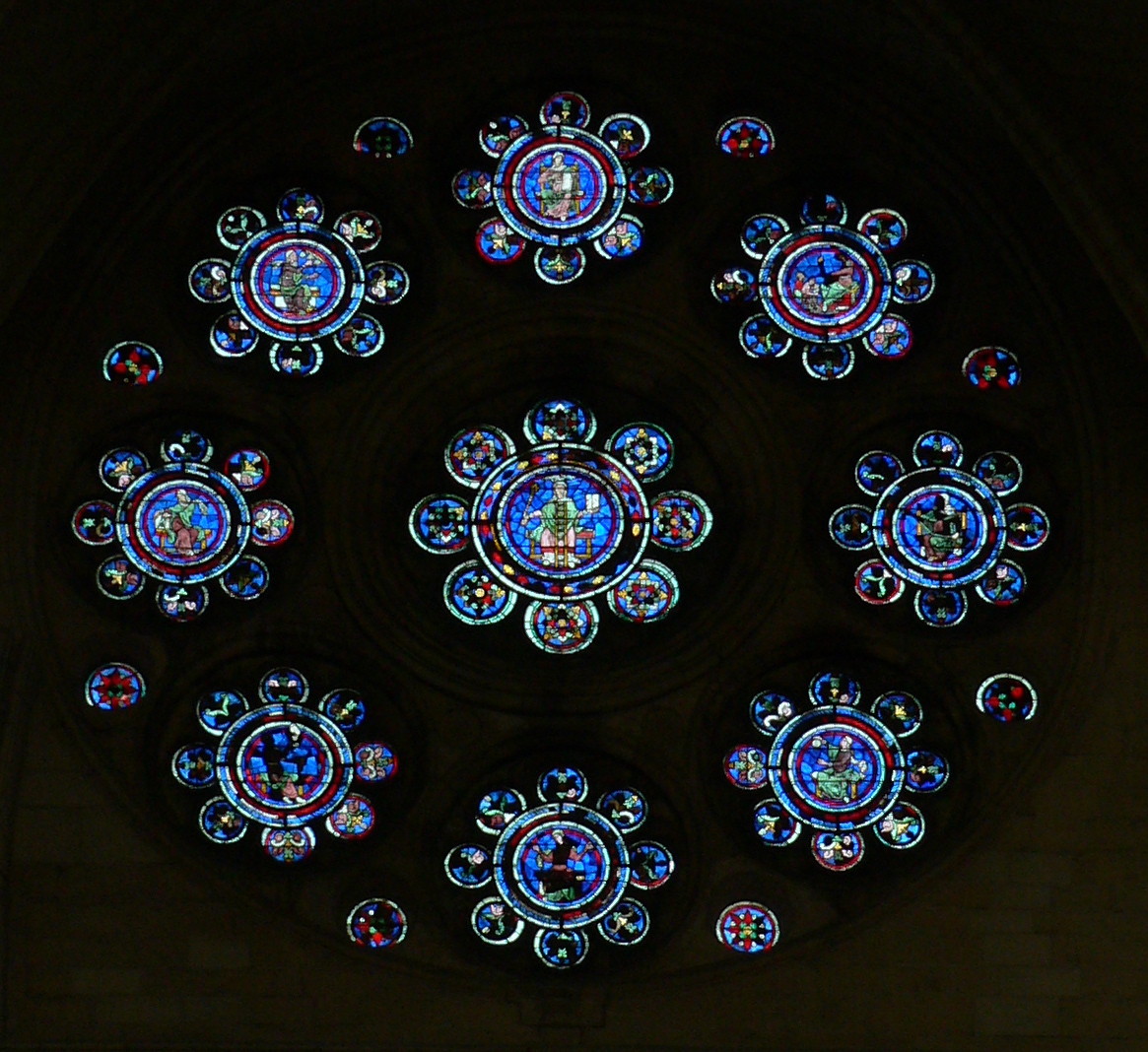
North rose

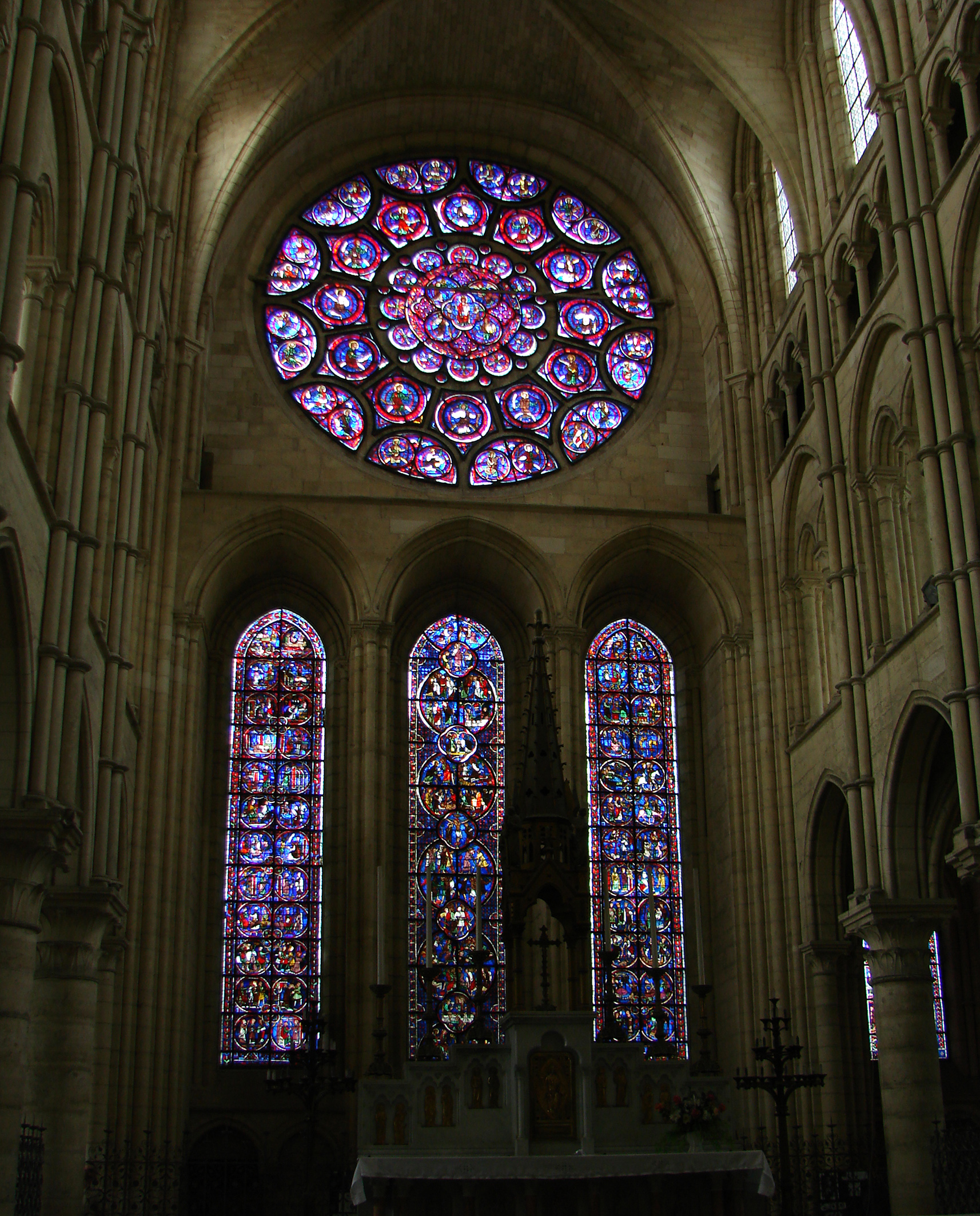
East windows

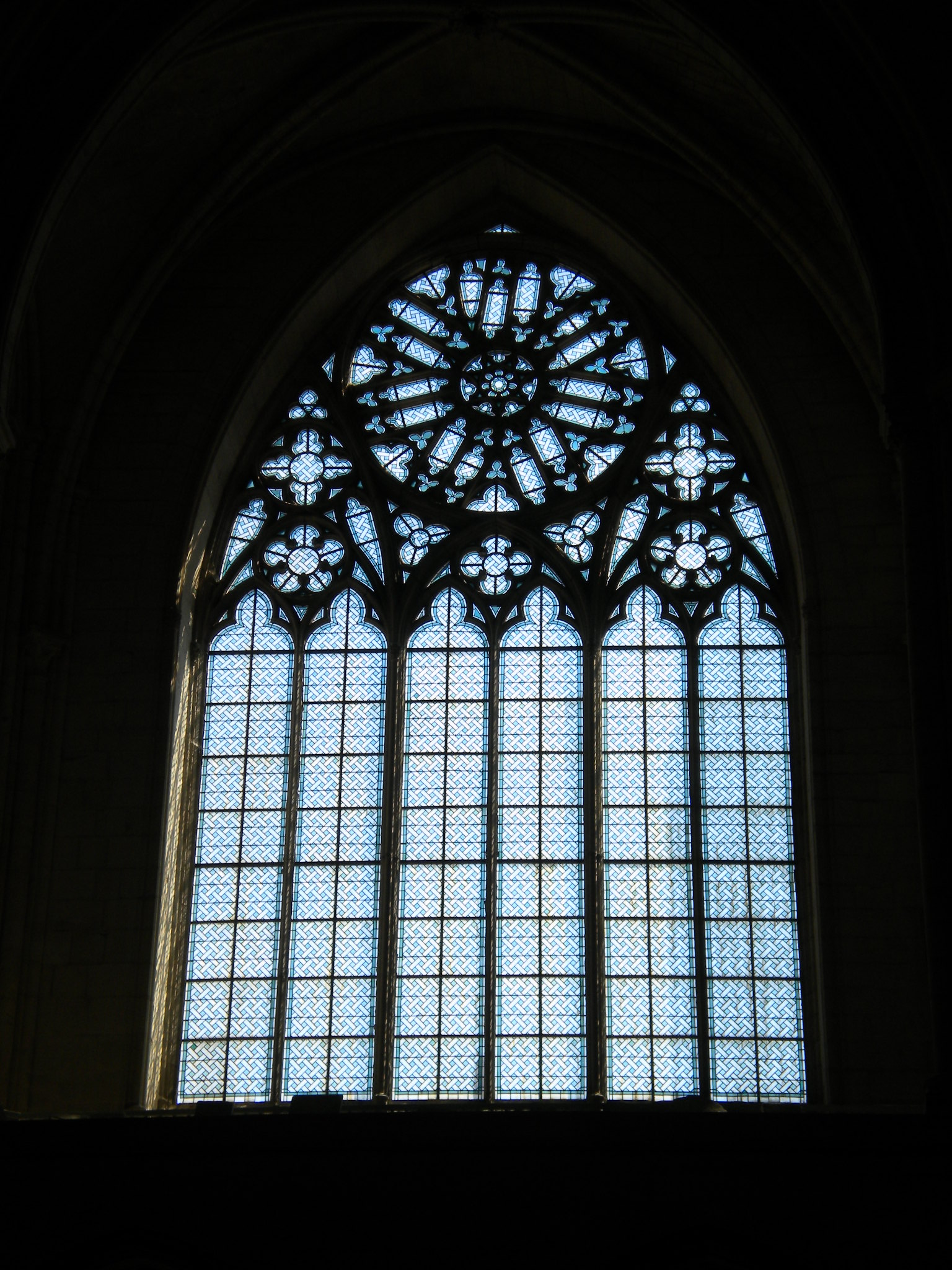
South window

== Notable people ==
- Theologian Anselm of Laon served as dean and chancellor of the cathedral in the early twelfth century.
- Composer Pierre Dumage was organist of the cathedral from 1710 to 1719.
- Adolf Hitler visited the cathedral on June 25, 1940.
- Artist Robert Delaunay depicted the cathedral towers in his 1912 painting Les Tours de Laon, exemplifying his transition away from figurative compositions towards the abstract movement of Orphism.

== See also ==
- Early Gothic architecture
- Gothic cathedrals and churches
- French Gothic architecture
- French Gothic stained glass windows
- List of Gothic Cathedrals in Europe
