= List of senators of Aisne =

Location of Aisne in France

Following is a list of senators of Aisne, people who have represented the department of Aisne in the Senate of France.

== Third Republic ==
Senators for Aisne under the French Third Republic were:

Term	Name
1876–1883	Henri Martin
1876–1886	Charles de Saint-Vallier
1876–1894	William Waddington
1885–1903	François Malézieux
1886–1917	Charles Sébline
1889–1903	Aimé Leroux
1894–1904	Alfred Macherez
1903–1919	Charles Gentilliez
1904–1930	Georges Ermant
1905–1924	Eugène Touron
1920–1930	Léon Chenebenoit
1920–1932	Louis de Lubersac
1925–1945	Émile Roussel
1930–1945	Charles Desjardins
1930–1934	Émile Villemant
1932–1940	René Hachette
1934–1945	Henri Rillart de Verneuil

== Fourth Republic ==
Senators for Aisne under the French Fourth Republic were:

Term	Name
1946–1948	Paul Gargominy
1946–1948	Raoul Sauer
1948–1955	Jacques Beauvais
1948–1955	Jean Clavier
1948–1955	Louis Ternynck
1955–1959	René Blondelle
1955–1959	Jean Deguise
1955–1959	Léon Droussent

== Fifth Republic ==
Senators for Aisne under the French Fifth Republic:

Term	Name	Group	Notes
1959–1962	René Blondelle	Centre Républicain d'Action Rurale et Sociale	
1959–1962	Jean Deguise	Républicains Populaires	
1959–1962	Louis Roy	Union pour la Nouvelle République	
1962–1971	René Blondelle	Centre Républicain d'Action Rurale et Sociale	Died in office 25 February 1971
1962–1971	Jacques Moquet	Union des Démocrates pour la République	From 26 February 1971 in place of René Blondelle
1962–1971	Jean Deguise	Républicains Populaires	
1962–1971	Louis Roy	Union pour la Nouvelle République	Died 24 April 1966
1962–1971	Jacques Pelletier	Rassemblement Démocratique et Social Européen	Elected 26 June 1966
1971–1980	Jacques Braconnier	Rassemblement pour la République	
1971–1980	Jacques Pelletier	Rassemblement Démocratique et Social Européen	To 6 May 1978 (named to cabinet)
1971–1980	Gilbert Devèze	Républicains et Indépendants	From 7 May 1978 in place of Jacques Pelletier
1980–1989	Jacques Braconnier	Rassemblement pour la République	
1980–1989	Paul Girod	Union pour un Mouvement Populaire	
1980–1989	Jacques Pelletier	Rassemblement Démocratique et Social Européen	To 12 June 1988 (named to cabinet)
1980–1989	François Lesein	Rassemblement Démocratique et Social Européen	From 13 June 1988 in place of Jacques Pelletier
1989–1998	Jacques Braconnier	Rassemblement pour la République	
1989–1998	Paul Girod	Union pour un Mouvement Populaire	
1989–1998	Jacques Pelletier	Rassemblement Démocratique et Social Européen	To 1 November 1989 (named to cabinet)
1989–1998	François Lesein	Rassemblement Démocratique et Social Européen	From 2 November 1998 in place of Jacques Pelletier
1998–2008	Pierre André	Union pour un Mouvement Populaire	
1998–2008	Paul Girod	Union pour un Mouvement Populaire	
1998–2008	Jacques Pelletier	Rassemblement Démocratique et Social Européen	Died in office 3 September 2007
2008–2017	Pierre André	Union pour un Mouvement Populaire	
2008–2017	Yves Daudigny	Socialiste et républicain	
2008–2017	Antoine Lefèvre	Les Républicains	
2017–present	Pascale Gruny	Les Républicains	
2017–present	Yves Daudigny	Socialiste et républicain	
2017–present	Antoine Lefèvre	Les Républicains	

== Sources ==
- Liste des anciens sénateurs de la IIIème République par circonscription (in French), Sénat de France
- Liste des anciens sénateurs de la IVème République par circonscription (in French), Sénat de France
- Liste des anciens sénateurs de la Vème République par circonscription (in French), Sénat de France
- Liste par département – Aisne (in French), Sénat de France
