= Clairfontaine =

- Commune
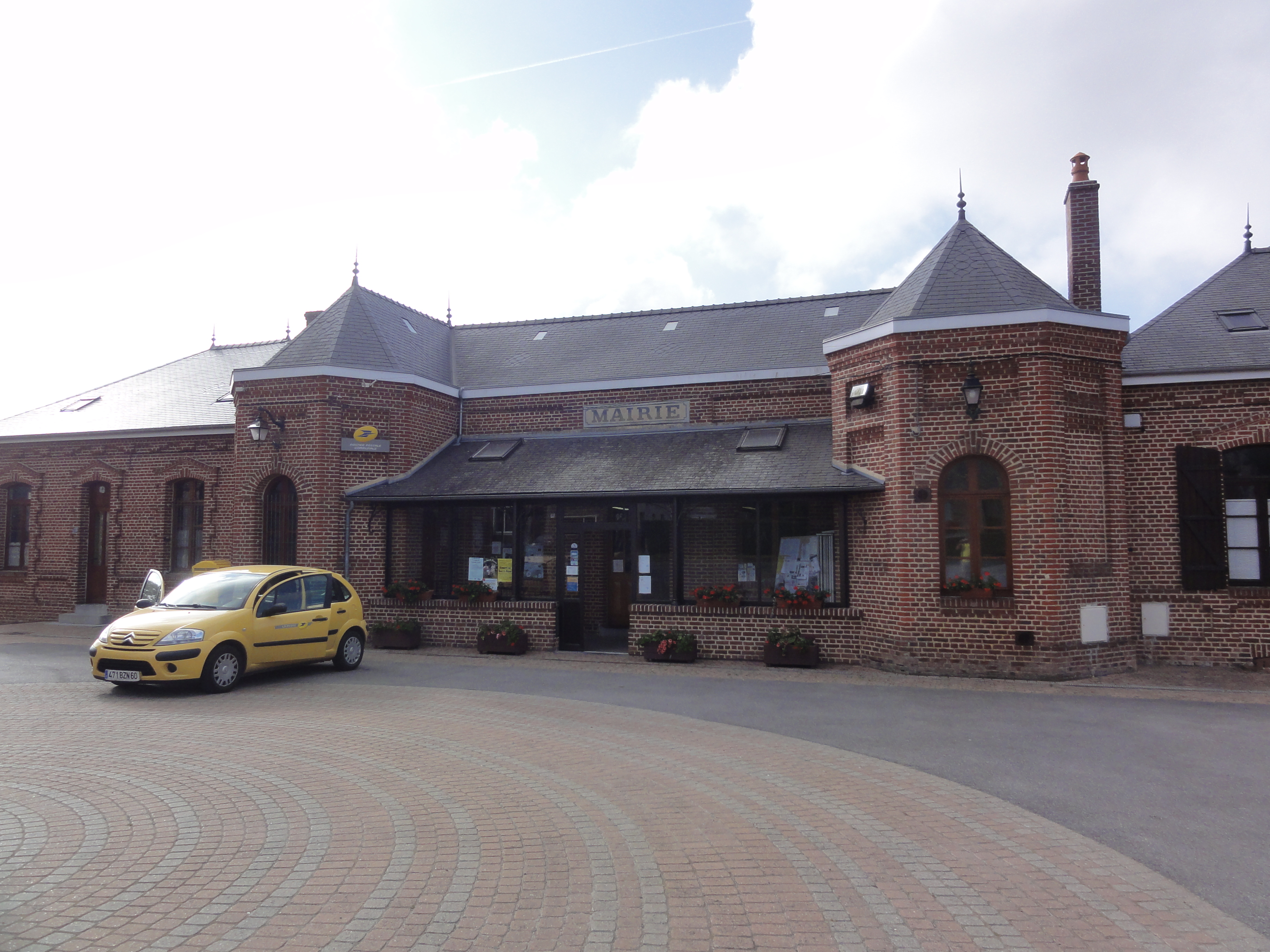
- The town hall of Clairfontaine
- Location of Clairfontaine
- Location within France Location within Hauts-de-France
- Coordinates: 49°58′50″N 3°59′10″E
- Country: France
- Region: Hauts-de-France
- Department: Aisne
- Arrondissement: Vervins
- Canton: Vervins
- Intercommunality: Thiérache du Centre

Government
  - Mayor (2026–32): Régis Tricoteaux
- Area^{1}: 14.31 km^{2} (5.53 sq mi)
- Elevation: 238 m (781 ft)
- Highest elevation: 239 m (784 ft)
- Lowest elevation: 152 m (499 ft)
- Population (2023): 509
  - Density: 35.6/km^{2} (92.1/sq mi)
- Time zone: UTC+01:00 (CET)
  - Summer (DST): UTC+02:00 (CEST)
- INSEE/Postal code: 02197 /02260
- ^{1} French Land Register data, which excludes lakes, ponds, glaciers > 1 km^{2} (0.386 sq mi or 247 acres) and river estuaries.

Clairfontaine (French pronunciation: [klɛʁfɔ̃tɛn]) is a commune in the Aisne department in the Hauts-de-France area of northern France.

== Geography ==
=== Location ===
Clairfontaine is situated in the region of Thierache (northeast of the Aisne department).

The commune is characterised by its wooded countryside, which is found on the border of Fourmies, in the north of the department.

=== Climate ===
Several studies have been undertaken to characterise the climatic types which the area experiences. The zonings obtained differ depending on the method used, the number and type of parameters taken into account, the territorial network of data and the reference period. In 2010, the climate of the commune was classified as mountainous, according to the French National Centre for Scientific Research (CNRS), based on a method combining climate data and environmental factors (topography, land-use, etc.) and data covering the period of 1971–2000. In 2020, the predominant climate during 1988–2017 was classed as "Cfb" according to the Koppen classification system, namely a temperate climate with cool summers and without a dry season. In 2020, Météo-France published a new typology of the climates in metropolitan France in which the commune is exposed to an altered oceanic climate and is in the climatic region of the Northeastern Parisian basin, characterised by limited sunshine, average rainfall evenly distributed throughout the year, and a cold winter. It is located in zone H1a under the 2020 environmental regulations of new constructions, which serve to calculate energy efficiency based on climate. Between 1971 and 2000, the average annual temperature was 9.4 °C, with an annual temperature range of 4.1 °C. The average annual rainfall was 956 mm, with 13.7 days of precipitation and 9.9 in July. For 1991–2020, the average annual temperature observed at the nearest Météo-France weather station, in the commune of Fontaine-lès-Vervins (15 km away), is 10.5 °C and the average annual rainfall is 826.3 mm. The maximum temperature recorded by the station is 39.5 °C, recorded on 25 July 2019; the minimum temperature is -16 °C, reached on 7 January 2009.

== Urban planning ==
=== Classification ===
As of the 1 January 2025, Clairfontaine is classed as a rural commune with dispersed housing, according to the 7-level municipal population density grid established by INSEE in 2022. It is not located in an urban area and is outside the influence of any cities.

== Toponymy ==
The settlement is known to have been referred to by the Latin "Clarus fons" in 1136, as it was established near a spring, the clarity of which gave the settlement its name. The French word "fontaine" was not demonstrated until the 12th century and is derived from the Latin "fons" (via "fontana" & "fontanus").

The English translation of Clairfontaine is "clear fountain".

== Histoire ==
The village of Clairfontaine owes its origin to the Clairfontaine Abbey, which was founded in the (then uninhabited) area, at the beginning of the 12th century.

A certain Albéric watned to take up the hermetic lifestyle with several other clerics, who had come together under his leadership, asked Guy, Lord of Guise, and obtained this loneliness in 1124. Two years later, this community affiliated itself with the Prémontré Abbey.

== Population ==
Historical population
Year	Pop.	±% p.a.
1968	597	—
1975	519	−1.98%
1982	556	+0.99%
1990	514	−0.98%
1999	497	−0.37%
2007	570	+1.73%
2012	553	−0.60%
2017	552	−0.04%
2023	509	−1.34%
Source: INSEE

== See also ==
- Communes of the Aisne department
