= Paul Girod =

French politician (1931–2021)

Mayor of Droizy
- In office 27 June 1958 – 28 September 2021

Member of the Senate of France
- In office 7 May 1978 – 30 September 2008
- Preceded by: Jacques Pelletier
- Succeeded by: Antoine Lefèvre
- Constituency: Aisne

President of the Departmental Council of Aisne
- In office 3 October 1988 – 27 March 1998
- Preceded by: Charles Brazier
- Succeeded by: Jean-Pierre Balligand

Personal details
- Born: 27 June 1931 Boulogne-Billancourt, France
- Died: 28 September 2021 (aged 90) Droizy, France
- Party: MRP; CD; CDS; UDF; FD; UMP; LR

Paul Girod (27 June 1931 – 28 September 2021) was a French politician.

== Biography ==
After studying engineering, Girod took over his uncle's farm in Aisne. He was elected mayor of Droizy in 1958 and served until his death. In 1988, he was elected to serve the Canton of Oulchy-le-Château in the Departmental Council of Aisne, of which he served as President from 1988 to 1998. He also served as Vice-President of the Regional Council of Picardy from 1985 to 1988.

On 7 May 1978, Girod was appointed to the Senate following the appointment of Jacques Pelletier to the cabinet of Prime Minister Raymond Barre. He was re-elected in 1980, 1989, and 1998. He served as Vice-President of the Senate from 1995 to 2001. He was also a member of the Parliamentary Office for the Evaluation of Scientific and Technological Choices. He retired from the Senate in 2008.

On 6 November 2007, Girod was among the guests invited to the state dinner hosted by U.S. President George W. Bush in honor of President Nicolas Sarkozy at the White House.

Girod died in Droizy on 28 September 2021. At the time of his death, he was the longest-serving mayor in France and the last living mayor to have served under the Fourth Republic, having been in office for 63 years.
