= Canton of Braine =

Coordinates: 49°20′30″N 3°31′55″E

Braine
- Former canton
- Interactive map of Braine
- Country: France
- Region: Hauts-de-France
- Department: Aisne
- No. of communes: {{{nbcomm}}}
- Disbanded: 2015
- Area: 257.46 km^{2} (99.41 sq mi)
- Population (2012): 11,759
  - Density: 45.673/km^{2} (118.29/sq mi)

The canton of Braine is a former administrative division in northern France. It was disbanded following the French canton reorganisation which came into effect in March 2015. It had 11,759 inhabitants (2012).

The canton comprised the following communes:

- Acy
- Augy
- Bazoches-sur-Vesles
- Blanzy-lès-Fismes
- Braine
- Brenelle
- Bruys
- Cerseuil
- Chassemy
- Chéry-Chartreuve
- Ciry-Salsogne
- Courcelles-sur-Vesles
- Couvrelles
- Cys-la-Commune
- Dhuizel
- Glennes
- Jouaignes
- Lesges
- Lhuys
- Limé
- Longueval-Barbonval
- Merval
- Mont-Notre-Dame
- Mont-Saint-Martin
- Paars
- Perles
- Presles-et-Boves
- Quincy-sous-le-Mont
- Révillon
- Saint-Mard
- Saint-Thibaut
- Serches
- Sermoise
- Serval
- Tannières
- Vasseny
- Vauxcéré
- Vauxtin
- Viel-Arcy
- Villers-en-Prayères
- Ville-Savoye

== Demographics ==
Historical population Canton of Braine
| Year | 1962 | 1968 | 1975 | 1982 | 1990 | 1999 |
| Pop. | 8,984 | 9,727 | 9,445 | 9,338 | 9,873 | 10,228 |
| ±% | — | +8.3% | −2.9% | −1.1% | +5.7% | +3.6% |
From the year 1962 on: No double counting – residents of multiple communes (e.g. students and military personnel) are counted only once. Source: INSEE

== See also ==
- Cantons of the Aisne department
