= Longueval-Barbonval =

- Part of Les Septvallons
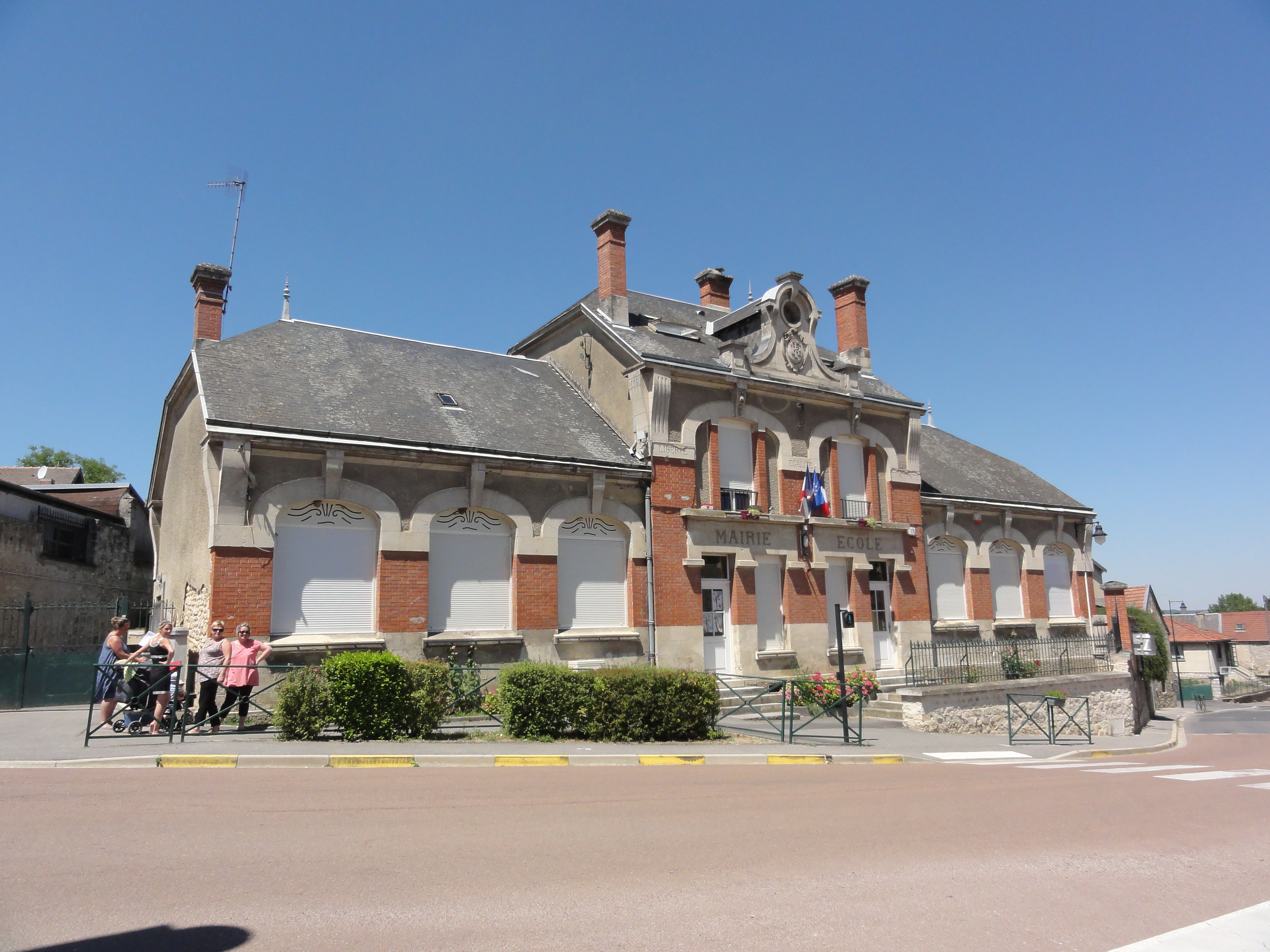
- Town hall
- Location of Longueval-Barbonval
- Location within France Location within Hauts-de-France
- Coordinates: 49°21′36″N 3°39′12″E
- Country: France
- Region: Hauts-de-France
- Department: Aisne
- Arrondissement: Soissons
- Canton: Braine
- Commune: Les Septvallons
- Area^{1}: 8.73 km^{2} (3.37 sq mi)
- Elevation: 90 m (300 ft)
- Highest elevation: 180 m (590 ft)
- Lowest elevation: 58 m (190 ft)
- Population (2021): 494
  - Density: 56.6/km^{2} (147/sq mi)
- Time zone: UTC+01:00 (CET)
  - Summer (DST): UTC+02:00 (CEST)
- Postal code: 02160
- ^{1} French Land Register data, which excludes lakes, ponds, glaciers > 1 km^{2} (0.386 sq mi or 247 acres) and river estuaries.

Longueval-Barbonval (French pronunciation: [lɔ̃ɡval baʁbɔ̃val]) is a former commune in the department of Aisne in northern France. On 1 January 2016, it was merged into the new commune Les Septvallons.

== See also ==
- Communes of the Aisne department
