= Arrondissements of the Aisne department =

Administrative divisions of Aisne, France

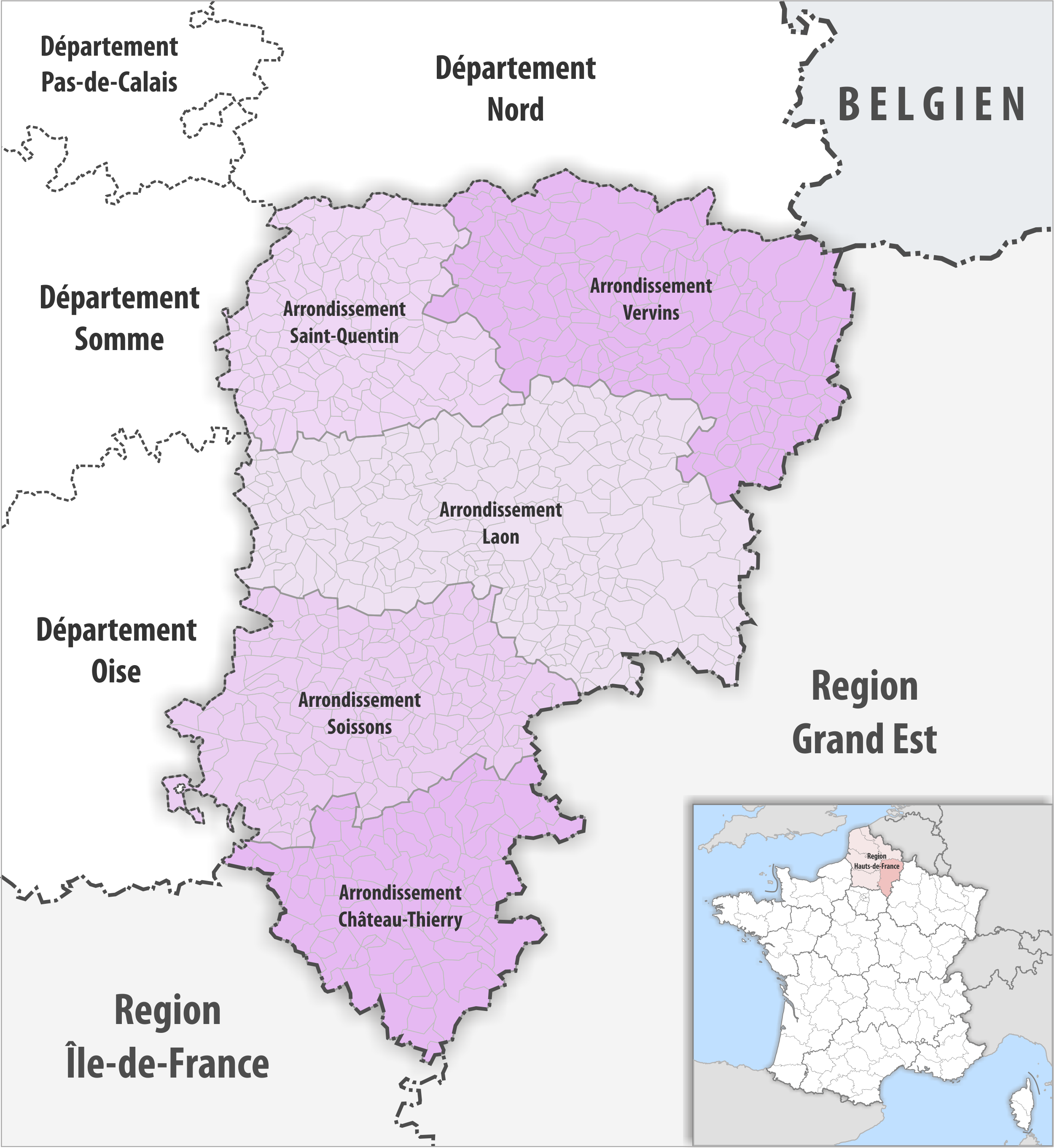
Map of arrondissements of the Aisne department.

The 5 arrondissements of the Aisne department are:

1. Arrondissement of Château-Thierry, (subprefecture: Château-Thierry) with 108 communes. The population of the arrondissement was 69,781 in 2021.
2. Arrondissement of Laon, (prefecture of the Aisne department: Laon) with 240 communes. The population of the arrondissement was 154,021 in 2021.
3. Arrondissement of Saint-Quentin, (subprefecture: Saint-Quentin) with 126 communes. The population of the arrondissement was 126,366 in 2021.
4. Arrondissement of Soissons, (subprefecture: Soissons) with 164 communes. The population of the arrondissement was 107,344 in 2021.
5. Arrondissement of Vervins, (subprefecture: Vervins) with 160 communes. The population of the arrondissement was 69,956 in 2021.

== History ==
In 1800 the arrondissements of Laon, Château-Thierry, Saint-Quentin, Soissons and Vervins were established. The arrondissement of Château-Thierry was disbanded in 1926, and restored in 1942.

The borders of the arrondissements of Aisne were modified in January 2017:

- 10 communes from the arrondissement of Château-Thierry to the arrondissement of Soissons
- three communes from the arrondissement of Laon to the arrondissement of Soissons
- 30 communes from the arrondissement of Laon to the arrondissement of Vervins
