= Vauxcéré =

- Part of Les Septvallons
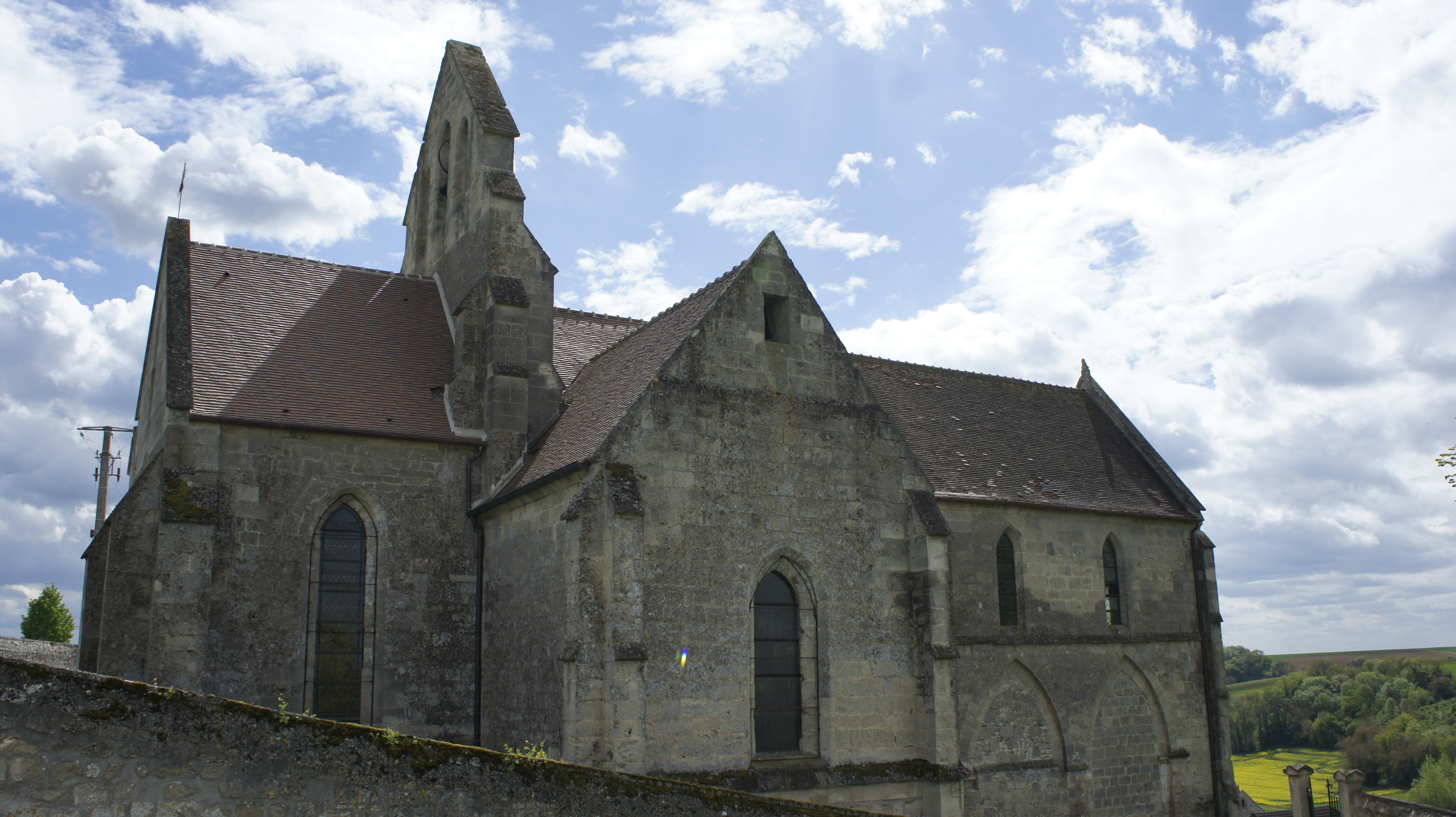
- Church
- Location of Vauxcéré
- Location within France Location within Hauts-de-France
- Coordinates: 49°20′32″N 3°38′11″E
- Country: France
- Region: Hauts-de-France
- Department: Aisne
- Arrondissement: Soissons
- Canton: Braine
- Commune: Les Septvallons
- Area^{1}: 5.8 km^{2} (2.2 sq mi)
- Elevation: 150 m (490 ft)
- Highest elevation: 182 m (597 ft)
- Lowest elevation: 65 m (213 ft)
- Population (2021): 87
  - Density: 15/km^{2} (39/sq mi)
- Time zone: UTC+01:00 (CET)
  - Summer (DST): UTC+02:00 (CEST)
- Postal code: 02160
- ^{1} French Land Register data, which excludes lakes, ponds, glaciers > 1 km^{2} (0.386 sq mi or 247 acres) and river estuaries.

Vauxcéré (French pronunciation: [voseʁe]) is a former commune in the department of Aisne in northern France. On 1 January 2016, it was merged into the new commune Les Septvallons.

== See also ==
- Communes of the Aisne department
