= Droizy =

- Commune
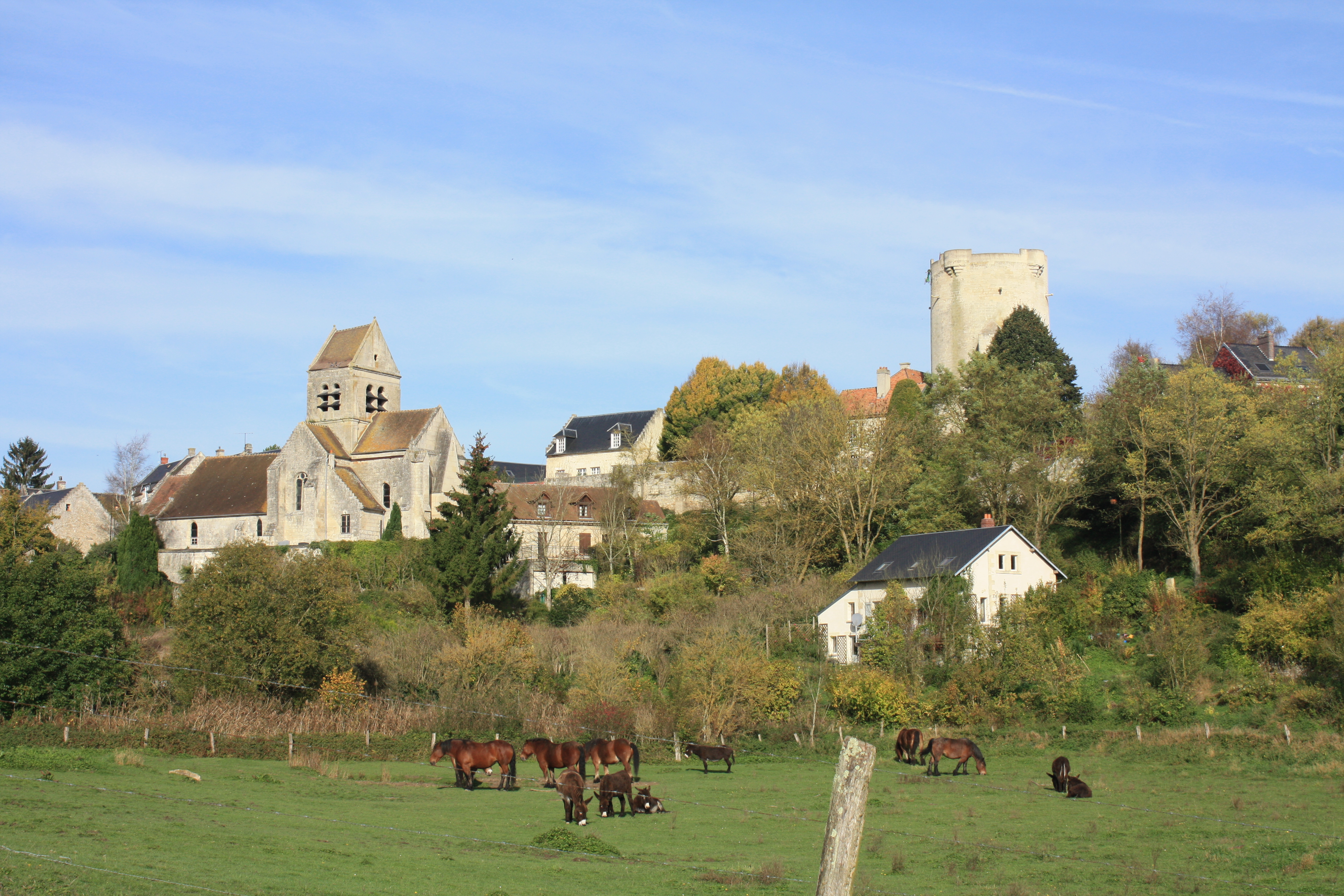
- The village of Droizy
- Location of Droizy
- Location within France Location within Hauts-de-France
- Coordinates: 49°16′41″N 3°23′36″E
- Country: France
- Region: Hauts-de-France
- Department: Aisne
- Arrondissement: Soissons
- Canton: Villers-Cotterêts
- Intercommunality: Oulchy le Château

Government
  - Mayor (2026–32): Thierry Ardito
- Area^{1}: 5.42 km^{2} (2.09 sq mi)
- Elevation: 136 m (446 ft)
- Highest elevation: 172 m (564 ft)
- Lowest elevation: 88 m (289 ft)
- Population (2023): 75
  - Density: 14/km^{2} (36/sq mi)
- Time zone: UTC+01:00 (CET)
  - Summer (DST): UTC+02:00 (CEST)
- INSEE/Postal code: 02272 /02210
- ^{1} French Land Register data, which excludes lakes, ponds, glaciers > 1 km^{2} (0.386 sq mi or 247 acres) and river estuaries.

Droizy (French pronunciation: [dʁwazi]) is a commune in the Aisne department in Hauts-de-France in northern France, near Soissons. It was the site of the Battle of Droizy in 593. Paul Girod, mayor of Droizy from 1958 until his death in 2021, was the longest-serving mayor in France, having been in office for 63 years.

== Population ==
Historical population
Year	Pop.	±% p.a.
1968	85	—
1975	87	+0.33%
1982	66	−3.87%
1990	66	+0.00%
1999	79	+2.02%
2007	77	−0.32%
2012	72	−1.33%
2017	75	+0.82%
2023	75	+0.00%
Source: INSEE

== See also ==
- Communes of the Aisne department
