= Les Septvallons =

- Commune
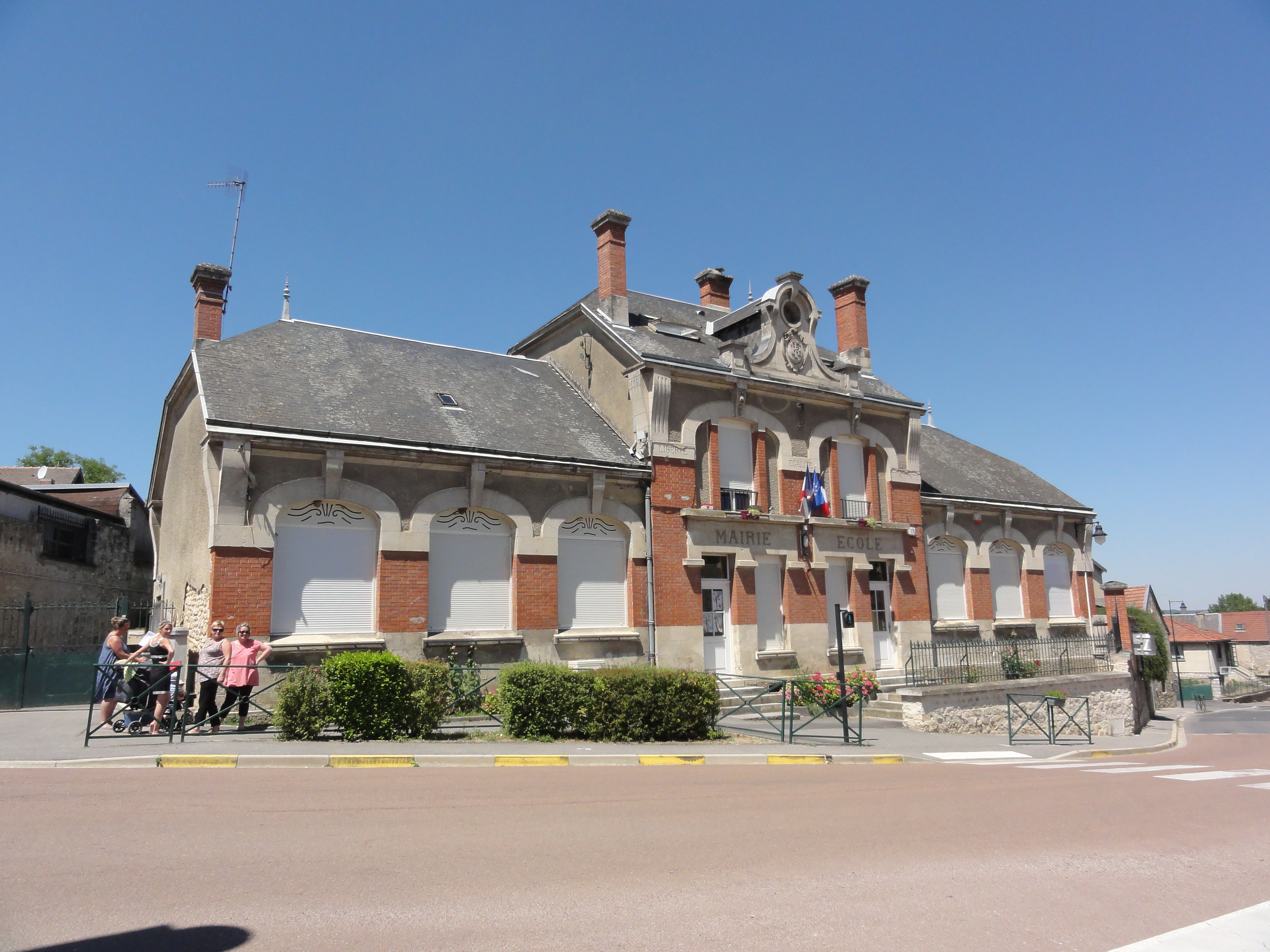
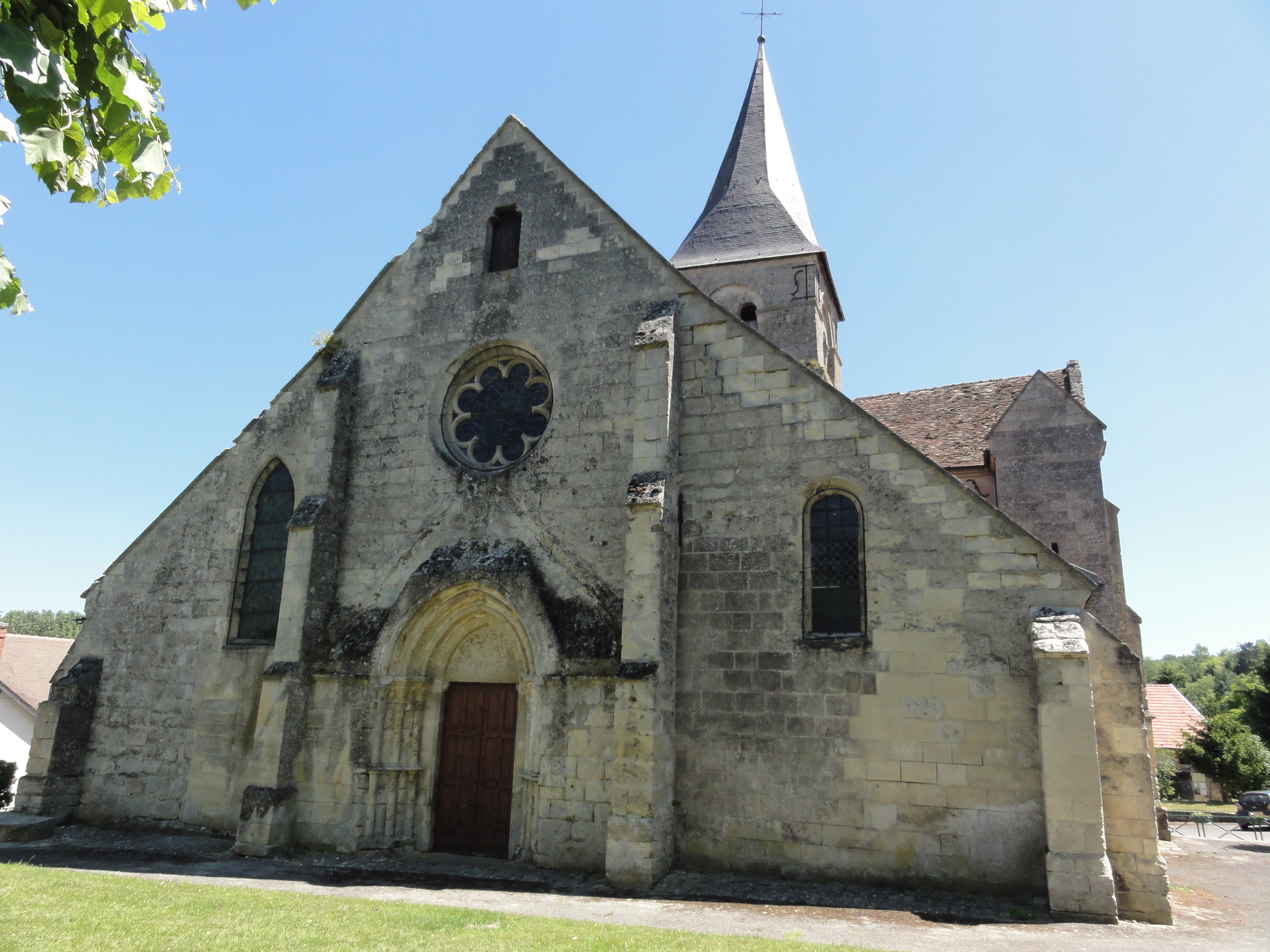
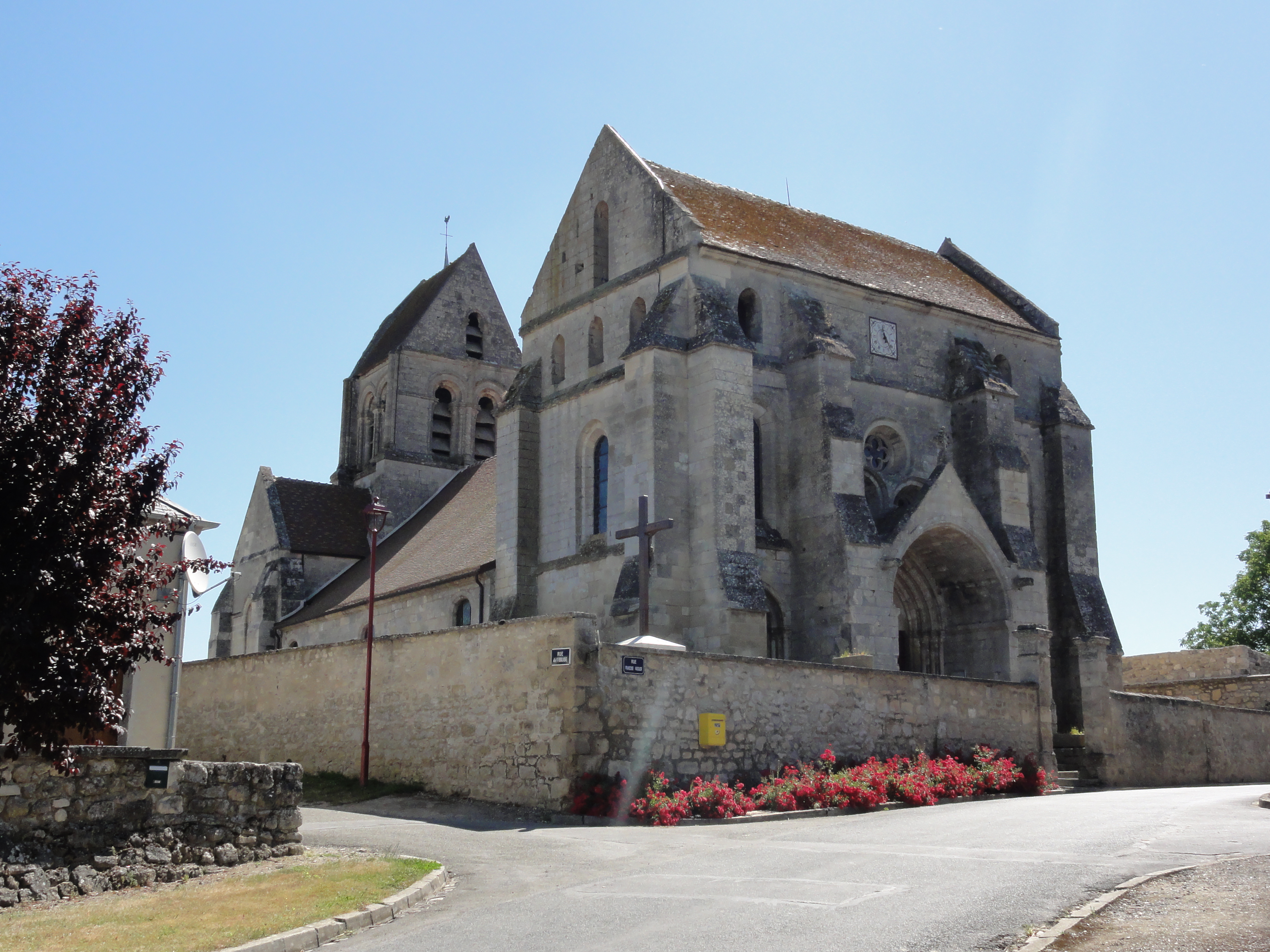
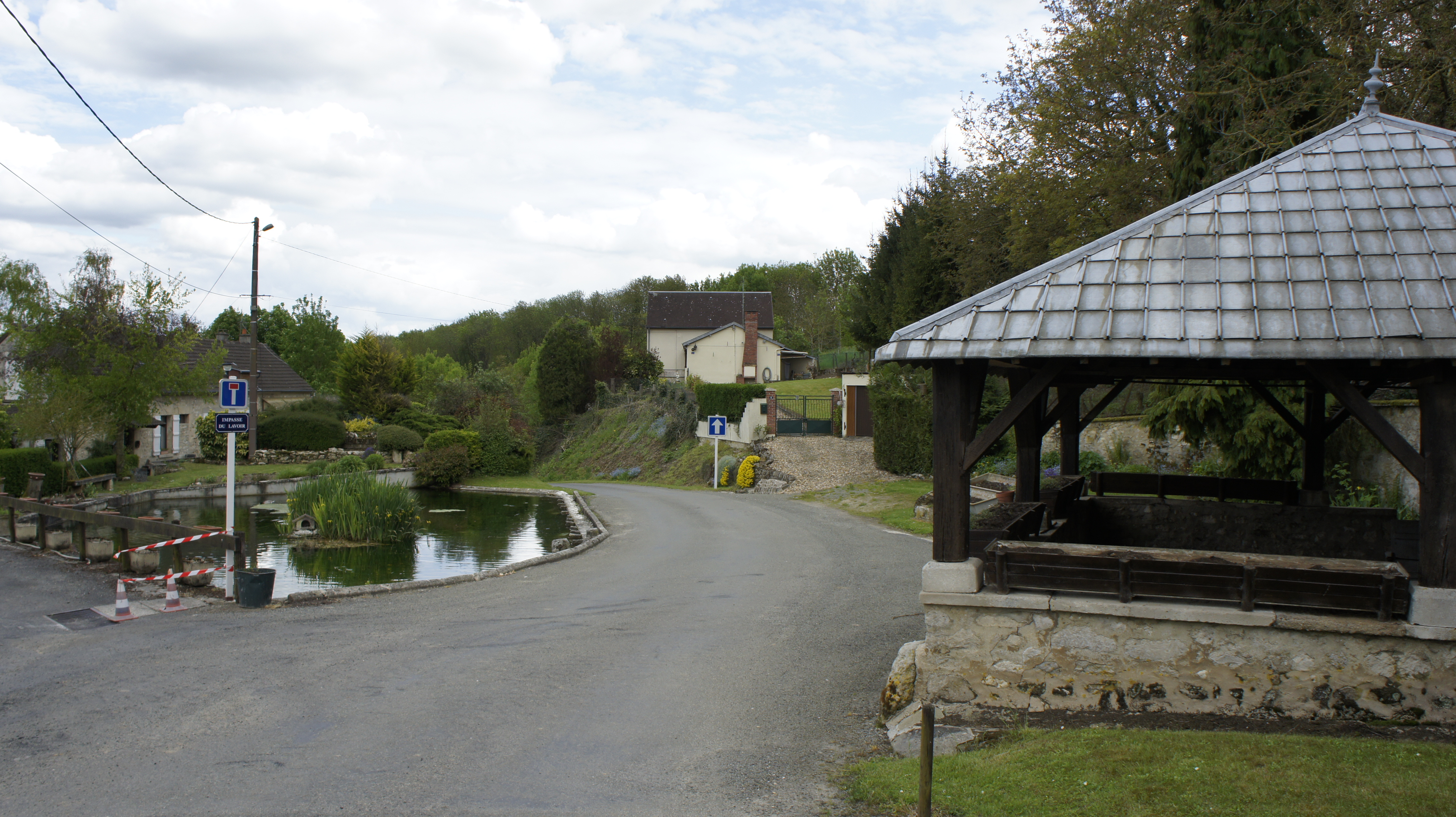
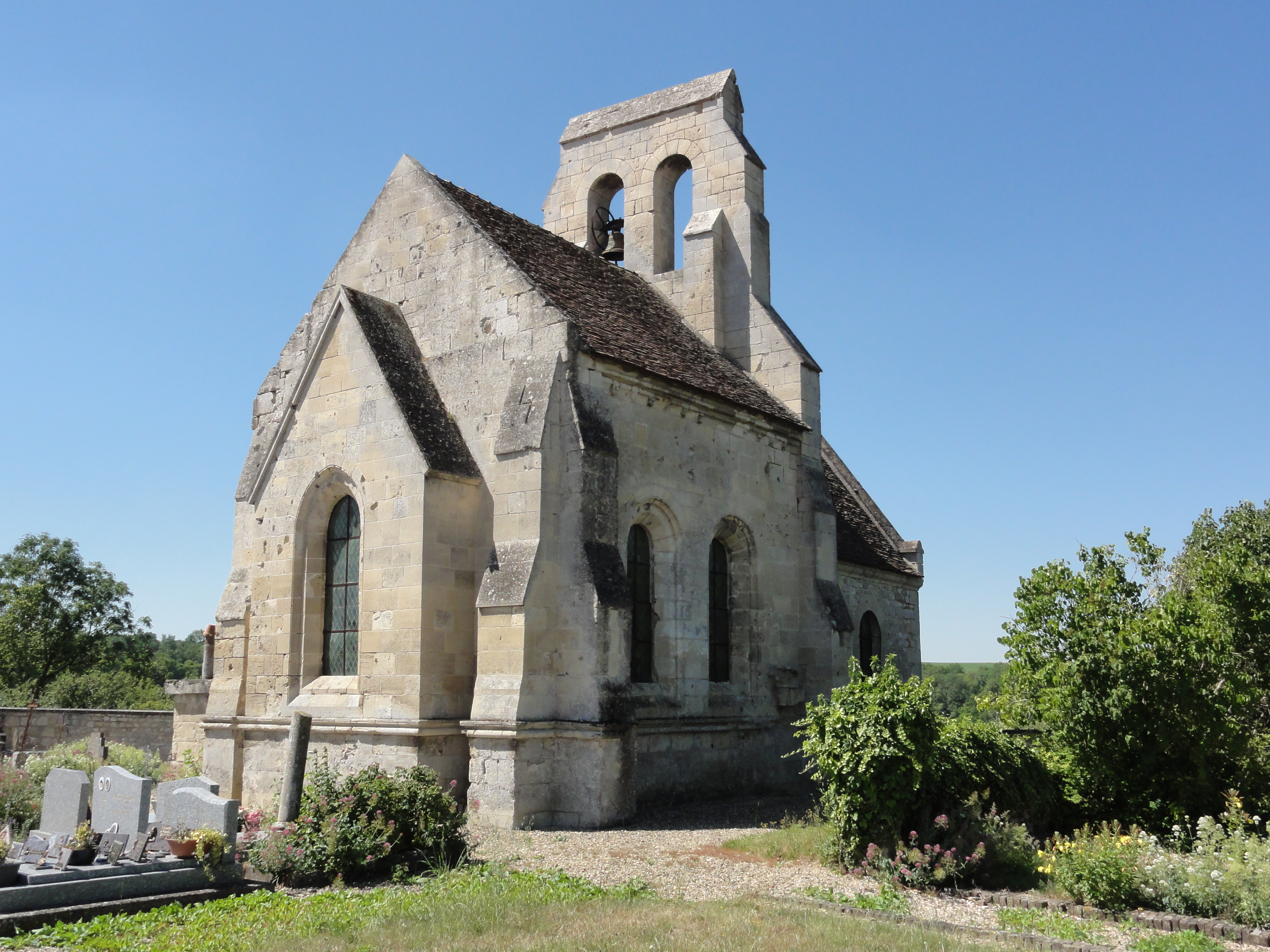
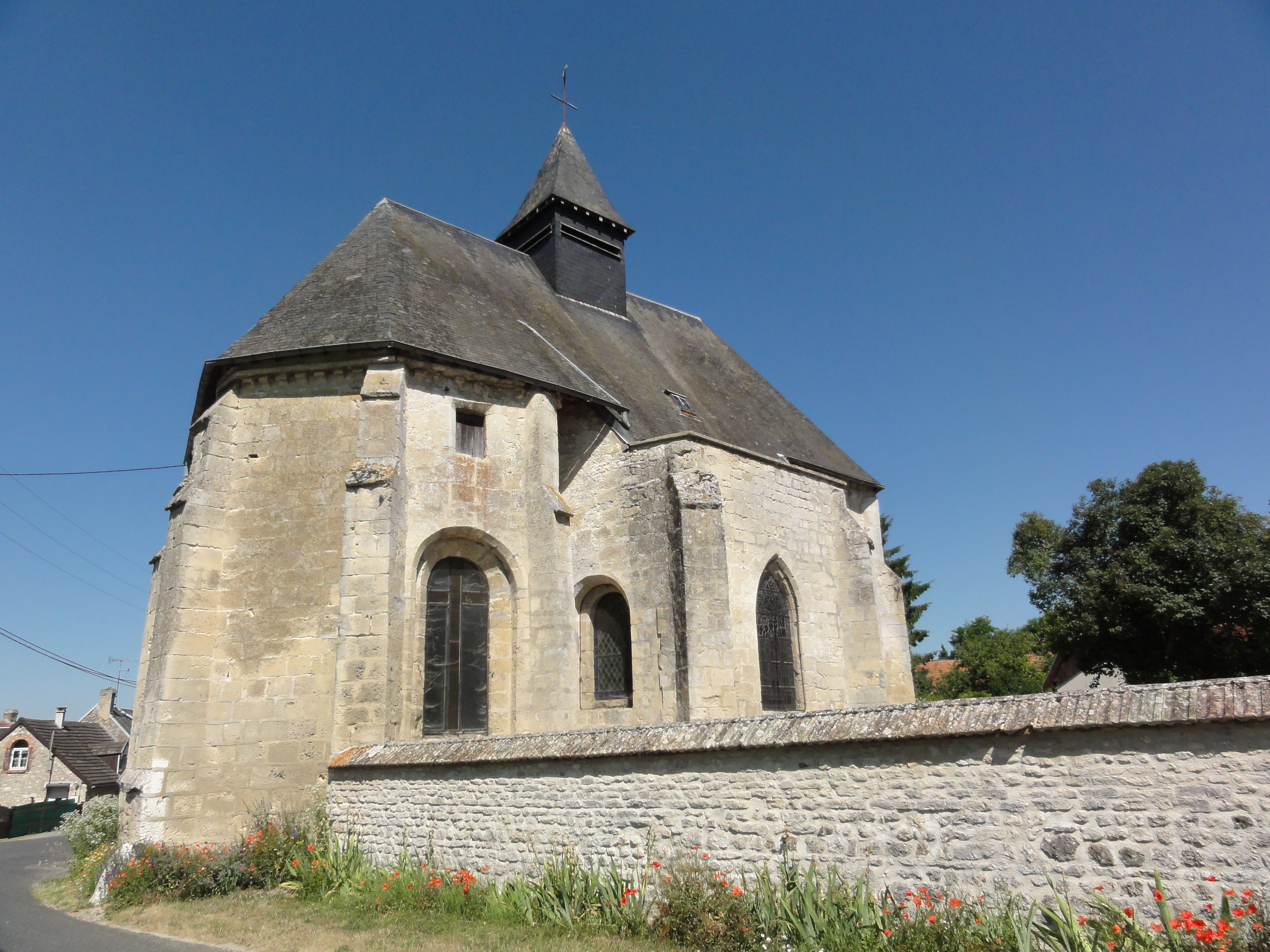
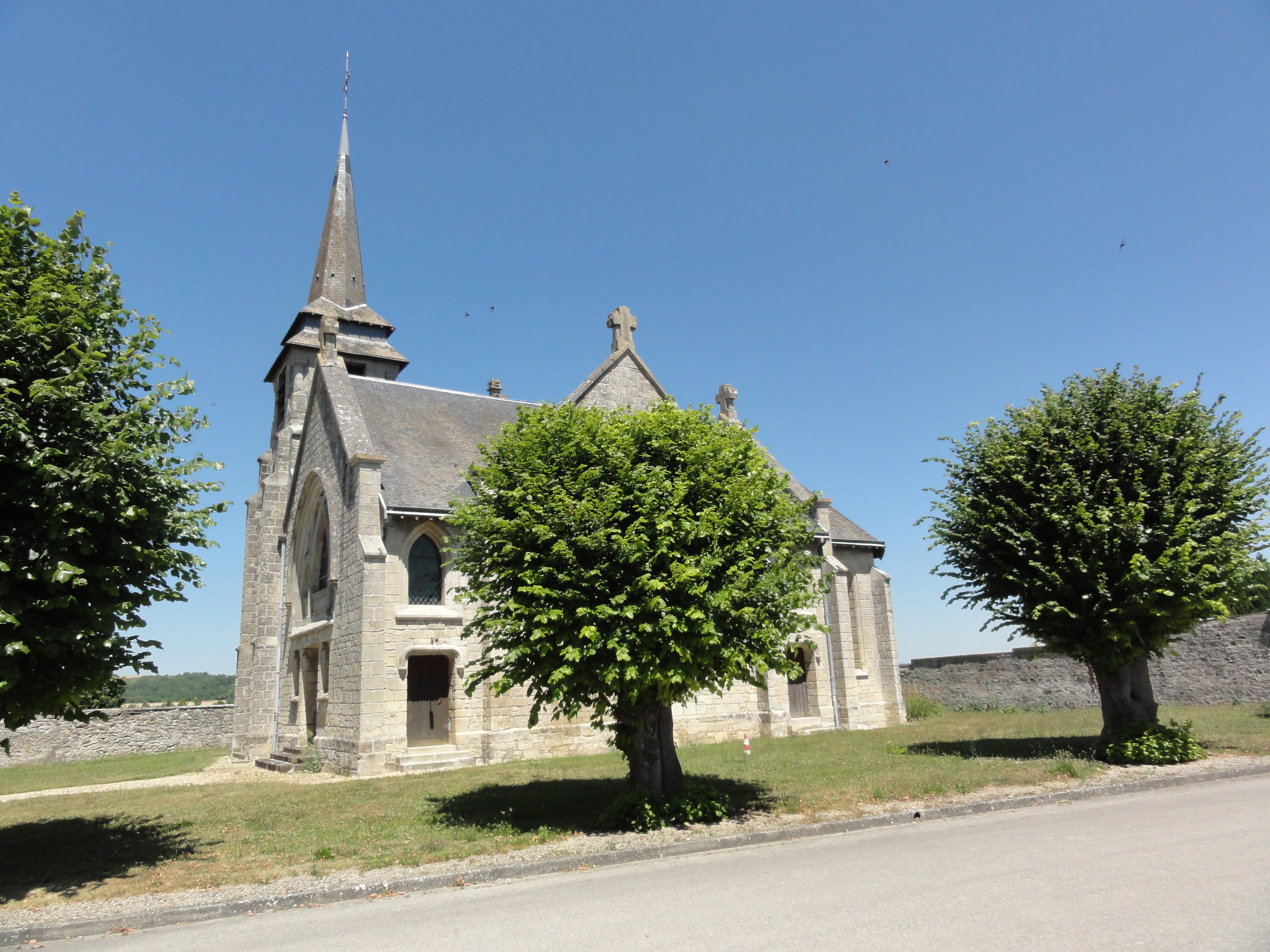
- From top to bottom, from left to right: The town hall of Les Septvallons; the church of Longueval in Longueval-Barbonval; the church of Glennes; a view of the village of Perles; the church of Merval; the church of Révillon; the church of Villers-en-Prayères.
- Location of Les Septvallons
- Location within France Location within Hauts-de-France
- Coordinates: 49°21′32″N 3°39′14″E
- Country: France
- Region: Hauts-de-France
- Department: Aisne
- Arrondissement: Soissons
- Canton: Fère-en-Tardenois
- Intercommunality: CC du Val de l'Aisne

Government
  - Mayor (2020–2026): Alain Colpart
- Area^{1}: 38.14 km^{2} (14.73 sq mi)
- Population (2023): 1,232
  - Density: 32.30/km^{2} (83.66/sq mi)
- Time zone: UTC+01:00 (CET)
  - Summer (DST): UTC+02:00 (CEST)
- INSEE/Postal code: 02439 /02160
- ^{1} French Land Register data, which excludes lakes, ponds, glaciers > 1 km^{2} (0.386 sq mi or 247 acres) and river estuaries.

Les Septvallons (French pronunciation: [le sɛtvalɔ̃]) is a commune in the Aisne department of northern France. The municipality was established on 1 January 2016 and consists of the former communes of Glennes, Longueval-Barbonval, Merval, Perles, Révillon, Vauxcéré and Villers-en-Prayères.

== See also ==
- Communes of the Aisne department
