= Glennes =

- Part of Les Septvallons
- Location of Glennes
- Location within France Location within Hauts-de-France
- Coordinates: 49°21′21″N 3°42′52″E
- Country: France
- Region: Hauts-de-France
- Department: Aisne
- Arrondissement: Soissons
- Canton: Braine
- Commune: Les Septvallons
- Area^{1}: 8.57 km^{2} (3.31 sq mi)
- Elevation: 150 m (490 ft)
- Highest elevation: 193 m (633 ft)
- Lowest elevation: 71 m (233 ft)
- Population (2021): 228
  - Density: 26.6/km^{2} (68.9/sq mi)
- Time zone: UTC+01:00 (CET)
  - Summer (DST): UTC+02:00 (CEST)
- Postal code: 02160
- ^{1} French Land Register data, which excludes lakes, ponds, glaciers > 1 km^{2} (0.386 sq mi or 247 acres) and river estuaries.

Glennes (French pronunciation: [ɡlɛn]) is a former commune in the department of Aisne in northern France. On 1 January 2016, it was merged into the new commune Les Septvallons.

== See also ==
- Communes of the Aisne department
