= Guy de Lubersac =

- Born: 20 January 1878; Paris, France
- Died: 15 April 1932 (aged 54); Paris, France
- Education: Sciences Po
- Occupations: Landowner, politician

Louis Guy Marie Jean de Lubersac (1878-1932) was a French aristocrat, landowner and politician. He served as a member of French Senate from 1920 to 1932, representing Aisne.

== Early life ==
Guy de Lubersac was born on 20 January 1878 in Paris, France. He studied the Law and graduated from Sciences Po.

== Career ==
De Lubersac inherited the marquisate of Lubersac, including land in Aisne. He became a member of the Jockey-Club de Paris. He was elected as the mayor of Faverolles in 1904. He served in the French Army during World War I.

De Lubersac served as a member of French Senate from 1920 to 1932, representing Aisne.

== Death ==
De Lubersac died on 15 April 1932 in Paris, France.
