= Villers-en-Prayères =

- Part of Les Septvallons
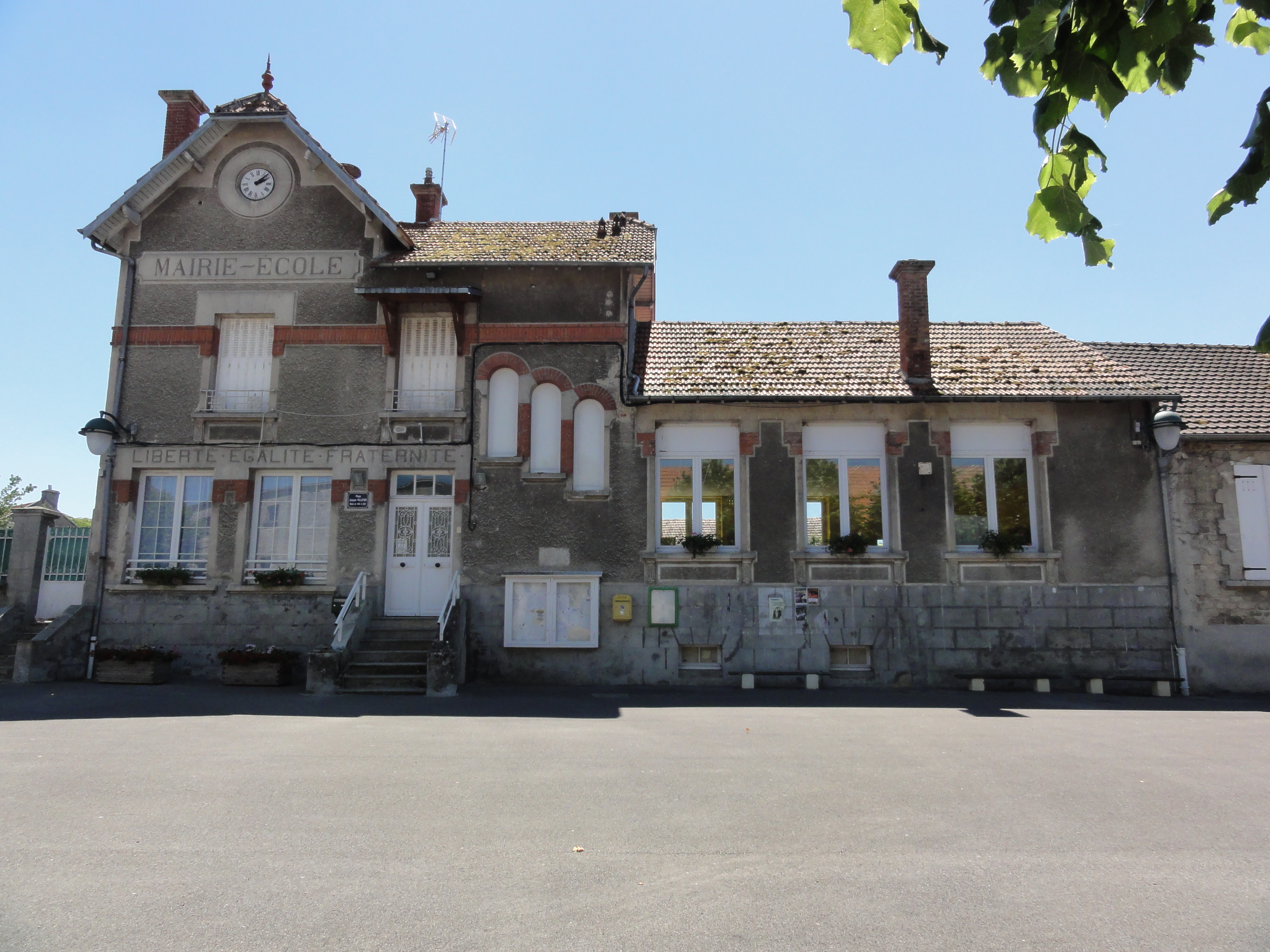
- Town hall arrondissement = Soissons
- Location of Villers-en-Prayères
- Location within France Location within Hauts-de-France
- Coordinates: 49°22′41″N 3°40′38″E
- Country: France
- Region: Hauts-de-France
- Department: Aisne
- Canton: Braine
- Commune: Les Septvallons
- Area^{1}: 5.74 km^{2} (2.22 sq mi)
- Elevation: 121 m (397 ft)
- Highest elevation: 144 m (472 ft)
- Lowest elevation: 43 m (141 ft)
- Population (2021): 124
  - Density: 21.6/km^{2} (56.0/sq mi)
- Time zone: UTC+01:00 (CET)
  - Summer (DST): UTC+02:00 (CEST)
- Postal code: 02160
- ^{1} French Land Register data, which excludes lakes, ponds, glaciers > 1 km^{2} (0.386 sq mi or 247 acres) and river estuaries.

Villers-en-Prayères (French pronunciation: [vilɛʁ ɑ̃ pʁɛjɛʁ]) is a former commune in the department of Aisne in northern France. On 1 January 2016, it was merged into the new commune Les Septvallons.

== See also ==
- Communes of the Aisne department
