= Departmental Council of Aisne =

Departmental legislature in France

Departmental Council of Aisne Conseil départemental de l'Aisne
- Logo of the Council

Leadership
- President: Nicolas Fricoteaux, UDI since 2 April 2015

Structure
- Seats: 42
- Political groups: LR - UDI - DVD (18); PS - EELV - DVG (10); RN (7); PCF - PRG (6); Non-inscrits (1)

Elections
- Last election: 27 June 2021

Meeting place
- Rue Paul Doumer, Laon

Website
- aisne.com

The Departmental Council of Aisne (French: Conseil départemental de l'Aisne) is the deliberative assembly of the Aisne department in the region of Hauts-de-France. It consists of 42 members (general councilors) from 21 cantons.

The President of the General Council is Nicolas Fricoteaux.

== Vice-Presidents ==
The President of the Departmental Council is assisted by 12 vice-presidents chosen from among the departmental advisers. Each of them has a delegation of authority.

List of vice-presidents of the Aisne Departmental Council (as of 2021)
Order	Name	Party	Canton (constituency)	Delegation
1st	Michèle Fuselier	DVG	Château-Thierry	Ecological transition and sustainable development
2nd	François Rampelberg	DVD	Fère-en-Tardenois	Rurality and territorial solidarity
3rd	Isabelle Létrillart	DVD	Soissons-2	Integration and employment, family and child protection
4th	Freddy Grzeziczak	DVD	Saint-Quentin-3	Housing
5th	Colette Blériot	DVD	Saint-Quentin-1	Sports
6th	Thomas Dudebout	LR	Saint-Quentin-2	Digital transition and strategy
7th	Isabelle Ittele	DVD	Marle	Colleges, youth and citizenship
8th	Pascal Tordeux	UCD	Soissons-1	Attractiveness and tourism
9th	Anne Maricot	DVG	Essômes-sur-Marne	Autonomy, elderly and people with disabilities
10th	Nicolas Reberot	DVD	Vic-sur-Aisne	Cultural action and heritage
11th	Jeanne Doyez Roussel	DVC	Villers-Cotterêts	General administration and budget
12th	Mathieu Fraise	DVC	Laon-1	Infrastructure

== See also ==
- Aisne
- Departmental councils of France
