= Jacques Pelletier =

French politician (1929–2007)

Mediator of the French Republic
- In office 5 March 1992 – 2 April 1998
- President: François Mitterrand; Jacques Chirac
- Preceded by: Paul Legatte
- Succeeded by: Bernard Stasi

Secretary of State for Education
- In office 3 April 1978 – 13 May 1981
- President: Valéry Giscard d'Estaing
- Prime Minister: Raymond Barre

Senator for Aisne
- In office 1 October 1998 – 3 September 2007

Personal details
- Born: 1 August 1929 Villers-en-Prayères, Aisne, France
- Died: 3 September 2007 (aged 78) Val-de-Grâce hospital, 5th arrondissement of Paris, France
- Party: Radical Party
- Education: Lycée Janson-de-Sailly

Jacques Pelletier (1 August 1929 in Villers-en-Prayères – 3 September 2007 in Val-de-Grâce hospital, Paris) was a French politician, who served as Senator of Aisne four times: first from 1966 to 1978, second from 1980 to 1988, a month in 1989, and finally from 1998 to 2007. He also served as French Ombudsman (Médiateur de la République) from 1992 to 1998. In 1996, he was made Knight of the National Order of the Legion of Honor.
