= Révillon =

Former French commune

- Part of Les Septvallons
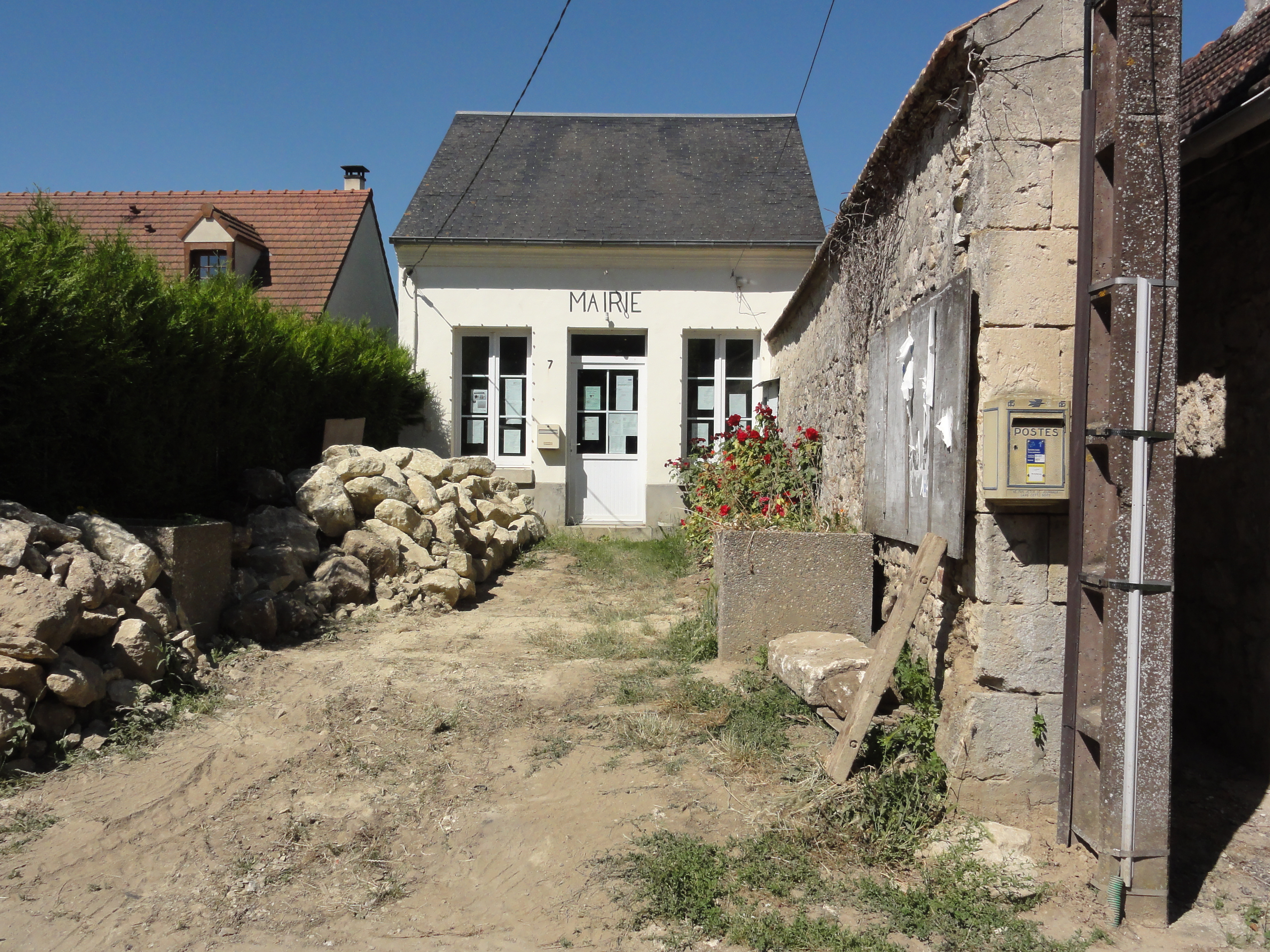
- Town hall

- Coat of arms
- Location of Révillon
- Location within France Location within Hauts-de-France
- Coordinates: 49°22′01″N 3°42′05″E
- Country: France
- Region: Hauts-de-France
- Department: Aisne
- Arrondissement: Soissons
- Canton: Fère-en-Tardenois
- Commune: Les Septvallons
- Area^{1}: 2.24 km^{2} (0.86 sq mi)
- Elevation: 67 m (220 ft)
- Highest elevation: 159 m (522 ft)
- Lowest elevation: 55 m (180 ft)
- Population (2021): 66
  - Density: 29/km^{2} (76/sq mi)
- Time zone: UTC+01:00 (CET)
  - Summer (DST): UTC+02:00 (CEST)
- Postal code: 02160
- ^{1} French Land Register data, which excludes lakes, ponds, glaciers > 1 km^{2} (0.386 sq mi or 247 acres) and river estuaries.

Révillon (French pronunciation: [ʁevijɔ̃]) is a former commune in the department of Aisne in northern France. On 1 January 2016, it was merged into the new commune Les Septvallons.

== See also ==
- Communes of the Aisne department
