= Fontaine-lès-Vervins =

- Commune
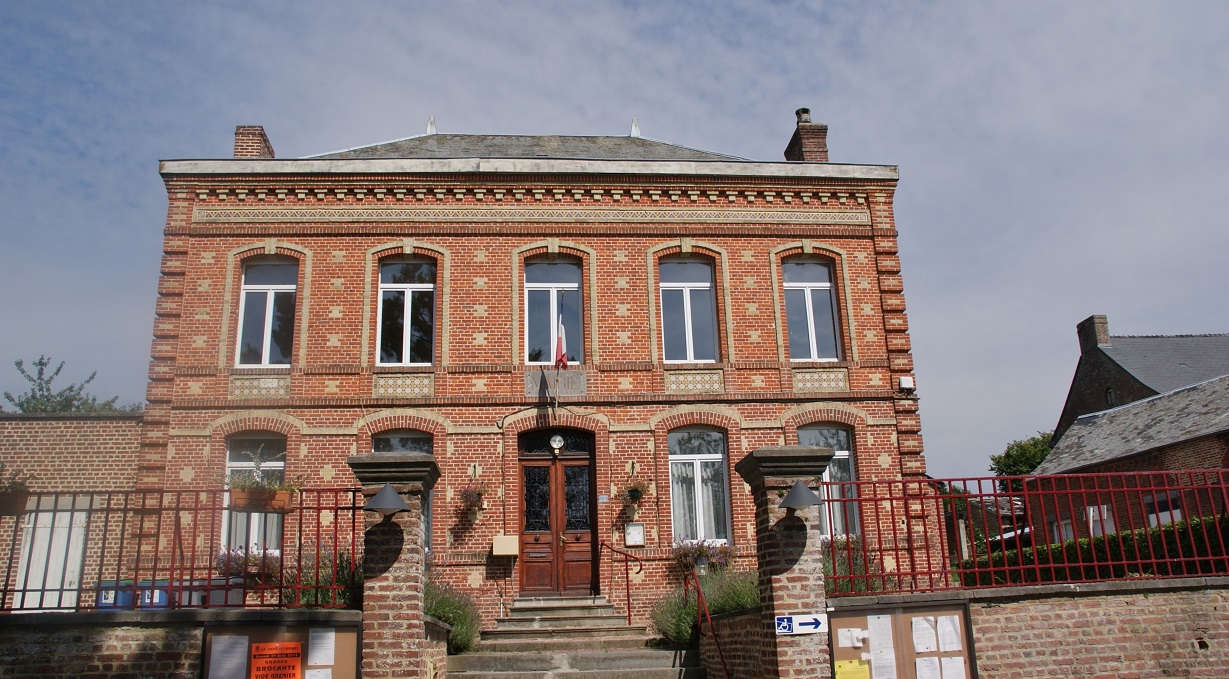
- The town hall of Fontaine-lès-Vervins
- Location of Fontaine-lès-Vervins
- Location within France Location within Hauts-de-France
- Coordinates: 49°51′15″N 3°54′09″E
- Country: France
- Region: Hauts-de-France
- Department: Aisne
- Arrondissement: Vervins
- Canton: Vervins
- Intercommunality: Thiérache du Centre

Government
  - Mayor (2026–32): Damien Quentin
- Area^{1}: 19.74 km^{2} (7.62 sq mi)
- Elevation: 184 m (604 ft)
- Highest elevation: 215 m (705 ft)
- Lowest elevation: 123 m (404 ft)
- Population (2023): 862
  - Density: 43.7/km^{2} (113/sq mi)
- Time zone: UTC+01:00 (CET)
  - Summer (DST): UTC+02:00 (CEST)
- INSEE/Postal code: 02321 /02140
- ^{1} French Land Register data, which excludes lakes, ponds, glaciers > 1 km^{2} (0.386 sq mi or 247 acres) and river estuaries.

Fontaine-lès-Vervins (French pronunciation: [fɔ̃tɛn lɛ vɛʁvɛ̃], literally Fontaine near Vervins) is a commune in the Aisne department in Hauts-de-France in northern France.

== Population ==
Historical population
| Year | Pop. | ±% p.a. |
|---|---|---|
| 1968 | 763 | — |
| 1975 | 753 | −0.19% |
| 1982 | 822 | +1.26% |
| 1990 | 838 | +0.24% |
| 1999 | 811 | −0.36% |
| 2007 | 934 | +1.78% |
| 2012 | 965 | +0.66% |
| 2017 | 913 | −1.10% |
| 2023 | 862 | −0.95% |
Source: INSEE

== See also ==
- Communes of the Aisne department
