= Battle of Droizy =

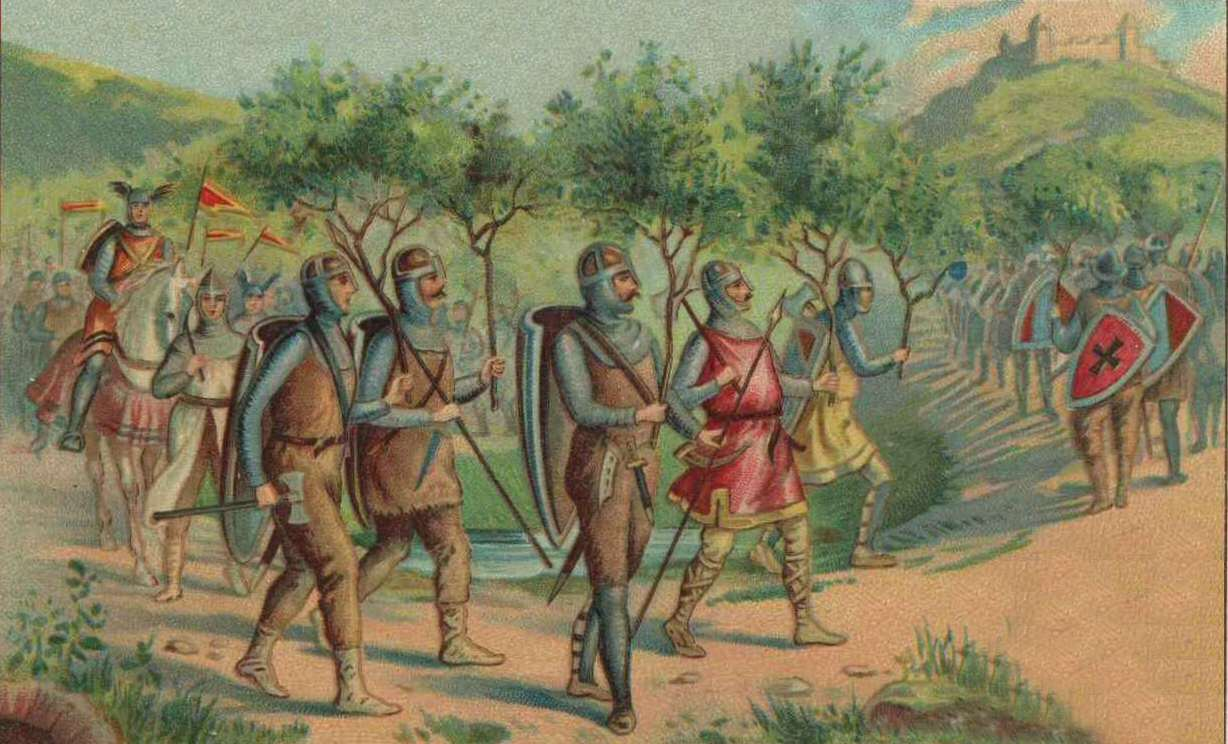
'The Great Birnam Wood' (Malcolm's army, camouflaged) on the attack, in Shakespeare's Macbeth

The Battle of Droizy (593 CE), fought outside of Soissons, was an action in the ongoing rivalry between the two Merovingian queens, Brunhilda of Austrasia and Fredegund.

In the battle, Fredegund deploys her inferior forces against Brunhilda using Roman military tactics: she chooses the field of battle; and she uses subterfuge. Outnumbered, Fredegund bade her men to carry tree branches to camouflage each other, and to fasten bells to their horses so the opponent would think they were their own grazing horses. Fredegund's forces prevailed, and Brunhilda's army was slaughtered.

The battle is the earliest documentation of 'moving woods' going to battle, which possibly inspired William Shakespeare's Macbeth.
