= Vervins =

- Subprefecture
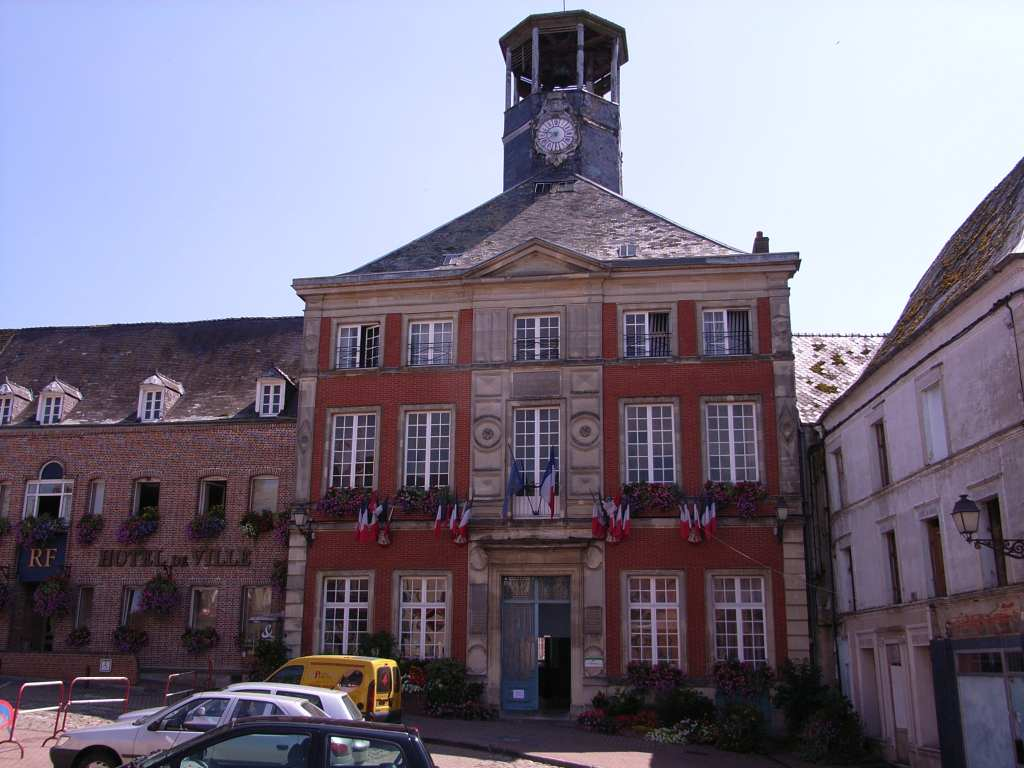
- Town hall

- Coat of arms
- Location of Vervins
- Location within France Location within Hauts-de-France
- Coordinates: 49°50′09″N 3°54′36″E
- Country: France
- Region: Hauts-de-France
- Department: Aisne
- Arrondissement: Vervins
- Canton: Vervins
- Intercommunality: Thiérache du Centre

Government
  - Mayor (2026–32): Jean-Marc Prince
- Area^{1}: 10.35 km^{2} (4.00 sq mi)
- Elevation: 147 m (482 ft)
- Highest elevation: 208 m (682 ft)
- Lowest elevation: 120 m (390 ft)
- Population (2023): 2,549
  - Density: 246.3/km^{2} (637.9/sq mi)
- Time zone: UTC+01:00 (CET)
  - Summer (DST): UTC+02:00 (CEST)
- INSEE/Postal code: 02789 /02140
- ^{1} French Land Register data, which excludes lakes, ponds, glaciers > 1 km^{2} (0.386 sq mi or 247 acres) and river estuaries.

Vervins (French pronunciation: [vɛʁvɛ̃]; Dutch: Wervin) is a commune in the Aisne department in Hauts-de-France in northern France. It is a subprefecture of the department. It lies between the small streams Vilpion and Chertemps, which drain towards the Serre. It is surrounded by the communes of Fontaine-lès-Vervins, La Bouteille, Landouzy-la-Cour, Thenailles, Hary, Gercy, and Voulpaix.

Vervins was mentioned as Verbinum in the 3rd century Antonine Itinerary. A Roman theatre has been excavated in the 1870s. The Peace of Vervins was signed here in 1598, ending a war between France and Spain.

== Population ==
Historical population

| Year | Pop. | ±% p.a. |
|---|---|---|
| 1793 | 3,100 | — |
| 1800 | 2,827 | −1.31% |
| 1806 | 2,872 | +0.26% |
| 1821 | 2,683 | −0.45% |
| 1831 | 2,555 | −0.49% |
| 1836 | 2,571 | +0.12% |
| 1841 | 2,677 | +0.81% |
| 1846 | 2,754 | +0.57% |
| 1851 | 2,704 | −0.37% |
| 1856 | 2,505 | −1.52% |
| 1861 | 2,519 | +0.11% |
| 1866 | 2,732 | +1.64% |
| 1872 | 2,934 | +1.20% |
| 1876 | 3,102 | +1.40% |
| 1881 | 3,202 | +0.64% |
| 1886 | 3,215 | +0.08% |
| 1891 | 3,233 | +0.11% |
| 1896 | 3,351 | +0.72% |
| 1901 | 3,298 | −0.32% |

| Year | Pop. | ±% p.a. |
|---|---|---|
| 1906 | 3,187 | −0.68% |
| 1911 | 3,206 | +0.12% |
| 1921 | 3,119 | −0.27% |
| 1926 | 3,151 | +0.20% |
| 1931 | 2,959 | −1.25% |
| 1936 | 2,903 | −0.38% |
| 1946 | 2,720 | −0.65% |
| 1954 | 2,731 | +0.05% |
| 1962 | 2,735 | +0.02% |
| 1968 | 2,833 | +0.59% |
| 1975 | 2,916 | +0.41% |
| 1982 | 2,721 | −0.98% |
| 1990 | 2,663 | −0.27% |
| 1999 | 2,653 | −0.04% |
| 2007 | 2,688 | +0.16% |
| 2012 | 2,561 | −0.96% |
| 2017 | 2,552 | −0.07% |
| 2023 | 2,549 | −0.02% |

Source: EHESS and INSEE (1968-2023)

== See also ==
- Communes of the Aisne department
