= Aisne =

Department of France

Aisne Ainne (Picard)
- Department
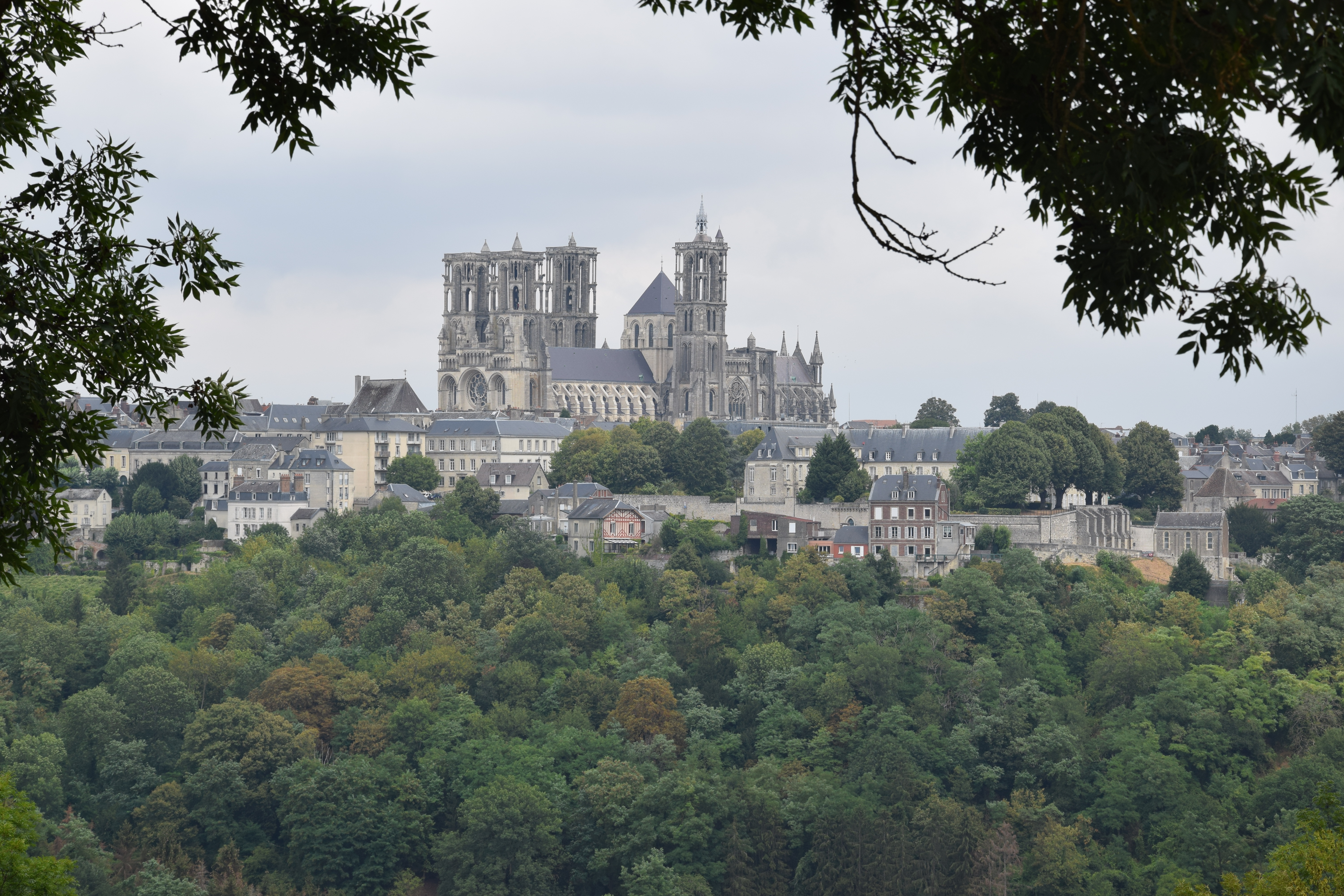
- Laon, capital city of the Aisne department

- Coat of arms

- Location of Aisne in France
- Coordinates: 49°30′N 3°30′E
- Country: France
- Region: Hauts-de-France
- Prefecture: Laon
- Subprefectures: Château-Thierry; Saint-Quentin; Soissons; Vervins

Government
  - President of the Departmental Council: Nicolas Fricoteaux (UDI)

Area^{1}
  - Total: 7,369 km^{2} (2,845 sq mi)

Population (2023)
  - Total: 523,342
  - Rank: 51st
  - Density: 71.02/km^{2} (183.9/sq mi)
- Time zone: UTC+1 (CET)
  - Summer (DST): UTC+2 (CEST)
- Department number: 02
- Arrondissements: 5
- Cantons: 21
- Communes: 797
- ^1 French Land Register data, which exclude estuaries, and lakes, ponds, and glaciers larger than 1 km^{2}

Aisne (/eɪn/ ayn, US also /ɛn/ en; French: [ɛːn]; Picard: Ainne) is a French department in the Hauts-de-France region of northern France. It is named after the river Aisne. In 2023, it had a population of 523,342.

== Geography ==
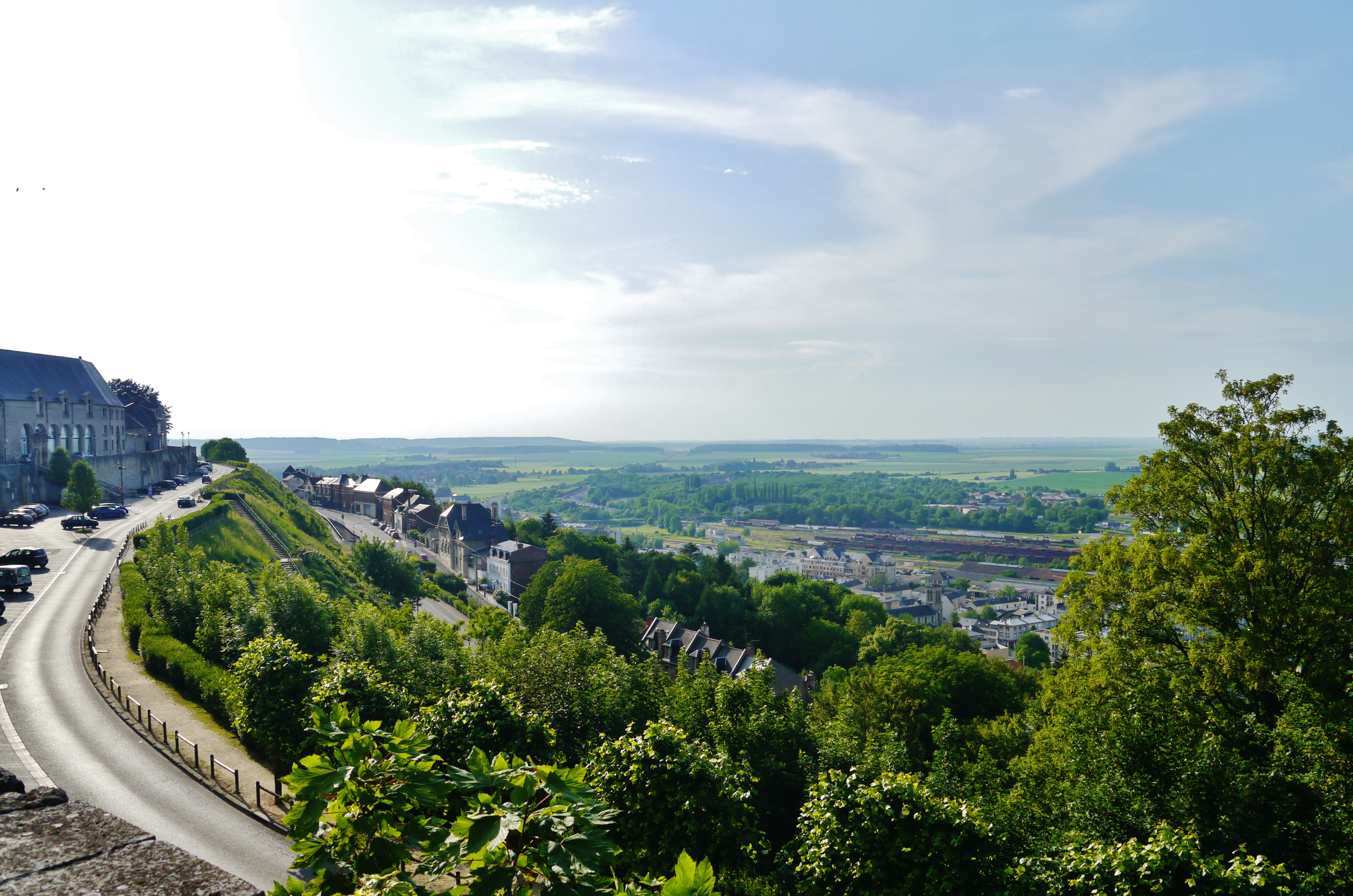
The Aisne department at Laon, 2018

The department borders Nord (to the north), Somme and Oise (to the west), Ardennes and Marne (east), and Seine-et-Marne (south-west) and Belgium (Province of Hainaut) (to the north-east). The river Aisne crosses the area from east to west, where it joins the Oise. The Marne forms part of the southern boundary of the department with the department of Seine-et-Marne. The southern part of the department is the geographical region known as la Brie poilleuse, a drier plateau known for its Brie cheese and other dairy products.

According to the 2003 census, the forested area of the department was 123,392 hectares, or 16.6%, for an average metropolitan area of 27.4%.

The landscape is dominated by masses of rock which often have steep flanks. These rocks appear all over the region, but the most impressive examples are at Laon and the Chemin des Dames ridge.

=== Principal towns ===
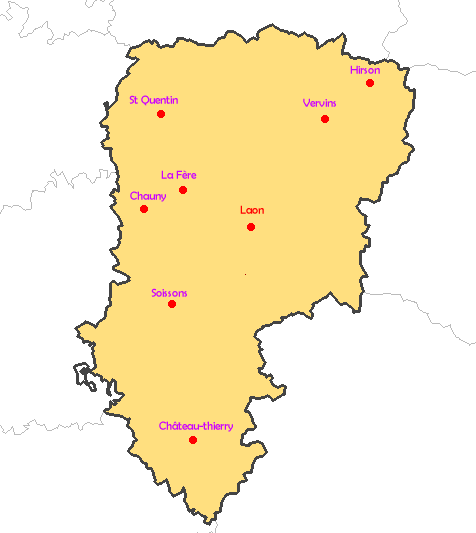
The main cities of the department

The department of Aisne includes one medium-sized city (Saint-Quentin) and three small cities (Laon, Soissons, and Château-Thierry), to which may be added the conglomeration formed by Chauny and Tergnier. There are many other agglomerations of an urban character because Aisne has been densely populated since before the 19th century. The villages are numerous and rather small. The most populous commune is Saint-Quentin; the prefecture Laon is the third-most populous. As of 2023, there are 7 communes with more than 10,000 inhabitants:

Commune	Population (2023)
Saint-Quentin	52,813
Soissons	28,046
Laon	24,220
Château-Thierry	15,097
Tergnier	13,045
Chauny	11,596
Villers-Cotterêts	10,489

See also: List of the communes of the Aisne department.

=== Hydrography ===
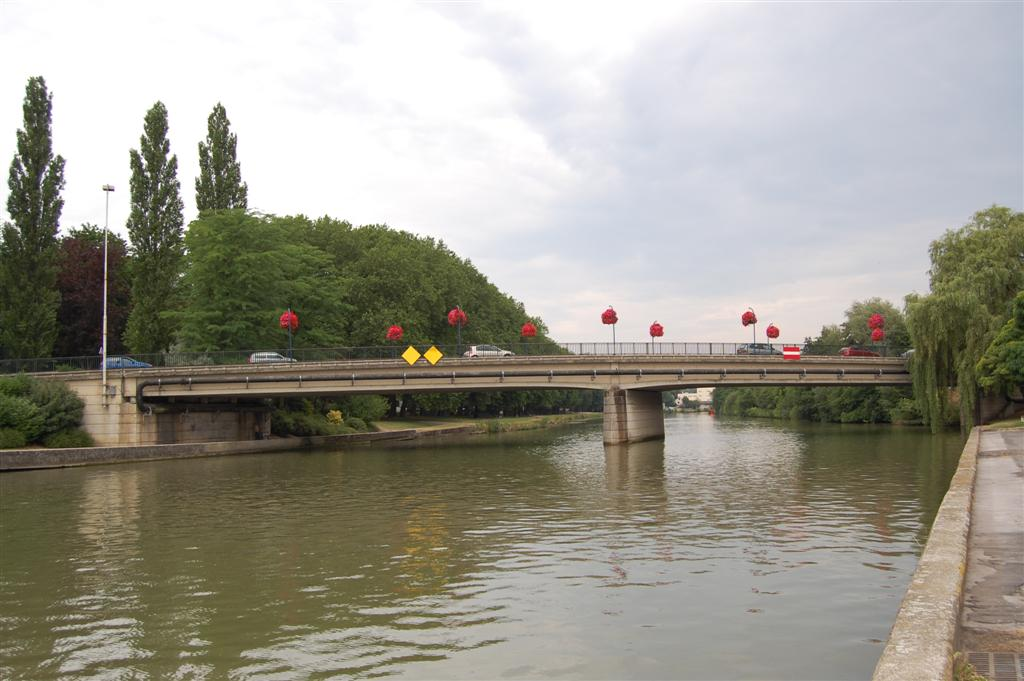
The Aisne river at Soissons, 2008

The Scheldt (which takes its source near Le Catelet), the Aisne, the Marne, the Ourcq, the Vesle, the Somme (which rises in Fonsommes), the Oise, and the Serre. In the south of the department, there is the Surmelin, the Verdonnelle, and the Dhuys (this river is channeled into the Dhuis Aqueduct, 131 km long, to supply drinking water to Paris since 1 October 1865 and also more recently the Leisure Park of Marne-la-Vallée).

The department is also crossed by numerous canals (e.g. the Canal of Saint-Quentin, 93 km).

=== Climate ===
There is an average of 500 to 750 mm precipitation annually.

Weather Data for Saint Quentin – Roupy

Climate data for Saint Quentin – Roupy from 1961 to 1990
Month	Jan	Feb	Mar	Apr	May	Jun	Jul	Aug	Sep	Oct	Nov	Dec	Year
Mean daily maximum °C (°F)	4.6 (40.3)	6.3 (43.3)	9.4 (48.9)	13 (55)	17 (63)	20.1 (68.2)	22.3 (72.1)	22.3 (72.1)	19.4 (66.9)	14.7 (58.5)	8.7 (47.7)	5.6 (42.1)	13.6 (56.5)
Daily mean °C (°F)	2.3 (36.1)	3.4 (38.1)	5.8 (42.4)	8.6 (47.5)	12.3 (54.1)	15.2 (59.4)	17.1 (62.8)	17.1 (62.8)	14.6 (58.3)	10.8 (51.4)	5.9 (42.6)	3.2 (37.8)	9.7 (49.5)
Mean daily minimum °C (°F)	0 (32)	0.4 (32.7)	2.2 (36.0)	4.2 (39.6)	7.6 (45.7)	10.3 (50.5)	11.9 (53.4)	11.8 (53.2)	9.8 (49.6)	7 (45)	3 (37)	0.9 (33.6)	5.8 (42.4)
Average precipitation mm (inches)	57.1 (2.25)	47.5 (1.87)	57.1 (2.25)	50.2 (1.98)	63 (2.5)	66.2 (2.61)	59.5 (2.34)	51.6 (2.03)	56.7 (2.23)	59.1 (2.33)	68.1 (2.68)	61.1 (2.41)	697.2 (27.45)
Source: Infoclimat: Saint Quentin – Roupy (1961–1990)

== Transport ==
=== Railways ===
The department is crossed by three railway lines from Paris: the first two from the Gare du Nord and the third from the Gare de l'Est:

- the line from Paris to Maubeuge, serving cities including Chauny, Tergnier and Saint-Quentin
- the line from Paris to Laon, serving cities including Soissons, Anizy-le-Château, and Laon (prefecture)
- the line from Paris to Strasbourg, serving the city of Château-Thierry

In 1873, the department of Aisne had 10 railway companies with a total length of 382 km.

== History ==
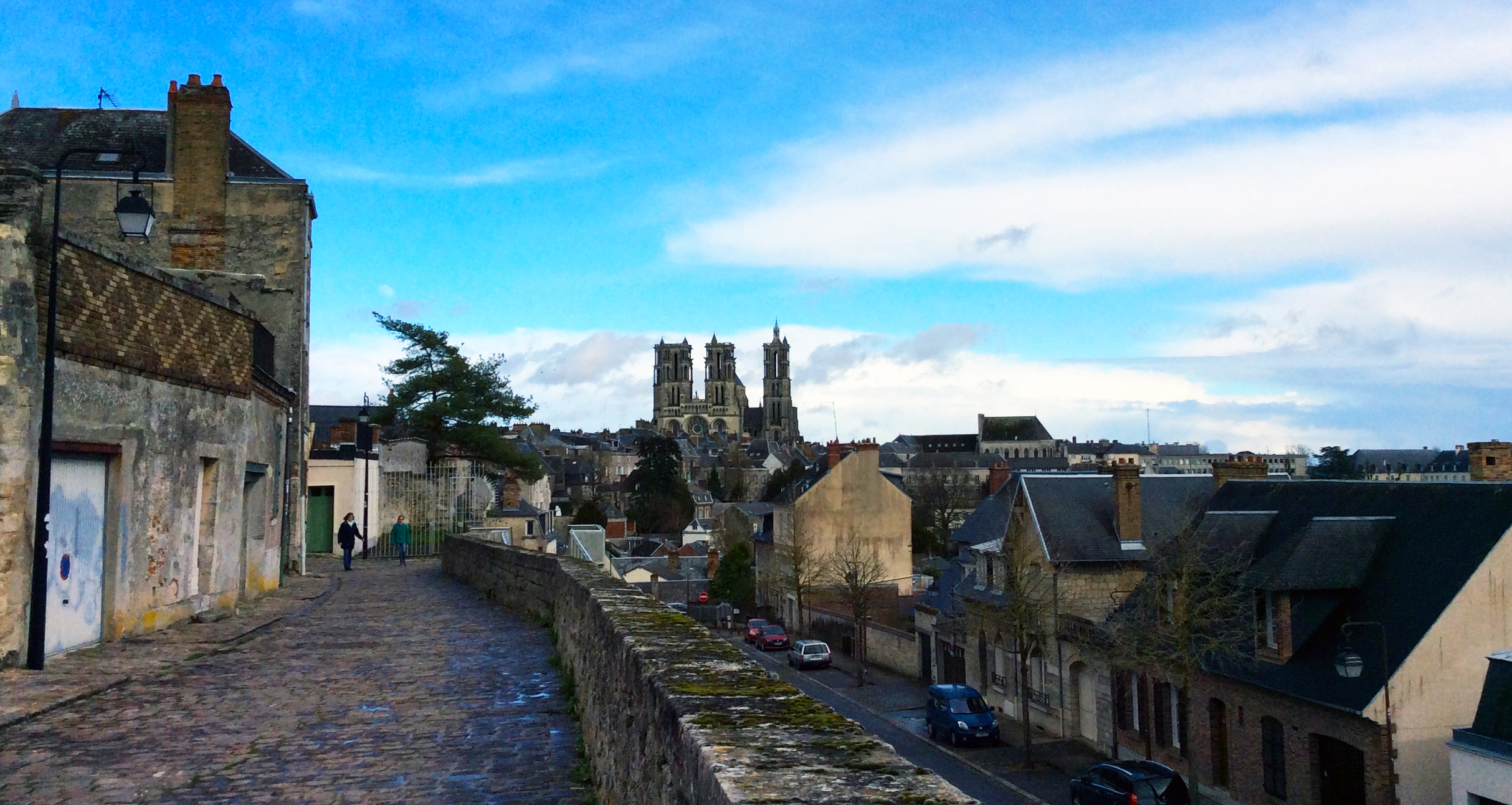
Laon and its cathedral, 2019

Aisne developed from the ancient settlement of Acinum, from which its name derives. The Battle of the Axona was fought nearby in 57 BC.

Department of Aisne in 1790

Aisne is one of the original 83 departments created during the French Revolution on 4 March 1790. It was created from parts of the former provinces of Île-de-France (Laon, Soissons, Noyon, and Valois, which are actually historical and cultural parts of Picardy that were annexed to Île-de-France), Picardy (Thiérache Vermandois), and Champagne (Brie, and Omois).

Most of the old growth forests in the area were destroyed during battles in World War I. The French offensive against the Chemin des Dames in spring 1917 is sometimes referred to as the Second Battle of the Aisne.

== Heraldry ==
Arms of Aisne	The Arms of Aisne combines the arms of the former Comté de Ponthieu at the top with those of the former Province of Champagne below. The wavy middle bar represents the river Aisne. This shield is a proposal by Robert Louis, and has as yet no official value. The arms of Aisne are blazoned : Party per fess wavy argent, one of Or three bendlets of azure; two of azure with band argent between two cotices potent counter potent of Or and Azure.

== Economy ==
Agriculture dominates the economy, especially cereal crops. Beet sugar is one of the most important industrial crops of the area. Silk, cotton, and wool weaving flourish in Saint-Quentin and other towns. Saint-Gobain is known for its production of mirrors, which started in the 17th century. Guise is the agricultural centre of the northern area of Aisne. Volkswagen Group France has headquarters in Villers-Cotterêts.

== Politics ==
The department is a mixture of rural areas and working-class towns. As a place of residence for some families working in Paris or Île-de-France, Aisne was for many years a department rather oriented to the left, with a majority on the General Council on the left since 1998, and the same for the majority of parliamentary seats representing the department in the National Assembly. However, since the 2000s, Aisne has strongly shifted in favour of the National Rally. Indeed, Aisne is the department that was most favourable to this party during the 2012 presidential elections, having won 26.33% of votes there.

In 2017, Aisne votes 52.91% in favour of the National Rally during the second round. In 2022, this value was 7 points higher, at 59.91%;

The smaller cities of the northern department such as Guise, Hirson, Vervins, and the railway city of Tergnier are sources of support for left-wing parties.

=== Departmental Council ===
The President of the General Council is the Liberal Nicolas Fricoteaux. In the 2021 departmental election, the Departmental Council of Aisne was elected as follows:

Party	Seats
Miscellaneous right	16
Miscellaneous left	12
Miscellaneous centre	8
Miscellaneous	2
The Republicans	2
Centre-right	2

=== Presidential elections 2nd round ===
In the second round of the French presidential elections of 2017 Aisne was one of only two departments (along nearby Pas-de-Calais) in which the candidate of the Front National, Marine Le Pen, received a majority of the votes cast: 52.91%. In the second round of the 2022 French presidential election, Aisne was the mainland departement with the highest percentage support for her.

Election	Winning candidate	Party	%	2nd place candidate	Party	%
2022	Marine Le Pen	FN	59.91	Emmanuel Macron	LREM	40.09
2017	Marine Le Pen	FN	52.91	Emmanuel Macron	LREM	47.09
2012	François Hollande	PS	52.40	Nicolas Sarkozy	UMP	47.60
2007	Nicolas Sarkozy	UMP	53.36	Ségolène Royal	PS	46.64
2002	Jacques Chirac	RPR	75.43	Jean-Marie Le Pen	FN	24.57
1995	Lionel Jospin	PS	54.55	Jacques Chirac	RPR	45.45

== Representatives in the National Assembly ==
Constituency	Member	Party
Aisne's 1st constituency	Nicolas Dragon	National Rally
Aisne's 2nd constituency	Julien Dive	The Republicans
Aisne's 3rd constituency	Eddy Casterman	National Rally
Aisne's 4th constituency	José Beaurain	National Rally
Aisne's 5th constituency	Jocelyn Dessigny	National Rally

== Administration ==
Aisne is divided into five arrondissements and 21 cantons. The department has 797 communes and five parliamentary constituencies.

== Demographics ==
Aisne lost some of its population in the second half of the 19th century, due to the rural exodus but this was limited by the industrial development in the north of the department (Saint-Quentin, Chaunois, Thiérache).

Greatly affected by the First World War, the department has seen its population grow slightly to the same level as in 1900. Since the 1970s, the industrial decline has caused stagnation of the population (526,346 in 1968, 523,342 in 2023). Only the south-west of the department, close to the Paris conurbation, has seen much population growth.

Population development since 1791:

Historical population

Year	Pop.	±% p.a.
1791	407,905	—
1801	425,981	+0.43%
1826	489,460	+0.56%
1851	558,989	+0.53%
1872	552,439	−0.06%
1901	535,583	−0.11%
1911	530,226	−0.10%
1921	421,515	−2.27%
1931	489,368	+1.50%
1946	453,411	−0.51%
1954	487,068	+0.90%

Year	Pop.	±% p.a.
1962	512,920	+0.65%
1968	525,953	+0.42%
1975	533,807	+0.21%
1982	533,927	+0.00%
1990	537,200	+0.08%
1999	535,434	−0.04%
2007	537,750	+0.05%
2012	540,843	+0.11%
2017	534,490	−0.24%
2023	523,342	−0.35%

== Tourism ==
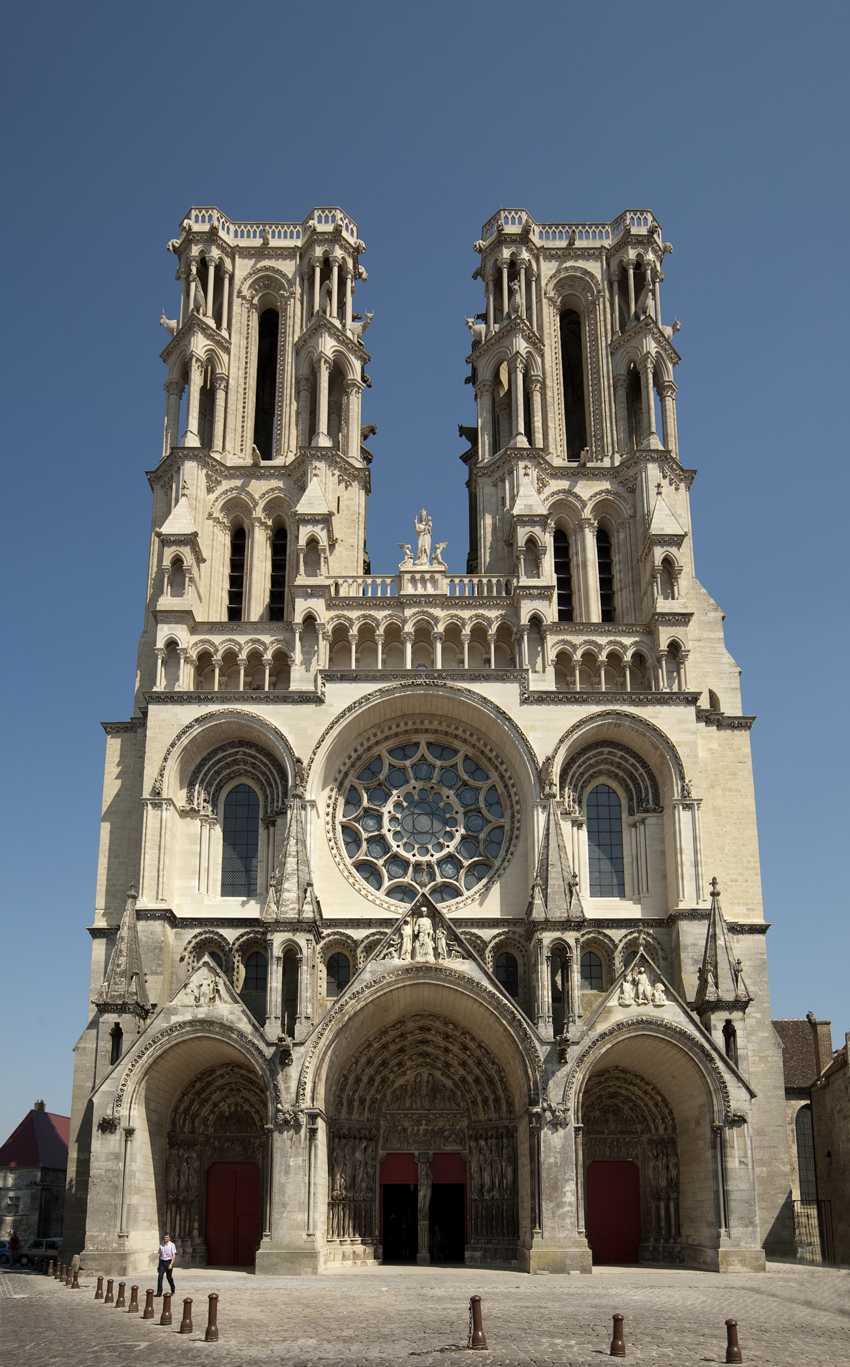
Laon Cathedral

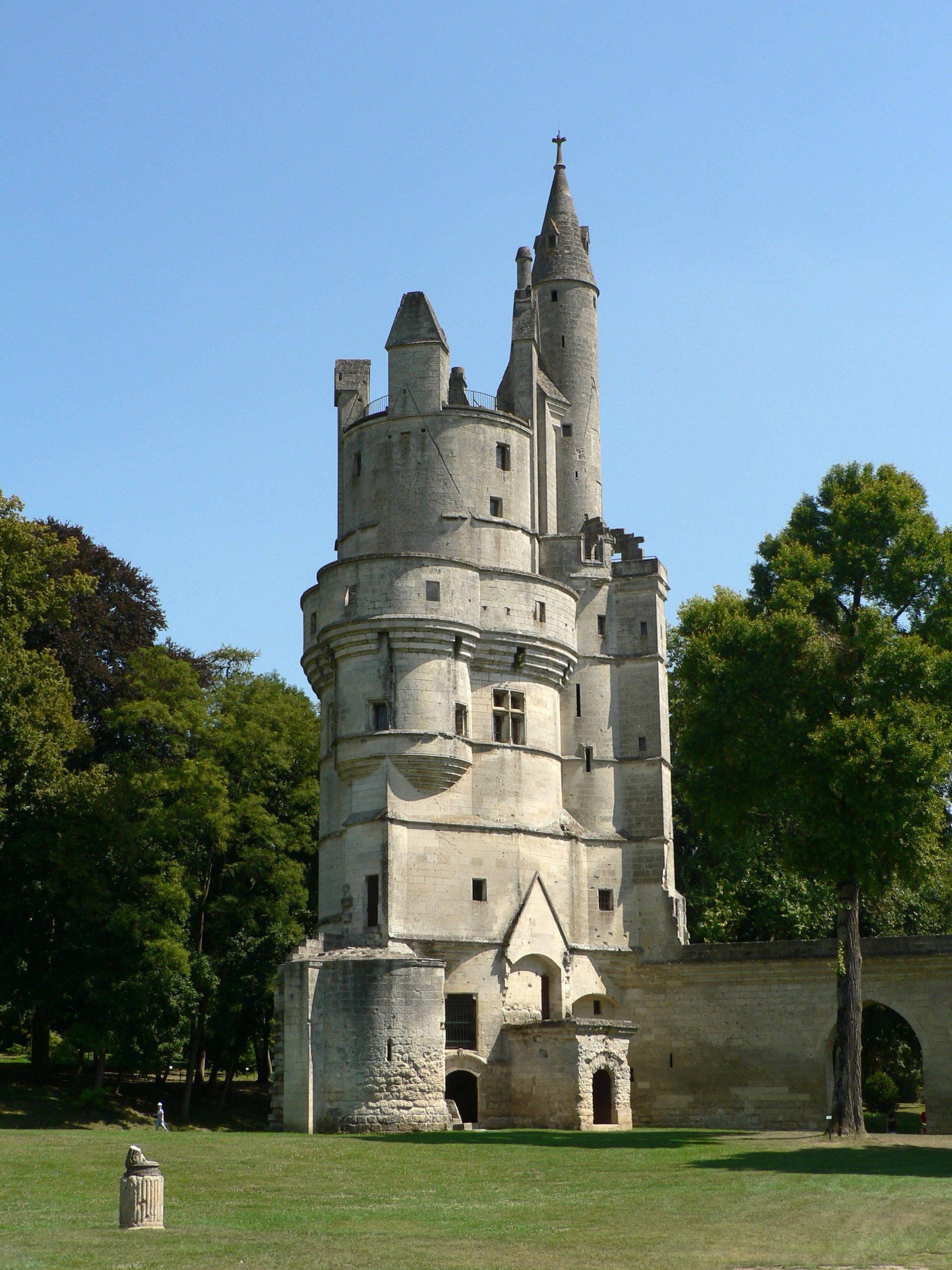
The keep of the castle of Septmonts

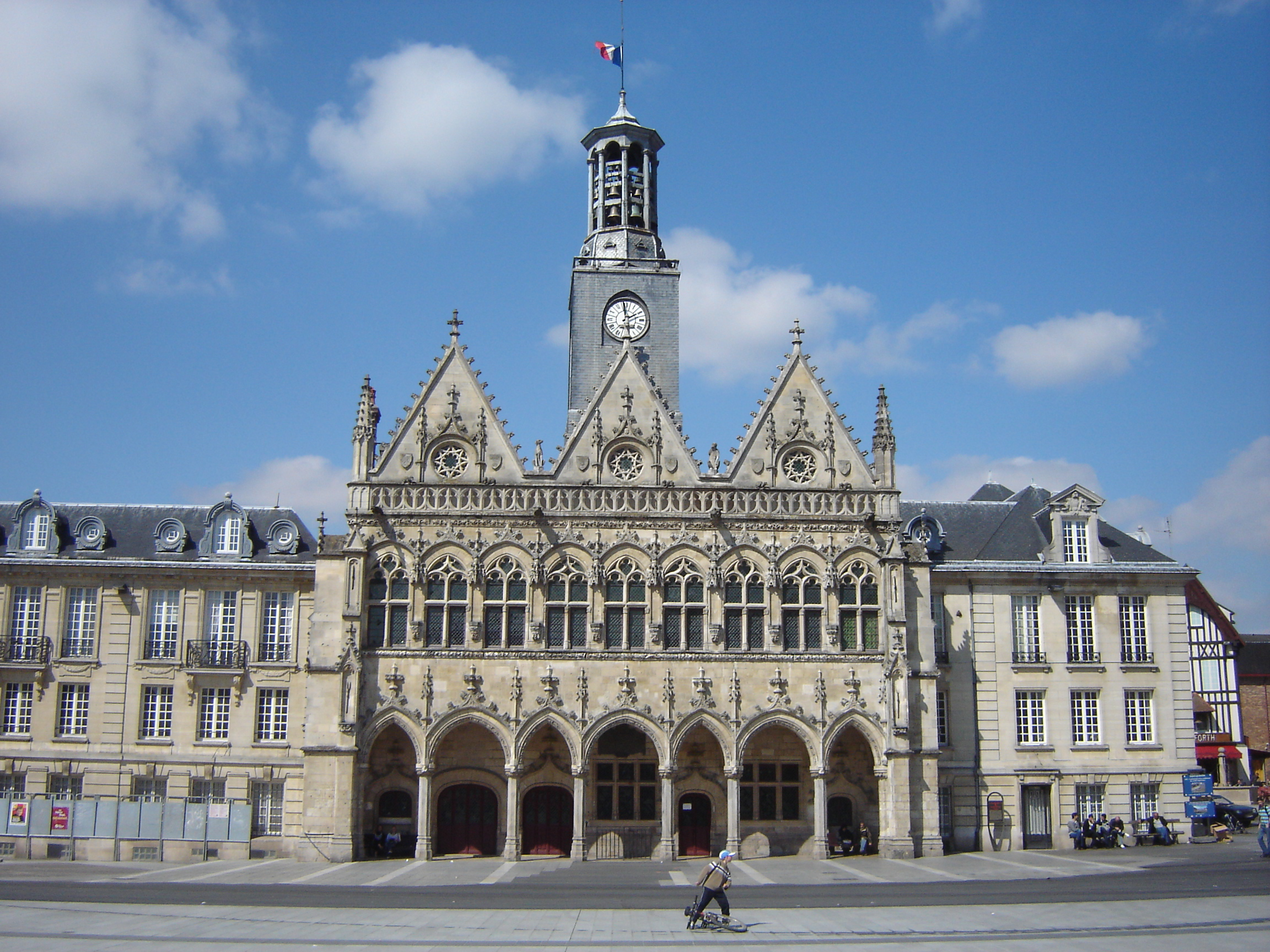
Saint-Quentin townhall

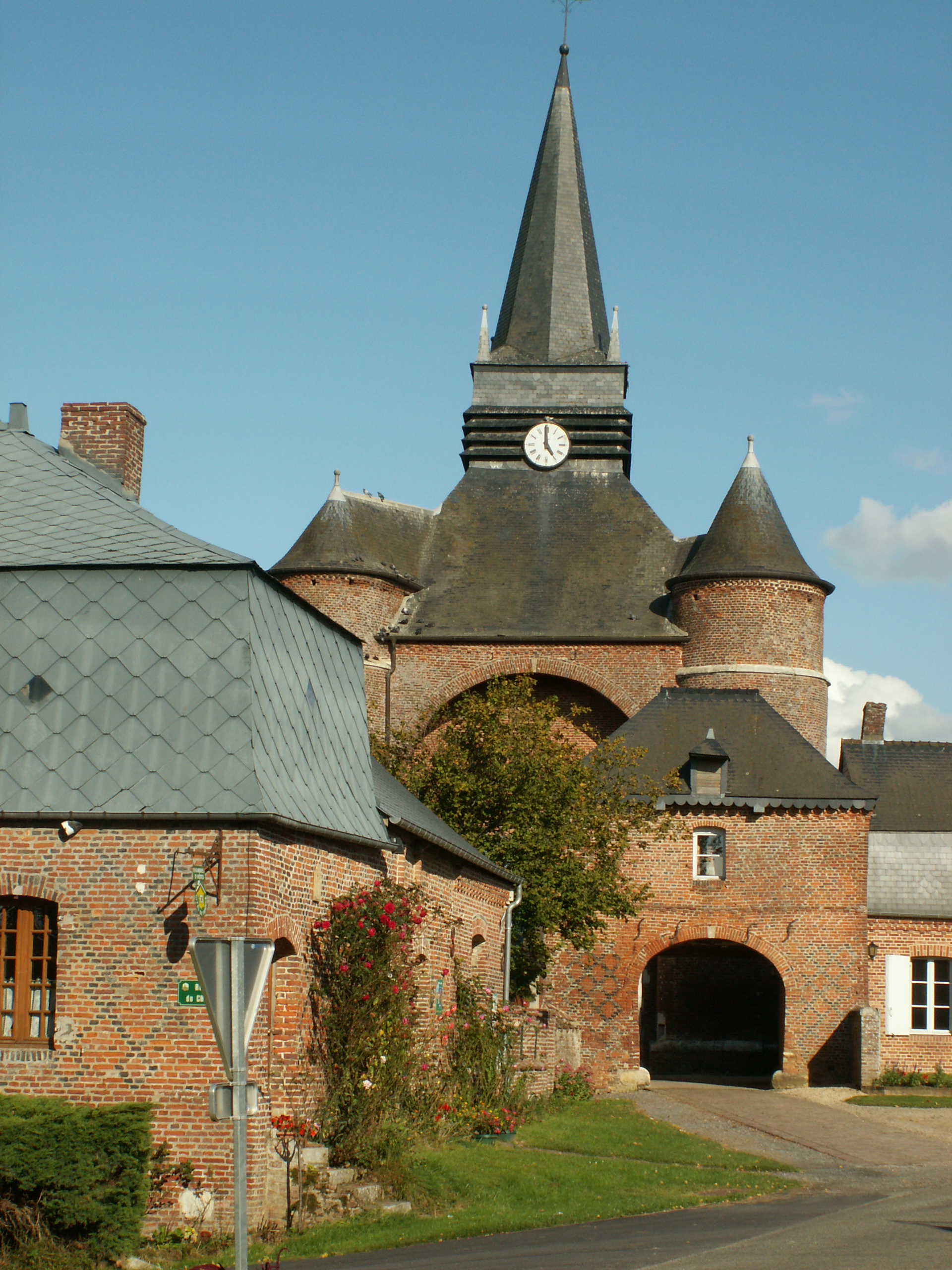
Fortified church of Parfondeval

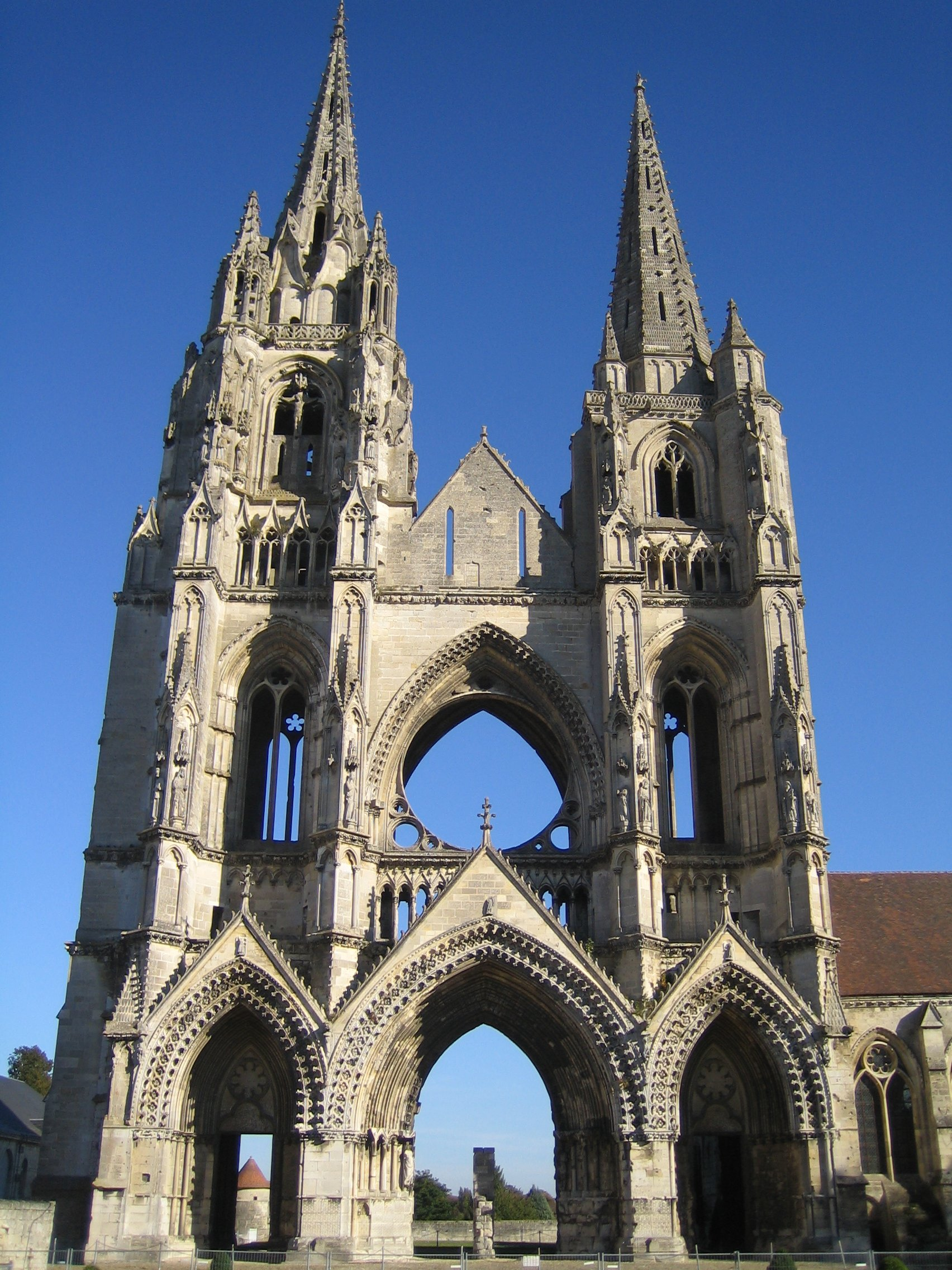
Ruins of the Abbey of St. Jean des Vignes in Soissons

The boat tours relates in part to the Canal de Saint-Quentin with its electric towage and two tunnels (Lesdins and Riqueval/Vendhuile).

In 2007, a large infrastructure for tourist accommodation, the Center Parcs, was built on the Lake of Ailette, close to many tourist attractions such as the Cathedral of Laon, the Chemin des Dames and the Château de Coucy.

Among the many places to explore are:

Monuments

- Castle of Villers-Cotterets at Château-Thierry
- Château de Condé
- Château de Coucy
- Castle Oigny-en-Valois
- Dungeon of Septmonts
- Château of Guise

Cathedrals

- Cathédrale Notre-Dame de Laon
- Soissons Cathedral

Churches and abbeys

- Saint-Michel-en-Thiérache Abbey
- Abbaye du Tortoir de Saint Nicolas aux Bois
- Abbaye Saint-Vincent de Laon
- Abbaye Saint-Martin de Laon
- Longpont Abbey
- Abbey of St. Jean des Vignes
- Vauclair Abbey
- Church of Saint-Caprais
- Abbey church of Saint-Yved de Braine

War memorials of the First World War

- Chemin des Dames
- The Caverne of the Dragon
- The Landowski Ghosts, Margival
- Bois de Belleau/Bois de la Brigade de Marine

Musées

- Musée Henri Matisse à Bohain-en-Vermandois
- Quentin de Latour Museum in Saint-Quentin
- Musée du cheminot, the Familistère de Godin at Guise.

In 2020, the department had 3.4% of second homes.

== Culture ==
During World War I a number of significant architectural monuments were destroyed. Of the buildings that survived, the medieval churches in Laon, Braine, and Urcel are the most significant. The ruined castle of La Ferté-Milon escaped further damage during the war. Of the castles that survived, some were used as prisons, such as the Castle of Vadancourt, near Saint-Quentin (500 prisoners).

It is thought that the Aisne River was the birthplace of the trench warfare seen in the First World War. The British Expeditionary Force (BEF) had initial early successes driving the Germans back to the Aisne River; the German troops dug in and managed to hold out against both British and French attacks. This German entrenchment was to mould the entire face of World War One as both sides began digging in and fortifying their positions. Thus began the stalemate that became a significant feature of the First World War.

=== Languages ===
- Picard in the north
- Champenois dialect in the south
- the French of Île-de-France in the centre and the south.

This linguistic variance probably explains the difficulty for residents south of Aisne to identify themselves as belonging to the Picardy region.

=== Gastronomy ===
- Rustic cuisine. The north of the department is a farming area and there are products made from cow's milk such as Maroilles cheese and Dulce de leche. There are also typically Picardy specialties such as "ficelle", a sort of rolled crêpe with cream cheese, béchamel, ham, and mushrooms. Foie gras is a product developed in Thiérache of the highest quality.
- The cultivation of red fruit (strawberries) is beginning to develop.
- Trade shows for: cheeses (La Capelle), blood sausage (Saint-Quentin).
- Tastings in flea markets and many opportunities to discover local products in a traditional atmosphere.
- In the south there are kidney beans form Soissons and the Tourist route of Champagne where some champagnes produced in the Chateau-Thierry region, like the maroilles, are recognized by the Appellation d'origine contrôlée (AOC).
- Thiérache cider and its eau-de-vie and the production of beer (mostly craft) give the department of Aisne real identity.
- Large swarms of bees mean that the flavours of honey, mead, gingerbread, vinegar etc. can be found.

== Notable people ==
- Camille Desmoulins (1760–1794), revolutionary politician and journalist, was from Guise
- Paul and Camille Claudel came from Tardenois
- Jean de la Fontaine was from Château-Thierry
- Paul Doumer, French president from 1931 to 1932, founder of the journal La tribune de l'Aisne and long time deputy for the departement
- Alexandre Dumas was from Villers-Cotterets
- The fictional character Jean Valjean was born in Faverolles, Aisne
- Jean Racine was from La Ferte-Milon
- Maurice Quentin de la Tour was born in Saint-Quentin
- Louis Antoine de Saint-Just (1767–1794), revolutionary politician and member of the Committee of Public Safety, was from Blérancourt
- François-Noël Babeuf, called Gracchus Babeuf (1760–1797) was from Saint Quentin
- Henri Matisse, painter, spent his childhood in Bohain-en-Vermandois
- Sébastien Cauet, host-producer of television and radio French, is from Marle
- Jean-Baptiste André Godin (1817–1888), an industrialist and French philanthropist, creator of Familistère de Guise
- Nicolas de Condorcet (1743–1794), a philosopher, mathematician and political scientist was from Ribemont
- Leo Lemoine, mayor of Saulchery member of the Resistance in February 1941 and died for France in exile at Buchenwald Dora with his son Jacques (17 years old)
- Kamini, a rapper, is from Le Nouvion-en-Thiérache

== See also ==
- Cantons of the Aisne department
- Communes of the Aisne department
- Arrondissements of the Aisne department
