= House of Nesle =

The House of Nesle was a feudal family that spawned a long line of Counts of Soissons and eventually merged with the House of Clermont (see Counts of Clermont-en-Beauvaisis). Nesle is a commune in northern France near Saint-Quentin, Aisne.

The founder of the House of Nesle is Yves de Nesle (d. after 1076) of unknown parentage. Yves had two children by an unknown wife:

- Dreux de Nesle (d. after 1098), a crusader who took part in the siege of Nicaea in 1097. He had one son from an unknown wife:
  - Raoul I (d. 1125 or after), Seigneur of Nesle, married Raintrude of Soissons, a daughter of William Busac, Count of Eu and Soissons, and had five children:
    - Yves II, Count of Soissons
    - Dreux de Nesle (d. after 1146)
    - Raoul II de Nesle, Châtelain of Bruges
    - Renaud de Nesle
    - Thierry de Nesle (d. before 1183), Thesaurius at Noyon, Archdeacon at Cambrai

Yves II, the first Count of Soissons from the House of Nesle had no children and the lineage passed through his brother Raoul II, who married Gertrude of Monaigu, daughter of Lambert, Count of Montaigu and Clermont. Raoul II and Gertrude had four children:

- Conon, Count of Soissons
- John I of Nesle (d. 1200), Châtelain of Bruges, Seigneur of Nesle, Falvy and Hérelle
- Raoul de Nesle, Count of Soissons
- Baudoin de Nesle

Conon was without issue and the lineage of Counts and Countesses of Soissons continued through his brother Raoul as follows:

- John II le Bègue, son of Raoul de Nesle
- John III, son of the previous
- John IV, son of the previous
- John V, son of the previous
- Hugh, brother of the previous
- Margaret, daughter of the previous.
- Jeanne de Hainaut, daughter of the previous
- Louis III, also Count of Blois, son of the previous
- Guy II, also Count of Blois, brother of the previous

Conon's brother John de Nesle married Elizabeth van Peteghem, daughter of Jan I van Peteghem. John and Elizabeth had five children:

- John II of Nesle (d. 22 December 1239), married to Eustache of Saint-Pol, daughter of Hugh IV, Count of Saint-Pol, and his wife Yolande, daughter of Baldwin IV, Count of Hainaut. [Note that Yolande's first husband was Yves II, Count of Soissons.]
- Ives de Nesle (d. 4 May 1189)
- Raoul de Nesle (d. 1126), Seigneur de Falvy
- Gertrude de Nesle (d. after June 1239), married first Rainaud de Mello, and second Raoul de Clermont, Seigneur d’Ailly, son of Simon de Clermont and his wife Mathilde de Breteuil
- Ada (d. 1254), married Enguerrand II de Coucy, Seigneur de Boves, uncle of Robert de Coucy

With the marriage of Gertrude and Raoul, the houses of Nesle and Clermont (see Counts of Clermont-en-Beauvaisais) were united, and sometimes referred to as the House of Clermont-Nesle.

In addition to the Clermont lineage, the son of John and Elizabeth, Raoul de Nesle, also achieved fame. Raoul married Alix de Roye, widow of John III, Count of Alençon (grandson of John I, Count of Alençon). Their son was John I de Nesle (d. 2 December 1292), who married Joan, Countess of Ponthieu, widow of Ferdinand III, King of Castile (the grandparents of Edward II, King of England). The youngest daughter of Raoul and Alix, Marie (d. after 1328), married John II, Seigneur d’Agimont, son of John I, Count of Looz and Chiny, and his second wife Isabelle de Condé. Drogo of Nesle and Ralph, Lord of Soissons, are likely related to the house but precise relationships are unknown.

== Sources ==
Dormay, C., Histoire de la ville de Soissons et de ses rois, ducs, comtes et gouverneurs, Soissons, 1664 (available on Google Books)
