= John of Soissons =

John of Soissons may refer to:

- John I, Count of Soissons (d. aft. 1115)
- John II, Count of Soissons (r. 1235–1272), trouvère
- John III, Count of Soissons (r. 1272–1286)
- John IV, Count of Soissons (r. 1286–1302)
- John V, Count of Soissons (r. 1302–1304)
- John of Soissons, royal bailli of Cyprus, father of Margaret of Soissons, Queen of Armenia, exiled in 1365
- John of Luxembourg, Count of Soissons (r. 1462–1476)
- John, Count of Soissons and Enghien (d. 1557)
