= Renaud de Soissons =

Renaud de Soissons may refer to:

- Renaud I, Count of Soissons (d. 1057)
- Renaud II, Count of Soissons (d. 1099)
- Renaud III, Count of Soissons (d. 1141)
- Renaud de Soissons, marshal of Cyprus (1210–1217)
