= Hugh of Soissons =

Hugh of Soissons may refer to:

- Hugh Farsit, 12th-century canon and writer
- Hugh, Count of Soissons (died after 1305)
