= Manasses (bishop of Soissons) =

Manasses (died 1 March 1108) was a French nobleman who was a claimant to the bishopric of Cambrai (1095–1103) in the Holy Roman Empire during the Investiture Contest and later served as the bishop of Soissons (1103–1108) in France.

Manasses was a son of William Busac, of the line of counts of Eu, and his wife Adelaide, heiress of the county of Soissons. His elder brother, John, inherited the county.

Manasses was elected by the clergy and people to succeed Bishop Gerard II of Cambrai in 1093, but a rival candidate, Walcher, was invested by the Emperor Henry IV. At the Council of Clermont in 1095, Pope Urban II declared Walcher deposed on account of simony and recognized Manasses. Archbishop Manasses I of Reims consecrated him that year. There followed a series of wars that spread beyond the Cambrésis into the County of Flanders. Finally, in 1103, Count Robert II made peace with the emperor. Pope Paschal II transferred Manasses to the diocese of Soissons. It is unclear if Manasses had ever been able to actually control Cambrai. He was succeeded as bishop of Cambrai by Odo of Tournai.

Manasses' transfer to Soissons put both county and bishopric in the hands of the same family, although Guibert of Nogent in his memoirs notes that the brothers quarreled with their mother and "in this family everyone hated everyone else". As bishop, Manasses did institute an anniversary mass for his mother's soul and his own.

Manasses attended a provincial synod in 1103 and was present at the Council of Troyes in April 1104. In 1107, he gave a church at Crécy to the Abbey of Nogent-sous-Coucy and consecrated the church of Notre-Dame at La Ferté-Milon. He died on 1 March 1108 and was succeeded as bishop of Soissons by Liziard de Crépy. He was buried in the church of the Priory of Coincy.

== Sources ==
- Fisquet, Honoré (1864). La France pontificale (Gallia Christiana): Métropole de Reims. Étienne Repos.
- Gams, Pius Bonifatius (1873). Series episcoporum Ecclesiae catholicae: quotquot innotuerunt a beato Petro apostolo. Typis et Sumptibus Georgii Josephi Manz.
- Hewett, Mark (2025). King Philip I and the Church: Ruling France in an Age of Reform (PDF) (PhD dissertation). University of Reading.
- McAlhany, Joseph; Rubenstein, Jay, eds. (2011). Monodies and On the Relics of Saints: The Autobiography and a Manifesto of a French Monk from the Time of the Crusades. Penguin.
- Resnick, Irven M. (1997). "Odo of Cambrai and the Investiture Crisis in the Early Twelfth Century". Viator. 28 (1): 83–98. doi:10.1484/J.VIATOR.2.301073.
- Robinson, I. S. (1999). Henry IV of Germany, 1056–1106. Cambridge University Press.
