= Nocher II of Soissons =

Nocher II (died 1019), Count of Bar-sur-Aube, Count of Soissons. He was the son of Nocher I, Count of Bar-sur-Aube. Nocher's brother Beraud (d. 1052) was Bishop of Soissons.

Nocher became Count of Soissons, jure uxoris, upon his marriage to Adelise, Countess of Soissons. Nocher and Adelisa had three children:

- Nocher III (d. 1040), Count of Bar-sur-Aube, had at least two daughters by unknown wife:
  - Adèle (d. 1053), Countess of Bar-sur-Aube
  - Isabeau
- Guy, archbishop of Reims
- Renaud I, Count of Soissons

Nocher's son and namesake became Count of Bar-sur-Aube upon his death, and the countship of Soissons reverted to his wife. His son Renaud would eventually become the Count of Soissons.

== Sources ==
- Locatelli, René (1992). Sur les chemins de la perfection: moines et chanoines dans le diocese de Besancon ver.1060-1220 (in French). Publications de l'Universitie de Saint Etienne.
