= Hôtel de Ville, Soissons =

Town hall in Soissons, France

Hôtel de Ville
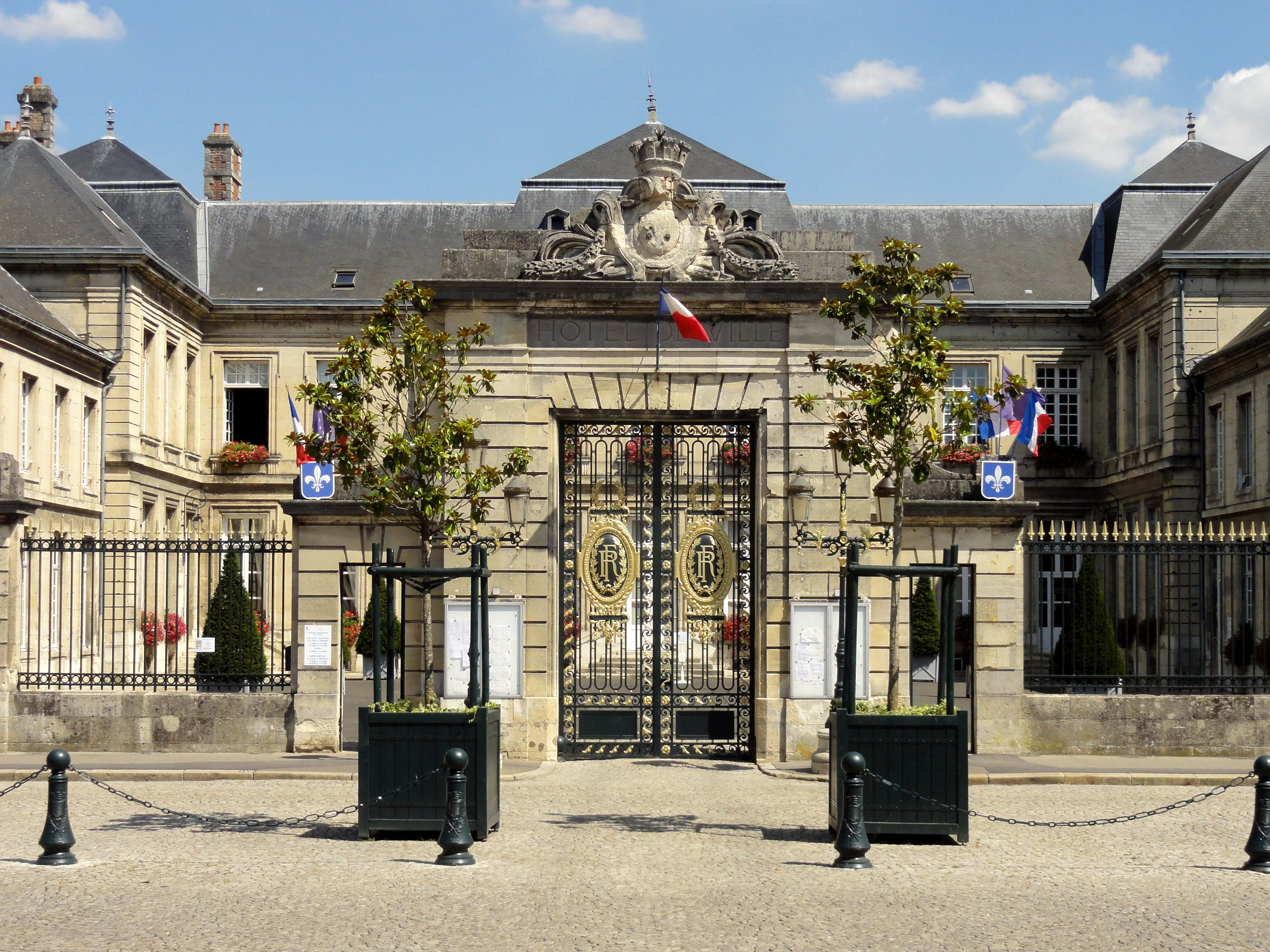
- The main frontage of the Hôtel de Ville in August 2018

General information
- Type: City hall
- Architectural style: Neoclassical style
- Location: Soissons, France
- Coordinates: 49.3837°N 3.3286°E
- Completed: 1775

Design and construction
- Architect: Jean-François Advyné

Monument historique
- Official name: Hôtel de ville
- Type: Inscrit
- Designated: 2007
- Reference no.: PA02000064

The Hôtel de Ville (French pronunciation: [otɛl də vil], City Hall) is a municipal building in Soissons, Aisne, in northeastern France, standing on Place de l'hôtel de Ville. It was designated a monument historique by the French government in 2007.

== History ==
After the French Revolution, the town council established their first town hall in a building in the Grand Place. The forces of the Friedrich von Bülow and Ferdinand von Wintzingerode laid siege to the town on 2 March 1814 during the Napoleonic Wars. After the town capitulated, the Prussian forces pillaged the town for three days. When Napoleon's forces sought to recover the town on 5 March 1814, the town hall was burnt down, and the municipal archives were destroyed. After the war, the council set aside FFR 10,000 for the reconstruction of the town hall.

However, in the early 1830s, the town council led by the mayor, Théodore Quinette de Rochemont, decided to acquire a more substantial building. The building they selected was the Palais de l'Intendance. The building had been commissioned by the local intendant, Louis Le Peletier de Mortefontaine, following his appointment in 1765. The site he selected had been occupied by the château of the counts of Soissons which had long been empty. The château was demolished in 1772 and construction of the new building started shortly thereafter. It was designed by Jean-François Advyné in the neoclassical style, built in ashlar stone and was completed in 1775.

The building was laid out as a typical hôtel particulier with a grand gate, a grand courtyard and two ornate façades. The rear façade faced onto a finely landscaped garden on the west bank of the river Aisne, while the front façade involved a main block and two wings, which were projected forward to enclose the courtyard. The central section of the main block, which was slightly projected forward, featured a doorway in the central bay flanked by a pair of tall casement windows. On the first floor, there were three more casement windows, which were flanked by full-height pilasters supporting a pediment with finely carved figures in the tympanum. The outer bays were fenestrated in a similar style. Internally, the principal rooms included the grand salon, which featured fine wooden doors, and the cellars, which featured vaulted ceilings. After the French Revolution it was used as a school and then as the prefecture before being acquired by the council in 1834.

The forces of Duke William of Mecklenburg-Schwerin laid siege to the town during the Franco-Prussian War causing widespread damage. On 15 September 1870, manuscripts from the city library, paintings from the museum, and the civil registry records were moved to the cellars of the town hall as protection from rampaging Prussian troops.

During the First World War, the town was badly damaged by German shelling in the First Battle of the Aisne and subsequent attacks; the barracks and town hall were specifically targeted and the town hall was pillaged again. During the Second World War, elements of the French Resistance seized the town hall on 27 August 1944; this was the day before the liberation of the town by American troops of the 3rd Armored Division, guided by the French Forces of the Interior.
