= Raoul II of Nesle =

Raoul II of Nesle (died 1160), son of Raoul I, Seigneur of Nesle, and his wife Rainurde d'Eu. Châtelain of Nesle and Bruges.

Raoul was brother to Yves II, Count of Soissons, and supported his donation of the chapel of Beaulieu to the abbey of Soissons (presumably the Abbey of St. Medard, Soissons, rebuilt in 1131 by Pope Innocent II). Raoul was allied with Thierry, Count of Flanders, and signed a charter in which the latter donated property to the town of Saint-Omer.

Raoul married Gertrude de Montaigu, daughter of Lambert, Count of Montaigu and Clermont, and his wife [either the daughter of Henry III, Count of Louvain, or Giselbert, Count of Clermont]. Raoul and Gertrude had four children:

- Conon, Count of Soissons
- John of Nesle (d. 1200), Châtelain of Bruges, Seigneur of Nesle, Falvy, and Hérelle
- Raoul le Bon, Count of Soissons
- Baudouin of Nesle.

== Sources ==
- Griffiths, Quentin (1997). "Royal Counselors and Trouvères in the Houses of Nesle and Soissons". Medieval Prosopography. 18. Medieval Institute Publications: 123–137.
