= Hugh Farsit =

Hugh Farsit (fl. 1111–1143), also known as Hugh of Soissons, was a canon regular of Saint-Jean-des-Vignes and a Latin writer. He had a sister, Helvide, who was probably a canoness at Sainte-Waudru de Mons.

Hugh was born late in the 11th century. Between 1111 and 1114 or 1115, he wrote a work for his sister entitled Otium ('Leisure'). It comprises four books of 135 chapters of Hugh's theological and moral reflections and is in part a "spiritual autobiography". The title was meant to indicate that Hugh was writing in his leisure time. Each book corresponds to a year's thoughts. The Otium has not been edited. Bruce Venarde has translated chapter 57 from book 1 on the Laon uprising of 1112.

In Otium, Hugh refers to four earlier works he had written, but these have not been preserved. They are: a vision he had received recounted in hexameters, which he describes in prose in Otium; Progress of the Inner Man, a work in six books; a book about Jerusalem; and a letter on heresy to the canons regular of Jerusalem.

Sometime after 1132, probably after the death of Abbess Mathilde I de la Ferté-sous-Jouarre in December 1143, Hugh began work on A Little Book of Miracles of the Blessed Virgin Mary in the City of Soissons. Since the work has no prologue, his reason for writing it is unknown. He was probably working at the request of the nuns of Notre-Dame de Soissons and Abbess Mathilde II. The miracles that Hugh records took place between 1128 and 1132 during the abbacy of Mathilde I. They initially coincided with an outbreak of ergotism and many of the miracles of 1128–1130 are cures of that condition. Hugh's Little Book is the earliest existing source to mention the relic of the Virgin Mary's slipper at Soissons. There are at least five manuscripts of the Little Book from the 12th and 13th centuries. Gautier de Coinci's vernacular Miracles de Notre-Dame de Soissons is based on Hugh's work.

In 1143, Hugh wrote a letter to the Premonstratensians gathered at Coblenz, who were seeking to resolve divisions within their order. Hugh urged unity and fidelity to their founder's vision.

Hugh's death on 4 August is commemorated in the necrologies of Saint-Jean-des-Vignes, the cathedral of Soissons and the abbey of Prémontré. The year of his death is unknown. The necrology of Saint-Jean-des-Vignes records that he donated some religious and secular books to the canonry.

== Bibliography ==
- Constable, Giles (1994). "The Letter of Hugh of Soissons to the Premonstratensian Abbots". In Cesare Alzati (ed.). Cristianità ed Europa: Miscellanea di studi in onore di Luigi Prosdocimi. Vol. 1. Herder. pp. 249–263.
- Clark, Anne L. (2007). "Guardians of the Sacred: The Nuns of Soissons and the Slipper of the Virgin Mary". Church History. 76 (4): 724–749. doi:10.1017/S0009640700500031.
- Venarde, Bruce L., ed. (2024). The Miracles of Mary in Twelfth-Century France. Cornell University Press.
