= William Busac =

English noble (1020–1076)

William Busac (c. 1020–1076), son of William I, Count of Eu, and his wife Lesceline, was the Count of Soissons de jure uxoris. William was given the nickname Busac by the medieval chronicler Robert of Torigni.

William seems to have been persuaded by King Henry I of France to try to seize the duchy of Normandy after Henry's defeat in the Battle of Mortemer in 1054. He seized the castle of Eu but was soon driven into exile by Duke William the Bastard. William Busac then appealed to Henry, who in 1058 gave him in marriage Adelaide, the heiress of the county of Soissons. Adelaide was daughter of Renaud I, Count of Soissons and Grand Master of the Hotel de France. William then became Count of Soissons in right of his wife. William and Adelaide had five children:

- Renaud II, Count of Soissons (died 1099)
- John I, Count of Soissons (died after 1115), married to Aveline de Pierrefonds
- Manasses of Soissons, Bishop of Cambrai, Bishop of Soissons (died 1 Mar 1108)
- Lithuise de Blois, married to Milo I of Montlhéry
- Raintrude, married to Raoul I of Nesle, a member of the House of Nesle.

His son Renaud became Count of Soissons upon William's death, and he was succeeded by his brother John.

== Sources ==
- Crouch, David (2002). The Normans: The History of a Dynasty. Hambledon Continuum.
- Douglas, David (1946). "The Earliest Norman Counts". The English Historical Review. 61 (240 May). Oxford University Press.
- Newman, William Mendel (1971). Les seigneurs de Nesle en Picardie (XIIe-XIIIe siècle): Recueil des Chartes (in French). Edition A. & J. Picard.
- Waters, Edmund C. (1886). "The Counts of Eu, Sometime Lords of the Honour of Tickhill". The Yorkshire Archaeological and Topographical Journal. 9: 257–302.
