= Renaud II =

Renaud II may refer to:

- Renaud II, Count of Clermont-en-Beauvaisis (1075–1152)
- Renaud II, Count of Soissons (died 1099)
- Reginald II, Count of Bar (died 1170)
