= Guy II of Soissons =

Guy II (died 1057), son of Renaud I, Count of Soissons, and his wife (name unknown), widow of Hilduin III, Count of Montdidier. Guy was identified as Count of Soissons in 1042 in a charter in which Gaunilo of Marmoutiers, the treasurer of St. Martin, denoted property. Guy died with his father in 1057 at the siege of Soissons.

It is not known whether or not Guy was married and no children are recorded. Upon his death, his sister Adelaide assumed the countship of Soissons.

== Sources ==
Dormay, C., Histoire de la ville de Soissons et de ses rois, ducs, comtes et gouverneurs, Soissons, 1664 (available on Google Books)
