= Pierrekin de la Coupele =

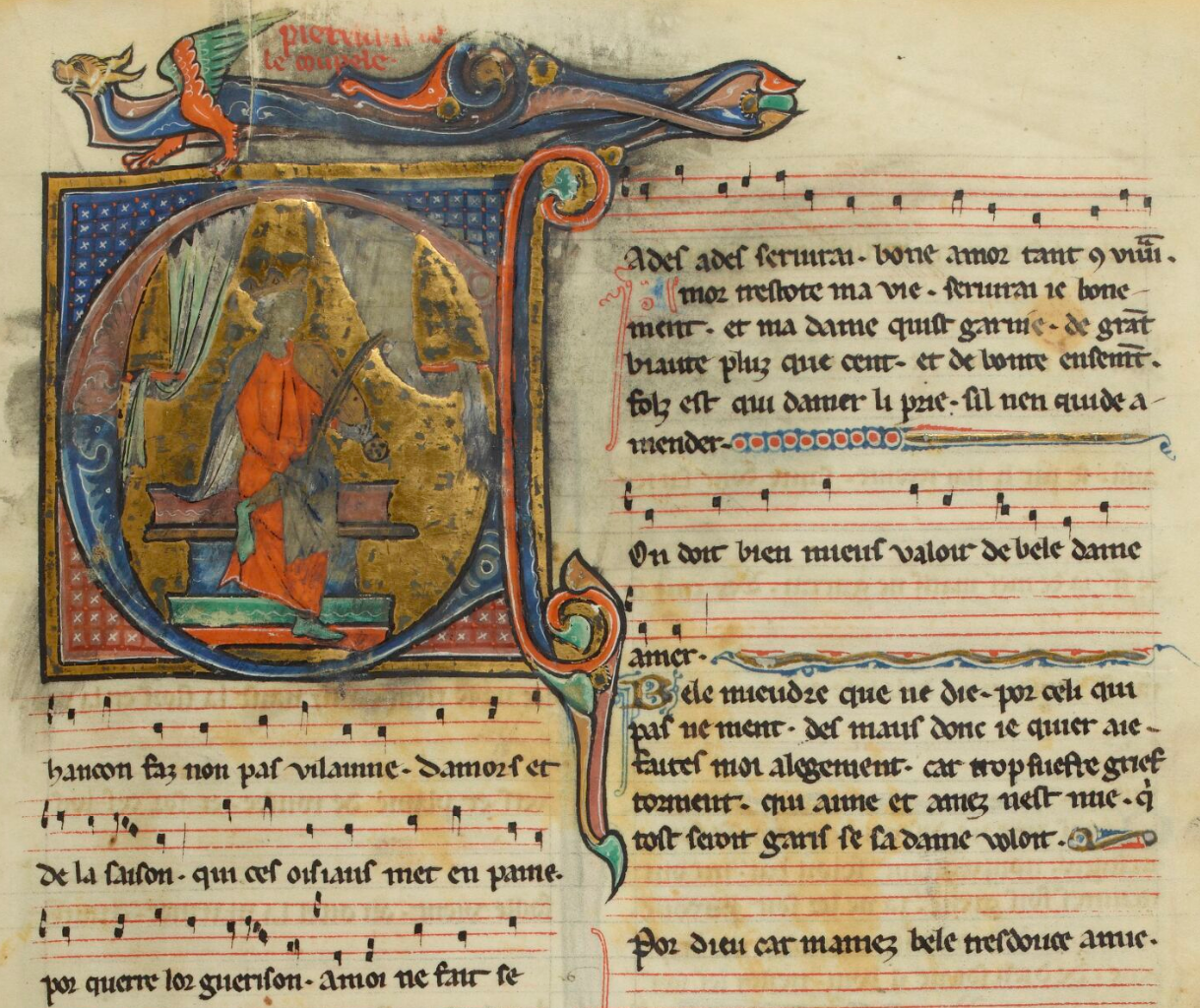
Pierrekin—crowned and playing a vielle—sits in a decorative initial at the start of his music in the Chansonnier du Roi

Pierrekin de la Coupele (fl. 1240–60) was a northern French trouvère from the Pas-de-Calais, probably the localities nowadays called Coupelle-Vieille and Coupelle-Neuve. He is regarded as a poor poet. His literary connexions and the period of his activity can be established by his song Je chant en aventure, which was directed at an unnamed Count of Soissons, probably Jehan de Nesle, whose brother and predecessor as count, Raoul, was a trouvère.

Six pieces by Pierrekin survive, half with their music. One of the latter, "A mon pooir ai servi", a later addition to the Chansonnier du Roi, is through-composed in mensural notation. Lines equivalent in length are not all treated as rhythmically identical. Pierrekin's other songs with surviving music are "Cançon faz non pas vilaine" and "Je chant en aventure". The three songs "J'ai la meillor qui soit en vie", "Quant ivers et frois depart" and "Quant li tens jolis revient" do not have surviving music.
