= Renaud III =

Renaud III may refer to:

- Renaud III, Count of Soissons (d. after 1141)
- Reginald III, Count of Burgundy (c. 1093 – 1148)
- Reginald III, Duke of Guelders (1333–1371)
