= Ralph of Soissons =

Ralph of Soissons or Raoul de Soissons may refer to:

- Ralph, Count of Soissons (died 1235)
- Ralph of Soissons (trouvère) (fl. 1232–1270), son of preceding
