= Battle of Soissons =

Battle of Soissons can refer to several battles in the vicinity of the French town Soissons:

- Battle of Soissons (486), between the Franks and a Roman successor state under Syagrius
- Battle of Soissons (718), between the Neustrians with the Aquitainians against the Austrasians
- Battle of Soissons (923), between Carolingians and Robertians during a succession war
- Battle of Soissons (1814), Napoleonic Wars
- Siege of Soissons (1870), Franco-Prussian War
- Battle of Soissons (1918), World War I, between French-American and German troops
