= Adelise of Soissons =

Adelisa was Countess of Soissons in 988–1047.

== Life ==
She was the daughter of Guy I, Count of Soissons and his wife, Adelisa. In 988, Adelisa inherited from her father as his only child.

== Marriage and issue ==
Adelisa married Nocher II, Count of Bar-sur-Aube. Adelisa and Nocher had at least one child:

- Renaud I, Count of Soissons

Nocher II became Count of Soissons, jure uxoris, upon his marriage to Adelisa, but apparently died in 1019, at which point Adelisa ruled until Renaud was of age.
