= Adelaide of Soissons =

Adelaide (died 1105) was the countess of Soissons from 1057 until 1105.

She was the daughter of Count Raynald I of Soissons, and his wife, Lessaline of Dammartin, widow of Hilduin III, Count of Montdidier.

Adelaide became ruler of the County of Soissons upon the death of her father and brother, Guy II of Soissons, in 1057.

Adelaide married William Busac, Count of Eu. Adelaide and William had five children:

- Raynald II of Soissons
- John I of Soissons, married to Aveline de Pierrefonds
- Manasses, bishop of Cambrai, bishop of Soissons
- Lithuise, married to Milo I of Montlhéry
- daughter, name unknown, married to Yves le Vieux

William Busac became count of Soissons, jure uxoris, upon their marriage.

== Sources ==
- Dormay, C., Histoire de la ville de Soissons et de ses rois, ducs, comtes et gouverneurs, Soissons, 1664 (available on Google Books)
