= Guy I of Soissons =

Guy I (d. after 986), son of Herbert II, Count of Vermandois, and a daughter of Robert I of France. Count of Soissons, inherited from his father upon his death in 943. There is considerable confusion about both Guy's parentage. Another source claims that Guy was the grandson of Herbert II, being the son of Adalbert I, Count of Vermandois, although there is no evidence that Adalbert was a Count of Soissons.

Little is known about Guy. His name appears in a 974 charter in which Lothair of France confirmed the privileges of monastery of Saint-Thierry near Reims. Lothair also confirmed the monastery of Saint-Eloy de Noyon in memory of Guy's brother Liudolf of Vermandois, Bishop of Noyon and Tournai. Guy founded the abbey at Saint-Quentin near Péronne, and visited Rome in the mid-980s.

Guy married the daughter of a Count Giselbert of which nothing is known. Guy and Adelisa had one daughter:

- Adelise, Countess of Soissons.

Upon his death, Adelisa succeeded to the county.

== Sources ==
- Marignan, Albert; Platon, Jean Georges; Wilmotte, Maurice; Prou, Maurice, eds. (1906). Le Moyen âge. Librairie Ancienne Honore Champion, Editeur.
