= Raynald III of Soissons =

Renaud III (died 1141), son of John I, Count of Soissons, and Aveline de Pierrefonds. Count of Soissons.

Little is known about Renaud other than he inherited the Count of Soissons from his father in 1115. Upon Renaud's death in 1141, Ivo II de Nesle was chosen as his successor by the Bishop of Soisson, Joscelin de Vierzi.

Renaud married Bathilde, of an unknown family, in 1137. No children are recorded. Renaud was the last of the Norman counts of Soissons.

== Sources ==
- Becket, Thomas (2000). Duggan, Anne (ed.). The Correspondence of Thomas Becket, Archbishop of Canterbury, 1162-1170. Vol. I. Oxford University Press.
- Slack, Corliss Konwiser (2001). Crusade Charters, 1138-1270. Arizona Center for Medieval and Renaissance Studies.
