= Ivo II of Soissons =

Yves II le Vieux of Nesle (Ives, Ivo) (died 1178), son of Raoul I, Seigneur of Nesle, and his wife Rainurde (Ermentrude) of Eu-Soissons. Seigneur of Nesle, Count of Soissons. Upon the death of Renaud III, Count of Soissons, Yves was chosen as the next count by the Bishop of Soissons, Joscelin de Vierzi.

Following the preaching of Bernard of Clairvaux at Vézelay in 1146, Yves joined Louis VII and a host of French nobles in the Second Crusade. He was part of the Council of Acre in June 1148 and was one of many suitors for Constance of Antioch following her husband's death in 1149.

Yves married Yolande, a daughter of Baldwin IV, Count of Hainaut, and his wife Alice of Namur. They had no children.

Upon the death of Yves, his nephew Conon became Count of Soissons.

== Sources ==
- Bisson, Thomas N., ed. (1995). Cultures of Power: Lordship, Status, and Process in Twelfth-Century Europe. University Pennsylvania Press.
- Bradbury, Jim (2007). The Capetians: Kings of France 987-1328. Hambledon Continuum.
- Gislebertus of Mons (2005). Chronicle of Hainaut. Translated by Napran, Laura. The Boydell Press.
- Hodgson, Natasha R. (2007). Women, Crusading and the Holy Land in Historical Narrative. The Boydell Press.
- Slack, Corliss Konwiser (2001). Crusade Charters, 1138-1270. Arizona Center for Medieval and Renaissance Studies.
