= Abbey of Saint-Jean-des-Vignes =

11th-century abbey in Aisne, France

- Abbaye Saint-Jean-des-Vignes
- Abbaye Saint-Jean-des-Vignes
- Abbey of Saint-Jean-des-Vignes
- 49°22′32″N 3°19′26″E
- Location: Soissons, France
- Denomination: Roman Catholic Church

History
- Status: Suppressed in 1795

Architecture
- Functional status: Ruined
- Architectural type: Church
- Style: Gothic
- Groundbreaking: 1076; 950 years ago
- Completed: 1520; 506 years ago

Specifications
- Height: 75 m (246 ft 1 in)
- Materials: Stone

Monument historique
- Official name: Abbey of Saint-Jean-des-Vignes
- Type: Classé
- Designated: 1875
- Reference no.: PA00115938

The Abbey of Saint-Jean-des-Vignes (French: L’abbaye Saint-Jean-des-Vignes), was an Augustinian abbey located on Saint-Jean hill, southwest of the city of Soissons in the Aisne department of France. Founded in 1076 by Augustan canons, the original Romanesque buildings were gradually replaced from the late 12th century onward in a Gothic style. The abbey flourished during the Middle Ages, but was ruined and abandoned during the Wars of Religion and the French Revolution, when much of the complex was dismantled. Today, only parts of the church and conventual buildings survive, most notably the façade of the former church and sections of the cloister. The abbey has been listed as a historic monument since 1875.

== History ==
The abbey was founded in 1076 on the top of Colline Saint-Jean (St. John's Hill) as a small monastery for a community of Augustinian canons, near the site of an ancient Roman Christian cemetery. Receiving early support and confirmation from the Counts of Soissons and King Philip I, a Romanesque cathedral was constructed and dedicated to St. John the Baptist to replace the existing structure. During the 13th century, the abbey was almost entirely rebuilt again in Gothic style and expanded to include a vaulted cloister, a vast refectory, dormitories, chapter house, and agricultural facilities. As a result of the newly expanded facilities, Saint-Jean-des-Vignes became one of the wealthiest institutions in the country, maintaining close ties with the University of Paris.

During the Hundred Years' War, further construction on the church was paused, and the site was used as a military headquarters for Charles VI. Ramparts and fortifications were constructed around the hill, and a moat was dug around the site. Despite these protective measures, the abbey was ultimately overrun and looted. After the liberation of Soissons by Joan of Arc in 1429, construction resumed on the towers, and the abbey was reconsecrated in 1478 by Jean Milet, Bishop of Soissons. Construction concluded with the completion of the last tower in 1520, and In 1544, the abbey lent its nave to Charles V for a short stay in preparation for the Treaty of Crépy. By the middle 15th century, Henry II decided to further strengthen the strategic defenses of Soissons. The Saint-Jean hill, with the abbey, was deemed too dangerous by the engineers, who proposed razing the monastery altogether. The town of Soissons protested vehemently, and Bishop Mathieu de Longuejoue, a close ally of the king, managed to save the abbey and incorporate it within the city walls. In return, the monastery was forced to reduce its vineyard enclosures and its territory to be included within the city limits.

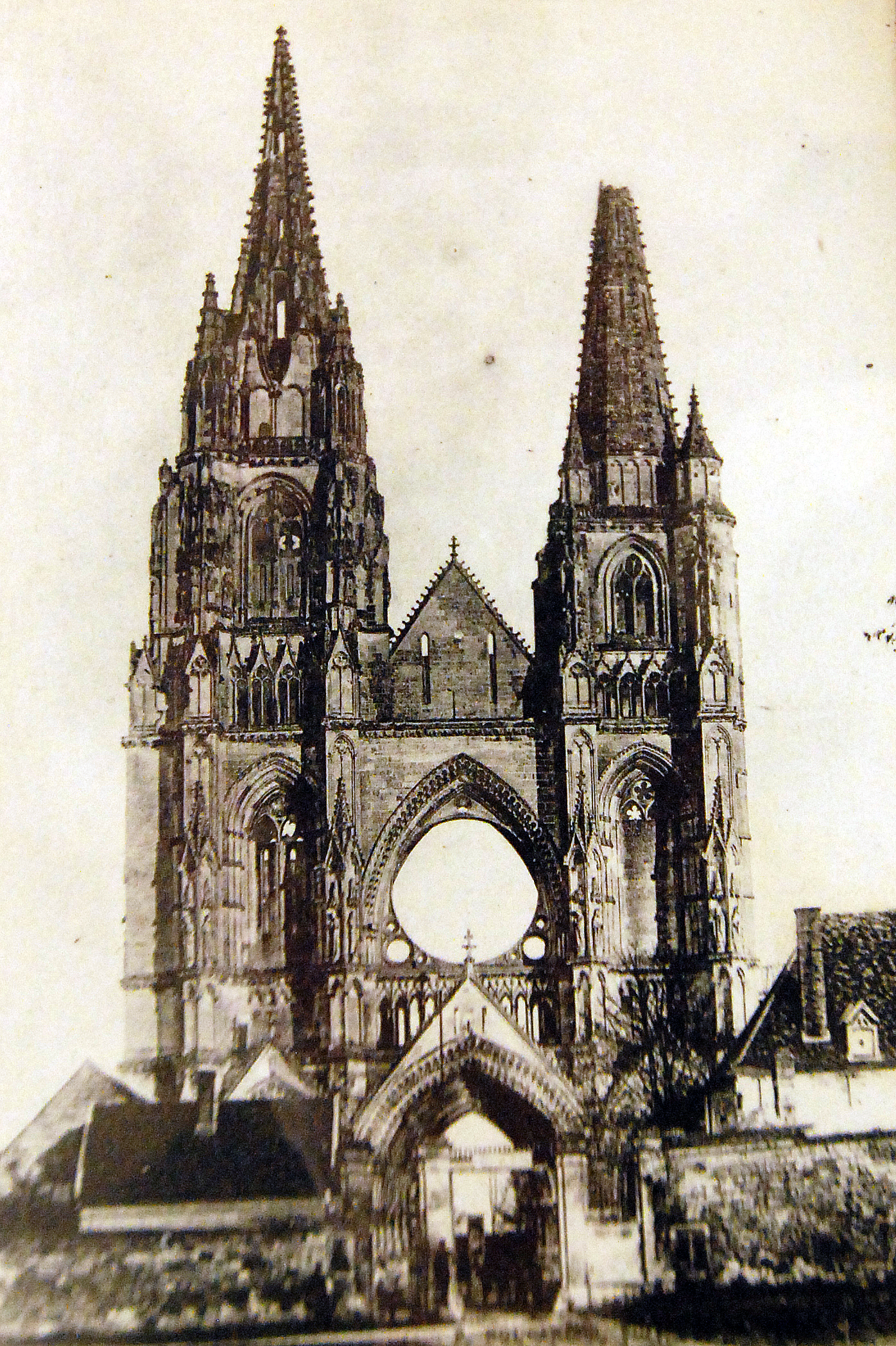
Damage to the abbey during WW1

The abbey was severely damaged and looted by Protestant Huguenots during the Wars of Religion, and ultimately abandoned after the expulsion of monks during the French Revolution. Although the church was lightly restored in the 17th century under the direction of the Congregation of France, the abbey never regained its prominence, and was left in ruins. The site was sold by Napoleon I in 1804 to the bishop of Soissons, who further dismantled the structure to restore the nearby Soissons Cathedral and turned the existing site into a quarry. Throughout the 19th century, the abbey, which was partially put to use as an arsenal, sustained further severe damage, first by fire during the Franco-Prussian War, and from heavy German shelling during World War I. Despite these damages, the structure survived relatively intact through World War II, and was acquired by the town of Soissons in the 1970s. The remaining buildings are now occupied by various educational and heritage-related organizations.

== Sources ==
- Soissons Municipal website: Abbey of Saint-Jean-des-Vignes (in French)
- Saint-Jean-des-Vignes: Archaeology, Architecture, and History of an Augustinian Monastery
