= Conon, Count of Soissons =

Conon of Nesle (died 1180), son of Raoul II of Nesle and Gertrude, daughter of Lambert, Count of Montaigu. Châtelain of Bruges, Count of Soissons. Conon became Count of Soissons upon the death of his uncle Yves II in 1178.

In 1164, Conon married Agather of Pierrefonds, daughter of Dreux, Seigneur of Perrefonds, and his wife Beatrix. They had no children.

Upon his death in 1180, Conon was succeeded as Count of Soissons by his brother Raoul.

== Sources ==
Dormay, C., Histoire de la ville de Soissons et de ses rois, ducs, comtes et gouverneurs, Soissons, 1664 (available on Google Books)
