= Hugh, Count of Soissons =

Hugh of Nesle (d. after October 1305), son of John IV, Count of Soissons, and his wife Marguerite of Rumigny. Count of Soissons. Hugh became count after the death of his brother John in 1304.

Hugh married Jeanne de Dargies (Johanna of Argies), daughter of Renaud II, Seigneur de Dargies and Catheux, and his wife Agnes de Bruyères.

Hugh and Jeanne had one child:

- Margaret, Countess of Soissons

After his death, Hugh’s widow Jeanne married John of Clermont, Baron of Charolais, son of Robert, Count of Clermont, and grandson of Louis IX of France. Hugh was succeeded in his rule of the county by his daughter Margaret.

== Sources ==
Dormay, C., Histoire de la ville de Soissons et de ses rois, ducs, comtes et gouverneurs, Soissons, 1664 (available on Google Books)
