= John III of Soissons =

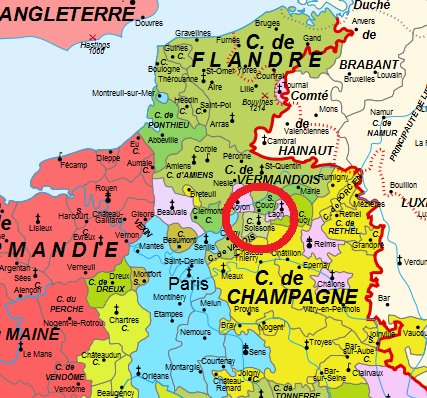
Count of Soissons

John III (died before 8 October 1286), son of John II, Count of Soissons, and Marie de Chimay. Count of Soissons and Seigneur of Chimay. John inherited the countship of Soissons upon his father’s death in 1272.

John married Marguerite de Montfort, daughter of Amaury, Count of Montfort, and his wife Beatrix de Viennois. John and Marguerite had:

- Marie de Nesle (d. after 1272), married to Guy de Saint-Rémy
- John IV, Count of Soissons
- Daughter, name unknown, married Eustache IV de Conflans, Seigneur de Mareuil, son of Eustache III de Conflans
- Raoul de Nesle (killed in the battle of Courtrai, 11 July 1302)
- Auchier de Nesle
- Hugh de Nesle, d.1306

== Sources ==
- DeVries, Kelly (2006). Infantry Warfare in the Early Fourteenth Century: Discipline, Tactics, and Technology. The Boydell Press.
- Griffiths, Quentin (1993). "The Nesles of Picardy in the Service of the Last Capetians". Francia. 20 (1): 69–78.
- Newman, William Mendel (1971). Les seigneurs de Nesle en Picardie (XIIe-XIIIe siècle): Recueil des Chartes (in French). Edition A. & J. Picard.
- Dormay, C., Histoire de la ville de Soissons et de ses rois, ducs, comtes et gouverneurs, Soissons, 1664 (available on Google Books)
