= Raynald II of Soissons =

Renaud II (died 1099), son of William Busac, Count of Eu and Soissons, and Adelaide, Countess of Soissons. Count of Soissons.

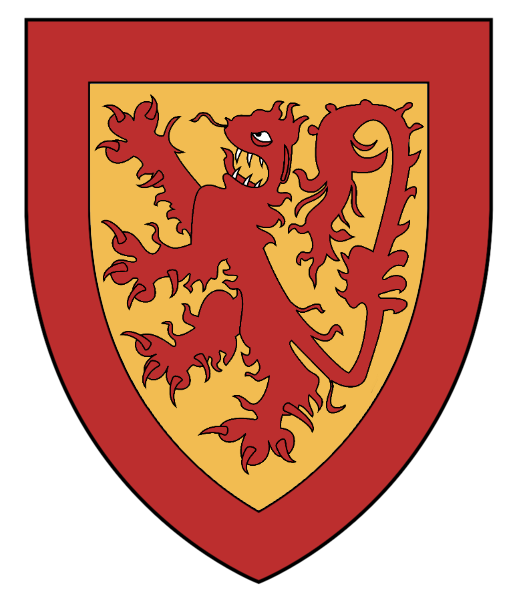
Arms of Renaud II

It is unclear when Renaud assumed the countship of Soissons from his disgraced father. The latter was stripped of the County of Eu in 1050 but it is unclear when he relinquished the countship of Soissons. Alberic of Trois-Fontaines identifies Renaud in his Chronicles but little is known about his rule.

It is not known whether Renaud married or had any children. Upon the death of Renaud, his brother John became the Count of Soissons.

== Sources ==
Dormay, C., Histoire de la ville de Soissons et de ses rois, ducs, comtes et gouverneurs, Soissons, 1664 (available on Google Books)
