= John IV of Soissons =

Count of Soissons from 1286 to 1302

John IV (died before May 1302), son of John III, Count of Soissons, and Marguerite of Montfort, daughter of Amaury VI, Count of Montfort. Count of Soissons, inherited upon his father’s death in 1286.

John married Marguerite of Rumigny, daughter of Hugh II of Rumigny and his wife Philippa. John and Marguerite had two children:

- John V, Count of Soissons
- Hugh Count of Soissons.

Upon John’s death in 1302, his son and namesake became count.

== Sources ==
Dormay, C., Histoire de la ville de Soissons et de ses rois, ducs, comtes et gouverneurs, Soissons, 1664 (available on Google Books)
