= Siege of Soissons =

Battle during the Franco-Prussian War

- Part of the Franco-Prussian War
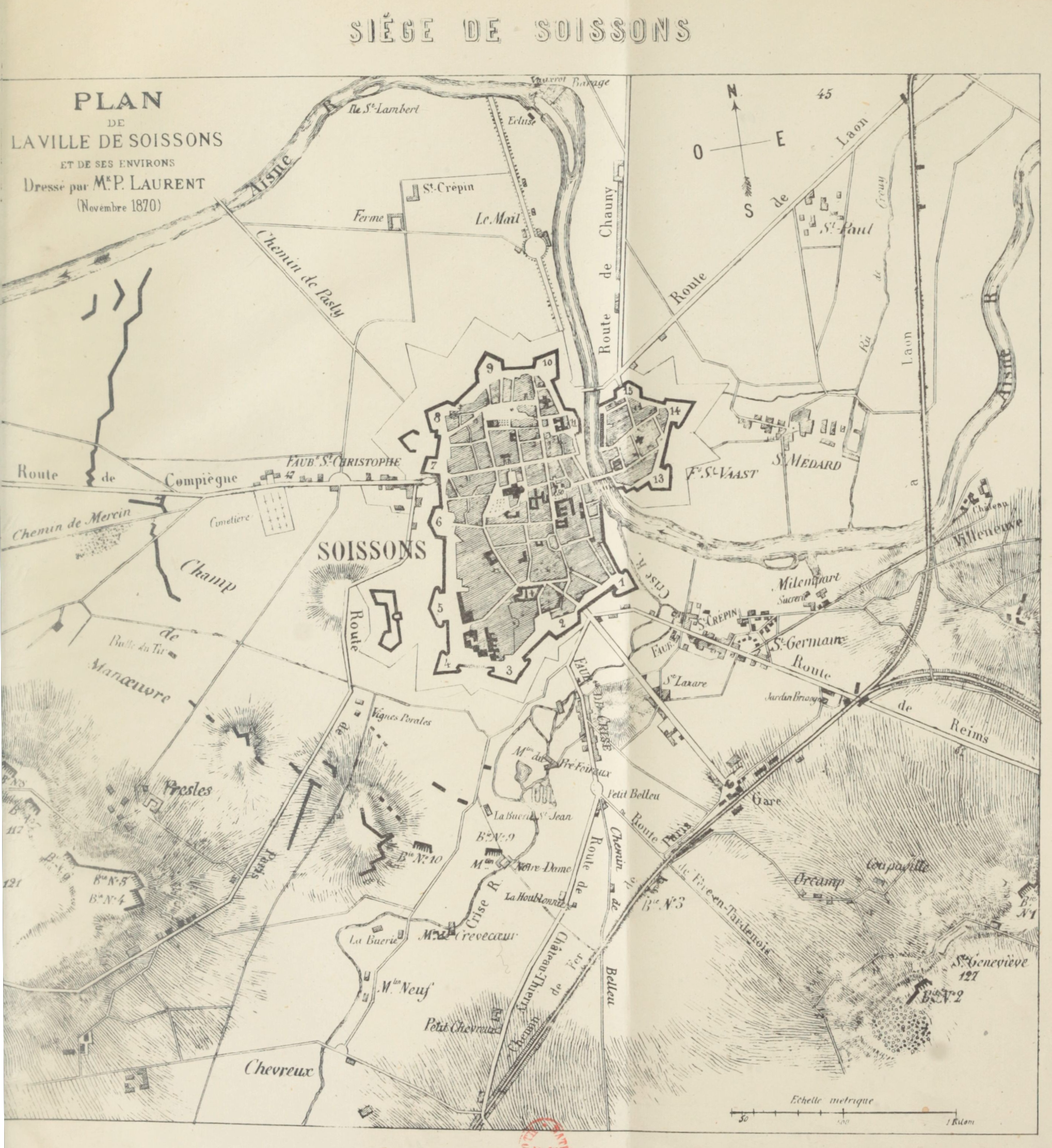
- Map of the Siege of Soissons, 1870
Date	September 11 – October 16, 1870
Location	Soissons, Aisne, France
Result	German victory

Belligerents
French Republic	North German Confederation: Prussia

Commanders and leaders
Duke de Fitzjames	Frederick Francis II; Major General Von Selchow

Strength
4,000 – 5,000 troops stationed in defense	20,000 troops

Casualties and losses
3,800 soldiers captured 128 artillery pieces destroyed 8,000 small arms and many food stores seized	120 soldiers killed

The Siege of Soissons (11 September 1870 – 16 October 1870) was a military engagement during the Franco-Prussian War, ending with the capitulation of Soissons.

== Background ==
In 1870, the population of Soissons was 10,000, including both civilians and military. Following the Battle of Sedan, the Prussians advanced on Paris with parts of the Army of the Meuse. They then moved through the region and proceeded to surround Soissons on September 11, 1870. The French garrison stationed inside the fortress rejected initial Prussian demands to surrender, paving the way for a month-long siege.

Due to the topography of the area and the strength of the fortress, Prussian forces decided to besiege Soissons. Because the main Prussian advance on Paris had to be sped up, the frontline infantry - including the Prussian IV Corps - marched past the city. In their place, smaller cavalry detachments and reserve formations were left behind to isolate the fortress and keep Soissons under observation.

On September 6, in anticipation of the Prussian advance, French forces executed scorched earth tactics around Soissons. The bridges between Villeneuve-Saint-Germain, Saint-Mard, Aisne, Missy-sur-Aisne, and Condere were destroyed. The French also detonated and collapsed sections of both the Vauxaillon and Vierzy railway tunnels.

On September 9, the presence of the White Cuirassiers 4th Corps, commanded by General Alvensleben, was reported in the district of Soissons. Following this, the Prussians sent their troops to the Wailly bridge, as it had not yet been destroyed.

== Fortress modification ==
Soissons' location was considered strategically important due to its position at the junction of three major roads and two railways, connecting Paris to both Reims and Laon by the Villers-Cotterêts. In addition, Soissons' bridge over the Aisne provided a convenient path to Paris. As the mountains surrounding Soissons were devoid of fortified works, the town was deemed tactically disadvantageous. On the eve of the war, Soissons was considered the "key to Paris" and represented one of the second-line strongholds on France's northeastern border. However, no preparations had been measured to bring the stronghold to a state of readiness consistent with its attributed strategic importance.

The fortifications within Soissons consisted of a continuous wall covered with 11 bastions. The enclosure was casemated in various places, but had not been designed to shelter the garrison. It was based on the Aisne to the north and to the south and formed a quadrilateral of approximately 1,200 meters by 800 meters. The Saint-Vaast suburb was not included in this quadrilateral but formed an enclosure leaning on the Aisne to the east and was covered with three bastions.

Two nearby valleys were partially flooded, alongside most of the ditches in the area. The floodwater was redirected from a military dam and nearby depression. Only a portion of the ditches in the southwest, due to their higher position, could not be flooded. These actions delayed Prussian advances for a time, but ultimately, Soissons was unable to withstand a prolonged siege.

== Garrison ==
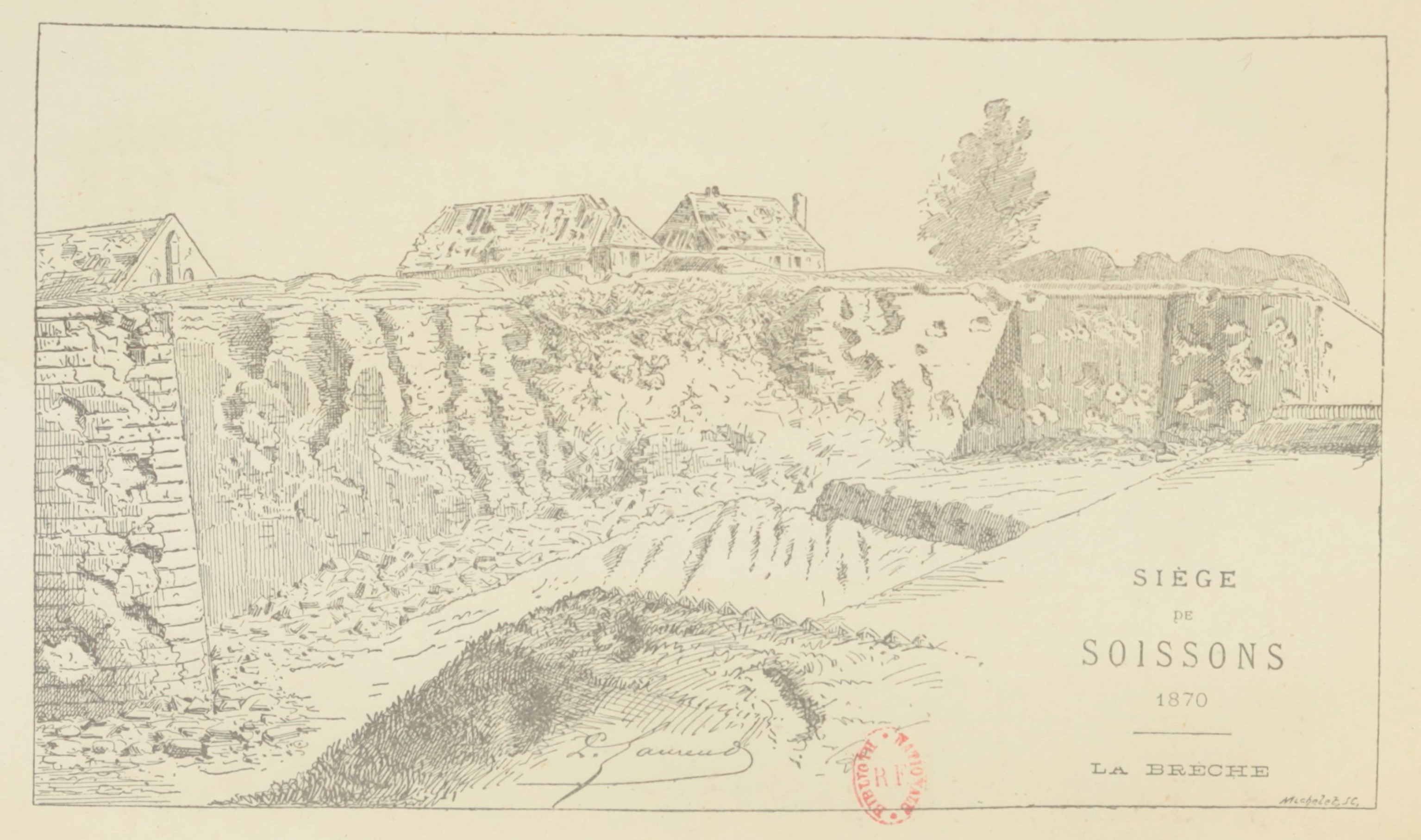
Illustration of the Fort of Soissons after the siege (Paul Laurent, 1870)

At the time of the declaration of war, the garrison of Soissons consisted of three battalions of the 15th Line Infantry Regiment, under the orders of Colonel Théodore Eugène Fraboulet de Kerléadec. The garrison was, however, without artillery teams. On July 20, the 15th RIL left Soissons to join the Army of the Rhine. On July 22, the arrival of brigades spoiler Sonnay and Colin of 3 E Division 6th Army Corps of the Army of the Rhine under the orders of General Lafond de Villiers, who joined on August 2nd the Châlons camp. From August 2 to the 10, the area was entirely unguarded. On August 11, under the Decree of July 17, 1870, which called the mobile guards under the flags, the 2nd mobile battalion of the Aisne (district of Soissons) garrisoned there. On August 12th, the 1st Battalion of mobile Aisne (district of Château-Thierry) arrived. On August 17, the 6th mobile battalion of Aisne (district of Vervins) arrived. At around the same date, the depot battalion of the 15th line infantry regiment arrived from Laon. The battalion was made up of 2 companies of 800 men each, with barely 10 officers to command them. They were reinforced by elements escaped from Sedan, which formed 2 additional companies. On August 20, the 1st battery of the 8th artillery regiment arrived. On August 27, the 1st Battalion of the Aisne Mobile was sent to Villers-Cotterêts and Paris. That same day, the government recalled former soldiers aged 25 to 35, who were armed with old piston rifles, and created the rural national guards. These were transformed into marching regiments. Thus, the 2 battalions of Soissons formed the 17th marching regiment.

At the start of the siege, the city was defended by around 4,425 men:

1 engineering section of Exéa's division (30 men), 1 battery piece of the 8th artillery regiment (115 men) the Northern Mobile Artillery (230 men), the 12th North Mobile Artillery Battery, the 3rd North Mobile Artillery Battery, the 16th North Mobile Artillery Battery Soissonnais volunteer battery (50 men), the Deposit Company of the 15th Line Infantry Regiment 2nd Battalion mobile Aisne (1,200 men), and the 6th battalion of mobile Aisne (1,200 men).

With the total workforce of around 550 men:

1 company of firefighters, 1 company of volunteer national guards, about 15 gendarmes and 122 artillery pieces, of which only 51 were usable. This improvised troop, under the command of Lieutenant-Colonel de Noue, was made up largely of volunteers who lacked armament, equipment, instruction and discipline. The officers were non-commissioned officers and corporals appointed hastily.

== Siege ==
=== Prelude ===
Ignoring the city, the German army continued its march towards Paris, advancing along local roads of the region and putting other targets aside for a later occasion in order not to slow down its march. This approach hastened the journey, as from Sedan to Paris, the Germans did not meet any French soldiers; only two fortified towns, Laon and Soissons, lay in their path.

=== September ===
The city of Laon, commanded by General Thémérin, had a garrison consisting of only a battalion and a battery of artillery of the mobile guard. However, on September 8th, a strong detonation coming from the direction of Laon had been heard in Soissons; it was the powder keg that had blown. According to a contemporary report, the fortress of Soissons had received no orders or help from the French government since the Battle of Sedan on 1 September 1870, leaving the garrison isolated and without direction from Paris. On September 10th, a parliamentary dragoon officer of the 12th army corps appeared at the Porte Saint-Martin to request the surrender of Soissons. Colonel de Noue, the commander at Soissons, refused.

The long German columns continued to march around Soissons, towards Paris, and the city was promptly surrounded. On September 14th, a group of German cavalrymen attempted a reconnaissance on the Porte de Reims. They were driven out by cannon and rifle fire. The same day, a second parliamentarian demanded the surrender of the fort. In response to a new refusal, the Germans fired 3 cannon shots on the city from the heights of Sainte-Geneviève. On September 18th, warned by an inhabitant, a platoon of national guards in Venizel were surprised. On the same day, a detachment of about twenty Prussians was dispatched; one was killed, and the rest were taken prisoner. On September 22nd, 42 national guards carried out a coup de main against some German riders accompanying about sixty horses confined in to Beugneux; 1 officer and 2 German soldiers were killed, 18 were taken prisoner, and 50 horses captured.

On September 24th, 40 National Guards and the 15th line fire on the Prussian cavalry in The Cottage in Venizel. Alerted, a Prussian battalion, joined by 3 battalions of the Landwehr, forced the National Guards to fall back after a hard fight on the hill of Villeneuve. 2 French officers were killed, 8 men were wounded and 16 went missing; the Prussians suffered 2 dead and 15 wounded. Following this engagement, the Grand Duke of Mecklenburg, Frederick Francis II of Mecklenburg-Schwerin, sent the following telegram from Reims to the Ministry of War in Berlin:

On Saturday, we had a serious engagement under the walls of Soissons, after a four-hour fight, we forced the enemy to return to the city after having suffered great losses, the commander of the place asked for an armistice for bury his dead, we refused him.

— Duke Mecklenburg

A parliamentarian summoned Colonel de Noue again to return him the city, and faced with a new refusal, the German troops made their arrangements to invade the place by installing grand guard positions, they placed battalions on the Sainte-Geneviève plateau, in Billy-sur-Aisne and Venizel, and built shelters and defense works.

From September 25th, the Prussian positions were bombarded by the French cannons. However, this did not prevent the Prussians from extending their supply lines and occupying the station, which had been abandoned by the French. On September 26th, 200 men of the 15th line, accompanied by 100 men of the 2nd Battalion mobile Aisne, went out to chase the Prussians in the suburb of Reims and burn their shelters. Unable to flush out the Germans, the attackers returned to the square after having lost 2 men and 2 being wounded, while the enemy had lost 8 men. On September 27th, fire was set in the foundry and part of the houses in the Faubourg Saint-Crépin, in order to dislodge and drive away the Germans that were too close to the city walls, while many soldiers who had escaped from Sedan were arriving. On September 28th, the garrison tried to occupy the suburb of Reims and the station, which was stopped by the Prussians after 2 hours of fighting.

=== October ===
On October 1st, Lieutenant-General von Selchow arrived in front of Soissons to lead the siege, with reinforcements made up of 7 infantry battalions, 4 cavalry squadrons, 2 field artillery batteries, and 2 pioneer companies. He established his headquarters at Carrière-l'Évêque, located behind Belleu and on the hill. He extended and reinforced the line of investment on the left bank of the Aisne and brought it as close as possible to the French outposts. The Maison-Rouge farm was occupied, as well as the cemetery blocking the road to Compiègne, through which the French troops had been able to leave until then. The right bank was occupied by 2 companies of landwehr and a squadron of white cuirassiers. The infantry positioned themselves at Crouy, Clémencin and behind the Laon railway embankment, with the cavalry at La Perrière in order to monitor the roads to Chauny and Laon. On October 3rd, a food convoy made up of 18 cars managed to enter the square after the French troops stationed in Soissons had opened the passage to Crouy:

To ensure the entry of supplies, Colonel Carpentier left with 6 companies taken in the two battalions of the mobile guard, and moved to the heights of Vauxrot. After having made the position clear and having settled down, he directed a company on Terny which brought the convoy into the place. To make the move, and clear the road of Laon, Ballet captain came out with 3 companies of the 15 th line . Lieutenant Ferté of the 1re company is focused on the farm St. Paul, Lieutenant Garnier of 2 th company on Clamecy Captain Felon, recruitment of the Aisne, with 3 e company supported this offensive movement, which took place with a remarkable whole. The enemy flushed out by a very strong fire, withdrew in disorder on the village of Crouy, pursued by about twenty skirmishers who took 6 prisoners, including 1 wounded. Our soldiers then occupied the ridges of the railroad embankment until they arrived in town. The losses are 1 killed and 3 wounded. Soissons on October 3, 1870.

— De Noue, commandant of the place

On October 5th, by order of Colonel de Noue, the Vailly bridge was destroyed. "By order of the superior commander, the Vailly bridge must be destroyed. The guardian of the bridge, under penalty of treason, will have to let the order be carried out, if he warns the enemy, he will be brought before a council of war and shot. Soissons October 4, 1870. Signed De Noue."

On October 6th, informed of the destruction of the bridge, a detachment of around forty German cavalrymen entered Vailly and proceeded to arrest the mayor M. Mennessier and the councilor general of the canton M. Legry who were accused of "Criminal acts punished by the 4th paragraph of the Royal Order of 21 July 1867 and the rescript of paragraph 18 of the military Penal Code." The Prussians were taken to General de Selchow's headquarters at Carrière-l'Evêque, where he rendered the following judgment:

The town of Vailly will pay 20,000 francs as a fine for the act of hostility committed on its territory; one of the two prisoners will go to Vailly to get the money, the other will stay until his return, which will take place today.

— General de Selchow

From October 7th to October 11th, the clashes continued: the besieged carried out harassment and bombing of outposts, while the besiegers, numbering 6,000 infantry, tightened their grip around the square.

On the left bank of the Aisne, from Venizel to the Crisis, there were 3 battalions and 1 light battery at the Château de Bellevue and at the Sainte-Geneviève farm, with the HQ in Billy-sur-Aisne. From the left bank of the Crisis to the Aisne, there were 3 battalions and 2 squadrons, with HQ in Vaux Buin. On the right bank of the Aisne, there was 1 battalion, 1 squadron and 1 battery, with the HQ at Ferme de la Perrière. A strong barricade, built by the Germans, cut off the road to Chauny, in anticipation of an exit of the besieged to the North. The line of outposts on the left bank started from the railway bridge near Villeneuve, followed the railway through the already dug trench to the station, then behind and after the Faubourg de la Crise, then passed in front of the mill of Buerie, the farms of Presle, Maupas and the Maison-Rouge on the road to Compiègne. The Germans built batteries to receive siege guns; on October 12, the German artillery opened fire on Soissons. It was made up of:

4 fortress artillery companies (480 men), 2 reserve field batteries (320 men), 10 x 150 steel cannons 16 guns of 120 in bronze, 6 guns of 90 (field artillery), 6 x 80 guns (field artillery), 2 mortars of 270 (taken in Toul or Marsal), 4 mortars of 220 (taken in Toul or Marsal) 4 mortars of 150 (taken in Toul or Marsal)

To which were added:

9 infantry battalions (7,200 men), 4 large cavalry squadrons (500 men), 2 pioneer companies (600 men), The first shells fell on the front 3–4, the cavalier 27 and the arsenal.

From the morning of October 12, a continuous cannonade of 73 German pieces shook the ground, destroyed houses, started fires and caused considerable damage and loss of life. Despite the obstinacy with which the defenders responded, it lasted until the end of the day. On that day the Germans sent 1,864 shells, 184 shrapnel shells and 300 bombs. On October 13, the cannonade increased pressure, and many more projectiles fell on the large barracks and civilian homes, causing new fires. At the beginning of the afternoon, a German parliamentarian appeared before Colonel de Noue, who replied:

"That his duty and his honor did not allow him to capitulate, that the garrison was intact and ready to fight, that the pieces were recovered and ready to fire and that he was waiting for the Germans to assault the breach; he complained bitterly to the parliamentarian that the Germans were shooting at the city and the ambulances, although they were protected by the flag of the Geneva Convention, and that the siege was conducted in an inhumane manner since the fire was directed as much on the city as on the ramparts."

It was the fourth time that Colonel de Noue refused to surrender. The bombardment of the city resumed with a vengeance and with increased intensity. The Grand-Hôpital, which gave asylum to 300 people, caught fire under repeated blows from German artillery. The blows dealt by the besieger in this second day of bombardment were serious. On that day the Germans sent 1,993 shells, 225 shrapnels and 294 bombs. On October 14th, the human losses were less important; however the barracks, bastions numbered 3, 4, and 5 suffered heavy damage as well as the northern part of the fortifications whose German guns had breached from 33 to 35 meters and where an assault was now feared. Numerous letters addressed by the inhabitants of Soissons asked Colonel de Noue to stop this siege and to capitulate in order to put an end to the destruction, disasters, fires and victims. Mayor Henri Salleron also protested Lieutenant-Colonel de Noue against the bombardment:

"We should have expected," said the members of the municipal commission, "to endure a regular siege, but we should not believe that fifty hours of bombardment, with formidable devices, on positions which command the city on all sides, had to surrender almost useless any regular defense and wipe out much of the city," which went unanswered. These letters remained without effect.

On October 15th, Henri Salleron sent a new missive to the military commander, giving a full account of the situation:

"Ruin, death and famine, this is the fate no longer of a third of the population but of more than half; only two districts are privileged until this hour: those surrounding the Place d'Armes and the Town Hall and most of the Faubourg Saint-Waast. Services of any kind become impossible; we can no longer even bury the dead and we no longer want to go get our bread. The inhabitants who have a habitable cellar, can remain locked there and put their existence in the shelter, but half of the population is obliged to await death in the houses, and if one bombed the suburb, it does not there is not a cellar that is not flooded, so no refuge. Besides, Colonel, I don't want to try to move you; I fully share your thoughts on the sacrifices imposed by patriotism, I appeal only to reason and, no more than you, I am not prepared to compromise with the enemy. Only, I understand all the possible sacrifices, life and fortune, only on condition of believing them useful. God knows if the present situation has not covered your military responsibility since yesterday. I had, not without difficulty, opened ditches at the place indicated, but, at two feet, we encountered water. As there are deaths of five days, I took it upon myself to have pits opened in the Jeu de Paume. (At the foot of the curtain wall 8–9, the corpses were brought in dumpers, 47 dead were thus buried and later transported to the city cemetery) on the condition of believing them useful. God knows if the present situation has not covered your military responsibility since yesterday. I had, not without difficulty, opened ditches at the place indicated, but, at two feet, we encountered water. As there are deaths of five days, I took it upon myself to have pits opened in the Jeu de Paume (At the foot of the curtain wall 8-9, the corpses were brought in dumpers, 47 dead were thus buried and later transported to the city cemetery) " on the condition of believing them useful.

In the afternoon, not having succeeded in deciding Colonel de Noue, Henri Salleron completed his presentation:

"It is certain that you are unaware of the material state of our Hôtel-Dieu and our ambulances. If you want to visit them, you will see the most awful sight. 500 sick and wounded, threatened with asphyxiation in the cellars, are piled up on top of each other; in the corners, children and old people; more supplies following the hospital fire. In Saint-Léger, 150 wounded or sick piled up in the crypt. Since morning, I have been trying to accommodate the families driven from their homes by the fire and the destruction. I did what I could, but I won't find any more asylum. The fires continue, and I believe that no city has endured so much ruin and misery with more resignation. Up to you to enjoy."

Lieutenant-Colonel de Noue did not see the assistance arriving which he had had requested in Lille to Lieutenant-Colonel Carpentier. The extreme volume of requests addressed to him, and of the desperate situation in which the place found itself prevented this. He decided to consult the members of the Defense Council on the course to be taken, inviting them to each give their opinion, either for resistance or for capitulation. This meeting of the Defense Council was quite eventful and above all very painful for the local commander. Knowing that a long resistance was not possible and that new sacrifices were completely useless, Colonel de Noue decided to surrender of the city, as to end further destruction of the area. On October 16th, at around 2 a.m., Colonel von Krensky carried the protocol of surrender:

"1- Colonel von Krensky, Chief of Staff of 13th Army Corps, charged the full powers of his Royal Highness the Grand Duke of Mecklenburg

2 - Lieutenant-Colonel de Noue, commander of the Place de Soissons. Article 1: The Place de Soissons with all the material it contains will be made available to HRH the Grand Duke of Mecklenburg. Article 2: The garrison of Soissons, comprising all the men who bore arms during the defense, whether in uniform or not, is a prisoner of war, are excepted from this article the national guards and the mobile guards who lived in the city before war was declared. Article 3: In consideration of the valiant defense of the place, all officers and senior employees with officer rank, who will undertake in writing their word of honor to no longer bear arms against Germany, nor to act in nothing against his interests during the war, will be released. Those who agree to these conditions will keep their weapons, their horses, their effects and their servants. Article 4: Tomorrow, at two o'clock, the garrison, unarmed, will be led to the glacis of the Porte de Reims. Article 5: The war material, including flags, cannons, arms, horses, caissons, ammunition, etc., etc., will be delivered at three o'clock by the heads of departments to a Prussian commission. Article 6: All the military doctors will stay to treat the wounded. Article 7: In consideration of what the city has suffered, it will not suffer any other contribution than that of feeding the garrison, after exhaustion of the supplies left in the state stores. Done at Soissons, at eleven o'clock in the evening, on October 15, 1870.

Signed: von Krensky and de Noue"

== End of siege ==
The municipal commission, informed by the local commander, had the following notice posted in town which informed the inhabitants of the capitulation of Soissons:

"The Municipal Commission was informed this morning, October 16, by the Commandant of Place de Soissons that, after hearing the Defense Council, and taking into consideration the suffering of the city, he had to sign the surrender of the square, which will be handed over to the Prussian authorities today at two o'clock; and, as regards the city that, according to an article of the convention, it will not have to undergo any war remuneration than that of feeding the garrison, after the exhaustion of the provisions left in the stores of the 'State. The members of the Municipal Commission recommend to their fellow citizens the attitude and calm demanded by the sad necessities of the situation."

Under the pretext that they did not want to leave anything to the Germans, the soldiers stormed the state stores and turned them over to plunder; a certain number went to the reserves of wine and brandy. In the work of the German General Staff we find the following passage: "In the afternoon of the 16th, the prisoner garrison, approximately 4,800 men strong, left by the Porte de Reims, drunk for the most part and in quite a mess."

The 2nd and 6th battalions of Aisne Mobile were reviewed by a German officer, who went free after giving them knowledge of the article on the act of surrender, and have meant that they were no longer to serve against Germany during this war. What was noteworthy was that almost all the men of these battalions, once free, hastened to reach the North and enlist to fight the invaders. The soldiers passed in front of the German troops lined up in line on the avenue de la Gare and left for Germany by the road to Chateau-Thierry, under the leadership of the landwehr battalion of Jüterbogk and a squadron of cavalry. The Prussians, as the last prisoner had passed, began the procession for the entry into the town with all their troops.

The convoy of prisoners were taken towards Oulchy-le-Château, where they spent the night. When crossing into Saint-Jean-aux-Bois, located between Hartennes and Oulchy, under the cover of darkness, the convoy executed their escape plans. At the signal, men rushed into the woods and disappeared. The Prussian soldiers, forming the hedge, fired, killing several prisoners. The front and rear platoons, believing they were under attack from snipers, also fired, causing to the platoons to shoot each other. A general panic ensued, allowing some 600 prisoners to escape. The prisoners passed by rail from Château-Thierry to Bar-le-Duc then Lunéville and arrived in their place of internment, Cologne, on the evening of October 20th.

== Aftermath ==
The Prussian occupation of the city of Soissons lasted for 12 months.

After the war, a council of inquiry, appointed by the French government, was charged, under the presidency of Marshal Baraguay-d'Hilliers, to examine the capitulations of the strongholds which succumbed to the attacks of the Germans.

Below is the extract from the minutes of the meeting of November 13, 1871 relating to the surrender of Soissons:

"The board,

Having regard to the file relating to the surrender of the Place de Soissons; Considering the text of the capitulation; On the report that was made to him; Ouï M. de Noue, lieutenant-colonel, commander of the place of Soissons; M. Mosbach, battalion commander, engineer commander; Mr. Roques-Salvaza, squadron leader, commanding the artillery; M. Denis, major of the 15th of the line, and M. Fargeon, captain of engineers, employed at Soissons during the siege. Considering that although Lieutenant-Colonel de Noue, commanding the Place de Soissons, showed activity in the provision of food, he did not deploy enough severity to maintain discipline in the troops placed under his control. orders. That he lacked foresight by authorizing several chefs de corps to be absent when the place could be taken over, and thereby harmed discipline and esprit de corps. Considering that if the body of the place has been breached; the breach was not practicable; that if the artillery had suffered, it could still continue the defense; that the ammunition for food and war was abundant; that the losses of the garrison were relatively small; that the commander of the place is to blame for having capitulated without having pinned his guns, destroyed his powders and his provisions, and, on the contrary, undertook to deliver them to the enemy; Considering that the place was returned in spite of the opinion of the commander of the 15th of line and that of the commander of the engineers, and that, far from rallying to this opinion, the lieutenant-colonel de Noue, contrary to article 156 of the decree on the service of the places, knew how to impose its will only for the capitulation; Considering that he breached the prescriptions of the same article, by stipulating that the officers who gave their word not to serve against Germany, would be set free and that they would keep arms, horses and baggage, while he was to stipulate that in favor of the wounded and sick; Is of the opinion: That Lieutenant-Colonel de Noue has revealed a deep incapacity and a great weakness, and that he seems to the Council unfit to exercise a command. For compliant extract, The Chairman of the Board of Inquiry,

Signed: Baraguay-d'Hilliers".

In 1885, the city of Soissons was declassified, chiefly due to the considerable extension of its defense system, the expenses incurred for the defensive reorganization as well as the secondary role of the place. On March 5, 1885, the city of Soissons was removed from the classification table of places of war.

== Bibliography ==
- D Vincent: Souvenir of a soldier from 1870. Siege of Soissons
- René Fossé d'Arcosse: The siege of Soissons in 1870
- Émile Collet: The siege of Soissons and the German occupation in the Soissonnais 1870-1871
