= Soissons Cathedral =

Cathedral located in Aisne, France

Cathedral of Saints Gervasius and Protasius
- Cathédrale Saint-Gervais-et-Saint-Protais
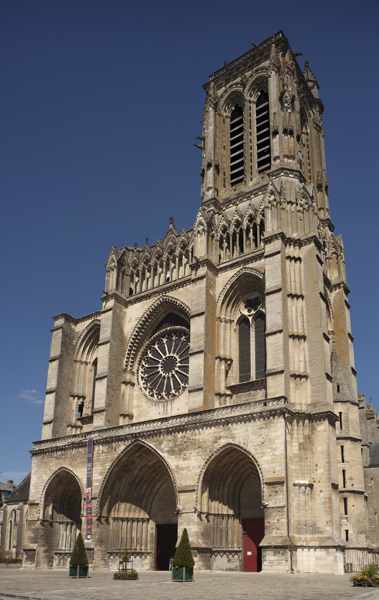
- Soissons Cathedral
- Cathedral of Saints Gervasius and Protasius
- 49.3808°N 3.3252°E
- Location: Soissons, France
- Denomination: Roman Catholic
- Churchmanship: Roman Rite

History
- Status: Cathedral-Basilica

Architecture
- Architectural type: Church
- Style: Gothic
- Groundbreaking: 1177
- Completed: 1479

Specifications
- Length: 116 m (380 ft 7 in)
- Height: 66 m (216 ft 6 in)

Administration
- District: Diocese of Soissons, Laon, and Saint-Quentin

Monument historique
- Official name: Cathédrale Saint-Gervais-et-Saint-Protais
- Type: Classé
- Designated: 1840
- Reference no.: PA00115941

Soissons Cathedral (French: Cathédrale Saint-Gervais-et-Saint-Protais) is a Roman Catholic cathedral basilica in Soissons, France. It is the seat of the Bishop of Soissons, Laon, and Saint-Quentin. Soissons Cathedral was classified as a historical monument in 1840 and is currently owned by the French State, with the Catholic Church having the exclusive rights of use.

== History ==
The origins of Soissons Cathedral date to the 4th century, when the diocese of Soissons was first established. The first cathedral was constructed in a Romanesque style and saw events such as the crowning of Pepin the Short in 752. To accommodate the growing city around the church, the Romanesque structure was demolished, and a second Carolingian cathedral was built on the site, consecrated in 851 by Bishop Rothade. This structure suffered significant fire damage in 948 caused by the troops of Hugh the Great.

To replace the burned-out church, the construction of the third and current cathedral was ordered in 1176 under the episcopate of Nivelon de Quierzy. The cathedral was constructed rather quickly in a Gothic architecture style based on Chartres Cathedral, with the completion of the choir and clerestory in 1211, followed by the nave two hundred years later. In 1414, the Burgundians besieged the city and allowed the inhabitants of Soissons to seize stones from the construction site to repair their damaged houses. As a result, the south tower was never completed, and the cathedral was permanently deprived of its north tower due to insufficient funding. After a pause of construction due to the Hundred Years' War, the cathedral was completed in the late 15th century, marked by a dedication ceremony conducted by Bishop Jean Milet on April 25, 1479. In 1567 and 1568, Protestant Huguenots occupied Soissons, breaking into the cathedral and destroying pieces of furniture, stained glass panels, and statues. However, unlike the nearby Abbey of Saint-Jean-des-Vignes, the cathedral was spared from complete destruction and survived through the 16th century. During the 1740s and 1750s, the cathedral was renovated under the direction of François de Fitz-James.

The French Revolution brought more destruction to the building, with the cathedral being closed in 1796 and stripped of its decorations. However, after being used as an army clothing store, the cathedral was reopened and returned to religious use in 1799, with the first restorations commenced by the first bishop Jean-Claude Le Blanc de Beaulieu. In 1840, further modifications and restorations to the gothic structure were completed, including the addition of new chapels and the renewal of the choir's decor and furniture lost in the French Revolution. After being used as an army clothing store, the church was reopened and returned to religious use in 1799. An explosion from a nearby gunpowder factory in 1815 caused further damage to the stained glass windows, requiring urgent restoration efforts. To save what was left of the windows, much of the remaining original stained glass panels were auctioned and sold to collectors.

Despite multiple structural restoration efforts lasting through the early 19th century, including the addition of new south transept buttresses and designation of the church as a national monument, the cathedral was badly damaged again during World War I, with key areas like the first three bays of the nave and the tower and roof being completely destroyed by artillery shelling. While most of the remaining stained glass windows were lost, the north transept and choir windows miraculously survived the war with minor damage. Major reconstruction was completed in May 1940, just before the surrender of France during World War II. However, unlike during the First World War, the cathedral was spared from major damage.

== Architecture ==
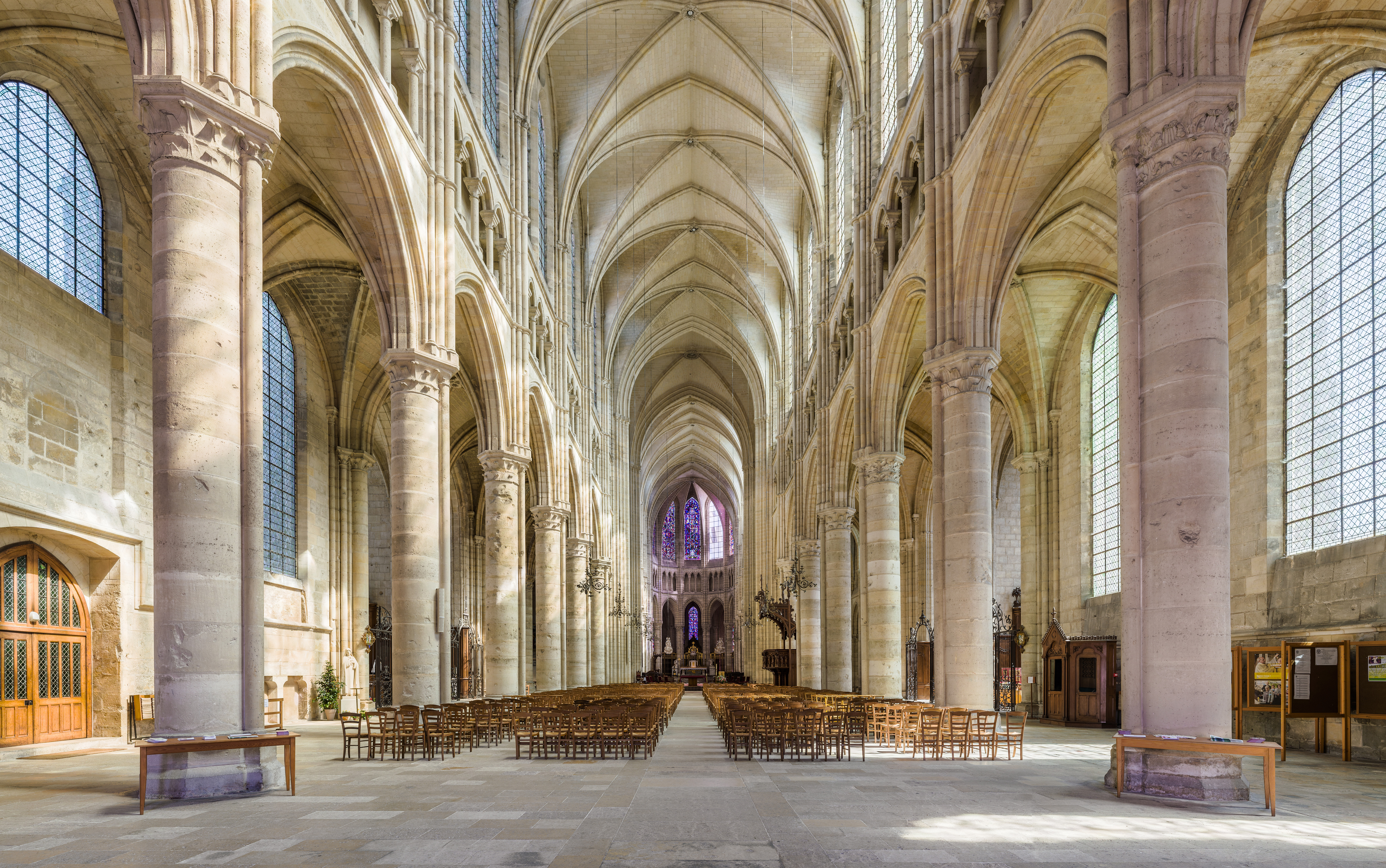
Nave of the cathedral

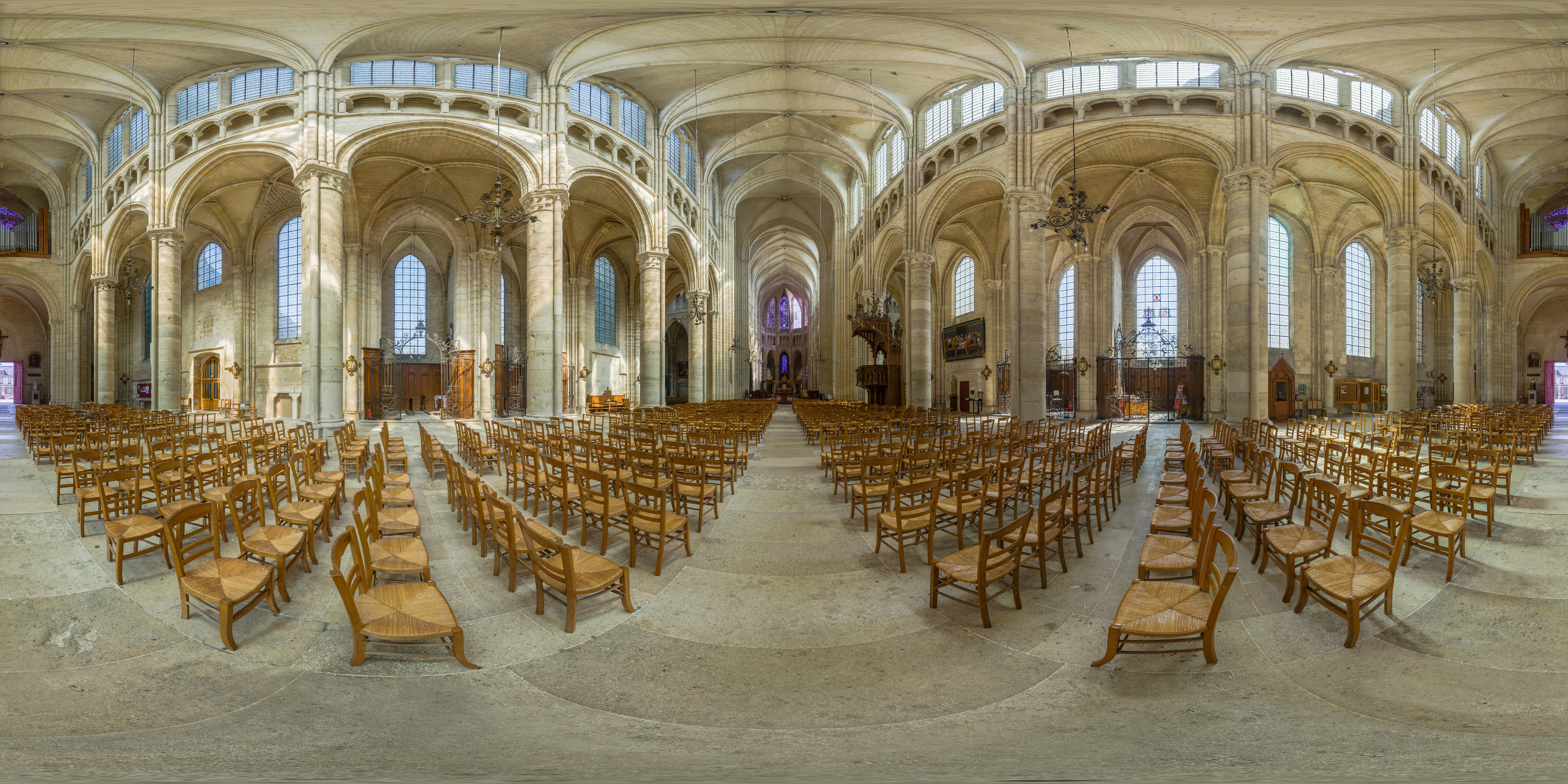
360 panorama of the interior of Soissons Cathedral (view as a 360° interactive panorama)

The facade and nave of the cathedral are constructed in the typical Gothic style seen in many 13th century French cathedrals. The southern transept, the oldest portion of the whole edifice, terminates in an apse, and unlike the rest of the building, is divided inside into four rather than three levels. The choir end of the cathedral contains 13th century stained glass, and a 15th century tapestry depicting the life of the martyrs Gervasius and Protasius, the patron saints of the cathedral. Rubens' Adoration of the Shepherds painting hangs in the northern transept in addition to another painting done by Philippe de Champaigne.

The single western tower dates from the mid-13th century and is an imitation of those of Notre-Dame de Paris, which it equals in height (66 metres (217 ft)). The tower was restored after it and part of the nave were severely damaged in World War I. A matching tower on the other side of the façade was originally planned, but never built.

Maurice Duruflé composed his work for organ "Fugue sur Le carillon des heures de la Cathédrale de Soissons" op. 12 (1962)

Some of the stained glass window panels from the cathedral auctioned to collectors during the 19th century were later donated to museums around the world, such as the Metropolitan Museum of Art in New York City, Walters Art Museum in Baltimore, Maryland, and the Isabella Stewart Gardner Museum in Boston.

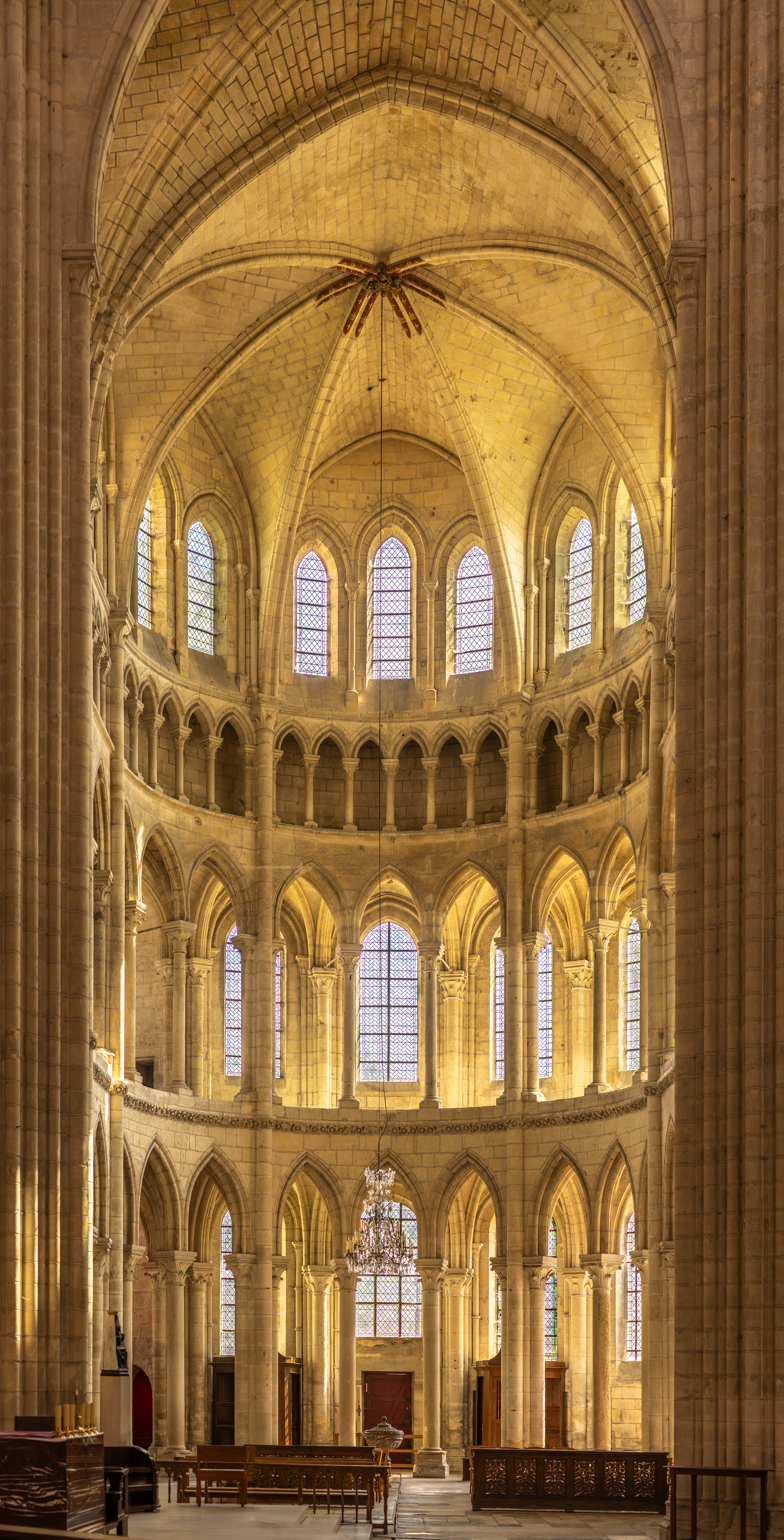
South transept of Soissons Cathedral.

== 2017 storm damage ==
On January 12, 2017, during a strong winter storm, winds collapsed in a significant portion of the west rose window. Large stone pieces of the window's tracery and sections of stained glass fell onto the tracker-action pipe organ located below the rose window, causing severe damage to the instrument.

== See also ==
- List of Gothic Cathedrals in Europe
