= Ralph, Count of Soissons =

Count of Soissons from 1180 to 1235

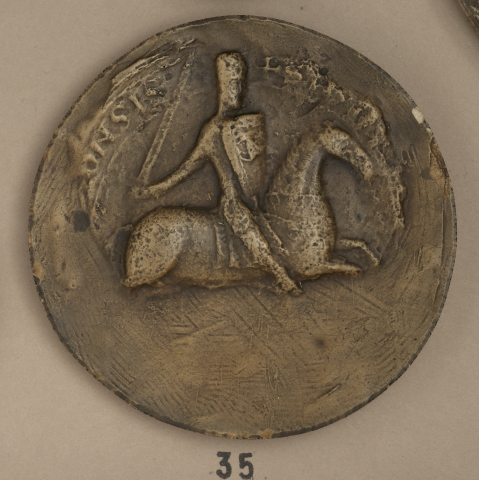
Ralph's seal

Ralph the Good (French: Raoul le Bon; died 4 January 1235), also known as Raoul III de Nesle, was the Count of Soissons from 1180. He was the third son of Raoul II de Nesle and Gertrude de Montaigu.

In 1178 Raoul and his elder brother John subscribed to a charter of the eldest brother, Conon, then count, donating property to Notre-Dame d'Ourscamp. When Alberic de Trois-Fontaines wrote his chronicle, he could refer to count Raoul of Soissons qui adhuc vivit (who still lives). But he later records his death in 1235. In 1184 Ralph became castellan of Noyon. According to Rigord, he took the Cross alongside Henry II of England and Philip II of France at a ceremony between Trie and Gisors on 13 Jan 1188 and joined the Third Crusade.

Raoul was the fourth husband of Adèle of Dreux (b. 1145/1146), daughter of Robert I of Dreux. She confirmed donations to Notre-Dame d'Ourscamp and Tremblay-en-France with him, and died between January 1205 and March 1210. Raoul was briefly married to a woman named Yolande, before taking as his third wife Ada d'Avesnes, widow of Henry, Count of Grandpré.

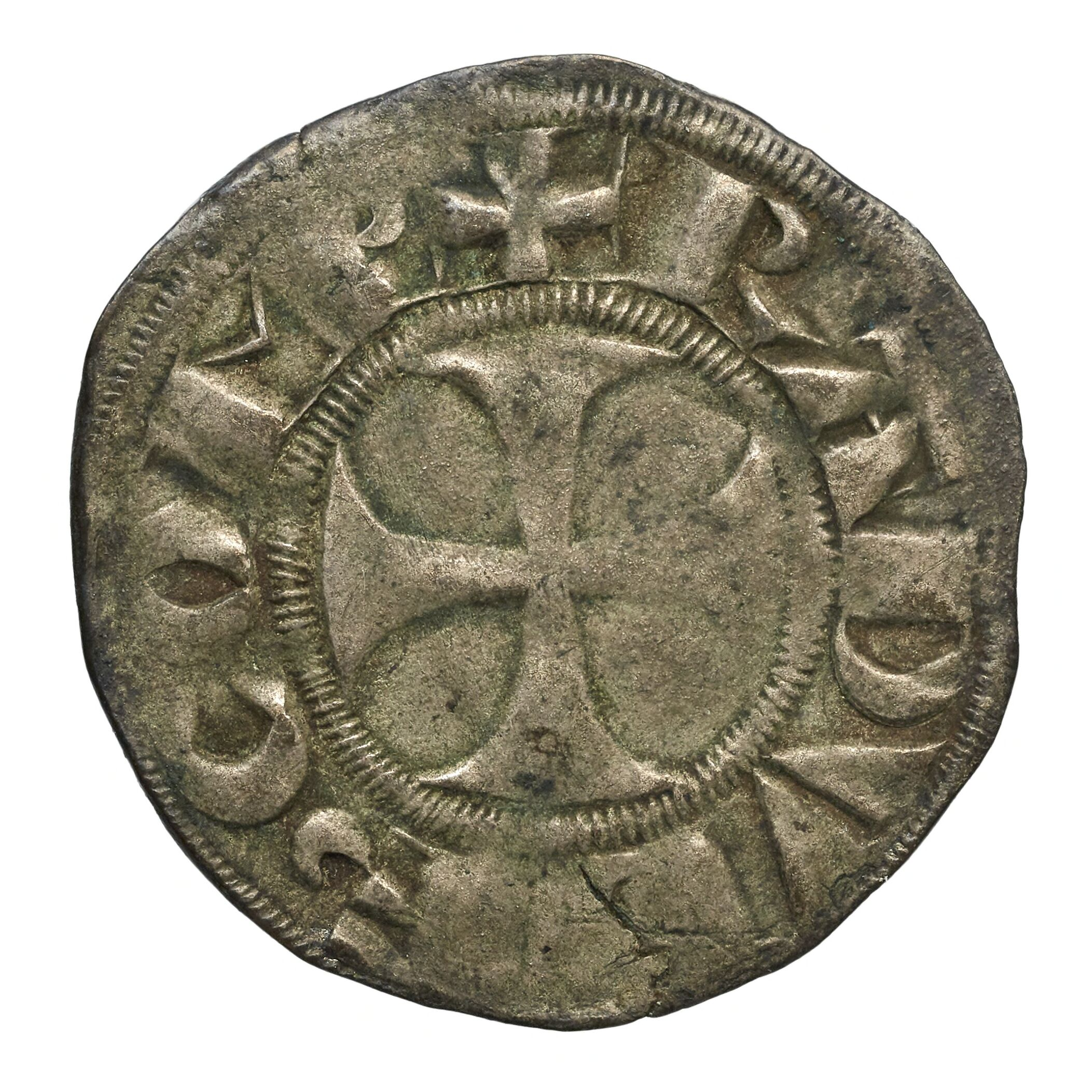
Coin minted by Ralph

Raoul and his first wife Adele he had:

- Gertrude, married first to Count Jean de Beaumont-sur-Oise (d. 1222), and second to Mathieu II de Montmorency (d.1230), Constable of France.
- Alienor, married first to Count Mathieu III de Beaumont-sur-Oise (d. 1208), and second to Étienne II de Sancerre (d. 1252), Grand Butler of France and son of Stephen I, Count of Sancerre.

By his third wife Ada he had three children:

- John, Count of Soissons
- Ralph (d. 1272), who was probably a trouvère (troubadour)
- Isabelle of Nesle, married to a Viscount of Châtellerault.

Upon the death of Raoul, his son John became Count of Soissons.

== Sources ==
- Griffiths, Quentin (1993). "The Nesles of Picardy in the Service of the Last Capetians". Francia. 20 (1): 69–78.
- Newman, William Mendel (1971). Les seigneurs de Nesle en Picardie (XIIe-XIIIe siècle): Recueil des Chartes (in French). Edition A. & J. Picard.
