= Soissons =

Subprefecture and commune in Hauts-de-France, France

- Subprefecture
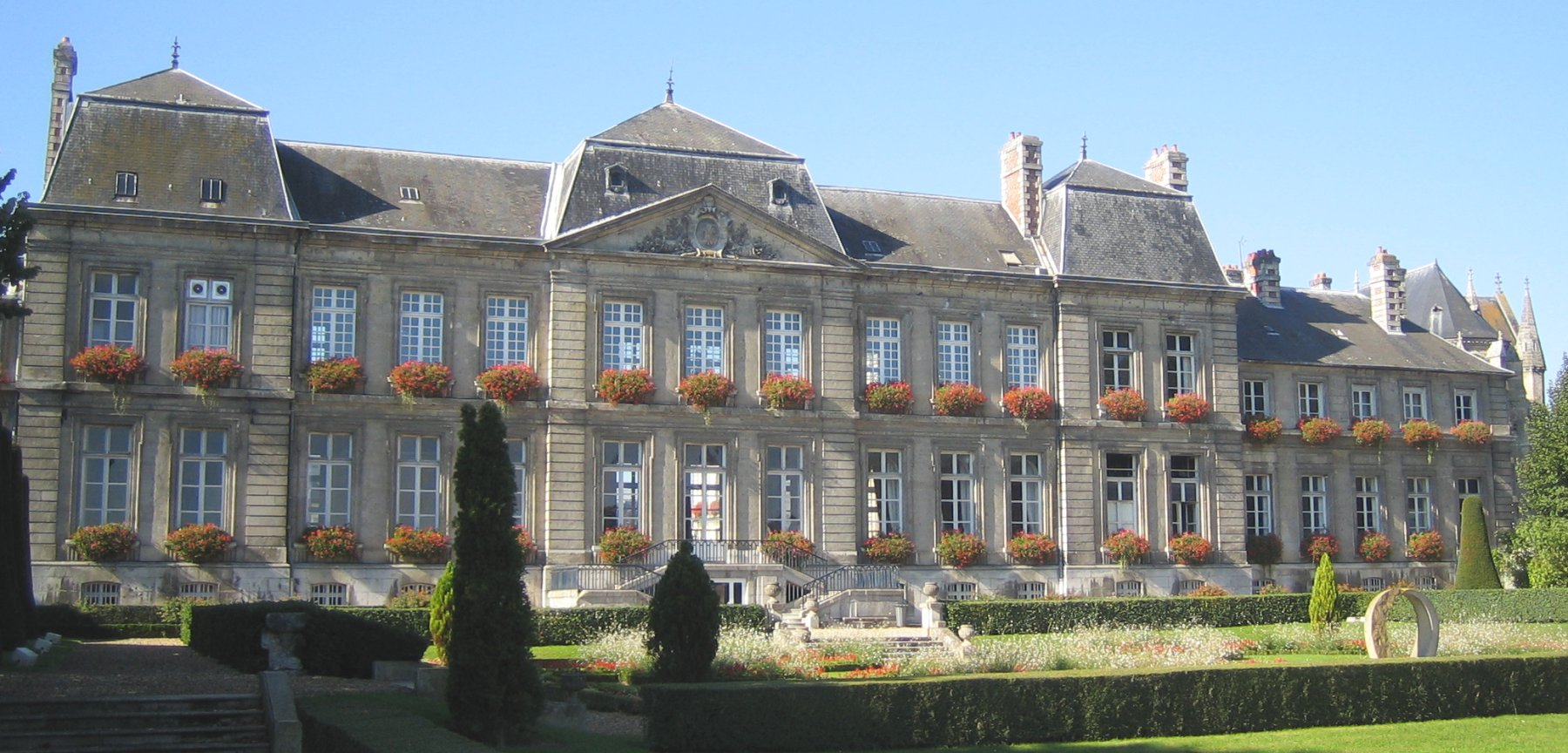
- The Hôtel de Ville

- Coat of arms
- Location of Soissons
- Location within France Location within Hauts-de-France
- Coordinates: 49°22′54″N 3°19′25″E
- Country: France
- Region: Hauts-de-France
- Department: Aisne
- Arrondissement: Soissons
- Canton: Soissons-1 and 2
- Intercommunality: GrandSoissons Agglomération

Government
  - Mayor (2026–32): Alain Crémont
- Area^{1}: 12.32 km^{2} (4.76 sq mi)
- Elevation: 55 m (180 ft)
- Highest elevation: 130 m (430 ft)
- Lowest elevation: 38 m (125 ft)
- Population (2023): 28,046
  - Density: 2,276/km^{2} (5,896/sq mi)
- Time zone: UTC+01:00 (CET)
  - Summer (DST): UTC+02:00 (CEST)
- INSEE/Postal code: 02722 /02200
- ^{1} French Land Register data, which excludes lakes, ponds, glaciers > 1 km^{2} (0.386 sq mi or 247 acres) and river estuaries.

Soissons (French pronunciation: [swasɔ̃]) is a commune in the northern French department of Aisne, in the region of Hauts-de-France. Located on the river Aisne, about 100 kilometres (62 mi) northeast of Paris, it is one of the most ancient towns of France, and is probably the ancient capital of the Suessiones. Soissons is also the see of an ancient Roman Catholic diocese, whose establishment dates from about 300, and it was the location of a number of church synods called "Council of Soissons".

== History ==
Soissons enters written history under its Celtic name, later borrowed into Latin, Noviodunum, meaning "new hillfort", which was the capital of the Suessiones. At Roman contact, it was a town of the Suessiones, mentioned by Julius Caesar (B. G. ii. 12). Caesar (B.C. 57), after leaving the Axona (modern Aisne), entered the territory of the Suessiones, and making one day's long march, reached Noviodunum, which was surrounded by a high wall and a broad ditch. The place surrendered to Caesar.

From 457 to 486, under Aegidius and his son Syagrius, Noviodunum was the capital of the Kingdom of Soissons, until it fell to the Frankish king Clovis I in 486 after the Battle of Soissons.

Part of the Frankish territory of Neustria, the Soissons region, and the Abbey of Saint-Médard, founded in the sixth century, played an important political part during the rule of the Merovingian dynasty (447–751). After the death of Clovis I in 511, Soissons was made the capital of one of the four kingdoms into which his states were divided. Eventually, the kingdom of Soissons disappeared in 613 when the Frankish lands were amalgamated under Chlothar II.

The 744 Council of Soissons met at the instigation of Pepin the Short and Saint Boniface, the Pope's missionary to pagan Germany, secured the condemnation of the Frankish bishop Adalbert and the missionary Clement of Ireland.

During the Hundred Years' War, French forces committed a notorious massacre of English archers stationed at the town's garrison, in which many of the French townsfolk were themselves raped and killed. The massacre of French citizens by French soldiers shocked Europe; Henry V of England, noting that the town of Soissons was dedicated to the saints Crispin and Crispinian, claimed to avenge the honour of the saints when he met the French forces at the Battle of Agincourt on Saint Crispin's Day 1415. The town was liberated by French troops under the command of Joan of Arc on 23 July 1429.

Between June 1728 and July 1729 it hosted the Congress of Soissons an attempt to resolve a long-standing series of disputes between the Kingdom of Great Britain and Spain which had spilled over into the Anglo-Spanish War of 1727–1729. The Congress was largely successful and led to the signing of the Treaty of Seville between them.

In the Franco-Prussian War, the town was sieged by the Prussians for over a month and culminated in French surrender in October 1870.

During World War I, the city came under heavy bombardment. There was mutiny after the disastrous Chemin des Dames offensive at the Second Battle of the Aisne. A statue erected with images of French soldiers killed in action in 1917 is behind the St Peter's Church, next to the Soissons Courthouse.

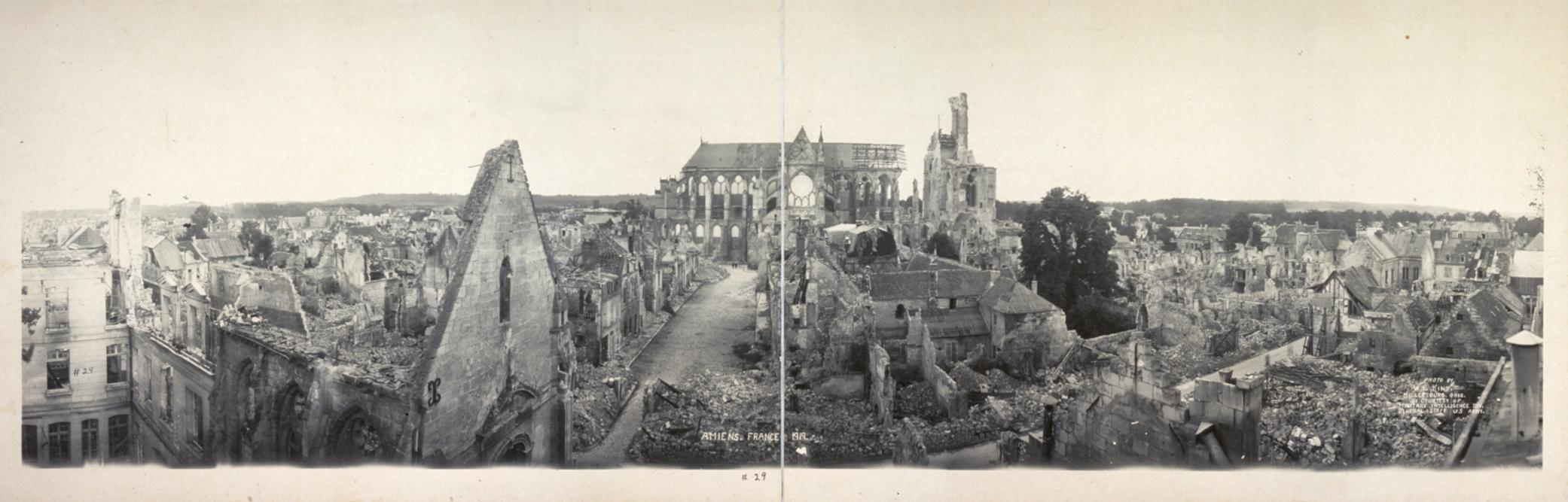
Panorama of Soissons in ruins in 1919

== Sights ==
Today, Soissons is a commercial and manufacturing centre with the 12th-century Soissons Cathedral, the ruins of the Abbey of Saint-Jean-des-Vignes and the crypt of the former Abbey of Saint-Médard as three of its most important historical sites. The nearby Espace Pierres Folles contains a museum, geological trail, and botanical garden.

== Landmarks ==
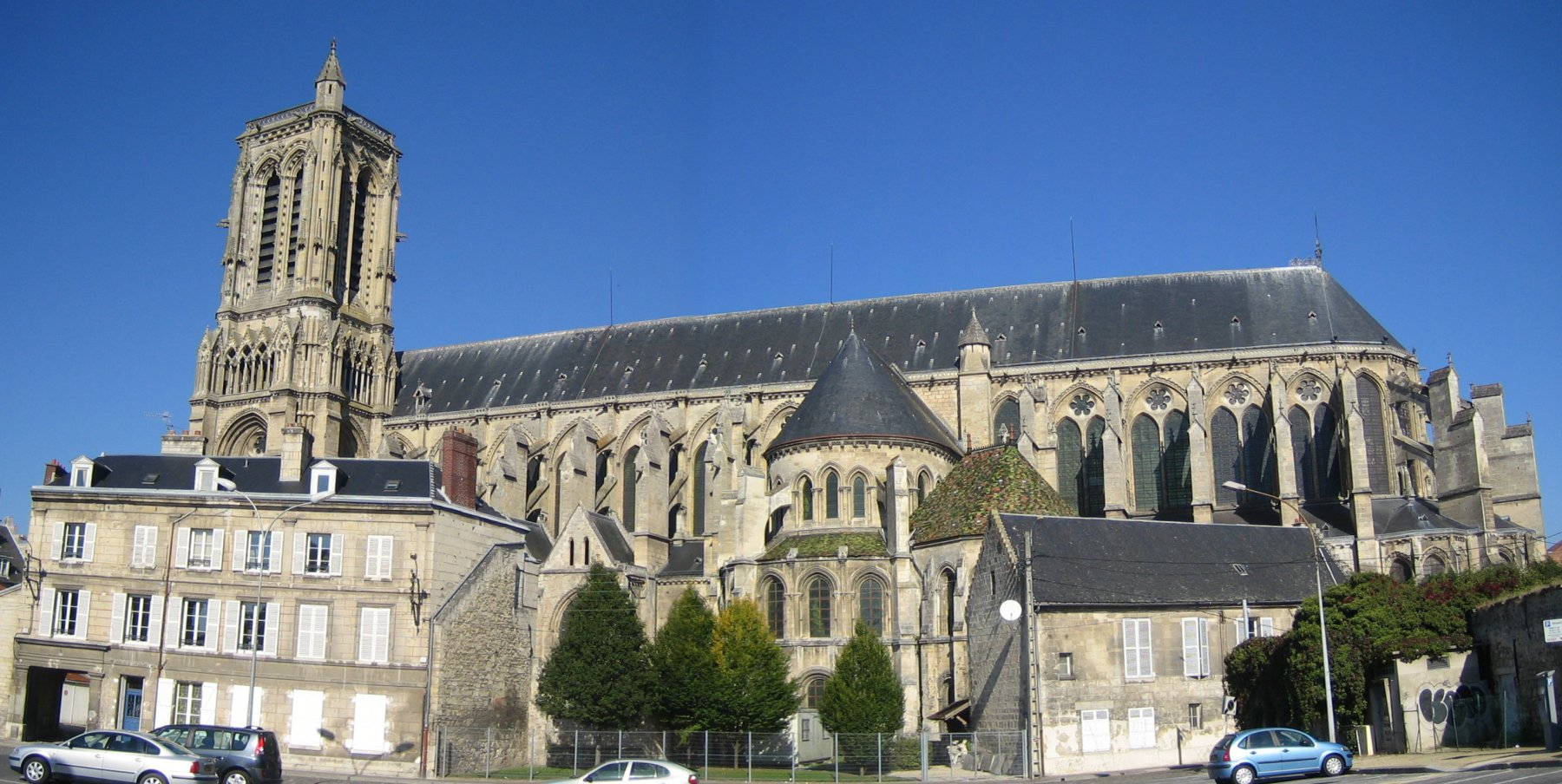
Panoramic view of the Cathedral

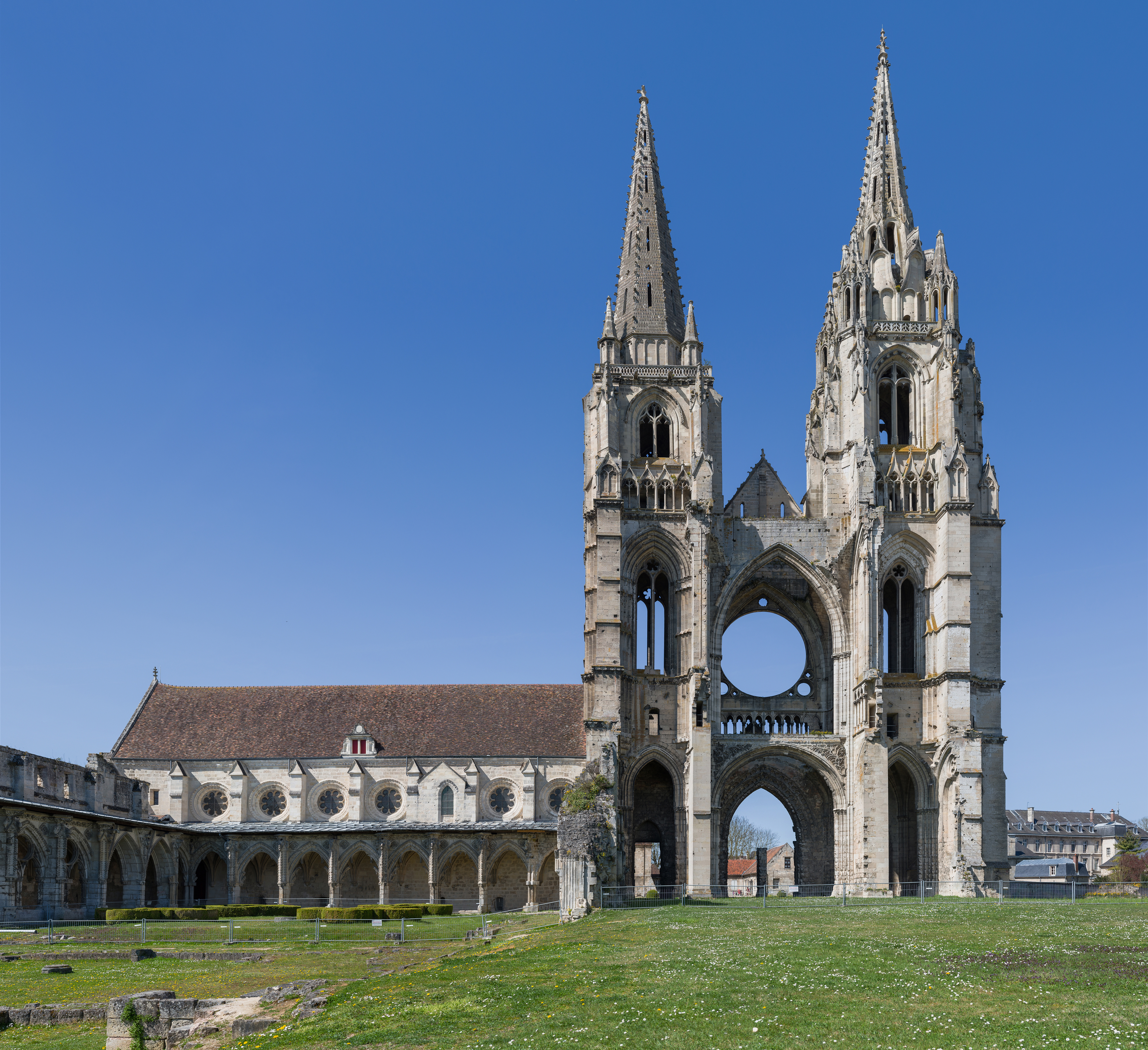
The ruins of the Abbey of Saint-Jean-des-Vignes

- Soissons Cathedral (Cathédrale Saint-Gervais-et-Saint-Protais de Soissons) is constructed in the style of Gothic architecture. The building of the south transept was begun about 1177, and the lowest courses of the choir in 1182. The choir with its original three-storey elevation and extremely tall clerestory was completed in 1211. This was earlier than Chartres Cathedral, on which the design was supposed to have been based. Work then continued into the nave until the late 13th century.
- Abbey of Notre-Dame – The former abbey of Notre Dame, former royal abbey, founded in the Merovingian era, known for its rich treasure of relics, including the "shoe of the Virgin." The abbey had prestigious abbesses, among them Gisèle, sister of Charlemagne, and Catherine de Bourbon, aunt of Henry IV.
- Abbey of Saint-Médard – The Abbey of Saint-Médard was a Benedictine monastery of Soissons whose foundation went back to the sixth century. Today, only the crypt remains.
- The Hôtel de Ville – Since 1833 the Hôtel de Ville has been accommodated in a building designed by architect Jean-François Advyné and built between 1772 and 1775 at the request of the Intendant Pelletier Mortefontaine on the site of a château belonging to the counts of Soissons.
- Arsenal – Exhibition space in the arsenal of the former Abbey of St. Jean des Vignes
- Passerelle des Anglais – The "Passerelle des Anglais" (literally: "Footbridge of the English") is a concrete footbridge over the Aisne in the center of the city. The original bridge was destroyed in 1914. It was rebuilt by British soldiers of 9th Field Company Royal Engineers, after which it was known as the "Pont des Anglais" ("Bridge of the English"). Destroyed again during World War II, it was rebuilt in 1950 as a pedestrian bridge.
- The covered market – Built in 1908 by architect Albert-Désiré Guilbert (1866–1949)

== Personalities ==
- The actress Aurore Clément was born in Soissons in 1945.
- The artist Emmanuel Fillion was born in Soissons in 1966.
- The rabbinic writer Shemaiah of Sossoines (11th century), one of the prime disciples of Rashi.
- The saints Crispin and Crispinian were martyred c. 286 at Soissons for preaching Christianity to the local Gauls.
- The 6th century Burgundian king Guntram was born in Soissons around 532.
- Jeanne Macherez (1852–1930), heroine during World War I; Mayor of Soissons

== Population ==
Historical population

Year	Pop.	±% p.a.
1793	7,675	—
1800	7,229	−0.85%
1806	8,126	+1.97%
1821	7,765	−0.30%
1831	8,149	+0.48%
1836	8,424	+0.67%
1841	9,152	+1.67%
1846	10,143	+2.08%
1851	9,477	−1.35%
1856	7,875	−3.64%
1861	10,208	+5.33%
1866	11,099	+1.69%
1872	10,404	−1.07%
1876	11,089	+1.61%
1881	11,112	+0.04%
1886	11,850	+1.29%
1891	12,074	+0.38%
1896	12,373	+0.49%
1901	13,240	+1.36%

Year	Pop.	±% p.a.
1906	14,334	+1.60%
1911	14,458	+0.17%
1921	14,391	−0.05%
1926	17,865	+4.42%
1931	18,705	+0.92%
1936	20,090	+1.44%
1946	18,174	−1.00%
1954	20,484	+1.51%
1962	23,150	+1.54%
1968	25,890	+1.88%
1975	30,009	+2.13%
1982	30,213	+0.10%
1990	29,829	−0.16%
1999	29,453	−0.14%
2007	28,471	−0.42%
2012	28,309	−0.11%
2017	28,530	+0.16%
2023	28,046	−0.28%

Source: EHESS and INSEE (1968-2023)

== Climate ==
Climate data for Soissons (Braine) (1991–2020 normals, extremes 1988–present)
Month	Jan	Feb	Mar	Apr	May	Jun	Jul	Aug	Sep	Oct	Nov	Dec	Year
Record high °C (°F)	16.3 (61.3)	20.2 (68.4)	25.0 (77.0)	29.1 (84.4)	32.5 (90.5)	36.6 (97.9)	42.1 (107.8)	40.2 (104.4)	35.0 (95.0)	28.9 (84.0)	21.3 (70.3)	17.1 (62.8)	42.1 (107.8)
Mean daily maximum °C (°F)	6.7 (44.1)	8.0 (46.4)	12.2 (54.0)	16.0 (60.8)	19.6 (67.3)	22.8 (73.0)	25.4 (77.7)	25.2 (77.4)	21.2 (70.2)	16.1 (61.0)	10.4 (50.7)	7.2 (45.0)	15.9 (60.6)
Daily mean °C (°F)	4.0 (39.2)	4.6 (40.3)	7.6 (45.7)	10.3 (50.5)	13.9 (57.0)	17.0 (62.6)	19.3 (66.7)	19.0 (66.2)	15.6 (60.1)	11.9 (53.4)	7.4 (45.3)	4.6 (40.3)	11.3 (52.3)
Mean daily minimum °C (°F)	1.4 (34.5)	1.3 (34.3)	2.9 (37.2)	4.6 (40.3)	8.2 (46.8)	11.1 (52.0)	13.1 (55.6)	12.8 (55.0)	10.0 (50.0)	7.7 (45.9)	4.4 (39.9)	2.1 (35.8)	6.6 (43.9)
Record low °C (°F)	−15.7 (3.7)	−15.3 (4.5)	−10.7 (12.7)	−5.0 (23.0)	−1.8 (28.8)	0.5 (32.9)	4.4 (39.9)	3.2 (37.8)	−0.7 (30.7)	−5.3 (22.5)	−12.6 (9.3)	−12.3 (9.9)	−15.7 (3.7)
Average precipitation mm (inches)	58.6 (2.31)	46.5 (1.83)	49.4 (1.94)	42.8 (1.69)	59.6 (2.35)	55.8 (2.20)	61.2 (2.41)	60.5 (2.38)	46.3 (1.82)	56.2 (2.21)	53.7 (2.11)	72.1 (2.84)	662.7 (26.09)
Average precipitation days (≥ 1.0 mm)	12.1	10.4	9.9	9.0	9.6	8.9	9.0	8.8	8.2	10.0	10.7	12.6	119.1
Source: Meteociel

== See also ==
- Battle of Soissons
- Communes of Aisne
- Franks
- List of Frankish kings
- Merovingians
- Suessiones
- Vase of Soissons
- Wolf of Soissons
- Sessions (surname)
