= John I of Soissons =

John I (died after 1115), son of William Busac, Count of Eu and Soissons, and Adelaide, Countess of Soissons. Count of Soissons.

John became Count of Soissons after the death of his brother Renaud II in 1099. John was involved with the Abbey of St. Jean des Vignes.

John married Aveline de Pierrefonds, daughter of Nivelon II, Seigneur de Pierrefonds. John and Aveline had:

- Renaud III, Count of Soissons

Upon the death of John, his son Renaud became the last of the Norman Counts of Soissons.

== Sources ==
- Newman, William Mendel (1971). Les seigneurs de Nesle en Picardie (XIIe-XIIIe siècle): Recueil des Chartes (in French). Edition A. & J. Picard.
- McAlhany, Joseph; Rubenstein, Jay, eds. (2011). Monodies and On the Relics of Saints: The Autobiography and a Manifesto of a French Monk from the Time of the Crusades. Penguin.
- Dormay, Claude; Menestrier (1663). Histoire de la ville de Soissons, ... (2 volumes ed.). chez Nicolas Asseline.
