= John II of Soissons =

John's coat-of-arms

John II (died 1270/72), also known as Je(h)an de Nesle and by the sobriquet le Bon et le Bègue ("the Good and the Stammerer"), was the tenth Count of Soissons, succeeding his father Ralph the Good, in 1235. He was the son of his father's second wife, Yolande. By marriage he also became Count of Chartres and Lord of Amboise. He was well-connected with the trouvères: his younger brother Raoul was one and he received the dedication of a song by Pierrekin de la Coupele. He was also a cousin by marriage of the historian Jean de Joinville. He is not to be confused with John II of Nesle, the burggrave of Bruges.

John's first marriage was to Mary (died c. 1241), the heiress of Roger du Thour et de Chimay and his wife Agnes. John and Mary confirmed donations to the Teutonic Knights in May 1234, where he signed as "John of Soissons, knight, firstborn of the count of Soissons, lord of Thour and Chimay". She left him a son, John III, who would succeed him. John's second wife was Matilda (died 12 May 1256), the daughter and eldest surviving child of Sulpice III of Amboise and Isabella, who had inherited the county of Chartres from her father, Theobald VI, Count of Blois. Matilda was the widow of Richard II, the viscount of Beaumont-sur-Sarthe. On Isabella's death in 1246, Chartres thus passed to Matilda, John, and the house of Nesle. John and his first wife, Mary, had six children:

- John III, Count of Soissons
- Raoul de Nesle (died 1271 in Tunis)
- Adèle de Nesle (died before 1252), married to Jan van Oudenarde, son of Arnoud IV, lord of Oudenaarde, and his wife Alix de Roso
- Yolande de Nesle (died 1242), married to Hugues II, lord of Rumigny
- Eléonore de Nesle (died after 1280), married to Renaud, viscount of Thouars
- Isabelle de Nesle, married to Nicolas II, lord of Barbançon

By his geographical proximity to Paris, John was a close member of the royal circle. In 1230 he supported Blanche of Castile as regent for the young Louis IX, in opposition to Peter I, Duke of Brittany. In 1231 he began a controversy over property with the clerical leadership of Soissons. After imprisoning several ecclesiastics, Louis IX and the Archbishop of Reims, Henry of Dreux, intervened to obtain an agreement between the feuding parties. In 1242 John supported Louis against the rebellious Hugh X of Lusignan and the invading Henry III of England in a conflict that became known as the "Saintonge War". John also joined the Seventh Crusade in 1248. On the day of the Battle of Mansurah (8 February 1250) he commented to Jean de Joinville that "we'll speak about this day again, you and me, in the ladies' chamber". He was captured by the Mamelukes in April 1250, but was soon freed, after which he returned home.

In 1265 John joined the army of Charles of Anjou that was heading to Italy to conquer the Kingdom of Sicily. He was in charge of the escort of Charles' wife, Beatrice of Provence, until they arrived at Rome. In 1266 he fought in the Battle of Benevento on the winning side. In 1270 John joined the Eighth Crusade in Tunisia and died shortly after his return.

== Sources ==
- Griffiths, Quentin (1993). "The Nesles of Picardy in the Service of the Last Capetians". Francia. 20 (1): 69–78.
