= John V of Soissons =

John V (21 March 1281 – 1304), was the reigning Count of Soissons.

== Biography ==
He was the son of John IV, Count of Soissons, and his wife, Marguerite of Rumigny. John inherited the countship of Soissons from his father in 1302. Nothing is known about his brief rule of the county. He never married and died with no heirs. Upon his death, his brother Hugh became Count of Soissons.

== Sources ==
- Dormay, C., Histoire de la ville de Soissons et de ses rois, ducs, comtes et gouverneurs, Soissons, 1664 (available on Google Books)
