= Raynald I of Soissons =

Medieval French aristocrat

Renaud I, Count of Soissons (c. 985–1057) was Grand Master of the Hotel de France. He died at a siege of the tower of Soissons. His title passed to his daughter Adelaide.

== Biography ==
Renaud I was the son of Guy I, Count of Soissons, and his wife Adelaide. The Acta Sanctorum commentary of the life of Saint Simon de Valois (based on a manuscript of the abbey of Saint-Claude) identifies both Renaud and his father. Renaud was Grand Master of the Hotel de France.

Renaud died in the siege of the tower of Soissons, presumably the Soissons Cathedral, in 1057. It is unclear as to the circumstances of this siege. It is not clear when Renaud's son Guy became Count of Soissons, but it was apparently some time before 1057 when they both died in the siege of Soissons. Upon their death, Renaud's daughter Adelaide became the Countess of Soissons.

== Family ==
Renaud married Lessaline de Dammartin, the widow of Hilduin III, Count of Montdidier. They had two children:

- Guy II, Count of Soissons
- Adelaide, Countess of Soissons

Because of his marriage, Renaud was related to the House of Montdidier, the Counts of Brienne, the Counts of Perche, the Kings of Aragon, and the Counts of Chiny.
