= Counts of Soissons =

This is a list of those who bore the title Count of Soissons (French: Comte de Soissons) and ruled Soissons and its civitas or diocese as a county in the Middle Ages. The title continued in use into modern times, but without ties to the actual Soissonnais.

== Carolingians ==
- 896 – c. 907 Herbert I, Count of Vermandois
- c. 907–930 Herbert II, Count of Vermandois, son of the previous
- 969–988 Guy I, son of the previous

== Angevins ==
- 988–1047 Adelise, daughter of the previous

== Bar-sur-Aube ==
- until 1019 Nocher I, jure uxoris, husband of the previous
- 1019–1042 Renaud I, son of the previous
- 1042–1057 Guy II, son of the previous
- 1057–1079 Adelaide, sister of the previous

== Normans ==
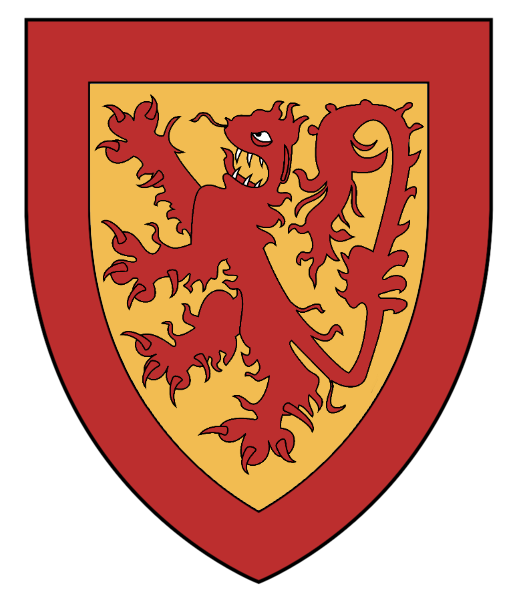
Arms of Renaud II

- 1076 William Busac, also Count of Eu, jure uxoris, husband of the previous
- 1076–1099 Renaud II, son of the previous
- 1099–1115 John I, brother of the previous
- 1115–1141 Renaud III, son of the previous

== House of Nesle ==
- 1141–1178 Yves the Old, great-grandson of William Busac
- 1178–1180 Conon, nephew of the previous
- 1180–1235 Ralph the Good, brother of the previous
- 1235–1270 John II (the Stammerer), son of the previous
- 1270–1284 John III, son of the previous
- 1284–1289 John IV, son of the previous
- 1289–1298 John V, son of the previous
- 1298–1306 Hugh, brother of the previous
- 1306–1344 Margaret, daughter of the previous

== Avesnes ==
- 1317–1344 John of Beaumont, jure uxoris, husband of the previous
- 1344–1350 Joan, daughter of the previous

== Châtillon ==
- 1344–1346 Louis II of Blois, jure uxoris, husband of the previous
- 1346–1350 Louis III of Blois, son of the previous
- 1350–1367 Guy II of Blois, brother of the previous

After the Battle of Poitiers, Louis III sold the County of Soissons to Engeurrand VII in order to ransom his brother Guy.

== Coucy ==
- 1367–1397 Enguerrand VII, Lord of Coucy
- 1397–1405 Marie de Coucy

== Dukes of Orléans ==
- 1404–1407 Louis
- 1407–1412 Charles (died 1465)

== Dukes of Bar ==
- 1412–1415 Robert de Marle, son of Henry of Bar and Marie de Coucy
- 1415–1462 Jeanne de Marle

== Dukes of Luxembourg ==
- 1462–1476 John VI
- 1476–1482 Peter II of Saint-Pol
- 1482–1547 Mary II (died 1547)

== Princes of Condé ==
- 1487–1495 François, jure uxoris
- 1495–1537 Charles, Duke of Vendôme, jure matris
- 1547–1557 Jean VII
- 1557–1569 Louis de Bourbon, Prince of Condé, brother of prec.
- 1569–1612 Charles de Bourbon
- 1612–1641 Louis de Bourbon
- 1641–1656 Marie de Bourbon, Princess of Carignano (died 1692), sister of prec.

== Princes of Carignano ==
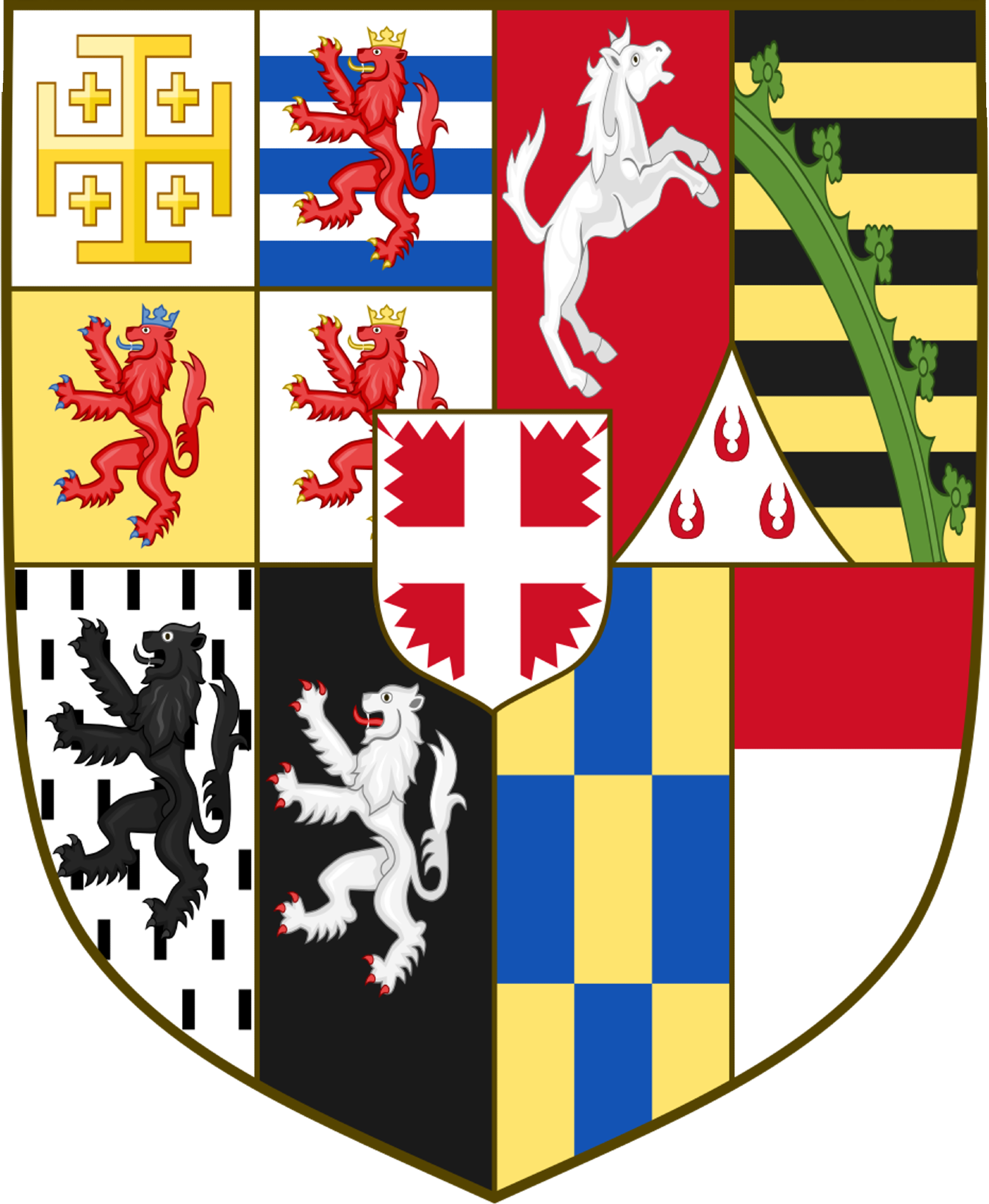
Coat of arms of the Princes of Carignano

- 1641–1656 Thomas Francis (1596–1656), jure uxoris
- 1646/50–1656 Joseph Emmanuel, titular count, son of prec.
- 1656–1673 Eugène Maurice, brother of prec.
- 1673–1702 Louis Thomas, son of prec.
- 1702–1729 Emmanuel Thomas, son of prec.
- 1729–1734 Eugène Jean François, son of prec.
