= 2022 French legislative election in Aisne =

The 2022 French legislative election occurred on 12 June 2022 and 19 June 2022. In the Aisne department, five deputies were elected with the department's five constituencies.

== Results ==
=== Elected deputies ===
Constituency	Outgoing deputy	Party	Legislative group	Elected or re-elected deputy	Party	Legislative group
1st	Aude Bono-Vandorme	LREM	LREM	Nicolas Dragon	RN	RN
2nd	Julien Dive	LR	LR	Julien Dive	LR	LR
3rd	Jean-Louis Bricout	ex-PS	SOC	Jean-Louis Bricout	DVG	NI
4th	Marc Delatte	LREM	LREM	José Beaurain	RN	RN
5th	Jacques Krabal*	LREM	LREM	Jocelyn Dessigny	RN	RN
* Outgoing deputy not-standing for re-election in 2022.

=== Results by constituency ===
==== First constituency ====
- Outgoing deputy: Aude Bono-Vandorme (LREM).
- Elected deputy: Nicolas Dragon (RN).

Results in the 1st constituency
Candidate	Party & coalition	Nuance	1st round		2nd round	
Candidate	Party & coalition	Nuance	Votes	%	Votes	%
Nicolas Dragon	RN	RN	11,245	33.14	17,049	54.53
Aude Bono-Vandorme	LREM (ENS)	ENS	7,939	23.40	14,217	45.47
Olivier Fenioux	LFI (NUPES)	NUP	6,463	19.05		
Paul Mougenot	LR (UDC)	LR	3,853	11.35		
Carole Ribeiro	LR diss.	DVD	2,052	6.05		
Benjamin Cauchy	REC	REC	1,312	3.87		
Michel Degouy	DLF (UPF)	DSV	570	1.68		
Jean-Loup Pernelle	LO	DXG	500	1.47		
Valid votes			33,934	97.77	31,266	92.68
White votes			546	1.57	1,869	5.54
Rejected votes			227	0.66	602	1.78
Total			34,707	100	33,737	100
Abstentions			37,772	52.11	38,746	53.46
Registered voters - voter turnout			72,479	47.89	72,483	46.54

==== Second constituency ====
- Outgoing deputy: Julien Dive (LR).
- Elected deputy: Julien Dive (LR).

Results in the 2nd constituency
Candidate	Party & coalition	Nuance	1st round		2nd round	
Candidate	Party & coalition	Nuance	Votes	%	Votes	%
Julien Dive	LR (UDC)	LR	11,704	35.91	17,463	58.17
Lola Puissant	LAF - RN	RN	9,331	28.63	12,558	41.83
Sulyvan Ransquin	LFI (NUPES)	NUP	5.757	17.66		
Fatima El Ouasdi	HOR (ENS)	ENS	3,755	11.52		
Cécé Amewoui	REC	REC	938	2.88		
Corinne Bécourt	PCF diss.	DVG	505	1.55		
Anne Zanditénas	LO	DXG	315	0.97		
Éric Lepeuple	SE	DIV	288	0.88		
Valid votes			32,593	98.02	30,021	94.28
White votes			473	1.42	1,332	4.18
Rejected votes			187	0.56	489	1.54
Total			33,253	100	31,842	100
Abstentions			39,923	54.56	41,347	56.49
Registered voters - voter turnout			73,176	45.44	73,189	43.51

==== Third constituency ====
- Outgoing deputy: Jean-Louis Bricout (ex-PS).
- Elected deputy: Jean-Louis Bricout (DVG).

Results in the 3rd constituency
Candidate	Party & coalition	Nuance	1st round		2nd round	
Candidate	Party & coalition	Nuance	Votes	%	Votes	%
Jean-Louis Bricout	SE (NUPES)	NUP	13,518	45.88	15,612	54.93
Paul-Henry Hansen-Catta	RN	RN	9,518	32.31	12,809	45.07
Jérôme Moineuse	LR (UDC)	LR	3,584	12.17		
Hervé Bernardeau	CNIP (REC)	REC	1,617	5.49		
Laetitia Voisin	LO	DXG	762	2.59		
Agnès Chotin	LP (UPF)	DSV	462	1.57		
Valid votes			29,461	97.12	28,421	94.66
White votes			626	2.06	1,137	3.79
Rejected votes			248	0.82	467	1.56
Total			30,335	100	30,025	100
Abstentions			36,374	54.53	36,693	55.00
Registered voters - voter turnout			66,709	45.47	66,718	45.00

==== Fourth constituency ====
- Outgoing deputy: Marc Delatte (LREM).
- Elected deputy: José Beaurain (RN).

Results in the 4th constituency
Candidate	Party & coalition	Nuance	1st round		2nd round	
Candidate	Party & coalition	Nuance	Votes	%	Votes	%
José Beaurain	RN	RN	11,973	35.72	17,587	57.15
Marc Delatte	LREM (ENS)	ENS	7,632	22.77	13,187	42.85
Aurélien Gall	PCF (NUPES)	NUP	7,461	22.26		
David Bobin	LR (UDC)	LR	4,300	12.83		
Vanessa Vicente	REC	REC	810	2.42		
Damien Créon	DLF (UPF)	DSV	689	2.06		
Flora Bouillaguet	LO	DXG	652	1.95		
Valid votes			33,517	97.81	30,774	92.33
White votes			548	1.60	1,886	5.66
Rejected votes			201	0.59	669	2.01
Total			34,266	100	33,329	100
Abstentions			44,526	56.51	45,449	57.69
Registered voters - voter turnout			78,792	43.49	78,778	42.31

==== Fifth constituency ====
- Outgoing deputy: Jacques Krabal (LREM).
- Elected deputy: Jocelyn Dessigny (RN).

Results in the 5th constituency
Candidate	Party & coalition	Nuance	1st round		2nd round	
Candidate	Party & coalition	Nuance	Votes	%	Votes	%
Jocelyn Dessigny	RN	RN	13,572	35.22	20,589	62.41
Stéphane Frère	LFI (NUPES)	NUP	7,265	18.85	12,403	37.59
Jeanne Roussel	LREM (ENS)	ENS	6,214	16.12		
Sébastien Eugène	PRV diss.	DVC	6,093	15.81		
Jade Gilquin	LR (UDC)	LR	1,873	4.86		
Florence Triboulet	REC	REC	1,400	3.63		
Françoise Vacca	PA	ECO	892	2.31		
Joffrey Bollée	LP (UPF)	DSV	714	1.85		
Francis Garcia	LO	DXG	515	1.34		
Valid votes			38,538	98.02	32,992	86.55
White votes			588	1.50	4,076	10.69
Rejected votes			191	0.49	1,050	2.75
Total			39,317	100	38,118	100
Abstentions			43,824	52.71	45,021	54.15
Registered voters - voter turnout			83,141	47.29	83,139	45.85
