= 2024 French legislative election in Aisne =

Following the first round of the 2024 French legislative election on 30 June 2024, runoff elections in each constituency where no candidate received a vote share greater than 50 percent were scheduled for 7 July. Candidates permitted to stand in the runoff elections needed to either come in first or second place in the first round or achieve more than 12.5 percent of the votes of the entire electorate (as opposed to 12.5 percent of the vote share due to low turnout).

== Aisne ==
=== 1st constituency ===
Candidate	Party or alliance		Votes	%
Nicolas Dragon	National Rally		24,774	54.49
Damien Delavenne	Ensemble	Renaissance	10,380	22.83
Charles Culoli	New Popular Front	Socialist Party	8,654	19.03
Jean-Loup Pernelle	Far-left	Lutte Ouvrière	701	1.54
Philippe Tréguier	Reconquête		644	1.42
Matthieu Léon Boufflet	Independent		316	0.69
Total			45,469	100.00
Valid votes			45,469	96.56
Invalid votes			429	0.91
Blank votes			1,189	2.53
Total votes			47,087	100.00
Registered voters/turnout			72,055	65.35

=== 2nd constituency ===
Candidate	Party or alliance		First round		Second round	
Candidate	Party or alliance		Votes	%	Votes	%
Philippe Torre	National Rally		21,496	47.06	22,409	49.42
Julien Dive	The Republicans		16,288	35.66	22,933	50.58
Anne-Sophie Dujancourt	New Popular Front	La France Insoumise	6,511	14.26		
Didier Kaczmarek	Reconquête		561	1.23		
Corrine Bécourt	Far-left	Communist Party (Note: Dissident who ran without the support of New Popular Front.)	497	1.09		
Anne Zanditénas	Far-left	Lutte Ouvrière	322	0.70		
Total			45,675	100.00	45,342	100.00
Valid votes			45,675	97.82	45,342	97.26
Invalid votes			303	0.65	390	0.84
Blank votes			716	1.53	888	1.90
Total votes			46,694	100.00	46,620	100.00
Registered voters/turnout			73,165	63.82	73,181	63.71

=== 3rd constituency ===
Candidate	Party or alliance		Votes	%
Eddy Casterman	Union of the far right	Independent	23,577	57.64
Jean-Louis Bricout	Miscellaneous left	Socialist Party	15,385	37.62
Damien Créon	Sovereigntist right	Debout la France	1,165	2.85
Laetitia Voisin	Far-left	Lutte Ouvrière	763	1.87
Anne-Marie Fournier	Reconquête		11	0.03
Total			40,901	100.00
Valid votes			40,901	96.60
Invalid votes			487	1.15
Blank votes			952	2.25
Total votes			42,340	100.00
Registered voters/turnout			65,988	64.16

=== 4th constituency ===
Candidate	Party or alliance		Votes	%
José Beaurain	National Rally		25,913	55.04
Benjamin Maurice	Ensemble	Renaissance	10,448	22.19
Lola Prié	New Popular Front	Socialist Party	9,335	19.83
Flora Bouillaguet	Far-left	Lutte Ouvrière	832	1.77
Philippe Goujard	Far-right		553	1.17
Total			47,081	100.00
Valid votes			47,081	97.13
Invalid votes			400	0.83
Blank votes			992	2.05
Total votes			48,473	100.00
Registered voters/turnout			78,936	61.41

=== 5th constituency ===
Candidate	Party or alliance		Votes	%
Jocelyn Dessigny	National Rally		27,670	53.00
Jeanne Roussel	Ensemble	Renaissance	10,881	20.84
Karim Belaïd	New Popular Front	Socialist Party	10,272	19.67
Jade Gilquin	The Republicans		2,665	5.10
Yona Merbouche	Far-left	Lutte Ouvrière	721	1.38
Total			52,209	100.00
Valid votes			52,209	96.72
Invalid votes			743	1.38
Blank votes			1,029	1.91
Total votes			53,981	100.00
Registered voters/turnout			82,551	65.39
