= Aisne deputies to the eighth legislature of the French Fifth Republic =

Unlike the other legislatures of the Fifth French Republic, the eighth legislature from 1986 to 1988 had proportional representation by department.

This table summarises representatives from Aisne in the 7th, 8th and 9th legislatures.

Constituency	7th legislature	8th legislature	9th legislature
1st	Robert Aumont, PS	Jean-Claude Lamant, RPR Daniel Le Meur, PCF Jean-Pierre Balligand, PS Bernard Lefranc, PS André Rossi, UDF-RAD	René Dosière, PS
2nd	Daniel Le Meur, PCF	Jean-Claude Lamant, RPR Daniel Le Meur, PCF Jean-Pierre Balligand, PS Bernard Lefranc, PS André Rossi, UDF-RAD	Daniel Le Meur, PCF
3rd	Jean-Pierre Balligand, PS	Jean-Claude Lamant, RPR Daniel Le Meur, PCF Jean-Pierre Balligand, PS Bernard Lefranc, PS André Rossi, UDF-RAD	Jean-Pierre Balligand, PS
4th	Roland Renard, PCF	Jean-Claude Lamant, RPR Daniel Le Meur, PCF Jean-Pierre Balligand, PS Bernard Lefranc, PS André Rossi, UDF-RAD	Bernard Lefranc, PS
5th	Bernard Lefranc, PS	Jean-Claude Lamant, RPR Daniel Le Meur, PCF Jean-Pierre Balligand, PS Bernard Lefranc, PS André Rossi, UDF-RAD	André Rossi, UDF-RAD
