= Marie-Françoise Bechtel =

French politician

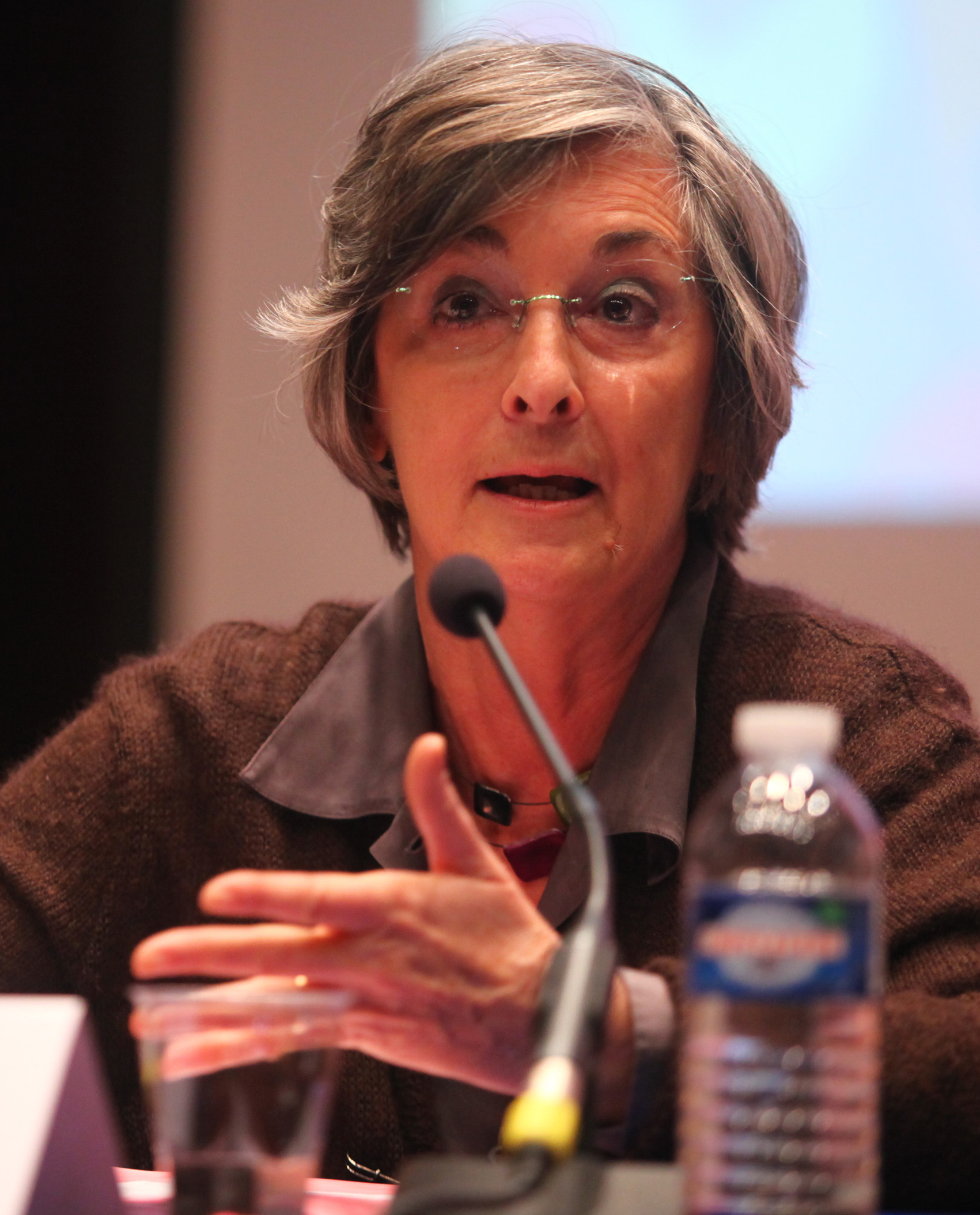
- Marie-Françoise Bechtel in 2010

Deputy for Aisne's 4th constituency in the National Assembly of France
- In office 20 June 2012 – 20 June 2017
- Preceded by: Jacques Desallangre
- Succeeded by: Marc Delatte

Personal details
- Born: 19 March 1946 (age 80) Coarraze

Marie-Françoise Bechtel (born 19 March 1946 in Coarraze) is a senior French civil servant and politician. Appointed Councillor of State in 1980, she directed the National School of Administration from 2000 to 2002. She was deputy for Aisne's 4th constituency in the National Assembly of France from 2012 to 2017.

== Biography ==
Daughter of Gaston Cassiau (1911-1988), a civil servant in public works, and Marie-Christine Sahorès (1907-1999). A teacher and school principal, Bechtel is from Oloron-Sainte-Marie, where she passed her baccalaureate in 1963.

She reads Jean-Paul Sartre, whom she "adores". After studying philosophy at the University of Paris-Sorbonne - where she became involved in May 68, she obtained l Agrégation in 1972 and, "follower of the Hegelian dialectic", taught this discipline at the high schools of Sainte-Foy-la-Grande, Libourne and Chartres for five years.

In 1978, she entered the École nationale d'administration (ENA) as part of the "Voltaire promotion" (1978–1980) via the internal entrance exam. Michel Sapin noted her as an "experienced woman" during her time there. She graduated ranked 4th in her class.

Upon graduating from ENA in 1980, she joined the Council of State, fulfilling her career ambitions. She spent the majority of her professional life there, punctuated by various roles in ministerial cabinets.

In 1984, she met Jean-Pierre Chevènement, then Minister of National Education. Sharing his vision of "Republican elitism," she served in his cabinet for two years, where she was specifically in charge of issues regarding private education.

In 1993, she served as a project manager and later as the chief of staff (directrice de cabinet) for the Minister of Justice, Michel Vauzelle.

She joined the Citizen's Movement, Chevènement's political party, in 1997. She returned to his cabinet in 1999 when he was appointed Minister of the Interior.

In September 2000, she became the first woman appointed to head the ENA. At the time, while some colleagues and opponents found her overly authoritarian, Michel Sapin praised her "rich and assertive vision of public service." She left the position at the end of 2002.

Retrospectively, she has argued that the high civil service was more diverse in the late 1970s than it is today, stating, "it has become extremely uniform, whether in thought or behavior."

During the 1997 legislative elections, she stood as a candidate in Paris. In the 2001 municipal elections, she led the party list in the 13th arrondissement of Paris.

She served as the campaign manager for Jean-Pierre Chevènement during the 2012 French presidential election, until he withdrew his candidacy in January 2012. In March 2012, following Chevènement's endorsement of François Hollande, she joined the political council of the "Hollande 2012" campaign.

She is a member of the scientific council of the Fondation Res Publica. In June 2021, she succeeded Jean-Pierre Chevènement as its president, after previously serving as vice-president.
