= Admiral Horn =

Admiral Horn may refer to:

- Gregory C. Horn (born 1953), U.S. Navy rear admiral
- Henrik Horn (1618–1693), Swedish admiral
- Klas Horn (1517–1566), Finnish-born Swedish admiral
- Pantelis Horn (1881–1941), Hellenic Coast Guard rear admiral

== See also ==
- Frederick J. Horne (1880–1959), U.S. Navy admiral
