= Jean Messiha =

French media personality, former politician and civil servant (born 1970)

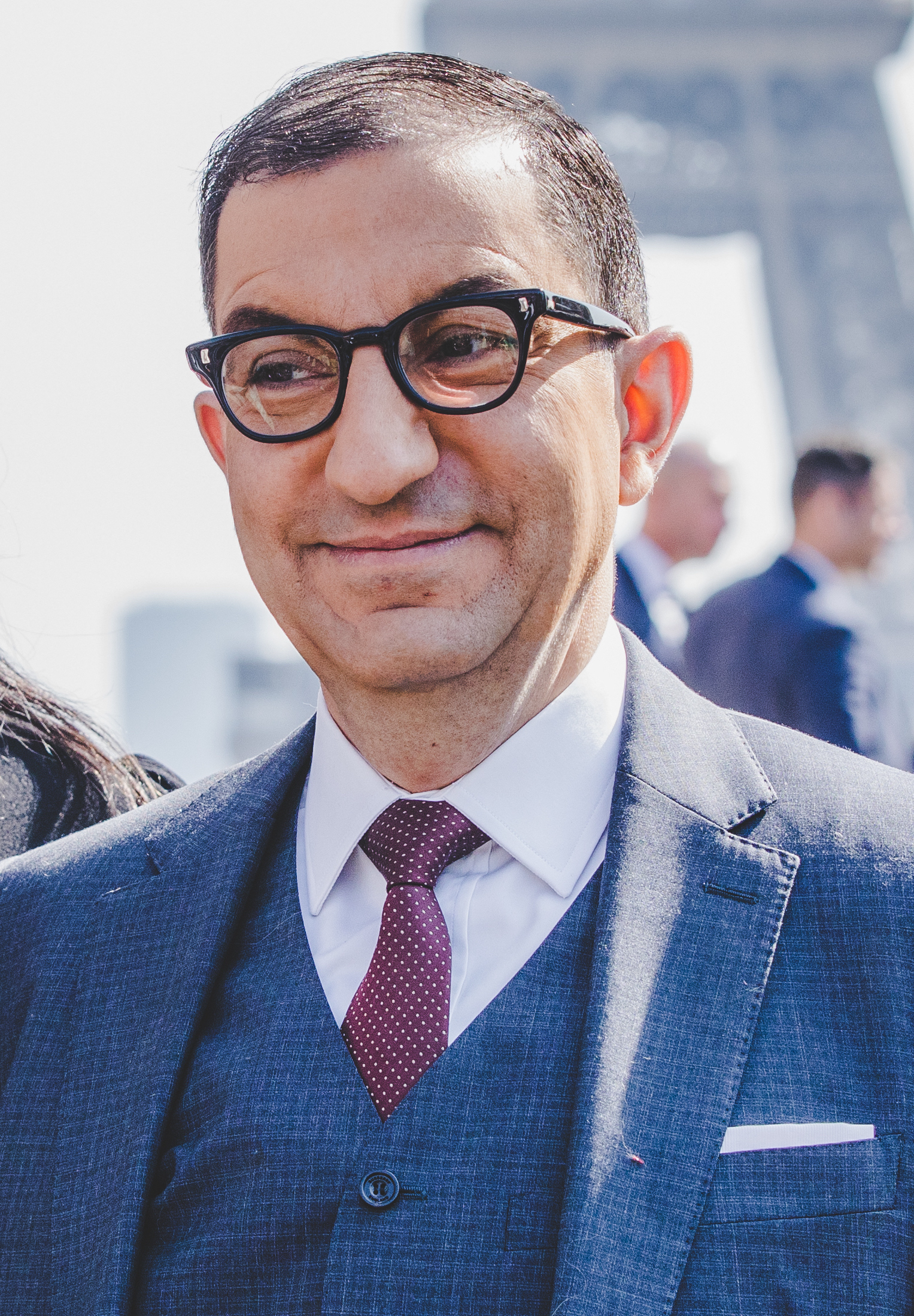
- Messiha in 2022
- Born: Hossam Boutros Messiha; 10 September 1970 (age 56); Cairo, Egypt
- Education: Sciences Po; École nationale d'administration
- Occupations: Economist, civil servant, political advisor, commentator
- Political party: Reconquête (2022; 2024–present)
- Other political affiliations: National Rally (2016–2020); Independent (2020–2022)
- Movement: Far-right on Internet and social networks

Jean Messiha (French pronunciation: [ʒɑ̃ mesja]; born Hossam Boutros Messiha, Arabic: حسام بطرس مسيحة, 10 September 1970) is an Egyptian-born French far-right economist, media personality, and formerly a politician and senior civil servant. He was appointed Deputy Undersecretary of Management at the Ministry of Defence in 2014 before he joined the National Front (FN) in 2016, when he became spokesman of Horaces, a group of high-ranking civil servants and business executives who meet once a month to discuss the party platform.

Messiha stood as a candidate in the 2017 legislative election in the 4th constituency of the Aisne department. In 2020, he left the party to assume the presidency of the Apollon Institute, a far-right think tank. In 2022, Messiha joined presidential candidate Éric Zemmour's newly-founded Reconquête party and became its spokesman.

== Early life ==
Messiha was born Hossam Boutros Messiha in 1970 in Cairo, Egypt, to a family of Coptic Orthodox Christians; his father was a diplomat. He lived in Bogotá, Colombia from the age of 3 to 7. At the age of 8, he arrived with his family in France, reportedly "not speaking a word of French". He then grew up in Mulhouse. In 1990, upon his naturalisation as a French citizen, he changed his first name to Jean.

Messiha graduated from Sciences Po, where one of his professors was Henri Guaino. He earned a PhD in Economics. His thesis was about the budgetary policies of the Maastricht Treaty and Amsterdam Treaty. He graduated from the École nationale d'administration in 2005.

== Career ==
Messiha began his career as a high-ranking civil servant in 2005. He was appointed as Deputy Undersecretary of Management at the Ministry of Defence in 2014.

Messiha became an advisor to National Rally leader Marine Le Pen in 2014. In May 2016, he became the spokesman of the "Horaces", a group of high-ranking civil servants and business executives, supporting Marine Le Pen, who meet once a month and discuss the political platform of the National Rally. While the group announces more than 155 members, Messiha is the only one whose name has been publicly known so far. According to Dominique Albertini of Libération, Messiha's role within the National Rally is to represent "the drawing power of [the party] towards high-ranking civil servants".

Messiha has asserted his belief in Renaud Camus's Great Replacement conspiracy theory, whereby Christian populations are being "replaced" through non-European immigration, specifically from Muslim and African countries. On social media, he has expressed that Islam is at odds with France's republican system. He is also a critic of the European Union.

A candidate in the 2017 French legislative election to represent Aisne's 4th constituency in the National Assembly, Messiha was defeated in the second round by La République En Marche! candidate Marc Delatte, with 43.73% of valid votes against Delatte's 56.27%.

In November 2020, several news outlets reported that Messiha was going to leave the National Rally. This was later confirmed by Messiha, who announced his departure in an interview published in Valeurs actuelles. In March 2021, Jean Messiha made the headlines in affirming the existence of a "black privilege" during the 46th César Awards.

During the 2022 French presidential election, Messiha supported the candidacy of Éric Zemmour.

According to the news website Mediapart, he continued to receive salaries from the Defence Ministry from 2017 to 2022.

On 8 November 2023 the Regulatory Authority for Audiovisual and Digital Communication (Arcom) announced its intention to classify Messiha under the "Miscellaneous right" etiquette. Speaking time on television is therefore deducted from the etiquette's allocated time.

In the 2024 European Parliament election in France, Messiha was eighth on the Reconquête list led by Marion Maréchal.

== Media presence and activism ==
Since the late 2010s, Messiha's fame has grown in France, mainly due to his interventions in the TV shows of C8 and CNews and his activities on social networks.

In 2020, the French website Arrêt sur images indicates Messiha is "the favourite RN's member of Canal+ group". Moreover, his debate with Yassine Belattar has exceed 700 000 views on Youtube.

Speaking enormously and very often on the social networks, his number of subscribers on Twitter increased from 40 000 in 2019 to 110 000 in 2020. In August 2021, his Twitter account was suspended because of his words judged hateful. However, it has been reactivated in January 2023 following the acquisition of Twitter by Elon Musk.

In July 2023, he organised on the GoFundMe website a fundraiser in favour of the family of the policeman charged with killing 17-year-old Nahel Merzouk. It raised more than a million euros in a few days.

== Legal proceedings ==
In May 2026, he was accused of having collected the €42,000 raised through a crowdfunding campaign launched at his initiative and intended for the widows of the two prison officers killed on 14 May 2024 by the armed commando that attacked a prison van during the escape of Mohamed Amra. As the money had not been paid to the victims, one of them filed a complaint for breach of trust. Jean Messiha stated that the platform had made an error by transferring the funds to his personal account and said that the entire amount mistakenly credited to his account would be transferred to the bank account of the victims' families.

On 28 May, Matthieu Chirez, a lawyer representing one of the victims, stated on the television channel BFM TV that he had contacted Jean Messiha several times over a period of several months regarding the funds raised through the crowdfunding campaign. According to Chirez, Messiha wrote to him on 20 April 2026 stating that he had never received the funds in his personal account, that the funds were no longer held by the crowdfunding campaign, and that they had most likely been reclaimed by the donors, explaining that this would occur when funds remained unclaimed. However, GoFundMe, the platform hosting the crowdfunding campaign, stated that the funds had been transferred to Jean Messiha's account on 15 May 2024. Matthieu Chirez also stated that Pauline Ragot, the lawyer representing the other victim, was joining his complaint.

== Personal life ==
Messiha became a naturalised French citizen at the age of 20, changing his first name to "Jean" in the process. He has described himself as a "naturalized ethnic Frenchman" (French: Français de souche par naturalisation) and "Arab outside, French inside". In February 2017, he was surprised to learn that, in spite of his naturalisation, he was still considered an immigrant by the national statistics bureau of France, Institut national de la statistique et des études économiques (INSEE).
