= Isabelle Vasseur =

French politician

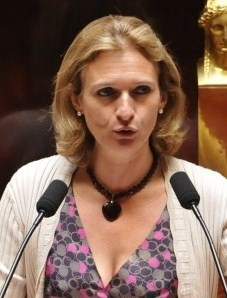
- Isabelle Vasseur in the National Assembly, 2008

Deputy for Aisne's 5th constituency in the French National Assembly
- In office 2007–2012
- Preceded by: Daniel Gard
- Succeeded by: Jacques Krabal

Personal details
- Born: 10 April 1959 (age 65); Nancy

Isabelle Vasseur (born 10 April 1959) is a former member of the National Assembly of France. She represented Aisne's 5th constituency from 2007 to 2012, as a member of the Union for a Popular Movement (UMP).

She was elected on 17 June 2007 to the thirteenth legislature (2007–2012) in the 5th district of l'Aisne by beating, in the second round, Dominique Jordain with 53.96% of the votes. She succeeded Daniel Gard the previous deputy (UMP), who was the substitute candidate for Renaud Dutreil in the 2002 election.

She was vice president of the UMP in the National Assembly.
