= Aisne's 5th constituency =

Constituency of the National Assembly of France

5th constituency of the Aisne
- inline Constituency of the National Assembly of France

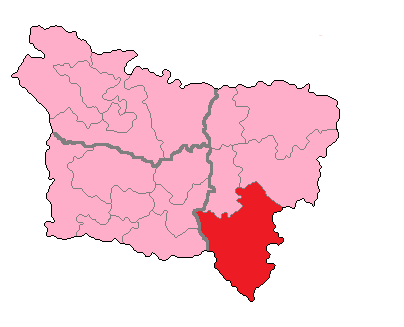
- Aisne's 5th constituency shown within Picardie
- Deputy: Jocelyn Dessigny; RN
- Department: Aisne
- Cantons: Braine, Charly, Château-Thierry, Condé-en-Brie, Fère-en-Tardenois, Neuilly-Saint-Front, Oulchy-le-Château, Vailly-sur-Aisne, Villers-Cotterêts.
- Registered voters: 81,007

The 5th constituency of the Aisne is a French legislative constituency in the Aisne département.

== Description ==
Aisne's 5th constituency covers the southern portion of the department, the area is centred on Château-Thierry on the river Marne.

Politically the seat elected conservatives for all the Fifth Republic with the exceptions of during the Mitterrand years between 1981 and 1993 and after the 2012 election.

At the 2012 election a National Front candidate secured a place in the 2nd round splitting the right's vote and allowing the election of Jacques Krabal of the left leaning PRG. Krabal subsequently switched to the centrist La République En Marche!.

== Historic Representation ==
Election	Member	Party
1958	André Rossi	CD
1962	André Rossi	CD
1967	André Rossi	CD
1968	André Rossi	CD
1973	André Rossi	CD
1978	André Rossi	UDF
1981	Bernard Lefranc	PS
1986	Proportional representation - no election by constituency	
1988	René Dosière	PS
1993	André Rossi	UDF
1994	Renaud Dutreil	UDF
1997	Renaud Dutreil	UDF
2002	Renaud Dutreil	UMP
2002	Daniel Gard	UMP
2007	Isabelle Vasseur	UMP
2012	Jacques Krabal	PRG
2017	Jacques Krabal	REM
2022	Jocelyn Dessigny	National Rally
2024	Jocelyn Dessigny	National Rally

== Election results ==
=== 2024 ===
Candidate	Party	Alliance	First round		Second round	
Candidate	Party	Alliance	Votes	%	Votes	%
Jocelyn Dessigny	RN		27,670	53.07		
Jeanne Doyez-Roussel	RE	Ensemble	10,811	20.73		
Karim Belaïd	Socialist Party (France)	NFP	10,272	19.70		
Jade Gilquin	LR	UDC	2,665	5.11		
Yona Merbouche	LO		721	1.38		
Valid votes			52,139	96.71		
Blank votes						
Null votes			1,029	1.91		
Turnout			53,911	65.34		
Abstentions			28,600	34.66		
Registered voters			82,511			
Result			RN HOLD			

=== 2022 ===
Legislative Election 2022: Aisne's 5th constituency
Party	Candidate	Votes	%	±%
RN	Jocelyn Dessigny	15,572	35.22	+9.62
LFI (NUPÉS)	Stéphane Frère	7,265	18.85	+2.74
LREM (Ensemble)	Jeanne Roussel	6,214	16.12	−19.85
DVC	Sébastien Eugène	6,093	15.81	N/A
LR (UDC)	Jade Gilquin	1,873	4.86	−3.62
REC	Florence Triboulet	1,400	3.63	N/A
PA	Françoise Vacca	892	2.31	+0.47
LP (UPF)	Joffrey Bollée	714	1.85	−0.08
LO	Francis Garcia	515	1.34	+0.12
Turnout		38,538	47.29	−1.79
2nd round result
RN	Jocelyn Dessigny	20,589	62.41	+20.23
LFI (NUPÉS)	Stéphane Frère	12,403	37.59	N/A
Turnout		32,992	45.85	+0.87
RN gain from LREM				

=== 2017 ===
Candidate	Label	First round		Second round	
Candidate	Label	Votes	%	Votes	%
Jacques Krabal	REM	14,206	35.97	19,609	57.82
François de Voyer	FN	10,111	25.60	14,304	42.18
Omar Fenardji	FI	3,939	9.97		
Dominique Moyse	UDI	3,351	8.48		
Sébastien Manscourt	DVD	3,227	8.17		
Dominique Jourdain	ECO	2,426	6.14		
Michelle Sapori	DLF	764	1.93		
Françoise Vacca	DIV	727	1.84		
Sylvie Géret	EXG	480	1.22		
Annick Leclerc	DIV	268	0.68		
Votes		39,499	100.00	33,913	100.00
Valid votes		39,499	97.87	33,913	91.70
Blank votes		609	1.51	2,253	6.09
Null votes		251	0.62	817	2.21
Turnout		40,359	49.08	36,983	44.98
Abstentions		41,864	50.92	45,241	55.02
Registered voters		82,223		82,224	
Source: Ministry of the Interior

=== 2012 ===
Summary of the 10 June and 17 June 2012 French legislative in Aisne's 5th Constituency election results
Candidate	Party		1st round		2nd round	
Candidate	Party		Votes	%	Votes	%
Jacques Krabal	Radical Party of the Left	PRG	14,141	29.79%	20,427	42.21%
Isabelle Vasseur	Union for a Popular Movement	UMP	14,820	31.22%	17,761	36.70%
Frank Briffaut	National Front	FN	10,793	22.74%	10,205	21.09%
Dominique Jourdain	Europe Ecology – The Greens	EELV	4,647	9.79%		
Mireille Ausecache	Left Front	FG	2,115	4.46%		
Sylvie Geret	Far Left	ExG	489	1.03%		
Jean-Claude Poiret	Miscellaneous Right	DVD	466	0.98%		
Total			48,103	100%	49,212	100%
Registered voters			81,017		81,007	
Blank/Void ballots			632	1.31%	819	1.66%
Turnout			47,529	59.37%	47,900	60.75%
Abstentions			32,914	40.63%	31,795	39.25%
Result					PRG gain	

=== 2007 ===
Summary of the 10 June and 17 June 2007 French legislative in Aisne's 5th Constituency election results
Candidate	Party		1st round		2nd round	
Candidate	Party		Votes	%	Votes	%
Isabelle Vasseur	Union for a Popular Movement	UMP	18,088	37.84%	25,167	53.96%
Dominique Jourdain	Socialist Party	PS	9,920	20.75%	21,471	46.04%
Jacques Krabal	Miscellaneous Left	DVG	8,446	17.67%		
Franck Briffaut	National Front	FN	4,023	8.42%		
Renaud Belliere	Democratic Movement	MoDem	2,156	4.51%		
Jean-Luc Allioux	Communist	COM	1,047	2.19%		
Brigitte Fourquet	Far Left	EXG	949	1.99%		
Marie-Thérèse Chambaud	The Greens	VEC	811	1.70%		
Sylvie Geret	Far Left	EXG	780	1.63%		
Olivier Papritz	Movement for France	MPF	625	1.31%		
Annick Deryckere	Hunting, Fishing, Nature, Traditions	CPNT	502	1.05%		
Marc-Hervé Rey	Ecologist	ECO	427	0.89%		
Aude Allegraud	Divers	DIV	30	0.06%		
Total			47,804	100%	46,638	100%
Registered voters			80,005		80,003	
Blank/Void ballots			780	1.61%	1,724	3.56%
Turnout			48,584	60.73%	48,362	60.45%
Abstentions			31,421	39.27%	31,641	39.55%
Result					UMP HOLD	

== Sources ==
- Official results of French elections from 1998: "Résultats électoraux officiels en France" (in French). Archived from the original on 20 December 2011.
