= Daniel Le Meur =

French politician

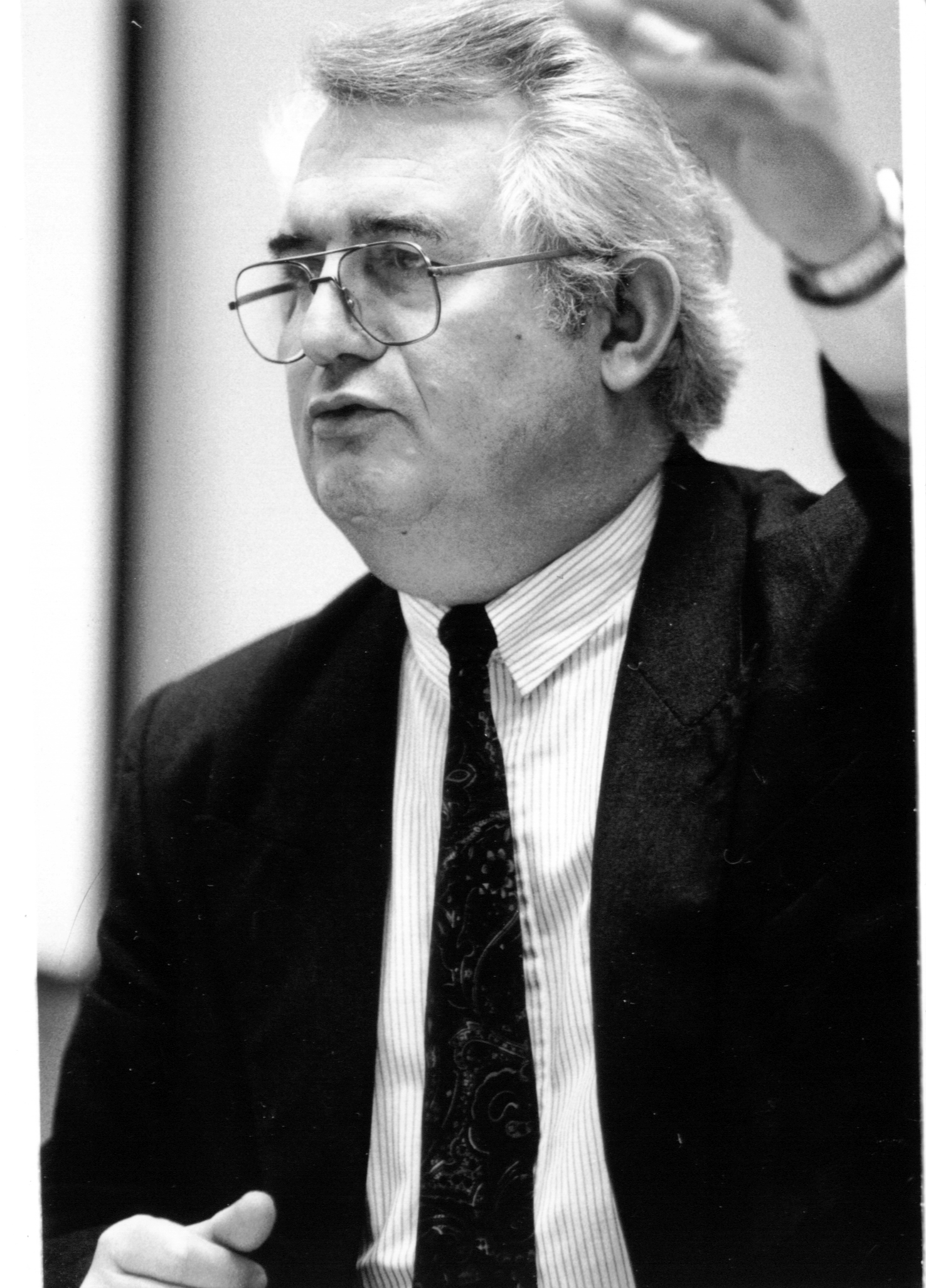

Deputy for Aisne's 2nd constituency
- In office 1973–1986
- Preceded by: Edmond Bricout
- Succeeded by: Self as part of proportional representation by department

Deputy for Aisne
- In office 1986–1988

Deputy for Aisne's 2nd constituency
- In office 1988–1993
- Preceded by: Self as part of proportional representation by department
- Succeeded by: Charles Baur

Mayor of Saint-Quentin, Aisne
- In office 1977–1983

Mayor of Saint-Quentin, Aisne
- In office 1989–1995

Personal details
- Born: 25 July 1939 (age 86); Provins (Seine-et-Marne)

Daniel Le Meur was a French politician. He was the deputy for Aisne's 2nd constituency from 1973 to 1993 (including the 8th legislature (1986-1988), when deputies were elected by proportional representation by department) and the Mayor of Saint-Quentin, Aisne from 1977 to 1983 and from 1989 to 1995. He was a member of the French Communist Party.

== Biography ==
He worked as a metallurgical worker at Motobécane, where he was a CGT delegate in 1965.

He joined the Communist Party in 1956 and was part of the office of the Aisne federation. He was an alternate member of the central committee in February 1976 (XXIIth congress).

He was a Communist deputy for Aisne from 1973 to 1993 and mayor of Saint-Quentin from 1977 to 1983 and then from 1989 to 1995.
