= Eddy Casterman =

French politician (born 1996)

Member of the National Assembly for Aisne's 3rd constituency
- Incumbent
- Assumed office 18 July 2024
- Preceded by: Jean-Louis Bricout

Personal details
- Born: 28 July 1996 (age 30) Lille, France
- Party: Identity-Liberties (2024–present)
- Other political affiliations: LR (until 2021); REC (2021–2024)

Eddy Casterman (born 28 July 1996) is a French politician.

== Biography ==
In 2020 he succeeded Erik Tegnér as the head of the collective “Racines d’avenir”. He was elected in 2020 in the municipality of Englos with 188 votes. He simultaneously held this position as a parliamentary attaché to Orne senator Vincent Segouin of the Les Républicains party. He separated from him on 10 December 2021 when Casterman became involved in Éric Zemmour's campaign in the 2022 French presidential election. While he was deputy for school affairs in the commune of Englos, he stood for Reconquest in Nord's 11th constituency in the 2022 French legislative election where he obtained 3.36% of the votes cast.

During the 2024 French legislative election, he was elected in Aisne's 3rd constituency with 57.6% of the vote defeating the outgoing MP Jean-Louis Bricout who obtained 37.6% of the vote in the first round. Although his candidacy was supported by the National Rally (RN), he defined himself as a miscellaneous right candidate.
