= Aude Bono-Vandorme =

French politician (born 1962)

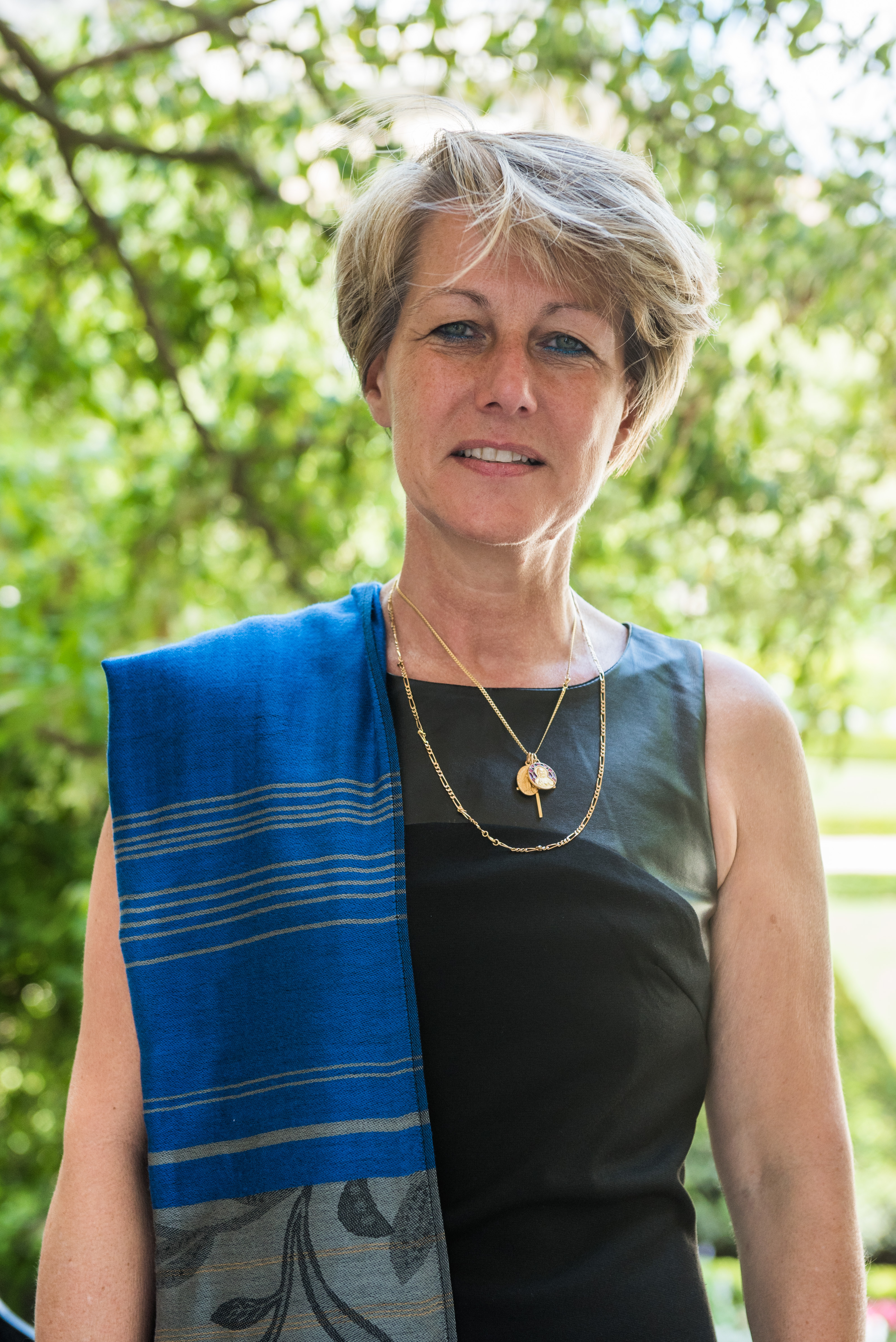
- Aude Bono-Vandorme in 2017

Member of the National Assembly for Aisne's 1st constituency
- In office 21 June 2017 – 21 June 2022
- Preceded by: René Dosière
- Succeeded by: Nicolas Dragon

Member of the Municipal council of Laon
- In office March 2008 – July 2017

Personal details
- Born: Aude Vandorme; 3 August 1962 (age 64) Soissons, France
- Party: La République En Marche!
- Profession: Faculty Member

Aude Bono-Vandorme (née Vandorme; born 3 August 1962) is a French physicist and politician who represented the department of Aisne as member of the party La République En Marche! (LREM) in the French National Assembly from 2017 to 2022.

== Education and early life ==
Bono-Vandorme was born on 3 August 1962 in Soissons. She studied engineering at the École Polytechnique Féminine in Sceaux, Hauts-de-Seine, where she received a doctorate in fluid mechanics.

== Early career ==
Bono-Vandorme subsequently became a faculty member in fluid analysis and mechanics at the École Polytechnique Féminine, as well as a lecturer at the Conservatoire national des arts et métiers and the École Centrale Paris.

== Political career ==
=== Career in local politics ===
Originally a member of the Union for French Democracy and later a member of The Centrists, Bono-Vandorme was elected to the municipal council in Laon in March 2008 on the list of the incumbent Union for a Popular Movement mayor, Antoine Lefèvre, later becoming the deputy mayor. In 2010, she ran in the regional elections of Picardy on the list of Caroline Cayeux, but was not elected. In 2012, Bono-Vandorme ran in Aisne's 1st constituency under the label of the New Center, and was also nominated by the Union for a Popular Movement. She lost a three-way contest in the second round with 38.60% of the vote, against incumbent René Dosière with 42.19% and Fawaz Karimet with 19.21%.

In 2013, Bono-Vandorme became the president of the local branch of the Union of Democrats and Independents in Aisne. Then, in March 2014, she was re-elected as a municipal councilor in Laon on the list of Antoine Lefèvre. She became the premier assistant mayor, a position that she lost in September 2014 following a disagreement with Lefèvre.

=== Member of Parliament, 2017–2022 ===
In January 2017, Bono-Vandorme was chosen by the Union of Democrats and Independents to be a new candidate in Aisne's 1st constituency in the 2017 French legislative election. However, an electoral alliance between the Union of Democrats and Independents and The Republicans in March 2017 caused Bono-Vandorme to lose the party's nomination. Bono-Vandorme did not withdraw her candidacy, choosing to run against The Republicans' candidate Christophe Coulon, and she was suspended from all functions of the Union of Democrats and Independents.

After her suspension, on 18 April 2017, Bono-Vandorme endorsed Emmanuel Macron in the imminent 2017 French presidential election. She drew closer to La République En Marche!, and on 11 May she won the nomination of En Marche! for Aisne's 1st constituency. She was endorsed by the incumbent René Dosière, despite having run against him in 2012.

After coming in first in the first round with 28.79% of the vote, in the second round Bono-Vandorme was elected to the French National Assembly for Aisne's 1st constituency with 56.22% of the vote against 43.78% of the vote for Damien Philippot of the National Rally.

In the National Assembly, Bono-Vandorme is a member of the Committee on European Affairs, the Committee on National Defense of the Armed Forces, and the French delegation to the Parliamentary Assembly of the Organization for Security and Co-operation in Europe (OSCE).

In the 2022 election, she came second in the first round, and lost her seat in the second round to National Rally's Nicolas Dragon.

== Political positions ==
In July 2019, Bono-Vandorme decided not to align with her parliamentary group's majority and became one of 52 LREM members who abstained from a vote on the French ratification of the European Union’s Comprehensive Economic and Trade Agreement (CETA) with Canada.

== Awards ==
- 2011 – Legion of Honour

== See also ==
- 2017 French legislative election
- List of deputies of the 15th National Assembly of France
