= Jacques Krabal =

French politician

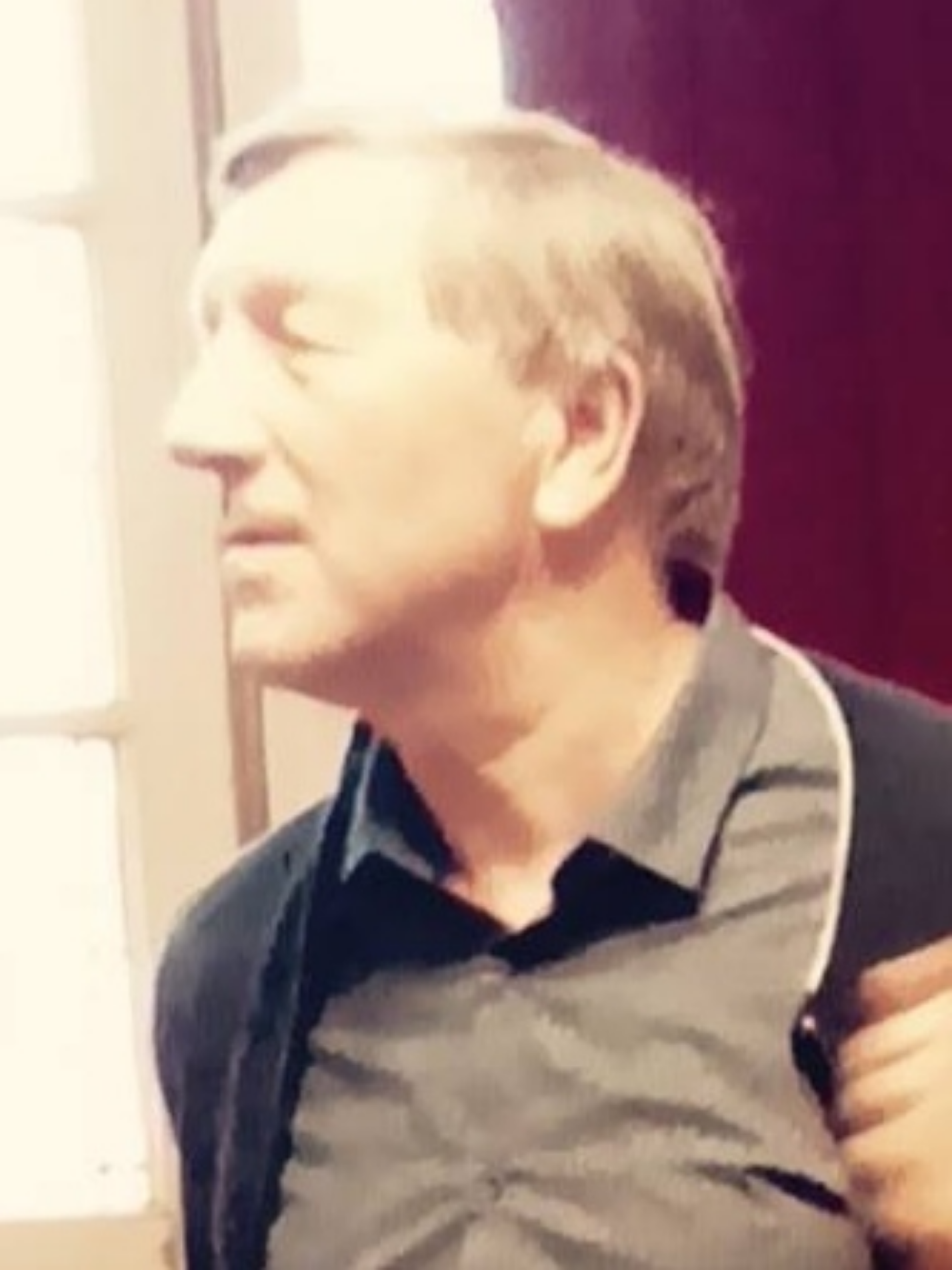
- Jacques Krabal in 2016
- Parliamentary group: RPG (2012-2017); LREM (2017 onwards)

Deputy for Aisne's 5th constituency in the National Assembly of France
- In office 2012 – June 2022
- Preceded by: Isabelle Vasseur
- Succeeded by: Jocelyn Dessigny

Personal details
- Born: 10 April 1948 (age 78) Épieds, Aisne, France

Jacques Krabal (born 10 April 1948) is a French politician. He was elected to the French National Assembly on 17 June 2012, as part of the Radical Party of the Left and re-elected on 18 June 2017, as part of La République En Marche!, representing the 5th constituency of the department of Aisne. He was also elected Château-Thierry's mayor on 20 March 2008 and re-elected on 30 March 2014 until 5 July 2017.

In May 2022, he announced that he would be standing down at the 2022 French legislative election.

== See also ==
- 2017 French legislative election
