= Bohain-en-Vermandois =

- Commune
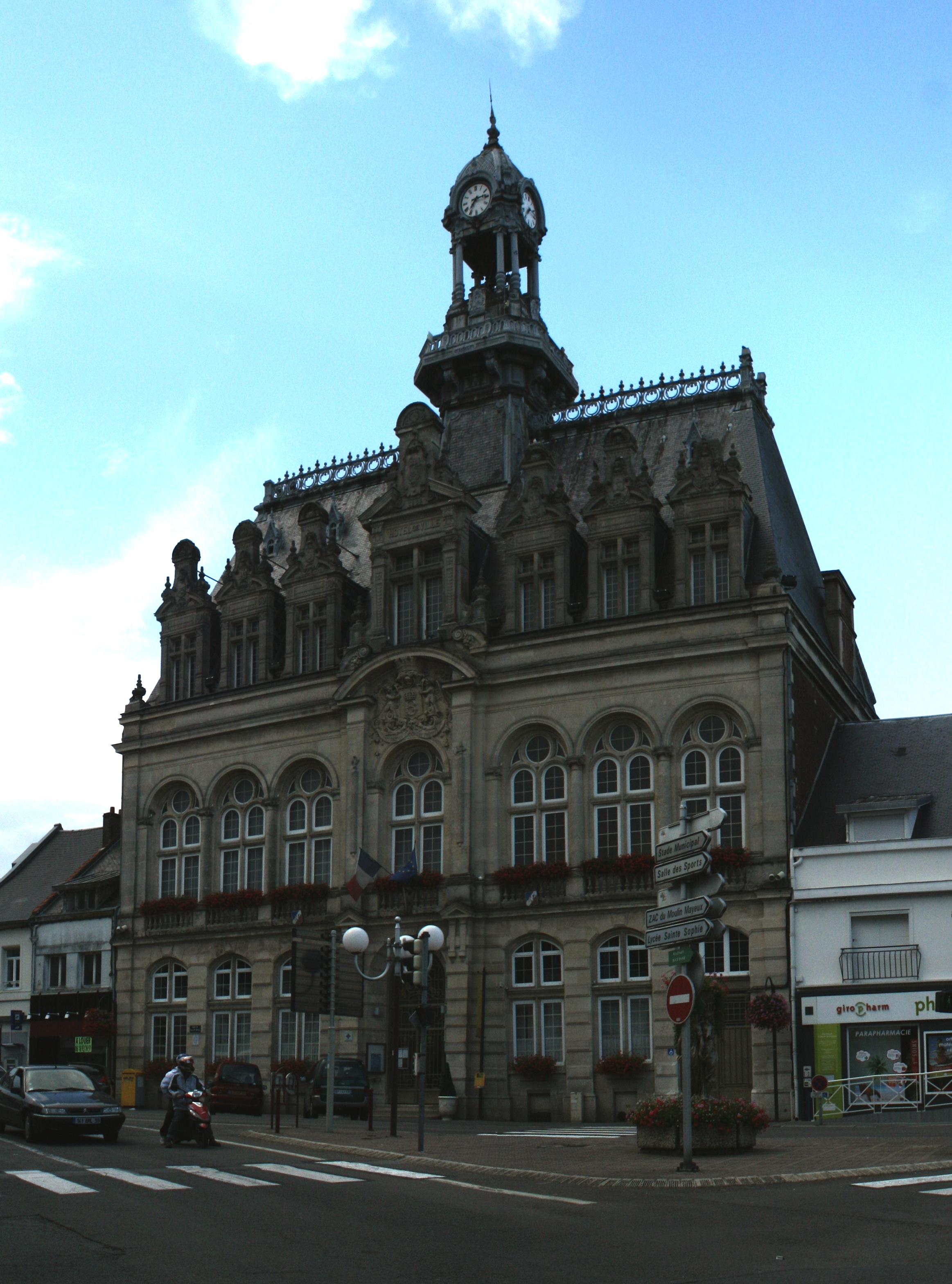
- Town hall

- Coat of arms
- Location of Bohain-en-Vermandois
- Location within France Location within Hauts-de-France
- Coordinates: 49°59′11″N 3°27′15″E
- Country: France
- Region: Hauts-de-France
- Department: Aisne
- Arrondissement: Saint-Quentin
- Canton: Bohain-en-Vermandois
- Intercommunality: Pays du Vermandois

Government
  - Mayor (2026–32): Yann Rojo
- Area^{1}: 31.74 km^{2} (12.25 sq mi)
- Elevation: 130 m (430 ft)
- Highest elevation: 164 m (538 ft)
- Lowest elevation: 121 m (397 ft)
- Population (2023): 5,605
  - Density: 176.6/km^{2} (457.4/sq mi)
- Time zone: UTC+01:00 (CET)
  - Summer (DST): UTC+02:00 (CEST)
- INSEE/Postal code: 02095 /02110
- ^{1} French Land Register data, which excludes lakes, ponds, glaciers > 1 km^{2} (0.386 sq mi or 247 acres) and river estuaries.

Bohain-en-Vermandois (Picard: Bohain-in-Vérmindos) is a commune in the department of Aisne in Hauts-de-France in northern France.

It is the place where the painter Henri Matisse grew up.

== Etymology ==
Formerly called Bohain, the town acquired its current name, Bohain-en-Vermandois, on 8 June 1956. Bohain was previously known as Buchammum (in Latin, attested 12th century) and Bohang (in Old French, attested 1138). Bohain derives from the anthroponym Bodo/Bolo, itself derived from a Germanic root, possibly Old Saxon bodo. The suffix -ain additionally points to a Germanic root -heim, which later transformed into either -ham and -hem. The suffix later developed into -ain (via -ham). William Robert Caljouw believes that this etymology is typically Saxon in origin, and possibly indicative of "Saxon colonisation" along the "coastal regions" of modern-day France.

== History ==
Ownership of the territory changed frequently during the medieval period, and Bohain continued to find its lordship disputed in the wars of the early modern period. Traces of fortifications (ditches, cannonballs, bases of walls) can not only be found near to the primary school, but also in other spots of the town.

In its past, Bohain being unequivocally incorporated within France, industry and trading developed and the town became a major center for the textile industry. In parish records from the 17th century one of the most frequent occupations registered was that of "mulquinier", although the term is generally used to refer to fine fabrics craftworkers, it seems likely that in these very same records the term was also applied to anyone who worked at the weaver's trade. It is recorded that Napoleon ordered a Bohainais weaver to work for the Empress Joséphine. The old textile factories have closed one after another, but weaving is still considered as a local tradition.

It has been reported that the Lord (seigneur) of Bohain gave up Joan of Arc to the English during the Hundred Years' War.

== Population ==
Historical population

Year	Pop.	±% p.a.
1793	2,100	—
1800	2,152	+0.35%
1806	2,346	+1.45%
1821	2,558	+0.58%
1831	3,024	+1.69%
1836	3,393	+2.33%
1841	3,561	+0.97%
1846	3,998	+2.34%
1851	4,166	+0.83%
1856	4,501	+1.56%
1861	5,038	+2.28%
1866	5,322	+1.10%
1872	6,005	+2.03%
1876	6,005	+0.00%
1881	6,684	+2.17%
1886	6,705	+0.06%
1891	6,980	+0.81%
1896	7,423	+1.24%
1901	6,839	−1.63%

Year	Pop.	±% p.a.
1906	6,788	−0.15%
1911	6,877	+0.26%
1921	5,917	−1.49%
1926	6,475	+1.82%
1931	6,614	+0.43%
1936	6,246	−1.14%
1946	5,833	−0.68%
1954	6,151	+0.67%
1962	6,726	+1.12%
1968	7,090	+0.88%
1975	7,513	+0.83%
1982	7,271	−0.47%
1990	6,955	−0.55%
1999	6,600	−0.58%
2007	6,213	−0.75%
2012	5,841	−1.23%
2017	5,664	−0.61%
2023	5,605	−0.17%

Source: EHESS and INSEE (1968-2023)

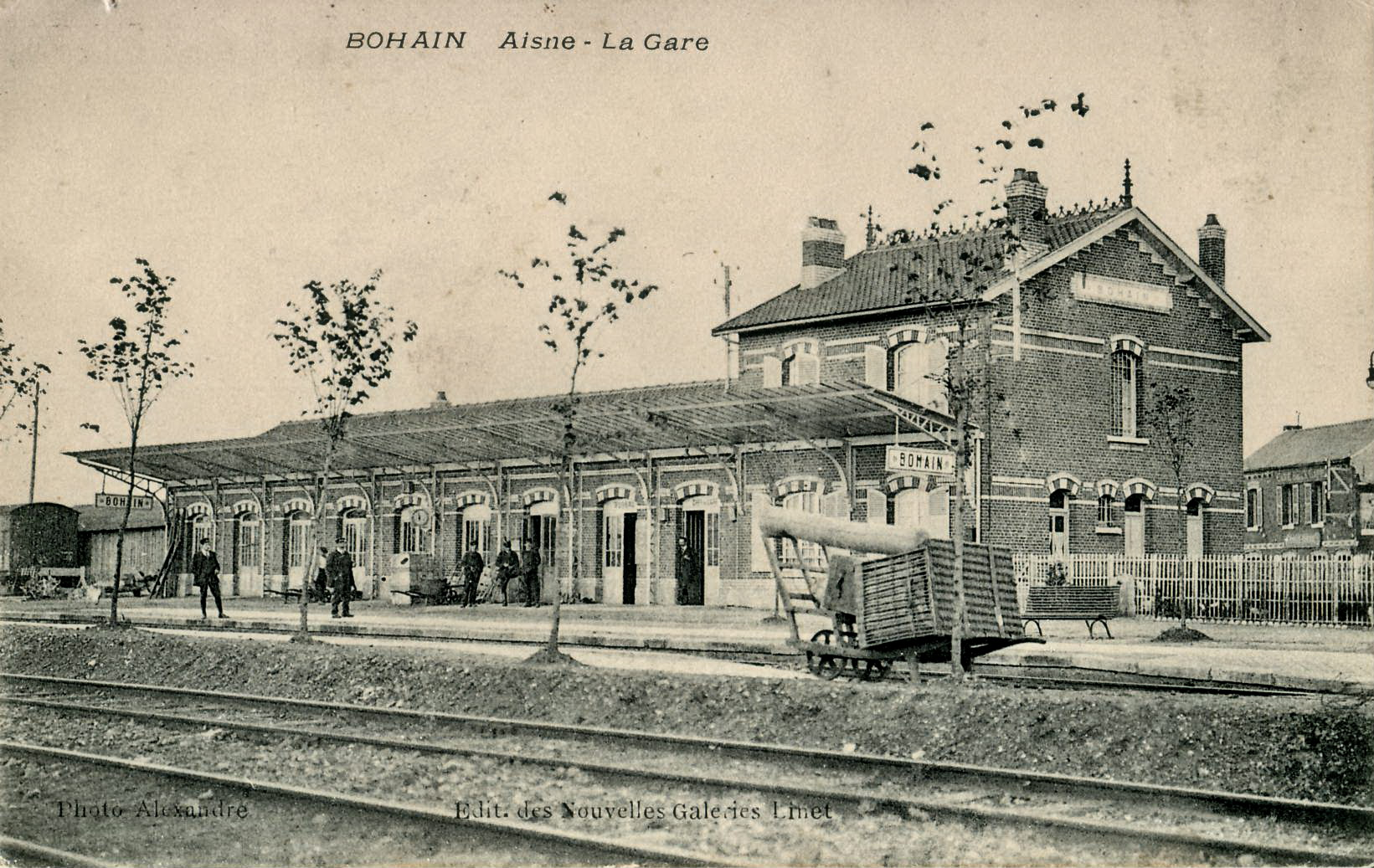
The station at Bohain early in the 20th century

== See also ==
- Communes of the Aisne department
