= Gregory C. Horn =

The Reverend Gregory C. Horn D.Min. Ph.D.
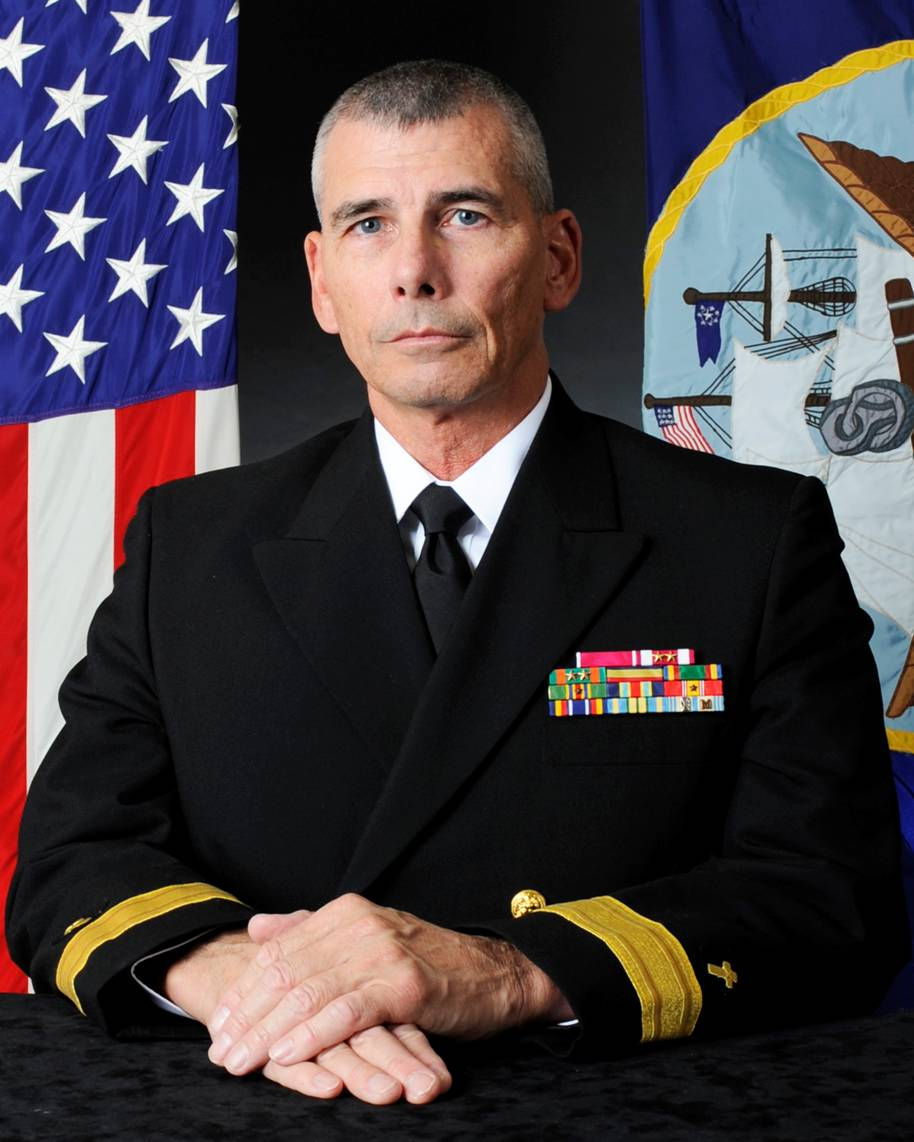

17th Deputy Chief of Chaplains for Reserve Matters & Director of Religious Programs, US Marine Corps Reserve
- In office October 07, 2010 – October 01, 2013
- Succeeded by: Daniel L. Gard

Personal details
- Born: May 6, 1953 (age 73) Pasadena, CA
- Spouse: Katherine Marie (Mackel) Horn
- Children: Jessica, Evans
- Education: Point Loma Nazarene University (B.A.); Fuller Theological Seminary (M.Div., D.Min., Ph.D.)

Military service
- Allegiance: United States
- Branch/service: United States Navy
- Years of service: 1988–2013
- Rear Admiral

Gregory Curtis Horn (born May 6, 1953) is a Rear Admiral in the United States Navy. He retired in 2013 as 17th Deputy Chief of Chaplains for Reserve Matters and Director of Religious Programs, Marine Forces Reserve.

Rear Admiral Horn, a Pasadena, Calif., native, attended the University of Southern California and transferred to Point Loma Nazarene University in San Diego, CA where he graduated with a BA in Psychology in 1976. He then earned a Master of Divinity in 1979 and the Doctor of Ministry in 1985 from Fuller Theological Seminary in Pasadena, Calif. In 2007, he was awarded the Doctor of Philosophy in Practical Theology and Ethics from Fuller Seminary's Center for Advanced Theological Studies.

Commissioned a lieutenant in 1988, Horn's Navy Reserve tours included: USS Bristol County (LST 1198); Naval Hospital San Diego; Naval Mobile Construction Battalion 17. He also served as Assistant Fleet chaplain, Commander, Submarine Forces Pacific.

Horn's Reserve Marine Corps assignments as command chaplain included: 4th Light Armored Reconnaissance Battalion; 23rd Marine Regiment (lead Reserve element in Advanced Warfighting Experiment: Urban Warrior); and Marine Aircraft Group 46.

In February 2003 Horn was recalled to active duty in support of Operations Enduring Freedom and Iraqi Freedom as Command Chaplain, 3rd Marine Aircraft Wing RBE, and subsequently as the acting Wing Chaplain.

After mobilization, Horn returned to the Reserve Component and was selected to be Deputy Force Chaplain, Reserve Matters, Marine Forces Pacific, Camp Smith HI. In December 2006, he was promoted to captain and selected to serve as the Deputy Chaplain of the Marine Corps for Reserve Matters, Headquarters U.S. Marine Corps, Pentagon, Washington DC. This was followed in December 2009, when Horn was selected as the Deputy Chaplain, Commander Navy Installations Command at the Washington Navy Yard..

On October 7, 2010, Horn was promoted to rear admiral (lower half) and assumed the position on the staff of the Chief of Naval Operations as the 17th Deputy Chief of Chaplains for Reserve Matters and Director of Religious Programs, Marine Forces Reserves. He retired from the Navy on October 1, 2013.

An ordained Presbyterian Church USA minister, Horn has been the Pastor and Head of Staff at Westminster Presbyterian Church, Bakersfield, Calif. since January 1986, where he continues to serve. Rear Admiral Horn is married to Katherine Marie (Mackel) Horn of Pasadena who is a CPA with a major Oil Company. They have two children. Jessica is a Navy chaplain on active duty, and Evans is a beverage director in the hotel and restaurant industry.

Rear Admiral Horn is authorized to wear the Legion of Merit (2 awards), Meritorious Service Medal (3 awards) and the Navy Achievement Medal (3 awards). In addition he was awarded the Presidential Unit Citation, the Navy Unit Citation, the Navy and Marine Corps Meritorious Unit citation, the Fleet Marine Force ribbon and various service awards.

== Career ==
Commissioned an officer in 1988, Horn has served aboard the USS Bristol County (LST-1198), as well as with the 4th Light Armored Reconnaissance Battalion, 23rd Marine Regiment and Marine Aircraft Group 46.

In 2003, he was recalled from reserve duty to active duty to serve in the War in Afghanistan (2001–present) and the Iraq War with the 3rd Marine Aircraft Wing. Following mobilization, Horn was assigned to be deputy force chaplain, Reserve Matters, Marine Forces Pacific. He was later assigned to Headquarters Marine Corps.

Awards he has received include the Legion of Merit, two award stars; the Meritorious Service Medal with two award stars and the Navy Achievement Medal with two award stars.
