= Jacques Desallangre =

French politician (1935–2020)

Member of the French National Assembly for Aisne's 4th constituency
- In office 12 June 1997 – 20 June 2012
- Preceded by: Emmanuelle Bouquillon
- Succeeded by: Marie-Françoise Bechtel

Personal details
- Born: 6 September 1935 Châlons-en-Champagne (Marne)
- Died: 17 January 2020 (aged 84)
- Party: PG
- Other political affiliations: MDC (1997–2002), DVG (2002–2008)

Jacques Desallangre (6 September 1935 – 17 January 2020) was a member of the National Assembly of France. He represented the Aisne department, and was a member of the Gauche démocrate et républicaine.

Desallangre was born in Châlons-en-Champagne, Marne. Formerly a left-wing independent, he joined the new Left Party in November 2008.
