= Aisne's 1st constituency =

Constituency of the National Assembly of France

1st constituency of the Aisne
- inline Constituency of the National Assembly of France

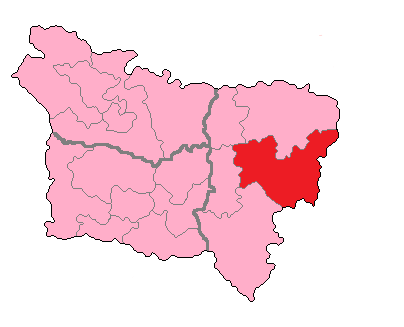
- Aisne's 1st constituency shown within Picardie
- Deputy: Nicolas Dragon; RN
- Department: Aisne
- Cantons: Anizy-le-Château, Craonne, Crécy-sur-Serre, La Fère, Laon Nord, Laon Sud, Neufchâtel-sur-Aisne, Rozoy-sur-Serre, Sissonne
- Registered voters: 72,613

The 1st constituency of the Aisne is a French legislative constituency in the Aisne département.

== Description ==
Aisne's 1st constituency stretches from the centre of the department to its eastern border, and includes the city of Laon. The seat was held by one man, René Dosière, from 1988 to 2017, with the exception of between 1993 and 1997, when it was captured the Gaullist RPR.

Unusually the second round at the 2012 election featured two candidates from the left René Dosière and Fawaz Karimet of the official Socialist Party.

The constituency was taken by Aude Bono-Vandorme as part of the En Marche! landslide victory in the 2017 election.

== Historic Representation ==
Election	Member	Party
1958	Gilbert Devèze	CNIP
1962	Guy Sabatier	UNR
1967	Guy Sabatier	UDR
1968	Guy Sabatier	UDR
1973	Robert Aumont	PS
1978	Robert Aumont	PS
1981	Robert Aumont	PS
1986	Proportional representation - no election by constituency	
1988	René Dosière	PS
1993	Jean-Claude Lamant	RPR
1997	René Dosière	PS
2007	René Dosière	DVG
2012	René Dosière	DVG
2017	Aude Bono-Vandorme	LREM
2022	Nicolas Dragon	NR
2024	Nicolas Dragon	NR

== Election results ==
=== 2024 ===
Candidate	Party	Alliance	First round		Second round	
Candidate	Party	Alliance	Votes	%	Votes	%
Jean-Loup Pernelle	LO		701	1.54		
Nicolas Dragon	RN		24,774	54.49		
Charles Culioli	PS	NFP	8,654	19.05		
Matthieu Léon Boufflet	DIV		316	0.69		
Damien Delavenne	RE	Ensemble	10,380	22.83		
Philippe Tréguier	REC		644	1.42		
Valid votes			45,469	96.56		
Blank votes			1,189	2.53		
Null votes			429	0.91		
Turnout			47,087	65.35		
Abstentions			24,968	34.65		
Registered voters			72,055			
Result			NR HOLD			

=== 2022 ===
Candidate	Party	Alliance	First round		Second round	
Candidate	Party	Alliance	Votes	%	Votes	%
Nicolas Dragon	RN		11,245	33.14	17,049	54.53
Aude Bono-Vandorme	LREM	Ensemble	7,939	23.40	14,217	45.47
Olivier Fenioux	LFI	NUPES	6,463	19.05		
Paul Mougenot	LR	UDC	3,853	11.35		
Carole Ribeiro	DVD		2,052	6.05		
Benjamin Cauchy	REC		1,312	3.87		
Michel Degouy	DLF	DSV	570	1.68		
Jean-Loup Pernelle	LO		500	1.47		
Valid votes			33,934	97.77	31,266	92.68
Blank votes			546	1.57	1,869	5.54
Null votes			227	0.65	602	1.78
Turnout			34,707	47.89	33,737	46.54
Abstentions			37,772	52.11	38,746	53.46
Registered voters			72,479		72,483	
Result			RN GAIN FROM LREM			

=== 2017 ===
Candidate	Label	First round		Second round	
Candidate	Label	Votes	%	Votes	%
Aude Bono-Vandorme	REM	10,043	28.79	16,684	56.22
Damien Philippot	FN	9,114	26.13	12,994	43.78
Christophe Coulon	LR	5,653	16.20		
Fawaz Karimet	PS	4,856	13.92		
Jean-Marc Chamblay	FI	2,479	7.11		
Brigitte Fournié-Turquin	ECO	1,306	3.74		
Jacques Ferrand	DLF	491	1.41		
Jean-Loup Pernelle	EXG	424	1.22		
Antoine Goblet	DIV	260	0.75		
Éric Boulay	DIV	259	0.74		
Votes		34,885	100.00	29,678	100.00
Valid votes		34,885	98.06	29,678	90.58
Blank votes		517	1.45	2,262	6.90
Null votes		173	0.49	824	2.51
Turnout		35,575	49.17	32,764	45.29
Abstentions		36,770	50.83	39,583	54.71
Registered voters		72,345		72,347	
Source: Ministry of the Interior

=== 2012 ===
Summary of the 10 June and 17 June 2012 French legislative in Aisne's 1st Constituency election results
Candidate	Party		1st round		2nd round	
Candidate	Party		Votes	%	Votes	%
René Dosiere	Miscellaneous Left	DVG	12,416	29.11%	17,460	42.19%
Aude Bono	New Centre-Presidential Majority	NC	11,297	26.49%	15,974	38.60%
Fawaz Karimet	Socialist Party	PS	9,157	21.47%	7,950	19.21%
Jean-Louis Roux	National Front	FN	6,743	15.81%		
Claudine Brunet	Left Front	FG	1,629	3.82%		
Claire Bril	Ecologist	ECO	335	0.78%		
Marie-Paule Gosset	Miscellaneous Right	DVD	306	0.72%		
Jean-Loup Pernelle	Far Left	EXG	285	0.67%		
Carole Philippot	Ecologist	ECO	265	0.62%		
Damien Peiffer	Miscellaneous Right	DVD	222	0.52%		
Total			42,654	100%	41,384	100%
Registered voters			72,620		72,613	
Blank/Void ballots			510	1.18%	972	2.29%
Turnout			43,164	59.44%	42,356	58.33%
Abstentions			29,456	40.56%	30,257	41.67%
Result					DVG HOLD	

=== 2007 ===
Summary of the 10 June and 17 June 2007 French legislative in Aisne's 1st Constituency election results
Candidate	Party		1st round		2nd round	
Candidate	Party		Votes	%	Votes	%
René Dosiere	Miscellaneous Left	DVG	10,916	25.06%	24,499	56.28%
Gaëdic Blanchard-Douchain	Union for a Popular Movement	UMP	12,902	29.62%	19,028	43.72%
Fawz Karimet	Socialist Party	PS	8,786	20.17%		
Jean-Louis Roux	National Front	FN	2,476	5.68%		
Eric Delhaye	Democratic Movement	MoDem	1,961	4.50%		
Nicolas Trevillot	Miscellaneous Right	DVD	1,185	2.72%		
Paul Henry Hansen-Catta	Divers	DIV	1,130	2.59%		
Claudine Brunet	Communist	COM	918	2.11%		
Marie-Claude Laffiac	Far Left	EXG	875	2.01%		
Catherine Arribas	The Greens	VEC	814	1.87%		
Sylvie Legras	Movement for France	MPF	649	1.49%		
Jean-Loup Pernelle	Far Left	EXG	600	1.38%		
Louisette Bibaut	Hunting, Fishing, Nature, Traditions	CPNT	264	0.61%		
Pascal Matis	Divers	DIV	83	0.19%		
Total			VALID VOTES	100%	VALID VOTES	100%
Registered voters			43,559		43,527	
Blank/Void ballots			830	1.87%	1,420	3.16%
Turnout			44,389	61.35%	44,947	62.12%
Abstentions			27,960	38.65%	27,409	37.88%
Result					DVG GAIN	

== Sources ==
- Official results of French elections from 1998: "Résultats électoraux officiels en France" (in French). Archived from the original on 20 December 2011.
