= Jean-Louis Bricout =

French politician (born 1957)

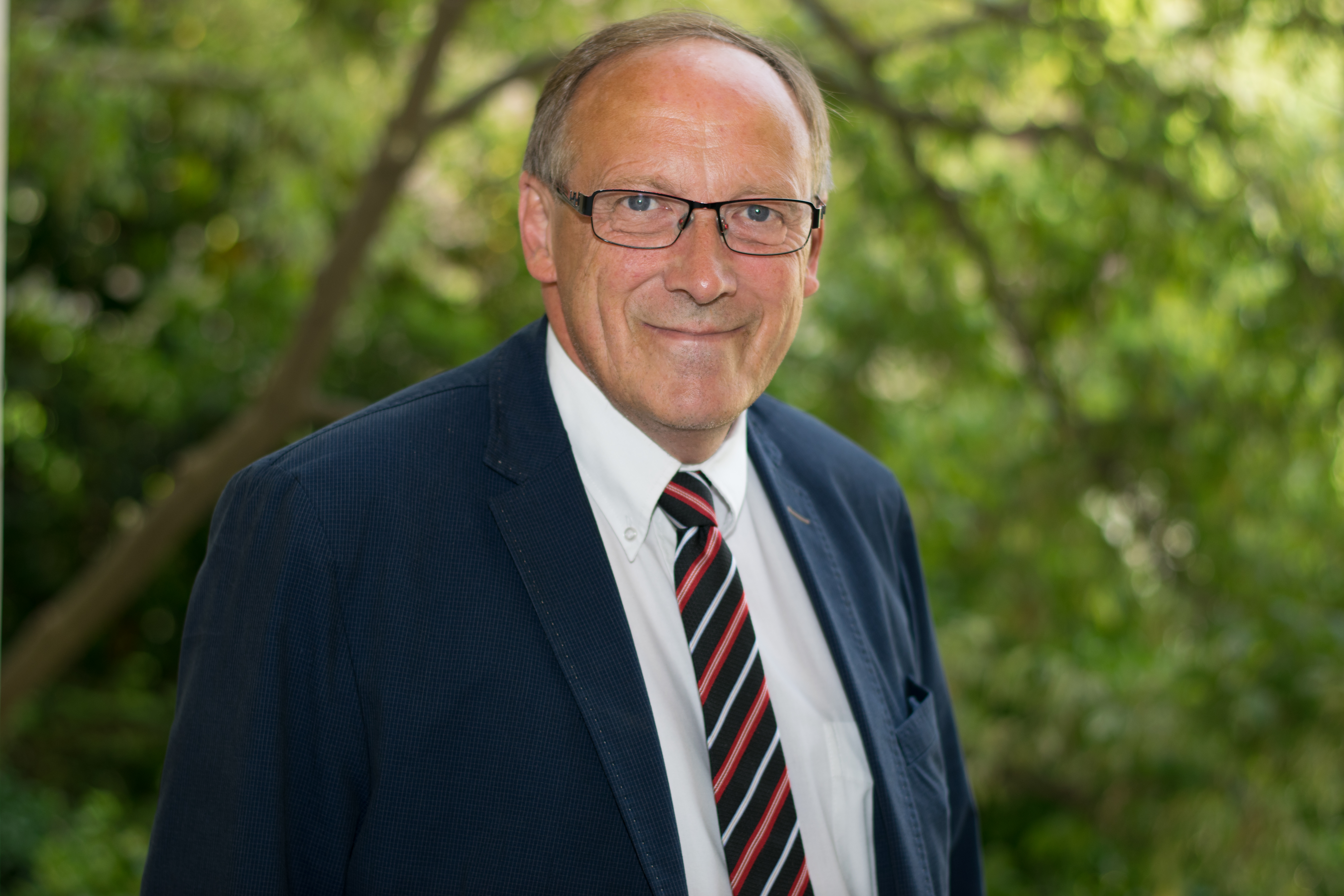
- Bricout at the National Assembly in June 2017

Member of the National Assembly for Aisne's 3rd constituency
- In office 20 June 2012 – 9 June 2024
- Preceded by: Jean-Pierre Balligand
- Succeeded by: Eddy Casterman
- Parliamentary group: Socialist

Mayor of Bohain-en-Vermandois
- In office 17 March 2008 – 21 June 2017
- Preceded by: Daniel Dormion
- Succeeded by: Yann Rojo

Regional Councillor of Picardy
- In office 22 March 2010 – 30 June 2012

Personal details
- Born: 27 December 1957 (age 68) Busigny, France
- Party: Socialist

Jean-Louis Bricout (French pronunciation: [ʒɑ̃ lwi bʁiku]; born 27 December 1957) is a French politician who served as Member of the National Assembly for Aisne's 3rd constituency from 2012 to 2024. He is affiliated with the Socialist Party (PS) and previously worked as his predecessor Jean-Pierre Balligand's parliamentary assistant.

== Biography ==
Bricout was born on 27 December 1957 in Busigny, Nord, to a working-class family. He completed his higher education in Saint-Quentin, Aisne and then worked for France Telecom. In 2001, Bricout was elected as a municipal councillor of Bohain-en-Vermandois. He left France Telecom in 2006 to become parliamentary assistant to Jean-Pierre Balligand, the Member of the National Assembly for Aisne's 3rd constituency. During the 2008 French municipal elections, Bricout was elected mayor of Bohain-en-Vermandois. He additionally became a regional councillor of Picardie in 2010.

Balligand announced on 15 December 2011 that he would not seek re-election in the next legislative elections, prompting Bricout to declare his candidacy to succeed him on 2 January 2012. Initially, there was speculation in the local press that Jean-Jacques Thomas, the mayor of Hirson and general councillor, would also contest the Socialist nomination, but Thomas eventually announced on 14 January that he would not be a candidate. Bricout's campaign thus officially began on 10 February.

That May, Bricout announced that Michel Lefèvre, the mayor of Rougeries and general councillor of the canton of Sains-Richaumont, would be his designated substitute. However, Lefèvre died in a car accident on 1 June, less than one week before the first round of the election. Consequently, Bricout had to select a new substitute: Thierry Thomas, the mayor of Boué and general councillor of the canton of Nouvion-en-Thiérarche.

In the ensuing first round of the 2012 French legislative elections, Bricout received 41.1% of the vote against the Union for a Popular Movement (UMP)'s Frédéric Meura, who received 32.04%, and the Front National (FN)'s Bertrand Dutheil de La Rochère, who received 16.3%. Bricout then won the second round with 54.30% of the vote, compared to Meura's 45.7%.

Bricout took office as a Member of the National Assembly on 20 June 2012, resigning from the regional council of Picardy due to the law on the accumulation of mandates.

On 23 March 2014, Bricout was re-elected as mayor of Bohain-en-Vermandois with 63.6% of the vote in the first round, against deputy mayor Sylvie Roy of the Miscellaneous left (DVG) and 21-year-old Ludovic Bersillion of the Miscellaneous right (DVG).

On 18 June 2017, Bricout was re-elected to the National Assembly with 60.45% of the vote against Paul-Henry Hansen-Catta of the FN, who obtained 39.55%. Due to the law on the accumulation of mandates, he resigned as mayor and was succeeded by Yann Rojo on 26 June 2017. Bricout subsequently resigned from Bohain-en-Vermandois' municipal council as well on 16 October 2017.

In May 2022, Bricout joined the Nouvelle Union Populaire écologique et sociale (NUPES), a coalition including the PS, for his re-election campaign in the 2022 French legislative election.

In the 2024 French legislative election, Bricout was unseated in the first round by Eddy Casterman from the National Rally.

== Elected offices ==
=== Bohain-en-Vermandois ===
- 3 March 2001 – 16 March 2008: Deputy mayor of Bohain-en-Vermandois
- 17 March 2008 – 21 June 2017: Mayor of Bohain-en-Vermandois
- 21 June 2017 – 16 October 2017: Municipal councillor of Bohain-en-Vermandois

=== Regional council of Picardy ===
- 22 March 2010 – 30 June 2012: Regional councillor

=== National Assembly ===
- 20 June 2012 – 9 June 2024: Member of the National Assembly for Aisne's 3rd constituency

== See also ==
- 2017 French legislative election
- 2022 French legislative election
