= Aisne's 3rd constituency =

Constituency of the National Assembly of France

3rd constituency of Aisne
- inline Constituency of the National Assembly of France

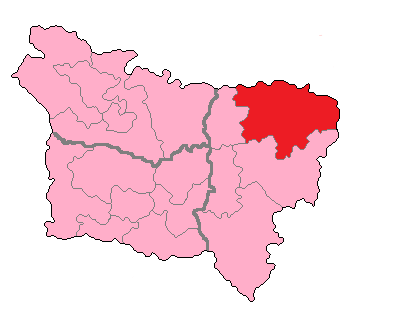
- Aisne's 3rd Constituency shown within Picardie
- Deputy: Eddy Casterman; National Rally
- Department: Aisne
- Cantons: Aubenton, Bohain-en-Vermandois, La Capelle, Guise, Hirson, Marle, Le Nouvion-en-Thiérache, Ribemont, Sains-Richaumont, Vervins, Wassigny
- Registered voters: 70,285

The 3rd constituency of Aisne is a French legislative constituency in the Aisne département.

== Description ==
Aisne's 3rd constituency covers the north east portion of the department.

The seat has been continuously controlled by the Socialist Party and its predecessor the SFIO since 1967.

== Historic Representation ==
Election	Member	Party
1958	Edouard Alliot	CNIP
1962	Jean Risbourg	UNR
1967	Maurice Brugnon	SFIO
1968	Maurice Brugnon	SFIO
1973	Maurice Brugnon	PS
1978	Maurice Brugnon	PS
1981	Jean-Pierre Balligand	PS
1986	Proportional representation - no election by constituency	
1988	Jean-Pierre Balligand	PS
1993	Jean-Louis Bricout	PS
1997	Jean-Louis Bricout	PS
2002	Jean-Louis Bricout	PS
2007	Jean-Louis Bricout	PS
2012	Jean-Louis Bricout	PS
2017	Jean-Louis Bricout	PS
2022	Jean-Louis Bricout	PS
2024	Eddy Casterman	National Rally

== Election results ==
=== 2024 ===
Candidate	Party	Alliance	First round		Second round	
Candidate	Party	Alliance	Votes	%	Votes	%
Eddy Casterman	RN		23,577	57.64		
Jean-Louis Bricout	DVG		15,385	37.62		
Damien Créon	DLF		1,165	2.85		
Laetitia Voisin	LO		763	1.87		
Anne-Marie Fournier	REC		11	0.03		
Valid votes			40,901	96.60		
Blank votes			952	2.25		
Null votes			487	1.15		
Turnout			42,340	64.16		
Abstentions			23,648	35.84		
Registered voters			65,988			
Result			RN GAIN			

=== 2022 ===
Candidate	Party	Alliance	First round		Second round	
Candidate	Party	Alliance	Votes	%	Votes	%
Jean-Louis Bricout	PS	NUPES	13,518	45.88	15,612	54.93
Paul-Henry Hansen-Catta	RN		9,518	32.31	12,809	45.07
Jérome Moineuse	LR	UDC	3,584	12.17		
Hervé Bernardeau	REC		1,617	5.49		
Laetitia Voisin	LO		762	2.59		
Agnès Chotin	LP	DSV	462	1.57		
Valid votes			29,461	97.12	28,421	94.66
Blank votes			626	2.06	1,137	3.79
Null votes			248	0.82	467	1.56
Turnout			30,335	45.47	30,025	45.00
Abstentions			36,374	54.53	36,693	55.00
Registered voters			66,709		66,718	
Result			PS HOLD			

=== 2017 ===
Candidate	Label	First round		Second round	
Candidate	Label	Votes	%	Votes	%
Paul-Henry Hansen-Catta	FN	8,113	25.51	11,487	39.55
Jean-Louis Bricout	PS	7,556	23.76	17,558	60.45
Alain Husillos-Crespo	MoDem	5,755	18.10		
Laurent Marlot	LR	4,841	15.22		
Alexandra Mortet	FI	2,352	7.40		
Philippe Torre	DLF	1,242	3.91		
Christophe Parent	ECO	767	2.41		
Aurélien Gall	PCF	613	1.93		
Laëtitia Voisin	EXG	358	1.13		
Clémence Théry-Hermain	DIV	207	0.65		
Votes		31,804	100.00	29,045	100.00
Valid votes		31,804	97.17	29,045	92.68
Blank votes		639	1.95	1,606	5.12
Null votes		287	0.88	687	2.19
Turnout		32,730	48.06	31,338	46.03
Abstentions		35,369	51.94	36,747	53.97
Registered voters		68,099		68,085	
Source: Ministry of the Interior

=== 2012 ===
Summary of the 10 June and 17 June 2012 French legislative in Aisne's 3rd Constituency election results
Candidate	Party		1st round		2nd round	
Candidate	Party		Votes	%	Votes	%
Jean-Louis Bricout	Socialist Party	PS	16,683	41.10%	21,751	54.31%
Frédéric Meura	Union for a Popular Movement	UMP	13,005	32.04%	18,301	45.69%
Bertrant Dutheil de la Rochere	National Front	FN	6,617	16.30%		
Régis Lecoyer	Left Front	FG	1,888	4.65%		
Pierre Chabot	Far Right	EXD	619	1.53%		
France Savelli	Radical Party	PRV	535	1.32%		
Jean-Pierre Vitu	Far Left	EXG	377	0.93%		
Didier Colpin	Miscellaneous Right	DVD	354	0.87%		
Jean-Claude Pagniez	Miscellaneous Right	DVD	327	0.81%		
Joël Pichonnier	Miscellaneous Left	DVG	185	0.46%		
Total			40,590	100%	40,052	100%
Registered voters			70,292		70,285	
Blank/Void ballots			791	1.91%	1,361	3.29%
Turnout			41,381	58.87%	41,413	58.92%
Abstentions			28,911	41.13%	28,872	41.08%
Result					PS HOLD	

=== 2007 ===
Summary of the 10 June and 17 June 2007 French legislative in Aisne's 3rd Constituency election results
Candidate	Party		1st round		2nd round	
Candidate	Party		Votes	%	Votes	%
Jean-Pierre Balligand	Socialist Party	PS	18,046	41.16%	24,383	53.31%
Frédéric Meura	Union for a Popular Movement	UMP	15,889	36.24%	21,354	46.69%
Nathalie Fauvergue	National Front	FN	3,278	7.48%		
Ginette Devaux	Communist	COM	1,573	3.59%		
Edwin Legris	Democratic Movement	MoDem	1,499	3.42%		
Dimitri Severac	Far Left	EXG	947	2.16%		
Valérie Delattre	The Greens	VEC	616	1.41%		
Andrée Flamengt	Hunting, Fishing, Nature, Traditions	CPNT	507	1.16%		
Marc Pailler	Far Left	EXG	467	1.07%		
Véronique Ballot	Movement for France	MPF	432	0.99%		
Raymonde Remy	Far Right	EXD	234	0.53%		
Isabelle Maillet	Ecologist	ECO	216	0.49%		
Monique Choain	Divers	DIV	138	0.31%		
Total			43,842	100%	45,737	100%
Registered voters			72,227		72,224	
Blank/Void ballots			898	2.01%	1,255	2.67%
Turnout			44,740	61.94%	46,992	65.06%
Abstentions			27,487	38.06%	25,232	34.94%
Result					PS HOLD	

== Sources ==
- Official results of French elections from 1998: "Résultats électoraux officiels en France" (in French). Archived from the original on 20 December 2011.
