= Jean-Pierre Balligand =

French politician

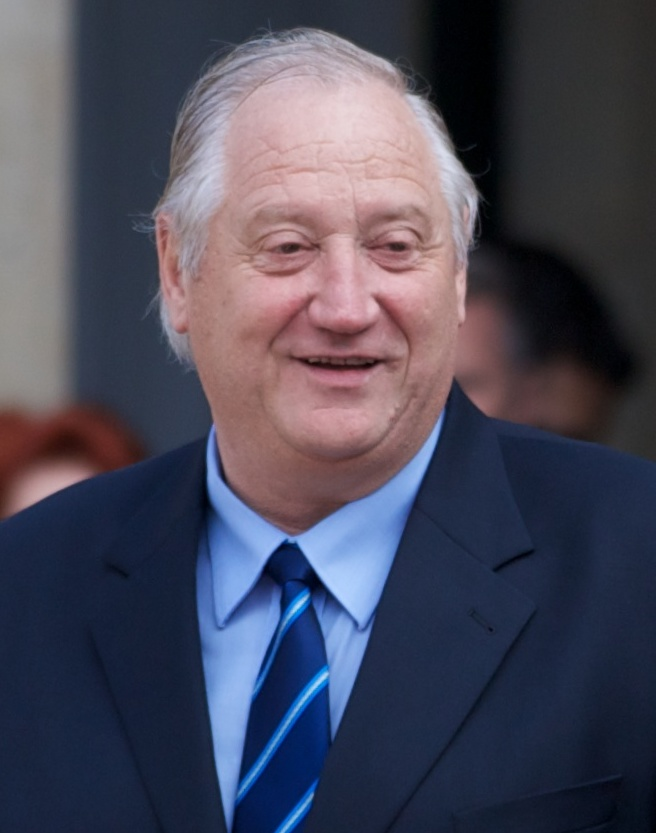
- Jean-Pierre Balligand at the 2012 inauguration ceremony of the President of France, Élysée Palace, Paris.

Member of the National Assembly of France for Aisne's 3rd constituency
- In office 1981–2012
- Preceded by: Maurice Brugnon
- Succeeded by: Jean-Louis Bricout

Mayor of Vervins
- Incumbent
- Assumed office 14 March 1983

Member of the General Council of Aisne
- Incumbent
- Assumed office 19 March 1979

Personal details
- Born: 30 May 1950 (age 75) La Neuville-lès-Dorengt, Aisne, France
- Party: PS
- Other political affiliations: SRC (National Assembly group)
- Committees: Finance, General Economy and Planning Committee

Jean-Pierre Balligand (French pronunciation: [ʒɑ̃ pjɛʁ baliɡɑ̃]; born 30 May 1950) was a member of the National Assembly of France, representing the 3rd constituency of the Aisne department from 1981 to 2012. He is a member of the Socialist Party (Parti Socialiste) and worked in association with the SRC parliamentary group.

== Biography ==
Jean-Pierre Balligand was mayor of Vervins (Aisne) from 1983 to 2013.

He was elected representative of the Aisne department without interruption between June 21, 1981 (7th legislature of the Fifth Republic) and June 19, 2012 (13th legislature of the Fifth Republic). He was Secretary of the National Assembly from April 4, 1986, to April 1, 1987, and from October 3, 2011, to June 20, 2012. He was Vice-President of the Assembly between October 6, 2010, and October 3, 2011, succeeding Danielle Bousquet.

He was chairman of the supervisory board of the Caisse des Dépôts et Consignations from 1997 to 2002. In 1998, he became president of the Aisne General Council after the left won the 1998 French cantonal elections.

On June 16, 2002, he was re-elected representative of the 3rd district of Aisne, defeating Annick Garin, then mayor (UMP) of Puisieux-et-Clanlieu, with 60.56% of the vote in the second round. On June 17, 2007, he was re-elected deputy, defeating Frédéric Meura, UMP mayor of Papleux, with 53.63% of the vote in the second round. He is a member of the Socialist, Radical and Citizen Group of the National Assembly (France). He did not stand for re-election in the 2012 legislative elections.
