= Paul Mougenot =

French politician (born 1988)

- Mougenot in 2025

Member of the Senate
- Incumbent
- Assumed office 1 October 2026
- Constituency: Aisne

Personal details
- Born: 13 October 1988 (age 38)
- Party: Independent
- Other political affiliations: Miscellaneous right

Paul Mougenot (French: [pɔl muʒəno]; born 13 October 1988) is a French politician who was elected member of the Senate in 2026. He has served as mayor of Aguilcourt since 2026, and has been a member of the Departmental Council of Aisne since 2021. In the 2022 legislative election, he was a candidate for the National Assembly in Aisne's 1st constituency.

Paul Mougenot wrote in 2025 a biography of Paul Doumer, the former president of the French Republic, with a foreword by Gérard Larcher, President of the French Senate.
