= Marc Delatte =

French politician

Deputy for Aisne's 4th constituency in the 15th legislature of the French Fifth Republic
- In office 21 June 2017 – 21 June 2022
- Preceded by: Marie-Françoise Bechtel
- Succeeded by: José Beaurain
- Parliamentary group: LREM

Personal details
- Born: 24 May 1961 (age 65) Soissons

Marc Delatte is a French politician of La République En Marche! (LREM) who represented the 4th constituency of the department of Aisne in the French National Assembly from 2017 to 2022.

== Political career ==
In parliament, Delatte served as member of the Committee on Social Affairs. In addition to his committee assignments, he was a member of the French-Australian Parliamentary Friendship Group and the French-German Parliamentary Friendship Group. From 2019, he was also a member of the French delegation to the Franco-German Parliamentary Assembly.

== Political positions ==
In July 2019, Delatte voted in favor of the French ratification of the European Union’s Comprehensive Economic and Trade Agreement (CETA) with Canada.

== See also ==
- 2017 French legislative election
