= René Dosière =

French politician

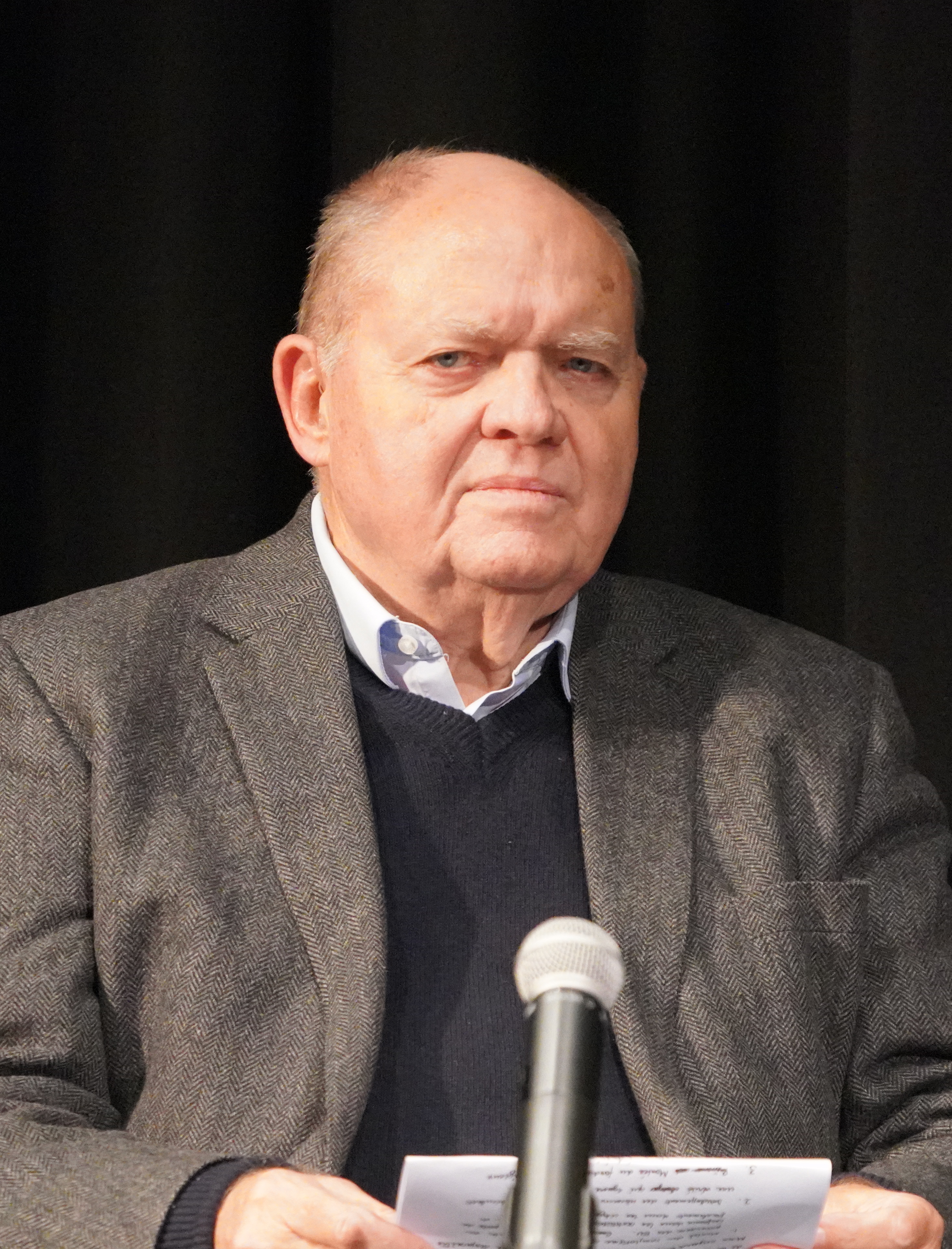
- René Dosière in 2023

Member of the National Assembly for Aisne's 1st constituency
- In office 12 June 1997 – 20 June 2017
- Preceded by: Jean-Claude Lamant
- Succeeded by: Aude Bono
- In office 13 June 1988 – 2 April 1993
- Preceded by: Proportional representation
- Succeeded by: Jean-Claude Lamant

Personal details
- Born: 3 August 1941 (age 85) Origny-Sainte-Benoite, France
- Party: Socialist Party
- Education: Panthéon-Sorbonne University

René Dosière (born 3 August 1941) is a retired French politician and activist who served as a member of the National Assembly from 1988 to 1993 and again from 1997 until 2017. He represented the 1st constituency of the Aisne department, and was a member of the Socialiste, radical, citoyen et divers gauche group. He was a member of the national bureau of the Jeunesse Etudiante Chrétienne between 1961 and 1962, in charge of high schools.

Born in Origny-Sainte-Benoite, Dosière is best known for his many questions to the government regarding the expenses of the services of the French presidency.
