= Aisne's 4th constituency =

Constituency of the National Assembly of France

4th constituency of the Aisne
- inline Constituency of the National Assembly of France

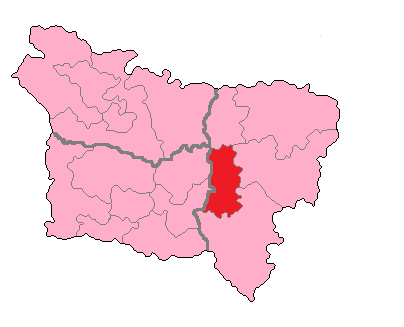
- Aisne's 4th constituency shown within Picardie
- Deputy: José Beaurain; RN
- Department: Aisne
- Cantons: Chauny, Coucy-le-Château-Auffrique, Soissons Nord, Soissons Sud, Tergnier, Vic-sur-Aisne
- Registered voters: 78,988

The 4th constituency of the Aisne is a French legislative constituency in the Aisne département.

== Description ==
Aisne's 4th constituency covers the territory around Soissons in the west of the department.

In common with other seats in Aisne the 4th constituency switched from the Gaullist to the Communists in the 1970s and maintained a preference for the left between then and 2017.

== Historic representation ==
Election	Member	Party
1958	Albert Catalifaud	UNR
1962	Albert Catalifaud	UNR
1967	Albert Catalifaud	UDR
1968	Albert Catalifaud	UDR
1973	Roland Renard	PCF
1978	Roland Renard	PCF
1981	Roland Renard	PCF
1986	Proportional representation - no election by constituency	
1988	Bernard Lefranc	PS
1993	Emmanuelle Bouquillon	UDF
1997	Jacques Desallangre	MDC
2002	Jacques Desallangre	MDC
2007	Jacques Desallangre	FG
2012	Marie-Françoise Bechtel	MRC
2017	Marc Delatte	LREM
2022	José Beaurain	RN
2024	José Beaurain	RN

== Election results ==
=== 2024 ===
Candidate	Party	Alliance	First round		Second round	
Candidate	Party	Alliance	Votes	%	Votes	%
José Beaurain	NR		25,913	55.04		
Benjamin Maurice	Renaissance (French political party)	Ensemble	10,448	22.19		
Lola Prié	PS	NFP	9,335	19.83		
Flora Bouilaguet	LO		832	1.77		
Philippe Goujard	DVC		553	1.17		
Valid votes			47,081	97.13		
Blank votes			992	2.05		
Null votes			400	0.83		
Turnout			48,473	61.41		
Abstentions			30,463	38.59		
Registered voters			78,936			
Result			NR HOLD			

=== 2022 ===
Legislative Election 2022: Aisne's 4th constituency
Party	Candidate	Votes	%	±%
RN	José Beaurain	11,973	35.72	+12.50
LREM (Ensemble)	Marc Delatte	7,632	22.77	-5.30
PCF (NUPÉS)	Aurélien Gall	7,461	22.26	+6.55
LR (UDC)	David Bobin	4,300	12.83	−7.37
REC	Vanessa Vicente	810	2.42	N/A
DLF (UPF)	Damien Créon	689	2.06	N/A
LO	Flora Bouillaguet	652	1.95	+0.61
Turnout		33,517	43.49	−1.05
2nd round result
RN	José Beaurain	17,587	57.15	+13.42
LREM (Ensemble)	Marc Delatte	13,187	42.85	−13.42
Turnout		30,774	42.31	+1.82
RN gain from LREM				

=== 2017 ===
Candidate	Label	First round		Second round	
Candidate	Label	Votes	%	Votes	%
Marc Delatte	REM	9,683	28.07	16,256	56.27
Jean Messiha	FN	8,010	23.22	12,631	43.73
Isabelle Létrillart	LR	6,969	20.20		
Sylvie Heyvaerts	FI	2,995	8.68		
Marie-Françoise Bechtel	DVG	2,747	7.96		
Michel Carreau	PCF	2,427	7.03		
Francis Meuley	ECO	611	1.77		
Jean-Pierre Vitu	EXG	463	1.34		
Caroline Mariotti	EXD	327	0.95		
Natacha Roselet	DIV	268	0.78		
Votes		34,500	100.00	28,887	100.00
Valid votes		34,500	97.91	28,887	90.18
Blank votes		530	1.50	2,192	6.84
Null votes		208	0.59	952	2.97
Turnout		35,238	44.54	32,031	40.49
Abstentions		43,878	55.46	47,083	59.51
Registered voters		79,116		79,114	
Source: Ministry of the Interior

=== 2012 ===
Summary of the 10 June and 17 June 2012 French legislative in Aisne's 4th Constituency election results
Candidate	Party		1st round		2nd round	
Candidate	Party		Votes	%	Votes	%
Marie-Françoise Bechtel	Citizen and Republican Movement	MRC	10,073	23.37%	21,875	53.62%
Isabelle Letrillart	Union for a Popular Movement	UMP	10,476	24.31%	18,924	46.38%
Evelyne Ruelle	National Front	FN	8,062	18.70%		
Jean-Luc Lanouilh	Left Front	FG	7,460	17.31%		
Frédéric Alliot		RDG	4,096	9.50%		
Charles-Edouard Lauriston	Radical Party	PRV	891	2.07%		
Stéphanie Lebee	The Greens	VEC	727	%		
Martine Lehideux	Far Right	EXD	412	0.96%		
Michelle Sapori	Miscellaneous Right	DVD	353	0.82%		
Laetitia Voisin	Far Left	EXG	282	0.65%		
Barbara Knockaert	Far Left	EXG	269	0.62%		
Total			43,101	100%	40,799	100%
Registered voters			78,987		78,988	
Blank/Void ballots			611	1.40%	1,593	3.76%
Turnout			43,712	55.34%	42,392	53.67%
Abstentions			35,275	44.66%	36,596	46.33%
Result					MRC GAIN	

=== 2007 ===
Summary of the 10 June and 17 June 2007 French legislative in Aisne's 4th Constituency election results
Candidate	Party		1st round		2nd round	
Candidate	Party		Votes	%	Votes	%
Jacques Desallangre	Miscellaneous Left	DVG	11,802	26.17%	24,792	54.58%
Brigitte Thuin-Macherez	Union for a Popular Movement	UMP	14,481	32.12%	20,633	45.42%
Claire le Flecher	Socialist Party	PS	7,322	16.24%		
Wallerand de Saint-Just	National Front	FN	3,726	8.26%		
Isabelle Letrillart	Movement for France	MPF	2,303	5.11%		
Yannick Sable	Democratic Movement	MoDem	1,949	4.32%		
Dominique Natanson	Far Left	EXG	1,009	2.24%		
Vincent Bocquet	The Greens	VEC	869	1.92%		
Laetitia Voisin	Far Left	EXG	657	1.46%		
Henri Lienaux	Hunting, Fishing, Nature, Traditions	CPNT	569	1.26%		
Philippe Enguehard	Divers	DIV	380	0.84%		
Houssens Besbas	Divers	DIV	22	0.05%		
Total			45,089	100%	45,425	100%
Registered voters			79,255		79,252	
Blank/Void ballots			740	1.61%	1,144	2.46%
Turnout			45,829	57.82%	46,569	58.76%
Abstentions			33,426	42.18%	32,683	41.24%
Result					DVG HOLD	

== Sources ==
- Official results of French elections from 1998: "Résultats électoraux officiels en France" (in French). Archived from the original on 20 December 2011.
