= Jocelyn Dessigny =

French politician

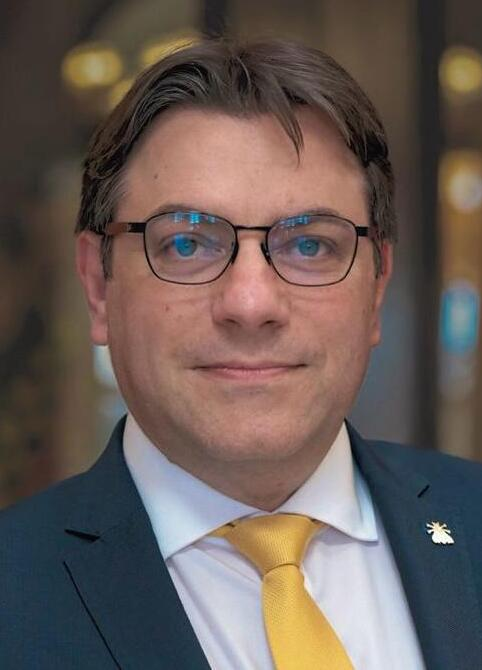

Member of the National Assembly for Aisne's 5th constituency
- Incumbent
- Assumed office 22 June 2022
- Preceded by: Jacques Krabal

Personal details
- Born: 29 June 1981 (age 45) France
- Party: National Rally

Jocelyn Dessigny (29 June 1981) is a French politician from National Rally (RN) who has represented the 5th constituency of Aisne in the National Assembly since 2022.

Dessigny holds a Brevet de technicien supérieur qualification in sales and worked as a recruitment consultant. He currently owns and manages a recruitment agency in Soissons. He joined the National Front (now National Rally) in 2001 and was an activist and local secretary of its youth wing Génération Nation in Soissons. He was elected municipal councilor of Villers-Cotterêts in 2014 and appointed deputy mayor in 2020. In 2022, he was elected as a deputy for Aisne's 5th constituency during the legislative elections of that year.
