= Nicolas Dragon =

French politician (born 1977)

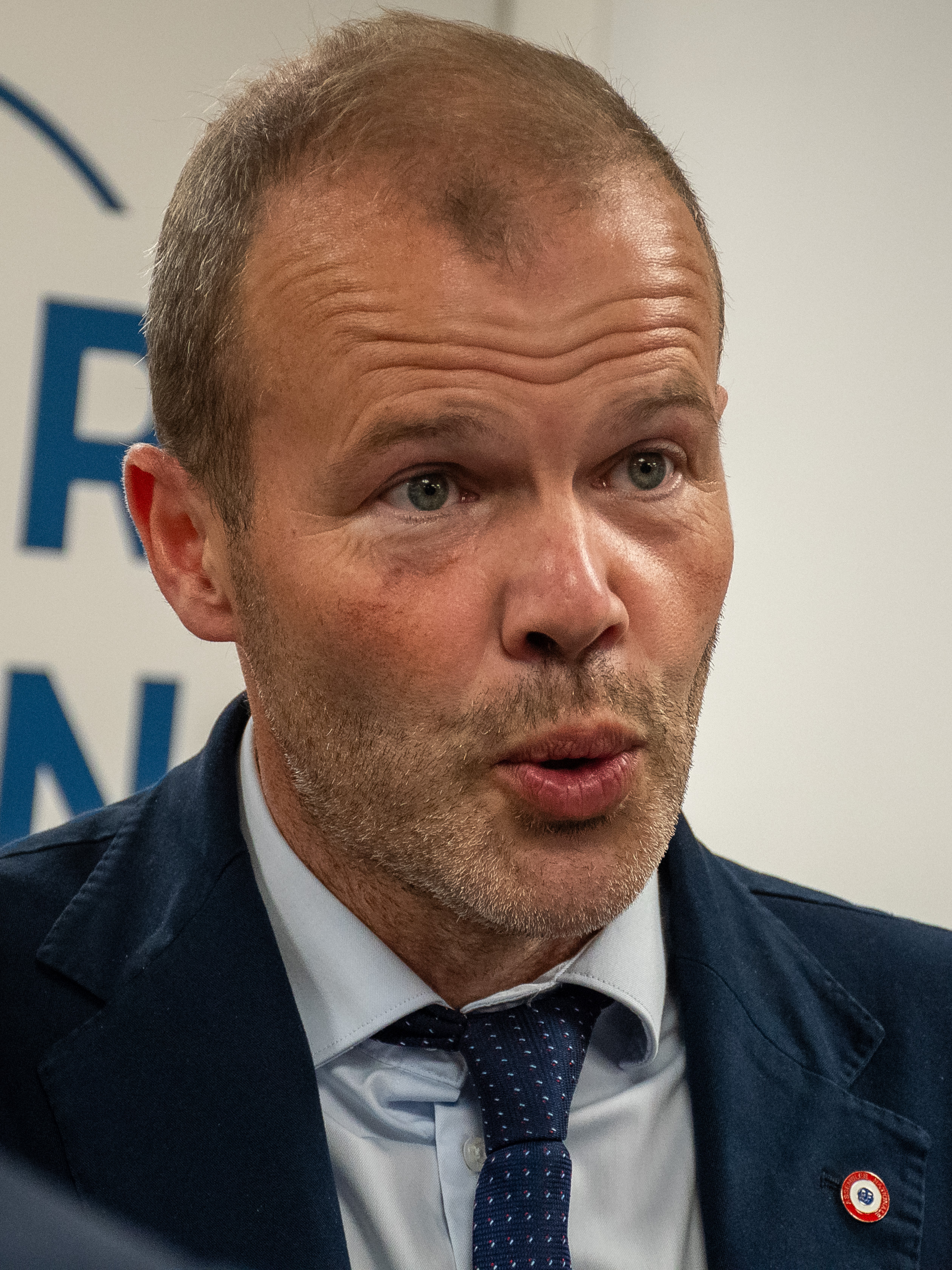

Member of the National Assembly for Aisne's 1st constituency
- Incumbent
- Assumed office 22 June 2022
- Preceded by: Aude Bono-Vandorme

Personal details
- Born: 19 April 1977 (age 48) Laon, France
- Party: National Rally (2020–present)
- Other political affiliations: Rally for the Republic (1994–2002); Union for a Popular Movement (2002–2012); La République En Marche! (2017–2020)

Nicolas Dragon (French pronunciation: [nikɔla dʁaɡɔ̃]; born 19 April 1977) is a French politician who has represented the 1st constituency of Aisne in the National Assembly since 2022. A member of the National Rally (RN), he has also been a municipal councillor of Laon since 2020, previously holding a seat from 1995 to 2001 as a member of the Rally for the Republic (RPR).

== Career ==
A native of Laon, Dragon is of Polish descent. He worked as a communications consultant. He stated he took an interest in politics at a young age, describing himself as a "social Gaullist" and supporting the Rally for the Republic in the 1990s, as well as its successor the Union for a Popular Movement in the 2000s. He served one term in the municipal council of Laon from 1995 to 2001.

He sought the En Marche! (later La République En Marche!) nomination for the 1st constituency of Aisne ahead of the 2017 legislative election, claiming he initially agreed with Emmanuel Macron's "concept of neither left nor right", but lost out to Aude Bono-Vandorme. He later renounced his support for Macron, whom he described as a "globalist". He subsequently joined the National Rally and was elected again a municipal councillor in Laon in 2020.

For the 2022 legislative election, Dragon contested Aisne's 1st constituency for the National Rally, when he defeated Bono-Vandorme in the second round with 54.5% of the vote. He was reelected at the 2024 snap election, winning an absolute majority of the vote (57%) in the first round.
