= José Beaurain =

French politician (born 1971)

Member of the National Assembly for Aisne's 4th constituency
- Incumbent
- Assumed office June 2022
- Preceded by: Marc Delatte

Municipal councillor of Chauny
- Incumbent
- Assumed office 2020

Personal details
- Born: 27 July 1971 (age 55)
- Party: National Rally

José Beaurain (French pronunciation: [ʒoze boʁɛ̃]; born 27 July 1971) is a French politician of the National Rally (RN) and disability rights campaigner. He has been Member of the National Assembly for Aisne's 4th constituency following the 2022 French legislative election. Beaurain was the first blind person elected as a deputy of the French Fifth Republic.

== Biography ==
Beaurain is a piano tuner by profession and also practices bodybuilding. He won several local bodybuilding contests and was president of a sports union for disabled people in France. Beaurain was born visually impaired due to congenital glaucoma and completely lost his sight in 2008. He has focused on issues faced by people with disabilities during his political career.

Beaurain joined the RN in the 2010s. In 2014, he was elected as a municipal councilor for the party in Chauny. During the 2022 French elections to the National Assembly, Beaurain contested the seat of Asine's 4th constituency and defeated En Marche incumbent deputy Marc Delatte during the second round.

== See also ==
- List of deputies of the 16th National Assembly of France
