= Daniel L. Gard =

United States Navy rear admiral

The Reverend Daniel Lee Gard PhD

11th President of Concordia University Chicago
- In office 2014–2019
- Preceded by: John F. Johnson
- Succeeded by: Russell P. Dawn

18th Deputy Chief of Chaplains for Reserve Matters
- In office October 2013 – October 2016
- Preceded by: Gregory C. Horn

Personal details
- Born: Daniel Lee Gard; January 29, 1954 (age 72)
- Spouse: Annette K. (Scheumann) Gard
- Children: Rachel Gard, Hannah Gard, Caleb Gard
- Education: Carthage College; Concordia Theological Seminary; University of Notre Dame
- Awards: Legion of Merit: Defense Meritorious Service Medal; Meritorious Service Medal; Navy and Marine Corps Commendation Medal; Navy and Marine Corps Achievement Medal
- Nickname: Dan

Military service
- Allegiance: United States
- Branch/service: United States Navy
- Years of service: 1988–2016
- Rank: Rear Admiral

Daniel L. Gard is a retired rear admiral in the United States Navy Reserve and was Deputy Chief of Chaplains for Reserve Matters of the United States Navy Chaplain Corps. He was also the president of Concordia University Chicago.

== Civilian career ==
Gard was the 11th president of Concordia University Chicago, retiring in 2019. He was a member of the faculty of Concordia Theological Seminary from 1989 to 2014, and again since 2019. Previously, he served as a Lutheran pastor in Mishawaka, Indiana.

He is a graduate of Carthage College, Concordia Theological Seminary, and the University of Notre Dame.

== Military career ==
Gard was commissioned a lieutenant (junior grade) in the Navy Reserve in 1988. His assignments include being stationed at Naval Air Station Sigonella, Deputy Force Chaplain and Deputy Director of Operations Ministry of the United States Atlantic Fleet, Deputy Force Chaplain of the United States Marine Corps Reserve and Deputy Chaplain of the United States Marine Corps for Reserve Matters.

Following the September 11 attacks, Gard took part in the recovery operations of The Pentagon. He was later deployed to serve in the Iraq War and as Deputy Force Chaplain for Marine Forces Reserve before serving as Joint Task Force Chaplain of Joint Task Force Guantanamo. In 2013, he served as Deputy Chaplain of the Marine Corps for Reserve Matters. Gard assumed his duties as Rear Admiral and Deputy Chief of Chaplains for Reserve Matters in 2013 and retired in 2016.

Awards he has received include the Legion of Merit, Defense Meritorious Service Medal, the Meritorious Service Medal, the Navy and Marine Corps Commendation Medal and the Navy and Marine Corps Achievement Medal.
