= Didier Guillaume =

French politician (1959–2025)

His Excellency Didier Guillaume
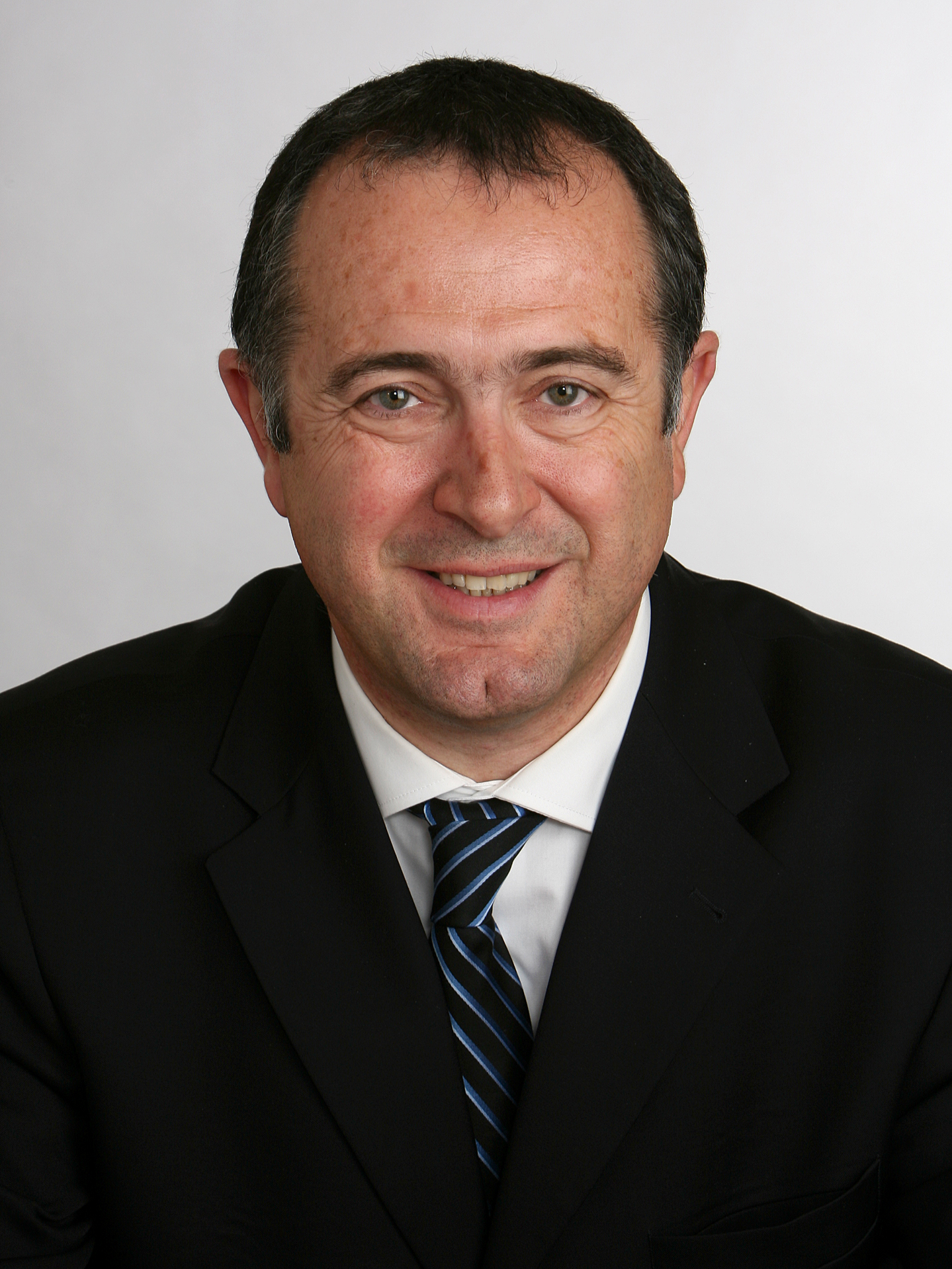
- Guillaume in 2008

25th Minister of State of Monaco
- In office 2 September 2024 – 17 January 2025; On leave: 10 January 2025 – 17 January 2025
- Monarch: Albert II
- Preceded by: Pierre Dartout
- Succeeded by: Isabelle Berro-Amadeï (acting)

Minister of Agriculture and Food
- In office 16 October 2018 – 6 July 2020
- Prime Minister: Édouard Philippe
- Preceded by: Stéphane Travert
- Succeeded by: Julien Denormandie

President of the Socialist group in the Senate
- In office 15 April 2014 – 22 January 2018
- Preceded by: François Rebsamen
- Succeeded by: Patrick Kanner

Senator for Drôme
- In office 1 October 2008 – 16 November 2018

President of the General Council of Drôme
- In office 1 April 2004 – 2 April 2015
- Preceded by: Jean Mouton
- Succeeded by: Patrick Labaune

Mayor of Bourg-de-Péage
- In office 19 June 1995 – 1 April 2004
- Preceded by: Henri Durand
- Succeeded by: Jean-Félix Pupel

Personal details
- Born: 11 May 1959 Bourg-de-Péage, France
- Died: 17 January 2025 (aged 65) Nice, France
- Party: Independent
- Other political affiliations: Socialist Party (until 2018)
- Spouse: Béatrice Frecenon (m. 2024)

Didier Guillaume (French: [didje ɡijom]; 11 May 1959 – 17 January 2025) was a French politician who briefly served as minister of state of Monaco from 2024 until his death in 2025. He previously served as the minister of agriculture and food in the government of Prime Minister Édouard Philippe from 2018 to 2020. A member of the Socialist Party until 2018, he was President of the General Council of Drôme from 2004 to 2015, Senator for Drôme from 2008 to 2018 and president of the Socialist group in the Senate from 2014 to 2018.

== Political career ==
=== Early beginnings ===
In 2004, after he was elected President of the General Council of Drôme, Guillaume resigned his post as Mayor of Bourg-de-Péage, which he had held since the 1995 municipal election. The town is the chef-lieu of the canton of Bourg-de-Péage, represented by Guillaume in the Drôme General Council from 1998 until 2015.

=== Senator for Drôme (2008–2018) ===
In 2008, Guillaume was elected to the Senate. He served as First Vice President of the Senate under the leadership of President Jean-Pierre Bel from 2011 to 2014, when he became president of the Socialist group and Leader of the Opposition in the Senate, as the right had won a majority at the 2014 election.

After leaving the presidency of the Drôme General Council following the victory of The Republicans at the 2015 departmental election, he was succeeded by Patrick Kanner as group president in the Senate in 2018. Guillaume also worked as Manuel Valls's campaign director in the Socialist Party's primaries for the 2017 presidential election.

=== Minister of Agriculture (2018–2020) ===
Guillaume served as Minister of Agriculture and Food under Prime Minister Édouard Philippe from 2018 to 2020, succeeding Stéphane Travert. After taking office, he vowed to take his decisions "in independence" from the industry lobbies.

Guillaume stated he would run for Mayor of Biarritz in 2020 against fellow government member Jean-Baptiste Lemoyne, but they both withdrew their candidacies before the election.

During the COVID-19 pandemic, Gulliaume called on unemployed citizens to help the country's farmers in their production process as seasonal foreign workers were absent. 50,000 people responded favourably. He was succeeded by Julien Denormandie and retired from politics.

=== Minister of State of Monaco (2024–2025) ===
Didier Guillaume was announced as the forthcoming Minister of State of Monaco on 10 June 2024, to succeed the incumbent Pierre Dartout for a four-year term beginning on 2 September.

== Personal life and death ==
Guillaume was born in Drôme, to a sheep farmer.

Guillaume was married to Béatrice Frecenon-Guillaume, whom he wed at Monaco Town Hall on 21 December 2024.

Didier Guillaume died in Nice on 17 January 2025, at the age of 65 after having been hospitalised for an illness on 10 January. He was given a state funeral at Monaco Cathedral on 23 January that was attended by both Prince Albert II and French President Emmanuel Macron.

== Sources ==
- Page on the Senate website

Political offices
Preceded by Pierre Dartout	Prime Minister of Monaco; 2024–2025	Succeeded by Isabelle Berro-Amadeï; Acting
