= List of senators for Ariège =

This is a list of the senators who have represented the department of Ariège. The department had two seats under the Third Republic and only one since the Fourth Republic. The current President of the Senate, Jean-Pierre Bel, is also senator of Ariège since 1998.

== Historic list ==
=== Third Republic ===
#	Senator	Political group	Years		Term	Electoral history	#	Senator	Political group	Years		Term	Electoral history
	Georges Reynald	Republican Union	January 7, 1912	January 13, 1930	2	Elected in 1912; Re-elected in 1921		Henri Bernère	Democratic Left	January 7, 1912	February 5, 1914	1/2	Elected in 1912
	Georges Reynald	Republican Union	January 7, 1912	January 13, 1930	2	Elected in 1912; Re-elected in 1921		Eugène Peres	Democratic Left	March 29, 1914	January 13, 1930	2	Elected in 1914; Re-elected in 1921
	Paul Laffont	Democratic Left	January 14, 1930	July 13, 1944	1 1/2	Elected in 1930; Re-elected in 1939		Joseph Rambaud	Democratic Left	Janvier 14, 1930	October 3, 1944	1 1/2	Elected in 1930; Re-elected in 1939

=== Fourth Republic ===
#	Senator	Political group	Years		Term	Electoral history
1	Aimé Molinié	Communist	December 8, 1946	November 7, 1948	1	Elected in 1946; Defeated in 1948
2	Henri Assaillit	Socialist	November 7, 1948	June 18, 1955	1	Elected in 1948; Defeated in 1955
3	Jean Nayrou	Socialist	June 18, 1955	April 26, 1959	1	Elected in 1955

=== Fifth Republic ===
#	Senator	Political group	Years		Term	Electoral history
1	Jean Nayrou	Socialist	April 26, 1959	October 1, 1980	3	Elected in 1959; Re-elected in 1962; Re-elected in 1971
2	Germain Authié	Socialist	October 1, 1980	September 30, 1998	2	Elected in 1980; Re-elected in 1989
3	Jean-Pierre Bel	Socialist	September 30, 1998	September 30, 2014	2	Elected in 1998; Re-elected in 2008 Alain Duran
4	Alain Duran	Socialist	September 30, 2014	Incumbent	1	Elected in 2014
