= Jean-Claude Gaudin =

French politician (1939–2024)

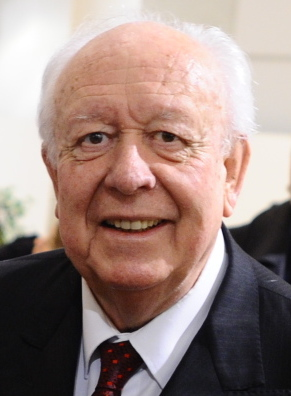
- Gaudin in 2011

Vice President of the French Senate
- In office 8 October 2014 – 22 September 2017
- President: Gérard Larcher
- Succeeded by: Valérie Létard
- In office 6 October 1998 – 28 March 2011
- President: Christian Poncelet; Gérard Larcher

Leader of Union for a Popular Movement in the Senate
- In office 8 March 2011 – 1 October 2014
- Preceded by: Gérard Longuet
- Succeeded by: Bruno Retailleau

Senator of Bouches-du-Rhône
- In office 1 October 1998 – 22 September 2017
- Succeeded by: Anne-Marie Bertrand

Mayor of Marseille
- In office 25 June 1995 – 4 July 2020
- Preceded by: Robert Vigouroux
- Succeeded by: Michèle Rubirola

Minister of the City
- In office 7 November 1995 – 2 June 1997
- President: Jacques Chirac
- Prime Minister: Alain Juppé
- Preceded by: Bernard Pons
- Succeeded by: Dominique Voynet

Personal details
- Born: 8 October 1939 Marseille, France
- Died: 20 May 2024 (aged 84) Saint-Zacharie, France
- Party: The Republicans (2015–2024)
- Other political affiliations: National Centre of Independents and Peasants (1965–1973); Independent Republicans (1973–1977); Republican Party (1977–1997); Union for French Democracy (1997–2002); Union for a Popular Movement (2002–2015)

Jean-Claude Gaudin (French pronunciation: [ʒɑ̃ klod ɡodɛ̃]; 8 October 1939 – 20 May 2024) was a French politician for The Republicans. He served as the Mayor of Marseille from 1995 to 2020.

Gaudin was a member of the National Assembly of France from Bouches-du-Rhône from 1978 to 1989 and was a member of the French Senate from 1989 to 1995 and again from 1998. From 1995 to 1997, he served as Minister of Territorial Development in Alain Juppé's Second Cabinet.

Gaudin served as vice-president of the Senate from 1998 to 2011; as vice-president of UMP 2002–2007 and as one of several vice-presidents for UMP 2013–2014.

== Biography ==
=== Early life ===
Jean-Claude Gaudin was born on 8 October 1939 in Mazargues, a neighbourhood of the 9th arrondissement in Marseille, Bouches-du-Rhône, France. His ancestors had lived in Mazargues since 1600. His father was a mason and his mother was an espadrille-maker. They entertained author and playwright Marcel Pagnol (1895–1974), actress Alida Rouffe (1874–1939), and actor Raimu (1883–1946). They also had a small house at the Calanque de Sormiou, where they spent their summers.

In 1965, he was enrolled in military service where he served briefly. Upon graduation from university, he became a teacher of history and geography for fifteen years at the Lycée Saint-Joseph in Marseille. He was elected on the list of centrist and socialist politicians led by Gaston Defferre against the Gaullist party Union for the New Republic (UNR). He was subsequently elected in a local election and became one of the youngest members on the Marseille city council. He was re-elected again in 1971.

=== National Assembly ===
In 1974, he took part in the presidential campaign of Valéry Giscard d'Estaing. In 1978, he won his first election for the National Assembly as the candidate in the 2nd district of the Rhône delta. He beat the outgoing socialist deputy, Charles-Émile Loo, with 53.7% of the votes cast. In June 1981, he won reelection. He then became president of the Union for French Democracy (UDF) group in the National Assembly.

In 1986, he was given the responsibility for the executive of Provence-Alpes-Côte d'Azur. On 25 April 1986, he became president of the first regional council of Provence-Alpes-Côte d'Azur elected by direct vote. In 1988, after the dissolution of the National Assembly, he was again re-elected, for the fourth time, deputy of the Rhône delta for 2nd district of Marseille, with 60.63% of the votes cast. His presidency of the UDF Group in the National Assembly was also renewed.

=== Senate, Mayor of Marseille and Minister ===
In September 1989, he was a candidate for the senatorial elections and won the district. In 1992, Gaudin carried the vote again, beating Bernard Tapie and Jean-Marie Le Pen. He was also re-elected president of the regional council of Provence-Alpes-Côte-d'Azur on 27 March 1992.

In 1983, Gaudin tried to unseat Gaston Defferre as Mayor of Marseille, and lost by a handful of votes. In 1989, he was expected to win against Defferre's successor Robert Vigouroux, but lost again. In 1995, Gaudin stood for the post of Mayor along with maintaining his position as a senator. He won with an absolute majority of 55 City councilmen out of 101 and was installed as Mayor of Marseille on 25 June 1995.

From June 1995 to September 1996, Gaudin was president of football club Olympique de Marseille. The club had recently filed for bankruptcy in the aftershocks of the French football bribery scandal.

On 7 November 1995, on a proposal from Alain Juppé, President Jacques Chirac named Jean-Claude Gaudin Minister for Integration and City and Regional Planning.

On 6 October 1998, he became vice-president of the Senate. He was re-elected Mayor of Marseille again on 25 March 2001 as well as 16 March 2008, and president of the Urban Community of Marseille Provence Métropole on 11 April. On 3 October 2001, Jean-Claude Gaudin was re-elected as vice-president of the Senate for a second time. In 2004, he was re-elected for a third time as vice-president of the Senate.

In 2004, Gaudin was interim president of the UMP after Alain Juppé stepped down and before Nicolas Sarkozy was elected. He was interim president again in 2007 after Nicolas Sarkozy stepped down, alongside Pierre Méhaignerie and Brice Hortefeux.

In 2013, he announced he would run for Mayor a fourth time. In the first round of the election, he obtained 37.64% of the votes. In the second round he garnered 42.39% while the Socialist candidate got 31,09 and Front National's candidate 26,51. On 4 April, the municipal council in Marseille elected him as mayor for a new period with no opposing candidate.

In June 2017, he announced that he would not be seeking another term in the 2020 municipal elections. He held his last municipal council—the 198th— on 27 January 2020 and supported the candidacy of Martine Vassal against Bruno Gilles to succeed to him. In May 2020, during the COVID-19 pandemic, Gaudin announced ordering 1.5 million face masks for residents of Marseille, and advocated a policy of voluntary screening.

The left-wing candidate Michèle Rubirola was elected by the municipal council to succeed to him on 4 July 2020. Soon after, he was named by the new mayor as head of the ecumenical association Marseille Espérance, founded in 1990 by his predecessor Robert Vigouroux.

=== No-show jobs scandal ===
A few months after Gaudin stepped down as mayor, a preliminary hearing related to supposed no-show jobs at the Marseille City Hall, started after a system of false recordkeeping of SAMU Social employees' attendance was revealed, and led the National Financial Prosecutor's Office (PNF) to send him, with six of his relatives, before the tribunal correctionnel. The conclusions of the PNF call out his management of human resources by pointing out undue overtime, as well as unjustified absenteeism in the SAMU Social and in the museums and libraries of the city. During the hearings, Gaudin regularly justified himself by mentioning a "social peace" and the fear of trade union reactions.

The PNF pointed out several grievances, including the "lack of control of work efficiency", the "flat rate of overtime", or "the payment of unworked overtime", in numerous services including the SAMU Social, Allô mairie, museums, a city garage, etc. More than 800 agents were claimed to have benefited from these irregularities, with a cost for the city reaching one million euros per year. Jean-Claude Gaudin and four of his associates ended up pleading guilty of "neglectful embezzlement" in a plea bargain procedure. The sentence suggested by the PNF was negotiated on 22 March before being approved by the judge. Gaudin was sentenced to a €10,000 fine and a six-month suspended prison sentence in March 2022.

=== Honours ===
On 11 July 1997, Gaudin was made Knight of the Legion of Honour, with which he was formally decorated on 14 October. He was promoted to Officer on 14 July 2018.

On 26 September 2016, Gaudin was awarded the Plaque rank of the Order of the Aztec Eagle by the president of Mexico, Enrique Peña Nieto.

=== Personal life and death ===
Gaudin was a practising Catholic. He lived in a rented apartment in Neuilly-sur-Seine during the week and spent his weekends in a mansion in Saint-Zacharie.

Gaudin died at his residence in Saint-Zacharie on 20 May 2024, at the age of 84.

Political offices
Preceded by Robert Vigouroux	Mayor of Marseille; 1995–2020	Succeeded by Michèle Rubirola
Preceded by Gérard Longuet	Leader of Union for a Popular Movement Group in the Senate; 2011–2014	Succeeded by Bruno Retailleau
Preceded by Jean-Pierre Bel	Leader of the Opposition in the Senate; 2011–2014	Succeeded by Didier Guillaume
Party political offices
Preceded by Alain Juppé	President of the Union for a Popular Movement; Acting; 2004	Succeeded by Nicolas Sarkozy
Preceded by Nicolas Sarkozy	President of the Union for a Popular Movement; Acting; 2007	Succeeded by Patrick Devedjian, Jean-Pierre Raffarin, and Pierre Méhaignerie (Collegial direction)
