= Christian Poncelet =

French politician (1928–2020)

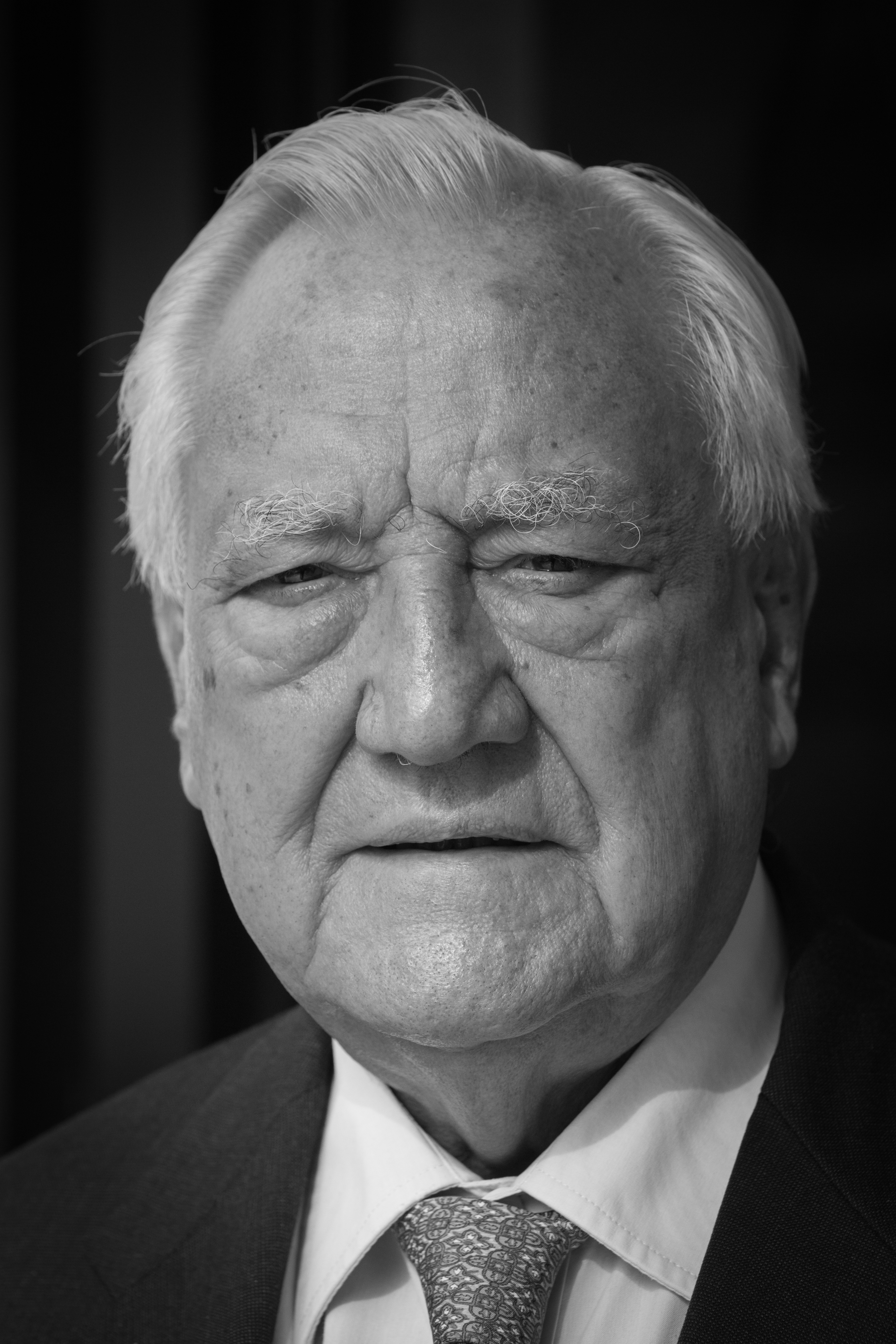
- Poncelet in 2013

President of the French Senate
- In office 2 October 1998 – 30 September 2008
- Preceded by: René Monory
- Succeeded by: Gérard Larcher

Personal details
- Born: 24 March 1928 Blaise, Ardennes
- Died: 11 September 2020 (aged 92) Remiremont, France
- Party: UMP
- Spouse: Yvette Miclot (m. 1949; died 2019)
- Children: 2

Christian Poncelet (French pronunciation: [kʁistjɑ̃ pɔ̃slɛ]; 24 March 1928 – 11 September 2020) was a conservative French politician. A member of President Nicolas Sarkozy's Union for a Popular Movement (UMP), he was President of the Senate from 1998 to 2008. In addition to being a Senator, he was Mayor of Remiremont (Vosges) and was also the President of the General Council of Vosges.

== Political career ==
He was elected to the National Assembly in the November 1962 parliamentary election from the Third Constituency of Vosges and was re-elected from the same constituency in the March 1967 parliamentary election and the June 1968 parliamentary election. He served as a deputy until August 1972, when he vacated his seat following his nomination as a member of the government. He was first elected to the Senate in September 1977, and he was re-elected in September 1986, September 1995, and September 2004, representing Vosges.

On 2 October 1998, Poncelet was elected by the Senate as its President in a third round of voting. The previous President of the Senate, René Monory, had withdrawn after the first round of voting. In the third round, Poncelet received 189 votes against 93 for Socialist candidate Claude Estier and one vote for the withdrawn Communist candidate Hélène Luc.

In 2000, Poncelet was awarded the Grand Cross of the Royal Norwegian Order of Merit.

Following the September 2008 Senate election, it was announced on 24 September that Poncelet would not seek another term as President of the Senate, although he would continue to serve as a Senator. He was succeeded by Gérard Larcher, also from the UMP, on 1 October.

== Personal life ==
Poncelet was born in Blaise (now part of Vouziers) in the Ardennes.

Poncelet died in Remiremont, on 11 September 2020, at the age of 92.

== Political career ==
Governmental functions

- Secretary of State for Social Affairs: 1972–1973
- Secretary of State for Employment and Population : 1973–1974
- Secretary of State for Public Service : March–May 1974
- Secretary of State for Budget : May 1974 – 1977
- Secretary of State for Parliamentary Relations : April–September 1977 (Became senator in 1977)

Electoral mandates

European Parliament

- Member of the European Parliament : 1979–1980 (resignation). Elected in 1979.

National Assembly

- Member of the National Assembly of France for Vosges : 1962–1972 (Became Secretary of State in 1972). Elected in 1962, re-elected in 1967, 1968, 1973, but he stayed Secretary of State.

Senate

- President of the Senate of France : 1998–2008. Elected in 1998, re-elected in 2001, 2004.
- Président of the Finance Commission of the Senate : 1986–1998.
- Senator of Vosges : 1977-2014. Elected in 1977, re-elected in 1986, 1995, 2004.

Regional Council

- Regional councillor of Lorraine : 1977–1992.

General Council

- President of the General Council of Vosges : 1976-2015. Re-elected in 1979, 1982, 1985, 1988, 1992, 1994, 1998, 2001, 2004, 2008, 2011.
- General councillor of Vosges : 1964-2015. Re-elected in 1970, 1976, 1982, 1988, 1994, 2001, 2008.

Municipal Council

- Mayor of Remiremont : 1983-2001. Re-elected in 1989, 1995.
- Deputy Mayor of Remiremont : 1971-1983. Re-elected in 1977.
- Municipal councillor of Remiremont : 1965–2001. Re-elected in 1971, 1977, 1983, 1989, 1995.

Political offices
Preceded by Henri Torre	Secretary of State for Budget; 1974–1977	Succeeded by Pierre Bernard-Reymond
Preceded by Robert Boulin	Secretary of State for Parliamentary Relations; 1977	Succeeded by André Bord
Preceded by René Monory	President of the French Senate; 1998–2008	Succeeded by Gérard Larcher
