= Robert Vigouroux =

French politician and author

Mayor of Marseille
- In office 17 May 1986 – 25 June 1995
- Preceded by: Gaston Defferre
- Succeeded by: Jean-Claude Gaudin

Senator of Bouches-du-Rhône
- In office 24 September 1989 – 30 September 1998

Personal details
- Born: Robert Paul Vigouroux; 21 March 1923 Paris, France
- Died: 9 July 2017 (aged 94) Gardanne, France
- Party: Socialist Party
- Education: Lycée Thiers
- Profession: Neurosurgeon

Robert Vigouroux (French pronunciation: [ʁɔbɛʁ viɡuʁu]; 21 March 1923 – 9 July 2017) was a French politician and writer. He was the Mayor of Marseille (the second largest city in France) from 1986 to 1995, and a French Senator for the Bouches-du-Rhône from 1989 to 1998.

== Biography ==
Robert Vigouroux was born in Paris. In 1942, he moved to Marseilles to work as a doctor in hospitals. He was elected as Mayor of Marseille in 1986, and as Senator in 1989. He later published two volumes of poetry under the pen name of Stépan Alexis, and later essays, novels, volumes of paintings and photographs in his real name.

== Bibliography ==
=== Poetry ===
- L’Explication
- Mémoires des temps passés

=== Essays ===
- Un parmi les autres
- Quelle est ta ville
- Et si je vous disais…

=== Novels ===
- La vie en morceaux
- Le docteur et ses jumeaux (2003)

=== Paintings ===
- Au fil du temps (2005)

=== Photographs ===
- Marseille-Moderne (co-editor, 2008)
