= René Monory =

French politician (1923–2009)

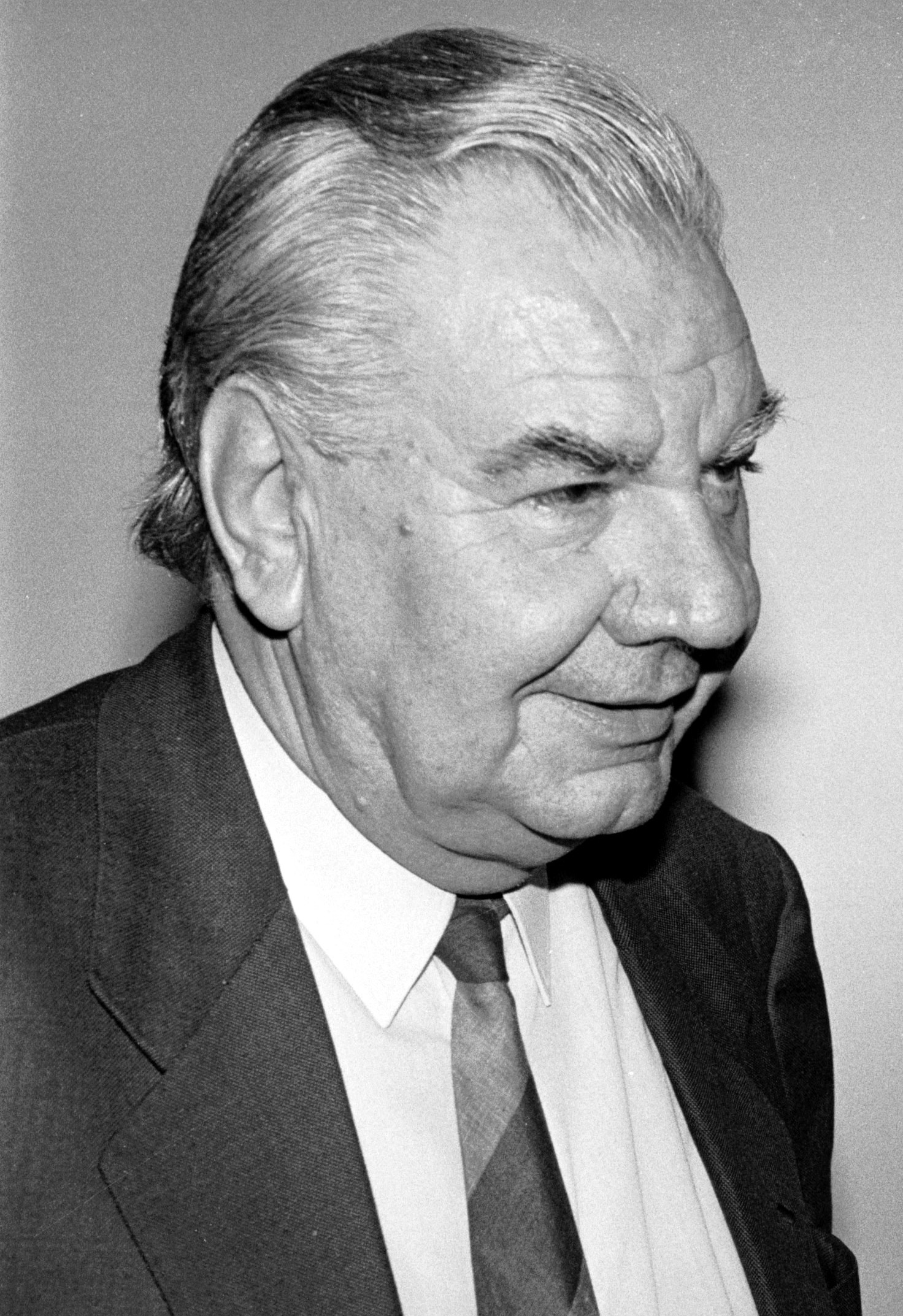
- Monory in 1986

President of the French Senate
- In office 2 October 1992 – 1 October 1998
- Preceded by: Alain Poher
- Succeeded by: Christian Poncelet

Minister of National Education
- In office 20 March 1986 – 10 May 1988
- President: François Mitterrand
- Prime Minister: Jacques Chirac
- Preceded by: Jean-Pierre Chevènement
- Succeeded by: Lionel Jospin

Minister of the Economy
- In office 31 March 1978 – 22 May 1981
- President: Valéry Giscard d'Estaing
- Prime Minister: Raymond Barre
- Preceded by: Raymond Barre
- Succeeded by: Jacques Delors

Personal details
- Born: 6 June 1923 Loudun, France
- Died: 11 April 2009 (aged 85) Loudun, France
- Party: UDF

René Monory (French: [ʁəne mɔnɔʁi]; 6 June 1923 – 11 April 2009) was a French centre-right Gaullist politician.

== Biography ==
René Monory was born in Loudun and began his career as the owner of a garage. He was the founder of the Poitiers Futuroscope.

Monory first became a Senator in 1968. A member of the Union for French Democracy (UDF), he was Minister of Economy and Finance (1978–1981) in the government of Raymond Barre. He was President of the Regional Council of Poitou-Charentes from March 1985 to March 1986. He later served as Minister of Education (1986–1988) in the government of Jacques Chirac. He succeeded Alain Poher as President of the Senate in 1992.

He served as President of the Senate for two terms. He was defeated for re-election to the post on 1 October 1998, withdrawing after the first round of voting; Christian Poncelet was elected in the third round.

He died in Loudun, aged 85.

== Political career ==
Governmental functions

- Minister of Industry, Commerce and Handicrafts : 1977–1978
- Minister of Economy : 1978–1981
- Minister of National Education : 1986–1988

Electoral mandates

Senate of France

- President of the Senate of France : 1992–1998. Reelected in 1995.
- Senator of the Vienne (departement) : 1968–1977, 1981–1986, 1986–2004. Elected in 1968, reelected in 1977 (But he stays minister), 1986 (But he stays minister), 1995.

Regional Council

- President of the Regional Council of Poitou-Charentes: 1985–1986.
- Regional councillor of Poitou-Charentes: 1973–1989 (Resignation). Elected in 1986.

General Council

- President of the General council of the Vienne: 1977–2004. Reelected in 1979, 1982, 1985, 1988, 1992, 1994, 1998, 2001.
- General councillor of the Vienne: 1961–2004. Reelected in 1967, 1973, 1979, 1985, 1992, 1998.

Municipal Council

- Mayor of Loudun: 1959–1999 (resignation). Reelected in 1965, 1971, 1977, 1983, 1989, 1995.
- Municipal councillor of Loudun: 1959–1999 (resignation). Reelected in 1965, 1971, 1977, 1983, 1989, 1995.

Community of communes Council

- President of the Communauté de communes of the Pays Loudunais: 1973–2002 (Resignation). Reelected in 1977, 1983, 1989, 1995, 2001.
- Member of the Communauté de communes of the Pays Loudunais: 1973–2002 (Resignation). Reelected in 1977, 1983, 1989, 1995, 2001.
