= Leader of the Opposition =

Leader of the largest faction of a legislature that is not in government

The leader of the Opposition is a title traditionally held by the leader of the largest political party not in government, typical in countries utilizing the parliamentary system form of government. The leader of the opposition is typically seen as an alternative prime minister (or other similar office, such as premier, minister-president, first minister, or chief minister) to the incumbent; in the Westminster system, they head a rival alternative government known as the shadow cabinet or opposition front bench. The same term is also used to refer to the leader of the largest political party that is not in government in subnational state, provincial, and other regional and local legislatures.

The full title for the Leader of the Opposition is the Leader of His Majesty's Most Loyal Opposition in the United Kingdom and in many Commonwealth realms.

== Current leaders of the opposition ==
=== Parliamentary systems ===
- Leader of the Opposition (Albania) (unofficial position)
- Leader of the Opposition (Armenia) (unofficial position)
- Leader of the Opposition (Austria) (unofficial position)
- Leader of the Opposition (Azerbaijan) (unofficial position)
- Leader of the Opposition (Bangladesh) (unofficial position)
- Leader of the Opposition (Bahrain) (unofficial position)
- Leader of the Opposition (Belgium) (unofficial position)
- Leader of the Opposition (Brunei) (unofficial position)
- Leader of the Opposition (Bulgaria) (unofficial position)
- Leader of the Opposition (Burkina Faso) (unofficial position)
- Leader of the Opposition (Burundi) (unofficial position)
- Leader of the Opposition (Cambodia)
- Leader of the Opposition (Cameroon) (unofficial position)
- Leader of the Opposition (Cape Verde) (unofficial position)
- Leader of the Opposition (Central African Republic) (unofficial position)
- Leader of the Opposition (Chad) (unofficial position)
- Leader of the Opposition (Comoros)
- Leader of the Opposition (Croatia) (unofficial position)
- Leader of the Opposition (Cyprus) (unofficial position)
- Leader of the Opposition (Czech Republic) (unofficial position)
- Leader of the Opposition (Denmark) (unofficial position)
- Leader of the Opposition (Djibouti) (unofficial position)
- Leader of the Opposition (Egypt) (unofficial position)
- Leader of the Opposition (Eritrea) (unofficial position)
- Leader of the Opposition (Estonia) (unofficial position)
- Leader of the Opposition (Ethiopia) (unofficial position)
- Leader of the Opposition (Finland) (unofficial position)
- Leader of the Opposition (France) (unofficial position)
- Leader of the Opposition (Gabon) (unofficial position)
- Leader of the Opposition (Georgia) (unofficial position)
- Leader of the Opposition (Germany) (unofficial position)
- Leader of the Opposition (Greece)
- Leader of the Opposition (Guinea) (unofficial position)
- Leader of the Opposition (Guinea-Bissau) (unofficial position)
- Leader of the Opposition (Hungary) (unofficial position)
- Leader of the Opposition (Indonesia) (unofficial position)
- Leader of the Opposition (Italy) (unofficial position)
- Leader of the Opposition (Israel)
- Leader of the Opposition (Jordan) (unofficial position)
- Leader of the Opposition (Kuwait) (unofficial position)
- Leader of the Opposition (Laos) (unofficial position)
- Leader of the Opposition (Latvia) (unofficial position)
- Leader of the Opposition (Lebanon) (unofficial position)
- Leader of the Opposition (Lithuania) (unofficial position)
- Leader of the Opposition (Madagascar) (unofficial position)
- Leader of the Opposition (Mauritania) (unofficial position)
- Leader of the Opposition (Mongolia) (unofficial position)
- Leader of the Opposition (Montenegro) (unofficial position)
- Leader of the Opposition (Morocco) (unofficial position)
- Leader of the Opposition (Mozambique) (unofficial position)
- Leader of the Opposition (the Netherlands) (unofficial position)
- Leader of the Opposition (Niger) (unofficial position)
- Leader of the Opposition (Nigeria) (unofficial position)
- Leader of the Opposition (North Macedonia) (unofficial position)
- Leader of the Opposition (Norway) (unofficial position)
- Leader of the Opposition (Oman) (unofficial position)
- Leader of the Opposition (Philippines) (unofficial position)
- Leader of the Opposition (Poland) (unofficial position)
- Leader of the Opposition (Portugal) (unofficial position)
- Leader of the Opposition (Romania) (unofficial position)
- Leader of the Opposition (Rwanda) (unofficial position)
- Leader of the Opposition (Sao Tome and Principe) (unofficial position)
- Leader of the Opposition (Senegal) (unofficial position)
- Leader of the Opposition (Serbia) (unofficial position)
- Leader of the Opposition (Slovakia) (unofficial position)
- Leader of the Opposition (Slovenia) (unofficial position)
- Leader of the Opposition (South Korea) (unofficial position)
- Leader of the Opposition (Spain) (unofficial position)
- Leader of the Opposition (Sudan) (unofficial position)
- Leader of the Opposition (Suriname) (unofficial position)
- Leader of the Opposition (Sweden) (unofficial position)
- Leader of the Opposition (Tanzania) (unofficial position)
- Leader of the Opposition (Togo) (unofficial position)
- Leader of the Opposition (Tunisia) (unofficial position)
- Leader of the Opposition (United Arab Emirates) (unofficial position)
- Leader of the Opposition (Zambia) (unofficial position)

==== Westminster system ====
- Leader of the Opposition (Antigua and Barbuda)
- Leader of the Opposition (Australia)
  - Leader of the Opposition in the Senate (Australia)
  - Leader of the Opposition (Australian Capital Territory)
  - Leader of the Opposition (New South Wales)
  - Leader of the Opposition (Northern Territory)
  - Leader of the Opposition (Queensland)
  - Leader of the Opposition (South Australia)
  - Leader of the Opposition (Tasmania)
  - Leader of the Opposition (Victoria)
  - Leader of the Opposition (Western Australia)
- Leader of the Opposition (Bahamas)
- Leader of the Opposition (Bangladesh)
- Leader of the Opposition (Barbados)
- Leader of the Opposition (Belize)
- Leader of the Opposition (Botswana)
- Leader of the Official Opposition (Canada)
  - Leader of the Opposition in the Senate (Canada)
  - Leader of the Opposition (Alberta)
  - Leader of the Opposition (British Columbia)
  - Leader of the Opposition (Manitoba)
  - Leader of the Opposition (New Brunswick)
  - Leader of the Opposition (Newfoundland and Labrador)
  - Leader of the Opposition (Nova Scotia)
  - Leader of the Opposition (Ontario)
  - Leader of the Opposition (Prince Edward Island)
  - Leader of the Opposition (Quebec)
  - Leader of the Opposition (Saskatchewan)
  - Leader of the Opposition (Yukon)
- Leader of the Opposition (Dominica)
- Leader of the Opposition (Fiji)
- Leader of the Opposition (the Gambia)
- Leader of the Opposition (Ghana)
- Leader of the Opposition (Grenada)
- Leader of the Opposition (India)
  - Leader of the Opposition in Lok Sabha
  - Leader of the Opposition in Rajya Sabha
  - Leader of the Opposition in State Legislature
- Leader of the Opposition (Ireland)
- Leader of the Opposition (Jamaica)
- Leader of the Opposition (Japan) (unofficial position)
- Leader of the Opposition (Lesotho)
- Leader of the Opposition (Malaysia)
  - Leader of the Opposition (Malaysian State Legislative Assemblies)
- Leader of the Opposition (Maldives)
- Leader of the Opposition (Malta)
- Leader of the Opposition (Mauritius)
- Leader of the Opposition (Nepal)
  - Leader of the Opposition in the National Assembly
  - Leader of the Opposition in the Koshi Provincial Assembly
  - Leader of the Opposition in the Bagmati Provincial Assembly
  - Leader of the Opposition in the Gandaki Provincial Assembly
  - Leader of the Opposition in the Lumbini Provincial Assembly
  - Leader of the Opposition in the Karnali Provincial Assembly
  - Leader of the Opposition in the Sudurpashchim Provincial Assembly
- Leader of the Opposition (New Zealand)
  - Leader of the Opposition (Cook Islands)
- Leader of the Opposition (Pakistan)
  - Leader of the Opposition of Punjab (Pakistan)
- Leader of the Opposition (Papua New Guinea)
- Leader of the Opposition (Saint Kitts and Nevis)
- Leader of the Opposition (Saint Lucia)
- Leader of the Opposition (Saint Vincent and the Grenadines)
- Leader of the Opposition (Samoa)
- Leader of the Opposition (Sierra Leone)
- Leader of the Opposition (Singapore)
- Leader of the Opposition (Solomon Islands)
- Leader of the Opposition (South Africa)
- Leader of the Opposition (Thailand)
- Leader of the Opposition (Trinidad and Tobago)
- Leader of the Opposition (Tuvalu)
- Leader of the Opposition (United Kingdom)
  - Leader of the Opposition (Wales)
  - Leader of the Opposition (Northern Ireland)
  - British Overseas Territories
    - Leader of the Opposition (Anguilla)
    - Leader of the Opposition (Bermuda)
    - Leader of the Opposition (British Virgin Islands)
    - Leader of the Opposition (Cayman Islands)
    - Leader of the Opposition (Gibraltar)
    - Leader of the Opposition (Montserrat)
    - Leader of the Opposition (Turks and Caicos Islands)
- Leader of the Opposition (Vanuatu)

=== Semi-presidential systems ===
- Leader of the Opposition in the French Senate
- Leader of the Opposition (Sri Lanka)

=== Presidential systems ===
- The Leader of the Opposition (Belarus)
- Leader of the Opposition (Seychelles)
- Leader of the Main Opposition (Turkey)
- Leader of the Opposition (Uganda)
- Leader of the Opposition (Zambia)

=== Other ===
- Leader of the Opposition (Guyana)

== Historical leader of the opposition positions ==
- Leader of the Opposition (Rhodesia)

== See also ==
- Minority leader, for a similar role in countries utilizing the presidential system
- Parliamentary opposition
- Shadow cabinet
- Controlled opposition
