= André Méric =

French politician (1913–1993)

Secretary of State for Veterans and War Victims
- In office 28 June 1988 – 15 May 1991
- President: François Mitterrand
- Prime Minister: Michel Rocard
- Preceded by: Jacques Mellick
- Succeeded by: Louis Mexandeau

Personal details
- Born: 14 August 1913 Toulouse, France
- Died: 14 August 1993 (aged 80) Calmont, France
- Party: Socialist Party

André Méric (14 August 1913 – 14 August 1993) was a French politician who was Senator of Haute-Garonne from 1948 to 1988, and president of the Socialist group in the Senate from 1980 to 1988.

== Biography ==
Méric was born in Toulouse (Haute-Garonne) on 14 August 1913. He became a militant socialist at the age of 15. As an apprentice mechanic Méric desired to become an accountant, qualifying on the eve of his departure for military service in 1939. After the armistice he joined the Resistance, but was arrested and deported to the Rava-Ruska concentration camp, located in East Prussia. After his liberation, he was elected to the General Council of Haute-Garonne. Three years later, he became the youngest senator of France aged thirty-five years. He was also elected mayor of Calmont in 1955.

In 1956, he became Vice-President of the Council of the Republic of France, and served as Vice-President of the Senate from 1958-1980. He replaced Alain Poher as the head of the Upper House in 1969 when he became the Interim President of the Fifth French Republic. As the party leader of the Socialists of the Senate, he served as president of the Socialist Party from 1980 to 1988.

In 1987, he was appointed Vice-Chairman of the committee to review the draft resolution on the indictment before the High Court of Justice of Christian Nucci, former Minister Delegate of the Co-operation and Development Ministry. In 1988, he joined the second Rocard government as Secretary of State for Veterans and War Victims and passed a special status for the prisoners of the Viet Minh during the Indochina War. In 1991, he announced his retirement from politics following the election of Édith Cresson.

=== Death ===
Méric died on 12 August 1993 in a car accident. He was traveling to an event in Calmont to celebrate his 80th birthday.

Following his death, Méric's son Georges succeeded him in the General Council, and later became president of the council's socialist party in 2015.

Political offices
| Preceded by Alain Poher | Acting President of the Senate; 1969 | Succeeded by Alain Poher |
| Preceded by Marcel Champeix | Leader of Socialist Group in the Senate; 1980–1988 | Succeeded by Claude Estier |
| Preceded by Marcel Champeix | Leader of the Opposition in the Senate; 1980–1988 | Succeeded by Claude Estier |
| Preceded by Jacques Mellick | Secretary of State for Veterans and War Victims; 1988–1991 | Succeeded by Louis Mexandeau |
