= Leader of the Opposition in the Senate =

Leader of the Opposition in the Senate may refer to:

- Leader of the Opposition in the Senate (Australia)
- Leader of the Opposition in the Senate (Canada)
- Leader of the Opposition in the French Senate
