= Jean-Pierre Bel =

French politician (born 1951)

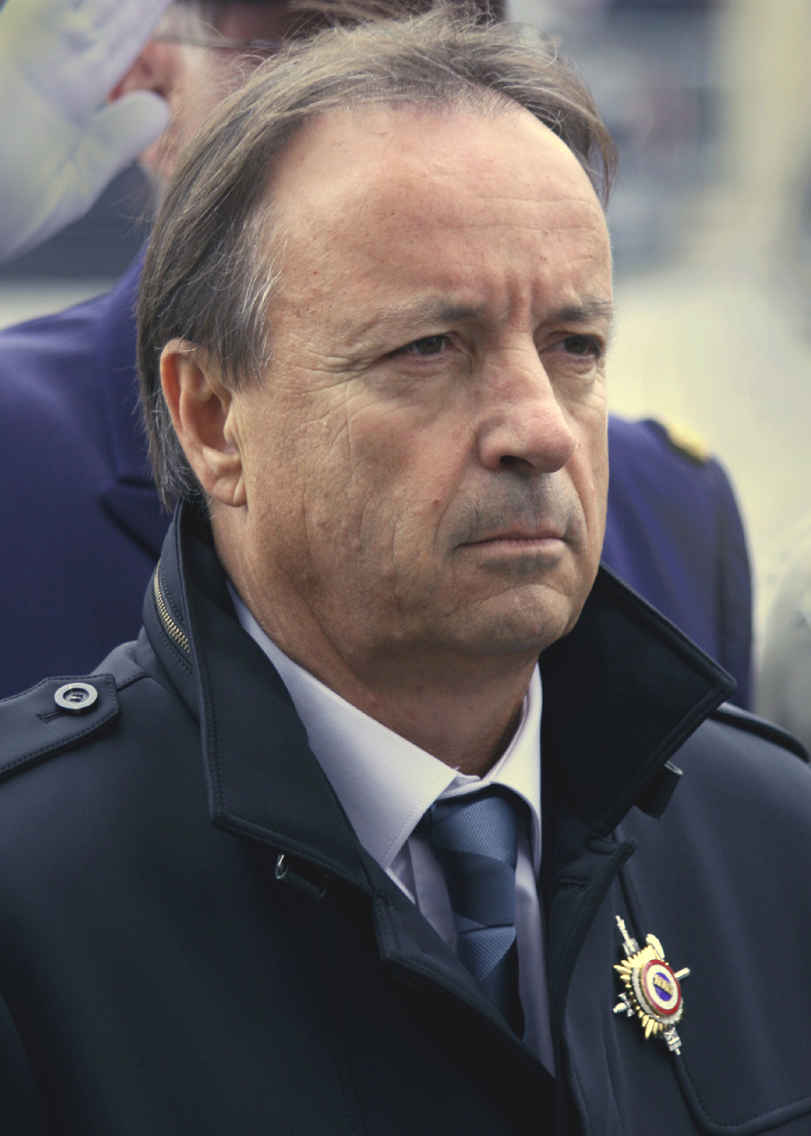
- Bel in 2011

President of the French Senate
- In office 1 October 2011 – 30 September 2014
- Preceded by: Gérard Larcher
- Succeeded by: Gérard Larcher

Leader of the Opposition in the Senate
- In office 1 October 2004 – 30 September 2011
- Preceded by: Claude Estier
- Succeeded by: Jean-Claude Gaudin

Senator for Ariège
- In office 1 October 1998 – 30 September 2014
- Preceded by: Germain Authié
- Succeeded by: Alain Duran

Personal details
- Born: Jean-Pierre Marcel Louis Bel; 30 December 1951 (age 74) Lavaur, France
- Party: Revolutionary Communist League (1968–1978); Socialist Party (1983–present)
- Education: Toulouse 1 University Capitole
- Profession: Jurist

Jean-Pierre Marcel Louis Bel (French pronunciation: [ʒɑ̃pjɛʁ bɛl]; born 30 December 1951) is a French retired politician who served as President of the Senate from 2011 to 2014 (the sole left-winger under the Fifth Republic). From the Ariège department, Bel is a member of the Socialist Party; he was elected to the Senate in September 1998 and re-elected in September 2008. Bel presided over the Socialist group in the Senate from 2004 to 2011.

Following his Senate tenure, he was appointed in 2015 as President François Hollande's personal envoy for Latin America and the Caribbean. He was instrumental in strengthening the ties with Cuba and Panama.

== Early political career ==
Bel served as a member of the Regional Council of Midi-Pyrénées (1992–1998) and General Council of Ariège (1998–2001), and held the mayorship of Mijanès (1983–1995) and Lavelanet (2001–2008).

== President of the Senate ==
Following the September 2008 Senate election, Bel was the Socialist candidate for the post of President of the Senate on 1 October 2008, but because the right held a majority of seats in the Senate, he was defeated by Gérard Larcher. In the vote, he received 134 votes against 173 votes for Larcher.

The left won a Senate majority in the September 2011 Senate election, and Bel was elected as President of the Senate on 1 October 2011. He received 179 votes against 134 votes for the right's candidate, outgoing Senate President Larcher; a centrist, Valérie Létard, received 29 votes.

His tenure as Senate President was marked by cuts to the body's operating budget. He retired at the September 2014 Senate election.

== Honours ==
- Knight of the Legion of Honour (2015)

== See also ==
- List of senators for Ariège

Political offices
| Preceded by Claude Estier | President of Socialist group in the Senate; 2004–2011 | Succeeded by François Rebsamen |
| Preceded by Claude Estier | Leader of the Opposition in the Senate; 2004–2011 | Succeeded by Jean-Claude Gaudin |
| Preceded by Gérard Larcher | President of the Senate; 2011–2014 | Succeeded by Gérard Larcher |
