= 2014 French Senate election =

- 28 September 2014

178 of 348 seats in the Senate 175 seats needed for a majority
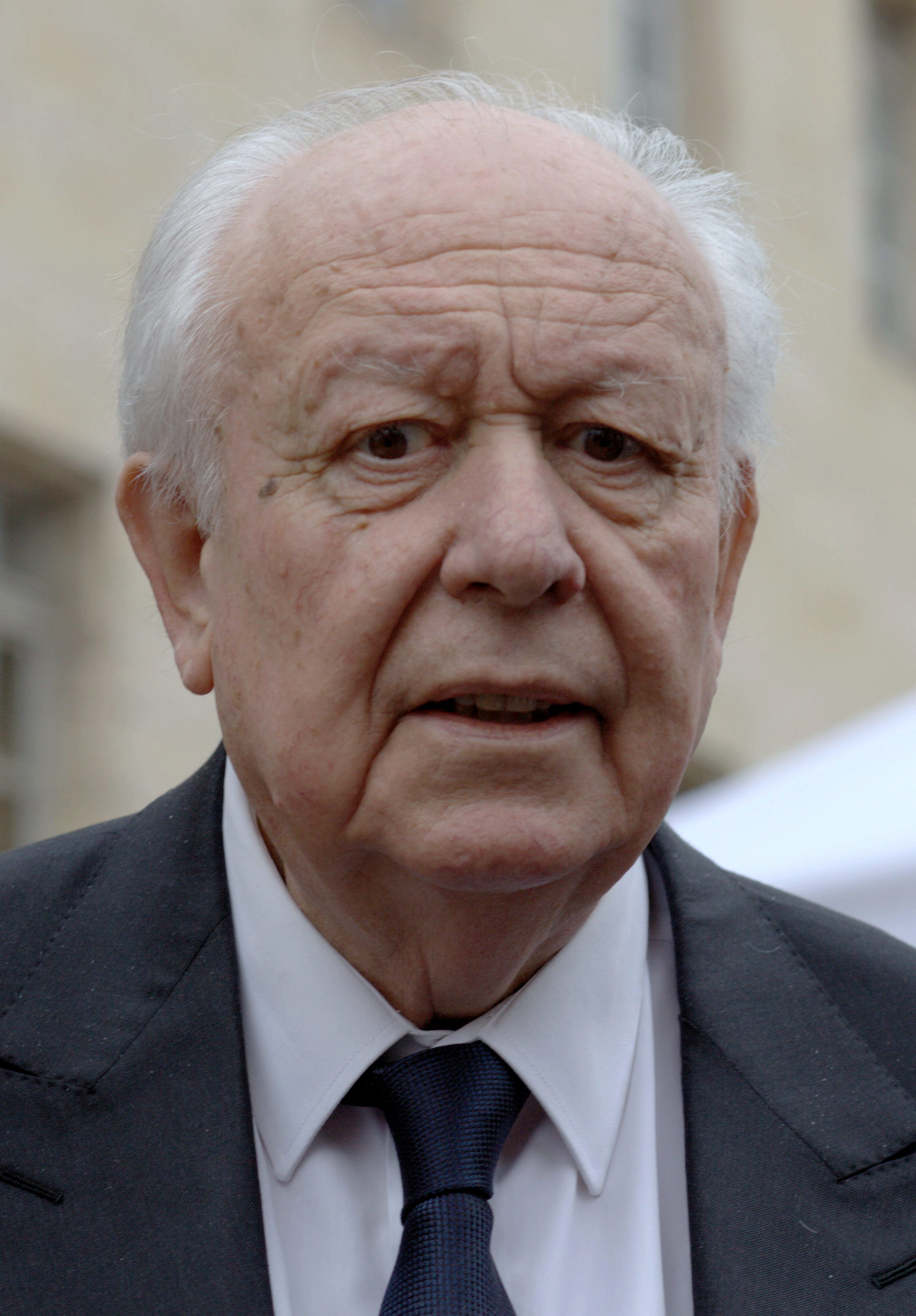

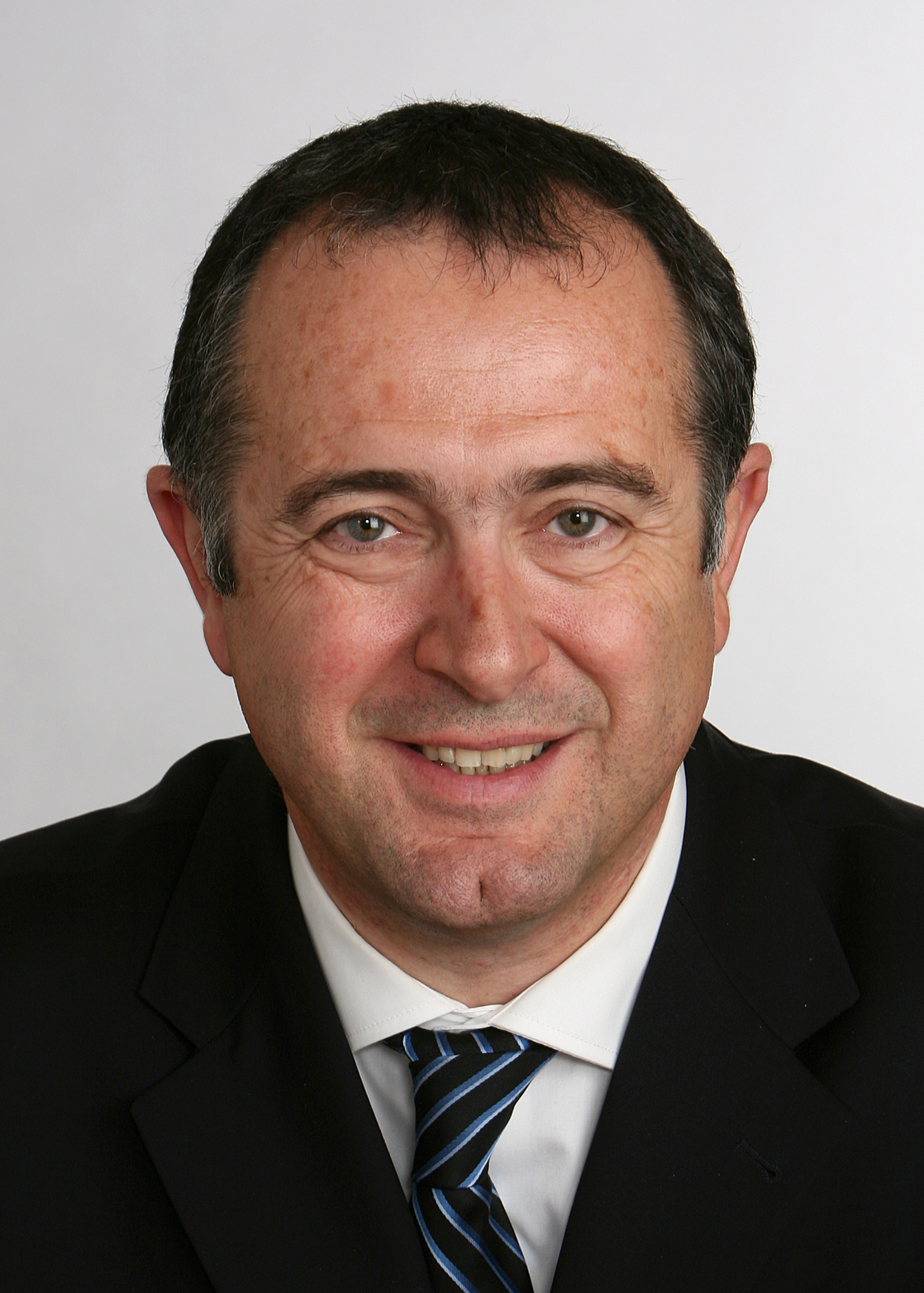

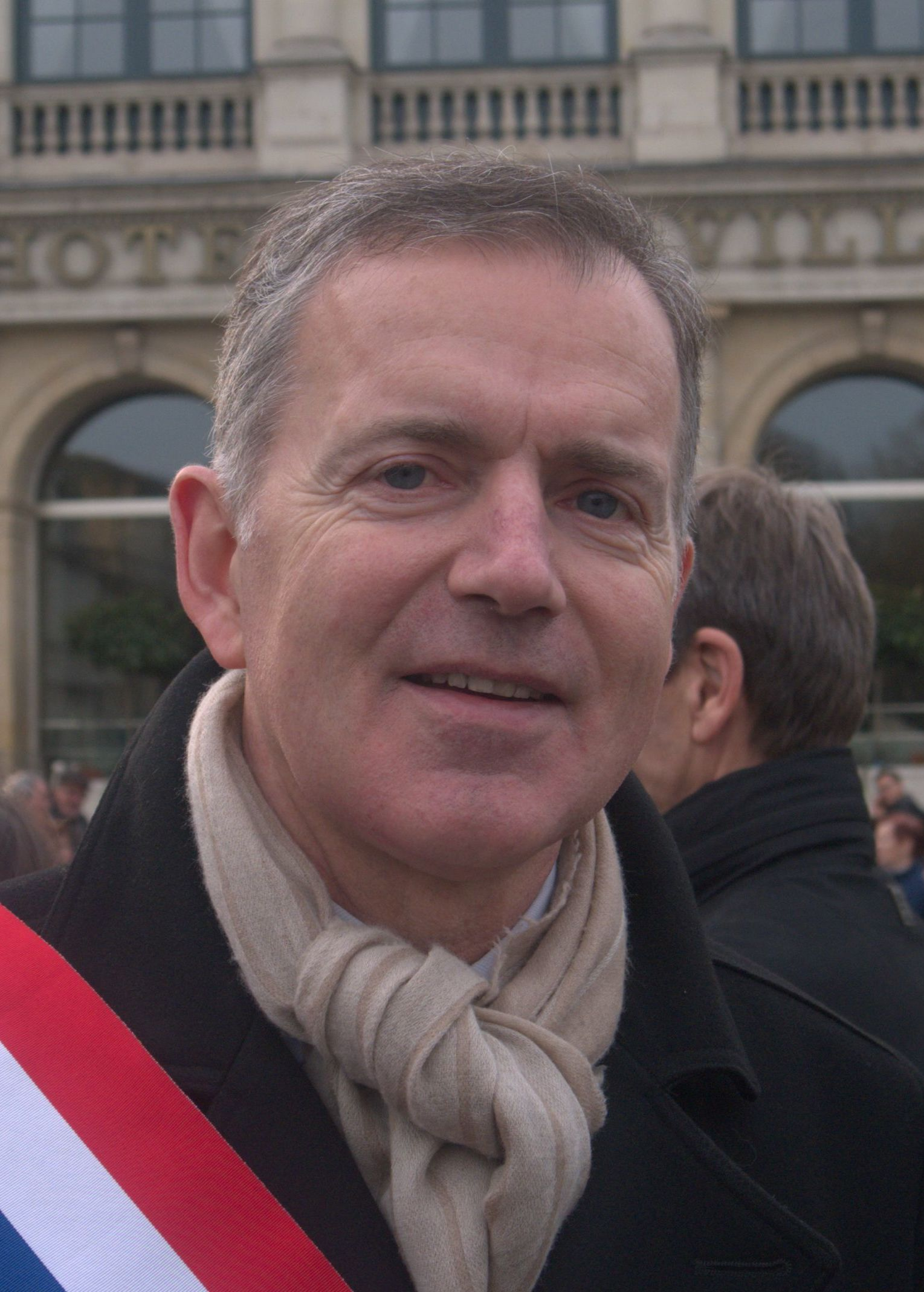

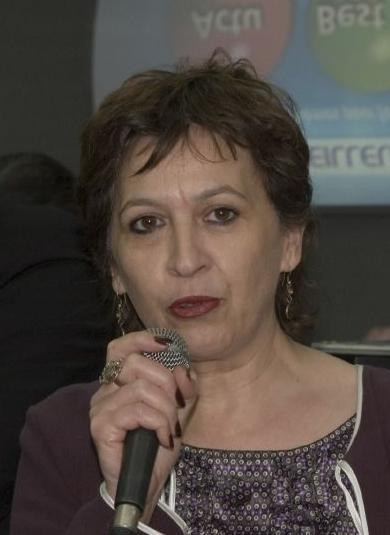

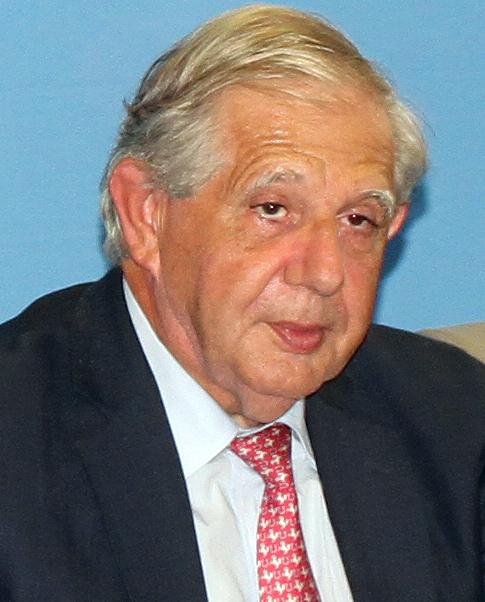

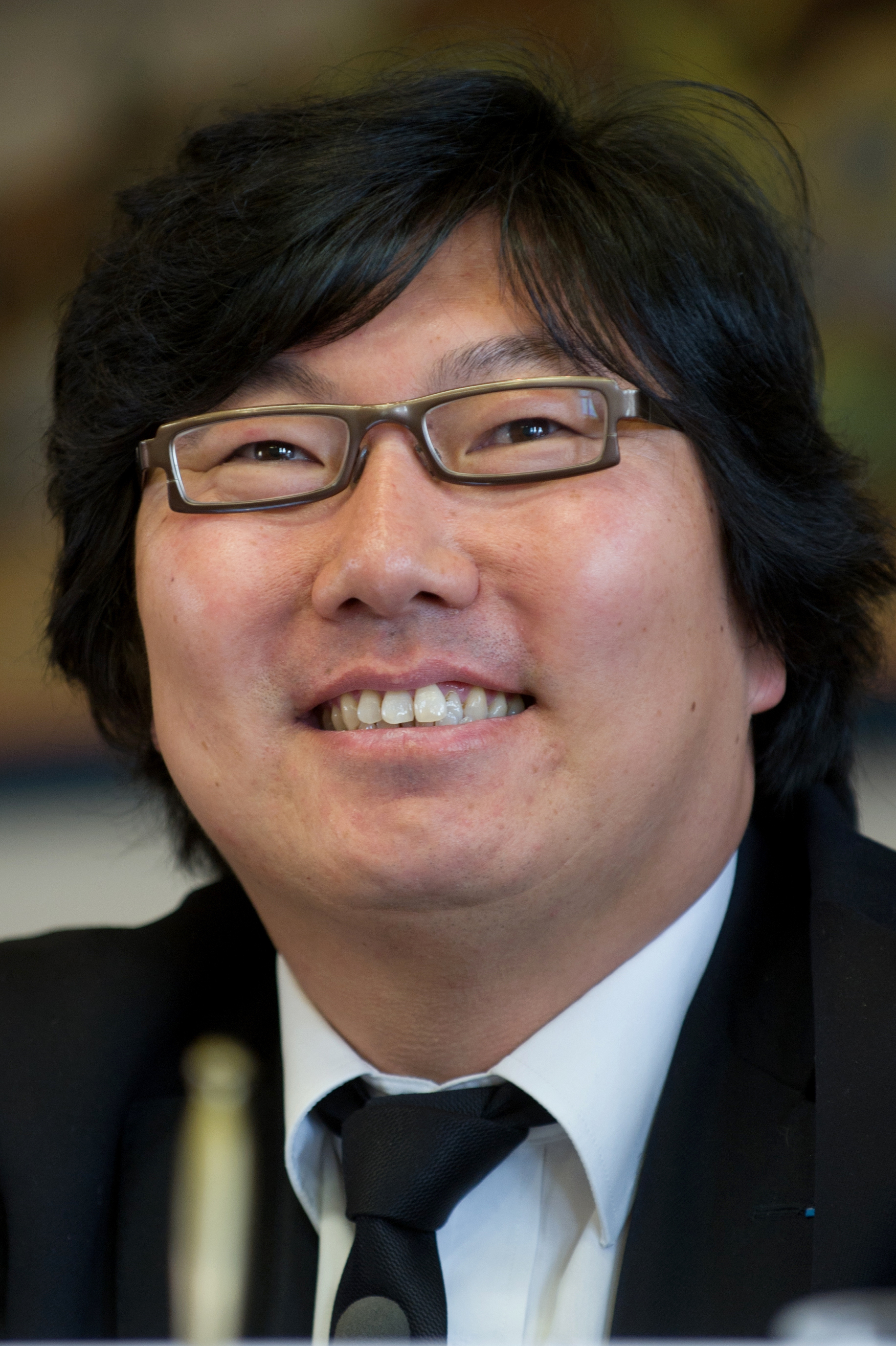
	Majority party	Minority party	Third party
Leader	Jean-Claude Gaudin	Didier Guillaume	François Zocchetto
Party	UMP	PS	UDI
Leader since	1 October 2008	15 April 2014	9 February 2011
Leader's seat	Bouches-du-Rhône	Drôme	Mayenne
Seats before	130	128	31
Seats after	144	111	43
Swing	▲14	▼17	▲12
	Fourth party	Fifth party	Sixth party
Leader	Éliane Assassi	Jacques Mézard	Jean-Vincent Placé
Party	PCF	RDSE	EELV
Leader since	19 September 2012	1 October 2011	11 January 2012
Leader's seat	Seine-Saint-Denis	Cantal	Essonne
Seats before	21	19	10
Seats after	18	13	10
Swing	▼3	▼6	Steady
President of the Senate before election
Jean-Pierre Bel
PS
President-elect of the Senate
Gérard Larcher
UMP

The 2014 French senate election was held on 28 September 2014 and featured results which saw the senate being reclaimed by the centre-right party Union for a Popular Movement (UMP). The right-wing conservative victory reversed the results which came during the previous 2011 French senate election, which was the first time since the foundation of the Fifth Republic in 1958 that the upper house of the French government had been won by a majority of left-wing candidates. Following the victory of the UMP, Gérard Larcher was nominated and subsequently elected to the position of president of the senate, taking the place of Jean-Pierre Bel who had served in the position following the Socialist Party's senate victory in 2011. The Far-right National Front party also claimed its first two seats in the senate election, which their leader Marine Le Pen described as "a historic victory".

== Background ==
=== Political context ===
Elections for the National Assembly were held on 10 and 17 June 2012. The Socialist Party combined with its allies to win 331 out of a potential 577 seats. These seats were composed of the Socialist Party winning 280 seats, the Greens winning 17, the Radical Party of the Left winning 12, and the Miscellaneous Left winning 22 seats. Results from the other parties saw the UMP win 194 seats, the Miscellaneous Right win 15, the New-Centre win 12, the Left-Front win 10, the Radical Party win 9, and other Independents win 6.

France held municipal elections on 23 March 2014, in which the results saw the Socialist Party lose control of 155 towns. Overall, the Socialist Party won 40% of the votes, which was only slightly above the record high abstention rate of 36%. Following the results of the municipal election, French President François Hollande announced that he would be changing the Prime Minister in his administration. The French Prime Minister at the time, Jean-Marc Ayrault, promptly resigned publicly on 31 March 2014, and was subsequently replaced by Manuel Valls on 1 April 2014.

On 23 August 2014, one month prior to the French senate election, the French economy minister Arnaud Montebourg criticised President Hollande, citing that France "shouldn't be aligning itself with the obsessions of the German right". The education minister Benoit Hamon also voiced his criticism of Hollande's government. These criticisms arose during a time of low growth for France, during which unemployment was 11%, and economic growth was 0.5%. In response, President Hollande tasked Valls with forming a new government more in line with the government's administration. Valls pledged that the new administration would focus on deficit cuts and pro-business tax reforms. These movements created a divide in the Socialist party, as an increasing number of ministers under Hollande's government agreed with Montebourg's views. Numerous centre-right politicians also called for Montebourg to step down from his position as economy minister.

=== Candidates ===
The 2014 French senate election saw 1,733 candidates run for 178 available seats in the senate. This was the highest number of recorded candidates to date, compared to 1,374 candidates in 2011, and 754 candidates in 2008, showing an increase of roughly 25% from 2011 to 2014. 118 candidates were running for their second consecutive term in the senate. Women made up 42% of candidates, which was slightly lower than the record of 43% set in the 2004 senate election. The youngest and oldest candidates were 24 and 88 years old respectively, with the average age being 55. The French senate has 348 total seats, which had risen from 343 in 2011 to reflect an increase in the total national population.

=== Election process ===
French Senatorial terms are six years in length, with roughly half of the total 348 positions being renewed every three years. Senators are elected for the country's 101 electoral areas, or departments, in which the number of available seats in each department loosely corresponds to the size of the area. Senators are chosen through elected officials, this including regional and city councillors, mayors, and members of the French National Assembly. Members of the general public do not vote for senate candidates. The elected officials for the 2014 senate election total at 87,092, with municipal council delegates making up approximately 95.5% of all votes. General councillors and regional advisers make up 2.7% and 1.2% of delegates respectively, with the remaining 0.6% being senators and deputies.

=== Influential factors ===
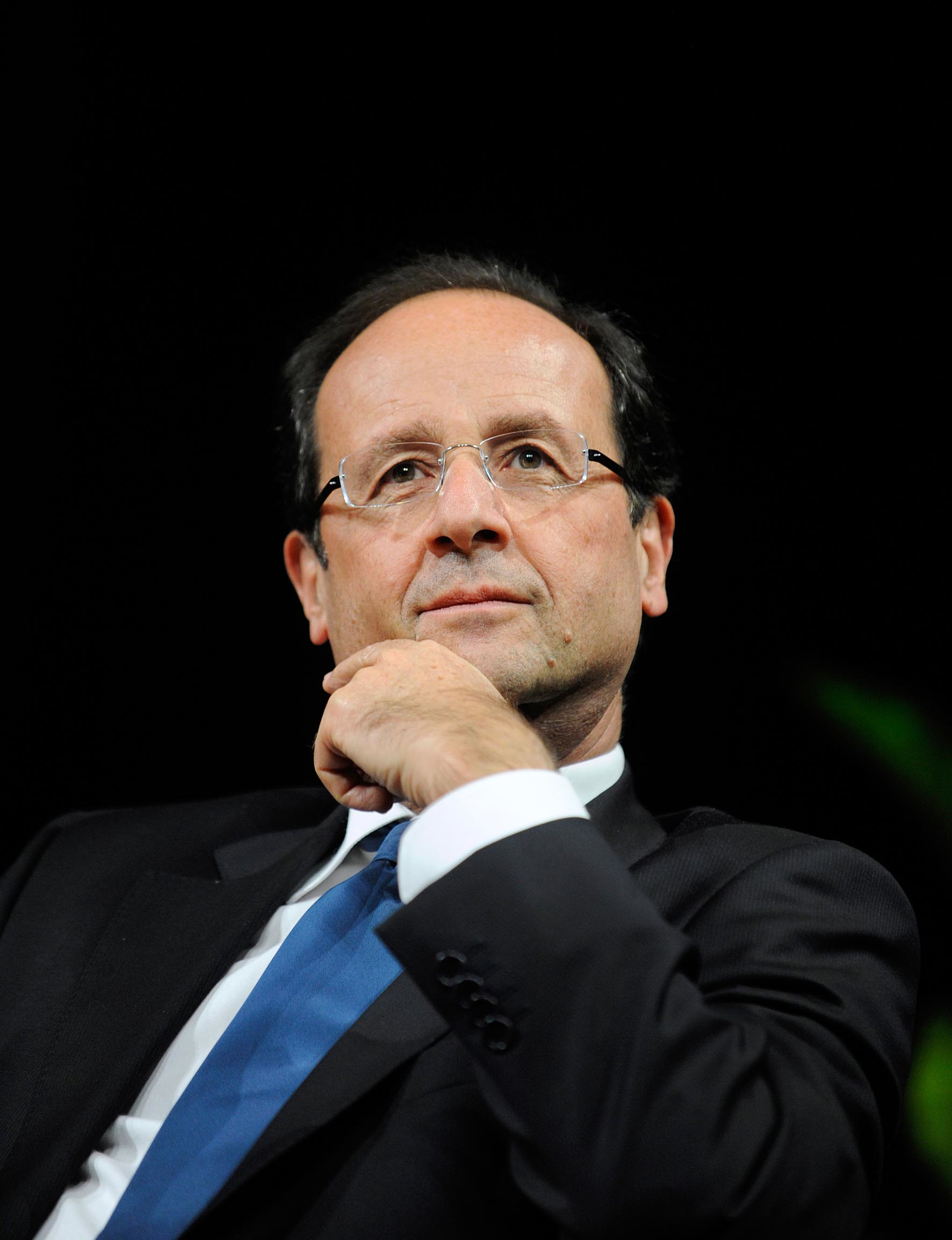
François Hollande, the French President at the time of the 2014 senate election

Hollande and his socialist government faced heavy criticism as France struggled economically from 2013 to 2014, leading to a period of zero economic growth, high unemployment, an increasing budget deficit, and higher taxes for the French people. Hollande's former partner, Valerie Trierweiler, also described him as power hungry and disdainful towards the poor. This all contributed to a poor public perception of Hollande, leading to him being the most unpopular president in modern French history with a record low approval rating of 13% in 2014. These factors then led to forecasts of a humiliating Socialist Party defeat in the senate.

== Results ==
The Conservative UMP and its allies in the Centrist Union of Democrats and Independents (UDI) claimed 188 seats in the senate election, exceeding the number needed for an absolute majority by 13 seats. The UMP also made net gains of 14 seats, ending with a total of 144, in contrast to the Socialist Party who lost 17 seats, to finish with a grand total of 111. Centre and far left Socialist Allies also lost 9 seats while keeping 30 total, and the Greens were able to retain all 10 of their seats in the senate. Following the results 77% of seats in the senate were taken by men, and 23% were occupied by women.

The Far-right National Front (FN) party was able to claim two seats in the senate for the first time, as senators Stéphane Ravier and David Rachline were elected in the Bouches-du-Rhône region and Var respectively. Senator David Rachline at 26 years old is the youngest French senator ever elected to date. These victories by the FN enabled the political breakthrough of their leader, Marine Le Pen, as she attempted to redefine the public image of the FN, following the departure of her father, Jean-Marie Le Pen, from the party in 2011. The National Front was able to capitalise on recent success it found in local elections, including topping the European parliament vote in May 2014. Ravier also commented on the FN party's victory, stating that, "There is only one door left for us to push and it is that of the Élysée [presidential palace]".

The election of senators Teura Iriti and Vincent Dubois, who were elected in French Polynesia, were annulled by the French constitutional court, after it was found that supporters of the presiding Tahoeraa Huiraatira Party had marched to polling stations, consequently placing excessive pressure on the electoral college. A new election was then scheduled on 3 May 2015, in which Nuihua Laurey and Lana Tetuanui were instead elected to the French senate.

== Senate Presidency ==
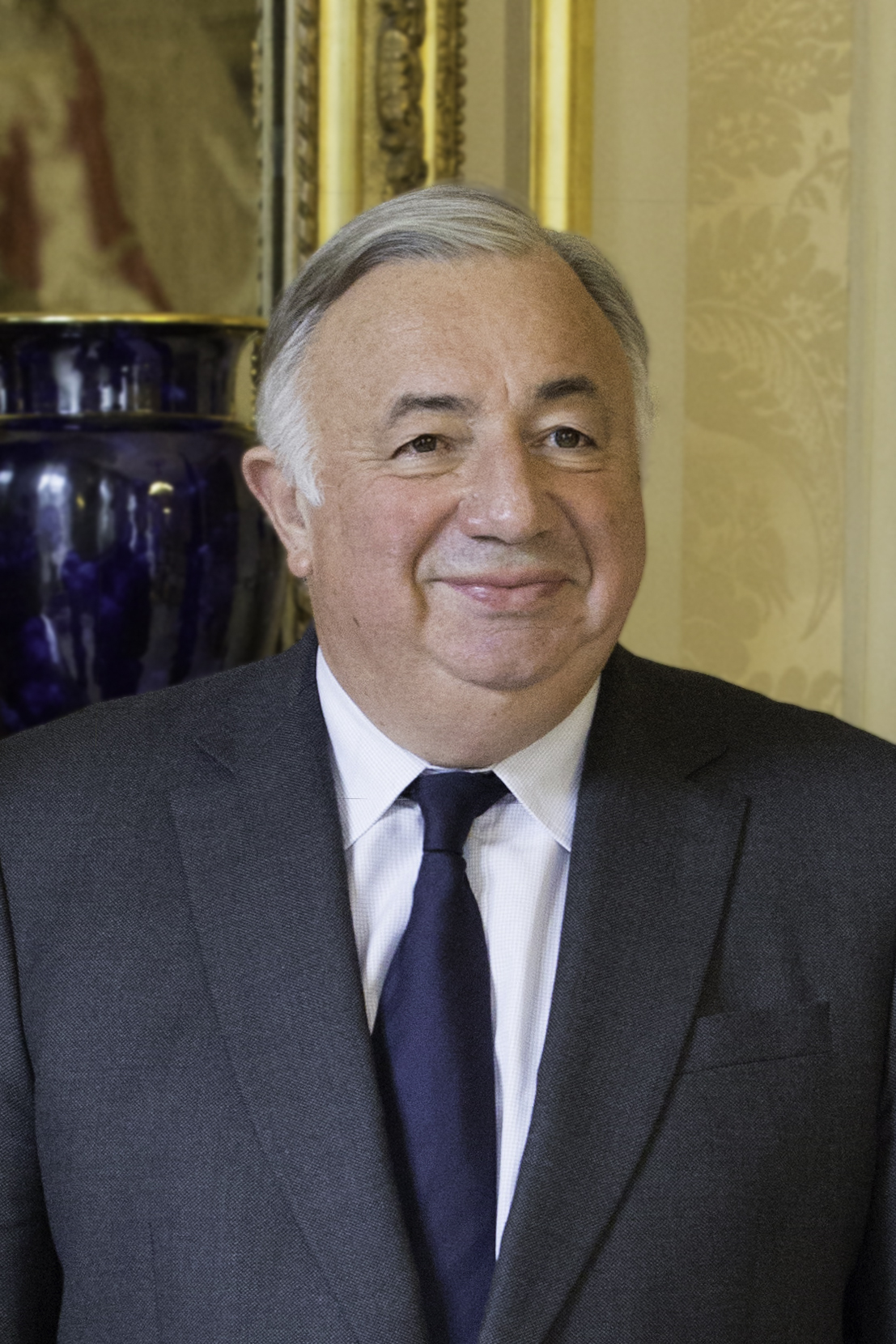
Gérard Larcher, who successfully won the position of Senate President in 2014

Jean-Pierre Bel resided as president of the senate following the Socialist Party's victory in the senate in 2011. He decided not to stand for re-election in 2014 and consequently stood down from his position as president, along with 57 other senators who did not run again for seats they already held in the senate. Bel did not run again for his seat in Ariége. Prior to the election, Jean-Pierre Raffarin, Gérard Larcher, and Philippe Marini were all touted as potential successors for the position of the senate president, all of them from the UMP. Following the 2014 election and the new right-wing majority, Gérard Larcher became the new president of the senate, a position which he had previously occupied from 2008 to 2011, when the UMP had controlled the senate. Larcher received 145 votes, which was slightly above Didier Guillaume of the Socialist Party, who received 112 votes. Phillippe Marini received only 1 vote during the presidency election process.

=== Gérard Larcher ===
Gérard Larcher first ran for the position of president of the senate in 2008, in which he was nominated against former prime minister Jean-Pierre Raffarin. Larcher won, receiving 173 votes. Jean-Pierre Bel received 134 votes, and other UMP candidates René Garrec and Jean-Pierre Raffarin received 19 and 2 votes respectively. In the 2011 senate election, the Socialist party and their allies won 177 seats, compared to 171 won by the right and centre-right. The loss of the senate to the left preceded Larcher's eventual removal from the position of Presidency.

=== Jean-Pierre Bel ===
Jean-Pierre Bel was successfully voted in as Senate President on 2 October 2011 following the French senate election in 2011. Bel was elected in with 179 votes, just ahead of Gérard Larcher who received 134 votes, and centrist senator Valérie Létard who received 29 votes. Bel also ran for president of the senate in 2008. He received 134 votes but was defeated by Larcher's 173 votes.

=== Jean-Pierre Raffarin ===
Jean-Pierre Raffarin served as the vice president of the senate from 2011 to 2014. He was first elected to a position in the senate in 1995 in the region of Vienne, and was appointed to the position of Prime Minister in 2002 by the president at the time, Jacques Chirac. He attempted to become president of the senate in 2008 but was unsuccessful, as he was unable to secure the backing of the UMP, which Gérard Larcher instead received. Despite rumours of a potential run for senate president in 2014, he did not end up putting himself forward for the position.

== Ramifications in French Politics ==
The right-wing victory by the UMP in the senate helped former president Nicolas Sarkozy in his attempts to return to head the UMP, as it provided momentum through which he was able to build his position within the party. The result also exacerbated the public's negative sentiment towards the Socialist Party, as opinion polls following the senate election projected Marine Le Pen beating François Hollande in the 2017 presidential election. Additionally, the Socialist defeat in the senate further impeded progress of Hollande's economic plans for the nation, despite the Socialist Party still controlling the National Assembly at the time.

By March 2016 the senate composition had varied slightly. The senate was made up of 144 seats from The Republicans (the UMP renamed themselves to The Republicans in 2015), 109 from the Socialist Party, 42 from the UDI, 19 from the Communist Republic and Citizen Group, 17 from the Democratic and Social European Rally, 11 from the Ecologist Group, and 6 others.

The Republicans were projected to consolidate their majority in the 2017 senate election. The centrist Republic on the Move! party were consequently forced to attempt to ally themselves with centrists and moderate republicans, as the results of the 2014 senate election meant they were unable to rely on a left-wing senate majority in order to pass their pro-business reforms.
