= Claude Estier =

French politician and journalist

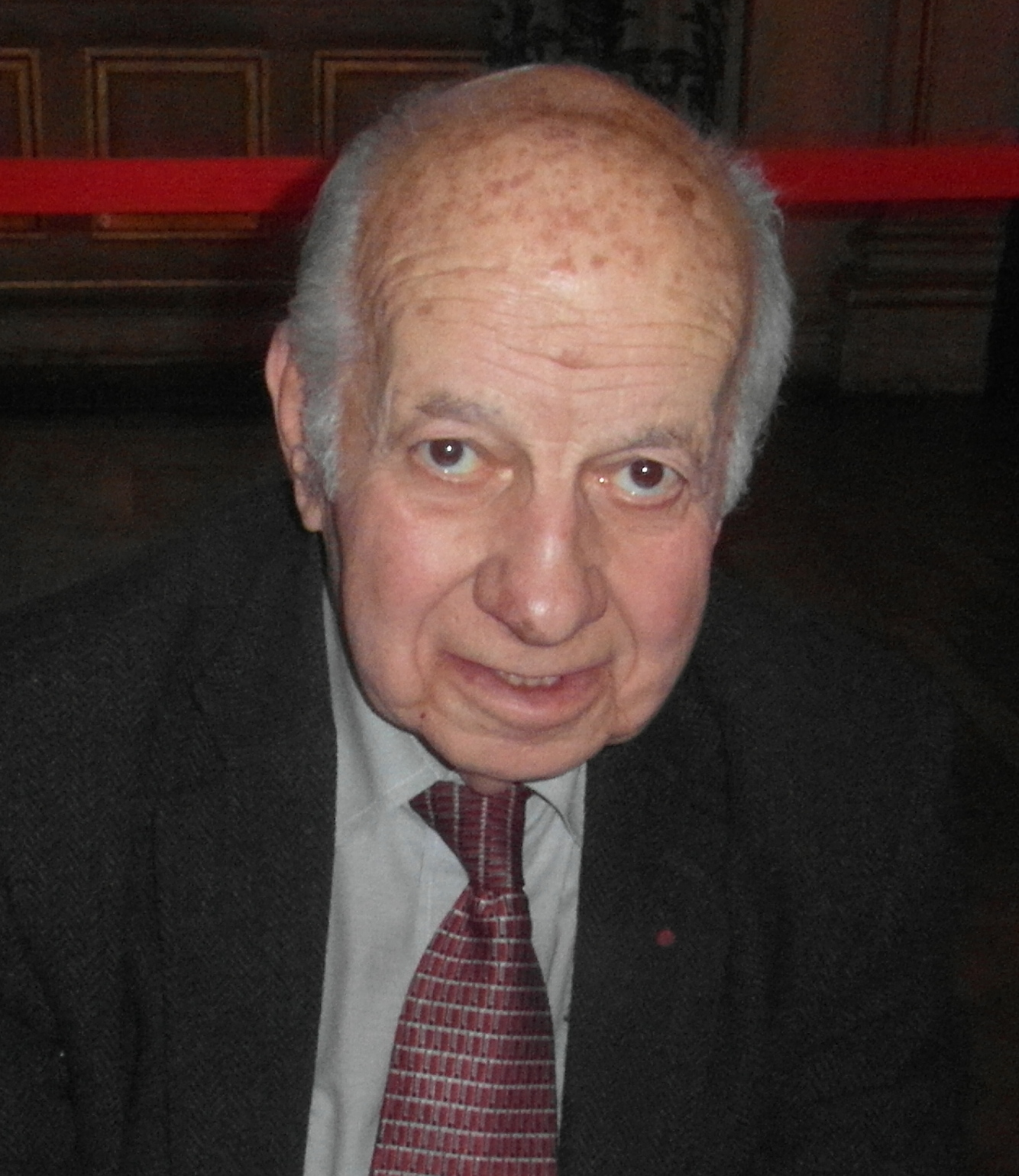

Member of the French Senate
- In office 1 October 1986 – 30 September 2004
- Constituency: Paris

Member of the French National Assembly
- In office 23 June 1981 – 27 June 1986
- Constituency: Paris's 25th constituency

Member of the European Parliament
- In office 21 June 1979 – 16 April 1981 (Note: He had to quit before the end of his term as he was elected in 1981 to the French National Assembly)
- Constituency: France

Member of the French National Assembly
- In office 25 June 1967 – 24 June 1968
- Constituency: Paris's 25th constituency

Personal details
- Born: Claude Hasday Ezratty; 8 June 1925 Paris, France
- Died: 10 March 2016 (aged 90) Paris, France
- Party: French Section of the Workers' International (1945-1947), Unitary Socialist Party (1948), Convention of Republican Institutions (1964-1971), Socialist Party (1971-2016)
- Other political affiliations: PS
- Education: Sciences Po

Claude Estier (born Claude Hasday Ezratty; (Note: He became officially "Claude Estier" by a decree published in the Official Journal on 11 September 1983) 8 June 1925 – 10 March 2016) was a French politician and journalist. He was deputy of Paris from 1967 to 1968 and again from 1981 to 1986, then senator from 1986 to 2004 and was president of the socialist group in the Senate from 1988 to 2004.

== Biography ==
=== Early life ===
Estier's father was a supporter of the French Section of the Workers' International (SFIO). Because of this, Estier grew up in a socialist culture throughout his youth. His professors included Robert Verdier and Maurice Merleau-Ponty.

=== Resistance ===
Estier participated in the Résistance in 1942, engaging in the carriage of arms and newspapers in Lyon until 1944. In charge of reports of listening to Radio Londres and Radio Algiers, the Free France broadcasts, he ended the war in the French Forces of the Interior.

In 1945, he then became a member of the centre-left French Section of the Workers' International (SFIO). A very critical article on the SFIO Interior Minister Jules Moch's harsh repression of the 1947 strikes published in the newspaper Combat at the end of 1947 led to his exclusion from the party.

He campaigned in 1948 for the Unitary Socialist Party (Note: Not to be confused with the later Unified Socialist Party (PSU), of whom Gilles Martinet was a cofounder) where he met, among others, Gilles Martinet and Pierre Stibbe. All three were former Résistance fighters who advocated a left-wing political line between the French Communist Party and the anti-communist SFIO.

=== Journalist ===
In 1955 he joined the political editorial team of daily newspaper Le Monde, then quit it in 1958 because of the newspaper's "attentiste" attitude towards the return to power of General de Gaulle. He then joined another newspaper, Libération and began a rapprochement with François Mitterrand. He was part of the original core of the weekly Nouvel Observateur.

He was a long-time supporter of the Algerian cause, establishing ties with Algerian nationalists such as Ferhat Abbas.

== Political career ==
=== National Assembly ===
He was elected as a candidate for Mitterrand's Convention of Republican Institutions, part of the Federation of the Democratic and Socialist Left electoral coalition, in the legislative election of 1967 against Alexandre Sanguinetti, Minister of Veterans and War Victims in the third Pompidou government under President de Gaulle. He lost his seat the following year, after the early dissolution of the National Assembly in the aftermath of the May 1968 events.

He was elected again in 1981 and became chairman of the Foreign Affairs Committee of the National Assembly from 1983 to 1986.

He had put a provisional end to his activities as a journalist in 1967, but from 1972 to 1986 he led the official weekly of the Socialist Party, L'Unité. From 1981 to 1988, he regularly took part as such in the animated weekly political debate Vendredi Soir on France Inter with Jean d'Ormesson (a right-wing journalist and writer), Pierre Charpy (his counterpart as head of La Lettre de la Nation, the weekly of the Rally for the Republic) and Roland Leroy (editor-in-chief of the Communist daily L'Humanité).

=== Senate ===
In 1986, he entered the Senate in 1988 and became President of the Socialist Group until his retirement in October 2004.

== Post-Senator career ==
After this, he returned to writing about history and politics by publishing four new books with Le Cherche-Midi, including François Hollande: journal d'une victoire (2012).

=== Elected offices held ===
- Deputy representing Paris (1967-1968 and 1981-1986)
- Paris City councillor (1971-1989 and 1995-2001)
- Member of the European Parliament (1979-1981)
- Île-de-France regional councilor (1981-1986)
- Senator representing Paris (1986-2004)

== Notes ==
Political offices
| Preceded by André Méric | Leader of Socialist Group in the Senate; 1988–2004 | Succeeded by Jean-Pierre Bel |
| Preceded by André Méric | Leader of the Opposition in the Senate; 1988–2004 | Succeeded by Jean-Pierre Bel |
