= Jean Nayrou =

French politician (1914–1983)

Senator of Ariège
- In office 18 June 1955 – 1 October 1980
- Preceded by: Henri Assaillit
- Succeeded by: Germain Authié

Personal details
- Born: 3 December 1914 Esplas-de-Sérou, Ariège
- Died: 6 February 1983 (aged 68) Foix, Ariège
- Party: SFIO (1932–1969); Socialist (1969–1983)

Jean Nayrou (1914–1983) was a French politician who was Senator of Ariège from 1955 to 1980.

== Bibliography ==
- Page on the Senate website
