= Germain Authié =

French politician

Senator of Ariège
- In office 1 October 1980 – 30 September 1998
- Preceded by: Jean Nayrou
- Succeeded by: Jean-Pierre Bel

Personal details
- Born: 4 July 1927 Celles, Ariège
- Died: 4 September 2001 (aged 74) Saint-Jean-de-Verges, Ariège
- Party: SFIO (1952-1969); Socialist (1969-2001)

Germain Authié (1927–2001) was a French politician. He served as Senator of Ariège from 1980 to 1998.

== Biography ==
The son of Vincent Authié, a tailor, and Joséphine Bibes, a shopkeeper, Germain Authié became a special education teacher and education unionist. In 1952, he joined the French Section of the Workers' International (SFIO) and then became a municipal councilor in Auzat from 1959 to 1965. He was elected general councilor for the canton of Cabannes in 1976 and then mayor of Sinsat in 1977, being re-elected several times during these two terms of office.

As president of the departmental association of mayors, he was behind the creation of the Plateau de Beille winter sports resort.

Succeeding Jean Nayrou, he was elected senator for Ariège in 1980 in the first round, then re-elected in 1989 in this long-standing socialist department, which has only one representative in the Luxembourg Palace.

== Bibliography ==
- Page on the Senate website
