= Henri Torre =

French politician (1933–2025)

Henri Torre (12 April 1933 – 18 April 2025) was a French politician, and a member of the UMP. He was a Secretary of State in the government of Pierre Messmer in the early 1970s. He was a graduate of HEC Paris. Torre died on 18 April 2025, at the age of 92.

== Refusal of the Legion of Honor ==
Henri Torre was promoted to the rank of Knight of the National Order of the Legion of Honour as part of the 1 January 2012, promotion. However, he declined the decoration, citing two main reasons:

- Devaluation of the Legion of Honor: Torre expressed that the Legion of Honor no longer held the same prestige as it once did. He criticized the large number of recipients each year, stating, "This promotion is done haphazardly and is often awarded to just anyone."
- Political Disapproval: Torre also cited political reasons for his refusal. In the lead-up to the 2012 presidential election, he publicly stated his disapproval of then-President Nicolas Sarkozy's actions and leadership. Torre remarked, "I do not appreciate the way Nicolas Sarkozy has conducted himself as the head of this country. He no longer has my support today."
