= 1995 French municipal elections =

Municipal elections were held in France on 11 and 18 June 1995, more or less than one month after Jacques Chirac's election.

The far-right National Front elected three mayors in Provence: Toulon, Orange, Marignane. This was the first time the far-right led an executive alone. In other races, Jean Tiberi (RPR) succeeded Jacques Chirac as mayor of Paris. In Marseille, the UDF-Republican Jean-Claude Gaudin succeeded the socialist Gaston Defferre. In Lyon, former UDF Prime Minister Raymond Barre succeeded to another right-wing incumbent mayor.

== Results ==
Party/alliance	% (first round)	Seats
RPR-UDF	53.80	312,678
PS-PCF-MDC-MRG	40.10	191,555
FN	3.90	1,249
Les Verts-Other ecologists	1.03	1,779
Far-Left	0.74	642
Miscellaneous	0.29	291
Regionalists	0.10	424
Far-Right	0.04	114

== Sources ==
- Locals 1995
