= Departmental Council of Ariège =

Departmental legislature in France

- Logo of the Council

Leadership
- President: Christine Téqui, PS

Website
- ariege.fr

The Departmental Council of Ariège (French: Conseil départemental de l'Ariège, Occitan: Conselh departamental d'Arièja) is the deliberative assembly of the French department of Ariège. Its headquarters are in Foix.

== Composition ==
The departmental council of Ariège includes 26 departmental councilors elected from the 13 cantons of Ariège.

Composition by party (as of 2021)
Party	Acronym	Seats	Groups
Majority (21 seats)
Socialist Party	PS	19	Ariège notre avenir en commun
Miscellaneous left	DVG	2	Ariège notre avenir en commun
Opposition (5 seats)
Miscellaneous right	DVD	1	Ariège positive
Miscellaneous left	DVG	2	Un projet partagé
Miscellaneous right	DVD	1	Libres et solidaires
Miscellaneous left	DVG	1	Libres et solidaires

== Executive ==
=== President ===
Henri Nayrou succeeded Augustin Bonrepaux (PS), who had been in office since 2001 and had resigned, as the president of the general council of Ariège on November 3, 2014. Following the departmental elections of 2015, Henri Nayrou was elected president of the new departmental council with 17 votes against 7 for Benoît Alvarez (DVG). Nayrou subsequently resigned, and Christine Téqui was elected to replace him on November 8, 2019.

=== Vice-presidents ===
In addition to the president, the executive has 6 vice-presidents.

Vice-presidents of the Departmental Council of Ariège (since 2021)
Order	Name	Party	Canton (constituency)	Delegation
1st	Jean-Paul Ferré	PS	Val d'Ariège	Environmental and societal transition, economic development and integration
2nd	Alain Naudy	PS	Haute-Ariège	Infrastructures
3rd	Marie-France Vilaplana	PS	Pamiers-1	Solidarity
4th	Nicole Quillien	PS	Mirepoix	Education
5th	Raymond Berdou	PS	Arize-Lèze	Culture, youth, sports and citizenship
6th	Véronique Rumeau	PS	Foix	Administration and finance
