= 2008 French Senate election =

- 21 September 2008

A third of seats (114) to the French Senate
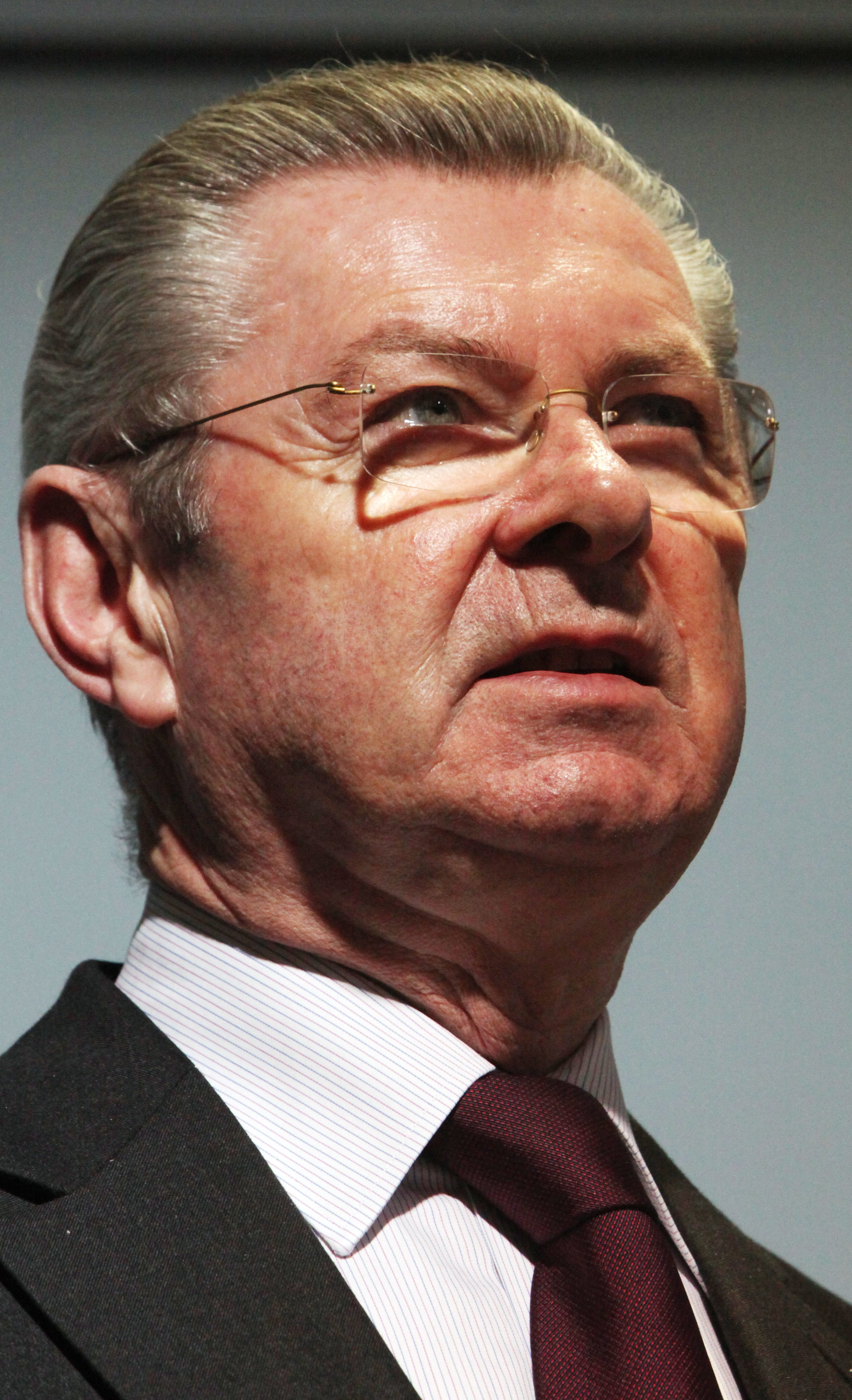

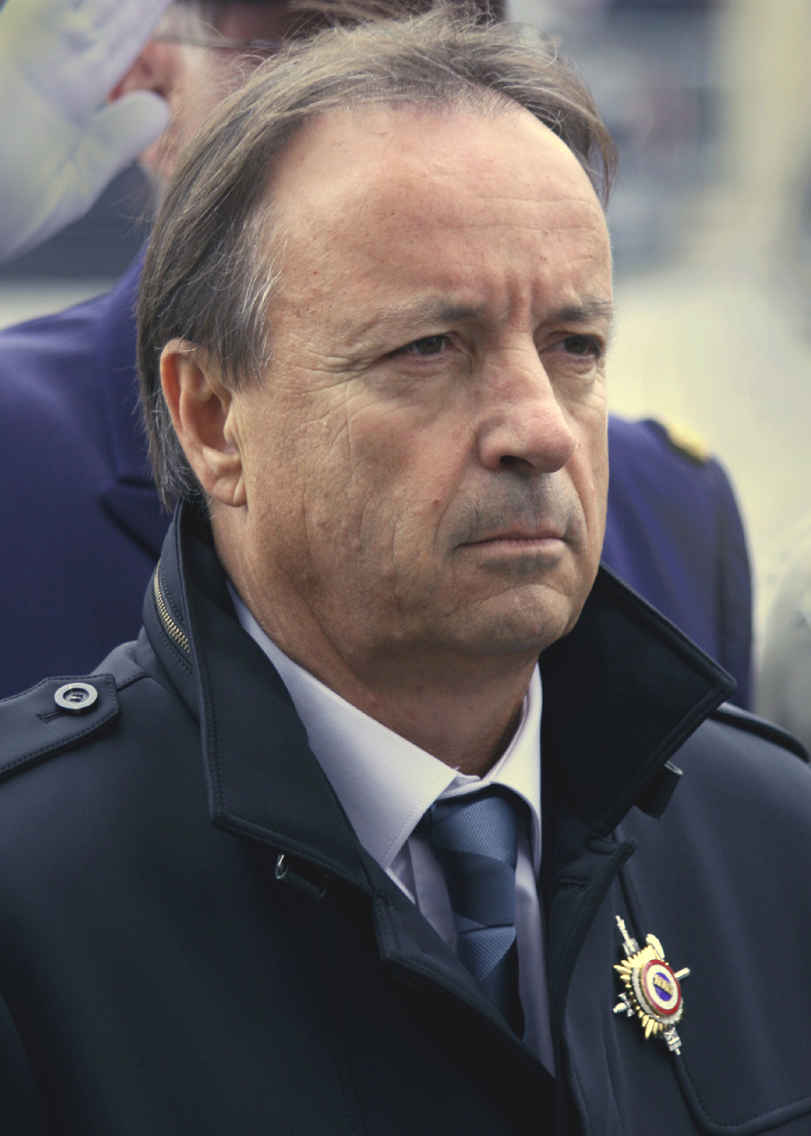

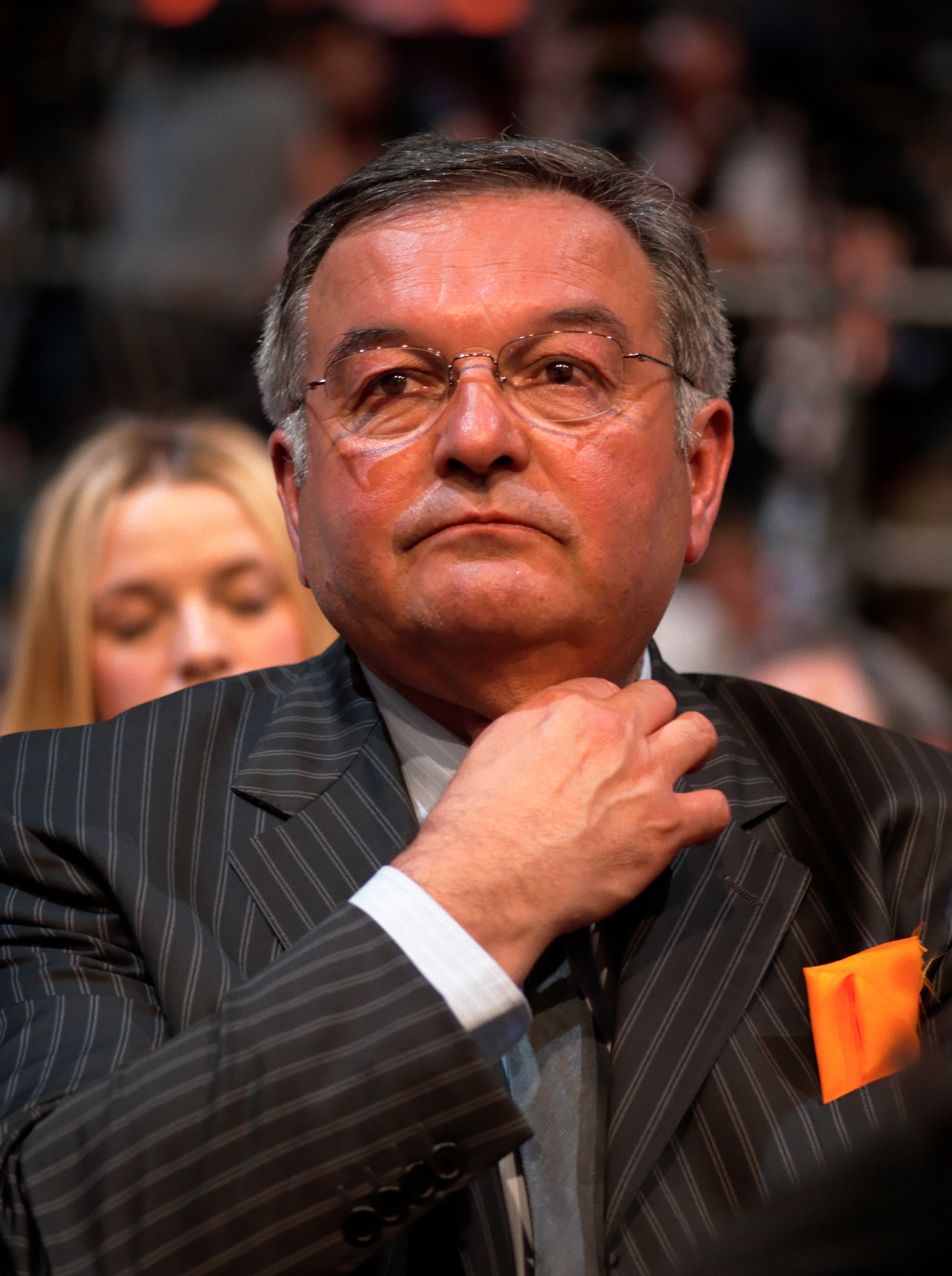
	First party	Second party	Third party
Leader	Henri de Raincourt	Jean-Pierre Bel	Michel Mercier
Party	UMP	PS	UDF
Leader's seat	Yonne	Ariège	Rhône
Last election	159	95	30
Seats won	151	116	29
Seat change	▼8	▲21	▼1
President of the Senate before election
Christian Poncelet
UMP
Elected President of the Senate
Gérard Larcher
UMP

Indirect Senate elections were held for 114 of the 343 seats in the French Senate on 21 September 2008. With this election, the number of senators was increased from 331 to 343; Saint Barthélemy and Saint Martin elected two senators each for the first time. Furthermore, this election was the last to be held under the old system: prior to this election, senators were elected in three classes for nine-year terms. Under the new system instituted in 2011, senators are elected for six-year terms in two classes.

== New seats ==
Twelve new seats were filled in this election. They were divided in the following way: 1 new Senator each for the Ain, Alpes-Maritimes, Bouches-du-Rhône, Drôme, Eure-et-Loir, Haute-Garonne, Gironde, Hérault, and Guyane départements and one in French Polynesia.

The election marked the first time that French Polynesia had two seats in the Senate instead of just one. The President of French Polynesia Gaston Tong Sang and another member of his coalition, Béatrice Vernaudon, a former member of the French National Assembly who lost her seat in June 2007, contested the seats. Former French Polynesian President Gaston Flosse ran for his Tahoeraa Huiraatira Party and teamed up with Richard Tuheiava, a member of the pro-independence party Union for Democracy.

== System ==
=== Electoral college ===
For the 114 seats up for election, the electoral college was composed of 50,720 elected officials (49,602 in metropolitan France). Of these, 48,453 were local councillors, 178 were MPs, 765 were regional councillors and 1,504 were general councillors.

=== Election ===
- Departments with 1 to 3 senators: Two-round system, using the same system as legislative elections.
- Departments with 4 or more senators: Proportional representation, highest averages method, no Panachage or preferential voting.

== Result ==
Parties and coalitions	Abbr.	2004	a	2008	±	2011	±
Union for a Popular Movement (Union pour un mouvement populaire)	UMP	159	56	151	–8	132	–19
Centrist Union-UDF (Union centriste–Union pour la démocratie française)	UC-UDF	30	4	29	–1	31	+2
Socialist Party (Parti socialiste)	PS	95	29	116	+21	131	+15
Communist, Republican and Citizen (Communiste, républicain, et citoyen)	CRC	23	3	23	+0	21	–2
Europe Écologie–The Greens (Europe Écologie–Les Verts)	VEC	0	+0	0	+0	10	+10
European Democratic and Social Rally (Rassemblement démocratique et social européen)	RDSE	17	8	17	+0	16	–1
Total UMP, UC-UDF and one RDSE (Right)		189	60	180	–9	164	–16
Total "Presidential Majority" PS, CRC, VEC and all but one RDSE (Left)		118	32	139	+21	177	+38
Non-Inscrits	NI	6	1	7	+1	7	+0
Total		331	114	343	+12	348	+5
a - Seats up for election (Serie A); Source: Public Senat
