= Leader of the Opposition in the Senate (France) =

De facto position in the Senate of France

- Chef de l'opposition au Sénat
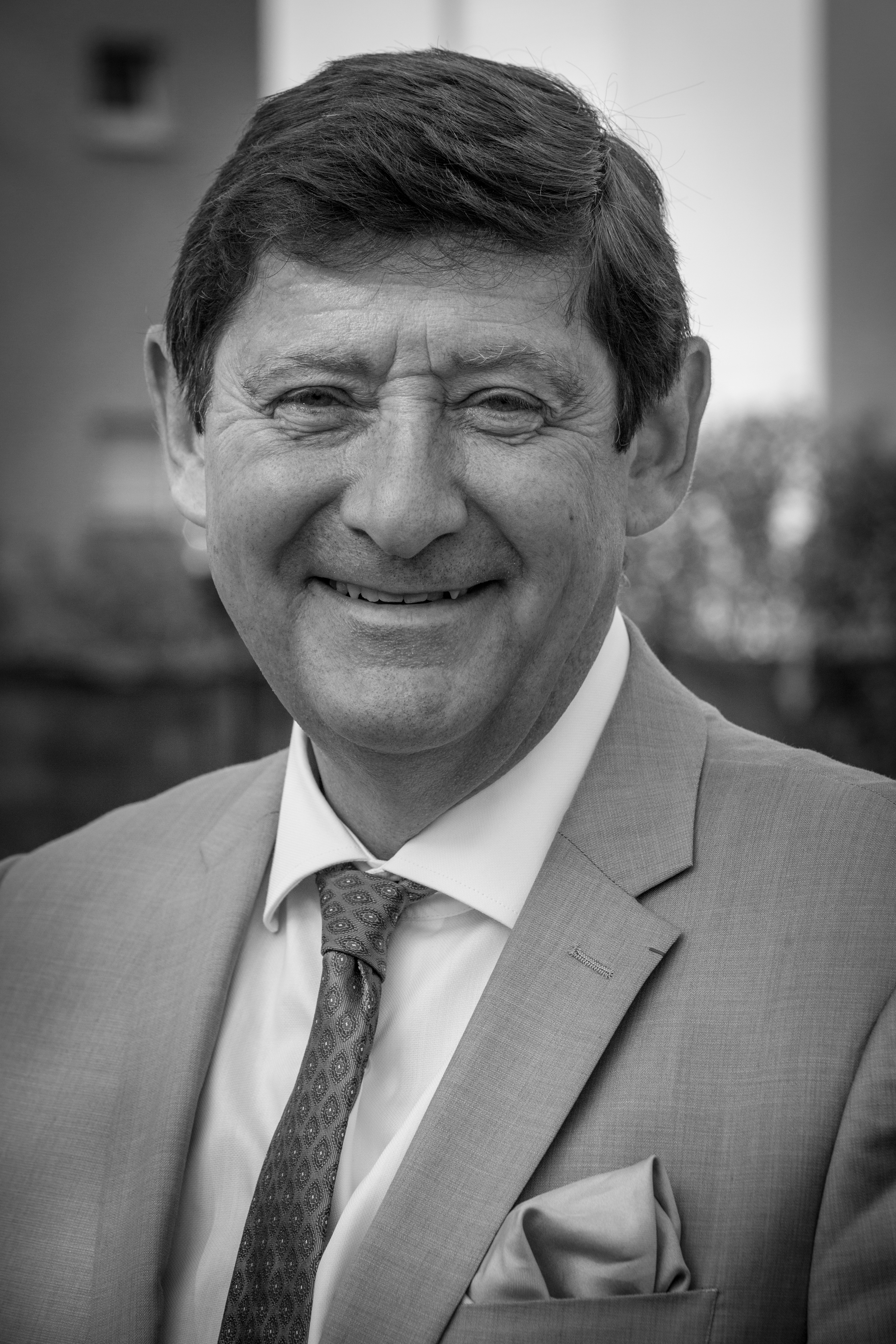
- Incumbent; Patrick Kanner since 23 January 2018
- Style: The President
- Residence: None
- Term length: 3 years
- Inaugural holder: Antoine Courrière
- Formation: 28 April 1959

The Leader of the Opposition in the Senate (French: chef de l'opposition au Sénat) is the leader of the largest opposition group in the Senate of France. The status has no official recognition in the French Constitution. What is more, the ideological differences between groups in the Senate is smaller than as usual, as the powers of the Senate allow it, at best, to lengthen the time for a bill.

Following the 2011 Senate election and the victory of the Socialists, Jean-Claude Gaudin became the first right-wing Senate Opposition Leader under the Fifth Republic. Eight people have held the position since its establishment in 1959. The current officeholder is Patrick Kanner.

== List of Opposition Leaders under the Fifth Republic ==
Political parties: Socialist Party Union for a Popular Movement

Leader	Image	Took office	Left office	Political group	Notes
Antoine Courrière		28 April 1959	20 September 1974	SOC	Senator for Aude. Died in office.
Marcel Champeix		20 September 1974	1 October 1980	SOC	Senator for Corrèze. Not reelected to the Senate.
André Méric		1 October 1980	22 June 1988	SOC	Senator for Haute-Garonne. Resigned to join the Rocard government.
Claude Estier		22 June 1988	1 October 2004	SOC	Senator for Paris. Did not seek reelection to the Senate.
Jean-Pierre Bel		1 October 2004	1 October 2011	SOC	Senator for Ariège. Subsequently became President of the Senate.
Jean-Claude Gaudin		1 October 2011	1 October 2014	UMP	Senator for Bouches-du-Rhône.
Didier Guillaume		1 October 2014	23 January 2018	SOC	Senator for Drôme.
Patrick Kanner		23 January 2018	Incumbent	SOC	Senator for Nord.
