= Gérard Larcher =

French politician (born 1949)

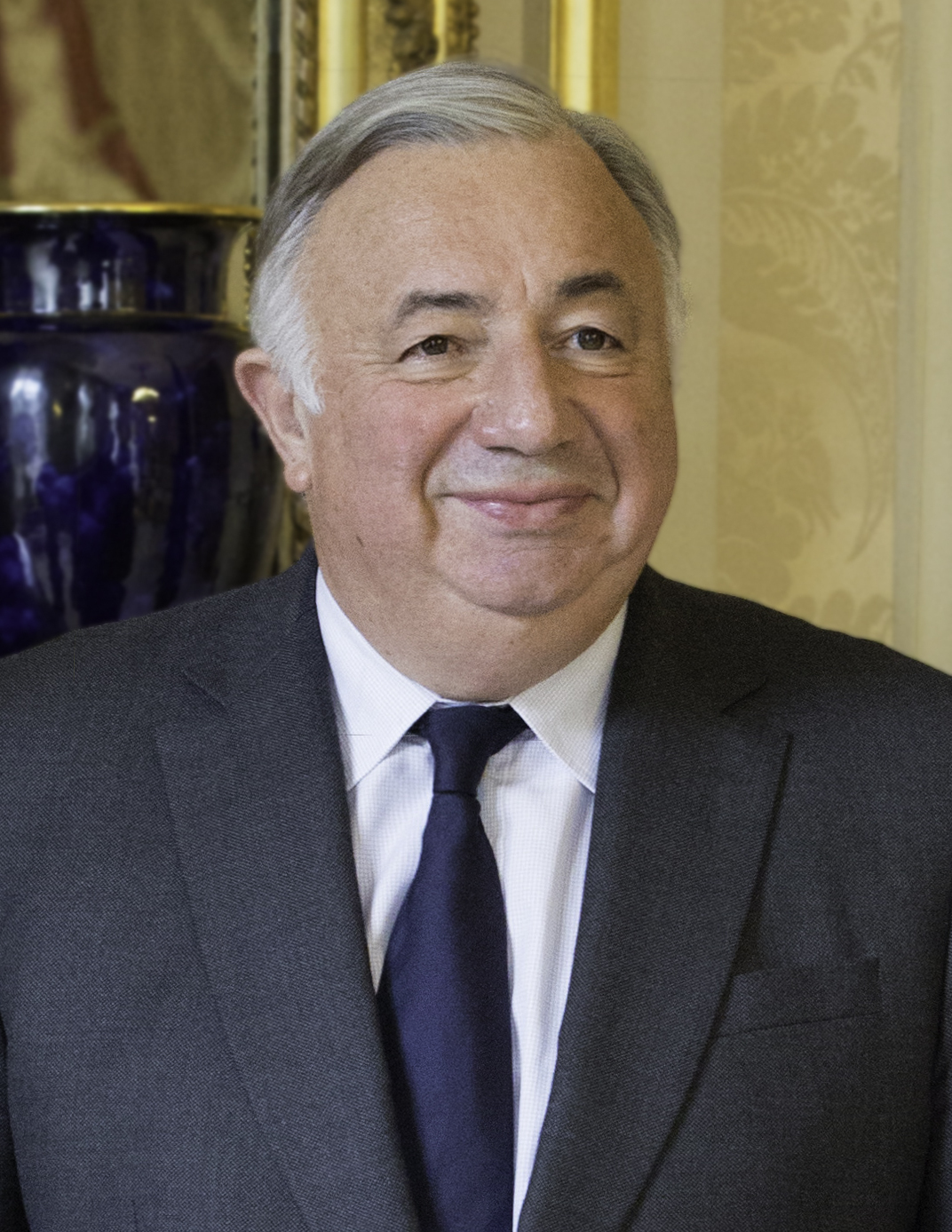
- Larcher in 2014

President of the French Senate
- Incumbent
- Assumed office 1 October 2014
- Preceded by: Jean-Pierre Bel
- In office 1 October 2008 – 30 September 2011
- Preceded by: Christian Poncelet
- Succeeded by: Jean-Pierre Bel

Member of the Senate
- Incumbent
- Assumed office 1 October 2007
- Preceded by: Adeline Gousseau
- Constituency: Yvelines
- In office 2 October 1986 – 30 April 2004
- Succeeded by: Alain Schmitz
- Constituency: Yvelines

Minister Delegate for Labour
- In office 31 March 2004 – 15 May 2007
- Prime Minister: Jean-Pierre Raffarin; Dominique de Villepin
- Preceded by: Position established
- Succeeded by: Position abolished

Mayor of Rambouillet
- In office 18 June 2007 – 4 April 2014
- Preceded by: Jean-Frédéric Poisson
- Succeeded by: Marc Robert
- In office 18 March 1983 – 7 July 2004
- Preceded by: Jacqueline Thome-Patenôtre
- Succeeded by: Jean-Frédéric Poisson

Personal details
- Born: Gérard Philippe René André Larcher; 14 September 1949 (age 76) Flers, France
- Party: The Republicans (2015–present)
- Other political affiliations: RPR (1976–2002); UMP (2002–2015); LR (2015- )
- Spouse: Christine Weiss
- Children: 3
- Profession: Veterinarian

Gérard Philippe René André Larcher (French pronunciation: [ʒeʁaʁ filip ʁəne ɑ̃dʁe laʁʃe]; born 14 September 1949) is a French politician serving as president of the Senate since 2014, previously holding the office from 2008 to 2011. A member of The Republicans, he has been a Senator for the Yvelines department since 1986, with an interruption between 2004 and 2007, when he was Minister for Employment, Labour and Professional Integration of Young People under President Jacques Chirac. Larcher also served as mayor of Rambouillet from 1983 to 2004 and again from 2007 until 2014.

== Early life and education ==
Larcher was born in Flers, Orne to a Roman Catholic family. He is the son of Philippe Larcher, director of a textile factory and former Mayor of Saint-Michel-des-Andaines, a small town in Orne.

Upon his second marriage with Christine Weiss, a dentist, he converted to Protestantism. From this union were born three children: Aymeric, Dorothée and Charlotte. After he graduated from the National Veterinary School of Lyon (ENVL), Larcher worked from 1974 to 1979 in the France team of equestrian sports.

== Political career ==
=== Local mandates ===
In 1976, Larcher joined the movement of young Gaullists, because he admired Charles de Gaulle and supported the policy orientations of the founder of the Fifth Republic. In the 1983 municipal election, he was elected Mayor of Rambouillet, in Yvelines. Two years later, he was elected regional councillor of Île-de-France.

On 28 September 1986, for the first time, Larcher was elected to be Senator for Yvelines, under the banner of the Rally for the Republic (RPR). Aged 37, he was one of the youngest French Senators. Appointed Secretary of the Senate in 1989, he was re-elected as a Senator in 1995 and elected as Vice President of the Senate in 1997. In 2001, he was appointed as President of the Senate's Economic Affairs Commission.

=== Government minister ===
In March 2004, after the defeat of the right in regional elections, Larcher was appointed junior minister to the minister of social affairs in the cabinet of Jean-Pierre Raffarin. He retained his place in the government in June 2005, after the appointment of Dominique de Villepin as prime minister.

In May 2007, the new president, Nicolas Sarkozy, suggested Larcher enter the government of François Fillon as minister of agriculture, but Larcher declined and preferred to sit in the Senate. In the following months, he prepared his candidacy for President of the Senate, to succeed Christian Poncelet. On 31 July 2008, he was declared a candidate for the UMP primary to elect the president of the Senate, against former prime minister Jean-Pierre Raffarin. On 24 September, he was elected as the UMP's candidate for the presidency of the Senate with 78 votes, against 56 votes for Raffarin and 17 votes for Senator Philippe Marini.

=== President of the Senate ===
Larcher was elected as President of the Senate on 1 October 2008, receiving 173 votes against 134 votes for Socialist candidate Jean-Pierre Bel.

The left won a Senate majority in the September 2011 Senate election, and Jean-Pierre Bel was elected as President of the Senate on 1 October 2011. He received 179 votes against 134 votes for Larcher, who was the right's candidate; a centrist, Valerie Letard, received 29 votes.

After the victory of the right in September 2014 Senate elections, Larcher was again nominated for the post of President of the Senate by members of the UMP group, and he was elected as President of the Senate on 1 October 2014.

== Overview ==
Governmental function

- Minister Delegate for Labor Relations : 2004-2005
- Minister Delegate for Employment, Labor and for Employability of young : 2005-2007

Senate mandates

Senate of France

- Senator of Yvelines : 1986-2004
- Vice President of the Senate : 1997-2001
- Président of the Economic Affairs Commission in the Senate : 2001-2004
- Senator of Yvelines : 2004
- Senator of Yvelines : Since 2007
- President of the Senate of France : 2008-2011
- President of the Senate of France : Since 2014

Regional Council

- Regional councillor of Île-de-France : 1985-1992

Municipal Council

- Municipal councillor of Rambouillet : Since 1983
- Mayor of Rambouillet : 1983–2004
- Deputy Mayor of Rambouillet : 2004–2007
- Mayor of Rambouillet : 2007-2014

== Political positions ==
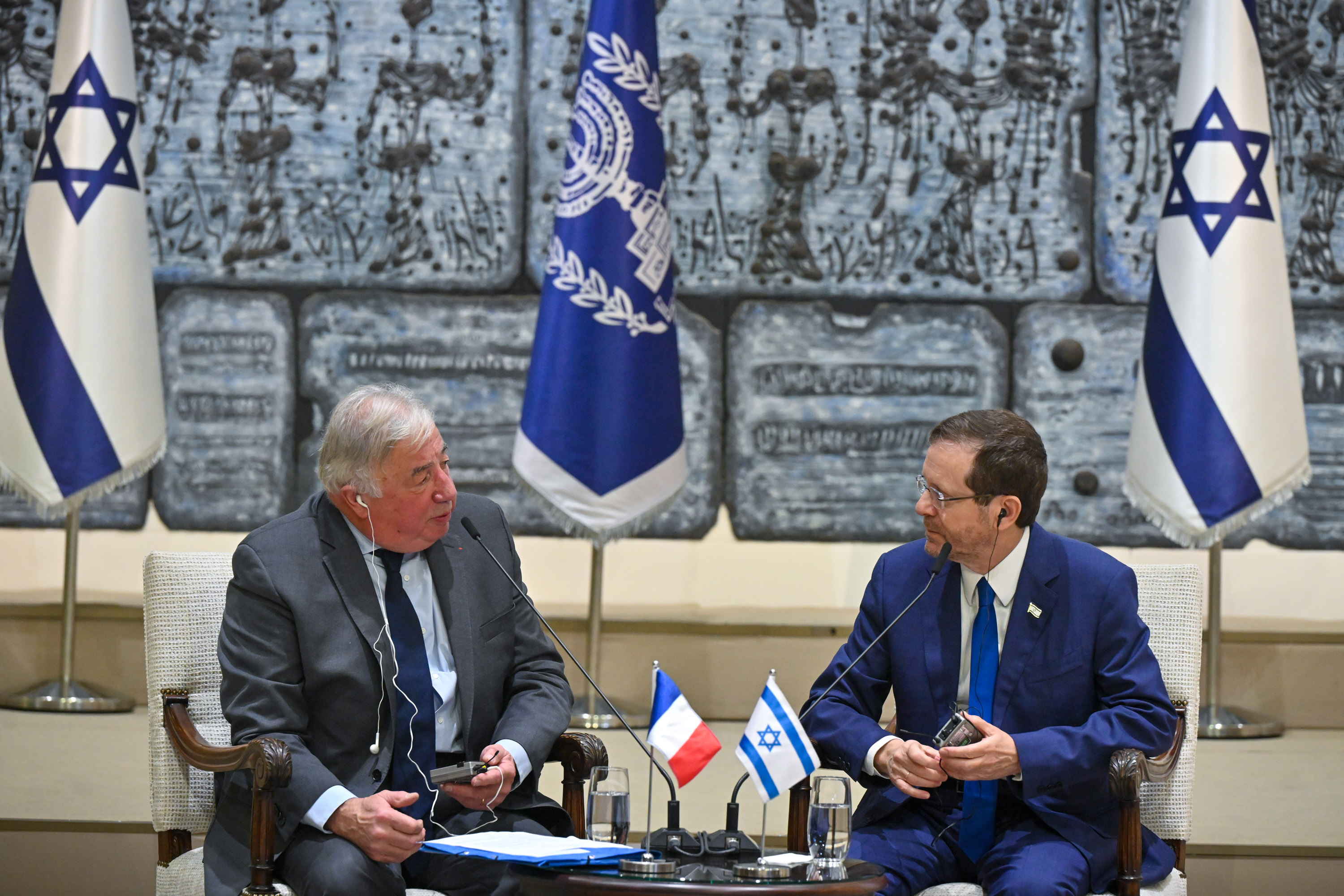
Larcher with Israeli President Isaac Herzog in Beit HaNassi, Jerusalem, Israel, 21 December 2023. In the background an Israeli relief made of basalt ash.

In 2019, Larcher argued that wearing the Islamic headscarf in the public space is "a freedom that he wants to defend" and considers Islam "compatible with the Republic, provided that it is neither radical nor political."

Ahead of the 2022 presidential elections, Larcher publicly declared his support for Xavier Bertrand as the Republicans’ candidate. Ahead of the party's 2022 and 2025 conventions, he endorsed Bruno Retailleau's candidacies as chairman.

Political offices
Preceded by Christian Poncelet	President of the French Senate; 2008–2011	Succeeded by Jean-Pierre Bel
Preceded by Jean-Pierre Bel	President of the French Senate; 2014–present	Incumbent
Order of precedence
Preceded by Sébastien Lecornu as Prime Minister	Order of precedence of France; President of the Senate	Succeeded by Yaël Braun-Pivet as President of the National Assembly
