= Senate (France) =

Upper house of the French Parliament

Coordinates: 48°50′54″N 2°20′14″E

Senate Sénat
- 21st Senate of the (Fifth) Republic

Type
- Type: Upper house of the French Parliament

History
- Founded: 4 October 1958; 68 years ago
- Preceded by: Council of the Republic (Fourth Republic)
- New session started: 2 October 2023; 3 years ago

Leadership
- President: Gérard Larcher, LR since 1 October 2014

Structure
- Seats: 348
- Political groups: Senate Majority (236): LR (124); UC (63); RDSE (18); RDPI (16); LIRT (15); Senate Opposition (112): SER (62); CRCE-K (18); GEST (15); UNT (15); RASNAG (2)
- Length of term: 6 years

Elections
- Voting system: Indirect election
- First election: 26 April 1959
- Last election: 27 September 2026
- Next election: 27 September 2029

Meeting place
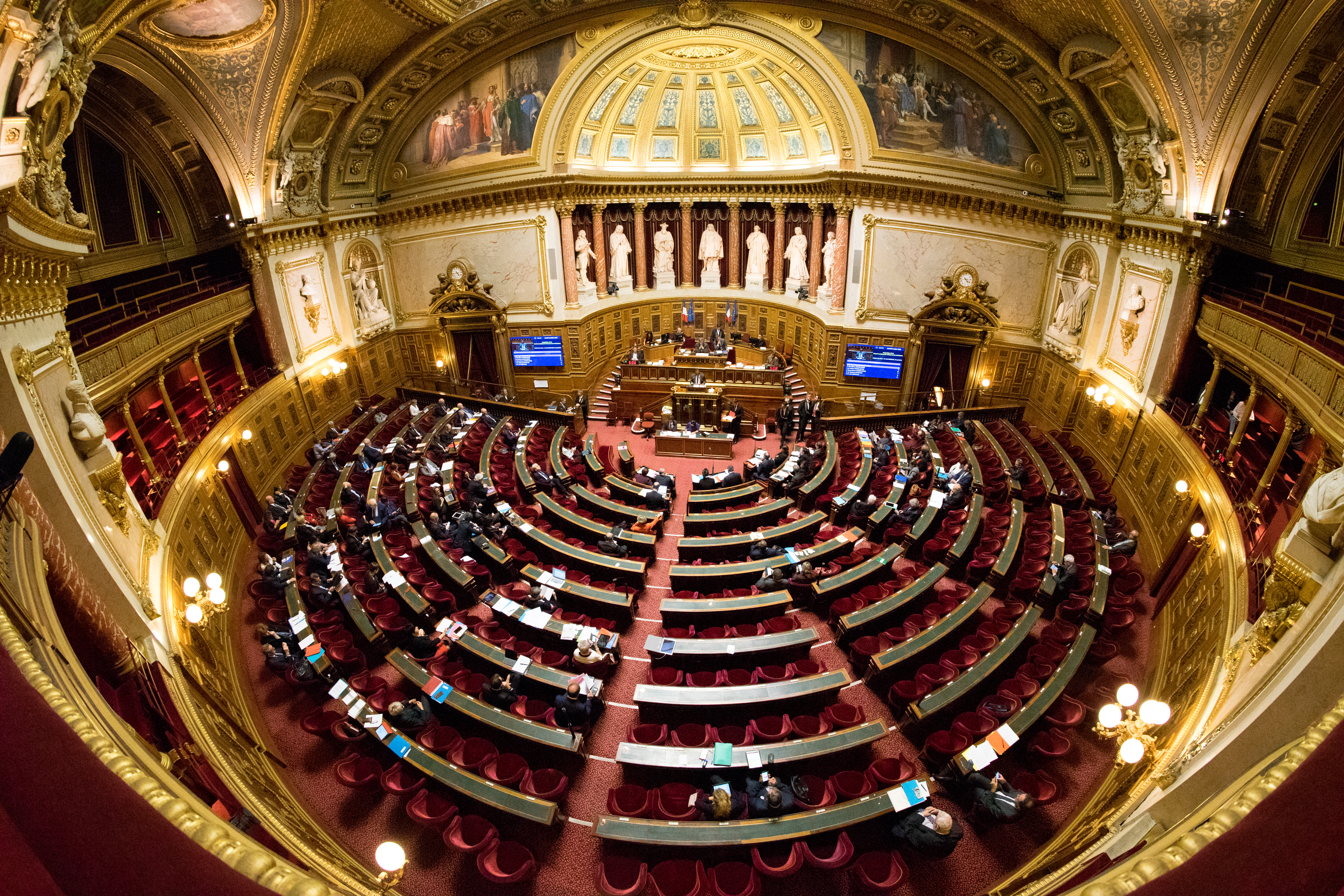
- Salle des Séances; Luxembourg Palace; Paris, French Republic

Website
- www.senat.fr

Constitution
- Constitution of 4 October 1958

Rules
- Standing Orders of the Senate (English)

The Senate (French: Sénat, [sena]) is the upper house of the French Parliament, with the lower house being the National Assembly, the two houses constituting the legislature of France. It is made up of 348 senators (sénateurs and sénatrices) (Note: Masculine and feminine. Pronounced [senatœʁ] and [senatʁis] respectively. Singular: sénateur and sénatrice; identical pronunciation as their respective plural.) elected by part of the country's local councillors in indirect elections. Senators have six-year terms, with half of the seats up for election every three years. They represent France's departments (328), (Note: Including the five overseas departments: Guadeloupe, French Guiana, Martinique, Réunion and Mayotte.) overseas collectivities (8) (Note: Saint Barthélemy, Saint Martin, Saint Pierre and Miquelon, Wallis and Futuna, French Polynesia and New Caledonia.) and citizens abroad (12). (Note: French citizens living abroad elect representatives who in turn vote for their senators. Six senators are elected every three years.)

Senators' mode of election varies upon their constituency's population size: in the less populated constituencies (one or two seats), they are elected individually, whereas in more populated ones (three seats or more), they are elected on lists. It is common for senators to hold dual mandates, such as in a regional council or departmental council.

The Senate enjoys less prominence than the National Assembly, which is elected on direct universal ballot and upon the majority of which the Government relies: in case of disagreement, the Assembly can in many cases have the last word, although the Senate keeps a role in some key procedures, such as constitutional amendments. However, following the 2024 snap legislative election and the ensuing political fragmentation in the Assembly, the newly-outed Barnier government held a working majority in the Senate but not in the Assembly, a first under the Fifth Republic, marking "a form of strengthening of the Senate".

Bicameralism was introduced in France amid the French Revolution in 1795; as in many countries, it assigned the upper chamber with the role of moderating the lower, although for a long time as an ally of the executive. The present selection mode of the Senate dates back to the start of the Third Republic, when it was turned into what Léon Gambetta famously called a "grand council of the communes of France". Over time, it developed a sense of independence as a "guardian of the institutions" and "guardian of liberties", favoured by the fact that senators are on average older than deputies in the Assembly, joining the Senate in the later part of their career. Debates in the Senate tend to be less tense and generally receive less media coverage. As a result of its election relying on what is often summed up as rural mayors, it has had a right-wing majority since 1958, with only a three-year exception in 2011–2014.

The President of the Senate is to step in as acting President of France in case of an incapacitation or a vacancy, which last happened in 1974. The officeholder also appoints three members of the Constitutional Council. Since 2014, Gérard Larcher has been President of the Senate.

The Senate is housed inside the Luxembourg Palace in the 6th arrondissement of Paris. Like the National Assembly, it is guarded by Republican Guards. In front of the building lies the Senate's garden, the Jardin du Luxembourg, open to the public.

== History ==
France's first experience with an upper house was under the Directory from 1795 to 1799, when the Council of Ancients was the upper chamber. There were Senates in both the First and Second Empires (the former being known as the Sénat conservateur, the latter as the French Senate), but these were only nominally legislative bodies – technically they were not legislative, but rather advisory bodies on the model of the Roman Senate.

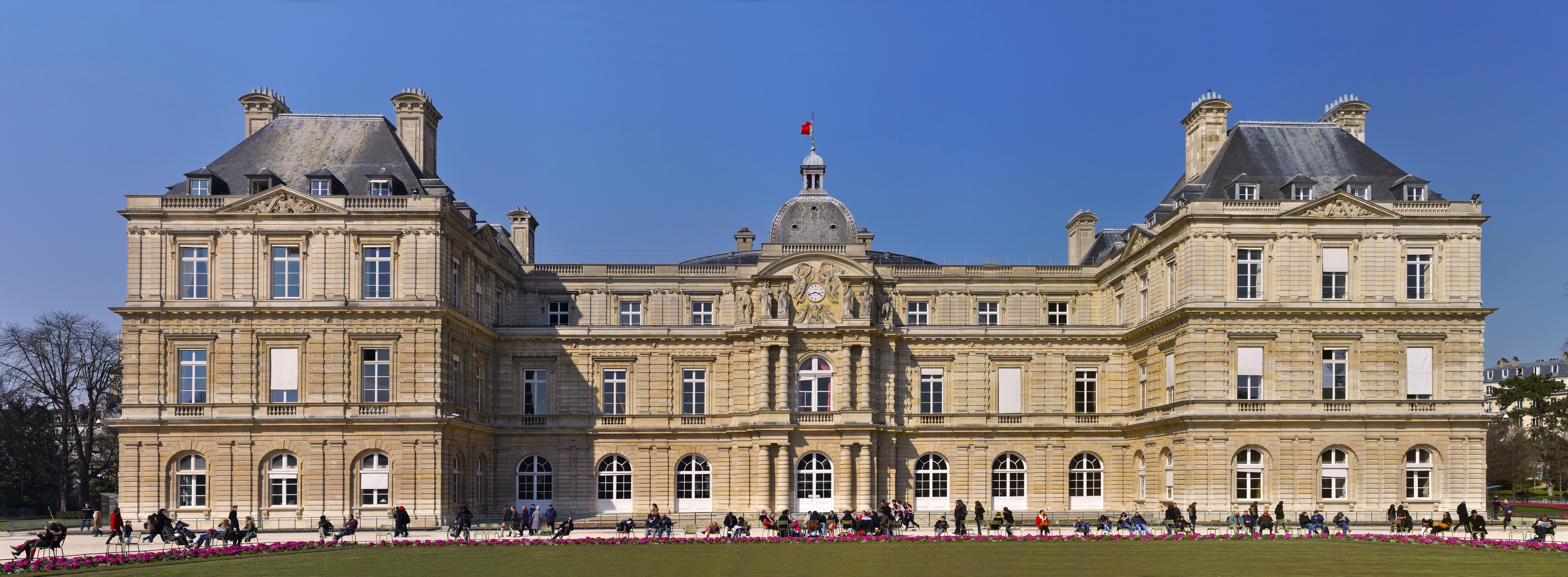
The Luxembourg Palace in Paris, where the Senate meets

With the Restoration in 1814, a new Chamber of Peers was created, on the model of the British House of Lords. At first it contained hereditary peers, but following the July Revolution of 1830, it became a body whose members were appointed for life. The Second Republic returned to a unicameral system after 1848, but soon after the establishment of the Second Empire in 1852, a Senate was established as the upper chamber. In the Fourth Republic, the Senate was replaced by the Council of the Republic, but its function was largely the same. With the new Constitution of the Fifth Republic which came into force on 4 October 1958, the older name of Senate was restored.

In 2011, the Socialist Party won control of the Senate for the first time since the foundation of the Fifth Republic. In 2014, the centre-right Gaullists and their allies won back the control of the Senate; they retained their majority in 2017.

== Powers ==
Under the Constitution of France, the Senate has nearly the same powers as the National Assembly. Bills may be submitted by the government (projets de loi) or by either house of Parliament (propositions de loi). Because both houses may amend the bill, it may take several readings to reach an agreement between the National Assembly and the Senate. When the Senate and the National Assembly cannot agree on a bill, the administration can decide, after a procedure called commission mixte paritaire, to give the final decision to the National Assembly, whose majority is normally on the government's side, but as regarding the constitutional laws the administration must have the Senate's agreement. This does not happen frequently; usually the two houses eventually agree on the bill, or the administration decides to withdraw it. This power however gives the National Assembly a prominent role in the law-making process, especially since the administration is necessarily of the same side as the Assembly, for the Assembly can dismiss the administration through a motion of censure.

The power to pass a vote of censure, or vote of no confidence, is limited. As was the case in the Fourth Republic's constitution, new cabinets do not have to receive a vote of confidence. Also, a vote of censure can occur only after 10 per cent of the members sign a petition; if rejected, those members that signed cannot sign another petition until that session of Parliament has ended. If the petition gets the required support, a vote of censure must gain an absolute majority of all members, not just those voting. If the Assembly and the Senate have politically distinct majorities, the Assembly will in most cases prevail; open conflict between the two houses is uncommon.

As per article 24 of the Constitution, the Senate is the representative of the territories and defends the local elected officials. The Senate also serves to monitor the administration's actions by publishing many reports each year on various topics.

== Composition ==
Until September 2004, the Senate had 321 members, each elected to serve for a nine-year term. In that month, the term was reduced to six years, while – to reflect a growth in the country's population – the number of senators was set to increase progressively, to reach 348 by 2011. Senators had been elected in thirds every three years; this was also changed to one half of their number every three years.

=== President ===
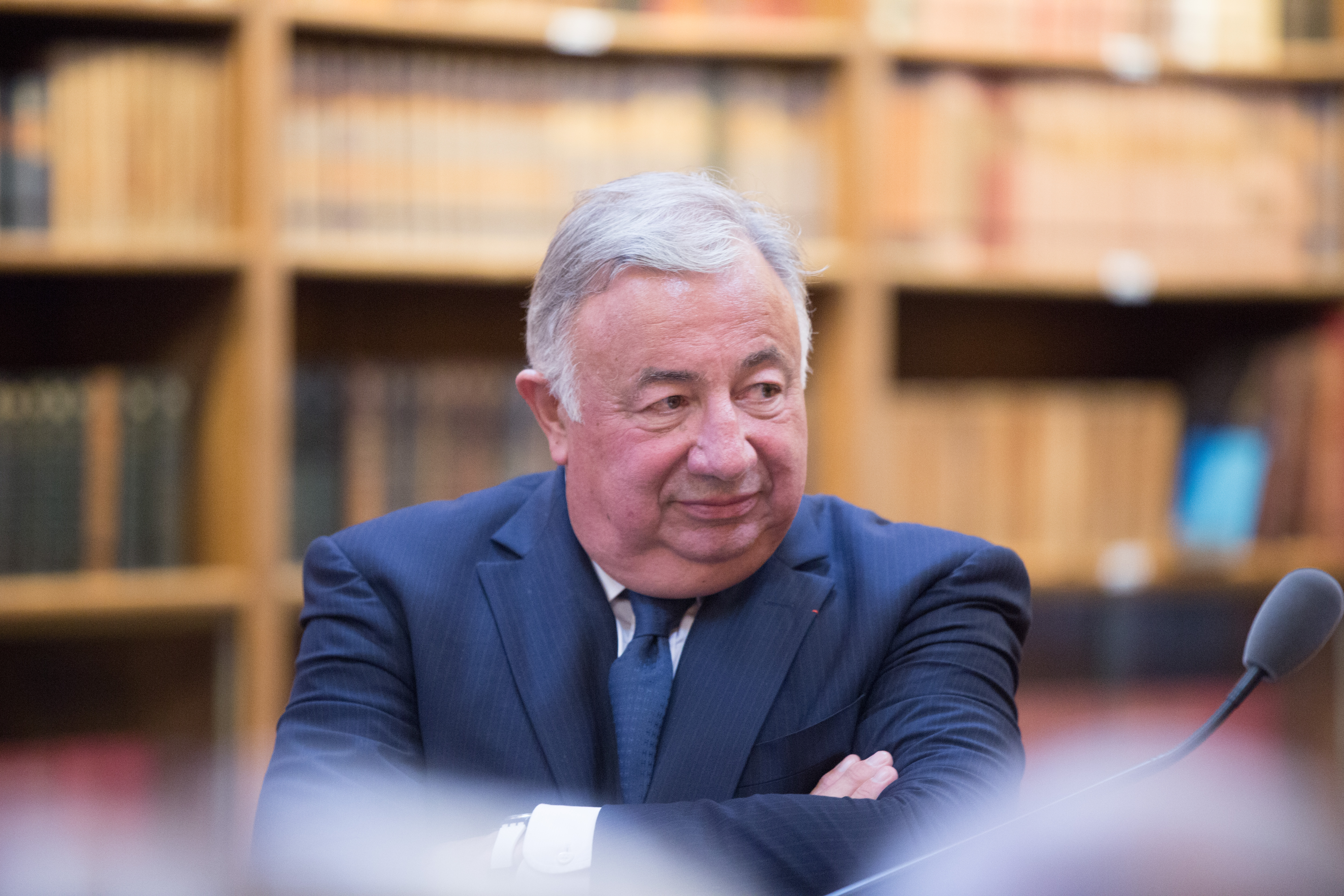
Gérard Larcher has been President of the Senate since 2014.

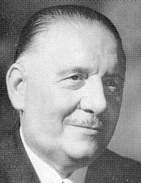
Then-Senate President Alain Poher served as Acting President of France twice: in 1969 and 1974.

The president of the Senate is elected by senators from among their members. The current incumbent is Gérard Larcher. The President of the Senate is, under the Constitution of the Fifth Republic, first in the line of succession—in case of death, resignation or removal from office (only for health reasons)—to the presidency of the French Republic, becoming Acting President of the Republic until a new election can be held. This happened twice for Alain Poher—once at the resignation of Charles de Gaulle and once at the death of Georges Pompidou.

The President of the Senate also has the right to designate three of the nine members of the Constitutional Council, serving for nine years.

=== Election ===
Senators are elected indirectly by approximately 150,000 officials, known as the grands électeurs, including regional councillors, department councillors, mayors, municipal councillors in large communes, as well as members of the National Assembly. However, 90% of the electors are delegates appointed by councillors. This system introduces a bias in the composition of the Senate favoring rural areas. As a consequence, while the political majority changes frequently in the National Assembly, the Senate has remained politically right, with one brief exception (2011–2014), since the foundation of the Fifth Republic, much to the displeasure of the Socialists.

This has spurred controversy, especially after the 2008 election in which the Socialist Party, despite controlling all but two of France's regions, a majority of departments, as well as communes representing more than 50% of the population, still failed to achieve a majority in the Senate. The Senate has also been accused of being a "refuge" for politicians that have lost their seats in the National Assembly. The left, led by the Socialist Party, gained control of the Senate for the first time since 1958 during the 2011 election, leading to the election of Jean-Pierre Bel at its presidency. This proved a short-lived win, as the right, led by the Union for a Popular Movement, regained the Senate three years later.

=== Parliamentary groups ===
Composition of the Senate as of 4 March 2024
Parliamentary group		Members	Associated	Attached	Total	President
REP	Senate Republicans	99	20	13	132	Bruno Retailleau
SER	Socialist	64	0	0	64	Patrick Kanner
UC	Centrist Union	50	4	2	56	Hervé Marseille
RDPI	Rally of Democrats, Progressive and Independent	20	2	0	22	François Patriat
CRCE-K	Communist, Republican, Citizen and Ecologist	18	0	0	18	Cécile Cukierman
LIRT	The Independents – Republic and Territories	18	0	0	18	Claude Malhuret
GEST	Ecologist	16	0	0	16	Guillaume Gontard
RDSE	European Democratic and Social Rally	16	0	0	15	Maryse Carrère
RASNAG	Administrative meeting of senators not appearing on the list of any group	5	–	–	5	Christopher Szczurek (delegate)
Vacant seat					1	

== Criticism ==
As an indirectly elected house, the Senate is often criticised by political parties such as La France Insoumise on the left and the National Rally on the right as not being sufficiently popularly representative. Although both La France Insoumise and the National Rally enjoy significant representation in the National Assembly, they are far less represented in the Senate, as they do not have a large number of local councillors affiliated with them, who in turn elect the senators.

The left has historically opposed the very existence of a second chamber, while the right has defended it; controversies over the Senate's role are revived from time to time. The common phrase "a senator's pace" (un train de sénateur) mocks the upper house's perceived slow rhythm and readiness to let new legislation die.

== See also ==
- Congress of the French Parliament
- List of presidents of the Senate of France
- List of senators of France by department
- Leader of the Opposition in the Senate (France)
- Politics of France
- Senator for life (France)
- Women in the French Senate
