= Rally the Centrists =

French political association

Rally the Centrists (French: Rassembler les centristes) is a French political association founded on July 16, 2008 by Jean Arthuis, a centrist Senator of Mayenne. The association unites elected officials and activists of centrist political ideology, most of which used to be members of the Union for French Democracy (UDF). The association's goal is to prepare the creation of a new centrist political party which would unite all the centrist forces, currently divided between parties such as the Democratic Movement, New Centre, Radical Party, Civic Alliance for Democracy in Europe.

== Creation ==
Upon the dissolution of the UDF into the MoDem in 2007, a number of UDF officials, including Arthuis, were skeptical about the new party. However, they at first joined the MoDem, participating in the Villepinte Congress, but they later distanced themselves from the independent strategy of the MoDem's President François Bayrou. This came to a climax following the MoDem's poor showing in the municipal and cantonal elections in March 2008.

On May 21, 2008, Arthuis and Thierry Cornillet (MoDem MEP who has since joined the Radical Party) published a petition signed by 17 Centrist Union Senators, one deputy and four MEPs.

== Members ==
Since the organization is not a political party, signatories may opt to remain members of their respective parties.

- Senators: Nicolas About (MoDem), Jean Arthuis, Claude Biwer (NC), Jean Boyer (NC), Marcel Deneux, Yves Détraigne (MoDem), Muguette Dini, Françoise Férat (MoDem), Christian Gaudin, Adrien Giraud (MoDem), Joseph Kergueris, Jean-Claude Merceron, Catherine Morin-Desailly (NC), Philippe Nogrix (former Senator), Anne-Marie Payet, André Vallet (former Senator), François Zocchetto
- Deputies: Thierry Benoit
- MEPs: Thierry Cornillet (ex-MoDem-Radical); Jean-Marie Cavada, Claire Gibault, Janelly Fourtou (ACDE)

Michel Mercier, former President of the Centrist Union group and now Minister of Agriculture, was also a signatory. According to Laurent de Boissieu, a political journalist, as of April 16, 2009, the organization included 16 Senators; of which 6 were members of the MoDem, 4 of the NC and 6 were members of neither of these parties.

== Evolution into a political party ==
On January 31, 2009, at the association's executive team meeting, the members re-affirmed their desire to transform the association into a political party.

The newspaper Ouest France said on April 7, 2009 said that Arthuis wanted to run candidates in upcoming regional, cantonal and Senate elections. In a May 2009 by-election in the canton of Poissy-Sud, the organization ran a candidate who obtained 2.93% of the vote, last place.

Finally, the Centrist Alliance emerged as a political party on June 27, 2009. It has, however, been slow to get off the ground.
