= Civic Alliance for Democracy in Europe =

Political party in France

The Civic Alliance for Democracy in Europe (Alliance Citoyenne pour la Démocratie en Europe, ACDE) is a liberal political party in France.

It was launched in January 2008 by Jean-Marie Cavada, Claire Gibault and Janelly Fourtou, three MEPs elected for Union for French Democracy. The goal of the party is to unite all those liberals who disagreed with the creation of the Democratic Movement and support President Nicolas Sarkozy.

The party was a member of the European Liberal Democrat and Reform Party for a few months until November 2009.

In the 2009 European Parliament election, Cavada was re-elected under the Union for a Popular Movement-New Centre etiquette, and seems to have become a member of the New Centre. Claire Gibault and Janelly Fourtou were not re-elected. The future of the organization is unknown.

== Leadership ==
- President: Jean-Marie Cavada (2008–...)
