= List of senators of Marne =

Location of Marne in France

Following is a list of senators of Marne, people who have represented the department of Marne in the Senate of France.

== Third Republic ==
Senators for Marne under the French Third Republic were:

- Alfred Boissonnet (1876–1879)
- Simon Dauphinot (1876–1888)
- Désiré Médéric Le Blond (1879–1886)
- Victor Diancourt (1886–1906)
- Camille Margaine (1888–1893)
- Alfred Poirrier (1894–1898)
- Ernest Vallé (1898–1920)
- Léon Bourgeois (1905–1925)
- Ernest Monfeuillart (1906–1933)
- Henry Merlin (1920–1940)
- Ernest Haudos (1925–1933)
- Jean Jacquy (1933–1940)
- Henri Patizel (1933–1940)

== Fourth Republic ==
Senators for Marne under the French Fourth Republic were:

- Alcide Benoît (1946–1948)
- Roger Menu (1946–1959)
- Marcel Lemaire (1948–1959)

== Fifth Republic ==
Senators for Marne under the French Fifth Republic were:

Period	Name	Party	Notes
1959-1965	Marcel Lemaire	National Centre of Independents and Peasants (CNIP)	
1959-1965	Roger Menu	Popular Republican Movement (MRP)	
1959-1965	Robert Soudant	Popular Republican Movement (MRP)	
1965-1974	Marcel Lemaire	National Centre of Independents and Peasants (CNIP)	
1965-1974	Roger Menu	Democratic Centre (CD)	Died in 1970
1965-1974	Jean Collery	Centrist Union of Democrats for Progress (UCDP)	Replaced Roger Menu in 1970
1965-1974	Robert Soudant	Democratic Centre (CD)	
1974-1983	Jean Collery	Centrist Union of Democrats for Progress (UCDP)	Died in 1976
1974-1983	Jean Amelin	Rally for the Republic (RPR)	Replaced Jean Collery
1974-1983	Marcel Lemaire	National Centre of Independents and Peasants (CNIP)	
1974-1983	Maurice Prévoteau	Centre, Democracy and Progress (CDP)	
1983-1992	Jean Amelin	Rally for the Republic (RPR)	
1983-1992	Jacques Machet	Union for French Democracy (UDF)	
1983-1992	Albert Vecten	Union for French Democracy (UDF)	
1992-2001	Jean Bernard	Rally for the Republic (RPR)	
1992-2001	Jacques Machet	Union for French Democracy (UDF)	
1992-2001	Albert Vecten	Union for French Democracy (UDF)	
2001-2011	Yves Détraigne	Union for French Democracy (UDF)	
2001-2011	Jean-Claude Étienne	Rally for the Republic (RPR)	Until 2010, when named to the CESE
2001-2011	Mireille Oudit	Union for a Popular Movement (UMP)	Replaced Jean-Claude Étienne
2001-2011	Françoise Férat	Union for French Democracy (UDF)	
2011-2017	Yves Détraigne	Union of Democrats and Independents (UDI)	
2011-2017	Françoise Férat	Union of Democrats and Independents (UDI)	
2011-2017	René-Paul Savary	Union for a Popular Movement (UMP)	
2017-2023	Yves Détraigne	Union of Democrats and Independents (UDI)	
2017-2023	Françoise Férat	Union of Democrats and Independents (UDI)	
2017-2023	René-Paul Savary	The Republicans (LR)	

== Sources ==
- Liste des anciens sénateurs de la IIIème République par circonscription (in French), Sénat de France
- Liste des anciens sénateurs de la IVème République par circonscription (in French), Sénat de France
- Liste des anciens sénateurs de la Vème République par circonscription (in French), Sénat de France
