= Ille-et-Vilaine's 6th constituency =

Constituency of the National Assembly of France

6th constituency of Ille-et-Vilaine
- inline Constituency of the National Assembly of France

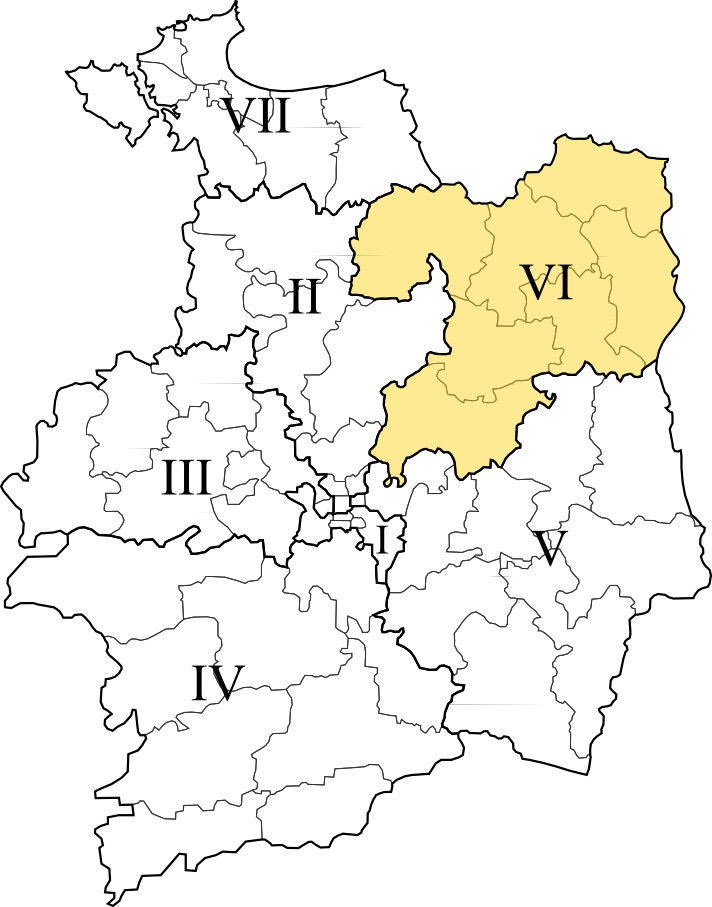
- Constituency in department

- Ille-et-Vilaine in France
- Deputy: Thierry Benoit; Horizons
- Department: Ille-et-Vilaine
- Cantons: (pre-2015) Antrain, Fougères-Nord, Fougères-Sud, Liffré, Louvigné-du-Désert, Saint-Aubin-du-Cormier, Saint-Brice-en-Coglès

The 6th constituency of Ille-et-Vilaine is a French legislative constituency in the Ille-et-Vilaine département. Like the other 576 French constituencies, it elects one MP using the two-round system, with a run-off if no candidate receives over 50% of the vote in the first round.

== Deputies ==
Election	Member	Party
1958	Georges Coudray	MRP
1962	Yvon Bourges	UNR
1967	Yvon Bourges	UDR
1968	Yvon Bourges	UDR
1973	Yvon Bourges	UDR
1978	Yvon Bourges	RPR
1981	Jean Hamelin	RPR
1986	Proportional representation - no election by constituency	
1988	Michel Cointat	RPR
1993	Marie-Thérèse Boisseau	UDF
1997	Marie-Thérèse Boisseau	UDF
2002	Marie-Thérèse Boisseau	UMP
2007	Thierry Benoit	MoDem
2007	Thierry Benoit	New Centre
2012	Thierry Benoit	AC
2017	Thierry Benoit	UDI
2022	Thierry Benoit	Horizons

== Election results ==
=== 2024 ===
Candidate	Party	Alliance	First round			Second round		
Candidate	Party	Alliance	Votes	%	+/–	Votes	%	+/–
Thierry Benoit	HOR	Ensemble	26,968	41.81	-5.07	40,987	66.50	
Tangi Marion	RN		19,960	30.94	+14.34	20,652	33.50	
Elsa Lafaye	PCF	NFP	16,209	25.13	-0.50	withdrew		
Ludovic Hubert	LO		839	1.30	-0.16			
Pascal Thevenet	RES!		402	0.62	new			
Gilliatt De Staërck	DVG		131	0.20	new			
Votes			64,509	100.00			100.00	
Valid votes			64,059	97.47	-0.14	61,639	95.29	
Blank votes			1,141	1.72	+0.04	2,162	3.34	
Null votes			536	0.81	+0.10	888	1.37	
Turnout			66,186	73.01	+20.93	64,689	71.35	
Abstentions			24,462	26.99	-20.93	25,971	28.65	
Registered voters			90,648			90,660		
Result			HOR HOLD					

=== 2022 ===
Legislative Election 2022: Ille-et-Vilaine's 6th constituency
Party	Candidate	Votes	%	±%
HOR (Ensemble)	Thierry Benoit	21,513	46.88	+14.18
LFI (NUPÉS)	Hélène Mocquard	11,762	25.63	-0.72
RN	Gilles Pennelle	7,618	16.60	+5.27
LR (UDC)	Tangi Marion	1,825	3.98	−30.30
REC	Emilie Bechadergue	966	2.10	N/A
Others	N/A	2,208	4.81	
Turnout		45,892	52.08	−2.89
2nd round result
HOR (Ensemble)	Thierry Benoit	26,431	61.69	+19.69
LFI (NUPÉS)	Hélène Mocquard	16,413	38.31	N/A
Turnout		42,844	50.47	+1.68
HOR gain from UDI				

=== 2017 ===
Candidate	Label	First round		Second round	
Candidate	Label	Votes	%	Votes	%
Thierry Benoit	UDI	16,048	34.28	22,633	58.00
Nolwenn Vahé	REM	15,305	32.70	16,389	42.00
Gilles Pennelle	FN	5,303	11.33		
Hélène Mocquard	FI	4,701	10.04		
Benoît Montabone	PCF	3,525	7.53		
Sylvie Galode	ECO	587	1.25		
Marie-Élyse Dugué	REG	392	0.84		
Régis Douard	EXG	388	0.83		
Élisabeth de Brye	DVD	317	0.68		
Janek Decoopman	DIV	243	0.52		
Marie-Pierre Vedrenne	DIV	0	0.00		
Votes		46,809	100.00	39,022	100.00
Valid votes		46,809	97.94	39,022	91.99
Blank votes		668	1.40	2,372	5.59
Null votes		315	0.66	1,024	2.41
Turnout		47,792	54.97	42,418	48.79
Abstentions		39,157	45.03	44,530	51.21
Registered voters		86,949		86,948	
Source: Ministry of the Interior

=== 2012 ===
2012 legislative election in Ille-Et-Vilaine's 6th constituency
Candidate	Party	First round		Second round	
Candidate	Party	Votes	%	Votes	%
Thierry Benoit	AC	20,522	40.33%	26,071	51.28%
Louis Feuvrier	PS dissident	15,757	30.97%	24,771	48.72%
Agathe Remoue	EELV–PS	6,733	13.23%		
Elisabeth Drouin	FN	4,606	9.05%		
Jean-François Garnier	FG	1,759	3.46%		
Françoise Dubu		572	1.12%		
Thierry Derollez	DLR	530	1.04%		
Ludovic Hubert	LO	314	0.62%		
Jacques Dehergne		92	0.18%		
Valid votes		50,885	97.78%	50,842	97.18%
Spoilt and null votes		1,154	2.22%	1,478	2.82%
Votes cast / turnout		52,039	61.01%	52,320	61.35%
Abstentions		33,253	38.99%	32,966	38.65%
Registered voters		85,292	100.00%	85,286	100.00%

=== 2007 ===
Legislative Election 2007: Ille-et-Vilaine's 6th constituency
Party	Candidate	Votes	%	±%
UMP	Marie-Thérèse Boisseau	17,915	37.25	−12.68
MoDem	Thierry Benoit	9,720	20.21	N/A
LV	Marie-Pierre Rouger	9,100	18.92	+1.41
PRG	Jean Taillandier	4,531	9.42	−1.55
LCR	Francoise Dubu	1,669	3.47	+0.73
PCF	Maudez Le Berre	1,315	2.73	+0.28
FN	Dominique Drouin	1,044	2.17	−3.17
Others	N/A	2,798	-	−
Turnout		49,413	63.36	−3.47
2nd round result
MoDem	Thierry Benoit	21,534	55.09	N/A
UMP	Marie-Thérèse Boisseau	17,553	44.91	−19.19
Turnout		44,018	56.44	−3.48
MoDem gain from UMP				

=== 2002 ===
Legislative Election 2002: Ille-et-Vilaine's 6th constituency
Party	Candidate	Votes	%	±%
UMP	Marie-Thérèse Boisseau	24,060	49.93	N/A
LV	Marie-Pierre Rouger	8,436	17.51	+12.69
PRG	Jean Teillandier	5,284	10.97	N/A
FN	Patricia Beaudelot	2,571	5.34	−1.67
DVD	Pierre Renault*	2,495	5.18	N/A
LCR	Françoise Dubu	1,322	2.74	+1.08
PCF	Françoise Payen	1,182	2.45	−3.09
Others	N/A	2,835	-	−
Turnout		49,528	66.83	−3.90
2nd round result
UMP	Marie-Thérèse Boisseau	27,422	64.10	N/A
LV	Marie-Pierre Rouger	15,355	35.90	N/A
Turnout		44,409	59.92	−12.25
UMP gain from FD				

* RPR dissident

=== 1997 ===
Legislative Election 1997: Ille-et-Vilaine's 6th constituency
Party	Candidate	Votes	%	±%
FD (UDF)	Marie-Thérèse Boisseau	20,134	43.28	
PS	Clément Théaudin	13,008	27.96	
FN	Christian Ressort	3,261	7.01	
PCF	Jean-Claude Guillerm	2,579	5.54	
LV	Maurice Langlois	2,243	4.82	
LDI	Nicole Hebert	1,383	2.97	
GE	Deniel Mèrienne	1,019	2.19	
Others	N/A	2,897	-	
Turnout		50,022	70.73	
2nd round result
FD (UDF)	Marie-Thérèse Boisseau	26,791	55.79	
PS	Clément Théaudin	21,230	44.21	
Turnout		51,035	72.17	
FD hold				

=== 1993 ===
Legislative Election 1993: Ille-et-Vilaine 6th - 2nd round
Party	Candidate	Votes	%	±%
UDF	Marie-Thérèse Boisseau	27,471	59.40	
PS	Louis Feuvrier	18,778	40.60	
Turnout		49,740	70.84	
UDF gain from RPR		Swing		

== Sources ==
- INSEE's slip of this constituency: "Tableaux et Analyses de la sixième circonscrition d'Ille-et-Vilaine" (PDF) (in French).
- Liste of Ille-et-Vilaine's deputies from 1789: "Tous les députés du département d'Ille-et-Vilaine depuis 1789" (in French). Archived from the original on 30 September 2007.
- Official results of French elections from 1998: "Résultats électoraux officiels en France" (in French). Archived from the original on 20 December 2011.
