= Fourtou (surname) =

Fourtou is a French surname. Notable people with the surname include:

- Janelly Fourtou (born 1939), French member of the European Parliament
- Jean-René Fourtou (born 1939), French business executive
- Oscar Bardi de Fourtou (1836–1897), French politician
