= Albert Vecten =

French farmer and politician (1926–2023)

Member of the French Senate for Marne
- In office 25 September 1983 – 30 September 2001

President of the General Council of Marne
- In office 1982–2003
- Preceded by: Maurice Prévoteau
- Succeeded by: René-Paul Savary
- Constituency: Canton of Ville-en-Tardenois

Member of the General Council of Marne
- In office 1964–2004
- Preceded by: M. Mimin
- Succeeded by: Michel Caquot

Mayor of Muizon
- In office 1953–1989
- Succeeded by: Michel Caquot

Personal details
- Born: 16 February 1926 Billy-sur-Ourcq, France
- Died: 14 May 2023 (aged 97)
- Party: UDF
- Occupation: Farmer

Albert Vecten (16 February 1926 – 14 May 2023) was a French farmer and politician of the Union for French Democracy (UDF).

== Biography ==
Born in Billy-sur-Ourcq on 16 February 1926, Vecten grew up in a family of farmers with seven sisters and one brother. After starting his degree under the German occupation, he failed to complete his studies and instead returned to his family's farm. After marrying his wife, Bernadette, in Loupeigne, he opened a grain business in Muizon. He was elected Mayor in 1953, the youngest mayor in all of France at the time. He held this office for 36 years, serving until 1989. He notably implemented an industrial zone in the commune, and saw the population increase from 480 to 2255 inhabitants from 1962 to 1990. He also helped to start the Communauté de communes Champagne Vesle.

In 1964, Vecten was elected to the General Council of Marne to represent the Canton of Ville-en-Tardenois. In 1982, he was elected President of the General Council. In this post, he helped set toll road sticker costs to be the lowest in France, which attracted many rental car companies and transportation services. This led to a doubling of such revenue in the department between 1995 and 1997. In 1997, the sticker cost 278, as opposed to 600 francs in Cantal. In 1997, 184,500 new vehicles were registered in the department, up from 20,400 in 1995. Vecten claimed he was simply seeking an "administrative simplification", but the Ministry of Finance required rental cars to pay sticker prices from the department in which they were first rented.

Vecten supported the foundation of Europol'Agro, which aimed to put more focus into agriculture and farming in higher education. He also supported the development of the Châlons Vatry Airport. In 1983, he was elected to the Senate and joined the Centrist Union group. In 1992, he was re-elected under the UDF label. He did not seek re-election in 2001. In 2003, he stepped down as President of the General Council of Marne, and he was succeeded by René-Paul Savary. He did not seek re-election in 2004 and retired from politics.

Albert Vecten died on 14 May 2023, at the age of 97.

== Bibliography ==
- Qui pense encore au bien commun ?
