= Mithraic reliefs of Jort =

Bas-relief sculptures discovered in France

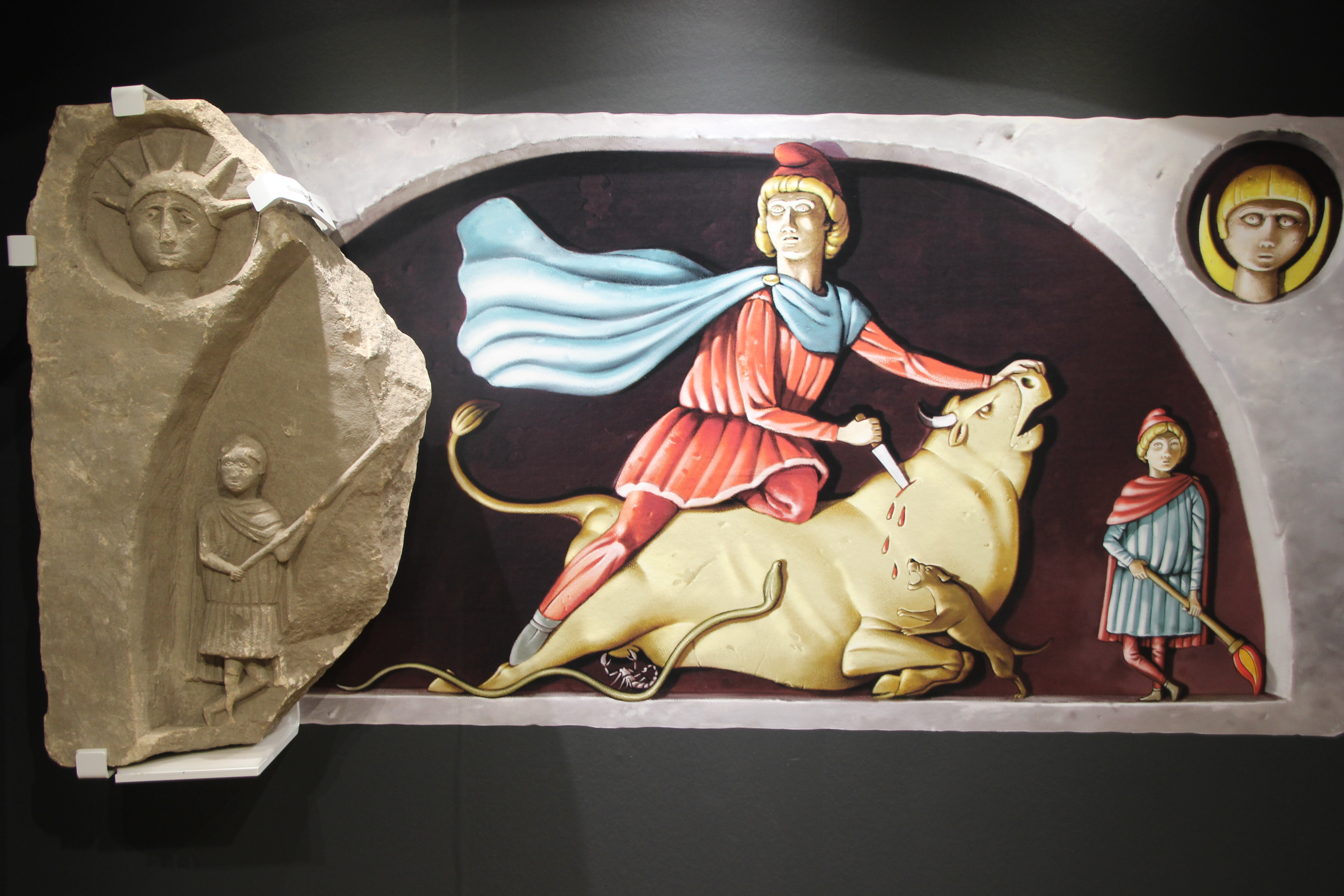
- Mithraic bas-relief of Jort
- Location: Mairie de Jort, Jort (Normandy, France)
- 48°58′21″N 0°04′49″W
- Owner: Ancient Rome

The Mithraic reliefs of Jort are bas-relief sculptures discovered in 2011 in the commune of Jort, Calvados department, Normandy region, France. The discovery was fortuitous, occurring during the public sanitation works. The reliefs have since been preserved in the town hall of the commune.

The so-called Eastern cults underwent significant development within the Roman Empire during various historical periods, particularly at the beginning of the Christian era. Mithra, initially an Indo-Iranian deity, was the son of Anahita. His cult experienced considerable growth within the Empire during the 2nd and 3rd centuries before being banned at the end of the 4th century by the Roman emperor Theodosius I.

Although the reliefs are incomplete and their iconography is relatively simple, they represent a unique and valuable source of information about the Mithraic cult in northwestern France.

== History ==
=== Ancient history of the site ===
Jort was a substantial settlement during the Roman era, a Gallo-Roman vicus situated on the Chemin Haussé, a Roman road connecting Vieux to Exmes.

Jort was a strategic location at the border between the Lexovii and the Viducasses. It was on the Lisieux-Avranches route, intersected with the road linking Vieux/Bayeux to Chartres. The archaeological evidence, in the form of stone blocks, was discovered on the old road leading to Exmes and then Sées.

The establishment of the litus saxonicum defense system saw the arrival of troops and Eastern cults in the region during the 3rd century.

At the level of microtoponymy, a field situated in the eastern portion of the commune was designated "La Ville" during the nineteenth century.

Map of the cities and capitals of the cities of the future Normandy in the High Roman Empire

Map of cities and capitals in the Late Roman Empire

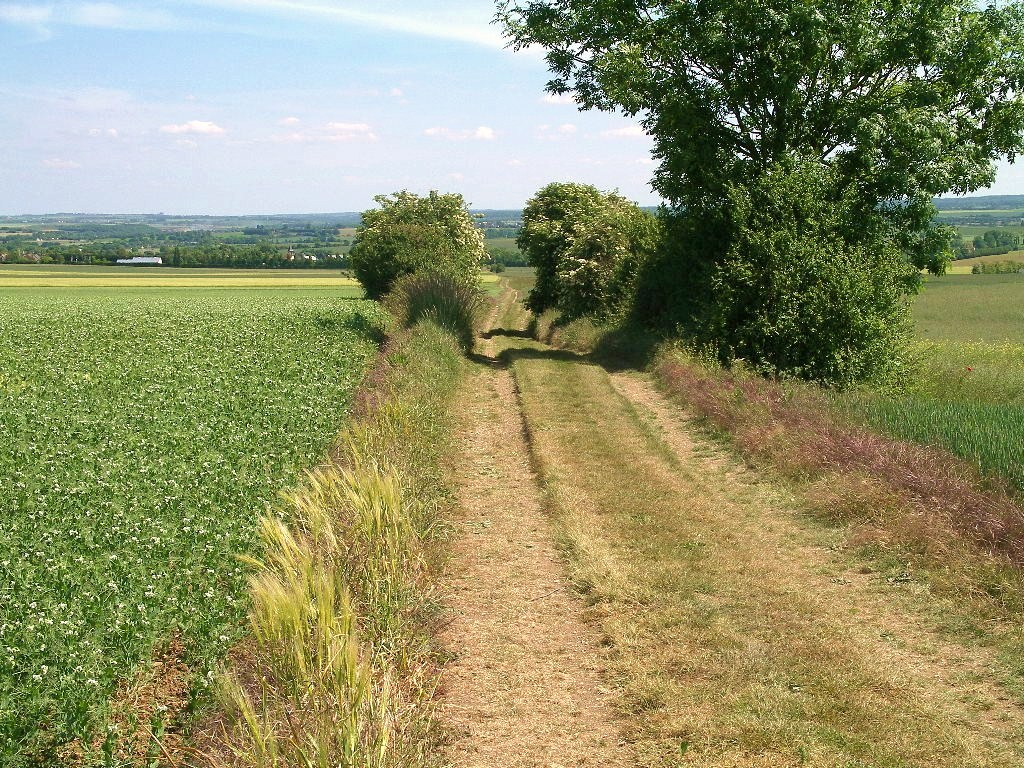
Chemin Haussé on the Caen plain

=== History of the discovery ===
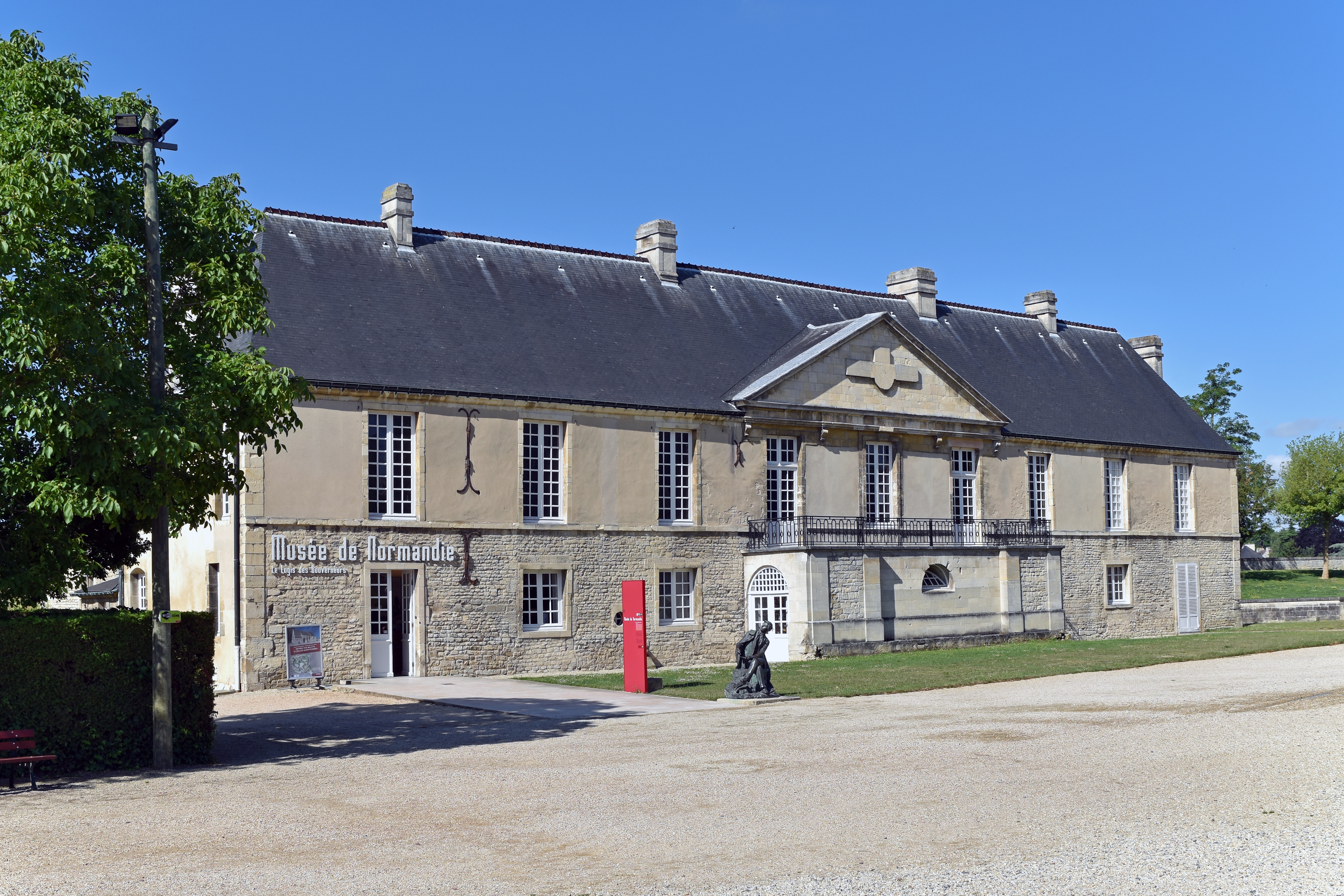
Normandy Museum in Caen, where the relief will be exhibited in 2018–2019

The initial archaeological discoveries were made in the 19th century. A comprehensive report was produced in the early second quarter of the 19th century, providing the basis for the extensive statistical analysis presented by Galeron. In 1834, the construction of a road led to the discovery of additional artifacts, which were soon followed by a series of excavations in the gardens. The blocks were subsequently found in the same "archaeologically rich" area.

The bas-reliefs were fortuitously unearthed during a collective sanitation operation in the small commune on Albert-Guillain Street, formerly designated as the "Chemin du haut", on February 22, 2011. The individual who discovered the blocks was the project manager, who had previously worked as an archaeologist for the Calvados general council. The blocks were briefly cleaned and the relevant municipal and state authorities were informed. No further blocks have been discovered, although the excavator operator claimed to have seen other blocks and masonry. Despite testimonies indicating that the blocks were discovered on the ground under a stone roadway, the archaeological context is partially known. However, it is in a context that is rich in ancient archaeological discoveries. The stratigraphic context rules out the possibility of a forger's creation.

Archaeological excavations were conducted on the site, situated within a spacious and refined private property on the street. The excavations revealed the remains of a Roman dwelling dating from the 1st to the 3rd century.

Subsequently, the relief was preserved in the town hall of the commune. It was included in the exhibition Vous avez dit barbares? at the Normandy Museum in Caen from 2018 to 2019.

== Description ==
The bas-reliefs are constructed from Caen stone, a material that suggests a local provenance. They display evidence of ancient and more recent destruction, which is believed to be linked to the discovery of the remains using excavation equipment.

Two limestone slabs were discovered. The initial block has been received in a state of incompleteness and alteration. The carved plaques, which may be described as "naive representations", were originally employed as a cornice at the advent of the common era.

=== Block No. 1 ===
The study of the articulation of the bas-relief has led to the proposition that it may have constituted a cornice or another architectural element from the Early Roman Empire. The relief did not exhibit any evidence of weathering. This initial relief was subsequently reworked into a "bas-relief with anthropomorphic figures".

The block in question probably originated from a funerary monument, and the sculpture was therefore carved on a previously used block.

The bas-relief, which originally measured 1.20 m by 0.685 m, depicted the sacrifice of a bull. However, it is now "very incomplete", with only the left part remaining. The surviving part is irregular in shape, measuring 0.684 m by 0.386 m on one side and 0.524 m by 0.230 m on another. Only a third of the sculpture has been preserved.

The remains permit identification through a bust in a medallion, 0.198 meters in diameter, which displays a head with coarse features and a radiated crown with six points. The relief is characterized by a strikingly naive quality. A standing figure, measuring 0.306 m in height, is depicted on the left side of the relief, holding a pole of uncertain purpose, the upper portion of which is missing. The legs are crossed, and the figure is clothed in a tunic and a cape fastened on the shoulder with a fibula. Despite the damage to the block, which makes interpretation challenging, this character is considered juvenile. The head is surrounded by a halo, which specialists in ancient sculpture interpret as related to the carving process rather than an indication of sanctity.

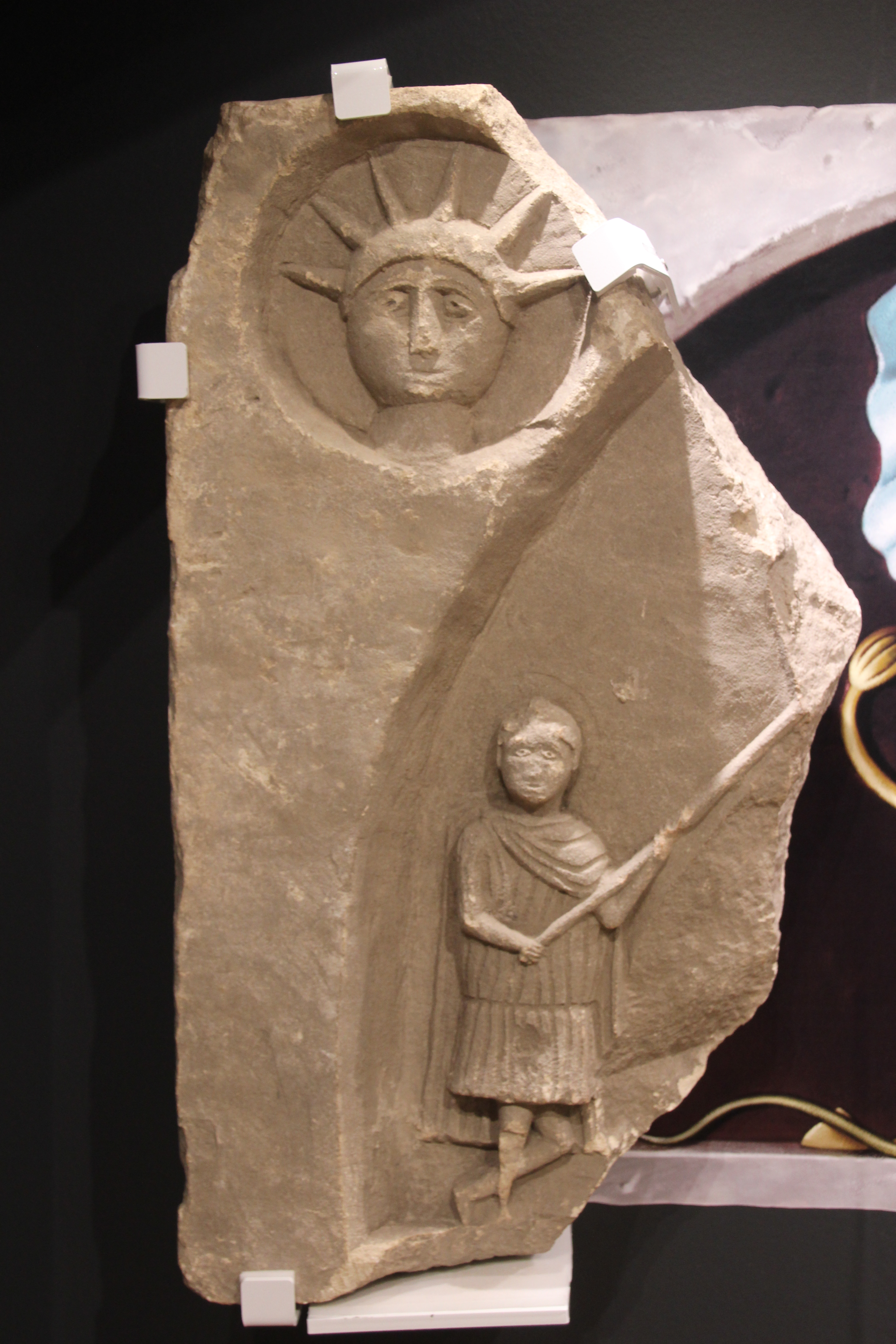
Block No. 1. Overview.

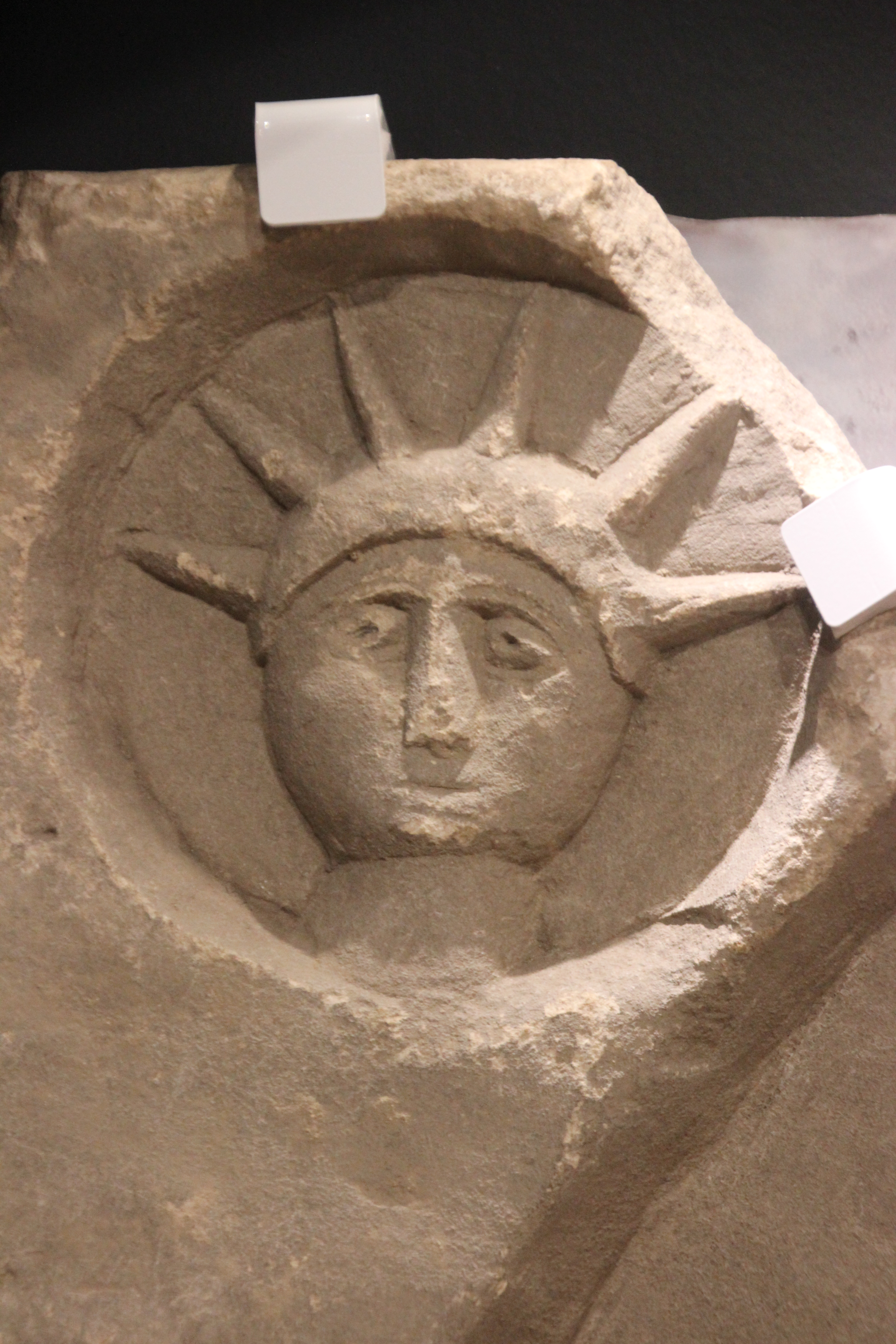
Detail of block No. 1, Sol

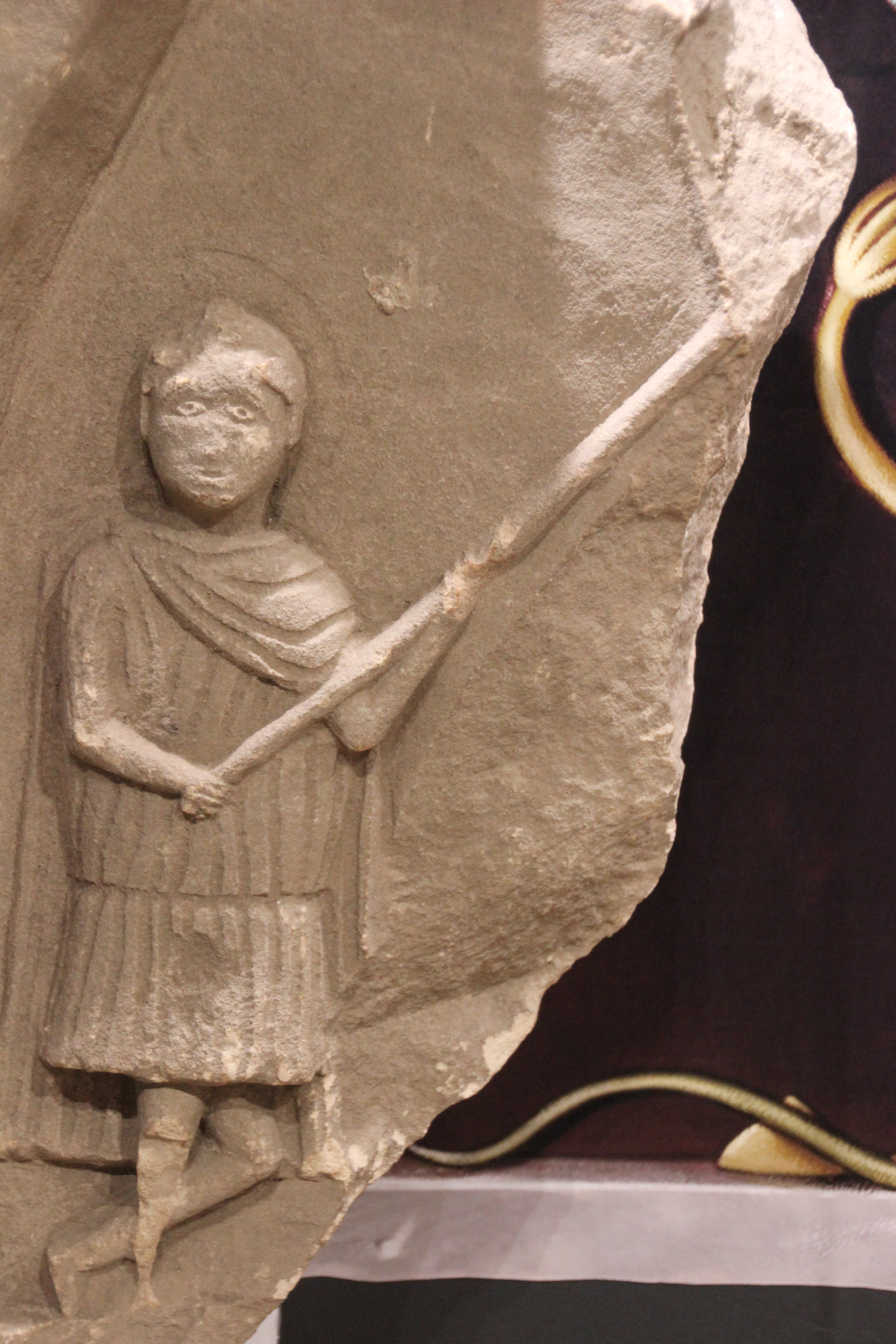
Detail of block No. 1, the dadophore

=== Block No. 2 ===
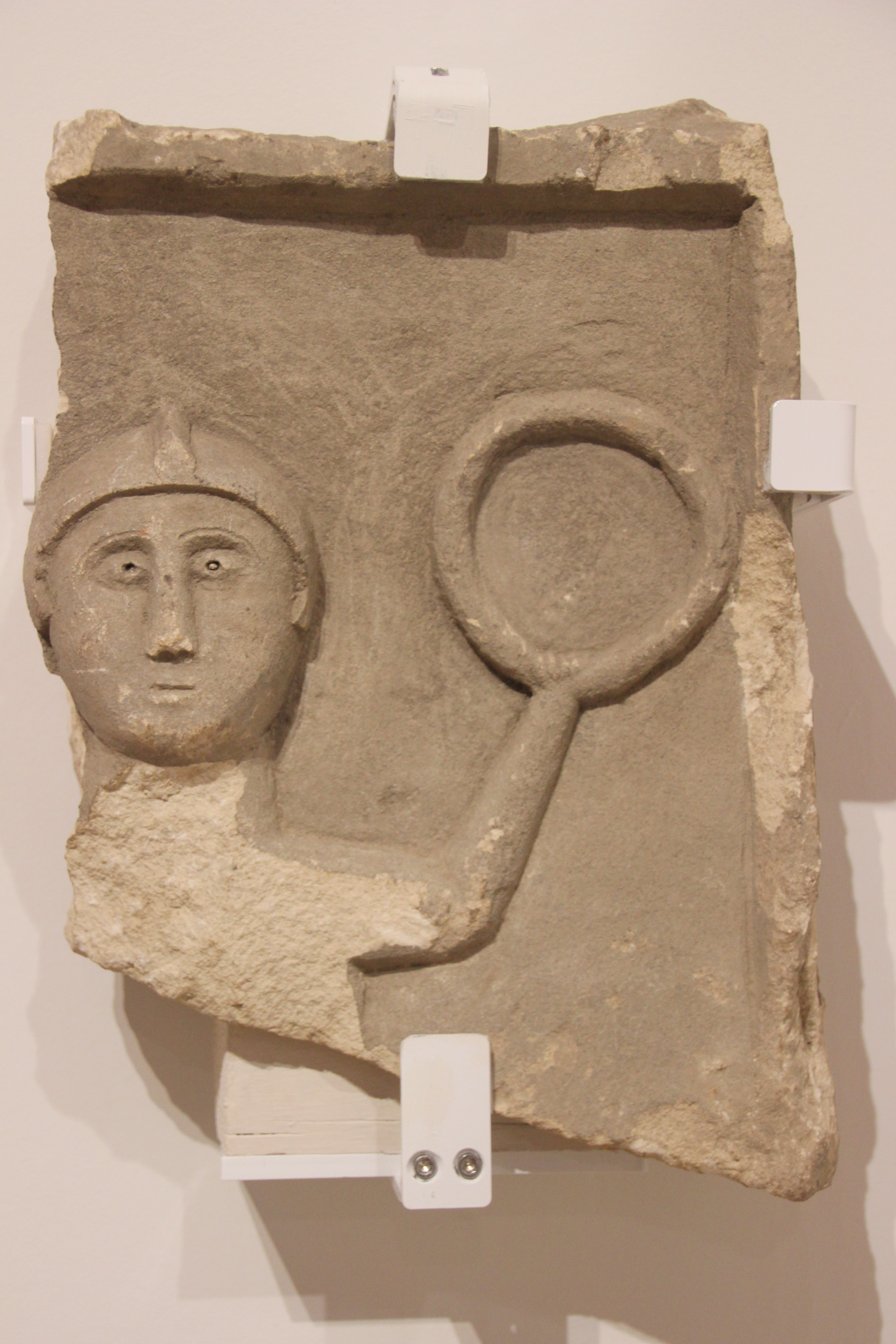
Block No. 2, a fragment of a representation interpreted as the birth of Mithras

Additionally, the block depicts a human figure, albeit in a fragmentary state, measuring 0.39 m by 0.274 m with a thickness of 0.12 m. The relief was also carved on a reused block, sawn into two parts during its reuse. One side features a five-branched rosette and heart rays; the other side is difficult to describe due to exposure to weathering. The original use is difficult to date, as the heart-ray motif was known in the region as early as the 1st century; however, this was not the case for the rosette.

The second block, in its reused form, is more complex than the first because no equivalent has been found. It depicts an "anthropomorphic figure". The block is poorly preserved, and damaged by the excavation equipment. It shows a man wearing a cap and holding a ring. The man's nose is not very flattened, with an "expressionless mouth" and "deeply hollowed-out eyes". The cap resembles that on the other block without being identical. The figure may be nude and is holding a ring, possibly a crown, or another object.

The representation needs to be completed and more complex and unsophisticated.

== Interpretation ==
It is the opinion of specialists in the field that the relief fragments depict Mithra's bull sacrifice. The scenes represent the sacrifice and the birth of the deity.

=== Canonical representation in the Mithraic cult and originality of the Jort blocks ===
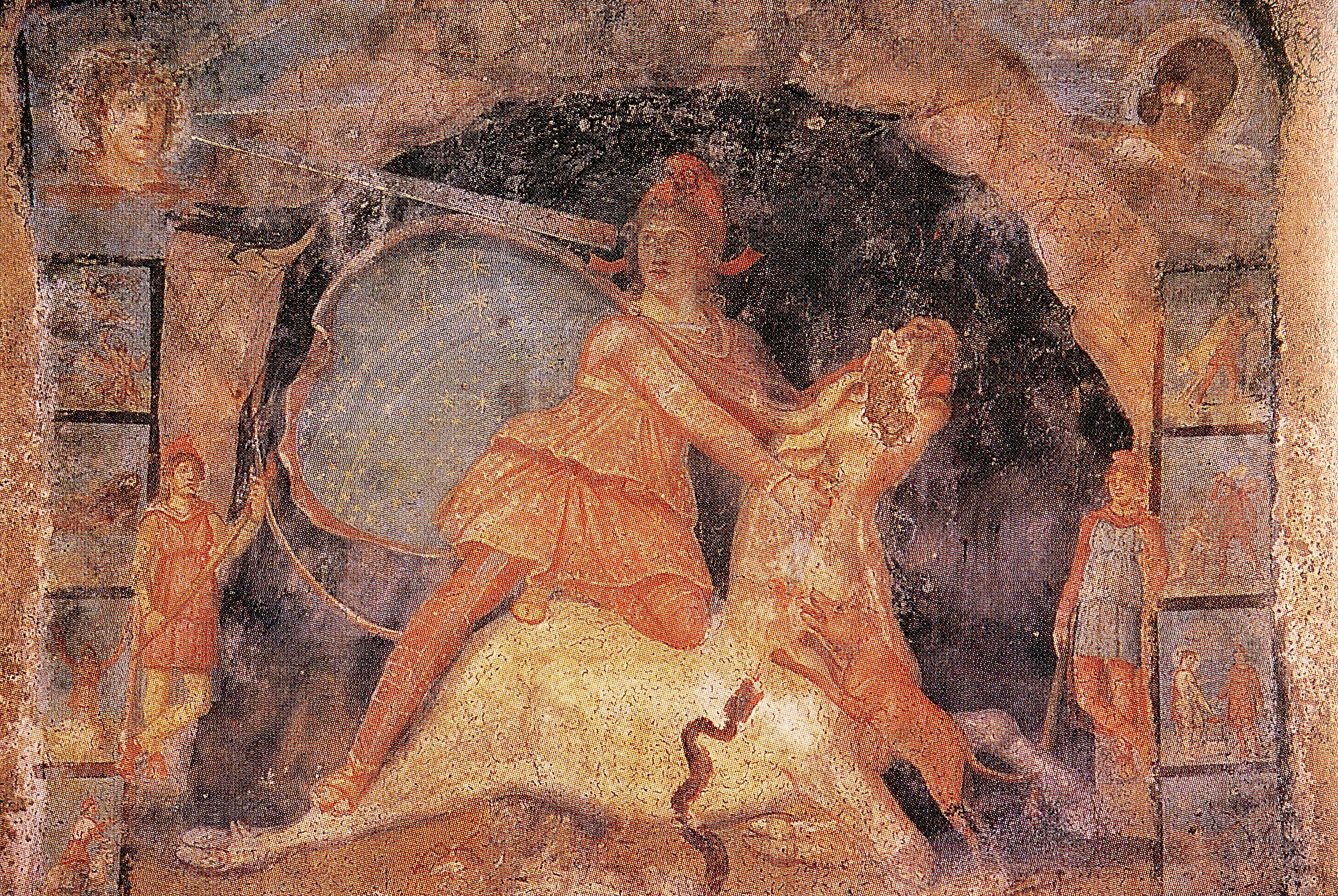
Tauroctony of the Mithra sanctuary in Marino

==== Sanctuaries and classical representations ====
The representations associated with the Mithraic cult are well documented, facilitating the identification of the blocks discovered in Jort. These images were ubiquitous throughout the Roman Empire from the 1st to the 4th centuries.

Mithraic reliefs typically depict the Sun and the Moon framing the image of Mithra sacrificing the bull. In these representations, the Eastern deity is depicted as about to slay the animal. These images were studied at the end of the 19th century by Cumont, and in the 20th century by Vermaseren.

Mithraic sanctuaries are typically modest in scale, with a capacity of ten to thirty individuals. (Note: Dubois 2012, p. 426) They are either integrated into existing structures or constructed as standalone buildings. (Note: Dubois 2012, p. 430) Architecturally, they exhibit minimal embellishment, and the benches designated for worshippers are occasionally adorned with a veneer. (Note: Dubois 2012, p. 437) While painted decorations have been observed occasionally, the absence of mosaics in Gaul indicates that such embellishments were not a prominent feature of Gaulish mithraea. (Note: Dubois 2012, pp. 438–440)

In the building, a crypt is located within the space where Mithra is believed to have sacrificed the bull. The cult podium is situated along the width of the nave, with three altars present, and the tauroctony is near. (Note: Dubois 2012, p. 431) Mithraic iconography is well-documented due to the consistent representation of "the same figures and... the same cult scenes", although there are local variations. (Note: Dubois 2012, p. 433)

==== Block No. 1: Fragment of a tauroctony ====
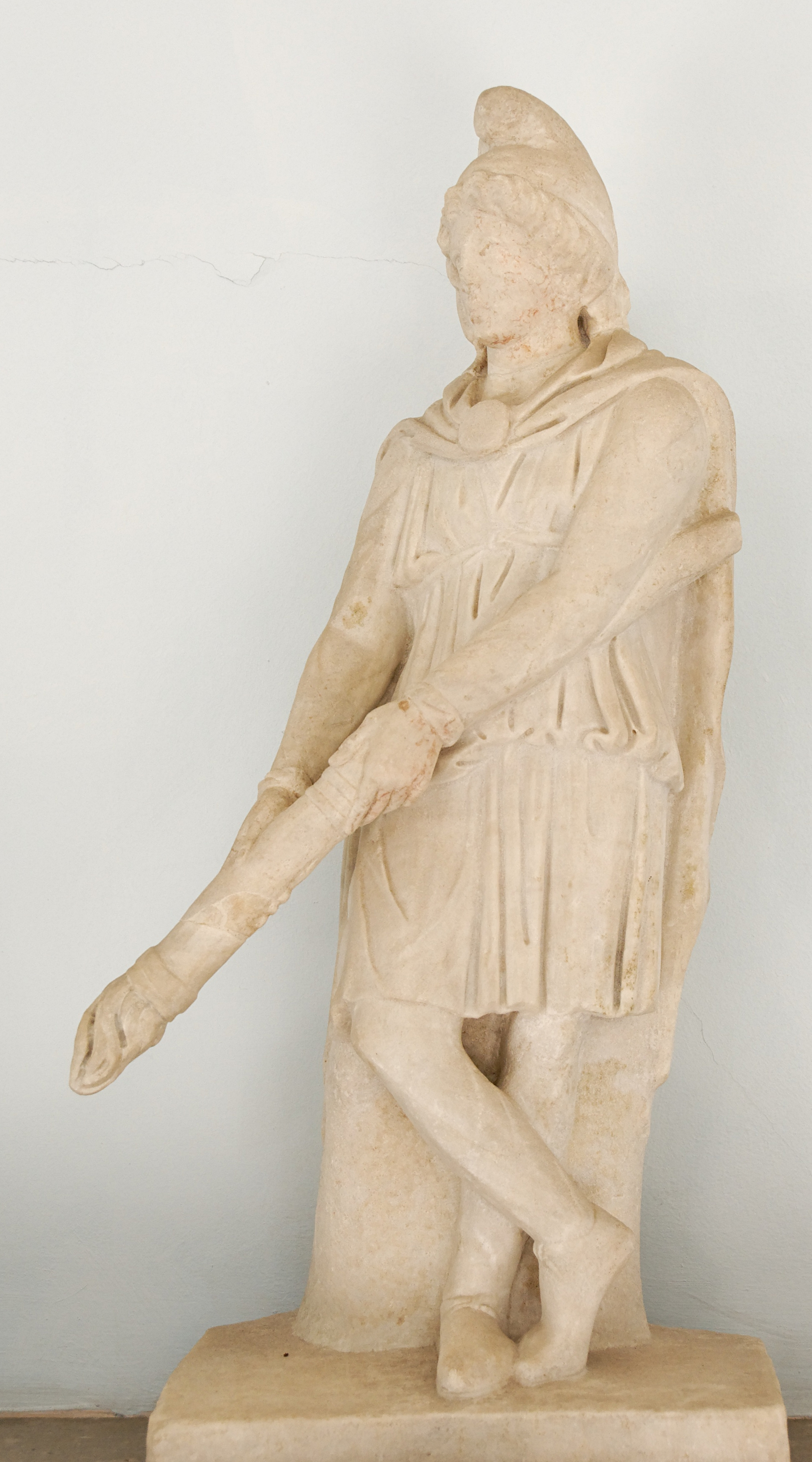
Marble statue from the 3rd century found at Panormus. It represents Cautopatès in dadophore.

The cult statues exhibit many similarities. They often depict Dadophores, "torchbearers" named Cautes and Cautopates, "young acolytes of Mithra", a lion, and scenes of time and Mithra's birth from the rock. The tauroctony occurred "under the gaze of Sol and Luna", (Note: Dubois 2012, pp. 433–434) and the statues were often polychromatic.

The edges of the relief from Jort evoke the image of a niche, which may be understood as a reference to the cave where the god Mithra is said to have sacrificed the bull.

On the left side, one of the two dadophores has been preserved. The two figures were depicted in a strikingly similar manner, with the only discernible difference being the accessory held in the hand. Dressed in the Oriental style, they cross their legs and hold their torches in a manner that differs from one another: one brandishes it upwards, while the other holds it downwards. This symbolism is thought to represent the sunrise and sunset, as well as the beginning and end of the world. These figures are emblematic of the equinoxes. The dadophores are attired in the Oriental style, akin to the deity and elements that are typical of "Asian barbarians", although the Jort representation is naive and incomplete. The Jort figure has lost the top of the object, which was possibly a torch, and the Phrygian cap is also absent. The Jort depiction resembles known representations of Cautes. The significance of the dadophores' figure remains opaque, particularly given their absence from the bull's sacrifice.

The central scene is no longer discernible, although a "bulge" remains.

The radiated head at the summit of the relief is believed to represent Sol, the sun. It is reasonable to posit that the missing side depicted Luna, the moon.

==== Block No. 2: Original representation ====
Its interpretation is challenging as no analogous representation is known. According to studies by Franz Cumont, attention must be paid to the symbols "at the origin of the infinite variants", which constitute a known corpus.

The image of raised arms is a prominent feature of Mithra's birth depictions, collectively known as "Mithra petrogenes". These depict a naked child emerging from a rock, holding a knife and a torch. The torch symbolizes the light that Mithra is said to bring to the world, while the knife represents his role as a sacrificial figure. At Jort, a crown is depicted. Some representations include a globe within a "zodiacal ring symbolizing the cosmic egg at the origin of time and generating the universe". The ring is sometimes replaced by a vegetal crown. If the Jort depiction is indeed a Mithra petrogenes, it serves as an exemplary illustration of the significance placed on the mythical narrative by the followers, rather than the representation itself. The sculpture effectively conveys the "statement of the myth".

Regarding Block No. 2, Schütz proposes an original representation, namely a depiction of the birth of the god Mithra holding the cosmic ring. This interpretation is, however, "conjectural" due to the singular nature of the discovery.

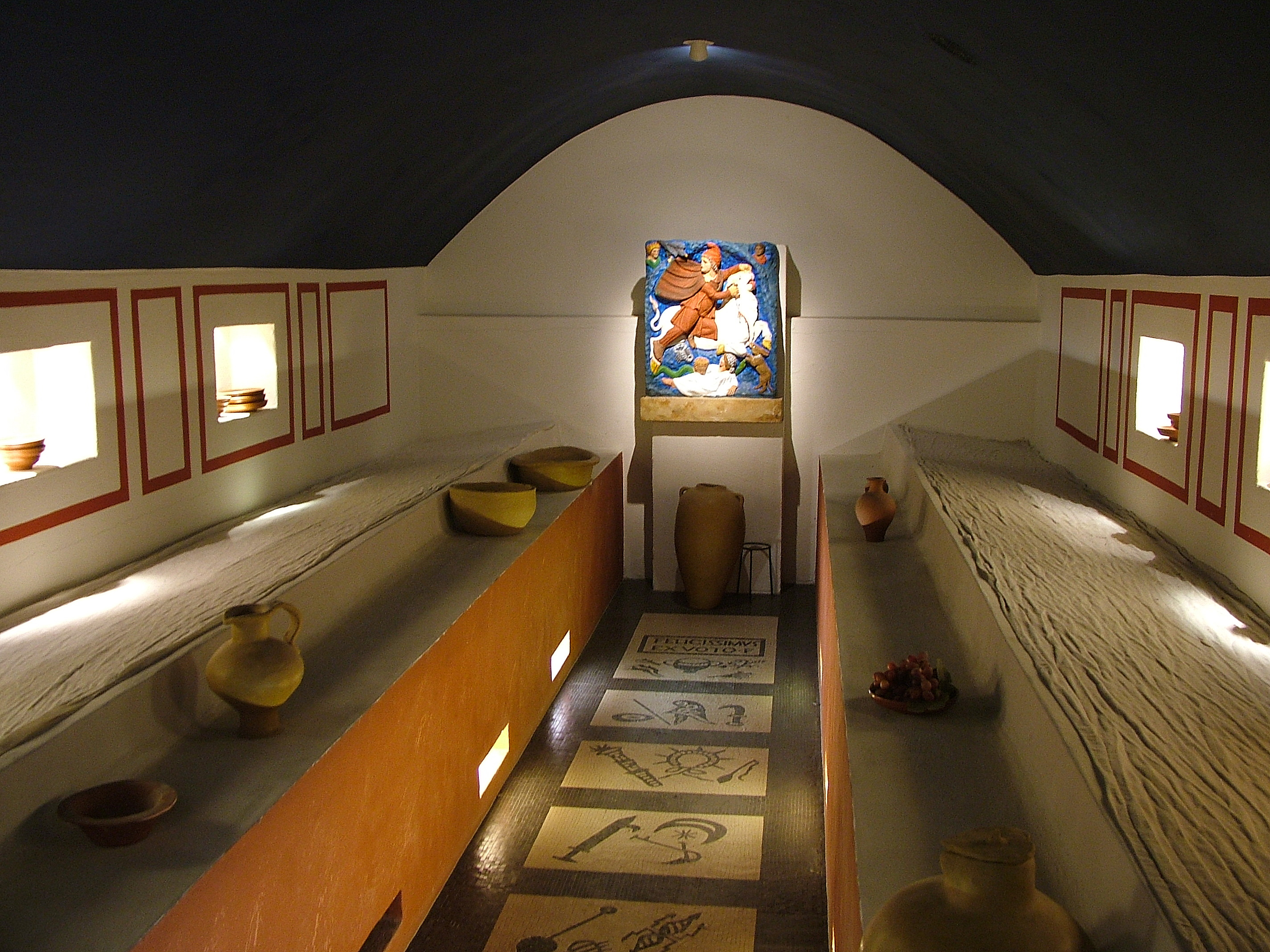
Reconstruction of a fictitious sanctuary at the Museumpark Orientalis in Nijmegen

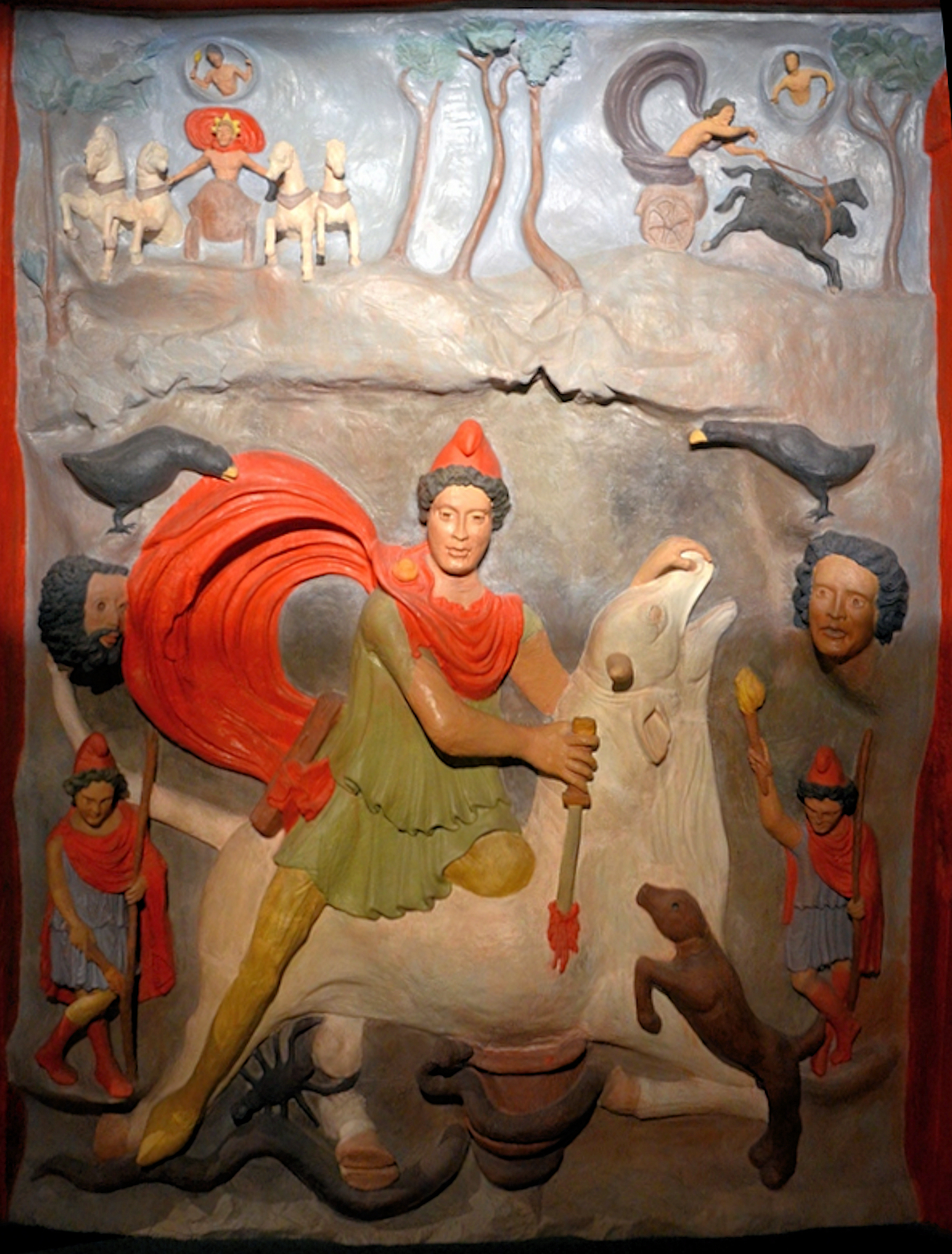
Reconstruction of the large relief of the Mithraic sanctuary at Koenigshoffen

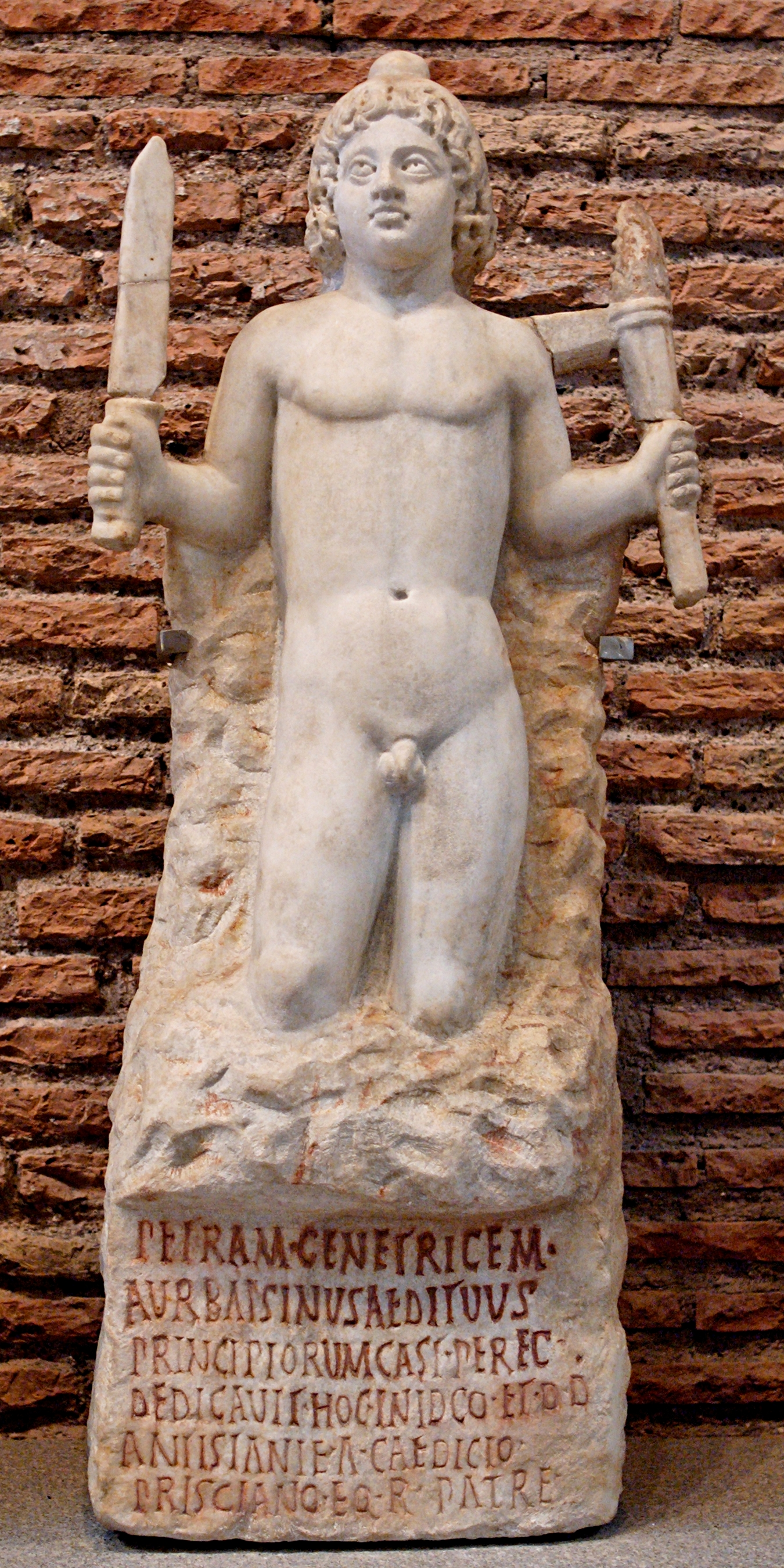
Petrogenic Mithra emerging from the rock, Diocletian baths

=== Testimony to local history at the end of Roman antiquity and the problem of the reliefs' commissioner ===
Between the dissolution of the Tetrarchy and the end of the 4th century, the imperial administration established a defense system. Of particular strategic importance was Jort, a "road junction" situated at the crossroads of several significant routes and on the banks of a coastal river.

The representations of Mithra found in various provinces share similarities, but the works are distinguished by their clumsiness or "distressing mediocrity". They were created by local artisans, and the sculpted reliefs served as an "illustrative support for narration and understanding of the story" during initiations into the deity cult.

The Jort reliefs are compatible with a collective mithraeum and an individual one linked to isolated practice. The commissioner was possibly a former soldier, a merchant, or a member of the empire's administration who had settled in the region. According to Dubois, the mithraeum can be considered "a sanctuary on the fringes of the public sphere". It was constructed at the initiative of a private individual but serves as a public space intended for a community. (Note: Dubois 2012, p. 440) The reliefs were placed in the adyton of temples but could also be placed in homes or private oratories.

The Jort sculptor demonstrated a lack of mastery, as evidenced by the pseudo-halo resulting from "an inability to define regular cutting planes". The design is schematic, and although it should be contextualized within the broader framework of art history, it may be a product of a provincial and popular creation. These reliefs, possibly crafted by a local artisan, seem intended for the devotion of members of modest classes.

The Jort reliefs, undoubtedly of an ancient date, represent a reinterpretation of the myth by a local artist. The production of statues was often undertaken by Gallo-Roman workshops. In the case of Jort, we observe the manifestation of an aesthetic that can be described as an expression of indigenous tradition. The richness of the sanctuary is linked to financial means. The proximity of the discovery of the two blocks and their stylistic similarity suggest that block No. 2 is also attributed to the Mithraic cult in the vicus. They were likely created by the same sculptor due to the same "stylistic schematization". The discovery in "a vicus far removed from economic, political, and military circuits" raises many questions and invites further investigation.

=== Rare testimony to the spread of Mithraism in Northwestern Gaul ===
The archaeological evidence for Mithraism in Roman Gaul is scarce, and in the northwest region of the country, it is virtually absent. In May 2010 or May 2011, a sanctuary was identified in Angers. The Jort reliefs are a "rare witness to the penetration of the Mithraic cult", even into a small vicus. Mithraic sanctuaries were subjected to the ire of early Christians, which explains the paucity of testimonies that have reached us. The tauroctony scene was the most affected by the rage of 4th-century destruction. (Note: Dubois 2012, pp. 434–435)

Mithraism was present in Gaul between the 2nd and 4th centuries. The cult is attested with certainty in the second half of the 2nd century, and its diffusion is thought to have occurred through merchants or soldiers. The number and location of sanctuaries in Gaul are poorly understood, although the density seems to be higher along the Rhine.

Over the following two centuries, spanning the third and fourth centuries, this religion proliferated throughout society. The religion's presence is attested not only in urban centers but also at locations situated along transportation routes or near sanctuaries or thermal establishments. (Note: Dubois 2012, pp. 426–427) An association with domestic structures has been demonstrated in Bordeaux and Angers. (Note: Dubois 2012, p. 427) Approximately half of the known sanctuaries in Gaul are located in rural areas. (Note: Dubois 2012, pp. 427–429) The abandonment and destruction of these sanctuaries are dated to the second half of the 4th and 5th centuries. However, the precise dating of the blocks is uncertain, with the earliest dated specimens originating from the early 2nd century and the latest from the late 4th century. This period encompasses the reign of Theodosius (379–395), during which the cult of Mithras was definitively halted by his edict in 391.

== See also ==
- Mithraism
- Mithraeum

== Bibliography ==
- Deniaux, Élisabeth (2002). "Le monde du sacré" [The world of the sacred]. La Normandie avant les Normands [Normandy before the Normans] (in French). Rennes. pp. 139–192.
- Deshayes, Julien; Hincker, Vincent (2014). Identification de deux figurations mithriaques découvertes à Jort en 2011 [Identification of two Mithraic figurations discovered in Jort in 2011] (in French). Vol. LXXI. Bulletin de la société des antiquaires de Normandie. pp. 69–95. ISBN 9782919026128.
- Dubois, Yves (2012). "Un sanctuaire aux marges de la sphère publique : le mithraeum (état des lieux)" [A sanctuary on the bangs of the public sphere: the Mithraeum (an overview)]. Décor des édiﬁces publics civils et religieux en Gaule durant l'Antiquité, Ier-IVe siècle. Peinture, mosaïque, stuc et décor architectonique [Decorating civil and religious public ediﬁces in Gaul during Antiquity, 1st-4th century. Painting, mosaic, stucco and architectural decor] (in French). pp. 425–446.
- Groud-Cordray, Claude (2007). La Normandie gallo-romaine [Gallo-Roman Normandy] (in French). Cully: OREP. ISBN 978-2-915762-18-1.
- Hincker, Vincent; Berthelot, Sandrine (2018). "Vous avez dit Barbares ? Les temps mérovingiens en Normandie" [Did you say Barbarians? Merovingian times in Normandy]. Archéologia (in French) (568): 24–32.
- Hincker, Vincent; Schütz, Grégory; Deshayes, Julien (2016). Présence des divinités et des cultes dans les villes et les agglomérations secondaires de la Gaule romaine et des régions voisines [Presence of deities and cults in towns and secondary settlements in Roman Gaul and neighbouring regions] (in French). Limoges. pp. 67–80.
- Paumier, Solange; Paumier, Henri (2012a). "Le culte de Mithra à Jort" [The cult of Mithras in Jort]. Histoire et traditions populaires (in French) (117): 14–23.
- Paumier, Solange; Paumier, Henri (2012b). "Les pierres mithriaques de Jort. Leur contexte gallo-romain" [The Mithraic stones of Jort. Their Gallo-Roman context]. Histoire et traditions populaires (in French) (120): 5–26.
- Schütz, Grégory (2018). "Deux figures du dieu Mithra découvertes en Normandie" [Two figures of the god Mithra discovered in Normandy]. Vous avez dit Barbares ? Archéologie des temps mérovingiens en Normandie, Ve – VIIIe siècles [Did you say Barbarians? Archaeology of Merovingian times in Normandy, 5th-8th centuries] (in French). Caen/Gand. pp. 70–73. ISBN 9789461614544.
