= Centrist Alliance =

Centrist Alliance Alliance centriste
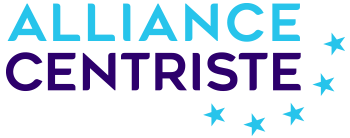
- President: Philippe Folliot
- Founder: Jean Arthuis
- Founded: 27 June 2009
- Preceded by: Rally the Centrists
- Headquarters: 31, rue de Tournon; Paris VI
- Ideology: Liberalism; Pro-Europeanism
- Political position: Centre
- National affiliation: Ensemble Citoyens (Since 2021); La République En Marche! (Since 2017); Union of Democrats and Independents (2012 to 2017)
- Colours: Light blue, Purple
- National Assembly: 1 / 577
- Senate: 3 / 348
- European Parliament: 0 / 79
- Presidency of Regional Councils: 0 / 17
- Presidency of Departmental Councils: 0 / 101

Website
- www.alliancecentriste.fr

The Centrist Alliance (French: Alliance centriste) (AC) is a centrist political party in France.

It was founded in June 2009 by Jean Arthuis, a former member of the Union for French Democracy (UDF) and currently Member of European Parliament, where he also serves as chair of the Committee on Budgets.

The party is seen as a successor to Arthuis' Rally the Centrists (Rassembler les centristes) political association; its main tenet was to re-create the UDF, which was dissolved upon creation of the MoDem and the New Centre.

== Elected officials ==
- Members of the European parliament: Jean Arthuis
- Deputies: Thierry Benoit, Philippe Folliot
- Senators: Muguette Dini, Yves Détraigne, Françoise Férat, Adrien Giraud, Joseph Kergueris, Jean-Claude Merceron, Anne-Marie Payet, Daniel Soulage, François Zocchetto.

In addition, Kergueris is President of the General Council of Morbihan. Thierry Benoit is general councillor in Ille-et-Vilaine.

== Leadership ==
- President: Jean Arthuis (2009–2016)
  Philippe Folliot (2016–present)
