= Georges Coudray =

French politician (1902–1998)

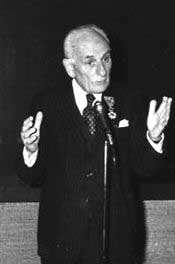

French parliamentarian
- In office 1945–1955
- Constituency: Ille-et-Vilaine; Ille-et-Vilaine's 6th constituency
- In office 1958–1962

Personal details
- Born: 2 June 1902
- Died: 18 January 1998 (aged 95)
- Party: MRP

Georges Coudray (2 June 1902, in Évran, Côtes d'Armor – 18 January 1998 in Saint Malo) was a French politician, and a deputy to the French National Assembly for the Popular Republican Movement.

He was the last mayor of Paramé before its merger with the city of Saint Malo. He was also one of the pioneers of affordable housing after World War II.

== Sources ==
- (in French) Biography on the French Parliament website
