= Jort =

- Commune
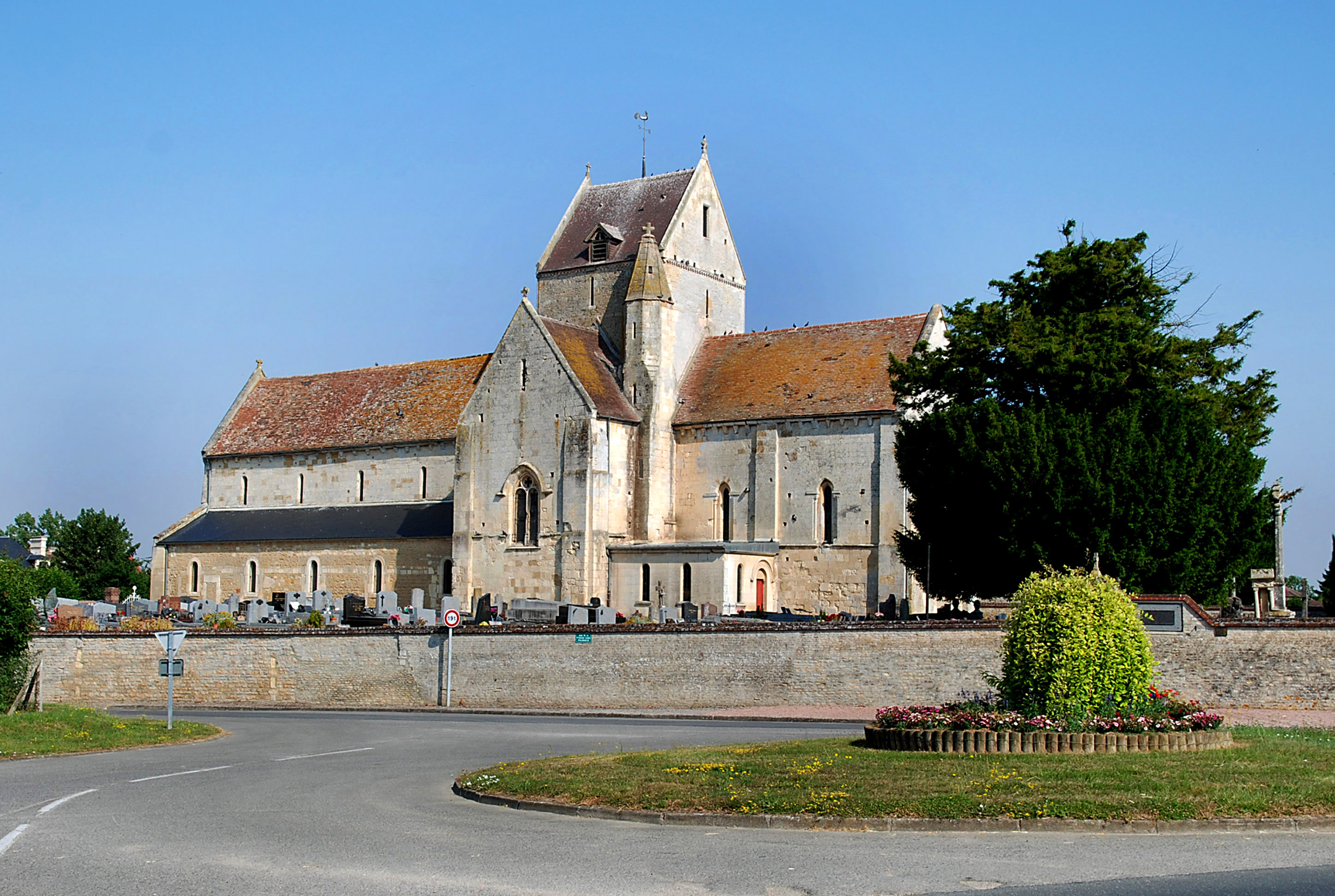
- The church in Jort
- Location of Jort
- Location within France Location within Normandy
- Coordinates: 48°58′26″N 0°04′42″W
- Country: France
- Region: Normandy
- Department: Calvados
- Arrondissement: Caen
- Canton: Falaise
- Intercommunality: Pays de Falaise

Government
  - Mayor (2020–2026): Jean-François Guillemot
- Area^{1}: 6.58 km^{2} (2.54 sq mi)
- Elevation: 43 m (141 ft)
- Highest elevation: 67 m (220 ft)
- Lowest elevation: 29 m (95 ft)
- Population (2023): 303
  - Density: 46.0/km^{2} (119/sq mi)
- Time zone: UTC+01:00 (CET)
  - Summer (DST): UTC+02:00 (CEST)
- INSEE/Postal code: 14345 /14170
- ^{1} French Land Register data, which excludes lakes, ponds, glaciers > 1 km^{2} (0.386 sq mi or 247 acres) and river estuaries.

Jort (French pronunciation: [ʒɔʁ]) is a commune in the Calvados department in the Normandy region in northwestern France.

== Geography ==
The commune is made up of the following collection of villages and hamlets, Macé and Jort.

The Dives river runs through the commune, as well as the Perrières and the Douit du Houle.

== Population ==
Historical population
Year	Pop.	±% p.a.
1968	367	—
1975	351	−0.63%
1982	354	+0.12%
1990	317	−1.37%
1999	306	−0.39%
2007	289	−0.71%
2012	327	+2.50%
2017	299	−1.77%
2023	303	+0.22%
Source: INSEE

== Points of Interest ==
- Town hall - contains the Mithraic reliefs of Jort, discovered in 2011 as part of sanitation works in the commune.

=== National Heritage sites ===
- Église Saint-Gervais-et-Saint-Protais de Jort - a twelfth century church that was listed as a Monument historique in 1927.

== See also ==
- Communes of the Calvados department
- Mithraic Reliefs of Jort
