= Joseph Kergueris =

French politician

Joseph Kergueris (born 2 October 1938) was a member of the Senate of France, who represented the Morbihan department. He is a member of the Centrist Union.

== Biography ==
Joseph Kergueris began his political career as mayor of Landévant in 1971. Known for his skills in conference management as member of the Union for French Democracy (UDF), Kergueris was elected senator on 23 September 2001, representing the Morbihan Department.

In 2004, he was elected president of the Morbihan County Council, succeeding Jean-Charles Cavaillé, president since 1998.

Former member of the UDF, he stressed non-affiliation with the Democratic Movement^{1}. He belonged to the pilot committee of Gather the Centrists, a club ran by his senate colleague Jean Arthuis, which became part of the Centrist Alliance in 2009.

== Current Elected Offices ==
- President of Morbihan County Council since 2004.
- Senator of Morbihan District since 2001.
- General Advisor for the Pluvigner township since 1979.

== Former Elected Offices ==
- Regional Advisor to Brittany, 1984 to 2001.
- Mayor of Landévant, 1971 to 2004.
- President of Community of Communes of pays d'Auray, 2002 to 2008.
