= List of senators of Haute-Loire =

Location of Haute-Loire in France

Following is a list of senators of Haute-Loire, people who have represented the department of Haute-Loire in the Senate of France.

== Third Republic ==
Senators for Haute-Loire under the French Third Republic were:

- Balthazar Jacotin (1876–1878)
- Edmond du Motier de La Fayette (1876–1890)
- Ernest Vissaguet (1879–1920)
- Clément Allemand (1891–1900)
- Charles Dupuy (1900–1923)
- Louis Devins (1913–1917)
- Auguste Foulhy (1920–1924)
- Francisque Enjolras (1920–1933)
- Régis Martin-Binachon (1924–1938)
- Édouard Néron (1924–1940)
- Julien Fayolle (1933–1935)
- Laurent Eynac (1935–1940)
- Joseph Antier (1938–1940)

== Fourth Republic ==
Senators for Haute-Loire under the French Fourth Republic were:

- Paul Chambriard (1946–1959)
- Jean de Lachomette (1948–1959)

== Fifth Republic ==
Senators for Haute-Loire under the French Fifth Republic:

In office	Name	Party or group	Notes
1959–1974	Robert Bouvard	Républicains et Indépendants	
1959–1974	Jean de Lachomette	Centre Républicain d'Action Rurale et Sociale	
1974–1983	René Chazelle	Socialiste	
1974–1978	Jean Proriol	Union des Républicains et des Indépendants	Until 12 March 1978 (elected deputy)
1978–2011	Adrien Gouteyron	Union pour un Mouvement Populaire	Elected 11 June 1978 (by-election)
1983–1996	Jean-Paul Chambriard	Républicains et Indépendants	Died in office 24 January 1996
1996–1998	Régis Ploton	Républicains et Indépendants	From 25 January 1996 in place of Jean-Paul Chambriard; Died in office 2 February 1998
1998–2001	Guy Vissac	Rassemblement pour la République	Elected 27 September 1998 (by-election)
2001–2014	Jean Boyer	Union des Démocrates et Indépendants	Resigned 3 November 2014
2011–2017	Gérard Roche	Union Centriste	
From 2015	Olivier Cigolotti	Union Centriste	Elected 25 January 2015 (by-election)
From 2017	Laurent Duplomb	Les Républicains	

== Sources ==
- Liste des anciens sénateurs de la IIIème République par circonscription (in French), Sénat de France
- Liste des anciens sénateurs de la IVème République par circonscription (in French), Sénat de France
- Liste des anciens sénateurs de la Vème République par circonscription (in French), Sénat de France
- Liste par département – Haute-Loire (in French), Sénat de France
