= Departmental Council of Calvados =

Departmental legislature in France

Departmental Council of Calvados Conseil départemental de Calvados

Leadership
- President: Jean-Léonce Dupont, LC since 31 March 2011

Structure
- Seats: 50
- Political groups: Government (40): DVD (21); LR (9); DVG (4); UDI (3); PRG (1); LC (1); RE (1); Opposition (10): PS (4); DVG (3); LÉ (2); PCF (1); www.calvados.fr

The Departmental Council of Calvados (French: Conseil Départemental du Calvados) is the deliberative assembly of the Calvados department in the region of Normandy. It consists of 50 members (general councilors) from 25 cantons and its headquarters are in Caen, capital of the department.

The President of the General Council is Jean-Léonce Dupont.

== Vice-Presidents ==
The President of the Departmental Council is assisted by 15 vice-presidents chosen from among the departmental advisers. Each of them has a delegation of authority.

List of vice-presidents of the Calvados Departmental Council (as of 2021)
Order	Name	Party	Canton
1st	Sylvie Lenourrichel	DVD	Les Monts d'Aunay
2nd	Hubert Courseaux	DVD	Pont-l'Évêque
3rd	Clara Dewaële	DVC	Falaise
4th	Xavier Charles	DVD	Mézidon Vallée d'Auge
5th	Beatrice Guillaume	LR	Cabourg
6th	Cedric Nouvelot	DVD	Courseulles-sur-Mer
7th	Melanie Lepoultier	UCD	Bayeux
8th	Michel Lamarre	DVD	Honfleur-Deauville
9th	Florence Boulay	Departmental majority	Evrecy
10th	Ludwig Willaume	UCD	Caen-1
11th	Patricia Gady Duquesne	DVD	Trevieres
12th	Michel Fricout	DVD	Ouistreham
13th	Valerie Desquesne	United and Innovative for Condé-en-Normandie	Condé-en-Normandie
14th	Marc Andreu Sabater	DVC	Vire Normandie
15th	Angelique Perini	UD	Lisieux

== See also ==
- Calvados
- General councils of France
- Departmental Council of Calvados(official website)
