= Billy-sur-Ourcq =

- Commune
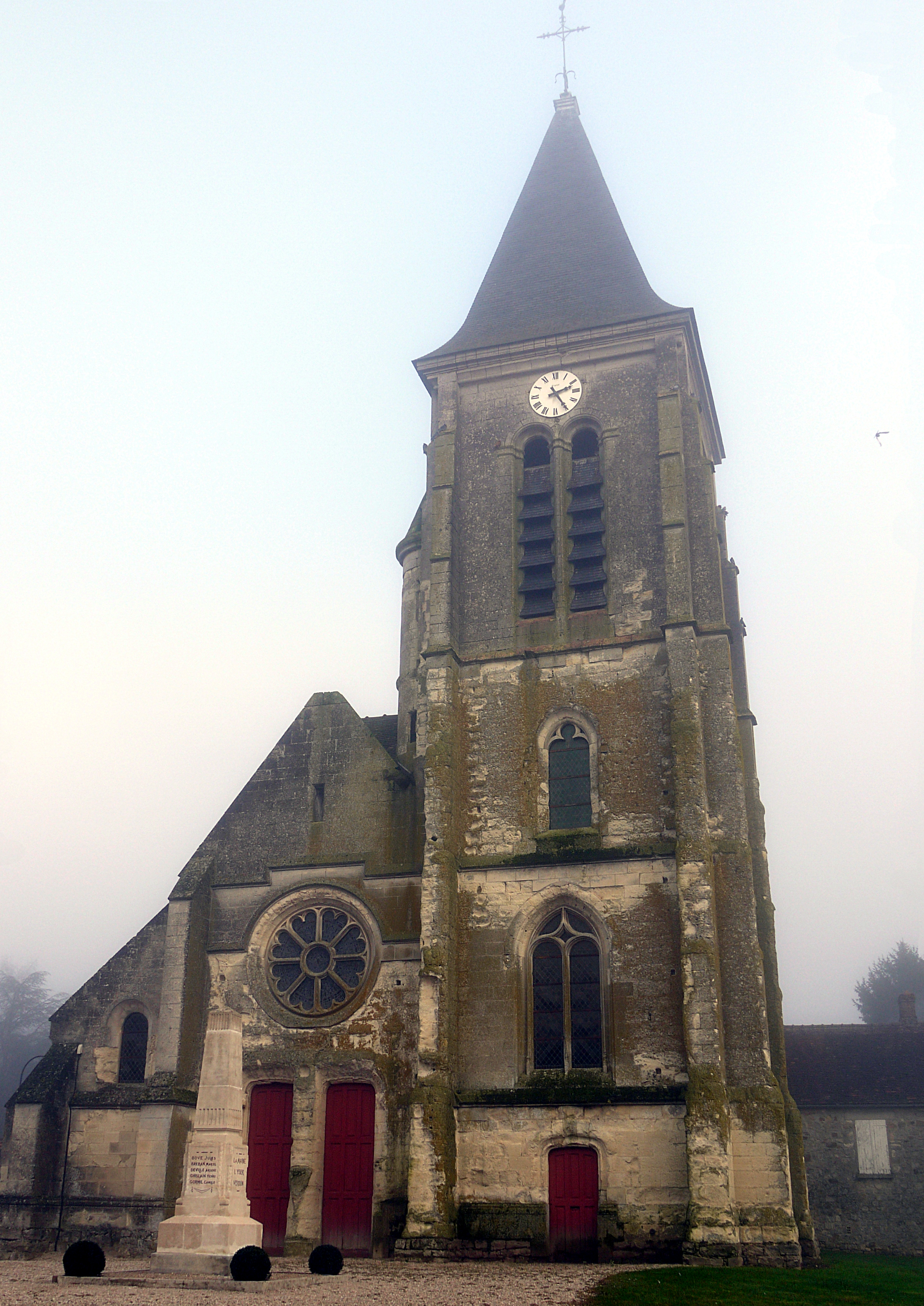
- The church of Billy-sur-Ourcq
- Location of Billy-sur-Ourcq
- Location within France Location within Hauts-de-France
- Coordinates: 49°13′07″N 3°18′09″E
- Country: France
- Region: Hauts-de-France
- Department: Aisne
- Arrondissement: Soissons
- Canton: Villers-Cotterêts
- Intercommunality: Oulchy le Château

Government
  - Mayor (2026–32): Françoise Emond
- Area^{1}: 10.17 km^{2} (3.93 sq mi)
- Elevation: 153 m (502 ft)
- Highest elevation: 194 m (636 ft)
- Lowest elevation: 105 m (344 ft)
- Population (2023): 194
  - Density: 19.1/km^{2} (49.4/sq mi)
- Time zone: UTC+01:00 (CET)
  - Summer (DST): UTC+02:00 (CEST)
- INSEE/Postal code: 02090 /02210
- ^{1} French Land Register data, which excludes lakes, ponds, glaciers > 1 km^{2} (0.386 sq mi or 247 acres) and river estuaries.

Billy-sur-Ourcq is a commune in the department of Aisne in Hauts-de-France in northern France.

== Population ==
Historical population
Year	Pop.	±% p.a.
1968	205	—
1975	206	+0.07%
1982	201	−0.35%
1990	208	+0.43%
1999	201	−0.38%
2007	217	+0.96%
2012	216	−0.09%
2017	213	−0.28%
2023	194	−1.55%
Source: INSEE

== See also ==
- Communes of the Aisne department
