= Jean-René Fourtou =

- Born: 1939 (age 86–87)
- Education: École Polytechnique
- Occupation: Business executive
- Spouse: Janelly Fourtou

Jean-René Fourtou (born 1939) is a French business executive. He served as the chief executive officer and chairman of Vivendi from 2002 to 2005. He now serves as its honorary chairman.

== Biography ==
Jean-René Fourtou is the son of René Fourtou, a mathematics teacher. He is married to Janelly Fourtou, a Member of the European Parliament.

Close to Édouard Balladur, he took over as head of the Rhône-Poulenc group in 1986 and oversaw its privatization from 1993 onwards and its dismantling. In 2002, he took over as head of Vivendi with the aim of selling off the group piece by piece.

In 2012, he assembled an informal group (including Sylvain Fort, Étienne Mougeotte, and Charles Villeneuve) to promote Nicolas Sarkozy's candidacy.
