= Claude Biwer =

French politician

Claude Biwer (born 15 May 1936 in Marville, Meuse) is a former member of the Senate of France, who represented the Meuse department. He is a member of the New Centre and sat in the Senate as a member of the Centrist Union group.
