= Thierry Benoit =

French politician

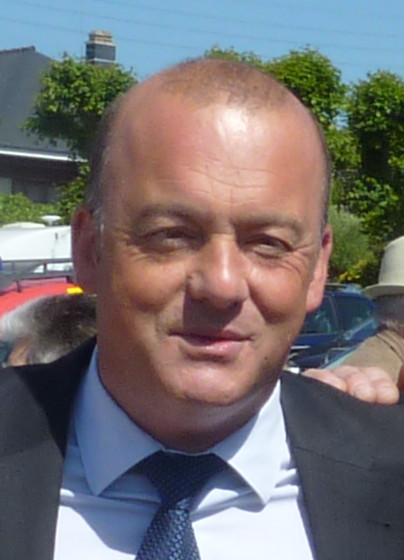
- Parliamentary group: MoDem, (2007), New Centre (2007-2012), AC (2012-2017), UDI (2017 on)

Deputy for Ille-et-Vilaine's 6th constituency in the National Assembly of France
- Incumbent
- Assumed office 2007
- Preceded by: Marie-Thérèse Boisseau

Personal details
- Born: 13 September 1966 (age 59) Fougères, Ille-et-Vilaine

Thierry Benoit (born 13 September 1966 in Fougères, Ille-et-Vilaine) is a French politician of the Union of Democrats and Independents (UDI) who has been serving as a member of the National Assembly of France since 2007. He represents the Ille-et-Vilaine department.

== Political career ==
In parliament, Benoit serves as member of the Committee on Economic Affairs.

In July 2019, Benoit voted against the French ratification of the European Union’s Comprehensive Economic and Trade Agreement (CETA) with Canada.
