= Jean-Marie Cavada =

French politician, former journalist and media executive (born 1940)

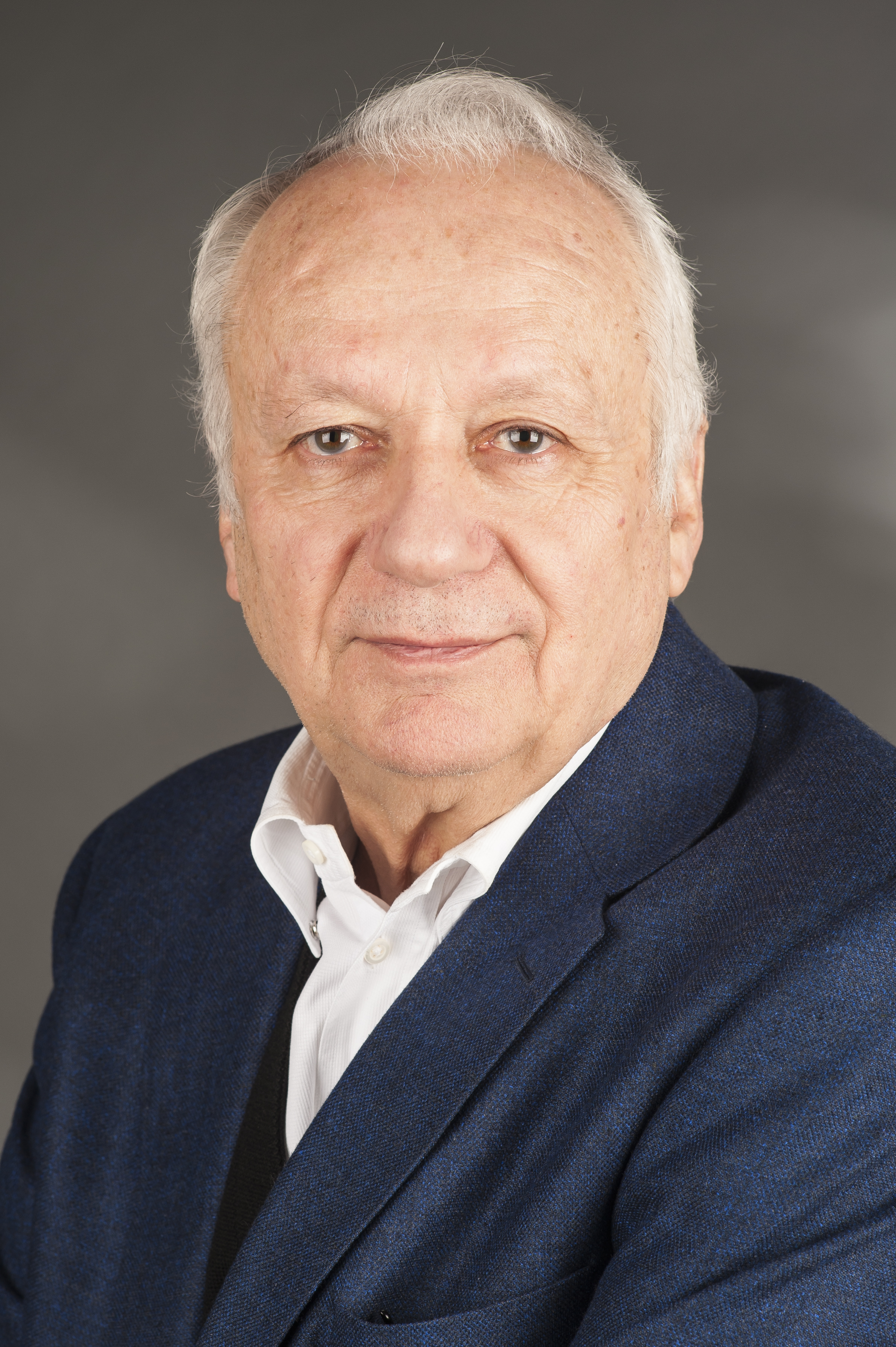

Member of the European Parliament
- In office 2004–2019
- Constituency: Île-de-France

Personal details
- Born: 24 February 1940 (age 86) Épinal, France
- Party: Génération Citoyens (2015–present)
- Other political affiliations: Nous Citoyens (2014–2015); New Centre (2009–2014); Union for French Democracy (2004–2008)

Jean-Marie Cavada (French pronunciation: [ʒɑ̃ maʁi kavada]; born 24 February 1940 in Épinal, Vosges) is a French politician and former journalist and media executive who last served as a Member of the European Parliament for Ile de France from 2004 until 2019. Since 3 December 2011 he is president of the European Movement France.

== Early life ==
Cavada was born on 24 February 1940 in Épinal, Lorraine, to Spanish parents who disappeared during World War II. He was raised by five different foster parents. His grandson is named Robin after Yitzhak Rabin, the assassinated Israeli prime minister.

== Political career ==
Cavada was a member of the former Union for French Democracy, which was part of the Alliance of Liberals and Democrats for Europe, and a deputy for the south-west of France. He chaired the Committee on Civil Liberties, Justice and Home Affairs and was a substitute for the Committee on Economic and Monetary Affairs.

In addition to his committee assignments, Cavada was a member of the Parliament's delegation to the EU–Romania Joint Parliamentary Committee, from 2004 to 2009. He was also a member of the European Parliament's Advisory Committee on the Conduct of Members from 2014 until 2019.

After the creation of the MoDem as a replacement of the Union for French Democracy, he created his own party Civic Alliance for Democracy in Europe. For the 2009 European Parliament election, he was the third member of the list of the presidential majority (UMP/NC/LGM), under the New Centre label. He was a member of the Alliance of Liberals and Democrats for Europe Group.

In 2015 Cavada introduced a proposal to restrict the freedom of panorama in all EU countries indicating that this would limit the impact of "American monopolies such as Facebook and also Wikimedia" and serve to protect "a sector of European culture and creativity". The proposal was rejected by the European Parliament.

== Honors and awards ==
Knight of the Order of Legion of Honour (1998)
