= 1964 French cantonal elections =

Cantonale elections to renew canton general councillors were held in France on 8 and 15 March 1964.

== Electoral system ==
The cantonales elections use the same system as the regional or legislative elections. There is a 10% threshold (10% of registered voters) needed to proceed to the second round.

== National results ==
Runoff results missing

Party/Alliance	Seats	Change
SFIO	286	+15
Others	204	+6
Miscellaneous Left	202	+6
Radical Party	199	−39
CNIP	165	−44
MRP	148	−8
UNR	123	+33
PCF	99	+49
RI	81	+5
Far-Left	40	+11
Far-Right and Poujadists	15	±0
