= Jean-Léonce Dupont =

French politician

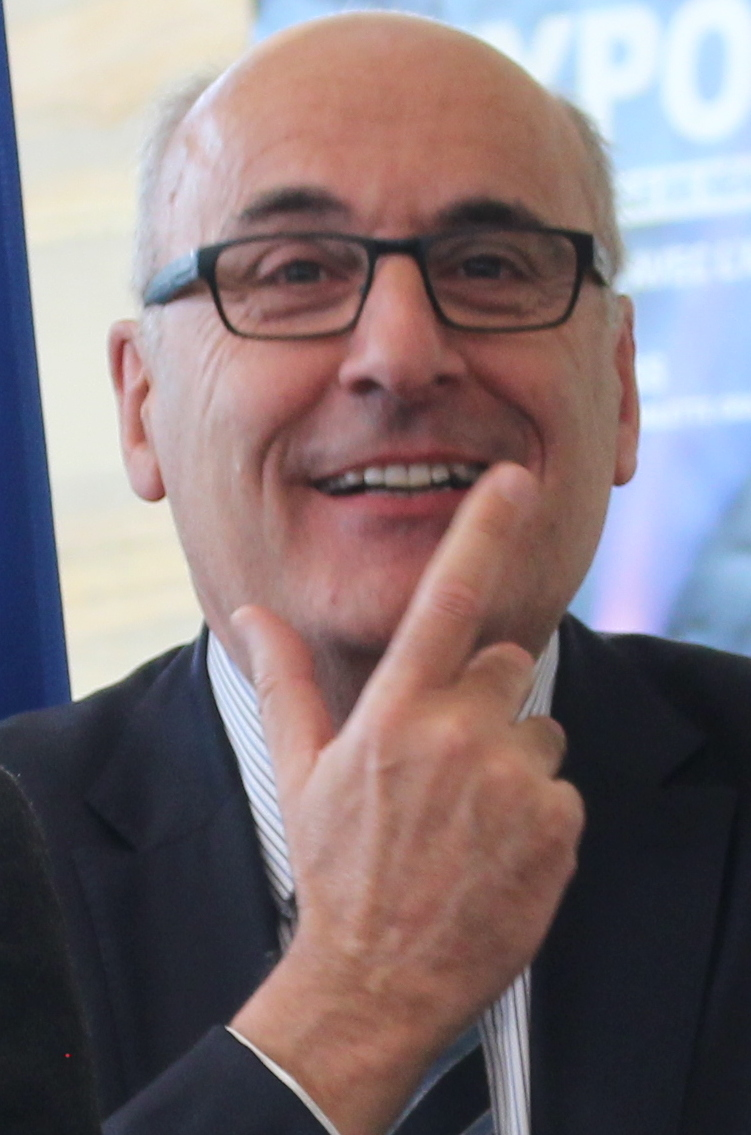
- Dupont during the opening ceremony of the Bayeux library "Les 7 Lieux"

President of the Departmental council of Calvados
- Incumbent
- Assumed office 31 March 2011
- Preceded by: Anne d'Ornano

Member of the French Senate for Calvados
- In office 1 October 1998 – 1 October 2017
- Preceded by: Philippe de Bourgoing
- Succeeded by: Sonia de La Provôté

Mayor of Bayeux
- In office 18 June 1995 – 18 March 2001
- Preceded by: Jean Le Carpentier
- Succeeded by: Patrick Gomont

Personal details
- Born: 31 January 1955 (age 70); Bayeux, France
- Political party: UDI; The Centrists

Jean-Léonce Dupont (French pronunciation: [ʒɑ̃ leɔ̃s dypɔ̃]; born 31 January 1955) is a French politician and a former member of the French Senate. He represents the Calvados department and is both a Vice President of the Senate and his Union for French Democracy Party. He was mayor of Bayeux between 1995 and 2001.
