= Jean Boyer (politician) =

French politician (1937–2025)

Senator for Haute-Loire
- In office 23 September 2001 – 2 November 2014

Personal details
- Born: 4 January 1937
- Died: 21 July 2025 (aged 88)
- Party: Centrist Union, The Centrists

Jean Boyer (French: [ʒɑ̃ bwaje]; 4 January 1937 – 21 July 2025) was a French politician, member of The Centrists.

== Life and career ==
Boyer was born in Blanzac, near Saint-Paulien (Haute-Loire) on 4 January 1937. He began in the 1970s a career as a local elected representative. He was mayor of Blanzac from 1971 to 1995. In 1979 he became the general counsel of canton of Saint-Paulien. Then, in 1985, he became the vice-president of the General Council of Haute-Loire, then chaired by the centrist Jacques Barrot (UDF – CDS). He was also a member of the regional council of Auvergne from 1986 to 1998.

In addition to his political activities, he held various positions within the professional agricultural organizations. Vice-president of the Mutualité sociale agricole (1983), president of the Conservatoire botanique national du Massif Central of Chavaniac-Lafayette (1996–2003), he was appointed as a member of the Economic, Social and Environmental Council, of which he chaired the agriculture section and food between 1996 and 2001.

Candidate DVD in the 2001 senatorial elections, he defeated the outgoing Guy Vissac (RPR) and became a senator from Haute-Loire. At the Senate, he specialized in agricultural issues and joined the group of the Centrist Union (UC), of which he was elected vice-president. In 2011, after having given up the vice-presidency of the General Council, he announced his intention to run for a new parliamentary mandate. He was re-elected senator and elected secretary of the Senate in October 2011.

Member of the New UDF in the 2000s, he subsequently joined The Centrists, and in 2010 participated in the founding of the federation of Haute-Loire of the Centrist party.

Boyer was a knight of the Legion of Honor, an officer of the Ordre national du Mérite and commander of the Mérite agricole.

He announced in January 2014 his intention to leave the Senate on the following 1 October to allow the election of his deputy, Olivier Cigolotti.

Boyer died on 21 July 2025, at the age of 88.

== Sources ==
- Page on the Senate website
