= Jean-Claude Merceron =

French politician (born 1942)

Jean-Claude Merceron (born 12 January 1942 in Givrand) is a former member of the Senate of France, who represented the Vendée department from 2004 to 2014. He is a member of the Centrist Alliance and caucuses with the Centrist Union.

== Bibliography ==
- Page on the Senate website (in French)
