= Muguette Dini =

French politician (1940–2026)

Muguette Dini (16 March 1940 – 7 April 2026) was a French politician who was a member of the Senate of France. She represented the Rhône department and was a member of the Centrist Alliance. Dini died on 7 April 2026, at the age of 86.

== Bibliography ==
- Page on the Senate website
