= Yves Détraigne =

French politician (born 1954)

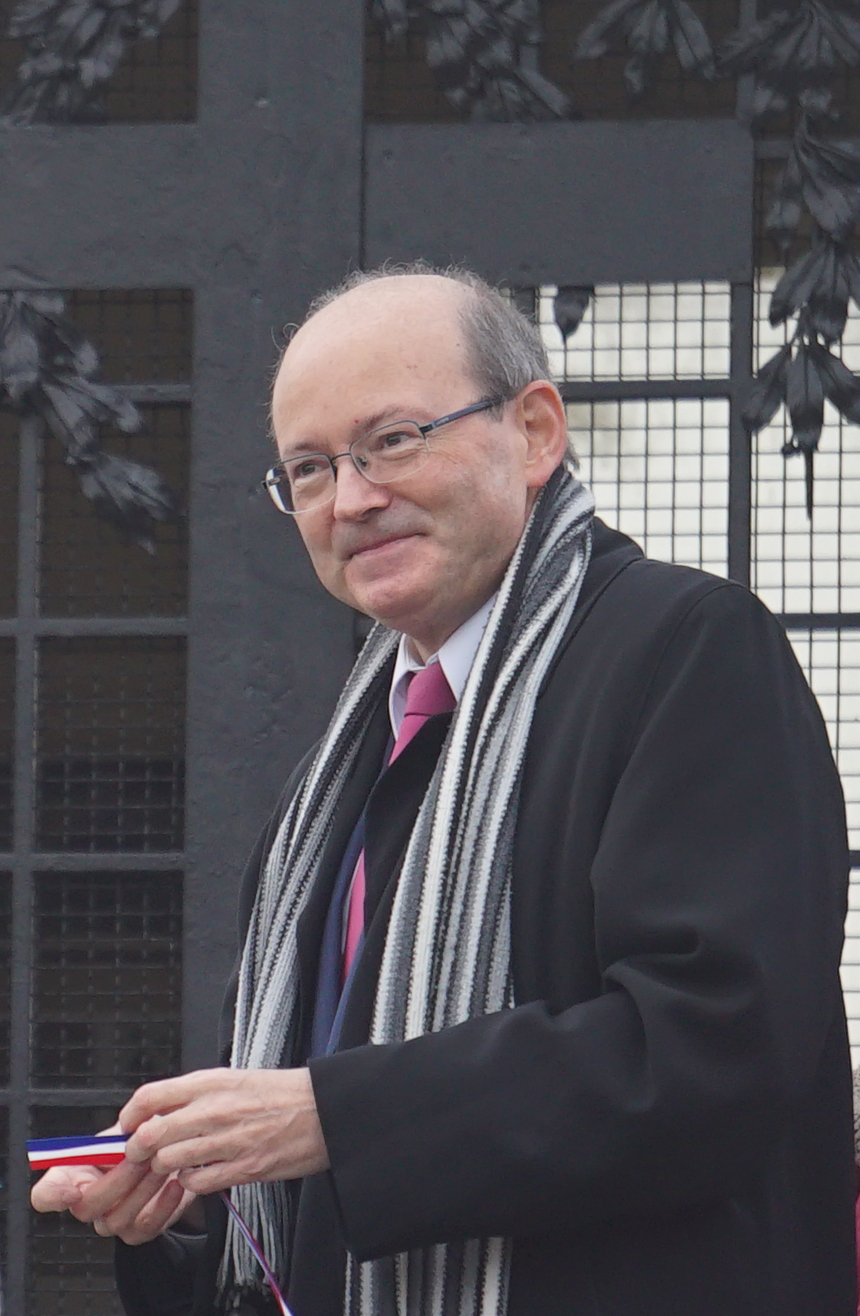
- Yves Détraigne in 2015

Member of the French Senate for Marne
- Incumbent
- Assumed office 1 October 2001

Mayor of Witry-lès-Reims
- In office 1989–2017
- Succeeded by: Michel Keller

Personal details
- Born: 21 December 1954 (age 71) Reims, France
- Party: UDI
- Education: ÉNA

Yves Détraigne (born 21 December 1954 in Reims, Marne) is a French politician and a member of the Senate of France. He represents the Marne department and is a member of the Centrist Alliance.

== Bibliography ==
- Page on the Senate website
- Official website
