= Claire Gibault =

French conductor and politician (born 1945)

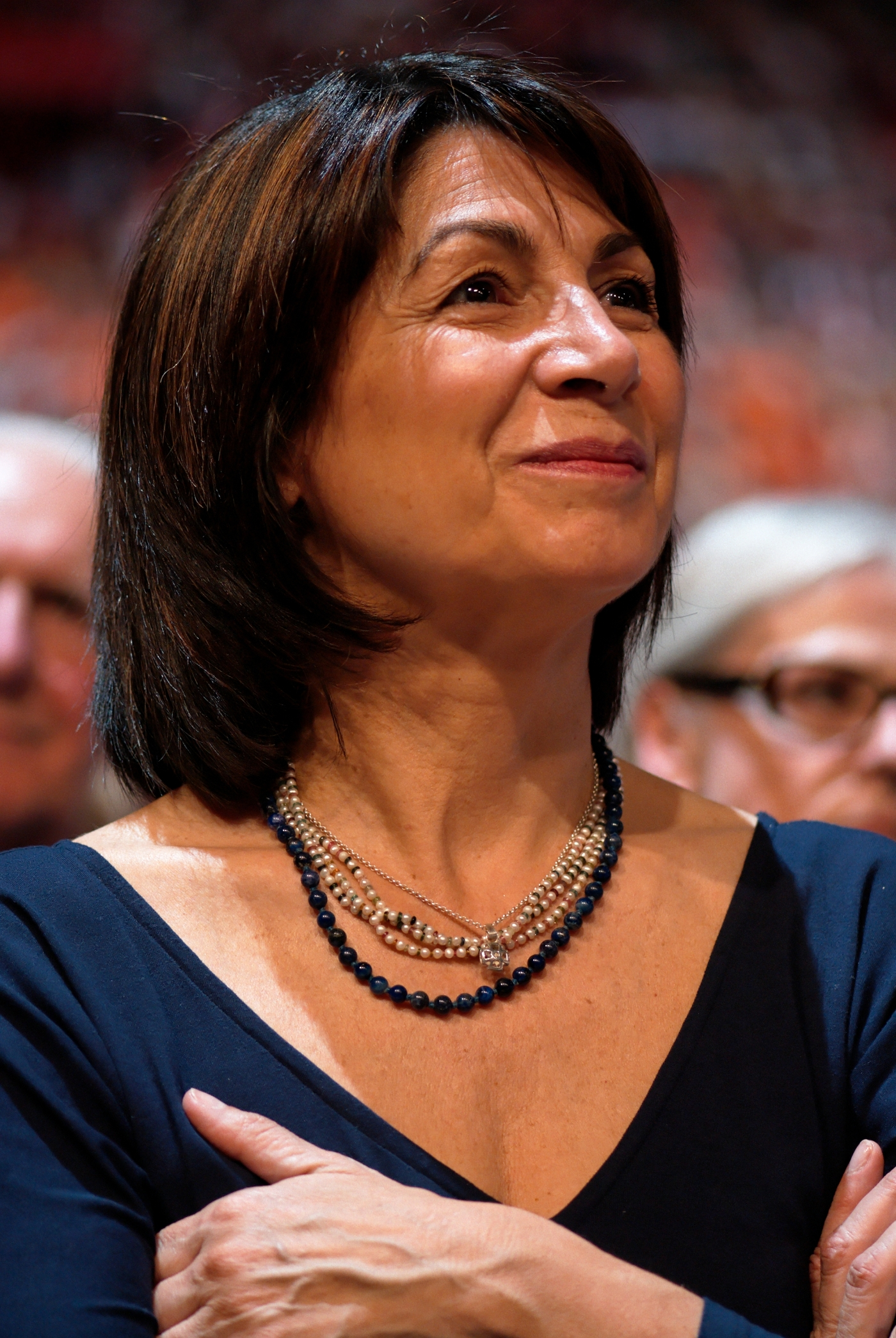
Claire Gibault at a rally for François Bayrou, centrist candidate in the 2007 French presidential election

Claire Gibault (born 31 October 1945 in Le Mans) is a French conductor and politician and a Member of the European Parliament for the south-east of France. She is a member of the Union for French Democracy, which is part of the Alliance of Liberals and Democrats for Europe, and sits on the European Parliament's Committee on Culture and Education and its Committee on Women's Rights and Gender Equality.

She is also a member of the delegation to the EU–Bulgaria Joint Parliamentary Committee and a substitute for the delegation for relations with Japan.

== Career ==
- Baccalaureate
- First prize for violin at the Le Mans conservatory of music (1958)
- Prize for harmony, fugue, counterpoint, aesthetics and the history of music, Paris Higher National Conservatory of Music (CNSM) (1968)
- First prize for conducting the CNSM orchestra, Paris (1969)
- Conductor of the Opéra orchestra, Lyon
- director of vocal training (solo and choral), Opéra of Lyon (1971–1978)
- Conductor of the Chambéry and Savoy orchestra (1977–1984)
- Musical director of Musica per Roma (2000–2002)
- Numerous concerts in Europe and the United States
- Knight of the National Order of Merit
- Knight of the Legion of Honour
- Officer of the Ordre des Palmes académiques

=== Political career ===
Since 2004 Claire Gibault has been an MEP, a member of the Committee on Culture and Education and of the Committee on Women's Rights and Gender Equality. She was rapporteur for a draft report on the social status of artists in Europe, approved by a large majority in June 2007.

Claire Gibault tries to defend modern feminism in order to give women the opportunity to have the same chances of success as men. This is what she is committed to within the European Parliament's Women's Rights Committee, on matters concerning women and poverty, the reconciliation of working life and family life or women migrants.

=== Artistic career ===
Born in Le Mans, that is where Claire Gibault began her studies. She won first prize for violin and chamber music at the Le Mans Conservatory before going to the Paris Higher National Conservatory of Music where she received first prizes for Orchestra Conducting, Harmony, Fugue and Counterpoint.

From 1976 to 1983 she was music director of the Chamber Orchestra of Chambéry, and from 1983 to 1989 assistant to John Eliot Gardiner, then music director of the Orchestra of the Opéra National de Lyon.

In 1995, she became the first woman to conduct the La Scala orchestra on the occasion of the creation of the opera La Station Thermale by Fabio Vacchi and in 1997 she conducted the musicians of the Berlin Philharmonic Orchestra with the opera Jacob Lenz by Wolfgang Rihm.

She was in charge of the Lyrical and Choral Workshop of the Opéra de Lyon between 1991 and 1998. There she was responsible for the musical direction of numerous productions, notably Pelléas et Mélisande, Il Barbiere di Siviglia, La Cenerentola, Die Entführung aus dem Serail, La Finta Giardiniera, Roméo et Juliette by Berlioz, L'Orfeo by Monteverdi, Les Brigands by Offenbach, L'Heure espagnole and L'Enfant et les Sortilèges by Ravel, Haydn's Il Mondo della luna, Gluck's Iphigénie en Tauride, The Rape of Lucretia by Britten and Le Chapeau de paille d'Italie by Nina Rota, whilst La Station Thermale (recorded by Ricordi) and Les Oiseaux de Passage by Fabio Vacchi and Dédale by Hugues Dufourt (recorded on CD by MFA/Radio France) are among her world creations.

Between January 2000 and 2002, she was music director of Musica per Roma, where she created the Laboratorio Voci in Musica. Presented there with her conducting were Mozart's Cosi fan tutte and Die Entführung aus dem Serail, Henze's Pollicino, Humperdinck's Hänsel und Gretel and Bernstein's West Side Story.

She has also conducted Pelléas et Mélisande (Covent Garden, London), Le Comte Ory (Glyndebourne Festival), Cosi fan tutte (Opera North), Chabrier's L'étoile (Edinburgh Festival), Zaïde and Der Schauspieldirektor (Bastille), L'Enfant et les Sortilèges (Châtelet), Boîeldieu's La Dame Blanche (Opéra-Comique, Paris), Mitridate, La Donna del lago, Die Zauberflöte, Le Nozze di Figaro and Bastien und Bastienne (Nice), La Clemenza di Tito (Orléans), La Traviata (Nancy), Idomeneo and Cosi fan tutte (Liège), Maria Stuarda (Torino), La Cenerentola (Rome) and Les Oiseaux de passage (Bologna).

She was Claudio Abbado's assistant for Pelléas et Mélisande at the Royal Opera House, La Scala and the Vienna Opera House.

In November 2002, she made her debut at the Washington Opera, conducting Mozart's Idomeneo with Plácido Domingo in the title role.

In February 2003, she conducted a world creation of Fabio Vacchi at the Maggio Musicale Fiorentino and in March 2004 she conducted the Copenhagen Philharmonic for the first time.

In 2005, she adapted into French and conducted Henze's Pollicino at the Châtelet theatre.

During the same season, she conducted concerts with the Orchestra Mozart Bologna and the Sofia Philharmonic Orchestra, and recorded Fabio Vacchi's music for the film Gabrielle by Patrice Chéreau. In 2006, she conducted the New Year concert with the orchestra of the Antwerp Opera, in February the Luxembourg Philharmonic Orchestra, in March the Orchestra Mozart Bologna, in April the Savoie Orchestra, and in May the opera Peter Pan by Patrick Burgan at the Châtelet theatre.

Drawing on her experience with Claudio Abbado and his Mozart Orchestra, Claire Gibault founded the Paris Mozart Orchestra in 2011, with which she currently performs around thirty concerts a year (Théâtre du Châtelet, Philharmonie de Paris, Seine Musicale, Arsenal de Metz, etc.). Deeply committed to new music, she regularly collaborates with contemporary composers such as Graciane Finzi, Wolfgang Rihm, Silvia Colasanti, Fabio Vacchi, Édith Canat de Chizy, Philippe Hersant, Benoît Menut, and others. In 2022, Claire Gibault signed an agreement with the city of Bourges, where the Paris Mozart Orchestra established its residency.

Claire Gibault has conducted concerts all over France and in Italy, Switzerland, Belgium, Canada and the United States. She has been invited by the Halle Orchestra, the Royal Scottish National Orchestra, the RTÉ National Symphony Orchestra, the RAI Sinfonica Nazionale Orchestra, the National Orchestra of Belgium and the Liège Philharmonic Orchestra. She has recorded works by Beethoven and Schubert with the Royal Philharmonic Orchestra. She has also worked in Denmark with the Copenhagen Philharmonic Orchestra and in Sweden with the Våsterås Sinfonietta.

=== Decorations ===
Claire Gibault has received the insignia of Officier of the Palmes académiques and is Chevalier of the Ordre national du mérite and of the Légion d'honneur. On 2 February 2005, she was given an honorary doctorate by the Catholic University of Louvain, along with Wim Wenders and Jorge Semprun.

== Personal life ==
She is the adoptive mother of two Togolese children.

She converted to Orthodox Christianity.
