= Adrien Giraud =

French politician

Adrien Giraud (4 October 1936 – 24 May 2018) was a French politician who was a member of the Senate of France, representing the island of Mayotte. He was a member of the Centrist Union.
