= Jean Arthuis =

French politician (born 1944)

Jean Arthuis MEP
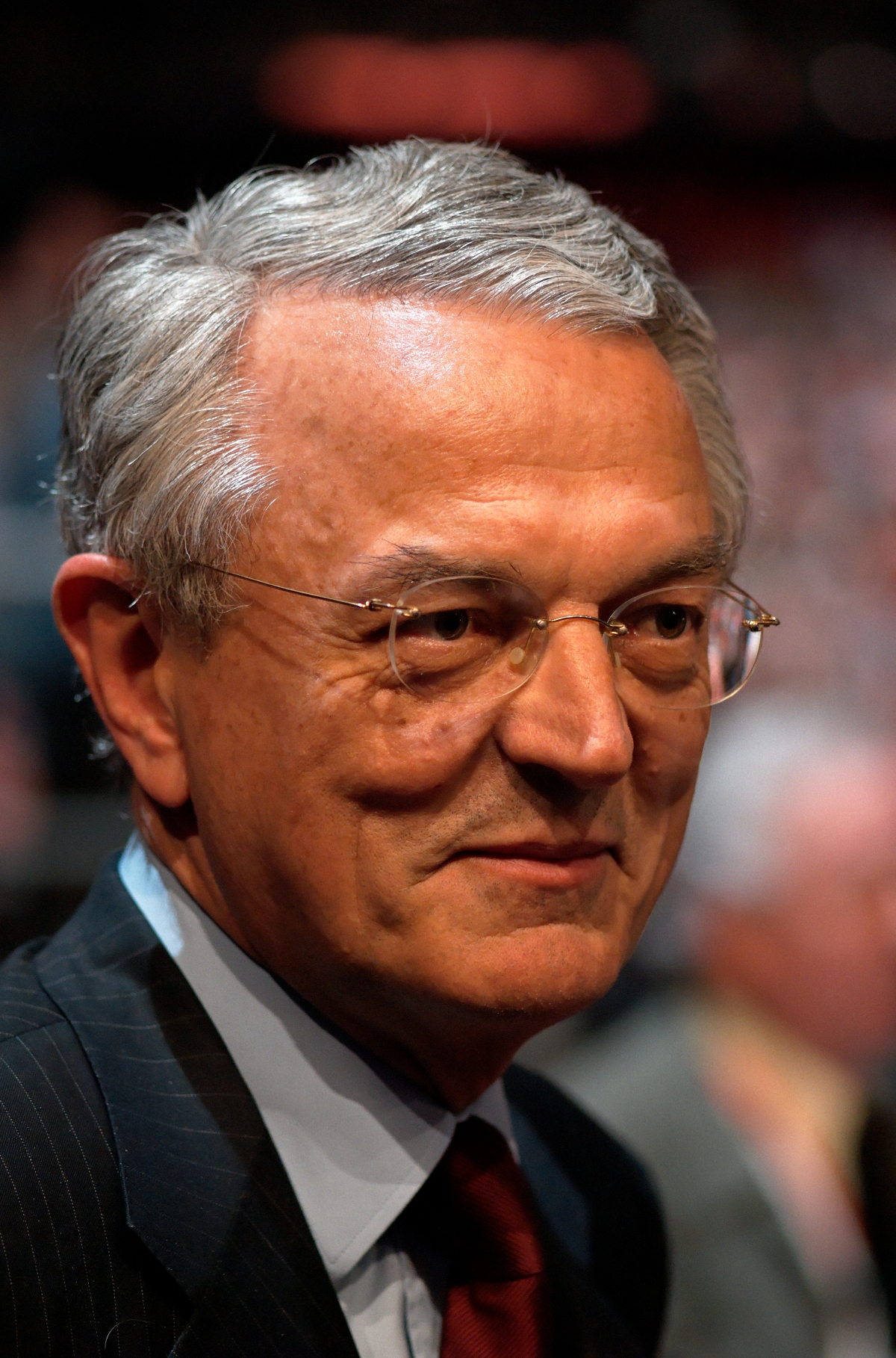

Chair of the European Parliament Budget Committee
- In office 7 July 2014 – 2019
- Preceded by: Alain Lamassoure

Member of the European Parliament
- In office 1 July 2014 – 2019
- Constituency: West France

Member of the French Senate
- In office 26 September 1995 – 30 September 2014
- Constituency: Mayenne

Minister of the Economy and Finances
- In office 12 April 1995 – 22 March 1997
- President: Jacques Chirac
- Prime Minister: Alain Juppé
- Preceded by: Alain Madelin
- Succeeded by: Dominique Strauss-Kahn

Personal details
- Born: Jean Georges Arthuis; 7 October 1944 (age 81) Saint-Martin-du-Bois, France
- Party: French: Centrist Alliance; EU; ALDE
- Education: Audencia Business School; Sciences Po
- Website: www.jean-arthuis.eu

Jean Arthuis (French pronunciation: [ʒɑ̃ aʁtɥi]; born 7 October 1944 in Saint-Martin-du-Bois, Maine-et-Loire) is a French politician. Over the course of career, he has held various ministerial positions and served as Member of the European Parliament from France, where he chaired the Committee on Budgets. He also serves as Senator representing Mayenne in the French Parliament.

He is the President of the Centrist Alliance political party and was a member of the ALDE group in the European Parliament.

== Early life and education ==
Arthuis was born in 1944 in the Loire region of north-west France, where his parents ran a poultry business. He went to school in Château-Gontier, to which he returned after studying at the École Supérieure de Commerce in Nantes and Sciences Po in Paris. In 1971 he set up an accountancy business in the town.

== Political career ==
=== Career in French politics ===
When Jacques Chirac became president in 1995, Arthuis returned to government under prime minister Alain Juppé. Initially in charge of economic planning, he was later promoted to finance minister, succeeding Alain Madelin. He represented France in negotiating the EU’s Stability and Growth Pact, including crucial agreements at the Dublin summit in 1996.

In early 1996, Arthuis and his German counterpart Theo Waigel launched a French-German economic stimulus package aimed at encouraging spending, increasing growth, cutting taxes on business and reducing unemployment.

Under a plan announced by Arthuis in 1996, the state-run bank Caisse des dépôts et consignations bought more than two-thirds of the shares of nearly bankrupt property lender Crédit Foncier de France and transfer its assets to another state-run entity, which was to liquidate them over 10 years; although Crédit Foncier was not state-owned, the government had to rescue it not only because of its large exposure to the bond market but also because many French people considered its shares to be among the most steady and risk-free.

That same year, Arthuis called for an investigation of former top executives at the state-controlled bank Credit Lyonnais for concealing losses at one of its key units, Altus Finance.

In 2012, Arthuis authored a high-profile report on the future eurozone for Prime Minister François Fillon. In 2013, Jean-Louis Borloo of the Union of Democrats and Independents (UDI) included Arthuis in his shadow cabinet; in this capacity, he served as opposition counterpart to Minister of European Affairs Thierry Repentin.

=== Member of the European Parliament, 2014–2019 ===
Arthuis was a Member of the European Parliament (MEP) from the 2014 elections until 2019. In this capacity, he served as the chairman of the Committee on Budgets. In 2014, he was the Parliament’s lead negotiator on the 2015 budget of the European Union. In addition to his committee assignments, he was a member of the European Parliament Intergroup on Long Term Investment and Reindustrialisation and of the European Parliament Intergroup on Children’s Rights.

In a 2015 letter to Martin Schulz, the President of the European Parliament, and Jerzy Buzek, the head of the Conference of Committee Chairs, Arthuis argued his committee should take a greater role in economic governance of the eurozone.

Arthuis publicly endorsed Emmanuel Macron in the 2017 French presidential elections.

== Other activities ==
- Société du Cheval Français, Member

== Recognition ==
- Order of Merit of the Federal Republic of Germany

Political offices
| Preceded by Alain Madelin | Minister of the Economy, Finances and Industry; 1995-1997 | Succeeded by Dominique Strauss-Kahn |
