= Françoise Férat =

French politician (born 1949)

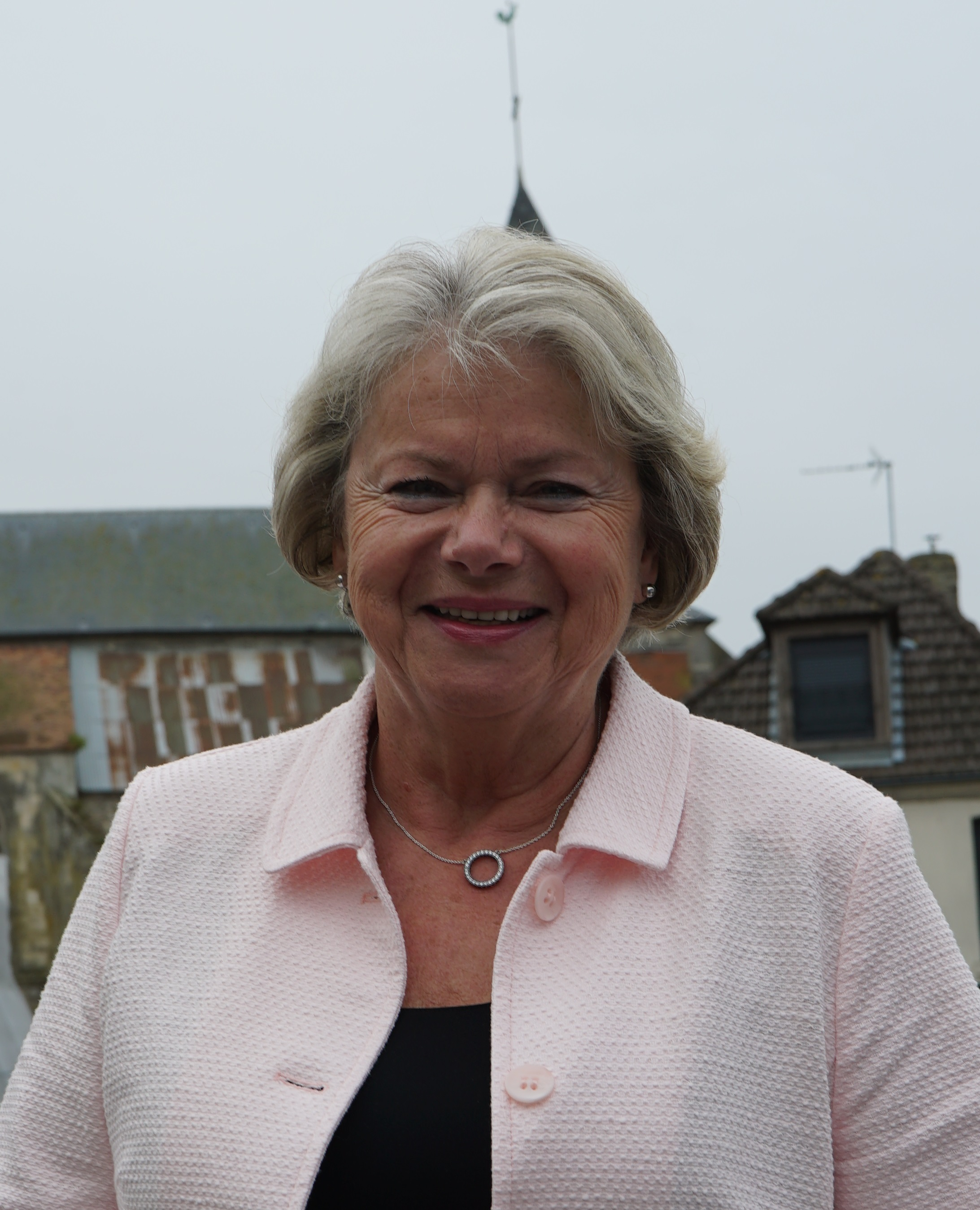
- Françoise Férat in 2017

Member of the French Senate for Marne
- Incumbent
- Assumed office 1 October 2001

Personal details
- Born: 5 March 1949 (age 77) Épernay, France
- Party: MoDem; Centrist Alliance; UDI

Françoise Férat (French: [fʁɑ̃swaz feʁa]; born 5 March 1949) is a French politician and a member of the Senate of France. She represents the Marne department and is a member of the Centrist Alliance.

== Biography ==
A former member of the MoDem, she announced on May 8, 2008 that she was "retiring" from the party, without leaving it. In October 2009, she joined the Alliance Centrist party founded by Jean Arthuis, Senator for Mayenne.

She was elected senator for the Marne region on September 23, 2001, where she is secretary of the culture, education and communication commission.

She supported Alain Juppé for the 2016 Republican presidential primary.

In the 2017 senatorial elections, Françoise Férat was re-elected for a further term. The "Union de la droite et du center" list she was on won all three seats in the Marne department, with 54.18% of the vote.
