= Anne-Marie Payet =

French politician (born 1949)

Member of the French Senate for Réunion
- In office 2001–2011
- Succeeded by: Jean-Paul Virapoullé

Personal details
- Born: 1 August 1949 (age 76) Réunion
- Party: MoDem

Anne-Marie Payet (born August 1, 1949) is a French politician. Between 2001 and 2011, she represented the island of Réunion as a member of the Senate of France.

== Biography ==
A school principal by profession and deputy mayor of Cilaos, she was elected senator for Réunion on September 23, 2001. A former member of the UDF and then the Democratic Movement (France), she sits with the Union Centriste group in the Senate. She is currently an Independent politician.

In the fall of 2005, she was one of the overseas parliamentarians who rallied together during the Olivier Grenouilleau affair.

Anne-Marie Payet is behind an Amendment that will lead to the inclusion of warnings about fetal alcohol syndrome on all alcohol bottles sold in France.

In the Senate, she is secretary of the Social Affairs Committee, a member of the delegation for women's rights and equal opportunities between men and women, and secretary of the Senate. She sits as a member on numerous study groups: the Arctic, Antarctic, and TAAF study group; the Forestry and Timber Industry study group; the Mountain Economic Development study group; the French Music and Song study group; the Sports study group; and the Thermalism and Climatotherapy study group.

She is also a member of the Commission for the Evaluation of Tax Exemption and Social Security Contribution Exemption Schemes in Overseas Territories, secretary of the French Section of the Parliamentary Assembly of the Francophonie (APF), member of the National Commission for the Evaluation of Overseas State Policies, member of the Supervisory board of the Fund for the Financing of Supplementary Protection for Universal Health Coverage, and member of the National Council for Policies to Combat Poverty and Social Exclusion.

She is the only member of the Senate to have voted against the law prohibiting the French ban on face covering.

She ran for the Senate elections on September 25, 2011, on Jean-Paul Virapoullé list, but was not re-elected.

She was made a Knight of the Legion of Honour in early 2012.

== Bibliography ==
- Page on the Senate website
