= Janelly Fourtou =

French politician (born 1939)

Janelly Fourtou (born 4 February 1939 in Paris) is a French politician and Member of the European Parliament for central France. She is a member of the Union for French Democracy, which is part of the Alliance of Liberals and Democrats for Europe, and sits on the European Parliament's Committee on Petitions and its Committee on the Internal Market and Consumer Protection.

She is also a substitute for the Committee on Legal Affairs, a member of the delegation to the EU–Chile Joint Parliamentary Committee, and a substitute for the delegation for relations with the countries of Central America.

== Career ==
In 1972 Fourtou received a Master's degree in language and literature. She works as an assistant at the Paris Chamber of Commerce from 1960 to 1964, then was in charge of bookshop Maison de la Presse in Paris from 1965 to 1969.

She was elected as a member of Neuilly Municipal Council in 1983, and had responsibility for housing from 1989 to 1995, and responsibility for employment from 1995. She was elected as a Member of the European Parliament in 1999.

Fourtou has been active in the EU Parliaments decisions regarding intellectual property rights. In 2004, she led the passage of a directive "after unofficial meetings with the Council working group and the Commission", suggesting among many other things up to four years of imprisonment for illegal file sharing. The directive also included an introduction of private police forces to enforce the law (in the EU member countries that should adopt the directive as-is).

== Personal life ==
Fourtou is married to Jean-René Fourtou, the CEO of Vivendi Universal.
