= The Centrists =

The Centrists – New Centre Les Centristes
- Leader: Hervé Morin
- Founder: Hervé Morin
- Founded: 29 May 2007 (as New Centre); 11 December 2016 (as The Centrists)
- Split from: Union for French Democracy
- Ideology: Conservative liberalism; Pro-Europeanism
- Political position: Centre-right
- National affiliation: UDI (2012–2017); UDC (2017–present)
- European Parliament group: European People's Party
- Colours: Light blue
- National Assembly: 2 / 577
- Senate: 8 / 348
- European Parliament: 0 / 81
- Presidency of Regional Councils: 1 / 17
- Presidency of Departmental Councils: 2 / 95

Website
- www.les-centristes.fr

The Centrists (French: Les Centristes, pronounced [le sɑ̃tʁist], LC), known as The Centrists – New Centre (Les Centristes – Nouveau Centre [le sɑ̃tʁist nuvo sɑ̃tʁ], LC-NC) since 2018, formerly known as New Centre (Nouveau Centre, NC) and European Social Liberal Party (Parti Social Libéral Européen [paʁti sɔsjal libeʁal øʁɔpeɛ̃], PSLE), is a centre-right political party in France formed by the members of the Union for French Democracy (UDF) – including 18 of the 29 members of the UDF in the National Assembly) – who did not agree with François Bayrou's decision to found the Democratic Movement (MoDem) and wanted to support the newly-elected president Nicolas Sarkozy, continuing the UDF–Union for a Popular Movement (UMP) alliance.

The party was founded on 29 May 2007 during a press conference and renamed on 11 December 2016.

== History ==
The Centrists trace their history to the major centrist and Christian-democratic political parties in the Fourth and Fifth Republics. The parties maintained a separate existence from the Gaullist parties in the early years of the Fifth Republic primarily because of de Gaulle's strong opposition to European integration. However the major centrist party, the Union for French Democracy (UDF), began to lose importance after UDF leader Valéry Giscard d'Estaing was defeated by François Mitterrand in the 1981 presidential election and as the Gaullist Rally for the Republic (RPR) become more pro-European during the 1980s and 1990s. In 2002, the RPR suggested a merger with the UDF but then–UDF leader Francois Bayrou refused. The RPR itself merged with smaller parties in 2002 to become the Union for a Popular Movement (UMP). At the same time, the UDF served as a junior partner for the UMP and supported UMP governments. UMP prime ministers usually appointed several UDF politicians to their governments to cement that support. In 2005, Bayrou became increasingly critical of the UMP government and ended his support of the Gaullist party in 2006. In the 2007 elections that followed, most UDF deputies running for reelection ran with the UMP in order to gain UMP support and ensure their prospects of reelection. The remains of the UDF renamed itself the New Centre and succeeded in electing 22 deputies to the National Assembly. Bayrou opposed the alliance with the UMP and formed a new party, the Democratic Movement (MoDem).

During the legislative elections in June 2007, 17 NC deputies were elected, in addition to five unaffiliated deputies elected under the "Majorité Présidentielle" banner. Only three MoDem deputies were elected, even though they won 7.6% of the first round vote and the NC-PSLE won about 2.3%. However, fewer than one hundred NC candidates were standing, compared to over 500 for the MoDem.

Minister of Defense Hervé Morin was elected by the first round in Eure (50.05%), other candidates such as François Sauvadet, Charles de Courson were also elected by the first round. In total, six NC-PSLE members were elected by round one.

In the second round, 11 additional deputies were elected, giving the party a total of 17 deputies. With other deputies elected under various banners, the party formed a parliamentary group of 22 members, including MoDem candidates Jean-Christophe Lagarde. Mayotte MoDem deputy Abdoulatifou Aly joined the group before defecting back to the MoDem. In a 2008 by-election in the Rhone, the party gained a seat after the UMP incumbent's election was invalidated.

In his second cabinet, the Prime Minister François Fillon appointed three NC members Hervé Morin as Defense Minister, André Santini as State Secretary for Public Servants and Valérie Létard as State Secretary for Social Solidarity.

The party held its foundation congress in Nîmes in 2008, where Hervé Morin was elected president of the party.

In the municipal and cantonal elections held in 2008, the party held most if its seats, but lost Blois and Amiens to the PS. It did gain, however, the cities of Agen and Châtellerault. It lost the department of the Somme but gained the Côte-d'Or, where François Sauvadet was elected as departmental president. In the 2009 European elections the party joined the presidential majority alliance and three NC members were elected as MEPs.

In May–June 2011 the party joined the Alliance with the Radical Party, as an alternative to the UMP.

== Ideology ==
The Centrists' political ideas are in large part inspired by those of François Bayrou in his 2007 presidential campaign.

It supports a social market economy, which seeks to find a compromise between socialism and laissez-faire capitalism. In this regard, it supports social welfare and a competitive market economy. It also supports a looser application of the French 35-hour workweek, a reduction in the payroll tax, a French equivalent to the American Small Business Administration and a reduction of the government debt and more budgetary regulation.

The Centrists supports a diversification of energy sources to cut by four greenhouse gas emissions by 2050. In this regard, it supports the development of public transit and further development of fluvial and railway transportation of goods and people.

It supports a greater role for the French Parliament and some in the party favour the introduction of a German-style mixed member proportional (MMP) system for parliamentary elections. Like many French centrist parties descended from the centrist Christian democratic ideals, it is strongly Europhilic and supports increased European control over the economy, environment, immigration, energy and research.

== Elected officials ==
- Ministers: Maurice Leroy
- Deputies: Jean-Pierre Abelin, Thierry Benoit (AC), Christian Blanc, Pascal Brindeau, Hervé de Charette, Charles de Courson, Stéphane Demilly, Jean Dionis du Séjour, Raymond Durand, Philippe Folliot (AC), Francis Hillmeyer, Michel Hunault, Olivier Jardé, Yvan Lachaud, Jean-Christophe Lagarde, Claude Leteurtre, Hervé Morin, Nicolas Perruchot, Jean-Luc Préel, François Rochebloine, Rudy Salles, André Santini, François Sauvadet, Francis Vercamer, Philippe Vigier
- Senators: Jean-Paul Amoudry, Claude Biwer, Jean Boyer, Daniel Dubois, Jean-Léonce Dupont, Hervé Maurey, Catherine Morin-Desailly, Jean-Jacques Pignard, Yves Pozzo di Borgo, André Villiers
- MEPs: Damien Abad, Sophie Briard-Auconie, Jean-Marie Cavada (AC)

== Leaders ==
Leader	Took office	Left office
Hervé Morin	2007	Incumbent

== Popular support ==
It is hard to pinpoint the geographic distribution of the LC's vote since most of its candidates run without UMP opposition. The party is strong institutionally in the Loir-et-Cher, where it holds two of the department's three seats and the presidency of the general council.

=== Departmental Council ===
Election year	Councils
2021	1 (Jean-Léonce Dupont)

=== National Assembly ===
French National Assembly
Election	Leader	Votes (round 1)	% (round 1)	Votes (round 2)	% (round 2)	Seats	+/–	Government
2007	Hervé Morin	616,440	2.37	433,057	2.12	22 / 577	New	Presidential Majority
2012	Hervé Morin	569,897	2.20	568,319	2.47	12 / 577	▼10	Opposition
2017	Hervé Morin	with Union of the Right and Centre				2 / 577	▼8	Opposition
2022	Hervé Morin	with Union of the Right and Centre				1 / 577	▼1	Opposition

=== European Parliament ===
European Parliament
Election	Leader	Votes	%	Seats	+/−	EP Group
2009 (Note: Run in a joint list with UMP and GM, that won 30 seats in total.)	Hervé Morin	4,799,908	27.88 (#1)	3 / 72	New	EPP
2014	Hervé Morin	Merged into UDI				
2019 (Note: Run in a joint list with LR and CPNT, that won 8 seats in total.)	Hervé Morin	1,920,407	8.48 (#4)	1 / 79	▲1	EPP
2024 (Note: Run in a joint list with LR, that won 6 seats in total.)	Hervé Morin	1,783,965	7.24 (#2)	0 / 81	▼1	−

== Financing ==
In order to obtain public financing, The Centrists have signed a convention with Fetia Api, a very small party in French Polynesia. 23 parliamentarians (18 of the French National Assembly and 5 from the Senate) declared they belong to Fetia Api for this reason.

== See also ==
- Category:The Centrists politicians
