= List of senators of Moselle =

Location of Moselle in France

Following is a list of senators of Moselle, people who have represented the department of Moselle in the Senate of France.

== Third Republic ==
Senators for Moselle under the French Third Republic were:

- Henri Collin (1920–1921)
- Maurice Bompard (1920–1933)
- Henri de Marguerie (1920–1933)
- Auguste Édouard Hirschauer (1920–1940)
- Jean Stuhl (1920–1940)
- Jean-Marie de Berthier de Sauvigny (1922–1926)
- Guy de Wendel (1927–1940)
- Édouard Corbedaine (1933–1940)
- Jules Wolff (1933–1940)

== Fourth Republic ==
Senators for Moselle under the French Fourth Republic were:

- Gabriel Hocquard (1946–1948)
- André Rausch (1946–1948)
- Pierre Muller (1946–1948)
- Jean-Éric Bousch (1948–1959)
- Paul Driant (1948–1959)
- René Schwartz (1948–1959)

== Fifth Republic ==
Senators for Moselle under the French Fifth Republic were:

| Period | Name | Party / Group | Notes |
|---|---|---|---|
| 1959–1965 | Jean-Éric Bousch | Union for the New Republic (UNR) | |
| 1959–1965 | Paul Driant | Union for the New Republic (UNR) | |
| 1959–1965 | René Jager | Popular Republican Movement (MRP) | |
| 1959–1965 | René Schwartz | Independent Republicans (RI) | |
| 1959–1965 | Pierre Fastinger | Independent Republicans (RI) | Replaced René Schwartz |
| 1965–1974 | Paul Driant | Centrist Union of Democrats for Progress (UCDP) | |
| 1965–1974 | René Jager | Centrist Union group (UC) | |
| 1965–1974 | Robert Schmitt | Independent Republicans (RI) | |
| 1965–1974 | Jean-Éric Bousch | Union for the New Republic (UNR) | |
| 1974–1983 | Jean-Marie Rausch | European Democratic and Social Rally group (RDSE) | |
| 1974–1983 | André Bohl | Centrist Union group (UC) | |
| 1974–1983 | René Jager | Centrist Union of Democrats for Progress (UCDP) | Died in 1983 |
| 1974–1983 | Rémi Cabocel | RASNAG | Replaced René Jager |
| 1974–1983 | Robert Schmitt | Independent Republicans (RI) | |
| 1983–1992 | Jean-Marie Rausch | European Democratic and Social Rally group (RDSE) | Appointed to cabinet in 1988 |
| 1983–1992 | Jean-Éric Bousch | Rally for the Republic (RPR) | Replaced Jean-Marie Rausch in 1988 |
| 1983–1992 | Roger Husson | Rally for the Republic (RPR) | |
| 1983–1992 | André Bohl | Centrist Union group (UC) | |
| 1983–1992 | Paul Souffrin | French Communist Party (PCF) | |
| 1983–1992 | Jean-Pierre Masseret | Socialist Party (PS) | |
| 1992–2001 | André Bohl | Centrist Union group (UC) | |
| 1992–2001 | Charles Metzinger | Socialist Party (PS) | |
| 1992–2001 | Jean-Pierre Masseret | Socialist Party (PS) | Appointed to cabinet in 1997 |
| 1992–2001 | Roger Hesling | Socialist and Republican group | From 1997, replacing Jean-Pierre Masseret |
| 1992–2001 | Jean-Marie Rausch | European Democratic and Social Rally group (RDSE) | |
| 1992–2001 | Roger Husson | Rally for the Republic (RPR) | Died in 2000 |
| 1992–2001 | Alain Hethener | Rally for the Republic (RPR) | Replaced Roger Husson in 2000 |
| 2001–2011 | Philippe Leroy | Union for a Popular Movement (UMP) | |
| 2001–2011 | Jean-Pierre Masseret | Socialist Party (PS) | |
| 2001–2011 | Jean-Louis Masson | Union for a Popular Movement (UMP) | |
| 2001–2011 | Gisèle Printz | Socialist Party (PS) | |
| 2001–2011 | Jean-Marc Todeschini | Socialist Party (PS) | |
| 2011–2017 | Philippe Leroy | Union for a Popular Movement (UMP) then The Republicans (LR) | |
| 2011–2017 | François Grosdidier | Union for a Popular Movement (UMP) then The Republicans (LR) | |
| 2011–2017 | Jean-Louis Masson | Miscellaneous right (DVD) | |
| 2011–2017 | Jean-Marc Todeschini | Socialist Party (PS) | Appointed to cabinet from 2014 to 2017 |
| 2011–2017 | Patrick Abate | Communist, Republican, Citizen and Ecologist group | Replaced Jean-Marc Todeschini from 2014 to 2017 |
| 2011–2017 | Gisèle Printz | Socialist Party (PS) | Resigned in 2014 |
| 2011–2017 | Jean-Pierre Masseret | La République En Marche (REM) | Replaced Gisèle Printz in 2014 |
| 2017–2023 | Christine Herzog | Miscellaneous right (DVD) | |
| 2017–2023 | François Grosdidier | The Republicans (LR) | |
| 2017–2023 | Jean-Louis Masson | Miscellaneous right (DVD) | |
| 2017–2023 | Jean-Marc Todeschini | Socialist Party (PS) | |
| 2017–2023 | Jean-Marie Mizzon | Miscellaneous right (DVD) – Centrist Union group (UC) | |

== Sources ==
- Liste des anciens sénateurs de la IIIème République par circonscription (in French), Sénat de France
- Liste des anciens sénateurs de la IVème République par circonscription (in French), Sénat de France
- Liste des anciens sénateurs de la Vème République par circonscription (in French), Sénat de France
- Liste par département - Moselle (in French), Sénat de France
