= Centrist Union group =

French Senate parliamentary group

Centrist Union Union centriste
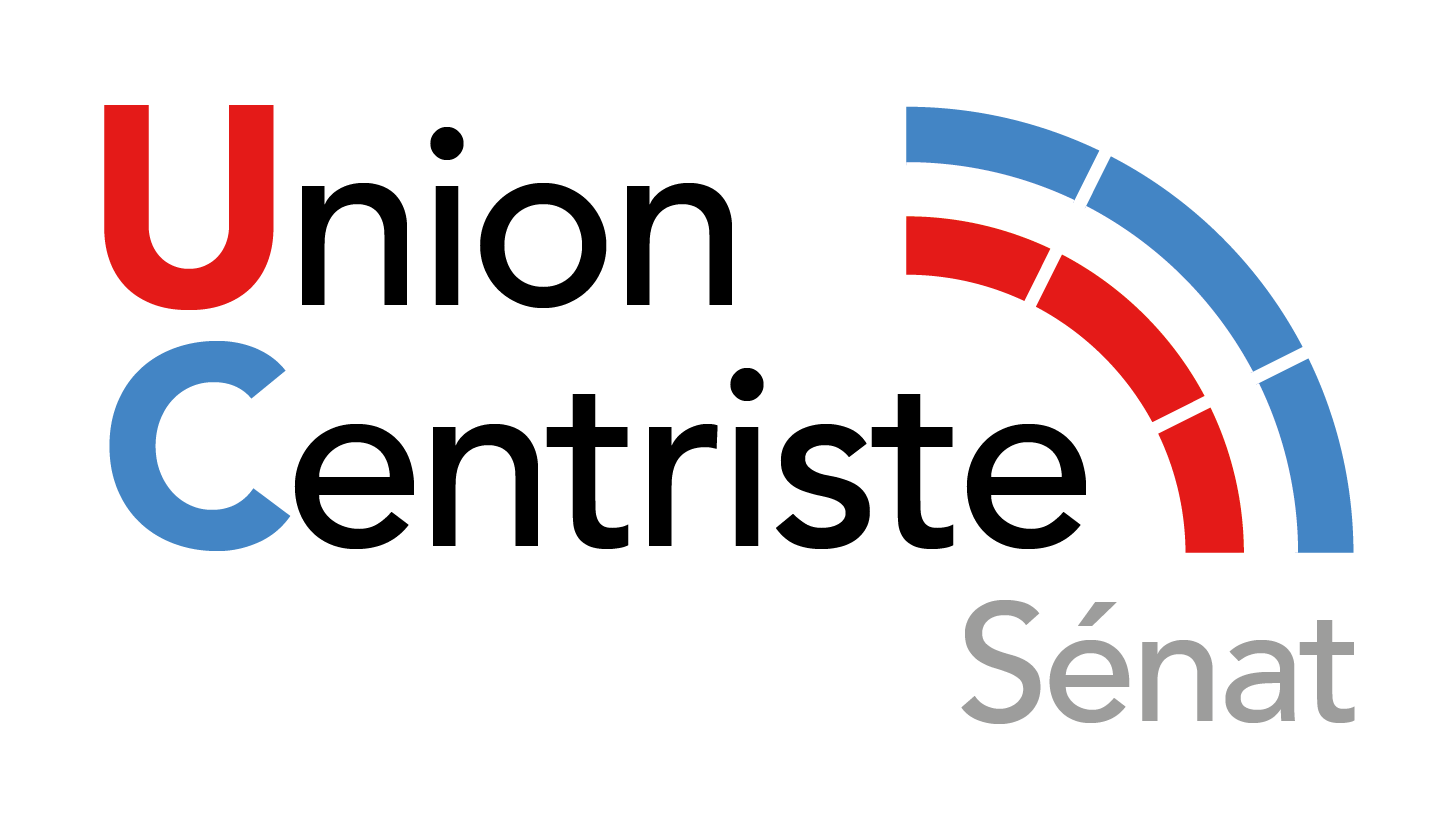
- Chamber: Senate
- Previous name(s): List: Popular Republicans group/Democratic Centre formation (1959–65) Groupe des Républicains populaires/Formation du Centre démocratique Popular Republicans and Democratic Centre group (1965–68) Groupe des Républicains populaires et du Centre démocratique Centrist Union of Democrats for Progress group (1968–84) Groupe de l'Union centriste des démocrates de progrès Centrist Union group (1984–2005) Groupe de l'Union centriste Centrist Union – Union for French Democracy group (2005–08) Groupe Union centriste – Union pour la démocratie française Centrist Union group (2008–11) Groupe Union centriste Centrist and Republican Union group (2011–12) Groupe Union centriste et républicaine Union of Democrats and Independents – UC group (2012–17) Groupe Union des démocrates et indépendants – UC Union of Democrats and Independents – Centrist Union group (2017) Groupe Union des démocrates et indépendants – Union centriste
- Member parties: UDI; MoDem; AC
- President: Hervé Marseille
- Constituency: Hauts-de-Seine
- Representation: 63 / 348
- Ideology: Liberalism
- Website: http://udi-uc-senat.fr/

The Centrist Union (French: Union centriste, abbreviated UC) is a centrist parliamentary group in the Senate uniting members of the Union of Democrats and Independents (UDI) and Democratic Movement (MoDem), as well as the Centrist Alliance (AC), a former component of the UDI. The group was historically associated with the Popular Republican Movement (MRP) and later the Democratic Centre (CD), Centre of Social Democrats (CDS), and Union for French Democracy (UDF). Most recently, from 2012 to 2017, it was known as the Union of Democrats and Independents – UC group (French: groupe Union des démocrates et indépendants – UC, abbreviated UDI–UC).

== History ==
In the first election of the Council of the Republic of the Fourth Republic, the Popular Republican Movement (MRP) group (groupe du Mouvement républicain populaire) obtained 76 seats, a quarter of the upper chamber, following senatorial elections on 8 December 1946. During the debate on the existence of the upper chamber, the MRP advocated for a bicameral system in which both the roles and modes of election of the two houses were clearly distinguished from each other, calling for the replacement of the system of indirect universal suffrage to select electors with greater representation of local collectivities. This proposal eventually prevailed despite the reluctance of certain members of the MRP, cognizant of the fact that such a system would favor it significantly less. Indeed, with a lack of representation at the local level as a result of the 1947 municipal elections in which the newly-founded Rally of the French People (RPF) of Charles de Gaulle secured a massive victory (the RPF having deprived the MRP of its flag as the party of the resistance), the MRP was reduced to just 22 seats following the senatorial elections of 7 November 1948. and never regained its former strength through the duration of the republic, with 24 seats following senatorial elections on 18 May 1952, 21 seats following senatorial elections on 19 June 1955, and 23 seats following senatorial elections on 8 June 1958.

In the Fifth Republic, the group was reincarnated as the Popular Republicans group (groupe des Républicains populaires), presided over by Alain Poher, with the Democratic Centre formation (formation du Centre démocratique) administratively attached to it, with Yvon Coudé du Foresto serving as its secretary. In January 1959, the MRP received a proposal from the Rally of Democratic Forces (Rassemblement des forces démocratiques, abbreviated RFD) envisaging the "establishment in France of a very large rally inspired by an ideal of political, economic, and social democracy", with the RFD consisting of a number of members of Catholic youth movements, some part of the MRP, including Rémy Montagne, Michel Debatisse, Bernard Lambert, and Nestor Rombeaut. Negotiations began immediately and significant progress was made until the issue of the denomination of the movement was raised, with its general secretary Maurice-André Simmonet objecting, noting that the name was popular with voters. In the 1959 renewal, the group secured 34 seats, an achievement aided by the increased strength of the MRP within metropolitan France, especially at the level of municipal and regional councils in rural areas; prior to that point, the strongholds of the MRP had largely been located in overseas France; with the MRP overwhelmed by the success of the RPF in the 1958 legislative elections, six former deputies, including four former ministers, found refuge in the Senate. The ranks of the group were filled with relatively young senators; as a result, it demonstrated greater dynamism, but also greater politicization, in its work.

In 1962, the MRP amended its statutes to indicate its openness to activist forces, marking the beginning of a rapprochement with the Democratic Center, which merged into the main group by 1965 to form the Popular Republicans and Democratic Centre group (groupe des Républicains populaires et du Centre démocratique, abbreviated RPCD). The same year, the divergences between the group and the senatorial majority became apparent over the issue of Algeria; though the Algerian cause was appreciated by the group, in which senators of French overseas territories and departments had traditionally constituted a significant part. However, the main reason that the group took issue with the governmental majority was the proposal to elect the president of the republic by universal suffrage, which consecrated the estrangement of the centrist group in the Senate and the government. The opposition of the group was linked to its centrist tendencies, which were in opposition to the referendum despite the support of the MRP for the government on paper; the referendum by its nature contradicted the fundamental liberal, European, and social values of the centrists.

The centrist group gradually became less closely connected to its associated party, with the senatorial group asserting its independence from the party. The group increasingly welcomed the accession of senators not members of the MRP but supported the decisions of the new majority within the group. Following the cessation of activities of the MRP after the 1967 legislative elections in which it called to support the Democratic Centre, the MRP ceased all political activities, and the senators subsequently took upon the appellation of the Centrist Union of Democrats for Progress group (groupe de l'Union centriste des démocrates de progrès). The growth of the group, which peaked in 1983, corresponded with the foundation of the Centre of Social Democrats (CDS) in 1976 by Jean Lecanuet, which remained independent of the activities of the senatorial group. However, from 1983, the independence of the group became more structural than political with the rise of the Rally for the Republic (RPR) group and the emergence of a senatorial majority that established a clear political position, either for or against the government.

In 1984, the group simply took upon the appellation of the Centrist Union group (groupe de l'Union centriste). From 29 January 1993, the Centrist Union no longer received direct public financing, which was instead paid to the "grouping of elected officials of the UDF" (groupement des élus de l'UDF), a political formation with the sole purpose of collecting and redistributing funds to the parties composing the Union for French Democracy (UDF), in addition to the "association of the Centrist Union" (association de l'Union centriste), founded in 1989 by the majority of senators in the group, that allowed the Centrist Union to collect public aid and direct it to political parties and formations, principally the UDF, Democratic Force (FD), and Centrist Union group.

The foundation of the Union for a Popular Movement (UMP) in 2002, and official constitution of a group in the Senate on 10 December, significantly reduced the ranks of the Centrist Union group, with 29 of its 54 members leaving for the newly-founded UMP group, with the group consisting of 27 members at the end of 2002. On 14 January 2005, the group was renamed to the Centrist Union – Union for French Democracy group (groupe Union centriste – Union pour la démocratie française, abbreviated UC–UDF), a denomination which it retained until 29 September 2008, when it became then Centrist Union group (groupe Union centriste). The group was renamed again in 2011, this time to become the Centrist and Republican Union group (groupe Union centriste et républicaine) after the arrival of three radicals of the UMP. In 2012, the Union of Democrats and Independents (UDI), uniting most of the parties of the centre – the Radical Party (PR) of Jean-Louis Borloo, the New Centre (NC) of Hervé Morin, Centrist Alliance (AC) of Jean Arthuis, Modern Left (LGM) of Jean-Marie Bockel, and Democratic European Force (FED) of Jean-Christophe Lagarde – was founded, notably without the participation of the Democratic Movement (MoDem) of François Bayrou, whose members are part of the senatorial group. and on 23 October the group was officially renamed to the Union of Democrats and Independents – UC group (groupe Union des démocrates et indépendants – UC), and briefly took upon its unabbreviated form in 2017, registered as the Union of Democrats and Independents – Centrist Union group (groupe Union des démocrates et indépendants – Union centriste).

After the Centrist Alliance announced its support for Emmanuel Macron in the 2017 presidential election, it was expelled from the UDI, though its senators remained within the group. On 3 July 2017, the UDI–UC group, chaired by François Zocchetto, voted in support of a motion placing the 42 members of the group within the presidential majority of Macron following his election, with 4 senators abstaining; this was in contrast to the decision of the deputies in the National Assembly part of The Constructives: Republicans, UDI, and Independents group, of which two-thirds abstained during the vote of confidence in the government. With a consensus among its senators to support the reform efforts of Macron, the group returned to its old denomination of the Centrist Union group (groupe Union centriste). As in the lower chamber, MoDem senators within the group decided not to join the La République En Marche group in the Senate, preferring to support the government within the existing centrist group. On 26 September, Hervé Marseille was elected the new president of the group following the renewal two days earlier.

== List of presidents ==
Name	Term start	Term end	Notes
Alain Poher	26 April 1959	8 December 1960	
Jean Lecanuet	8 December 1960	25 June 1963	
André Colin	25 June 1963	27 October 1971	
Roger Poudonson	27 October 1971	2 October 1974	
André Fosset	2 October 1974	2 April 1976	
Adolphe Chauvin	2 April 1976	2 April 1986	
Daniel Hoeffel	2 April 1986	2 April 1993	
Maurice Blin	6 April 1993	5 October 1998	
Jean Arthuis	5 October 1998	17 July 2002	
Xavier de Villepin	17 July 2002	10 December 2002	
Michel Mercier	10 December 2002	6 July 2009	
Nicolas About	7 July 2009	23 January 2011	
François Zocchetto	8 February 2011	26 September 2017	
Hervé Marseille	26 September 2017	present	

== Historical membership ==
Year	Seats	Change	Series	Notes
1959	34 / 307	Steady	–	
1962	35 / 274	▲1	A	
1965	38 / 274	▲3	B	
1968	47 / 283	▲9	C	
1971	46 / 283	▼1	A	
1974	55 / 283	▲9	B	
1977	61 / 295	▲6	C	
1980	67 / 305	▲6	A	
1983	71 / 317	▲4	B	
1986	70 / 319	▼1	C	
1989	68 / 321	▼2	A	
1992	66 / 321	▼2	B	
1995	59 / 321	▼7	C	
1998	52 / 321	▼7	A	
2001	53 / 321	▲1	B	
2004	32 / 331	▼21	C	
2008	29 / 343	▼3	A	
2011	31 / 348	▲2	1	
2014	43 / 348	▲12	2	
2017	49 / 348	▲6	1	
2020	54 / 348	▲5	2	

== See also ==
- Democratic Movement and affiliated group

== Bibliography ==
- Boyer, Vincent (2011). "Le Sénat, contre-pouvoir au bloc majoritaire ?". Revue française de droit constitutionnel. 85 (1): 41–68. doi:10.3917/rfdc.085.0041.
- Fondraz, Ludovic (2000). Les groupes parlementaires au Sénat sous la V^{e} République. Paris: Economica. ISBN 978-2-7178-4031-5.
- Georgi, Frank (1995). L'Invention de la CFDT 1957-1970 : syndicalisme, catholicisme et politique dans la France de l'expansion. Paris: Éditions de l'Atelier. ISBN 978-2-7082-3149-8.
- Letamendia, Pierre (1995). Le mouvement républicain populaire : le MRP, histoire d'un grand parti français. Paris: Éditions Beauchesne. ISBN 978-2-7010-1327-5.
