= 2017 French Senate election =

Election on 24 September 2017

← 2014	24 September 2017	2020 →

170 of 348 seats of the Senate 175 seats needed for a majority
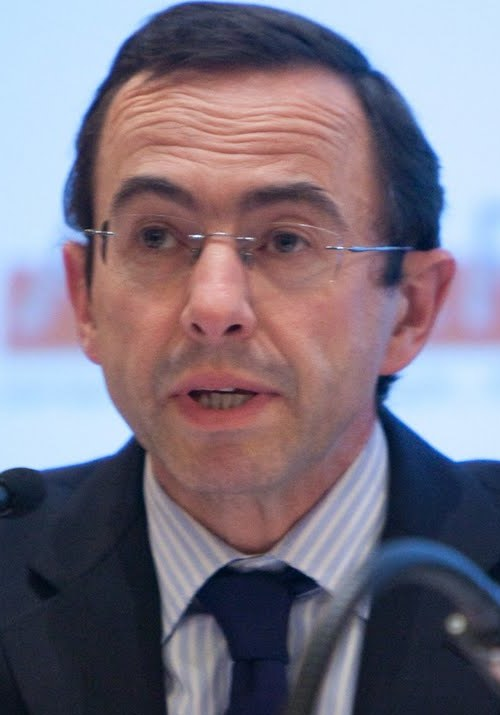

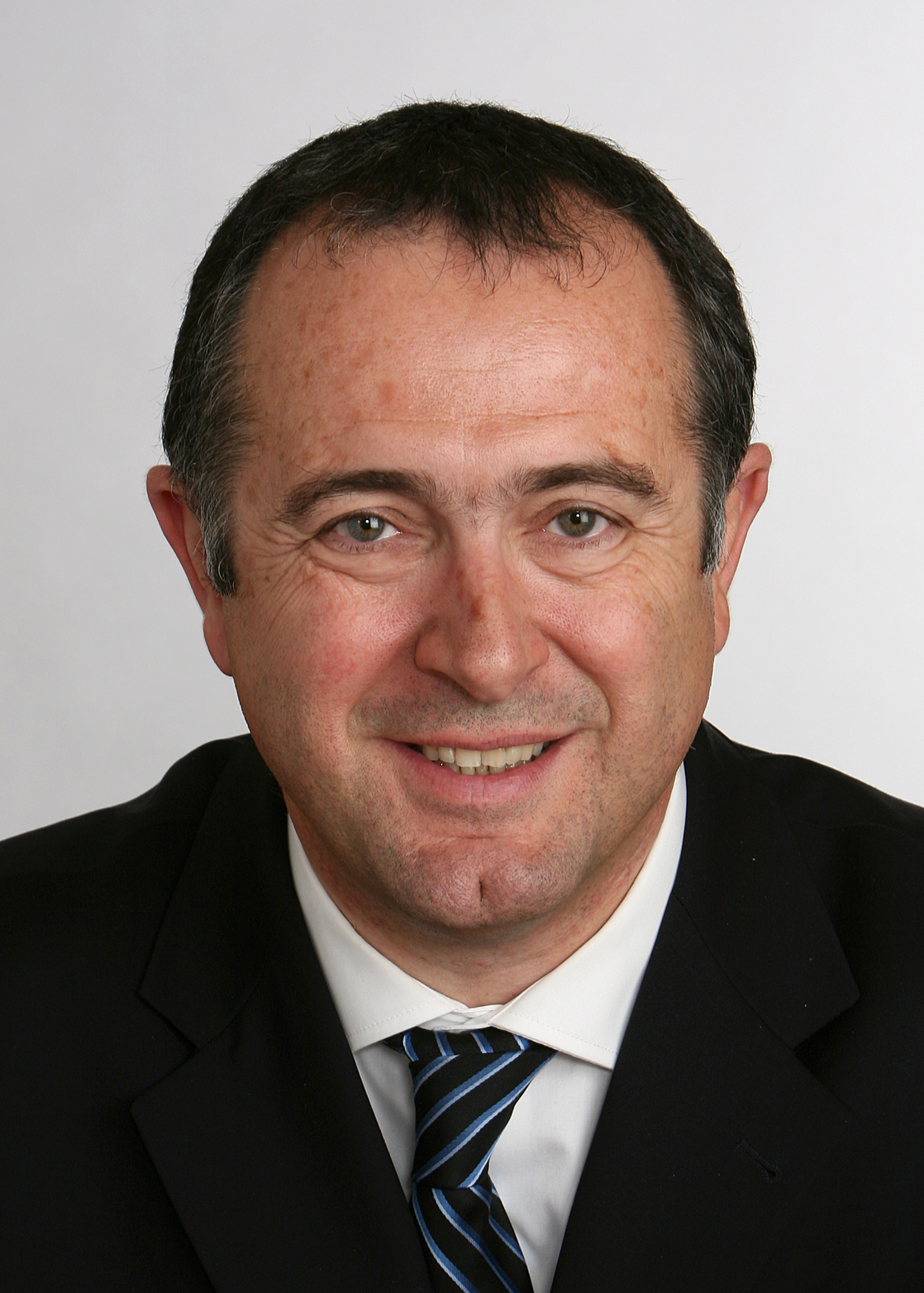

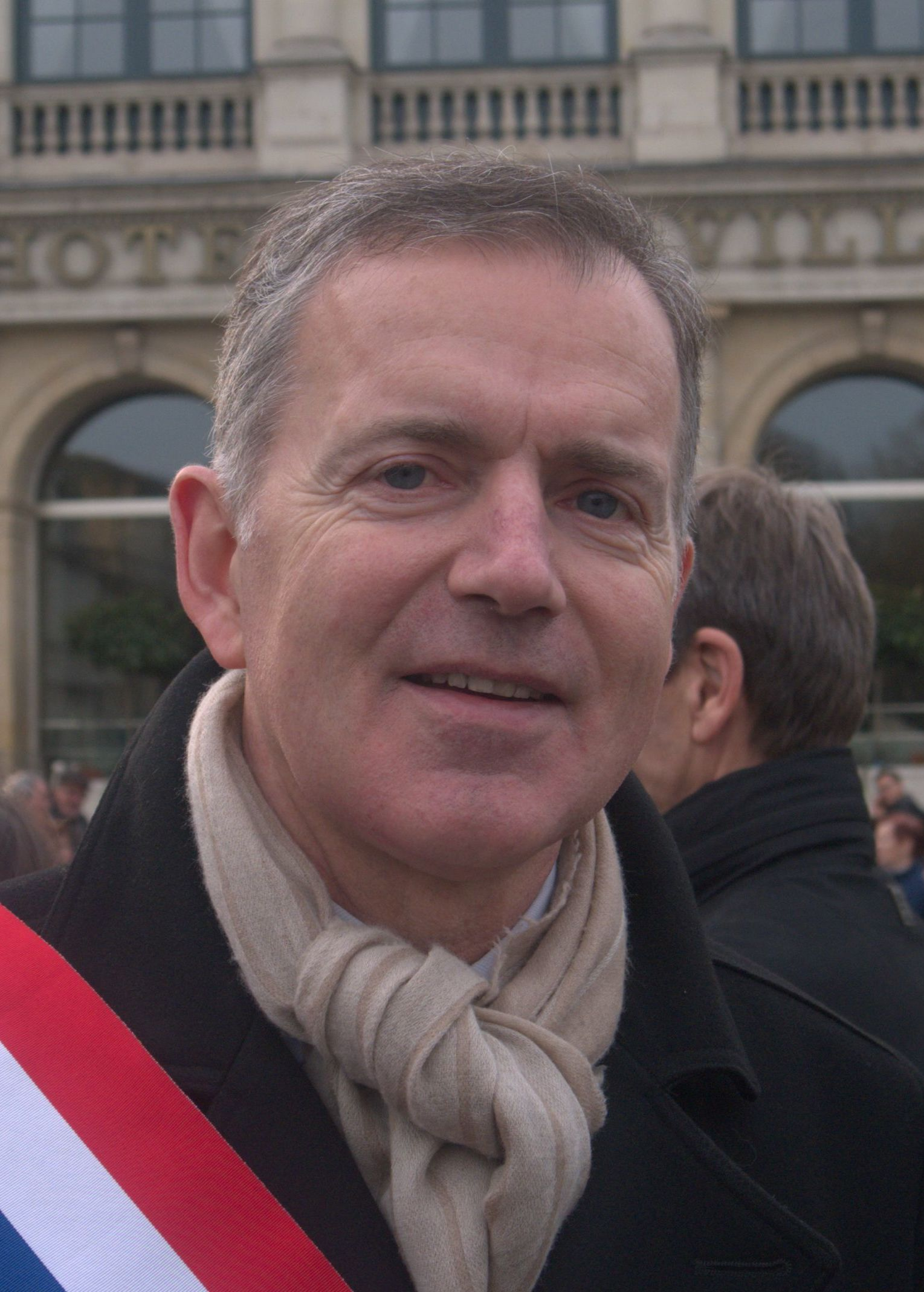

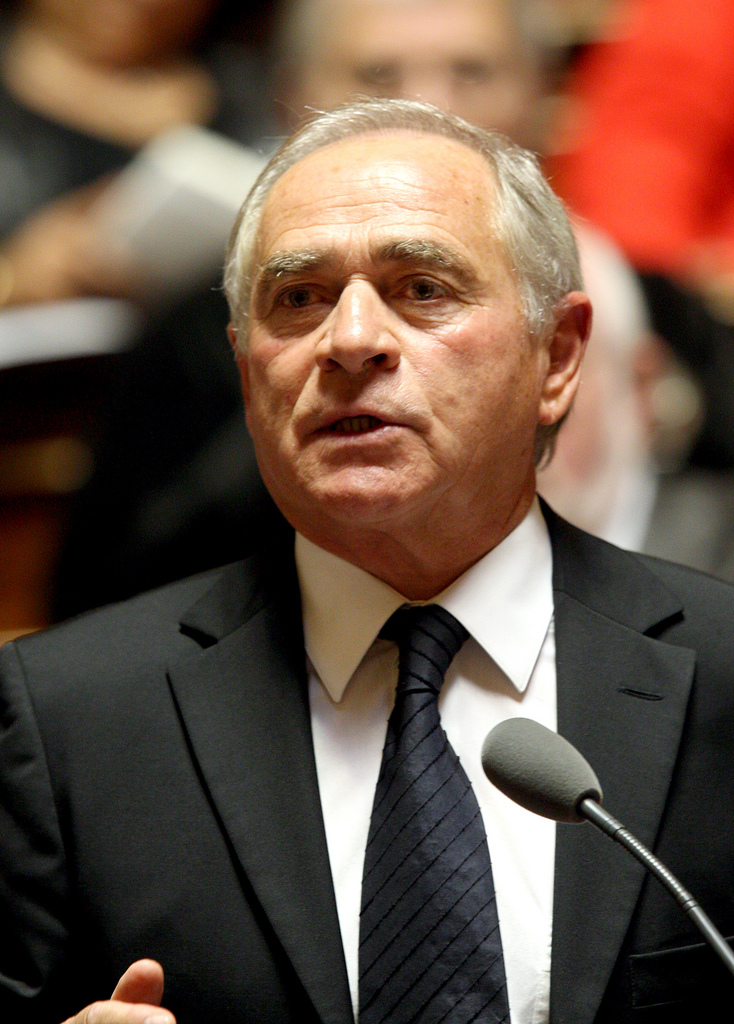

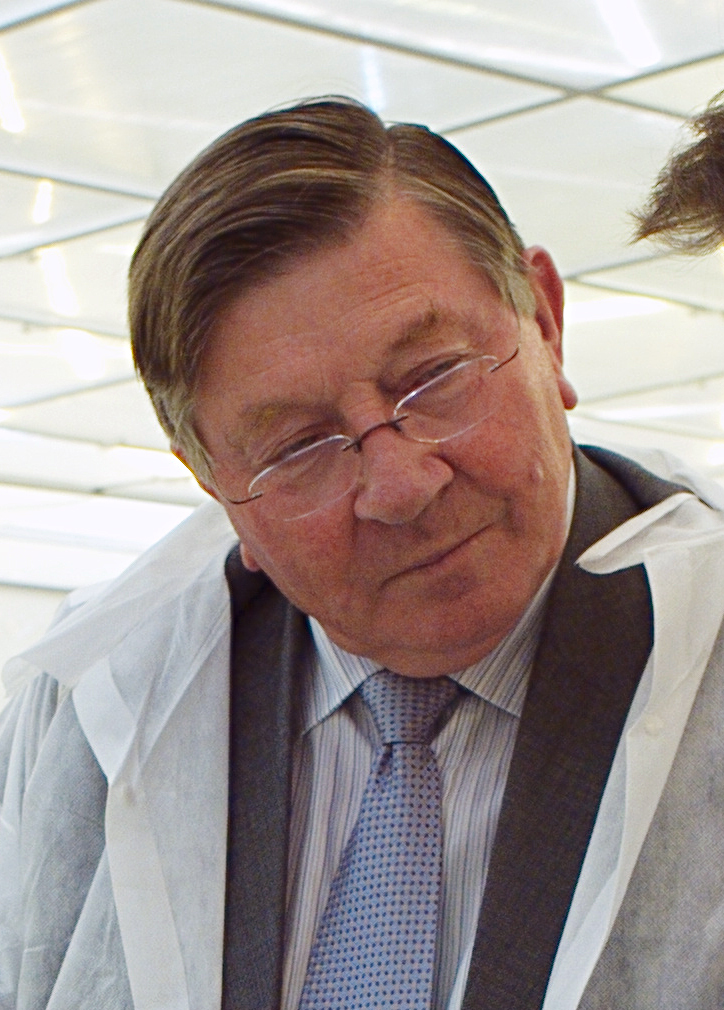

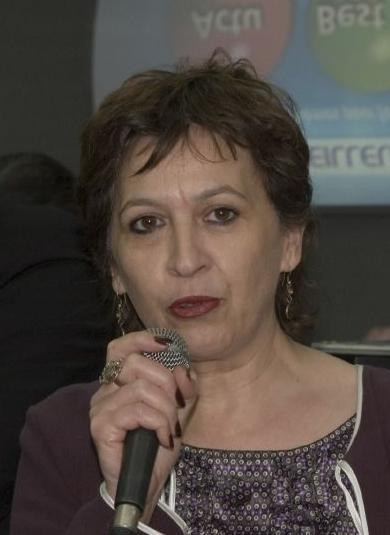

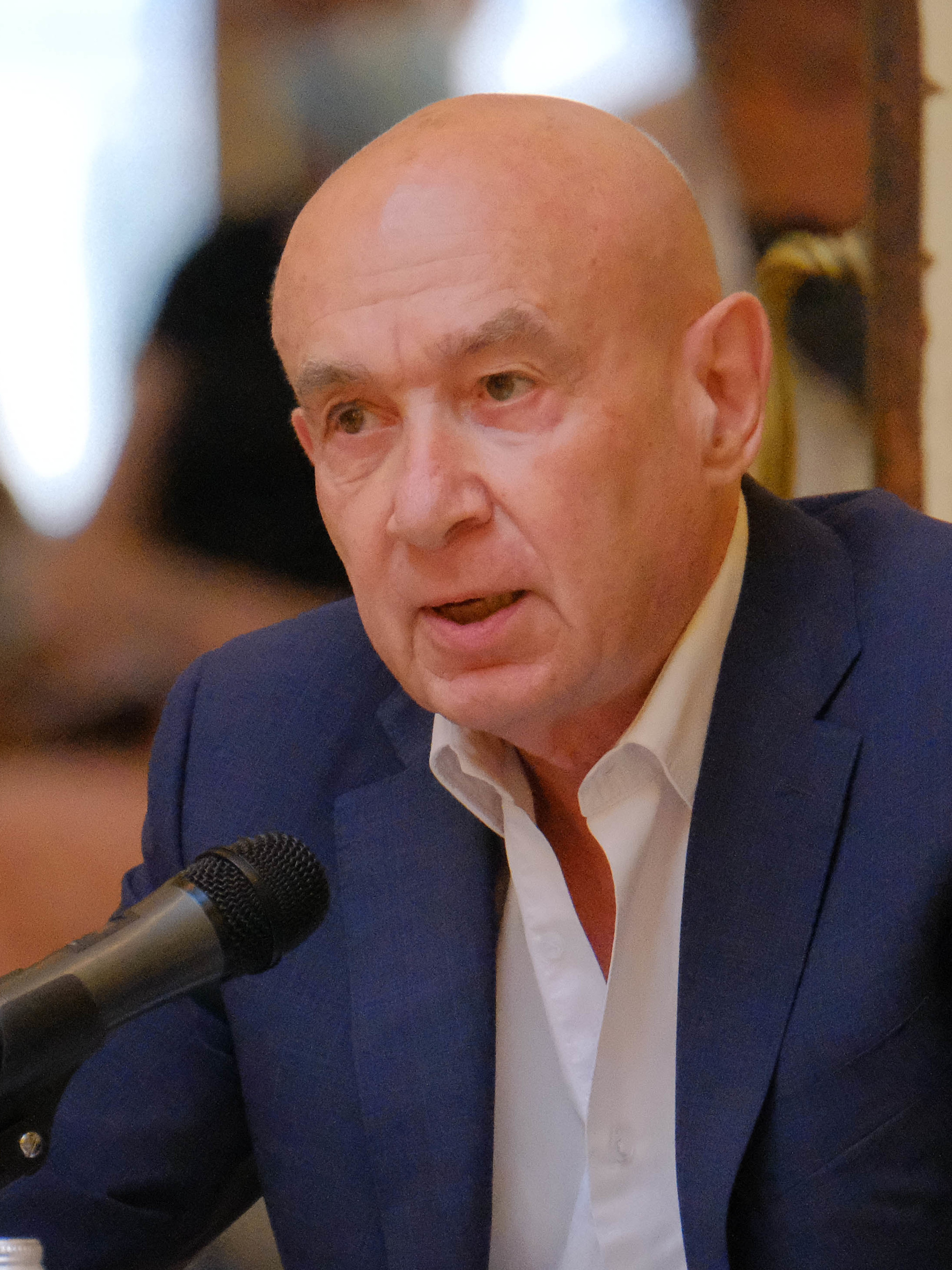
Leader	Bruno Retailleau	Didier Guillaume	François Zocchetto
Leader's seat	Vendée	Drôme	Mayenne
Last election	144 seats	111 seats	43 seats
Seats before	139	86	42
Seats after	146	78	49
Seat change	▲7	▼8	▲7
Group	LR	SOC	UC
Leader	François Patriat	Gilbert Barbier	Éliane Assassi
Leader's seat	Côte-d'Or	Jura	Seine-Saint-Denis
Last election	Did not exist	13 seats	18 seats
Seats before	29	16	18
Seats after	21	21	15
Seat change	▼8	▲5	▼3
Group	LREM	RDSE	CRC
Leader	Claude Malhuret
Leader's seat	Allier
Last election	Did not exist
Seats before	Did not exist
Seats after	11
Seat change	▲11
Group	RTLI
President of the Senate before election
Gérard Larcher
LR
Elected President of the Senate
Gérard Larcher
LR

Senatorial elections were held on 24 September 2017 to renew 170 of 348 seats in the Senate of the French Fifth Republic.

== Organisation ==
=== Senators concerned ===
Since 2011, the French Senate has been renewed, using two series, every three years. The senatorial elections on 24 September 2017 concern 170 outgoing senators within series 1 across 44 constituencies in addition to half the seats of senators representing French residents overseas. Specifically, the renewal includes seats representing 38 metropolitan departments numbered between 37 (Indre-et-Loire) and 66 (Pyrénées-Orientales), the departments of Île-de-France, four overseas departments (Guadeloupe, Martinique, Réunion, and Mayotte), two overseas collectivities (Saint Pierre and Miquelon and New Caledonia), and 6 of 12 sieges of senators representing French residents overseas. Of these seats, 136 are elected proportionally and 34 by majority. The vacant series 2 seat in Savoie will be filled separately with a by-election also held on 24 September.

=== Electoral system ===
Two methods are used to elect senators. The two-round majority vote is used in constituencies which elect 1 or 2 senators, affecting 18 constituencies and 34 seats in the 2017 elections. The candidate and their alternate must be of a different sex. In order to be elected in the first round, a candidate must secure an absolute majority of votes and a number of votes equal to at least a quarter of electors. If not, a second round is organized, in which case a relative majority will be enough for a candidate to be elected. In case of a tie, the oldest of the candidates is elected. Proportional representation is used in constituencies electing 3 or more senators; in the case of the 2017 elections, this affects 26 constituencies and 130 seats, in addition to the 6 seats for senators representing French residents overseas. Each list must be composed alternately of candidates of each sex.

Senators are elected through indirect universal suffrage by an electoral college composed of deputies, senators, regional councillors elected within a department, councillors of the Corsican Assembly designated under conditions set out within the electoral code, councillors of the Guianese Assembly, councillors of the Martinican Assembly, and departmental councillors. Delegates of municipal councils, however, make up the large majority of the electoral college, representing 95% of the 162,000 electors. The number of delegates of the municipal councils depends on the municipal population authenticated on 1 January 2014 by the census. Delegates must be French nationals and be registered on the electoral list of the municipality in question.

=== Candidates ===
The minimum age for candidates in the senatorial elections is 24 years. After the 2014 renewal, the average age of senators was 61 years. Since the law on the accumulation of mandates of 14 February 2014, parliamentary mandates have been considered incompatible with local executive functions (president or vice-president of regional or departmental councils, mayor or deputies to mayors, and similar offices). This rule applies to all senators elected, re-elected, or in office as of 2 October 2017.

== Results ==
Constituencies by election method Majoritarian Proportional Not concerned

=== Composition before renewal ===
Composition of the Senate as of 23 September 2017
Group	Renewable	% series 1	Total seats	% of total	President
LR	53	31.4%	139	38.1%	Bruno Retailleau
SOC	46	27.2%	86	53.5%	Didier Guillaume
UC	19	11.2%	42	45.2%	François Zocchetto
REM	19	11.2%	29	65.5%	François Patriat
CRC	16	9.5%	18	88.9%	Éliane Assassi
RDSE	7	4.1%	16	43.8%	Gilbert Barbier
RASNAG	9	5.3%	14	64.3%	Philippe Adnot (delegate)
Vacant (1 Savoie series 2 by-election)			3	–	–

=== Composition after renewal ===
Composition of the Senate as of 3 October 2017
Parliamentary group		Members	Associated	Attached	Total	President
LR	The Republicans	129	6	11	146	Bruno Retailleau
SOC	Socialist and Republican	78	0	0	78	Didier Guillaume
UC	Centrist Union	42	6	1	49	Hervé Marseille
REM	La République En Marche	19	1	1	21	François Patriat
RDSE	European Democratic and Social Rally	19	0	2	21	Jean-Claude Requier
CRCE	Communist, Republican, Citizen and Ecologist	12	0	3	15	Éliane Assassi
RTLI	Republic and Territories / The Independents	10	1	0	11	Claude Malhuret
RASNAG	Administrative meeting of senators not appearing on the list of any group	5	–	–	5	Philippe Adnot (delegate)

=== Election of president ===
Gérard Larcher was re-elected president of the Senate on 2 October 2017, challenged only by Didier Guillaume and Éliane Assassi.

Candidate	Group	Votes	%
Gérard Larcher	LR	223	70.35
Didier Guillaume	SOC	79	24.92
Éliane Assassi	CRCE	15	4.73
Electors		348	100.00
Abstentions		5	1.44
Votes		343	98.56
Blank votes		24	7.00
Null votes		2	0.57
Expressed votes		317	92.42

== See also ==
- 2017 French presidential election
- 2017 French legislative election
