= European Democratic and Social Rally group =

Parliamentary group in France

European Democratic and Social Rally group Groupe du Rassemblement démocratique et social européen
- Chamber: Senate
- Previous name(s): Democratic Left group (1959–89); Groupe de la Gauche démocratique Democratic and European Rally group (1989–95); Groupe du Rassemblement démocratique et européen
- Member parties: PRV; PRG
- President: Maryse Carrère
- Constituency: Lot
- Representation: 18 / 348
- Ideology: Liberalism; Social liberalism Pro-Europeanism

The European Democratic and Social Rally group (French: groupe du Rassemblement démocratique et social européen, abbreviated RDSE), formerly the Democratic and European Rally group (French: groupe du Rassemblement démocratique et européen), is a parliamentary group in the French Senate including representatives of the Radical Party of the Left (PRG) that historically consisted of radicals of both the left and right. Before 1989, the group was known as the Democratic Left group (French: groupe de la Gauche démocratique).

== History ==
The Democratic Left group in the Senate of the Third Republic was founded on 26 October 1891 in a meeting of some forty senators organized by Émile Combes during which Arthur Ranc was elected its first president. It is often considered "the first effort of unification of the radicals which will end in 1901 with the formation of the Radical Party", which was officially founded as the Republican, Radical and Radical-Socialist Party, the group uniting the radicals of the upper chamber even before the establishment of a political party. In 1907, the group adopted the denomination of the Democratic, Radical, and Radical-Socialist Left group (groupe de la Gauche démocratique radicale et radicale-socialiste), and rapidly became the majority group in the Senate, with 166 members by 1912. After the formal recognition of parliamentary groups in the Senate in 1921, the group consisted of 158 members following the renewal, and was presided over by Gaston Doumergue.

The group remained dominant through the end of the Third Republic, with 164 members under Jean-Baptiste Bienvenu-Martin following the 1924 renewal, 146 members after the 1927 renewal, 150 members after the 1929 renewal, 167 members after the 1932 renewal, 164 members after the 1935 renewal, and 151 members after the 1938 renewal. The group was highly influential in the politics of the Third Republic, defending the fundamental freedoms – freedom of expression, freedom of the press, and freedom of association – and produced a number of prominent political personalities, including Georges Clémenceau, Léon Bourgeois, Édouard Herriot, Gaston Doumergue, Joseph Caillaux, Albert Sarraut, and Henri Queuille, as well as four of the six senators who went on to become presidents of the Third Republic (Emile Loubet, Armand Fallières, Gaston Doumergue, and Paul Doumer).

In the Council of the Republic of the Fourth Republic, the group was initially reincarnated as the Rally of the Republican Lefts group (groupe du Rassemblement des gauches républicaines), with 42 seats following senatorial elections on 8 December 1946, and 86 seats following senatorial elections on 7 November 1948. The group, which envisaged a new rise of radical thought, was however a victim of the decline of radicalism, far from achieving its former heights, was subsequently renamed to the Rally of Republican Lefts and the Democratic Left group (groupe du Rassemblement des gauches républicaines et de la gauche démocratique) in 1949 and later the Democratic Left and the Rally of Republican Lefts group (groupe de la Gauche démocratique et du rassemblement des gauches républicaines) in 1952, and held 73 seats following senatorial elections on 18 May 1952, increasing to 77 seats following senatorial elections on 19 June 1955. The group returned to its original appellation of the Democratic Left group (groupe de la Gauche démocratique) in 1956, controlling 62 seats following the final senatorial elections of the Fourth Republic on 8 June 1958.

Though the group initially controlled 63 seats in the Senate of the Fifth Republic following the 1959 senatorial elections, the strong bipolarization of politics during the Fifth Republic rendered it difficult for the group to maintain its membership, which was gradually eroded over the following decades. Despite its difficulties, however, the group preserved its tradition of openness, accommodating the Algerian Democratic Rally (Rassemblement démocratique algérien) in 1961 as an associate of the group. In 1971, the Radical Party split into two factions, one centrist and the other favorable to a union with the left; from then on, the latter group sat with the socialists in the National Assembly, the lower chamber. In the Senate, however, the left-wing radicals continued to sit with their radical peers in the Democratic Left. Similarly, the "administrative formation of radicals of the left" (formation administrative des radicaux de gauche) which existed in the Senate from 1977 to 1986 was attached not to the socialist group but to the Democratic Left, and initially consisted of 14 senators following the 1977 renewal. The administrative formation disappeared from 1986 to 1989, and the radicals of the left resumed sitting within the main Democratic Left group.

In March 1989, the Democratic Left sacrificed its historical name for the sake of the political reality of the moment, taking upon the appellation of the Democratic and European Rally group (groupe du Rassemblement démocratique et européen). The group later adopted its current name, the European Democratic and Social Rally group (groupe du Rassemblement démocratique et social européen), or RDSE, in 1995, in acknowledgment of the six member senators of Radical, the party of left radicals, and the more "social" dimension of the group, marking the end of an era.

The modern RDSE group is unique in the freedom of its parliamentarians in voting, as a group consisting of members both favorable and opposed to the senatorial majority, and the respect accorded to every senator in their absolute freedom to determine their own vote. The internal political diversity required the group to maintain a system to manage votes in open sessions, with the group recording the votes of every member with a table requesting their intention to vote in the event of a public ballot, allowing the votes of every member to be known with precision. Divergences within the group are frequent, most of the time corresponding to the left/right divide within the group, with the group bound together not by common political parties but by common "political affinities". The group currently consists of 16 senators, with Gilbert Barbier, a member of The Republicans (LR), as its president since 23 May 2017. Though a majority of the group supported Emmanuel Macron in the 2017 presidential election, Jacques Mézard, the previous president of the group (who left the Senate to take up a ministerial post in the government), refused to consider the possibility of merging with the La République En Marche group in the Senate, wishing to preserve oldest group in the Senate and its spirit of independence. Jean-Claude Requier was elected the group's new president on 26 September, replacing Barbier, who chose not to seek to keep his seat in the preceding renewal, which saw the ranks of the group grow, with the rapprochement between the PRG and the Radicals bringing several members of the latter into the group.

== List of presidents ==
Name	Term start	Term end	Notes
Pierre de La Gontrie	26 April 1959	1 October 1968	
Lucien Grand	8 October 1968	8 May 1978	
Gaston Pams	15 June 1978	19 February 1981	
René Touzet	14 October 1981	18 November 1982	
Jacques Pelletier	8 December 1982	12 June 1988	
Josy Moinet	30 June 1988	1 October 1989	
Ernest Cartigny	5 October 1989	1 October 1995	
Guy-Pierre Cabanel	3 October 1995	30 September 2001	
Jacques Pelletier	2 October 2001	3 September 2007	
Pierre Laffitte	19 September 2007	30 September 2008	
Yvon Collin	2 October 2008	3 October 2011	
Jacques Mézard	4 October 2011	22 May 2017	
Gilbert Barbier	23 May 2017	26 September 2017	
Jean-Claude Requier	26 September 2017	present	

== Historical membership ==
Year	Seats	Change	Series	Notes
1959	63 / 307	Steady	–	
1962	50 / 274	▼13	A	
1965	50 / 274	Steady	B	
1968	43 / 283	▼7	C	
1971	38 / 283	▼5	A	
1974	35 / 283	▼3	B	
1977	40 / 295	▲5	C	
1980	39 / 305	▼1	A	
1983	39 / 317	Steady	B	
1986	35 / 319	▼4	C	
1989	23 / 321	▼12	A	
1992	23 / 321	Steady	B	
1995	24 / 321	▲1	C	
1998	21 / 321	▼3	A	
2001	20 / 321	▼1	B	
2004	16 / 331	▼4	C	
2008	17 / 343	▲1	A	
2011	16 / 348	▼1	1	
2014	13 / 348	▼3	2	
2017	21 / 348	▲8	1	
2020	15 / 348	▼6	2	

== Bibliography ==
- Fondraz, Ludovic (2000). Les groupes parlementaires au Sénat sous la V^{e} République. Paris: Economica.
- Boyer, Vincent (2007). La gauche et la seconde chambre de 1945 à nos jours. Paris: Éditions L'Harmattan.
- Vidal-Naquet, Ariane (2009). "L'institutionnalisation de l'opposition". Revue française de droit constitutionnel. 77 (1): 153–173.
