= Jean-Claude Requier =

French politician

Member of the French Senate for Lot
- In office 1 October 2011 – 2 October 2023

President of the RDSE group in the Senate
- In office 3 October 2017 – 2 October 2023
- Preceded by: Gilbert Barbier
- Succeeded by: Maryse Carrère

Personal details
- Born: 4 October 1947 (age 77); Martel, France
- Political party: Radical Party

Jean-Claude Requier (born 4 October 1947) is a French politician.

He was elected to the French Senate during the 2011 elections. He was reelected for a second term in 2017. He did not run for a third term in the 2023 elections.

He served as mayor of Martel, Lot from 1986 to 2014.
