= Marcelle Rumeau =

French politician

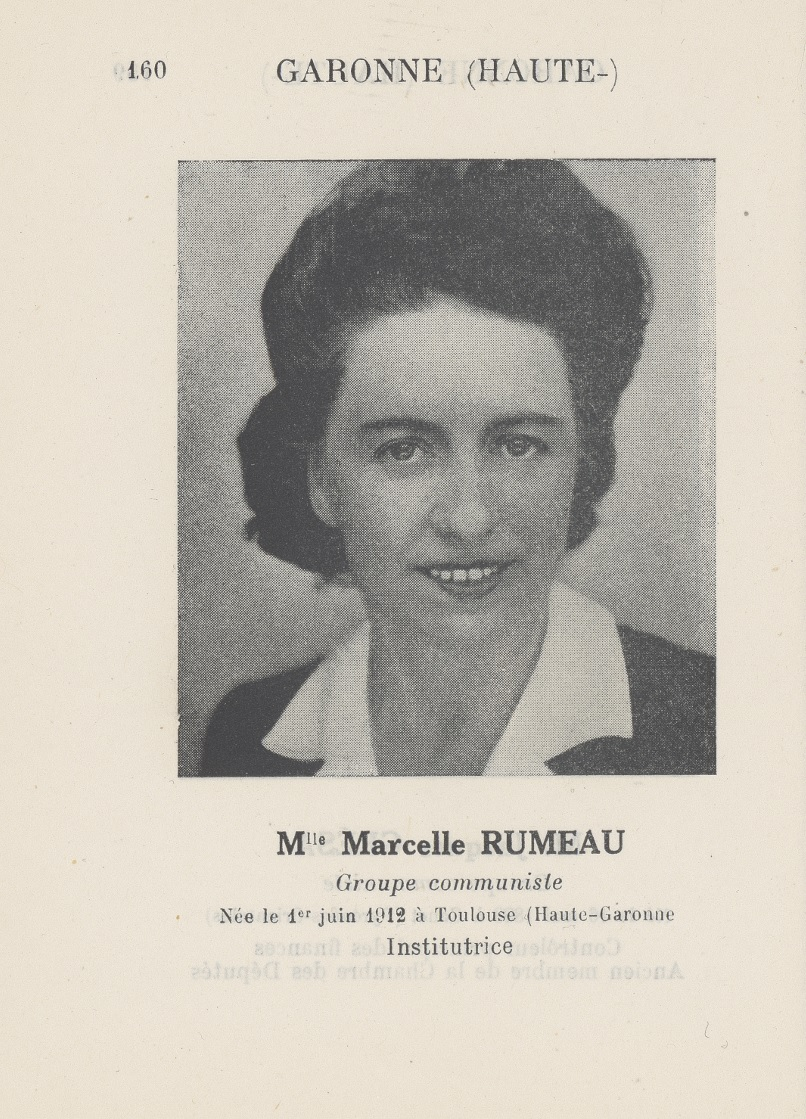

Member of the National Assembly
- In office 1945–1946
- In office 1946–1951
- In office 1956–1958
- Constituency: Haute-Garonne

Personal details
- Born: 1 June 1912 Toulouse, France
- Died: 1 March 1985 (aged 72) Toulouse, France

Marcelle Rumeau (1 June 1912 – 1 March 1985) was a French politician. She was elected to the National Assembly in October 1945 as one of the first group of French women in parliament. She went on to serve three non-consecutive terms in the National Assembly.

== Biography ==
Rumeau was born in Toulouse in 1912; her mother was a shopkeeper and her father an accountant. After finishing school, she attended the Normal School of Teachers of Haute-Garonne, qualifying as a teacher in 1933. She subsequently became head of a nursery school. During World War II, she was amongst the founders of a women's resistance group in Toulouse affiliated with the National Front. She became a member of the French Communist Party (PCF) in 1942 and assisted Jewish families on the run.

After the war Rumeau was a PCF candidate in Haute-Garonne department in the October 1945 National Assembly elections, and was elected to parliament, becoming one of the first group of women in the National Assembly. Although she lost her seat in the June 1946 elections, she returned to the National Assembly after the November 1946 elections. She lost her seat again in 1951, but was elected back to parliament in 1956. She lost her seat for the final time in the 1958 elections. She subsequently ran unsuccessfully for the Senate in 1959 and 1962.

Rumeau later served on Toulouse municipal council from 1965 to 1971. She died in the city in 1985.
