= Socialist group in the Senate =

French parliamentary group

Socialist group in the Senate Groupe socialiste au Sénat
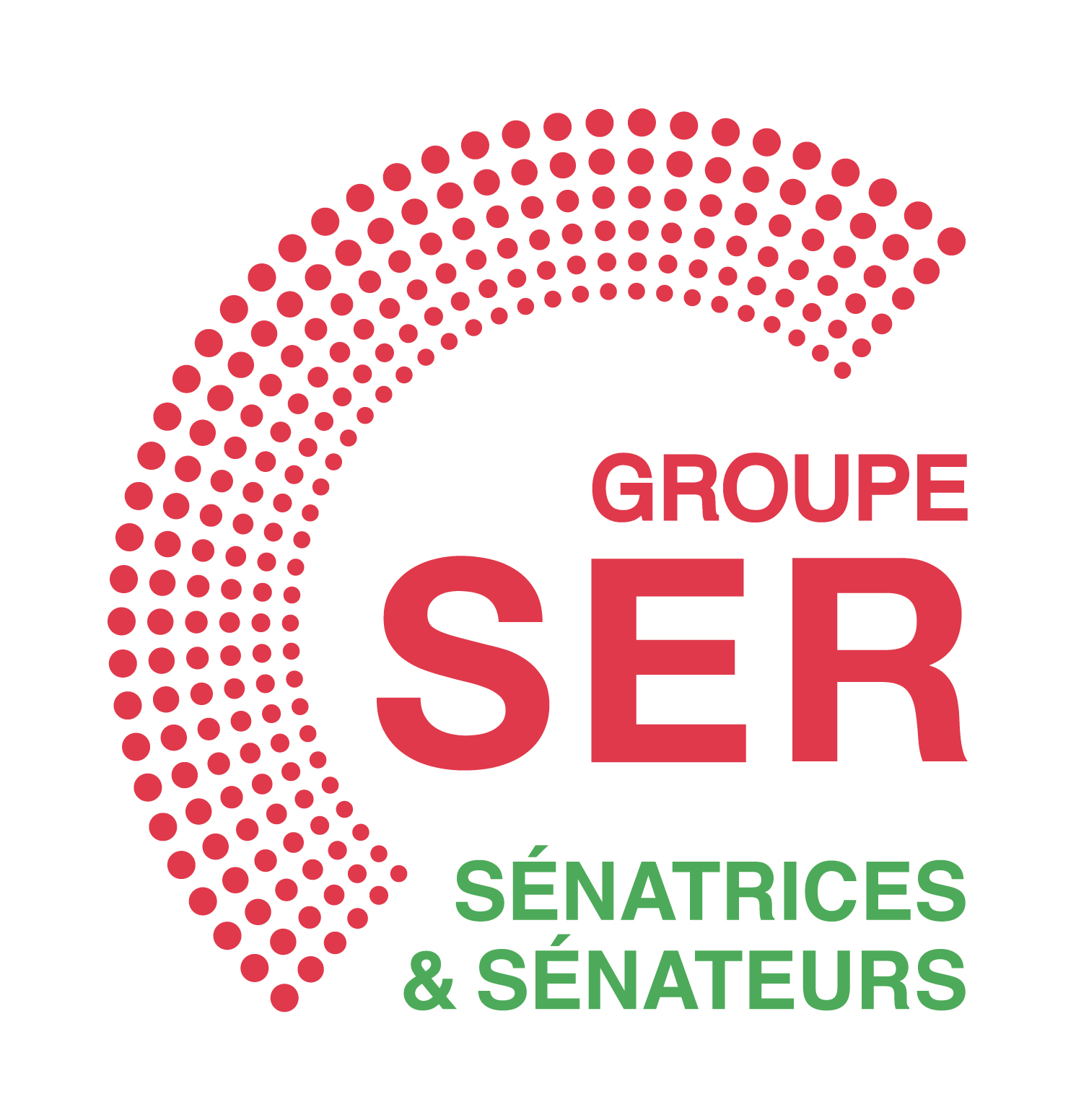
- Chamber: Senate
- Previous name(s): Socialist group (1959–2011); Groupe socialiste Socialist group, associated and attached Europe Ecology The Greens group (2011–12); Groupe socialiste, apparentés et groupe Europe Écologie Les Verts rattaché Socialist and associated group (2012–15); Groupe socialiste et apparentés
- Member parties: PS; PP; DVG
- President: Patrick Kanner
- Constituency: Nord
- Representation: 62 / 348
- Ideology: Social democracy
- Website: www.senateurs-socialistes.fr

The Socialist group in the Senate (French: Groupe socialiste au Sénat, SOC), currently the Socialist, Ecologist and Republican group (Groupe socialiste, écologiste et républicain, SER), is a parliamentary group in the French Senate including representatives of the Socialist Party (PS).

== History ==
The first parliamentary group of socialists in the Senate of the Third Republic was formed following the 1927 senatorial elections with a total of 14 members, after the election of 2 socialists in the 1921 renewal and the 1924 renewal bringing the total to 6 senators. Before the formal constitution of a group in the Senate, the elected socialists sat with the Democratic, Radical, and Radical-Socialist Left group. Though initially disorganized, the senators of the group recognized themselves under the common label of "socialist". Camille Reboul presided over the group from its foundation, and was later succeeded in this position by André Morizet. Tensions within the group led to the dissent of seven "neo-socialists" in 1933, halving the size of the group; however, the impact of this split was ultimately limited as the SFIO was able to ensure the survival of the socialist group in the Senate. The group remained roughly the same in size through the end of the Third Republic, with 16 members after the renewals of both 1929 and 1932; it subsequently adopted the appellation of the SFIO in 1934, was reduced to 13 members after the 1935 renewal, and rebounded to 15 senators after the 1938 renewal.

During the Fourth Republic, a socialist group was formed in the Council of the Republic, with 64 seats following senatorial elections on 8 December 1946, and 62 seats following senatorial elections on 7 November 1948, doing better than its tripartite partners as a result of its good local implantation. The group subsequently maintained 56 seats following senatorial elections on 18 May 1952, 56 seats following senatorial elections on 19 June 1955, and 60 seats following senatorial elections on 8 June 1958.

Antoine Courrière was the first president of the socialist group in the Senate of the Fifth Republic, presiding until his death on 20 September 1974. Following senatorial elections two days later, Marcel Champeix was elected president of the group on 2 October. After his defeat on 28 September 1980, Champeix was replaced by André Méric, who was officially designated president of the group on 6 October; he led the group until 5 July 1988, resigning as a result of his appointment as a Secretary of State in the government, and was succeeded by Claude Estier, who was elected president of the group on the same day. After Estier decided not to represent himself in the 2004 renewal, he was succeeded by Jean-Pierre Bel, elected by the socialists in a four-way contest on 28 September.

Bel remained president of the group until 30 September 2011, after which he took office as president of the Senate on 1 October; the left, long a minority a Senate, took control of the high chamber for the first time in the history of the republic after the 2011 renewal, with the number of Europe Ecology – The Greens senators swinging from 4 to 10 and the continuation of the communist group. With Bel at the perch, François Rebsamen was elected president of the group on 1 October, and on 25 September, the group was reformed as the Socialist group, associated and attached Europe Ecology The Greens group (groupe socialiste, apparentés et groupe Europe Écologie Les Verts rattaché); after the formation of an independent ecologist group on 11 January 2012, the socialist faction was renamed to the socialist and associated group (groupe socialiste et apparentés). After Rebsamen was appointed to the government, he left his seat in the Senate on 14 April 2014, and was succeeded by Didier Guillaume the following day. The left's control of the Senate was ephemeral, with the chamber decisively returning to the control of the right after the 2014 renewal. Following the renaming of the UMP to as the Republicans, its associated group in the Senate was also renamed on 2 June, followed soon thereafter on 10 June by the renaming of the socialist group to the Socialist and Republican group (groupe socialiste et républicain). On 27 June 2017, 23 socialists left for the La République En Marche group on the day of its foundation. After the retirement of Guillaume from politics, Patrick Kanner was elected president of the group with 47 votes, against Laurence Rossignol with 25 votes, on 23 January 2018.

== List of presidents ==
Name	Term start	Term end	Notes
Antoine Courrière	26 April 1959	20 September 1974	
Marcel Champeix	2 October 1974	28 September 1980	
André Méric	6 October 1980	5 July 1988	
Claude Estier	5 July 1988	28 September 2004	
Jean-Pierre Bel	28 September 2004	30 September 2011	
François Rebsamen	1 October 2011	14 April 2014	
Didier Guillaume	15 April 2014	23 January 2018	
Patrick Kanner	23 January 2018	present	

== Historical membership ==
Year	Seats	Change	Series	Notes
1959	51 / 307	Steady	–	
1962	52 / 274	▲1	A	
1965	52 / 274	Steady	B	
1968	52 / 283	Steady	C	
1971	49 / 283	▼3	A	
1974	52 / 283	▲3	B	
1977	62 / 295	▲10	C	
1980	69 / 305	▲7	A	
1983	70 / 317	▲1	B	
1986	64 / 319	▼6	C	
1989	66 / 321	▲2	A	
1992	70 / 321	▲4	B	
1995	75 / 321	▲5	C	
1998	78 / 321	▲3	A	
2001	83 / 321	▲5	B	
2004	97 / 331	▲14	C	
2008	116 / 343	▲19	A	
2011	141 / 348	▲25	1	
2014	112 / 348	▼29	2	
2017	78 / 348	▼34	1	
2020	65 / 348	▼13	2	

== See also ==
- New Left group
