= 1959 French Senate election =

The first senatorial elections of the Fifth Republic were held in France on April 26, 1959.

== Context ==
The Senate was created by constitution of the Fifth Republic to replace Council of the Republic. This election depend largely of the results of 1959 municipal elections.

== Results ==
Group	Ideology	Seats	Percentage
Independent Republicans (RI)	Liberalism, Right-wing	70	22,6 %
Democratic Left (GD)	Radicalism, Right-wing, Left-wing	66	21,3%
Socialist (SOC)	Socialism, Left-wing	61	19,7%
Union for the New Republic (UNR)	Gaullism, Right-wing	37	12,0%
Popular Republican Movement (MRP)	Christian democracy, Right-wing	34	11,0%
Republican Centre of Rural and Social Action (CNIP)	Conservatism, Right-wing	20	6,5%
Communist (COM)	Communism, Left-wing	14	4,5%
Non-Registered (NI)	None	7	2,3%
Total:		309	100,0 %

=== Senate Presidency ===
On April 28, 1959, Gaston Monnerville a senator from Guyane was elected president of the Senate. Monnerville has been the highest-ranking black politician in French history, and if he was a candidate for reelection in 1968, he could have become the first black president of France the next year when President Pompidou died.

== List of senators elected by region ==
Senator	Group	District	Source
Alsace
Louis Jung	RP	Bas-Rhin	
Michel Kauffmann	RP	Bas-Rhin	
Michel Kistler	RP	Bas-Rhin	
Paul Wach	RP	Bas-Rhin	
Paul-Jacques Kalb	UNR	Haut-Rhin	
Eugène Ritzenthaler	UNR	Haut-Rhin	
Modeste Zussy	UNR	Haut-Rhin	
Aquitaine
Marcel Brégégère	SOC	Dordogne	
Charles Sinsout	GD	Dordogne	
Marc Pauzet	CNIP	Gironde	
Georges Portmann	RI	Gironde	
Max Monichon	CNIP	Gironde	
Raymond Brun	CNIP	Gironde	
Jean-Louis Fournier	SOC	Landes	
Gérard Minvielle	SOC	Landes	
Jacques Bordeneuve	GD	Lot-et-Garonne	
Étienne Restat	GD	Lot-et-Garonne	
Guy Petit	RI	Basses-Pyrénées	
Jean Errecart	RP	Basses-Pyrénées	
Jean-Louis Tinaud	RI	Basses-Pyrénées	
Auvergne
Fernand Auberger	SOC	Allier	
Georges Rougeron	SOC	Allier	
Hector Peschaud	CNIP	Cantal	
Paul Piales	CNIP	Cantal	
Robert Bouvard	RI	Haute-Loire	
Jean De Lachomette	CNIP	Haute-Loire	
Michel Champleboux	SOC	Puy-de-Dôme	
Francis Dassaud	SOC	Puy-de-Dôme	
Gabriel Montpied	SOC	Puy-de-Dôme	
Lower Normandy
Louis Andre	RI	Calvados	
Jacques Descours-Desacres	RI	Calvados	
Jean-Marie Louvel	RP	Calvados	
Henri Cornat	RI	Manche	
Léon Jozeau-Marigne	RI	Manche	
Michel Yver	RI	Manche	
Étienne Le Sassier-Boisauné	RI	Orne	
Paul Pelleray	RI	Orne	
Burgundy
Roger Duchet	RI	Côte-d'Or	
Étienne Viallanes	RI	Côte-d'Or	
François Mitterrand	GD	Nièvre	
Jacques Gadoin	GD	Nièvre	
Roger Lagrange	SOC	Saône-et-Loire	
Marcel Legros	RI	Saône-et-Loire	
Jules Pinsard	GD	Saône-et-Loire	
Philippe de Raincourt (Note: dies two months later and was replaced by Paul Guillaumot)	RI	Yonne	
André Plait	RI	Yonne	
Brittany
André Cornu	GD	Côtes du Nord	
Jean de Bagneux	RI	Côtes du Nord	
Bernard Lemarié	RP	Côtes du Nord	
Jean Fichoux	RI	Finistère	
Yves Hamon	RP	Finistère	
André Monteil	RP	Finistère	
André Colin	RP	Finistère	
Roger du Halgouët	UNR	Ille-et-Vilaine	
Yves Estève	UNR	Ille-et-Vilaine	
Jean Noury	RP	Ille-et-Vilaine	
Marcel Lambert	RI	Morbihan	
Victor Golvan	UNR	Morbihan	
Joseph Yvon	RP	Morbihan	
Centre
Champagne-Ardenne
Corsica
Jean-Paul de Rocca-Serra	GD	Corsica	
Jacques Faggianelli	GD	Corsica	
Franche-Comté
Marcel Boulangé	SOC	Territoire de Belfort	
Jacques Henriet	RI	Doubs	
Marcel Prélot	UNR	Doubs	
Edgar Faure	GD	Jura	
Charles Laurent-Thouverey	GD	Jura	
Henri Pretre	RI	Haute-Saône	
André Maroselli	GD	Haute-Saône	
