= Gontard =

Gontard is a French surname created from the Germanic given name Gunthard. Notable people with the surname include:

- Carl von Gontard (1731–1791), German architect
- Guillaume Gontard (born 1971), French politician
- Susette Gontard (1769–1802), German writer
