= La République En Marche group =

La République En Marche group may refer to:

- La République En Marche group (National Assembly), the French National Assembly parliamentary group
- La République En Marche group (Senate), the French Senate parliamentary group
