= Hervé Marseille =

French politician (born 1954)

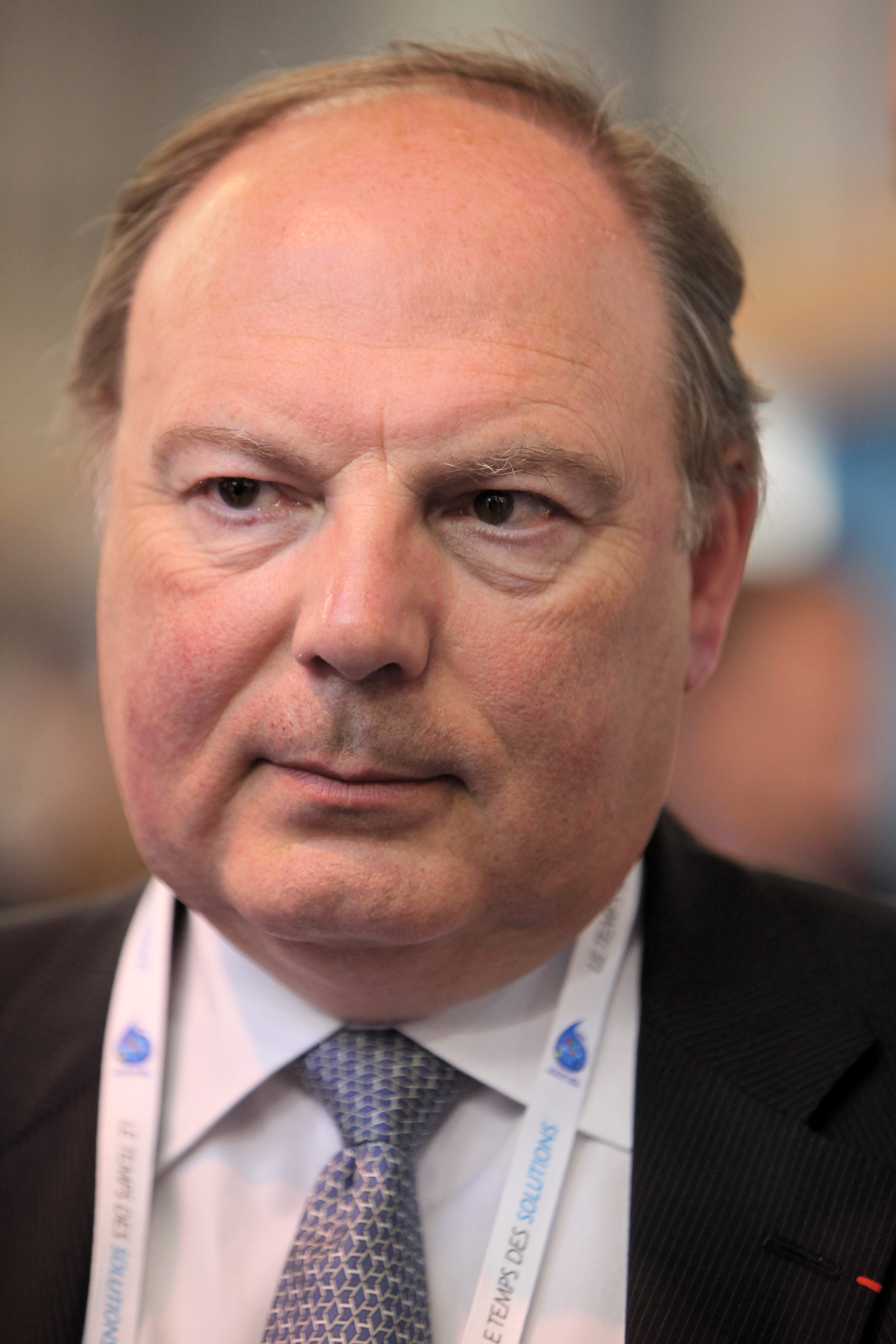
- Marseille in 2012

President of the Union of Democrats and Independents
- Incumbent
- Assumed office 10 December 2022
- Preceded by: Jean-Christophe Lagarde

President of the Centrist Union group in the Senate
- Incumbent
- Assumed office 1 October 2017
- Preceded by: François Zocchetto

Senator for Hauts-de-Seine
- Incumbent
- Assumed office 1 October 2011
- Preceded by: Denis Badré

Mayor of Meudon
- In office 9 March 1999 – 20 October 2017
- Preceded by: Henry Wolf
- Succeeded by: Denis Larghero

Personal details
- Born: 20 August 1954 (age 70); Abbeville, France
- Political party: Union for French Democracy; The Centrists; Union of Democrats and Independents

Hervé Marseille (French pronunciation: [ɛʁve maʁsɛj]; born 20 August 1954) is a French politician who has presided over the Centrist Union group in the Senate since 2017 and over the Union of Democrats and Independents party since 2022. He has represented the Hauts-de-Seine department in the Senate since 2011.

A former Mayor of Meudon (1999–2017), Marseille is widely seen as one of the most influential figures in the current Senate. He started his political career in 1989 as a municipal councillor of Meudon. In 2005, he was appointed a Councillor of State in extraordinary service. He served as a member of the Regional Council of Île-de-France (1992–2004) and of the Departmental Council of Hauts-de-Seine (2004–2012, elected in the canton of Meudon).
