= Guillaume Gontard =

French politician (born 1971)

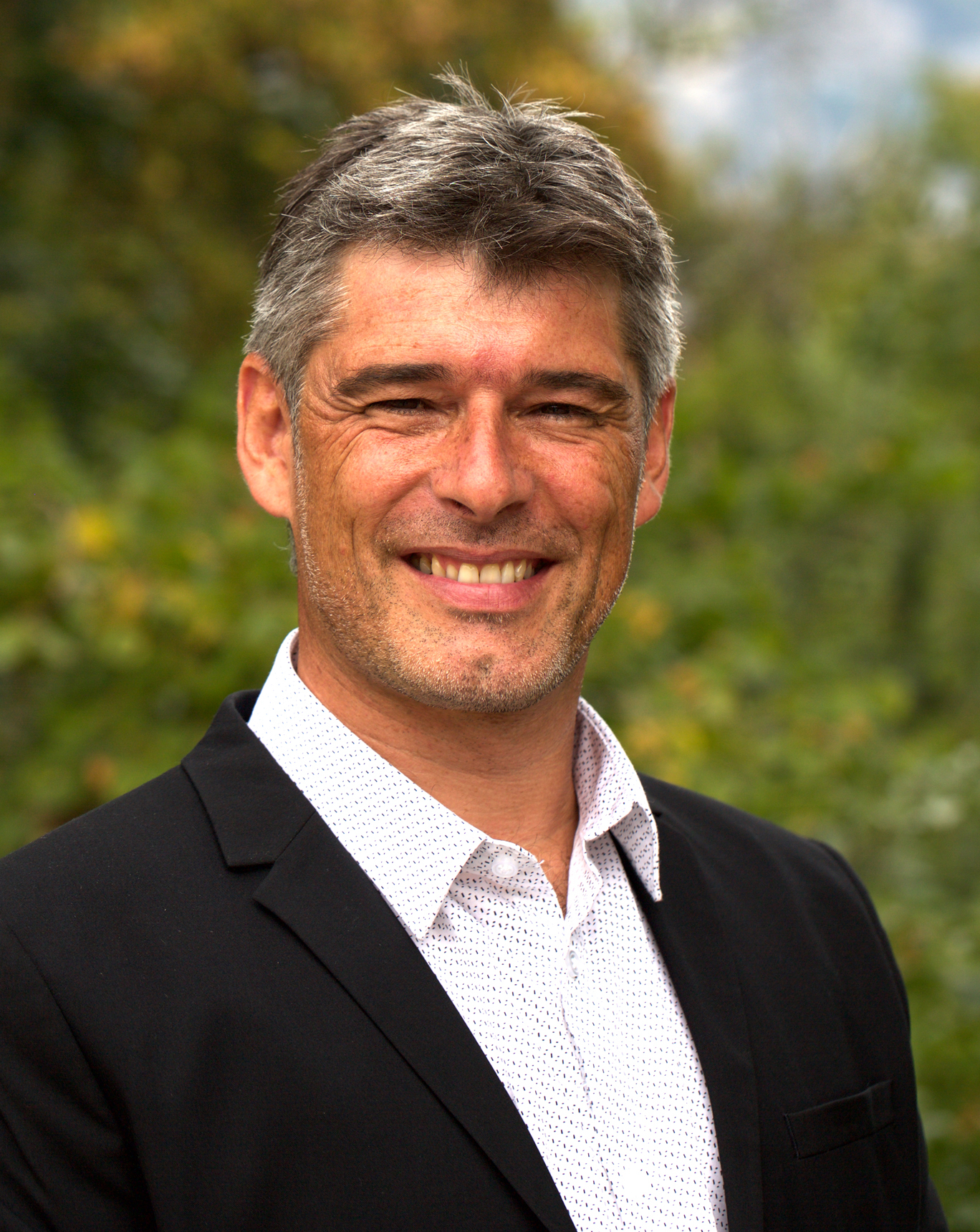
- Gontard in 2018

Member of the French Senate for Isère
- Incumbent
- Assumed office 1 October 2017

Personal details
- Born: 11 March 1971 (age 55) Tours, France
- Party: Miscellaneous left
- Education: Lycée Stendhal
- Alma mater: ENSAG

Guillaume Gontard (born 11 March 1971) is a French politician who is president of the Ecologist group in the French Senate.

== Political career ==
Guillaume Gontard was born on 11 March 1971 in Tours (Indre-et-Loire). His family moved to the village of Percy (Isère) in the Trièves (country of his ancestors) when he was 4 years old. He began his schooling in a single class at the municipal school of Le Monestier-du-Percy, he continued his studies at the college of Mens then at the Lycée Stendhal in Grenoble. Passionate about regional planning, he joined the Grenoble School of Architecture (ENSAG) and graduated in 1997.

He is co-manager of SARL B.A BA Architecture Aménagement.

Gontard served as mayor of Percy, Isère from 2008 to 2017. He was elected senator in Isère in the 2017 French Senate election.

On 5 October 2017, after joining the CRCE group, he was appointed vice-president of the Committee on Sustainable Development, Infrastructure, Equipment, and Regional Planning. In 2019, he was the rapporteur for the Senate's joint information mission on the free public transportation.

Following the senatorial renewal of September 2020 and three years after the disappearance of the Senate's green group, he was elected president of the newly recreated group, titled the Ecologist, Solidarity, and Territories (EST) group, defeating Esther Benbassa. On 1 October, as a candidate for the presidency of the Senate against Gérard Larcher, he obtained 13 votes, one more than the number of members of the EST group.

In 2022, he authored a resolution proposal on the economic development of the hemp industry in France, adopted by the Senate.

In 2023, he served as rapporteur for the inquiry commission on the effectiveness of public policies regarding energy renovation.

== Personal life ==
He is married and the father of three children.
