= Philippe Adnot =

French politician

Member of the French Senate for Aube
- Incumbent
- Assumed office 2 October 1989

President, Conseil départemental de l'Aube
- In office 2 April 1990 – 10 May 2017

Councillor, Conseil départemental de l'Aube
- In office 24 March 1982 – 10 May 2017

Personal details
- Born: 25 August 1945 (age 80) Rhèges, Aube
- Party: Independent / Mouvement libéral et modéré
- Occupation: Farmer

Philippe Adnot (born 25 August 1945 in Rhèges, Aube) is a member of the Senate of France. A farmer by profession, he first entered the Senate, where he sits as an independent, in October 1989. Elected as a representative of the Aube department, he was until 10 May 2017 also president of its Conseil départemental, to which he was first elected in 1982 to represent the former canton of Méry-sur-Seine; subsequently (from April 2015) he represented the newly created canton of Creney-près-Troyes.

In 1998 and 2008, he was re-elected to the Senate in the first round, avoiding the need for a run-off vote.

Having contributed to the creation of the University of Technology of Troyes, in 1998 he was made the first Vice President of the University board, of which he is currently the President. He is a member of the Senate's committee on the laws relating to the freedoms and responsibilities of Universities.

As of 2009, he serves as the Delegate from the Administrative Meeting for Senators not on the list of another Group.

He is decorated as a Chevalier of the Ordre National de Mérite Agricole.

== Bibliography ==
- Page on the French Senate website
