= 1971 French Senate election =

French election

The fifth senatorial elections of the Fifth Republic were held in France on September 26, 1971.

== Context ==
This election has depended largely of the results of 1971 municipal elections.

== Results ==
Group	Ideology	Seats	+/−	Percentage
Independent Republicans (RI)	Liberalism, Right-wing	59	▲5	20,8 %
Socialist (SOC)	Socialism, Left-wing	49	▼3	17,3%
Centrist Union of Progressive Democrats (UCDP)	Christian democracy, Right-wing	46	▼1	16,3%
Union of Democrats for the Republic (UDR)	Gaullism, Right-wing	38	▲2	13,4%
Democratic Left (GD)	Radicalism, Right-wing, Left-wing	38	▼5	13,4%
Non-Registered (NI)	None	19	▲5	6,7%
Communist (COM)	Communism, Left-wing	18	0	6,4%
Independent Republicans of Social Action (RIAS)	Conservatism, Right-wing	16	▼3	5,7%
Total:		283	0	100,0 %

=== Senate Presidency ===
On October 2, 1971, Alain Poher was re-elected president of the Senate.
