= 2001 French Senate election =

Following the end of the nine-year terms of Series C senators, a senatorial election was held on 26 September 2001 in order to renew one-third of the members of the Senate.102 of the 322 seats were up for election.

== Results ==
		Members	%
		Number	Percent
Communist, Republican, Citizen and Ecologist group	CRC	23	7.2
Socialist and Republican group	SOC	83	25.9
European Democratic and Social Rally group	RDSE	19	5.9
Centrist Union group	UC	53	16.6
Independent Republicans group	RI	40	12.5
The Republicans group	RPR	96	30.0
Non-Attached group	NI	6	1.9
Vacant(s)		2	
Total		322	
