= Independent Republicans Group (French Senate) =

The Independent Republicans Group (French: Groupe des Républicains et Indépendants, RI) was a liberal parliamentary group in the French Senate.

== History of the group under the Fifth Republic ==
Years	Workforce	+/−	%	Rank	Group status
2001	40	▼9			Majority Group
1998	49	▲3			Majority Group
1995	46	▼1			Majority Group
1992	47	▼5			Majority Group
1989	52	▼2			Majority Group
1986	54	▲4			Majority Group
1983	50	▼2			Majority Group
1980	52	0			Majority Group
1977	52	▲6			Majority Group
1974	58	▼1			Majority Group
1971	59	▲5			Majority Group
1968	54	▼6			Majority Group
1965	60	▼5			Majority Group
1962	65	▼5			Majority Group
1959	70			1st	Majority Group
