= Communist, Republican, Citizen and Ecologist group =

Parliamentary group in France

Communist, Republican, Citizen and Ecologist – Kanaky group Groupe communiste, républicain, citoyen et écologiste – Kanaky
- Chamber: Senate
- Previous name(s): Communist group (1959–1995); Groupe communiste Communist, Republican, Citizen and Senators of the Left Party group (2008–2011); Groupe communiste, républicain, citoyen et des sénateurs du Parti de gauche Communist, Republican, and Citizen group (2011–2017); Groupe communiste, républicain, et citoyen
- Member parties: PCF
- President: Cécile Cukierman
- Constituency: Seine-Saint-Denis
- Representation: 18 / 348
- Ideology: Communism
- Website: https://senateurscrce.fr/

The Communist, Republican, Citizen and Ecologist – Kanaky group (French: groupe communiste, républicain, citoyen et ecologiste – Kanaky, CRCE-K) is a parliamentary group in the French Senate, the indirectly elected upper house of the French Parliament. Unlike most other parliamentary groups in the Senate, it counts mostly of only the Senators of one party, the French Communist Party, among its members.

== History ==
The first and only parliamentary group of communists in the Senate of the Third Republic was formed following the 1938 senatorial elections, with two members. A communist group existed through the duration of the Fourth Republic in the Council of the Republic, with 74 seats following senatorial elections on 8 December 1946, 17 seats following senatorial elections on 7 November 1948, 16 seats following senatorial elections on 18 May 1952, 14 seats following senatorial elections on 19 June 1955, and 16 seats following senatorial elections on 8 June 1958.

In the Fifth Republic, Jacques Duclos served as the first leader of the communist group (groupe communiste) in the Senate. After the death of Duclos on 25 April 1975, Marie-Thérèse Goutmann took over the presidency of the group on 20 May 1975, becoming the first woman to preside over a parliamentary group. She subsequently sought to become a deputy in the National Assembly in the 1978 legislative elections; due to irregularities which resulted in the invalidation of the original result by the Constitutional Council, however, a by-election was held on 16 and 23 July which ultimately resulted in her election to the assembly and departure from the Senate; as such, though Marcel Rosette became the new president of the group on 6 April, Goutmann was obligated to continue to sit in the Senate until the Constitutional Council later confirmed her election to the National Assembly. She remained president of the group for only a year, and was replaced by Hélène Luc on 19 December 1979. The communist group expanded to include 24 members after the 1983 renewal, the highest number ever attained by the communist group. On 28 September, Hélène Luc announced that the group would be renamed to the Communist, Republican and Citizen group (groupe communiste, républicain et citoyen), abbreviated CRC, presenting it as an "opening to the people of progress"; specifically, it allowed Paul Loridant, member of the Movement of Citizens of Jean-Pierre Chevènement, to join the group.

Luc's stint as president of the group ended on 3 April 2001; she was succeeded by Nicole Borvo. On 26 November 2008, Jean-Luc Mélenchon and François Autain, who left the Socialist Party (PS) to found the Left Party, joined the group, which was then renamed to the Communist, Republican, Citizen and Senators of the Left Party group (groupe communiste, républicain, citoyen et des sénateurs du Parti de gauche), abbreviated CRC–SPG. However, after Jean-Luc Mélenchon was elected to the European Parliament after the 2009 elections, he vacated his seat in the Senate on 7 January 2010, and after Autain lost his seat in the Senate in the renewal of seats during the senatorial elections on 25 September 2011, the group reverted to its original name. On 19 September 2012, Nicole Borvo Cohen-Seat resigned from the Senate, and was succeeded by Eliane Assassi, who was elected president of the CRC group the same day. The group was renamed to the Communist, Republican, Citizen and Ecologist group (groupe communiste, républicain, citoyen et ecologiste) after the 2017 renewal, when it was joined by the ecologist senators Esther Benbassa, Guillaume Gontard, and Pierre-Yves Collombat.

== List of presidents ==
Name	Term start	Term end	Notes
Jacques Duclos	26 April 1959	25 April 1975	
Marie-Thérèse Goutmann	20 May 1975	6 April 1978	
Marcel Rosette	6 April 1978	19 December 1979	
Hélène Luc	19 December 1979	3 April 2001	
Nicole Borvo Cohen-Seat	4 April 2001	19 September 2012	
Éliane Assassi	19 September 2012	1 October 2023	
Cécile Cukierman	1 October 2023	present	

== Historical membership ==
Year	Seats	Change	Series	Notes
1959	14 / 307	Steady	–	
1962	14 / 274	Steady	A	
1965	14 / 274	Steady	B	
1968	18 / 283	▲4	C	
1971	18 / 283	Steady	A	
1974	20 / 283	▲2	B	
1977	23 / 295	▲3	C	
1980	23 / 305	Steady	A	
1983	24 / 317	▲1	B	
1986	15 / 319	▼9	C	
1989	16 / 321	▲1	A	
1992	15 / 321	▼1	B	
1995	15 / 321	Steady	C	
1998	16 / 321	▲1	A	
2001	23 / 321	▲7	B	
2004	23 / 331	Steady	C	
2008	23 / 343	Steady	A	
2011	21 / 348	▼2	1	
2014	18 / 348	▼3	2	
2017	15 / 348	▼3	1	
2020	15 / 348	Steady	2	
2023	17 / 348	▲2	1	

== See also ==
- Democratic and Republican Left group
