= Nicole Borvo =

French politician (born 1945)

Member of the French Senate for Paris
- In office 24 September 1995 – 19 September 2012
- Succeeded by: Pierre Laurent

President of the Communist group in the Senate
- In office 1 October 2001 – 19 September 2012
- Preceded by: Hélène Luc
- Succeeded by: Éliane Assassi

Personal details
- Born: 8 December 1945 (age 80) Marseille, France
- Party: PCF
- Education: Sciences Po

Nicole Borvo (born 8 December 1945) is a member of the Senate of France, representing Paris. She is a member of the Communist, Republican, and Citizen Group.
