= 2011 French Senate election =

- 25 September 2011

165 of 348 seats in the Senate 175 seats needed for a majority
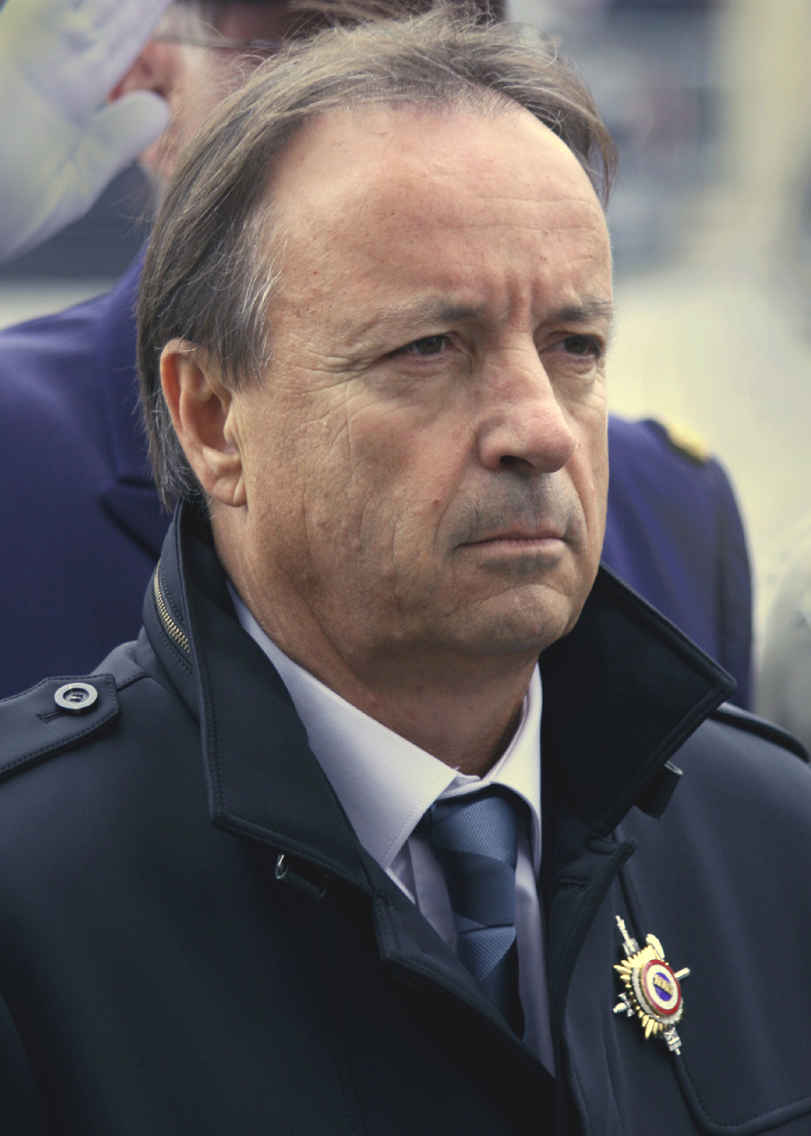

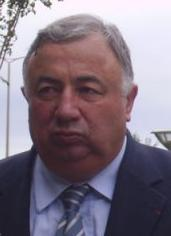

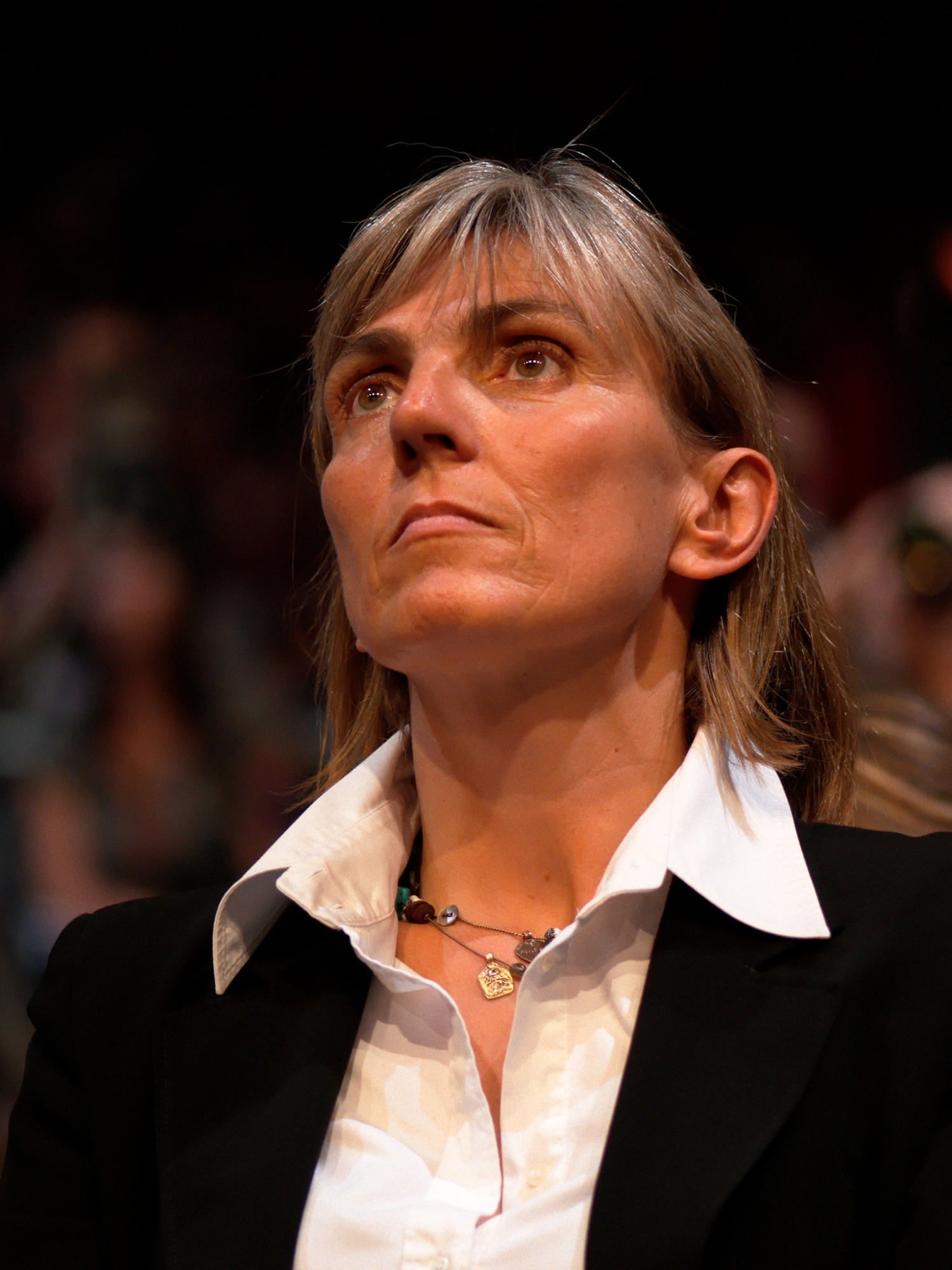
	Majority party	Minority party	Third party
Leader	Jean-Pierre Bel	Gérard Larcher	Valérie Létard
Party	PS	UMP	NM
Alliance	Union of the Left	Presidential Majority	ARES
Leader since		1 October 2008	1 October 2008
Leader's seat	Ariège	Yvelines	Nord
Seats before	152	161	30
Seats won	177	140	31
Seat change	▲25	▼21	▲1
President of the Senate before election
Gérard Larcher
UMP
President-elect of the Senate
Jean-Pierre Bel
PS

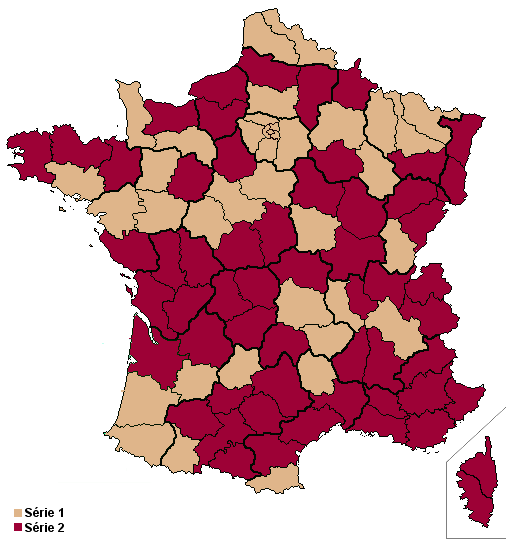
Brown areas show departments in contention in the election (Series 1).

A Senate election was held for 165 of the 348 seats in the Senate of France on 25 September 2011. Senate members were primarily elected by municipal officials, and the number of senators was increased from 343 to 348, due to the growth of France's population since the previous election was held in 2008. The Socialist Party and other left-of-center parties gained a majority of seats in the upper house for the first time in the Fifth Republic.

== Results ==
Political groups		2004		2008		2011	
Union for a Popular Movement (Union pour un mouvement populaire)	UMP	155	▼7	151	▼4	132	▼19
Centrist Union (Union centriste)	UC	33	▼20	29	▼4	31	▲2
Presidential Majority		188	▼27	180	▼8	163	▼17
Socialist (Socialiste)	SOC	97	▲14	116	▲19	130	▲14
Communist, Republican and Citizen (Communiste, Républicain et Citoyen)	CRC	23	0	23	0	21	▼2
European Democratic and Social Rally (Rassemblement démocratique et social européen)	RDSE	16	▼3	17	▲1	17	0
Europe Écologie–The Greens (Europe Écologie – Les Verts)	EELV					10	▲10
Union of the Left		118	▲14	139	▲19	178	▲22
Non-Registered (Non-Inscrits)	NI	7	▲1	7	▲1	7	0
Total		331	▲13	343	▲12	348	▲5
Source: Public Senat

=== Swing to the left ===
Prior to the 2011 election, the French Senate had been under the majority control of right or centre-right parties since the start of the Fifth Republic. Following left-wing gains in the senatorial elections of 2004 and 2008, the 2011 elections saw the Senate coming under the control of left-wing parties such as the Socialist Party, who gained around 24 new seats.

=== Senate Presidency ===
After the election, the incumbent President of the Senate, Gérard Larcher, stated his intention to run for re-election; he believed that he could win despite the left-wing majority, with the aid of alliances with independents, centrists, and some leftists.

Jean-Pierre Bel, President of the Socialist Group, was elected as President of the Senate on 1 October 2011, replacing Larcher. He received 179 votes against 134 votes for Larcher; a centrist, Valerie Letard, received 29 votes.

== Interpretations and potential consequences ==
The election was seen in many circles as a referendum on the incumbent French president Nicolas Sarkozy, whose popularity had been in decline over the preceding months. François Hollande, a Socialist politician considered to be a leading contender for the 2012 Socialist presidential nomination, pointed out that the defeat meant the Sarkozy's incumbent Union for a Popular Movement party had lost seats in every election since he took office in 2007. UMP politicians described the election results as "a serious warning for [their] party".

Socialist control of the French Senate would prevent Sarkozy from passing a balanced budget constitutional amendment, which requires three-fifths of the vote from the combined French Parliament. It would also enable the Socialists to launch commissions of inquiry into, for instance, possible political corruption allegations.

The German news magazine Der Spiegel, looking at September 2011 polls and forward to the May 2012 presidential election, observed that "the Socialist Party – still licking its wounds after a sex scandal brought down their great hope Dominique Strauss-Kahn – would win ... if it were held today." It also opined that Sarkozy's "foreign policy actionism" in Libya – including a 15 September visit to Tripoli with David Cameron – and "proposals for a quick resolution to the Middle East conflict at the United Nations" just prior to the election were not "able to perceptively increase his popularity".
