= Éliane Assassi =

French politician (born 1958)

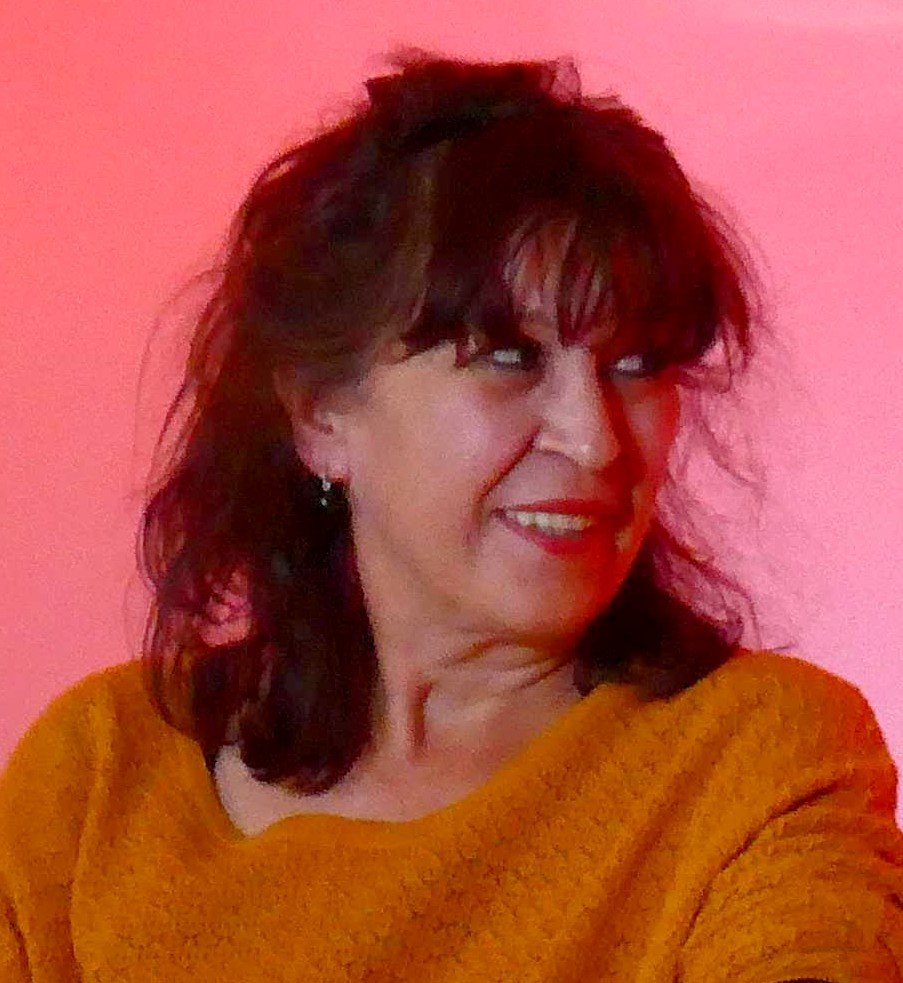
- Éliane Assassi in 2016

Member of the French Senate for Seine-Saint-Denis
- Incumbent
- Assumed office 1 October 2004

President of the Communist group in the French Senate
- Incumbent
- Assumed office 19 September 2012
- Preceded by: Nicole Borvo Cohen-Seat

Personal details
- Born: 2 October 1958 (age 68) Paris, France
- Party: PCF
- Profession: Communications director

Éliane Assassi (born 2 October 1958) is a French politician and a member of the Senate of France, representing the Seine-Saint-Denis department. She is a member of the Communist, Republican, Citizen and Ecologist group.

== Biography ==
Éliane Assassi was born into a Franco-Algerian family. She lived in Gagny in Seine-Saint-Denis during her childhood. Her father, a laborer, died of cancer, likely linked to repeated exposure to asbestos in the workplace, when she was six years old. Her younger brother died in an accident four years later.

She started working at a very young age with her mother, doing housekeeping, and at one point considered becoming a police commissioner. She worked in a tire retreading factory. She joined the French Communist Party at the age of 14.

She is a Communication director by profession.

== See also ==
- Women in the French Senate
