= Gisèle Printz =

French politician (1933–2025)

Gisèle Printz (27 June 1933 – 8 October 2025) was a French politician who was a member of the Senate, representing the Moselle department from 1996 to 2014. She was a member of the Socialist Party.

Printz died on 8 October 2025, at the age of 92.

== Sources ==
- Page on the Senate website (in French)
