= Penn-ar-Bed (company) =

French shipping company

BreizhGo Penn Ar Bed
- Founded: 1992
- Headquarters: Brest, France
- Area served: Iroise Sea
- Services: Passenger transportation Freight transportation
- Parent: Keolis
- Website: pennarbed.breizhgo.bzh

BreizhGo Penn Ar Bed is a French shipping company providing a ferry service between Finistère and the islands of Ushant, Molène and Sein every day of the year, under a public service contract to the Conseil général du Finistère. It is named after Penn Ar Bed, the Breton name for Finistère. Its livery is blue and white.

== Routes ==
The company operates the following routes:

- Brest - Le Conquet - Molène - Ushant
- Audierne - Ile de Sein
- Brest - Camaret-sur-Mer - Molène - Ushant (Seasonal)
- Brest - Camaret-sur-Mer - Ile de Sein (Seasonal)

== Fleet ==
Penn Ar Bed operates a fleet of seven vessels.

| Yard No | Image | Year Built | Passengers | Notes |
| André Colin | | 1996 | 195 | |
| Enez Eussa III | | 1991 | 302 | |
| Enez Sun III | | 1991 | 250 | |
| Fromveur | | 1977 | 365 | To be withdrawn in 2011 |
| Fromveur II | | 2011 | 365 | |
| Molenez | | 2000 | 0 | |
| Docteur Tricard | | 1997 | 46 | |
