= 1965 French Senate election =

Senatorial elections in France

The third senatorial elections of the Fifth Republic were held in France on September 26, 1965.

== Context ==
This election has depended largely of the results of 1965 municipal elections.

== Results ==
Group	Ideology	Seats	+/−	Percentage
Independent Republicans (RI)	Liberalism, Right-wing	60	▼5	21,9 %
Socialist (SOC)	Socialism, Left-wing	52	0	19,0%
Democratic Left (GD)	Radicalism, Right-wing, Left-wing	50	0	18,2%
Popular Republicans and Democratic Centre (RPCD)	Christian democracy, Right-wing	38	▲3	13,9%
Union for the New Republic (UNR)	Gaullism, Right-wing	30	▼2	10,9%
Republican Centre of Rural and Social Action (CNIP)	Conservatism, Right-wing	19	▼1	6,9%
Communist (COM)	Communism, Left-wing	14	0	5,1%
Non-Registered (NI)	None	11	▲5	4,0%
Total:		274	0	100,0 %

=== Senate Presidency ===
On October 2, 1965, Gaston Monnerville was re-elected president of the Senate.
