= Administrative meeting of senators not appearing on the list of any group =

Group of unaffiliated senators in the French Senate

Administrative meeting of senators not appearing on the list of any group Réunion administrative des sénateurs ne figurant sur la liste d'aucun groupe
- Chamber: Senate
- Previous name(s): Group of non-registered members (1968–71); Groupe des non-inscrits Group of the union of senators not registered with a political group (1971–76); Groupe de l'Union des sénateurs non inscrits à un groupe politique
- Member parties: DVD; LFI
- President: Paul Mougenot (delegate)
- Representation: 2 / 348
- Website: http://www.rasnag-senat.fr/

The administrative meeting of senators not appearing on the list of any group (French: réunion administrative des sénateurs ne figurant sur la liste d'aucun groupe, abbreviated RASNAG) is the term used since 1976 to refer to the grouping of members of the Senate of France who are not registered (non inscrits) as belonging to any political group. It is not itself a formal parliamentary group, although a group of non-registered members existed from 1968 to 1976, first under the name of the group of non-registered members (groupe des non-inscrits) from 3 October 1968, and later the group of the union of senators not registered with a political group (groupe de l'Union des sénateurs non inscrits à un groupe politique) from 30 June 1971 to 1976, both of which elected their own presidents. Non-inscrits have not always formed a group; in the records of the Journal officiel, such members were listed under the title of senators not registered with a political group (sénateurs non inscrits à un groupe politique) from 1959 to 1960 and 1964 to 1967, as well as under the appellation of senators neither appearing on a list nor associated with a group list (sénateurs ne figurant ni sur une liste ni à la suite d'une liste de groupe) from 1961 to 1963, 1968 to 1969, and in 1973.

Historically, non-inscrits have tended to form a parliamentary group when possible; however, this has often not been feasible because they were too few in number to do so, the current threshold being 10 senators. The administrative meeting therefore elects a delegate who represents it in a manner analogous to that of presidents in other political groups and has certain rights of participation in the allocation of seats in committees and the apportionment between parliamentary groups of membership of the Bureau of the Senate. The group is chaired by Paul Mougenot since 5 October 2026.

== Current composition ==
Name	Party	Constituency	Notes
Gabriel Amard	LFI	Rhône	
Paul Mougenot	DVD	Aisne	

== Historical membership ==
Year	Seats	Change	Series	Notes
1959	6 / 307	Steady	–	
1962	6 / 274	Steady	A	
1965	11 / 274	▲5	B	
1968	14 / 283	▲3	C	
1971	19 / 283	▲5	A	
1974	18 / 283	▼1	B	
1977	9 / 295	▼9	C	
1980	14 / 305	▲5	A	
1983	5 / 317	▼9	B	
1986	4 / 319	▼1	C	
1989	5 / 321	▲1	A	
1992	10 / 321	▲5	B	
1995	8 / 321	▼2	C	
1998	6 / 321	▼2	A	
2001	6 / 321	Steady	B	
2004	7 / 331	▲1	C	
2008	7 / 343	Steady	A	
2011	7 / 348	Steady	1	
2014	9 / 348	▲2	2	
2017	5 / 348	▼4	1	
2020	3 / 348	▼2	2	
