= 1968 French Senate election =

The fourth senatorial elections of the Fifth Republic were held in France on September 22, 1968.

== Context ==
This election has depended largely of the results of 1965 municipal elections.

== Results ==
Group	Ideology	Seats	+/−	Percentage
Independent Republicans (RI)	Liberalism, Right-wing	54	▼6	19,1 %
Socialist (SOC)	Socialism, Left-wing	52	0	18,4%
Centrist Union of Progressive Democrats (UCDP)	Christian democracy, Right-wing	47	▲9	16,6%
Democratic Left (GD)	Radicalism, Right-wing, Left-wing	43	▼7	15,2%
Union of Democrats for the Republic (UDR)	Gaullism, Right-wing	36	▲6	12,7%
Republican Centre of Rural and Social Action (CNIP)	Conservatism, Right-wing	19	0	6,7%
Communist (COM)	Communism, Left-wing	18	▲4	6,4%
Non-Registered (NI)	None	14	▲3	4,9%
Total:		283	▲9	100,0 %

=== Senate Presidency ===
On October 3, 1968, Alain Poher was elected president of the Senate.
