= 1962 French Senate election =

The second senatorial elections of the Fifth Republic were held in France on September 23, 1962.

== Context ==
This election has depended largely of the results of 1959 municipal elections.

== Results ==
Group	Ideology	Seats	+/−	Percentage
Independent Republicans (RI)	Liberalism, Right-wing	65	▼5	23,7 %
Socialist (SOC)	Socialism, Left-wing	52	▼9	19,0%
Democratic Left (GD)	Radicalism, Right-wing, Left-wing	50	▼16	18,2%
Popular Republicans (RP)	Christian democracy, Right-wing	35	▲1	12,8%
Union for the New Republic (UNR)	Gaullism, Right-wing	32	▼5	11,7%
Republican Centre of Rural and Social Action (CNIP)	Conservatism, Right-wing	20	0	7,3%
Communist (COM)	Communism, Left-wing	14	0	5,1%
Non-Registered (NI)	None	6	▼1	2,2%
Total:		274	▼35	100,0 %

=== Senate Presidency ===
On October 2, 1962, Gaston Monnerville was re-elected president of the Senate.
