= Union for the New Republic =

Political party in France (1958–1967)

Union for the New Republic Union pour la nouvelle république
- The Cross of Lorraine was the official symbol of the UNR.
- President: Charles de Gaulle
- General Secretary: Robert Poujade (last)
- Founder: Charles de Gaulle
- Founded: 1 October 1958
- Dissolved: 26 November 1967
- Preceded by: National Centre of Social Republicans
- Succeeded by: Union for the Defense of the Republic
- Headquarters: Paris
- Newspaper: La Lettre de la nation Magazine
- Trade union: Union démocratique du travail
- Ideology: Gaullism; Dirigisme; Social conservatism; Conservatism
- Political position: Right-wing
- European Parliament group: Liberal and Allies Group (1958–1965); European Democratic Union (1965–1967)
- Colours: Blue and red

The Union for the New Republic (French: L'Union pour la nouvelle République, pronounced [lynjɔ̃ puʁ la nuvɛl ʁepyblik], UNR) was a Gaullist political party in France, formed in support of Charles de Gaulle in the 1958 elections.

== History ==
The UNR won 189 of 466 seats in the November 1958 elections.

In 1962, the UNR grouped with the Gaullist Democratic Union of Labour (French: Union démocratique du travail, UDT) to form the UNR-UDT. They won 233 seats out of 482, slightly less than an absolute majority. 35 Independent Republicans boosted their support.

In 1967, UNR candidates ran under the title Union of Democrats for the Fifth Republic (Union des démocrates pour la V^{e} République, UD-V^{e}), winning 200 out of 486 seats.

The UNR was renamed Union for the Defense of the Republic in 1967, and later Union of Democrats for the Republic in 1971.

== Secretaries General of the UNR ==
- Roger Frey, 1958–1959
- Albin Chalandon, 1959
- Jacques Richard, 1959–1961
- Roger Dusseaulx, 1961–1962
- Louis Terrenoire, 1962
- Jacques Baumel, 1962–1967
- Robert Poujade, 1967–1969

== UNR in the Senate ==
Under the Fifth Republic, 39 senators were affiliated to the UNR Group and 11 of them were Muslims or with Muslim origins.

- First Senate election – 37 seats; 12.0%
- Second Senate election – 32 seats; 11.7%
- Third Senate election – 30 seats; 10.9%

Maurice Bayrou was the leader of the group in the Senate from October 1962 to October 1965.

== Election results ==
=== Presidential ===
President of the French Republic
Election	Candidate	First round		Second round		Result
Election	Candidate	Votes	%	Votes	%	Result
1958	Charles de Gaulle	62,394	78.51%	-	-	Won
1965	Charles de Gaulle	10,828,521	44.65%	13,083,699	55.20%	Won

=== National Assembly ===
National Assembly
Election year	Leader	First round		Second round		Seats	+/−	Rank (seats)
Election year	Leader	Votes	%	Votes	%	Seats	+/−	Rank (seats)
1958	Charles de Gaulle	3,603,958	17.6	4,769,052	26.4	189 / 576	–	1st
1962	Georges Pompidou	5,855,744	31.9	6,169,890	40.5	233 / 491	▲44	1st

== See also ==
- Gaullist Party
