= 1959 French municipal elections =

Municipal elections were held in France on 8 and 15 March 1959. After coming to power in 1958 under the 5th Republic, the 1959 locals were the first municipal elections under the new republic. After exceptional scores in 1958, the Gaullist UDR realized mediocre scores. The MRP, radicals, SFIO, and Communists held their positions.

== Sources ==
- History of French Local Elections
