= François Zocchetto =

French lawyer and politician

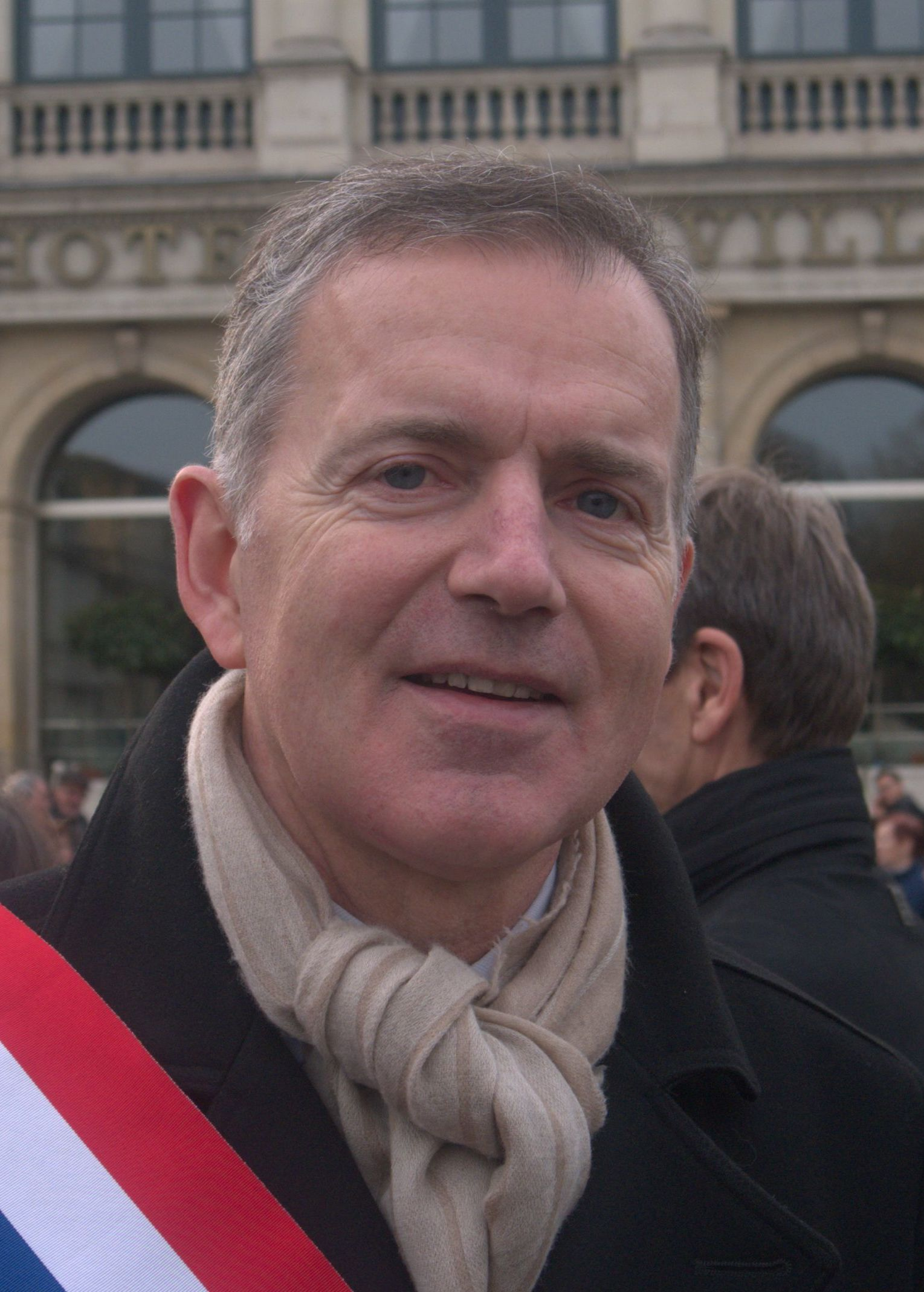

Mayor of Laval
- In office 2014–2020
- Preceded by: Jean-Christophe Boyer
- Succeeded by: Florian Bercault

Member of the French Senate for Mayenne
- In office 2001–2017

Personal details
- Born: 14 December 1958 (age 67) Laval, France
- Party: UDI
- Education: ESCP Europe; Sciences Po

François Zocchetto (born 14 December 1958) is a French lawyer and politician who served as a member of the Senate of France from 2001 until 2017, representing the Mayenne department. He is a member of the Centrist Alliance and caucuses with the Centrist Union. In 2019, he joined independent law firm De Gaulle Fleurance & Associés in Paris as a partner.

== Career in the private sector ==
A chartered accountant, Zocchetto began his private career with an audit/accounting and statutory auditor firm, and then founded in 1987 a law firm in business law for small and medium-sized enterprises (SMEs) located in Paris and Western France.

== Political career ==
In the 2012 French presidential election, Zocchetto supported François Bayrou before endorsing Nicolas Sarkozy in the election's second round.

In 2013, Jean-Louis Borloo of the Union of Democrats and Independents (UDI) included Zocchetto in his shadow cabinet; in this capacity, he served as opposition counterpart to Minister of Justice Christiane Taubira.

== Bibliography ==
- on the Senate website
