= Centrist Union of Democrats for Progress =

The Centrist Union of Democrats for Progress (French: Union centriste des démocrates de progrès, UCDP) was a parliamentary group in the French Senate.

Formed after the 1968 Senate elections, the UCDP succeeded the Popular Republicans and Democratic Centre (RPCD) group. It was composed quasi-exclusively of members of the Centre des démocrates sociaux (CDS), the Christian democratic component of the Union for French Democracy.

Alain Poher, who served twice as interim president of the Republic and long-time president of the Senate, was a member of the UCDP.

== Presidents ==
- 1968–1971: André Colin
- 1971–1974: Roger Poudonson
- 1974–1976: André Fosset
- 1976–1983: Adolphe Chauvin

Chronology of the Centrist groups in the Senate
Popular Republicans (RP)	Popular Republicans and Democratic Centre (RPCD)	Centrist Union of Progressive Democrats (UCDP)	Centrist Union (UC)	Centrist and Republican Union (UCR)
_{1959}	_{1965}	_{1968}	_{1986}	_{2011}
