= André Colin =

French politician (1910–1978)

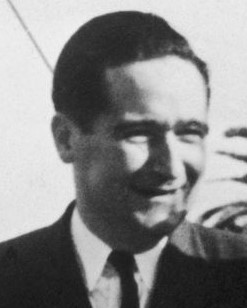
- Born: January 19, 1910; Brest, Finistère, France
- Died: August 29, 1978 (aged 68); Carantec, Finistère, France

André Colin (19 January 1910 – 29 August 1978) was a French politician. He served as a member of the National Assembly from 1945 to 1958, and as a member of the French Senate from 1959 to 1978, representing Finistère.

== Biography ==
The son of a solicitor and grandson of Jean-Pierre Soubigou, a member of a political dynasty from Plounéventer—one of whom served as a senator and another as a member of the National Assembly—he studied law in Angers and then in Paris, earning a doctorate in 1931. He taught law at the Catholic University of Lille from 1936 to 1939. During this period, he also served as president of Catholic Youth Action.

Drafted in 1939, he was assigned to the Navy in Beirut. After the armistice was signed on June 22, 1940, he made an appeal on Beirut radio calling for the fight to continue, but he was sent back to metropolitan France. He was a member of the National Council of the Resistance in 1942. His service in the Resistance earned him the title of Knight of the Legion of Honor for his work in the Resistance, as well as the 1939–1945 War Cross with palms and the Resistance Medal with rosette.

After the Liberation, he served as a member of the Provisional Consultative Assembly in 1944–45. He was subsequently elected to the Constituent Assemblies of 1945 and 1946. He was elected to represent Finistère following the 1946 legislative elections.

André Colin was a leading figure in the MRP (Popular Republican Movement), having played a key role in its founding through networks of Christian resistance fighters. He served as its secretary-general from 1944 to 1955, and then as its president from 1959 to 1963.

It was in this capacity that he pursued a distinguished career in government, serving in numerous cabinets during the French Fourth Republic.

Following the 1959 French Senate elections, he became a senator for Finistère. Re-elected in 1962 and 1971, he held that seat until his death in 1978. He served as chairman of the MRP-Union Démocrate caucus from 1963 to 1971.

He is the father of four children, including Anne-Marie Idrac, former president of the SNCF.

A ship operated by Penn-ar-Bed (company), the company responsible for service to Ouessant, was named after him in 1996.

Presidents of Brittany
President	Party	Term
René Pleven	DC	1974–1976
André Colin	CDS	1976–1978
Raymond Marcellin	UDF-PR	1978–1986
Yvon Bourges	RPR	1986–1998
Josselin de Rohan	RPR/UMP	1998–2004
Jean-Yves Le Drian	PS	2004–
