= Gilbert Barbier =

French politician

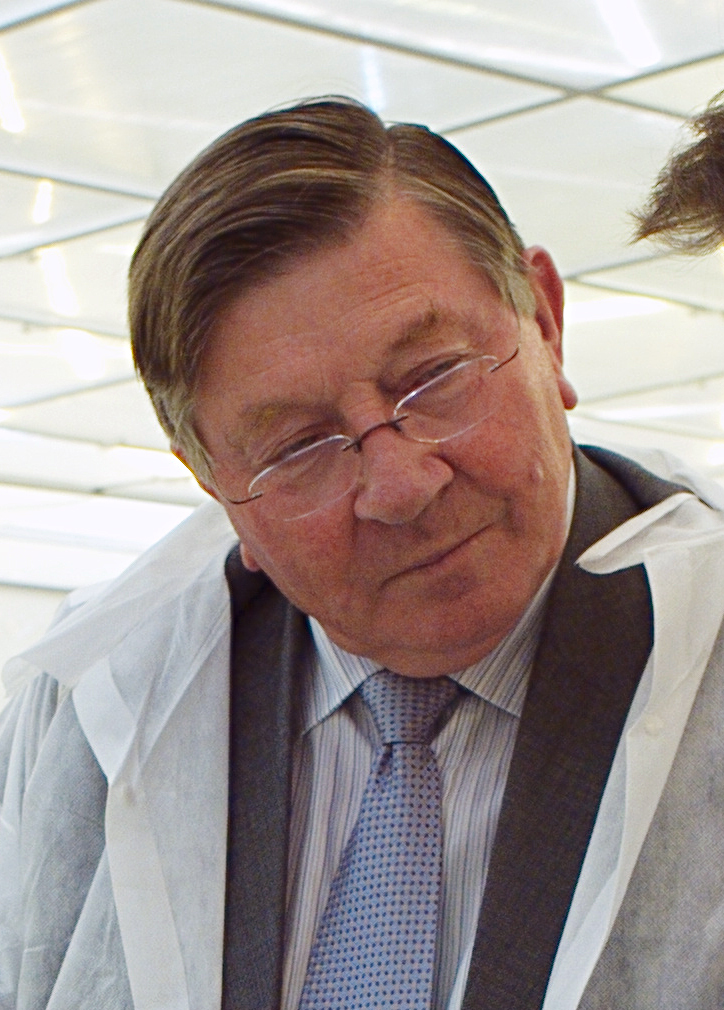
Gilbert Barbier - visite INRA Versailles

Gilbert Barbier (born 3 March 1940 in Amancey) was a member of the Senate of France, representing the Jura department.
