= Senate (French Third Republic) =

Upper house of the French legislature under the Third Republic (1875–1940)

Senate (French Third Republic) Sénat de la Troisième République
- French Third Republic
- Flag of France

Type
- Type: Upper house

History
- Established: 8 March 1876
- Disbanded: 31 May 1942
- Preceded by: National Assembly of 1871 (1871–1876)
- Succeeded by: Constituent Assembly of 1945

Leadership
- President of the Republic: 14 presidents: first: Adolphe Thiers, last: Albert Lebrun
- Senate President: 15 presidents: first: Gaston d'Audiffret-Pasquier, last: Jules Jeanneney

Structure
- Seats: 300

Meeting place
- Royal Opera of Versailles, then Palais du Luxembourg from 3 November 1879, Bordeaux from 14 June 1940, and Vichy from 2 July 1940

Constitution
- Constitutional Laws of 1875

The Senate (French: Sénat) under the French Third Republic was one of two legislative bodies, alongside the Chamber of Deputies, established by the Constitutional Laws of 1875 on 24 and 25 February 1875. It operated as the upper house in a strict bicameral system, where both chambers held equal legislative powers. Laws required identical approval from both chambers, with the Chamber of Deputies taking precedence only in initiating financial legislation. However, the President of the Republic needed the Senate's consent to dissolve the lower house.

Politically, the Senate's creation was a compromise between monarchists (divided between Orléanists and Legitimists) and republicans in the National Assembly. Republicans agreed to a conservative upper house in exchange for monarchist support for the Republic.

== Composition ==
The Senate initially consisted of 300 senators, with a minimum age of 40. Of these, 225 were elected indirectly by departmental electoral colleges, comprising deputies, general councilors, arrondissement councilors, and one representative per municipal council. Their term lasted nine years, with one-third renewable every three years. The remaining 75 were "life senators" chosen from the National Assembly and later co-opted by the Senate upon vacancies. Before its dissolution on 31 December 1875, the National Assembly appointed these 75 life senators between 9 November and 21 December, predominantly selecting republicans (58 of 75) despite the chamber's monarchist leanings.

The first election occurred on 30 January 1876, coinciding with the Chamber of Deputies election campaign. Conservatives (Catholics, Bonapartists, and counter-revolutionaries) narrowly secured a majority with 151 seats against 149 for republicans and the far left. The Duke Gaston d'Audiffret-Pasquier was elected Senate President, but moderates from both sides soon collaborated to shape public policy, aligning with the framers' intentions.

== Evolution ==
During the 16 May 1877 crisis, the Senate, consulted by President MacMahon, approved the dissolution of the Chamber of Deputies on 22 June 1877 by a vote of 149 to 130, formalized by MacMahon on 25 June 1877.

The first partial renewal on 5 January 1879 was a significant defeat for conservatives, with republicans gaining a lead of over 40 seats (174 to 126). The new president, Louis Martel, was a moderate republican. The republican shift in both chambers pressured the Dufaure ministry to purge the civil service, contributing to MacMahon's resignation.

The 1884 constitutional revision abolished life senators (effective upon their deaths) and expanded the electoral college to favor urban communes. The last life senator, Émile de Marcère, died in 1918. In the first two decades, radicals repeatedly proposed abolishing the Senate. However, its moderation helped counter Boulangism, leading radicals to abandon their calls for its suppression.

== Constitutional crisis ==
Under the Constitution, ministers were collectively accountable to both chambers. Until 1890, governments typically resigned only after no-confidence votes in the Chamber of Deputies. However, the Tirard government resigned after a Senate no-confidence vote in 1890, though this was more a pretext than a substantive rebuke.

In 1885, Jules Ferry argued: "In all free nations and parliamentary constitutions, the power to make or break ministries belongs to only one of the two chambers." This issue divided jurists and politicians until 1896, when the Senate, hostile to the Bourgeois government for its left-leaning policies, refused to resign despite three adverse votes. The Senate then blocked military funding for repatriating the Madagascar expeditionary force, forcing Bourgeois's resignation. This precedent established the Senate's role in governmental instability, particularly after World War I.

== High Court ==
The Senate could serve as a High Court for cases involving treason or malfeasance by the President or threats to state security, inheriting this role from the Chamber of Peers. It judged cases against Paul Déroulède in 1899, Louis Malvy in 1918, and Joseph Caillaux in 1920.

== Senatorial elections ==
Except for the initial 1876 election, which selected the first 225 elected senators (with 75 life senators appointed by the National Assembly in December 1875), senatorial elections renewed one-third of the seats every three years. Due to World War I, Series B and C elections (scheduled for 1915 and 1918) were postponed by laws of 24 December 1914 and 31 December 1917. After the 7 July 1929 law, elections occurred in mid-October before the mandate's expiration, typically in January.

| Senatorial Elections | Municipal Elections (Electoral College) | Renewal |
|---|---|---|
| 30 January 1876 | 22 and 29 September 1874 | Full |
| 5 January 1879 | 6 and 13 January 1878 | Series B |
| 8 January 1882 | 6 and 13 January 1878 | Series C |
| 25 January 1885 | 4 and 11 May 1884 | Series A |
| 5 January 1888 | 4 and 11 May 1884 | Series B |
| 4 January 1891 | 6 and 13 May 1888 | Series C |
| 7 January 1894 | 1 and 8 May 1892 | Series A |
| 3 January 1897 | 3 and 10 May 1896 | Series B |
| 28 January 1900 | 3 and 10 May 1896 | Series C |
| 4 January 1903 | 6 and 13 May 1900 | Series A |
| 7 January 1906 | 1 and 8 May 1904 | Series B |
| 3 January 1909 | 3 and 10 May 1908 | Series C |
| 7 January 1912 | 3 and 10 May 1908 | Series A |
| 11 January 1920 | 30 November and 7 December 1919 | Series A/B/C |
| 9 January 1921 | 30 November and 7 December 1919 | Series A |
| 6 January 1924 | 30 November and 7 December 1919 | Series B |
| 9 January 1927 | 3 and 10 May 1925 | Series C |
| 20 October 1929 | 5 and 12 May 1929 | Series A |
| 16 October 1932 | 5 and 12 May 1929 | Series B |
| 20 October 1935 | 5 and 12 May 1935 | Series C |
| 23 October 1938 | 5 and 12 May 1935 | Series A |

The series covered metropolitan departments alphabetically, plus overseas departments:

- Series A: Ain to Gard inclusive, plus Algiers, Guadeloupe, and Réunion.
- Series B: Haute-Garonne to Oise inclusive, plus Constantine and Martinique.
- Series C: Orne to Yonne, plus Oran and French India.

== Senate presidents ==
- 13 March 1876 – 15 January 1879: Gaston d'Audiffret-Pasquier
- 15 January 1879 – 25 May 1880: Louis Martel
- 25 May 1880 – 30 January 1882: Léon Say
- 2 February 1882 – 24 February 1893: Philippe Le Royer
- 24 February 1893 – 17 March 1893: Jules Ferry
- 27 March 1893 – 16 January 1896: Paul-Armand Challemel-Lacour
- 16 January 1896 – 21 February 1899: Émile Loubet
- 3 March 1899 – 13 February 1906: Armand Fallières
- 16 February 1906 – 14 January 1920: Antonin Dubost
- 14 January 1920 – 22 February 1923: Léon Bourgeois
- 22 February 1923 – 17 June 1924: Gaston Doumergue
- 19 June 1924 – 14 January 1927: Justin Germain Casimir de Selves
- 14 January 1927 – 11 June 1931: Paul Doumer
- 11 June 1931 – 3 June 1932: Albert Lebrun
- 3 June 1932 – 10 July 1940: Jules Jeanneney (de facto, as during the Occupation, the Senate and Chamber of Deputies were adjourned indefinitely, with only the head of state able to reconvene them, effectively establishing the authoritarian Vichy regime.)

Loubet, Fallières, Doumergue, Doumer, and Lebrun were elected President of the Republic during their Senate presidency.

== See also ==
- Constitutional Laws of 1875
- Life senator
- Senate (France)
