= Rally of Democrats, Progressive and Independent group =

French Senate parliamentary group

Rally of Democrats, Progressive and Independent Groupe Rassemblement des démocrates, progressistes et indépendants
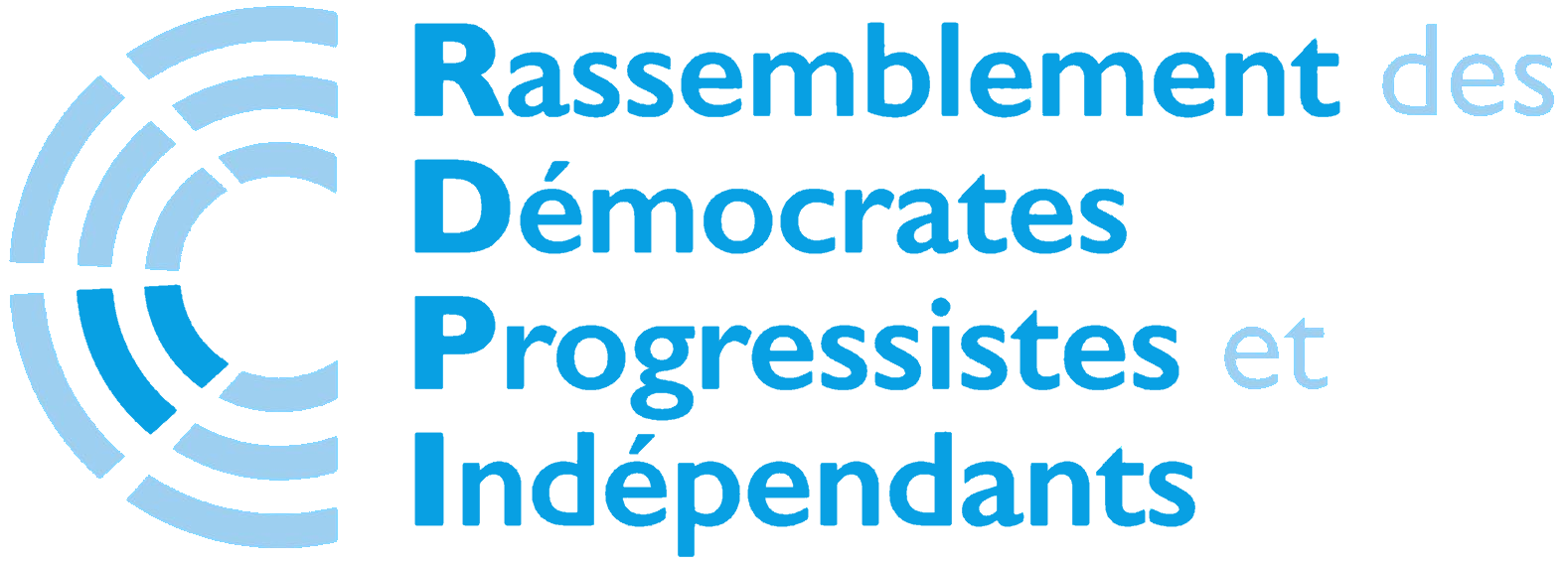
- Chamber: Senate
- Foundation: 28 June 2017
- Member parties: RE
- President: Xavier Iacovelli
- Constituency: Hauts-de-Seine
- Representation: 16 / 348
- Ideology: Liberalism

The Rally of Democrats, Progressive and Independent (French: Groupe Rassemblement des démocrates, progressistes et indépendants), formerly known as La République En Marche (French: groupe La République en marche), is a parliamentary group in the Senate of France including representatives of Renaissance (RE).

== History ==
The La République En Marche group in the Senate was officially by François Patriat, its first president, on 28 June 2017, and included 25 members, of which 23 left from the socialist group. The group contained 29 members before the 2017 renewal.

== List of presidents ==
Name	Image	Term start	Term end	Notes
François Patriat		28 June 2017	19 August 2026	
Xavier Iacovelli		5 October 2026		

== Historical membership ==
Year	Leader	Seats	Change	Series	Notes
2017	François Patriat	21 / 348	▼8	1	
2020	François Patriat	23 / 348	▲2	2	
2023	François Patriat	21 / 348	▼2	1	

== See also ==
- Renaissance group (National Assembly)
