= 2004 French Senate election =

- September 26, 2004

A third of seats (117) to the French Senate
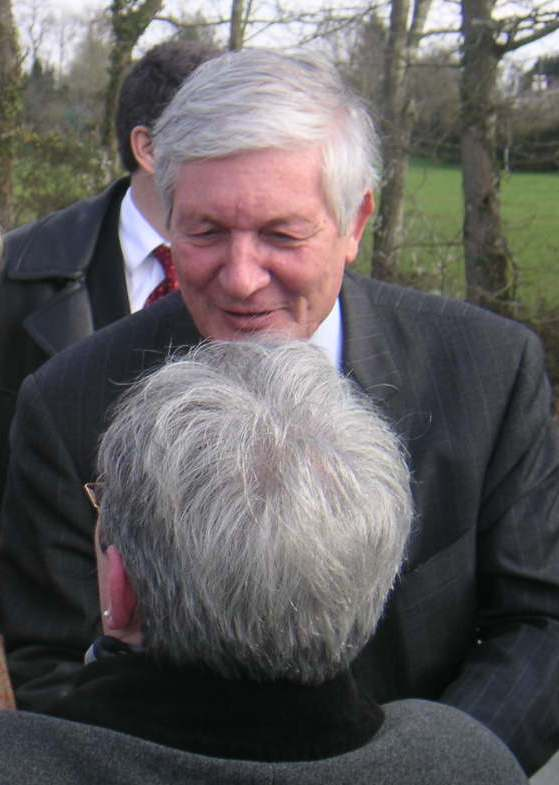

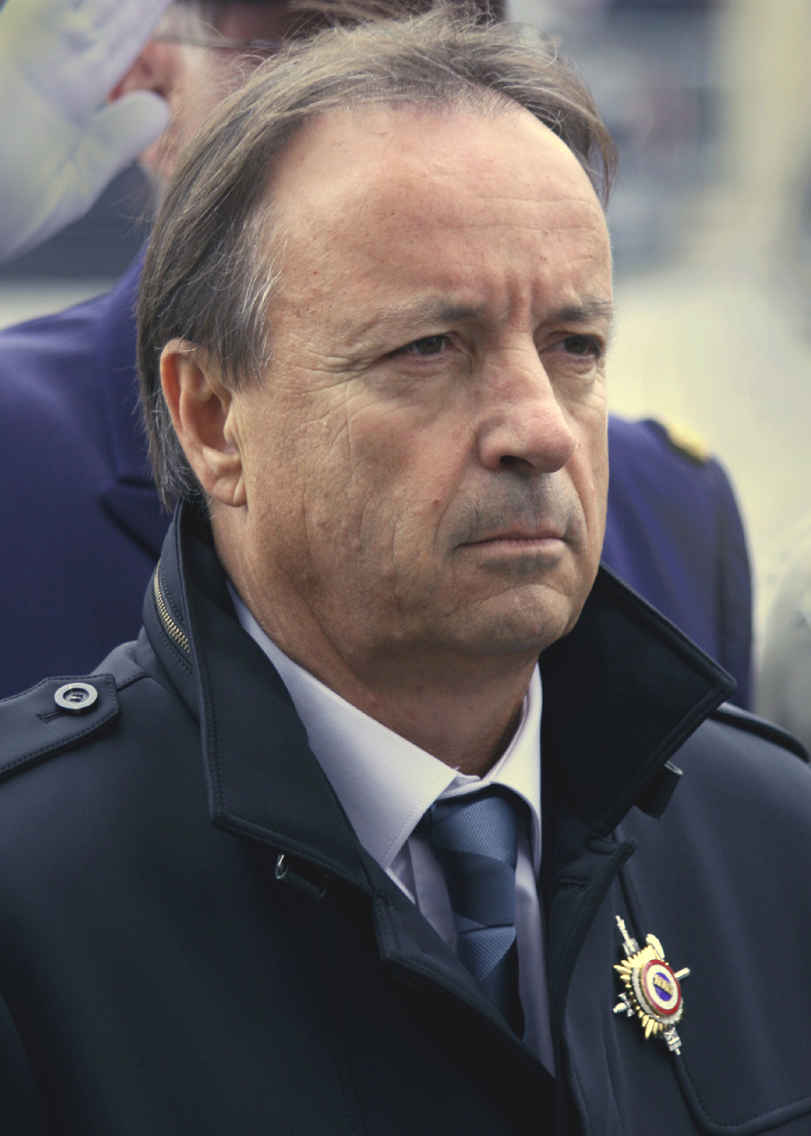

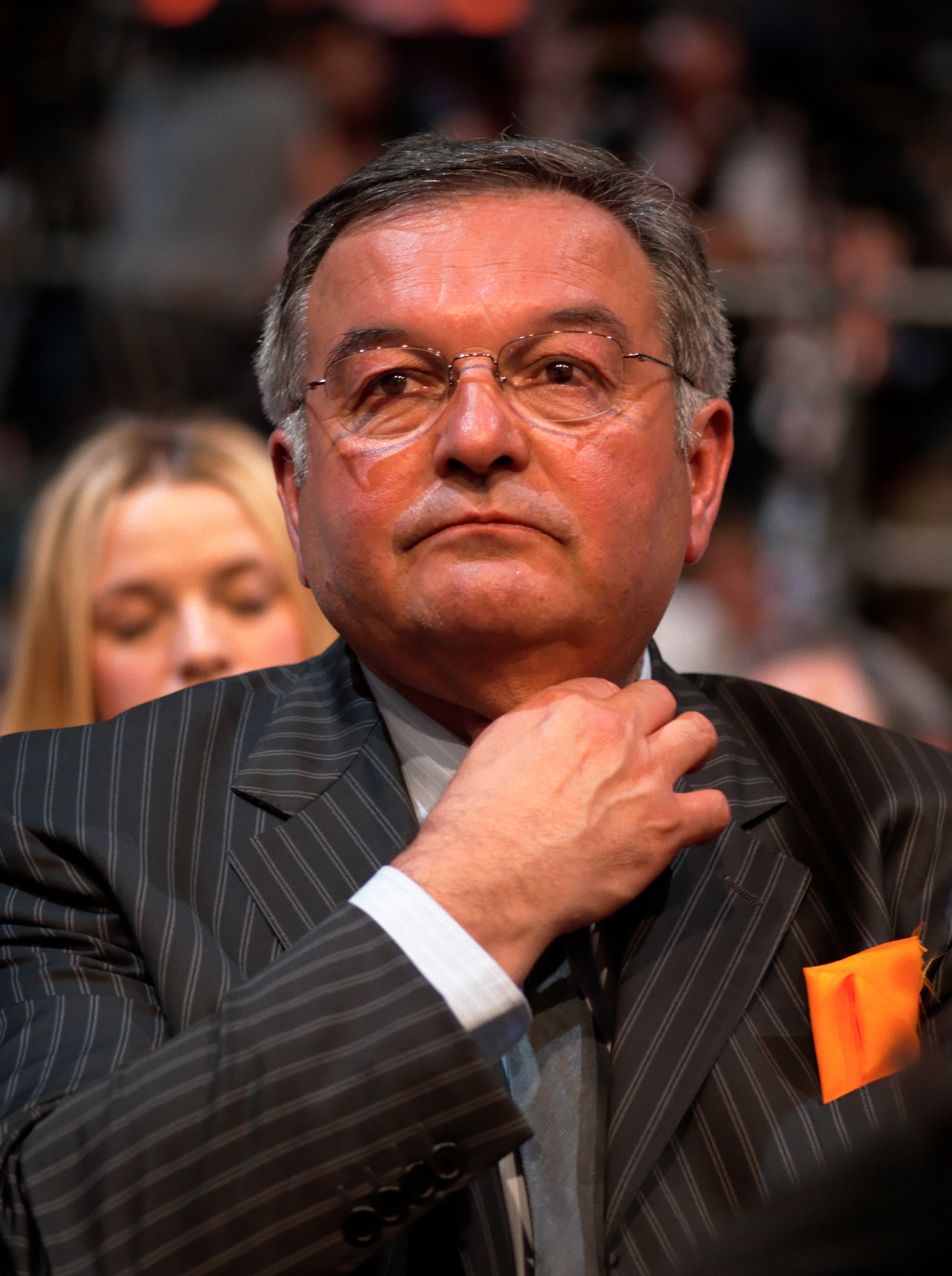
	First party	Second party	Third party
Leader	Josselin de Rohan	Jean-Pierre Bel	Michel Mercier
Party	UMP	PS	UDF
Leader's seat	Morbihan	Ariège	Rhône
Last election	162	83	31
Seats won	155	97	33
Seat change	▼7	▲14	▲2
President of the Senate before election
Christian Poncelet
UMP
Elected President of the Senate
Christian Poncelet
UMP

Following the end of the 9-year terms of 127 "series C" senators, indirect senatorial elections were held in France on September 26, 2004.

This was the last renewal of serie C senators- following the electoral reform, senators are not elected by thirds to nine-year terms but by halves to six-year terms.

Since 2001, 10 seats had been added to Senate. This election elected Senators from 28 departments on the mainland (115 seats including 107 incumbents and 8 new seats), 2 from Guadeloupe and Martinique (5 seats including 4 incumbents and one new seat), 2 from overseas territories, Mayotte and Saint-Pierre-et-Miquelon (3 seats including 2 incumbents and one new seat), and 4 senators representing French citizens abroad.

The 117 incumbents were divided in the following way:

- 65 from the Union for a Popular Movement (UMP) group
- 23 from the Socialist Party group
- 11 from the Communiste, Républicain et Citoyen group
- 10 from the Union Centriste-Union for French Democracy
- 7 from the Rassemblement démocratique et social européen
- 1 miscellaneous from the MPF

== Results ==
Group	Seats (2001)	Seats (2004)	Change
UMP Group	162	155	–7
Socialist Group	83	97	+14
Centrist Union - UDF Group	31	33	+2
Communist, Republican and Citizen Group	23	23	±0
Democratic, Social, and European Rally	17	16	–1
Non-Inscrits	5	7	+2
Total:	321	331	+5
