= Laurent Degallaix =

French politician

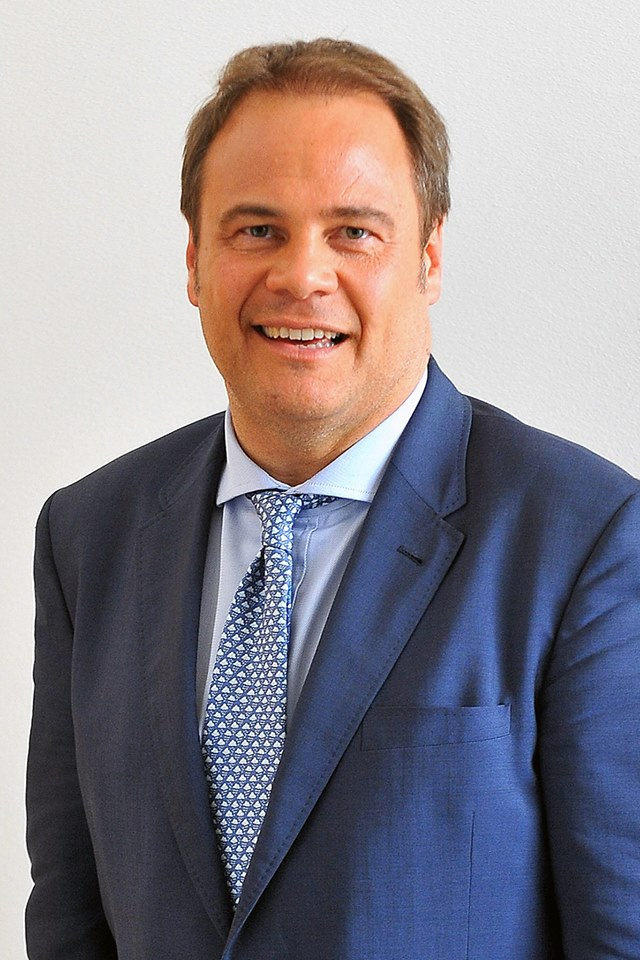

Member of Parliament
- In office June 30, 2014 – June 20, 2017
- Preceded by: Jean-Louis Borloo
- Succeeded by: Béatrice Descamps

Personal details
- Born: September 11, 1965 (age 60) Valenciennes, France
- Political party: Radical Movement (2017–2021); Horizons (since 2021)
- Occupation: Politician

Laurent Degallaix (born September 11, 1965, in Valenciennes, Nord, France) is a French politician. A member of the Radical Party, then the Radical Movement and finally the Horizons movement, he has been mayor of Valenciennes since 2012 and a member of parliament from 2014 to 2017.

== Political career ==
=== Mayor of Valenciennes ===
On June 28, 2012, he was elected mayor of Valenciennes by the municipal council, following the resignation of Dominique Riquet.

In the 2014 municipal elections, Laurent Degallaix was re-elected in the second round with 50.32% of votes cast, and a turnout of 53.40%. Vice-president of the Valenciennes Métropole agglomeration community in charge of finance since 2008, he was elected president in 2016.

On November 8, 2018, he was taken into police custody in connection with the sale of the municipal office Val' Hainaut Habitat. In 2019, he accepts the Lille public prosecutor's proposal to proceed with a plea bargaining procedure (CRPC) in the V2H case. He is fined 25,000 euros.

In June 2019, La République en marche announced its support for Laurent Degallaix for the 2020 municipal elections in Valenciennes. He specifies that he does not join the party, intending to keep his "autonomy". He is also the first mayor in the Nord department to be backed by LREM for these elections. The list he led won in the first round with 51% of the vote. He was re-elected mayor when the municipal council was installed on May 26, 2020.

=== Member of Parliament ===
Following the resignation of Jean-Louis Borloo, he was elected deputy in the 21st constituency of Nord in the legislative by-election held on June 22 and 29, 2014. After receiving 47% of the vote in the first round, he was elected with 72.14% of the vote in the second round and resigned from the regional council.

On September 6, 2014, he announced his support for Hervé Morin in the election for UDI president.

In December 2014, he mobilized alongside teachers at the Jean-Moulin secondary school in Wallers to safeguard the resources the school had thanks to the priority education scheme.

A supporter of Alain Juppé in the 2016 open Right and Center primary, he rallied to Emmanuel Macron's candidacy for the 2017 presidential election, but did not provide his sponsorship. Affected by the law on the accumulation of mandates, he does not seek re-election in the following legislative elections but becomes the deputy substitute for Béatrice Descamps.

Laurent Degallaix ran in the 2021 departmental elections in the canton of Valenciennes as a pair with senator Valérie Létard, against outgoing The Republicans (LR) councillors Yves Dusart and Geneviève Mannarino, whom he described as "interims ". The pair came out on top in the first round with almost 37% of the vote, then won the second round with 52.2%.

The same year, after the de facto demise of the MR, he joined the Horizons movement created by former Prime Minister Édouard Philippe. He became its referent for the Hauts-de-France region.

== Awards ==
- Ordre des Palmes académiques (decree of January 11, 2010)
