= Clara Martínez Alberola =

Spanish lawyer

Deputy Head of the UK Task Force
- In office 6 January 2020 – 31 March 2021
- Head: Michel Barnier
- Preceded by: Position established
- Succeeded by: João Vale de Almeida (As Ambassador to the United Kingdom)

Personal details
- Born: Valencia, Spain
- Education: University of Valencia

Clara Martínez Alberola (born 1963 in Valencia) is a Spanish lawyer and a European civil servant. From March 2018 to November 2019, she served as the Head of Cabinet to the President of the European Commission, Jean-Claude Juncker.

== Early life and education ==
Martínez Alberola studied law in Valencia before enrolling at the College of Europe. She speaks English, French, Italian and some Portuguese.

== Career ==
Martínez Alberola was one of the first Spanish citizens to join the European Civil Service in 1991, only a few years after her country's accession to the European Union. At the European Commission, she served as an expert in internal market affairs, enlargement and pharmaceutical issues with the Directorate-General for Internal Market, Industry, Entrepreneurship and SMEs before becoming an adviser to President of the European Commission José Manuel Barroso in 2005.

Later, Martínez Alberola held the role of deputy head of cabinet to the President of the European Commission, Jean-Claude Juncker, before being appointed head following the promotion of Martin Selmayr to Secretary General. At the time, she was the first woman to occupy the position of head of cabinet.

On 6 January 2020, Martínez Alberola was appointed Deputy to Deputy Head of the UK Task Force Michel Barnier for the post-Brexit trade negotiations.

== Personal life ==
Martínez Alberola is married to Italian lawyer and academic Massimo Merola. The couple lives in Brussels.
