= Valérie Létard =

French politician

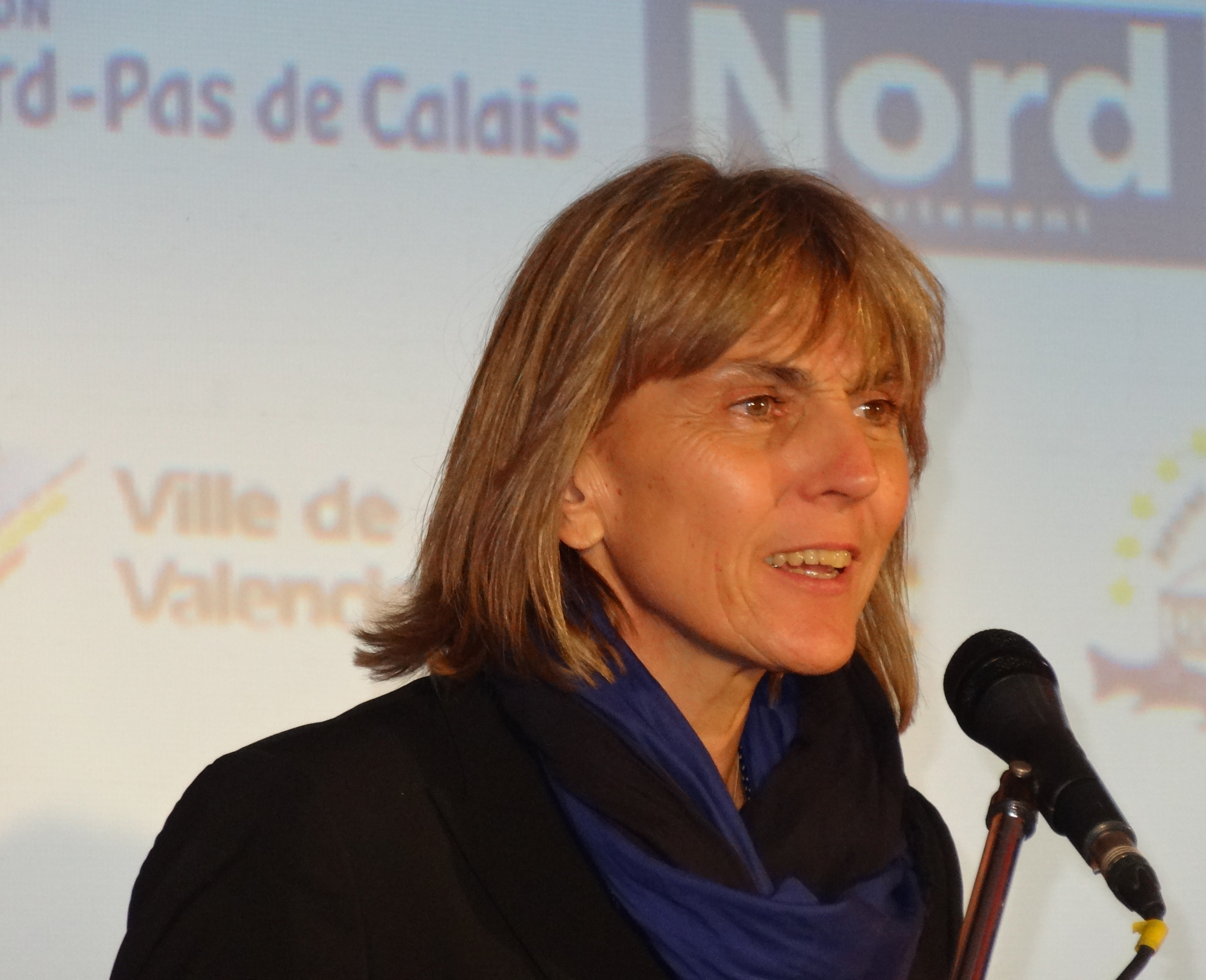
- Létard in 2013

Minister of Housing and Urban Renovation
- In office 21 September 2024 – 5 October 2025
- Prime Minister: Michel Barnier; François Bayrou
- Preceded by: Guillaume Kasbarian (Housing); Sabrina Agresti-Roubache (Urban Development)
- Succeeded by: Éric Woerth (Territorial Development, Decentralization and Housing)

Member of the National Assembly for Nord's 21st constituency
- In office 8 July 2024 – 21 October 2024
- Preceded by: Béatrice Descamps
- Succeeded by: Salvatore Castiglione

Senator for Nord
- In office 14 December 2010 – 2 October 2023
- In office 1 October 2001 – 19 July 2007

Vice President of the Senate
- In office 4 October 2017 – 2 October 2023
- President: Gérard Larcher

Secretary of State for Climate
- In office 23 June 2009 – 13 November 2010
- President: Nicolas Sarkozy
- Prime Minister: François Fillon

Secretary of State for Solidarity
- In office 19 June 2007 – 23 June 2009
- President: Nicolas Sarkozy
- Prime Minister: François Fillon

Departmental Councillor of Nord
- Incumbent
- Assumed office 1 July 2021
- Constituency: Canton of Valenciennes

Personal details
- Born: Valérie Decourrière; 13 October 1962 (age 63) Orchies, France
- Party: UDI (2012–present)
- Other political affiliations: PSD (until 1995); FD (1995–1998); UDF (1998–2007); LC-NC (2007–2014)
- Parent: Francis Decourrière (father)

Valérie Létard (French pronunciation: [valeʁi letaʁ]; born 13 October 1962) is a French politician of the Union of Democrats and Independents (UDI) who served as Minister of Housing in the government of Prime Minister Michel Barnier. She previously served in junior cabinet positions in the government of François Fillon from 2007 to 2010.

== Political career ==
=== Early career ===
Since 10 April 2008, Létard has been the president of the Valenciennes Agglomeration Community, elected with 83 percent of the vote.

=== Career in government ===
Létard served in the government of Prime Minister François Fillon under President of France Nicolas Sarkozy, first as Secretary of State for Solidarity (2007-2009) and later for Climate (2009-2010). During her time in office, she launched the government’s campaign in 2009 to warn potential victims of forced marriages and female genital mutilation.

=== Member of the Senate, 2010–2023 ===
In the Senate, Létard served on the Committee on Social Affairs and the Committee on Economic Affairs.

On 1 October 2011 Létard was a candidate for the Presidency of the Senate, against the outgoing president, Gérard Larcher (UMP) and Jean-Pierre Bel (PS). She received 29 votes.

Ahead of the Republicans’ 2016 primaries, Létard endorsed Alain Juppé as the party’s candidate for 2017 presidential elections. In March 2017, in the context of the Fillon affair, she called on LR candidate François Fillon to withdraw his candidacy.

Following the 2017 legislative elections, Létard reportedly refused offers to become Minister of Housing and Urban Affairs in Prime Minister Édouard Philippe’s government. On 4 October 2017 she was elected vice-president of the French Senate instead, under the leadership of Gérard Larcher.

=== Minister of Housing and Urban Renovation, 2024–present ===
On 21 September 2024, Létard appointed Minister of Housing and Urban Renovation in the government of Michel Barnier.
