= Cécile Gallez =

French politician (1936–2022)

Member of the National Assembly for Nord's 21st constituency
- In office 2002–2010
- Preceded by: Jean-Louis Borloo
- Succeeded by: Jean-Louis Borloo

Mayor of Saint-Saulve
- In office 1977–2020
- Preceded by: Fernand Cauchie
- Succeeded by: Yves Dusart

Personal details
- Born: Cécile Krämer; 16 May 1936 Raismes, France
- Died: 31 July 2022 (aged 86) Saint-Saulve, France
- Party: UMP; The Republicans
- Profession: Pharmacist

Cécile Gallez (16 May 1936 – 31 July 2022) was a French politician who was a member of the National Assembly of France. She represented the Nord department as a member of the Union for a Popular Movement.
