= Salvatore Castiglione (politician) =

French politician (born 1970)

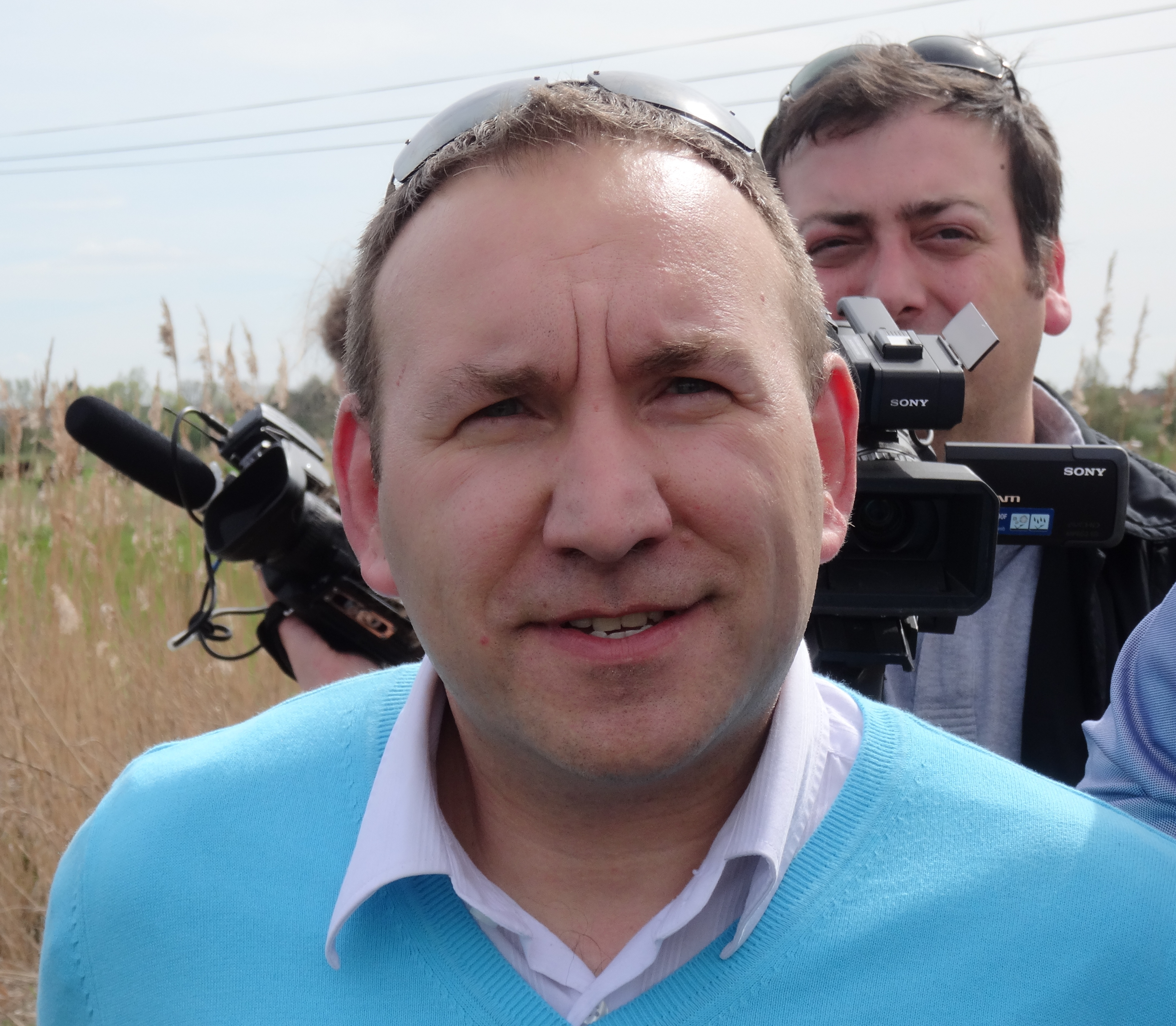
- Castiglione in 2014

Member of the French National Assembly for Nord's 21st constituency
- Incumbent
- Assumed office 22 October 2024
- Preceded by: Valérie Létard

Personal details
- Born: 18 February 1970 (age 56)
- Party: Union of Democrats and Independents

Salvatore Castiglione (born 18 February 1970) is a French politician serving as a member of the National Assembly since 2024. From 2008 to 2024, he served as mayor of Wallers.
