= Fabien Thiémé =

French politician (1952–2019)

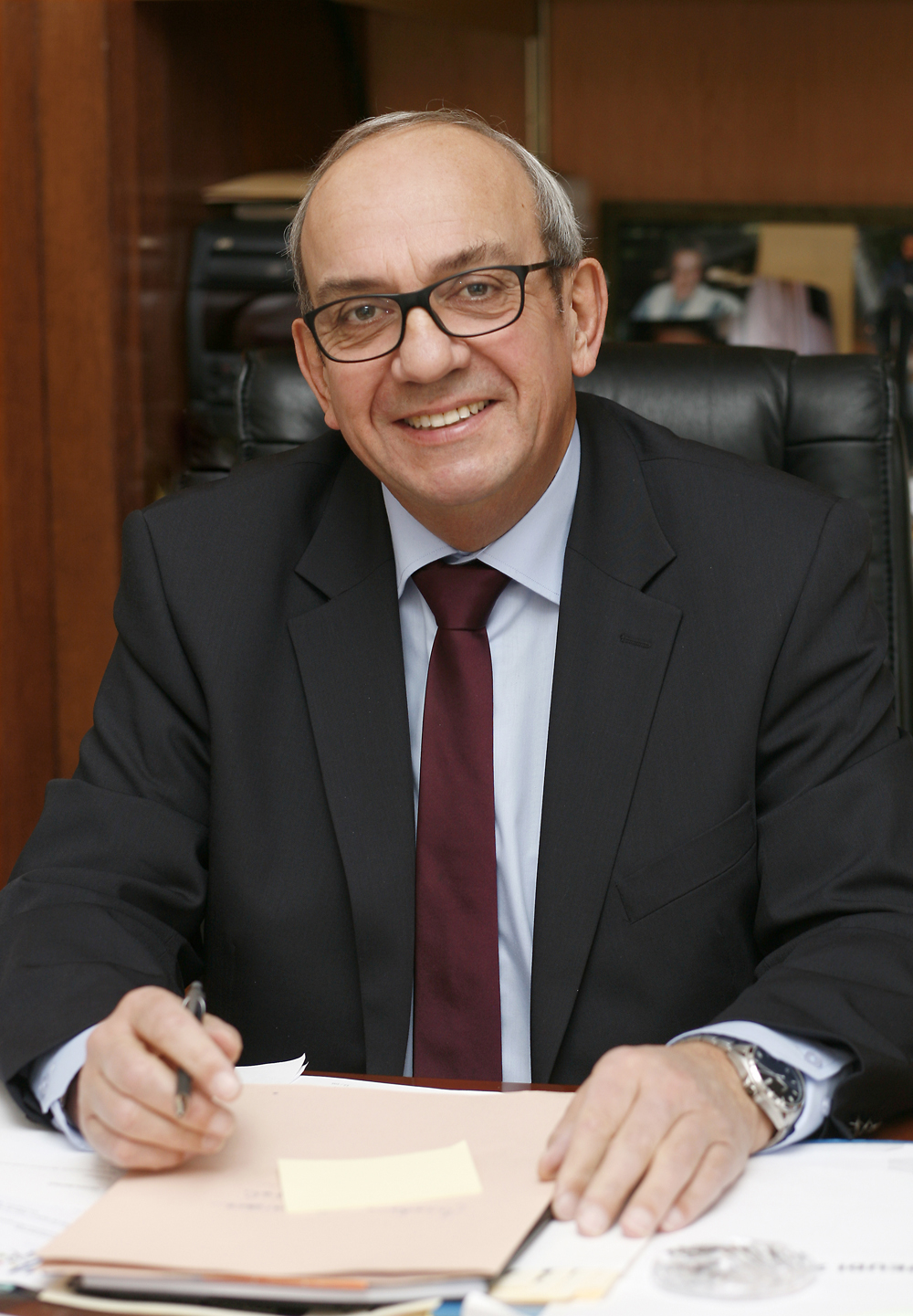
- Fabien Thiémé in 2015

Member of the National Assembly for Nord's 21st constituency
- In office 1988–1993
- Succeeded by: Jean-Louis Borloo

Mayor of Marly
- In office 2008–2019

Personal details
- Born: 11 July 1952 Valenciennes, France
- Died: 27 December 2019 (aged 67) France
- Party: PCF

Fabien Thiémé (11 July 1952 – 27 December 2019) was a French politician.

Thiémé was born in Valenciennes on 11 July 1952, to a railway worker father active in the General Confederation of Labour. Thiémé was elected to the National Assembly as a member of the French Communist Party from Nord's 21st constituency in 1988, using the slogan "the people's champion versus the champion of businesses." Jean-Louis Borloo defeated Thiémé in 1993. Thiémé served as mayor of Marly, Nord from 2008 until his death on 27 December 2019, aged 67.
