= Férin =

- Commune
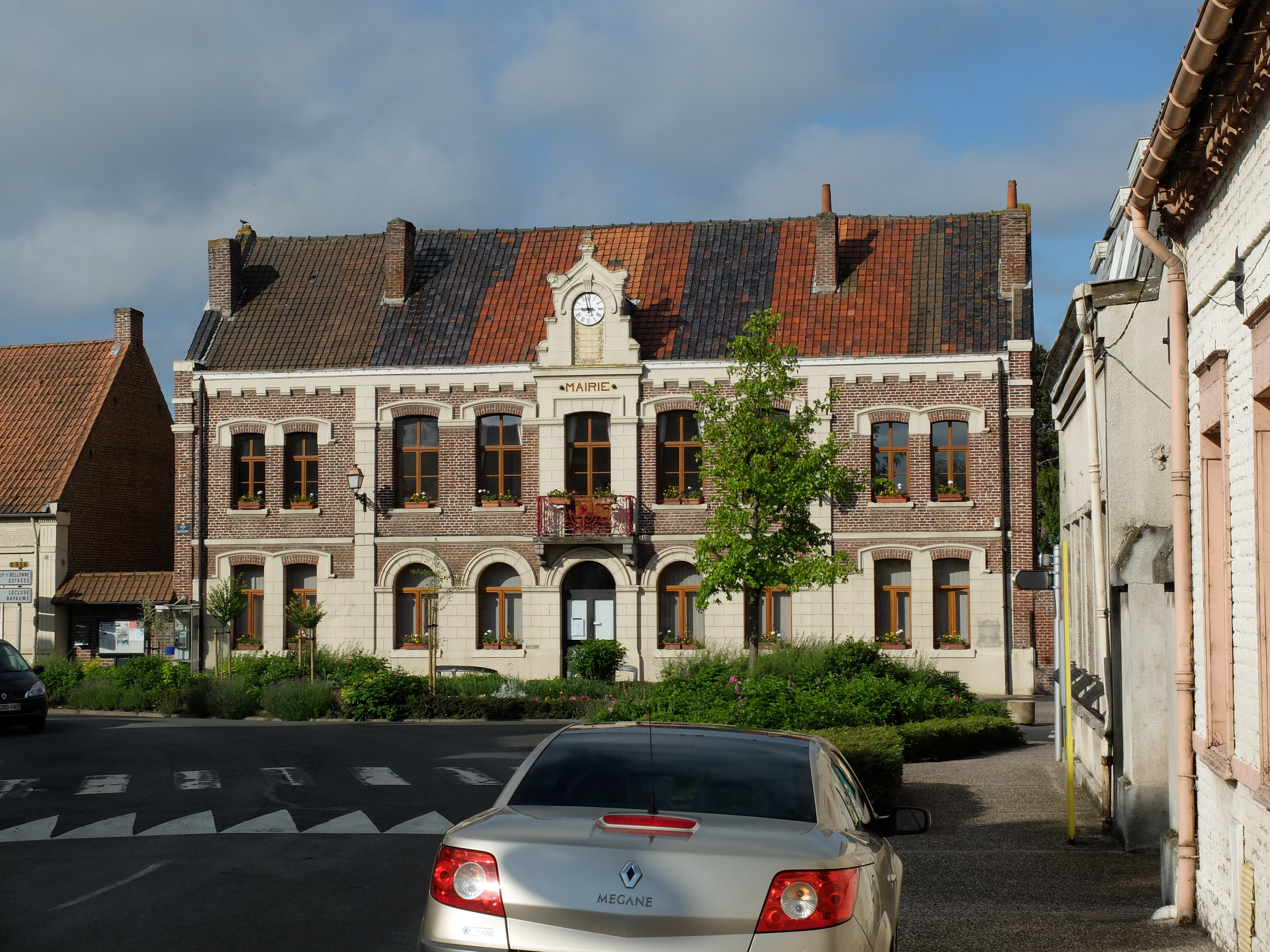
- The town hall in Férin

- Coat of arms
- Location of Férin
- Location within France Location within Hauts-de-France
- Coordinates: 50°19′41″N 3°04′26″E
- Country: France
- Region: Hauts-de-France
- Department: Nord
- Arrondissement: Douai
- Canton: Aniche
- Intercommunality: Douaisis Agglo

Government
  - Mayor (2020–2026): Michel Pederencino
- Area^{1}: 5.52 km^{2} (2.13 sq mi)
- Elevation: 34 m (112 ft)
- Highest elevation: 45 m (148 ft)
- Lowest elevation: 27 m (89 ft)
- Population (2023): 1,432
  - Density: 259/km^{2} (672/sq mi)
- Time zone: UTC+01:00 (CET)
  - Summer (DST): UTC+02:00 (CEST)
- INSEE/Postal code: 59228 /59169
- ^{1} French Land Register data, which excludes lakes, ponds, glaciers > 1 km^{2} (0.386 sq mi or 247 acres) and river estuaries.

Férin (French pronunciation: [feʁɛ̃]) is a commune in the Nord department in northern France.

It is 4 km (2.5 mi) south of Douai.

== History ==
- Paleolithic site, then roman occupation, "Férin" takes his name from ferinius. The local seigneurie belonged to the Saint-Amand abbey.
- In 1804, a red crock containing 1800 roman medals most of which were in the honour of Postumus was found. Postumus was an emperor of the Gallic Empire in the year 260 of the common era.

== Heraldry ==
Arms of Férin	The arms of Férin are blazoned : Or, an eagle sable dimidiated with Azure semy de lys Or. The latter being France Ancient (Dechy, Férin and Saint-Saulve use the same arms.)

== See also ==
- Communes of the Nord department
