= Dechy =

- Commune
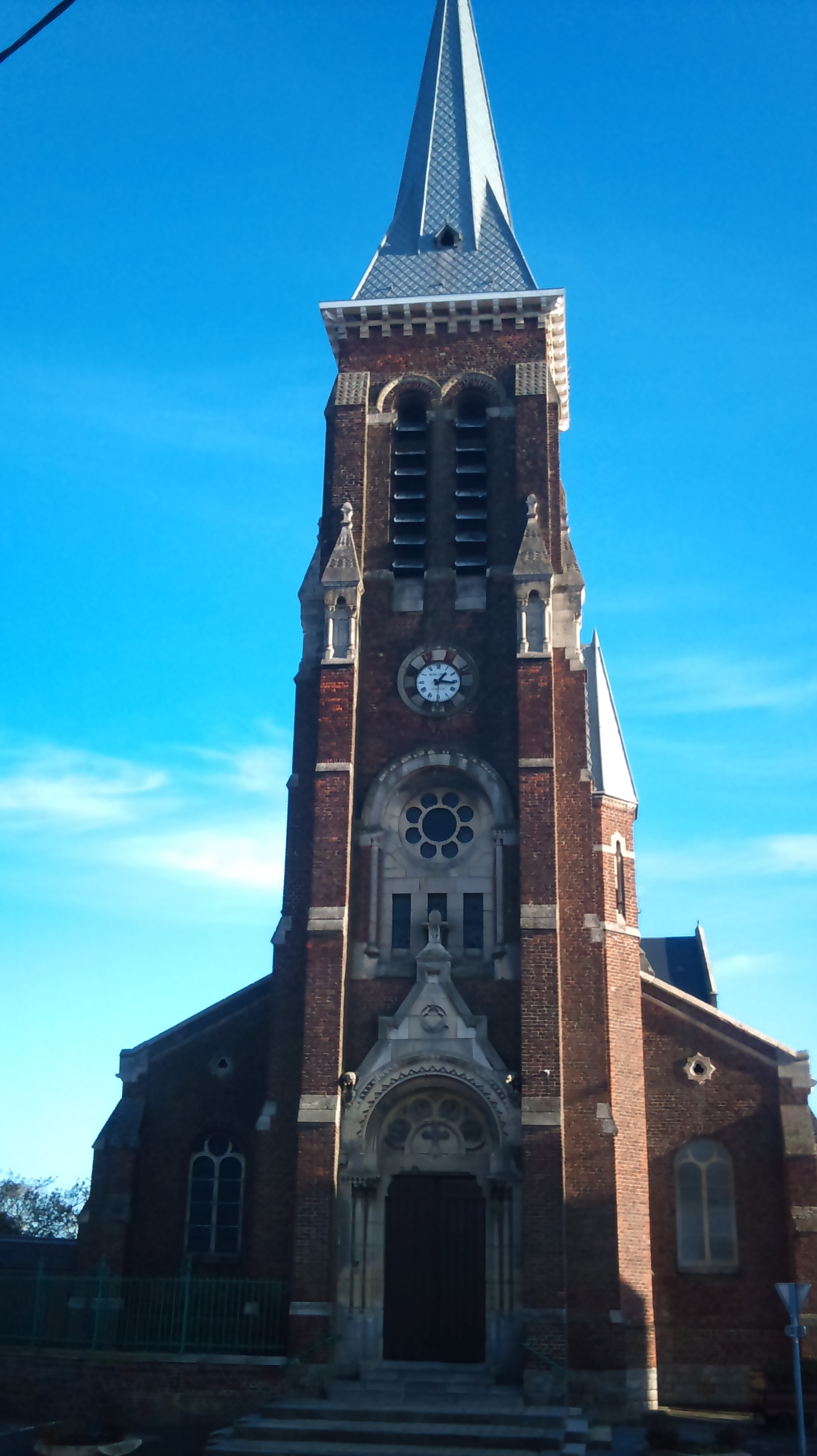
- The church in Dechy

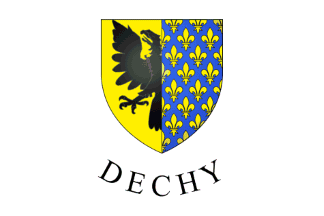
- Flag Coat of arms
- Location of Dechy
- Location within France Location within Hauts-de-France
- Coordinates: 50°21′11″N 3°07′44″E
- Country: France
- Region: Hauts-de-France
- Department: Nord
- Arrondissement: Douai
- Canton: Aniche
- Intercommunality: Douaisis Agglo

Government
  - Mayor (2020–2026): Jean-Michel Szatny
- Area^{1}: 9.27 km^{2} (3.58 sq mi)
- Elevation: 35 m (115 ft)
- Highest elevation: 46 m (151 ft)
- Lowest elevation: 18 m (59 ft)
- Population (2023): 5,338
  - Density: 576/km^{2} (1,490/sq mi)
- Time zone: UTC+01:00 (CET)
  - Summer (DST): UTC+02:00 (CEST)
- INSEE/Postal code: 59170 /59187
- Website: https://www.ville-dechy.fr/
- ^{1} French Land Register data, which excludes lakes, ponds, glaciers > 1 km^{2} (0.386 sq mi or 247 acres) and river estuaries.

Dechy (French pronunciation: [dəʃi]) is a commune in the Nord department in northern France.

== Population ==
Historical population

Year	Pop.	±% p.a.
1793	840	—
1821	1,158	+1.15%
1846	1,467	+0.95%
1872	1,888	+0.98%
1901	2,722	+1.27%
1926	4,744	+2.25%
1946	5,081	+0.34%
1962	6,348	+1.40%
1968	6,156	−0.51%

Year	Pop.	±% p.a.
1975	6,630	+1.07%
1982	5,720	−2.09%
1990	5,464	−0.57%
1999	5,283	−0.37%
2007	5,041	−0.58%
2012	5,207	+0.65%
2017	5,324	+0.45%
2023	5,338	+0.04%

Source: EHESS and INSEE (1968-2023)

== Toponymy ==
The town has been named, Diptiacum in 899, (Cartulary of Saint-Amand, Miroeus), Diptiacum in 906, Diciacum in 1097, Diptiacum in 1107, Dichis in 1181 (Chronique Gislebert), Dici in 1205

It probably comes from an old *Deppiacum, based of the gallic name Deppios followed from the suffix -acum (from the gallic -acon) of location and property, with the global meaning « property, farm of Deppios ». The suffix -(i)acum has generally finished as -y in the North (-ecque in the previous dutch speaking area and -eke in flemish), the plural form, appeared later -iacas to -ies.

== History ==
=== Middle Age ===
The archeological statistics of the Nord departement of 1867 indicate:

- Since 7th century, Dechy containing maybe Férin belonged to the Saint-Amand Abbay. The count of Ostrevent had advocatus that was explaining Dechy and Férin of Hainaut county, although near of Douai.
- A hospital was already existing in 1218; the patient care was doneby the sisters of the Abbaye of Beaulieu in Sin-le-Noble
- In 1205, the abbe Jean gave to his vassals of Dechy and Férin a penal law copied from the one in Douai.

== Heraldry ==
Arms of Dechy	The arms of Dechy are blazoned : Or, an eagle sable dimidiated with Azure semy de lys Or. The latter being France Ancient (Dechy, Férin and Saint-Saulve use the same arms.)

== See also ==
- Communes of the Nord department
