= Nord's 21st constituency =

Constituency of the National Assembly of France

21st constituency of the Nord
- inline Constituency of the National Assembly of France

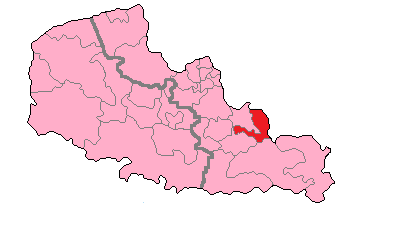
- Nord's 21st constituency shown within Nord-Pas-de-Calais
- Deputy: Valérie Létard; UDI
- Department: Nord
- Cantons: Condé-sur-l'Escault (excluding the communes of Escautpont, Fresnes-sur-Escaut, Hergnies, Odomez, Vicq), Valenciennes Est. Communes de : Valenciennes (parts included in the cantons of Valenciennes Nord and Valenciennes Sud), Saint-Saulve
- Registered voters: 81,076

The 21st constituency of the Nord is a French legislative constituency in the Nord département.

== Description ==
Prior to 1988, the 21st constituency was the constituency of Avesnes-sur-Helpe in the southeastern part of the department. It now contains most of Valenciennes as well as some surrounding areas.

Long serving representative and former Minister of Economy, Finance and Industry Jean-Louis Borloo resigned from the seat in April 2014 due to ill health and was replaced by Mayor of Valenciennes Laurent Degallaix following a by-election.

== Historic Representatives ==
Election	Member	Party
1958	Arthur Moulin	UNR
1962	Arthur Moulin	UNR
1967	Charles Naveau	SFIO
1968	Arthur Moulin	UDR
1973	Charles Naveau	PS
1978	Marceau Gauthier	PCF
1981	Marcel Dehoux	PS
1986	Proportional representation - no election by constituency	
1988	Fabien Thiémé	PCF
1993	Jean-Louis Borloo	DVD
1997	Jean-Louis Borloo	UDF
2002	Jean-Louis Borloo	PRV
2002	Cécile Gallez	UMP
2002	Jean-Louis Borloo	PRV
2002	Cécile Gallez	UMP
2007	Jean-Louis Borloo	PRV
2007	Cécile Gallez	UMP
2010	Jean-Louis Borloo	PRV
2012	Jean-Louis Borloo	PRV
2014	Laurent Degallaix	UDI
2017	Béatrice Descamps	UDI
2022	Béatrice Descamps	UDI
2024	Valérie Létard	UDI

== Election results ==
=== 2024 ===
Legislative Election 2024: Nord's 21st constituency
Party	Candidate	Votes	%	±%
LFI (NFP)	Pierrick Colpin	11,290	23.08	−0.40
LO	Édith Duquesnoy	726	1.48	n/a
DLF	Laurent Lasselin	709	1.45	n/a
RN	Laurence Bara	21,337	43.61	+14.99
REC	Séverine Duminy	580	1.19	−2.09
UDI (Ensemble)	Valérie Létard	14,280	29.19	−6.24
Turnout		48,922	97.53	+55.64
Registered electors		81,160		
2nd round result
UDI	Valérie Létard	24,485	51.59	+22.40
RN	Laurence Bara	22,974	48.41	+4.80
Turnout		47,459	96.91	−0.62
Registered electors		81,173		
UDI hold		Swing		

=== 2022 ===
Legislative Election 2022: Nord's 21st constituency
Party	Candidate	Votes	%	±%
UDI (UDC)	Béatrice Descamps	11,769	35.43	+2.03
RN	Océane Valentin	9,508	28.62	+6.72
LFI (NUPÉS)	Luce Troadec	7,798	23.48	−4.74
DVD	Laurent Lasselin	1,091	3.28	N/A
REC	Corinne Laire	1,089	3.28	N/A
PA	Ludovic Aubry	1,046	3.15	N/A
Others	N/A	915		
Turnout		33,216	41.89	+0.14
2nd round result
UDI (UDC)	Béatrice Descamps	17,199	57.12	-5.60
RN	Océane Valentin	12,909	42.88	+5.60
Turnout		30,108	39.59	+1.59
UDI hold				

=== 2017 ===
Candidate	Label	First round		Second round	
Candidate	Label	Votes	%	Votes	%
Béatrice Descamps	UDI	11,170	33.41	18,126	62.72
Valérie Caudron	FN	7,323	21.90	10,774	37.28
Ophélie Tricot	FI	4,704	14.07		
Didier Legrand	DVD	3,004	8.98		
Christine Laurent	PS	1,840	5.50		
Patrick Kolebacki	PCF	1,578	4.72		
Pauline Pottier	ECO	1,315	3.93		
Laurent Lasselin	DVD	1,089	3.26		
Édith Weisshaupt	EXG	343	1.03		
Jean-Luc François Laurent	EXD	324	0.97		
Christine Braet	DIV	242	0.72		
Yazid Amara	DIV	225	0.67		
Sally Haddar	DVG	210	0.63		
Sylvain Damiani	DIV	70	0.21		
Votes		33,437	100.00	28,900	100.00
Valid votes		33,437	96.97	28,900	92.09
Blank votes		809	2.35	1,771	5.64
Null votes		236	0.68	713	2.27
Turnout		34,482	41.75	31,384	38.00
Abstentions		48,113	58.25	51,205	62.00
Registered voters		82,595		82,589	
Source: Ministry of the Interior

=== 2014 by-election ===
2014 by-election: Nord's 21st constituency
Party	Candidate	Votes	%	±%
UDI	Laurent Degallaix	9,701	47.02	
FN	Jean-Luc Laurent	3,856	18.69	
FG	Patrick Kolebacki	2,120	10.27	
DVD	Didier Legrand	2,100	10.18	
PS	Alexandre Raskza	1,470	7.12	
EELV	Frédéric Bigot	735	3.56	
Others	N/A	651		
Turnout		20,960	25.84	
2nd round result
UDI	Laurent Degallaix	13,058	72.14	
FN	Jean-Luc Laurent	5,043	27.86	
Turnout		19,298	23.79	
UDI gain from PRV				

=== 2012 ===
Legislative Election 2012: Nord's 21st constituency
Party	Candidate	Votes	%	±%
PRV	Jean-Louis Borloo	18,452	42.99	
FG	Fabien Thiémé	10,445	24.33	
EELV	Sandrine Rousseau	7,171	16.71	
FN	Guy Cannie	6,045	14.08	
Others	N/A	809		
Turnout		42,922	52.94	
2nd round result
PRV	Jean-Louis Borloo	22,959	55.83	
FG	Fabien Thiémé	18,166	44.17	
Turnout		41,125	50.72	
PRV gain from UMP				

=== 2007 ===
Legislative Election 2007: Nord 21st
Party	Candidate	Votes	%	±%
UMP	Jean-Louis Borloo	23,605	53.69	
PCF	Fabien Thiémé	8,511	19.36	
PS	Jean-Luc Chagnon	6,252	14.22	
FN	Dominique Slabolepszy	2,243	5.10	
LV	Katia Bittner	838	1.91	
LCR	Anne Wattel	738	1.68	
CPNT	Laurence Gilbert	528	1.20	
LO	Eric Pecqueur	422	0.96	
MEI	Luc Lebrun	294	0.67	
MPF	Béatrice Jobbe-Duval	267	0.61	
MNR	Noël Dugardin	177	0.40	
DIV	Pierre Liso	81	0.18	
DIV	Vincent Roussel	7	0.02	
Turnout		44,605	56.63	
UMP hold		Swing		

=== 2002 ===
Legislative Election 2002: Nord's 21st constituency
Party	Candidate	Votes	%	±%
UMP	Jean-Louis Borloo	22,150	49.51	
PCF	Fabien Thiémé	7,729	17.28	
FN	Dominique Slabolepszy	6,026	13.47	
PS	Valerie Levin	5,519	12.34	
Others	N/A	3,312		
Turnout		45,301	60.32	
2nd round result
UMP	Jean-Louis Borloo	25,865	63.88	
PCF	Fabien Thiémé	14,627	36.12	
Turnout		41,721	55.56	
UMP gain from UDF				

=== 1997 ===
Legislative Election 1997: Nord's 21st constituency
Party	Candidate	Votes	%	±%
UDF	Jean-Louis Borloo	17,019	34.27	
PCF	Fabien Thiémé	11,154	22.46	
FN	Dominique Slabolepszy	7,879	15.86	
PS	Bernard Frimat	7,230	14.56	
RPR	Philippe Duée*	2,136	4.30	
LO	Martial Esmans	1,169	2.35	
DVE	Alain Deruche	1,078	2.17	
Others	N/A	2,000		
Turnout		51,374	69.15	
2nd round result
UDF	Jean-Louis Borloo	26,224	52.79	
PCF	Fabien Thiémé	23,452	47.21	
Turnout		52,225	70.30	
UDF gain from DVD				

* RPR dissident

=== 1993 ===
Legislative Election 1993: Nord 21st - 2nd round
Party	Candidate	Votes	%	±%
DVD	Jean-Louis Borloo	31,622	63.07	
PCF	Fabien Thiémé	18,514	36.93	
Turnout		52,417	69.60	
DVD gain from PCF		Swing		

== Sources ==
- Official results of French elections from 1998: "Résultats électoraux officiels en France" (in French).
