= Gilles Le Gendre =

French politician (born 1958)

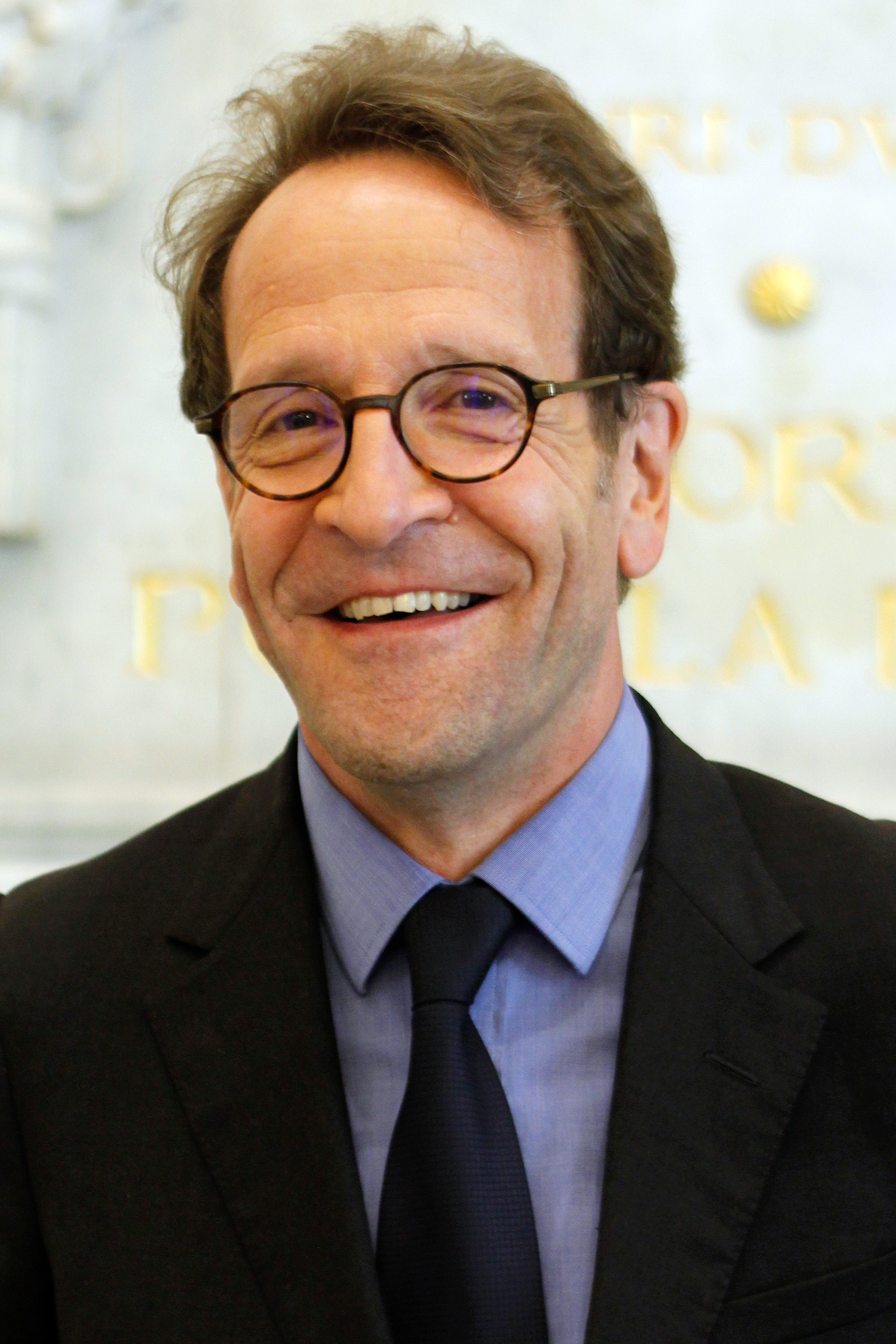
- Le Gendre in 2017

President of the La République En Marche group in the National Assembly
- In office 12 September 2018 – 10 September 2020
- Preceded by: Richard Ferrand
- Succeeded by: Christophe Castaner

Member of the National Assembly for Paris's 2nd constituency
- In office 21 June 2017 – 9 June 2024
- Preceded by: François Fillon
- Succeeded by: Jean Laussucq

Personal details
- Born: 13 May 1958 (age 68) Neuilly-sur-Seine, France
- Party: Renaissance
- Education: Lycée Pasteur
- Alma mater: Sciences Po

Gilles Le Gendre (French pronunciation: [ʒil lə ʒɑ̃dʁ]; born 13 May 1958) is a French politician who presided over the La République En Marche group in the National Assembly from 2018 to 2020. He was elected to the National Assembly in the 2017 legislative election for the 2nd constituency of Paris, which encompasses the 5th, as well as parts of the 6th and 7th arrondissements. He lost his party's renomination ahead of the 2024 snap election, in which he unsuccessfully ran for a third term in office.

== Early career ==
A graduate of Sciences Po, Le Gendre worked as director of the Challenges magazine redaction from 1995 to 2001 after stints at Europe 1 and Le Nouvel Économiste. He was director of communications and member of the executive committee at Fnac from 2002 to 2004.

== Political career ==
In Parliament, Le Gendre served as a member of the Committee on National Defence and the Armed Forces. He was elected president of the LREM group in the National Assembly after the election of Richard Ferrand as the body's president.

In July 2019, Le Gendre voted in favour of the French ratification of the European Union's Comprehensive Economic and Trade Agreement (CETA) with Canada. He stepped down in 2020 as group president and was succeeded by former Interior Minister Christophe Castaner.

Reelected in 2022, he was not nominated by Renaissance (formerly LREM) for a third term in the National Assembly. Instead, the Ensemble coalition nominated Jean Laussucq, who won the seat in the 2024 snap election. Le Gendre placed third in the first voting round, withdrawing for the second, allowing Laussucq to win the seat against Marine Rosset of the Socialist Party, who had placed first in the first round.

== Other activities ==
- Caisse des dépôts et consignations, Chair of the Supervisory Board (2017–2018)

== See also ==
- 2017 French legislative election
