= Paris's 2nd constituency =

Constituency of the National Assembly of France

2nd constituency of Paris
- inline Constituency of the National Assembly of France

- Paris, showing its post 2012 legislative constituencies
- Deputy: Michel Barnier; LR
- Department: Paris

2nd constituency of Paris
- inline Constituency of the National Assembly of France

- Paris, showing its legislative constituencies between 1988 and 2012
- Member: constituency abolished, 2012
- Department: Paris

Map of Paris constituencies in 1981.

The 2nd constituency of Paris (French: Deuxième circonscription de Paris) is a French legislative constituency in the department of Paris. Like the other 576 French constituencies, it elects one member of the National Assembly using the two-round system. Its boundaries were heavily redrawn in 1988 and 2012. From 1958 until 1988 it was located on the Rive Droite; since then it has been located on the Rive Gauche. In a by-election in 2025, former Prime Minister Michel Barnier was elected.

== Deputies ==
Election	Member	Party	Notes
1958	Michel Junot	CNIP	
1962	Jean Sainteny	UNR	
1963	Amédée Brousset	UNR	Substitute for Sainteny
1967	Jacques Dominati	RI	
1968	Jacques Dominati	RI	
1973	Jacques Dominati	RI	
1978	Jacques Dominati	UDF	
1978	Abel Thomas	UDF	Substitute for Dominati
1981	Pierre Dabezies	PS	Election nullified by the Constitutional Council
1982	Jacques Dominati	UDF	Won by-election
1986	Proportional representation – no election by constituency		
1988	Jean Tiberi	RPR	
1993	Jean Tiberi	RPR	
1997	Jean Tiberi	RPR	
2002	Jean Tiberi	UMP	
2007	Jean Tiberi	UMP	
2012	François Fillon	UMP	
2017	Gilles Le Gendre	LREM	
2022	Gilles Le Gendre	RE	
2024	Jean Laussucq	RE	Election nullified by the Constitutional Council
2025	Michel Barnier	LR	Won by-election

== Election results ==
=== 2024 ===
Candidate	Party	Alliance	First round			Second round		
Candidate	Party	Alliance	Votes	%	+/–	Votes	%	+/–
Marine Rosset	PS	NFP	18,845	33.40	+6.13	21,784	43.50	+6.89
Jean Laussucq	RE	ENS	13,325	23.62	-12.04	28,294	56.50	-6.89
Gilles Le Gendre	RE diss.		11,071	19.62	N/A	WITHDREW		
Melody de Witte	RN		6,206	11.00	+8.03			
Félicité Herzog de Cossé Brissac	DIV		3,792	6.72	N/A			
Romain Marsily	DVD		1,229	2.18	N/A			
Ornella Evangelista	REC		778	1.38	-5.10			
Cécile Marie Lorans	DVE		512	0.91	N/A			
Frédéric Mauriange	ÉAC		430	0.76	N/A			
Charline Joliveau	LO		168	0.30	-0.03			
Elise Magne	Volt		60	0.11	-1.15			
Clara Sacasa	EXG		0	0.00	N/A			
Valid votes			56,418	99.14	+0.23	50,078	95.73	+1.01
Blank votes			337	0.59	-0.20	1,656	3.17	-0.70
Null votes			153	0.27	-0.03	575	1.10	-0.31
Turnout			56,908	76.31	+17.36	52,309	70.14	+13.41
Abstentions			17,671	23.69	-17.36	22,270	29.86	-13.41
Registered voters			74,579			74,579		
Source: Ministry of the Interior, Le Monde
Result						RE HOLD		

=== 2022 ===
Legislative Election 2022: Paris's 2nd constituency
Party	Candidate	Votes	%	±%
LREM (Ensemble)	Gilles Le Gendre	15,547	35.66	-6.15
PS (NUPÉS)	Marine Rosset	11,890	27.27	+10.48
LR (UDC)	Jean-Pierre Lecoq	7,948	18.23	+0.10
REC	Isabelle Gilbert	2,827	6.48	N/A
DIV	Quitterie de Villepin	2,362	5.42	N/A
RN	André Rougé	1,294	2.97	+0.66
Others	N/A	1,728		
Turnout		44,078	58.95	−3.14
2nd round result
LREM (Ensemble)	Gilles Le Gendre	25,471	63.39	+8.86
PS (NUPÉS)	Marine Rosset	14,710	36.61	N/A
Turnout		40,181	56.74	+5.21
LREM hold				

=== 2017 ===
2017 legislative election: Paris's 2nd constituency
Party	Candidate	Votes	%	±%
LREM	Gilles Le Gendre	18,463	41.81	N/A
LR	Nathalie Kosciusko-Morizet	8,007	18.13	−30.49
DVD	Jean-Pierre Lecoq	4,050	9.17	N/A
PS	Marine Rosset	2,700	6.11	−15.44
LFI	Anne-Françoise Prunieres	2,632	5.96	N/A
EELV	Gilles Seignan	2,086	4.72	+0.58
DVD	Henri Guaino	1,991	4.51	N/A
FN	Manon Bouquin	1,021	2.31	−1.62
Others	N/A	3,209		
Turnout		44,545	62.09	−1.54
2nd round result
LREM	Gilles Le Gendre	18,347	54.53	N/A
LR	Nathalie Kosciusko-Morizet	15,298	45.47	−10.99
Turnout		36,963	51.53	−8.13
LREM gain from LR		Swing		

=== 2012 ===
2012 legislative election in Paris's 2nd constituency
Candidate	Party	First round		Second round	
Candidate	Party	Votes	%	Votes	%
François Fillon	UMP	22,028	48.62%	23,976	56.46%
Axel Kahn	PS	15,348	33.88%	18,489	43.54%
Laurent Audouin	EELV	1,875	4.14%		
Marc Le Tanneur	FN	1,782	3.93%		
Amar Bellal	FG	1,589	3.51%		
Anne-Sophie Godfroy-Genin	MoDem	1,213	2.68%		
Véronique Bover Sayous	PP	369	0.81%		
Alix Fourier	PCD	338	0.75%		
Chantal Cottet	RIC	154	0.34%		
Guillaume Lance	DLR	148	0.33%		
Christophe Darmangeat	LO	112	0.25%		
Stella Rebot	DVD (PDL)	101	0.22%		
Gilles Moisan De Kerbino	AR	99	0.22%		
Yvan Blot	RIF	76	0.17%		
Farid Debah	AEI	41	0.09%		
Nicolas Rousseaux	DVD	28	0.06%		
Clément Deflandre	DVG	2	0.00%		
Lassina Traore	SE	0	0.00%		
Valid votes		45,303	99.42%	42,465	98.50%
Spoilt and null votes		264	0.58%	647	1.50%
Votes cast / turnout		45,567	64.00%	43,112	60.57%
Abstentions		25,631	36.00%	28,067	39.43%
Registered voters		71,198	100.00%	71,179	100.00%

=== 2007 ===
Elections between 1988 and 2007 were based on the 1988 boundaries.

Map of Paris Constituencies, 1988-2007 elections

2007 legislative election: Paris's 2nd constituency
Party	Candidate	Votes	%	±%
UMP	Jean Tiberi	15,585	43.30	
PS	Lyne Cohen-Solal	9,971	27.70	
MoDem	Christian Saint-Etienne	5,816	16.16	
LV	Laurent Audouin	1,323	3.68	
PCF	Marine Roussillon	770	2.14	
Others	N/A	2,529		
Turnout		36,354	67.83	
2nd round result
UMP	Jean Tiberi	16,880	52.66	
PS	Lyne Cohen-Solal	15,173	47.34	
Turnout		33,409	62.35	
UMP hold				

=== 2002 ===
2002 legislative election: Paris's 2nd constituency
Party	Candidate	Votes	%	±%
UMP	Jean Tiberi	16,109	42.87	
PS	Lyne Cohen-Solal	10,908	29.03	
LV	Aurélie Filippetti	2,462	6.55	
UDF	Anne-Sophie Godfroy-Genin	2,366	6.30	
FN	Isabelle Bardy	1,517	4.04	
Others	N/A	4,216		
Turnout		37,907	74.96	
2nd round result
UMP	Jean Tiberi	18,623	55.50	
PS	Lyne Cohen-Solal	14,933	44.50	
Turnout		34,857	68.93	
UMP hold				

=== 1997 ===
1997 legislative election: Paris's 2nd constituency
Party	Candidate	Votes	%	±%
RPR	Jean Tiberi	12,326	33.46	
PS	Lyne Cohen-Solal	10,293	27.94	
FN	Jacques Mary	2,629	7.14	
LV	Yves Frémion	1,811	4.92	
DIV	Jean-Jacques Walter	1,684	4.57	
PCF	Martine Farner	1,351	3.67	
DVD	Frédérique Pierre	1,261	3.42	
DVG	Corinne Barrière	898	2.44	
Others	N/A	4,581		
Turnout		38,005	65.67	
2nd round result
RPR	Jean Tiberi	20,675	53.53	
PS	Lyne Cohen-Solal	17,950	46.47	
Turnout		40,659	70.29	
RPR hold				
