= Jean-Louis Borloo =

French politician (born 1951)

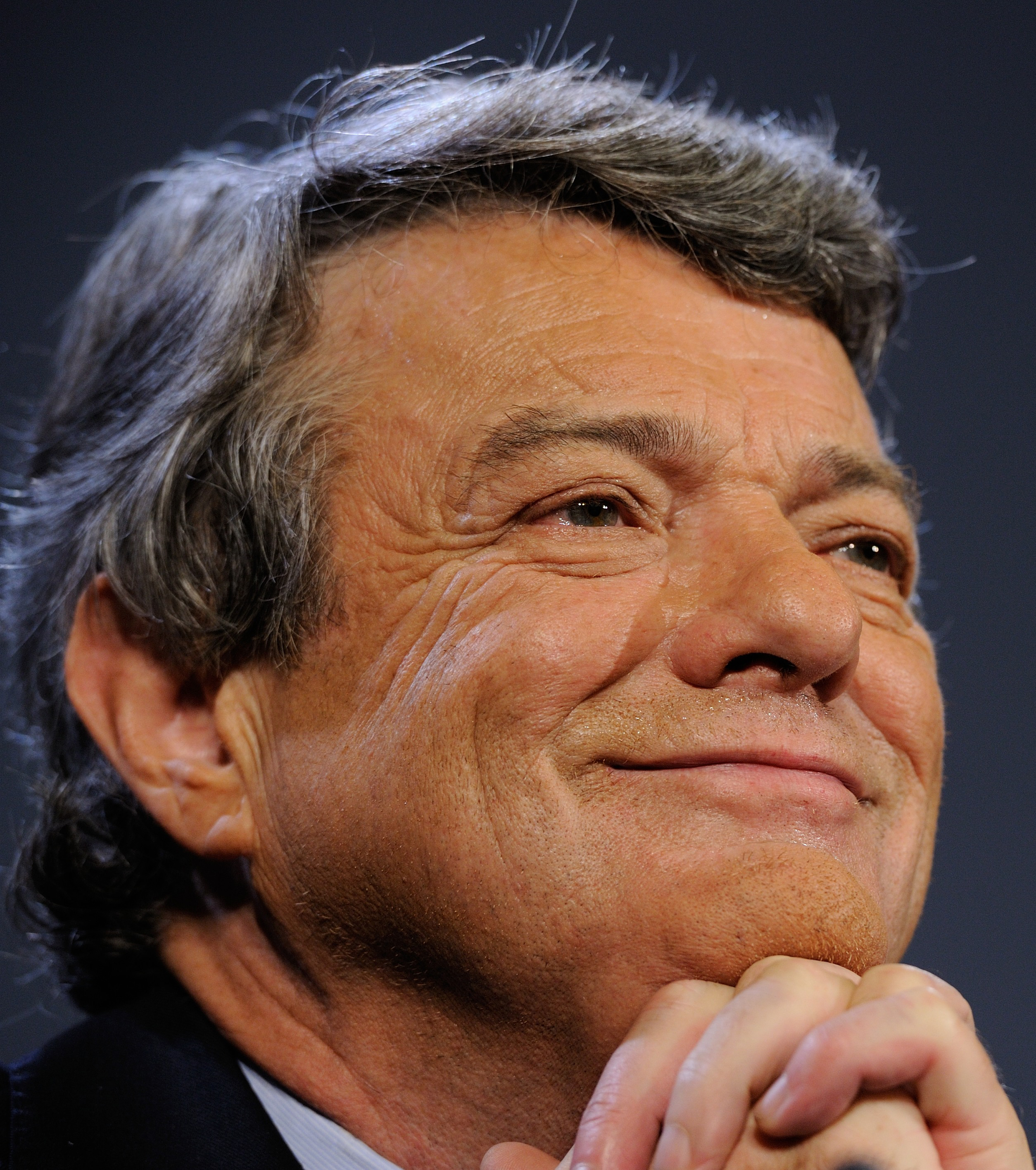
- Borloo in 2015

Minister of State, Minister of Ecology, Energy, Sustainable Development and the Sea (Note: Previously Minister of Ecology and Sustainable Development and Planning (2007–2008) and Minister of Ecology, Energy, Sustainable Development and Territorial Planning (2008–2009).)
- In office 19 June 2007 – 13 November 2010
- Prime Minister: François Fillon
- Preceded by: Alain Juppé
- Succeeded by: Nathalie Kosciusko-Morizet

Minister of the Economy, Finance and Employment
- In office 18 May 2007 – 19 June 2007
- Prime Minister: François Fillon
- Preceded by: Thierry Breton (Economy and Finance); Himself (Employment)
- Succeeded by: Christine Lagarde

Minister of Employment, Social Cohesion and Housing (Note: Minister of Labour, Employment and Social Cohesion until 31 May 2005. Took over the Housing portfolio from Minister Delegate for Housing and the City Marc-Philippe Daubresse.)
- In office 31 March 2004 – 15 May 2007
- Prime Minister: Jean-Pierre Raffarin; Dominique de Villepin
- Preceded by: François Fillon
- Succeeded by: Himself (Employment); Xavier Bertrand (Social Relations); Christine Boutin (Housing)

Minister Delegate for the City and Urban Renovation (Note: Minister Delegate for the City until 17 June 2002.)
- In office 7 May 2002 – 30 March 2004
- Prime Minister: Jean-Pierre Raffarin
- Preceded by: Claude Bartolone
- Succeeded by: Marc-Philippe Daubresse

Mayor of Valenciennes
- In office 24 March 1989 – 7 May 2002
- Preceded by: Olivier Marlière
- Succeeded by: Dominique Riquet
Parliamentary offices
President of the Union of Democrats and Independents in the National Assembly
In office 26 June 2012 – 14 April 2014
Preceded by	Position established
Succeeded by	Philippe Vigier
Member of the National Assembly for Nord's 21st constituency
In office 14 December 2010 – 30 April 2014
Preceded by	Cécile Gallez
Succeeded by	Laurent Degallaix
In office 2 April 1993 – 8 June 2002
Preceded by	Fabien Thiémé
Succeeded by	Cécile Gallez
Member of the European Parliament
In office 25 July 1989 – 4 September 1992
Constituency	France
Party offices
President of the Union of Democrats and Independents
In office 18 September 2012 – 6 April 2014
Preceded by	Position established
Succeeded by	Jean-Christophe Lagarde
President of the Radical Party
In office 11 December 2005 – 6 April 2014 Serving with André Rossinot (2005–2007)
Preceded by	André Rossinot
Succeeded by	Laurent Hénart

Personal details
- Born: Jean-Louis Marie Borloo; 7 April 1951 (age 75) Paris, France
- Party: UDI (2012–present)
- Other political affiliations: GÉ (1990–1991); UDF (1998–2002); UMP (2002–2011); PRV (2002–2017)
- Spouse: Béatrice Szabo Schönberg (m. 2005)
- Education: Lycée Janson-de-Sailly
- Alma mater: Panthéon-Sorbonne University; HEC Paris
- Occupation: Lawyer • Politician

Jean-Louis Marie Borloo (French pronunciation: [ʒɑ̃lwi maʁi bɔʁlo]; born 7 April 1951) is a French politician and lawyer who served as the inaugural president of the Union of Democrats and Independents (UDI) from 2012 to 2014. In government, he was Minister Delegate for the City and Urban Renewal from 2002 to 2004 and Minister of Employment, Social Cohesion and Housing from 2004 to 2007 under President Jacques Chirac, and Minister of the Economy, Finance and Employment in 2007 and Minister of Ecology, Energy, Sustainable Development and the Sea from 2007 until 2010 under President Nicolas Sarkozy.

== Early life ==
Jean-Louis Marie Borloo was born in Paris. His parents were Lucien Borloo, born in Guémené-sur-Scorff, Morbihan, of Breton and Belgian origin, and Mauricette Acquaviva from Marseille, of Corsican origin. Borloo gained his baccalauréat in 1969, in the philosophy stream.

In 1972 he took a first degree in Law and Philosophy at Panthéon-Sorbonne University, in 1974 a further degree in History and Economics at Paris X Nanterre, and in 1976 an MBA at HEC Paris. While a student, he worked at a filling station to pay his studies.

== Political career ==
Borloo began his career as a lawyer in the 1980s. He became president of the Valenciennes Football Club in 1986. In 1989, he was elected mayor of Valenciennes as an independent, winning over 76% of the second-round vote.

In the June 1989 European Parliament election, Borloo was elected to the European Parliament as the second candidate on Simone Veil's list. He held this seat until his election as regional councillor in Nord-Pas-de-Calais in 1992.

Borloo was elected to the National Assembly as a miscellaneous right candidate representing the 21st constituency of Nord in 1993. Joining the caucus of the UDF, he was re-elected in 1997, two years after his re-election as Mayor of Valenciennes.

He was a founding member of Ecology Generation in 1990, but he later joined the Union for French Democracy led by François Bayrou. However, in 2002 he joined the Radical Party, associated with the new Union for a Popular Movement (UMP). He was co-president of the Radical Party alongside André Rossinot between 2005 and 2007, when he became sole president of the party.

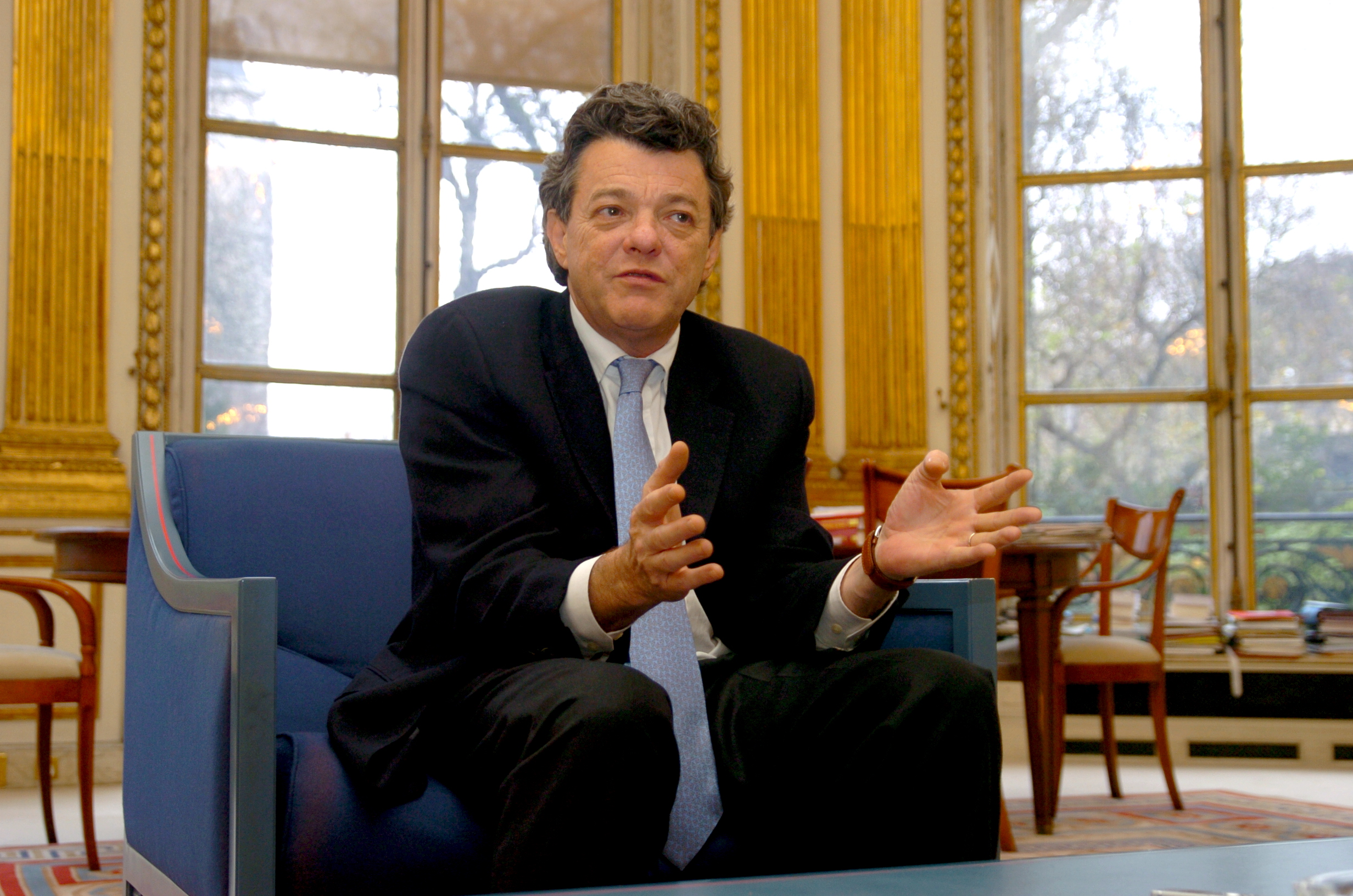
Borloo as Employment Minister in 2006

It was on the Radical-UMP ticket that Borloo was re-elected as a deputy in 2002 and 2007. He was Minister Delegate for the City and Urban Renovation in the Jean-Pierre Raffarin governments between 2002 and 2004, Minister of Labour, Employment and Social Cohesion under Raffarin between 2004 and 2005, and finally Minister of Employment, Social Cohesion and Housing in the Dominique de Villepin government between 2005 and 2007. In that role, he introduced a five-year plan of social cohesion, which was centered around three axes: equal opportunity, housing and employment.

On 21 July 2005 Borloo married news anchorwoman Béatrice Schönberg at Rueil-Malmaison, Hauts-de-Seine.

From 18 May to 19 June 2007, he was Minister of the Economy and Finance in the François Fillon cabinet. Between 19 June 2007 and November 2010, he was the French minister of State for Energy, Ecology and Sustainable Development. In this capacity, he was a major player in the 2007–2008 Grenelle de l'environnement. He quit the government allegedly after being passed over for premiership in a cabinet reshuffle.

In April 2011, Borloo left the UMP in protest at Sarkozy's rightward swing. He announced plans to set up a "republican, ecologist, and social alliance", with a view to becoming a candidate in the 2012 presidential election. However, he decided not to run for President of France.

In September 2012, he created the Union of Democrats and Independents (UDI), successor of The Alliance, trying to unify all the centrist parties, while the UDI still allied with the UMP.

Despite being a leader in the UDI, Borloo was not involved in the 2014 municipal elections, mentioning health reasons, such as frontal acute pneumonia and sepsis. On 6 April 2014, Borloo announced in a letter to the executives of the UDI that he would resign immediately from "every political term and position" due to his health concerns.

== Notes ==
Political offices
Preceded by François Fillon	Minister of Employment, Social Cohesion and Housing; 2004–2007	Succeeded by Xavier Bertrand
Preceded by Thierry Breton	Minister of the Economy, Finance and Employment; 2007	Succeeded by Christine Lagarde
Preceded by Alain Juppé	Minister of Ecology, Energy, Sustainable Development and the Sea; 2007–2010	Succeeded by Nathalie Kosciusko-Morizet
