= Jean Laussucq =

French politician (born 1990)

Member of the National Assembly for Paris's 2nd constituency
- In office 8 July 2024 – 11 July 2025
- Preceded by: Gilles Le Gendre
- Succeeded by: Michel Barnier

Councillor of Paris
- Incumbent
- Assumed office 28 June 2020
- Constituency: 7th arrondissement

Personal details
- Born: 4 February 1990 (age 36) Bayonne, France
- Party: RE (since 2024)
- Other political affiliations: LR (until 2024)
- Education: Sciences Po
- Occupation: Civil servant

Jean Laussucq (French pronunciation: [ʒɑ̃ losyk]; born 4 February 1990) is a French politician who was elected the deputy in the National Assembly for Paris's 2nd constituency in 2024. A former member of The Republicans (LR), he was the candidate of the Ensemble coalition, which did not renominate its outgoing deputy Gilles Le Gendre. He has also served as a Councillor of Paris for the 7th arrondissement since 2020. In July 2025, he was obliged to resign from his deputy seat due to irregular transactions making up 21% of his campaign expenditures.

== Early life and career ==
Laussucq was born in Bayonne in 1990. He worked as a parliamentary assistant in both the National Assembly and European Parliament.
