= Béatrice Descamps =

French politician

Béatrice Descamps (French pronunciation: [beatʁis dekɑ̃]; born 22 June 1951 in Valenciennes) is a French politician in the National Assembly and a former member of the Senate of France. She represented the Nord department and is a member of the Union of Democrats and Independents. She has been Member of Parliament for Nord's 21st constituency since 2017.

== Biography ==
Valérie Létard's appointment to the French government in July 2007 led to her entry into the Senate.

Valérie Létard came fourth on the RPR-UDF-DVD list led by Jean-René Lecerf in the 2001 senatorial elections, a list which won two seats. This appointment, combined with Marc-Philippe Daubresse's decision not to sit in the Palais du Luxembourg (given his re-election a month earlier to the National Assembly), led to her becoming a senator.

== Bibliography ==
- Page on the Senate website
- Page on the Assembly website
