= Arthur Moulin =

French politician

- Born: 4 July 1924; Saint-Aubin, Nord, France
- Died: 9 May 2017 (aged 92)

Arthur Moulin (French pronunciation: [aʁtyʁ mulɛ̃]; 4 July 1924 – 9 May 2017) was a French politician. He joined the French Resistance during World War II. He served as a member of the National Assembly from 1958 to 1973, representing Nord. He also served as a member of the French Senate from 1983 to 1992, representing Nord. He was the mayor of Avesnes in Pas-de-Calais from 1971 to 1989.
