= Post-Brexit United Kingdom relations with the European Union =

United Kingdom–European Union relations

- European Union: United Kingdom

Diplomatic mission
- European Union Delegation, London: United Kingdom Mission, Brussels

Envoy
- Ambassador João Vale de Almeida: Ambassador Lindsay Croisdale-Appleby

The United Kingdom's post-Brexit relationship with the European Union and its members is governed by the Brexit withdrawal agreement and the EU–UK Trade and Cooperation Agreement. The latter was negotiated in 2020 and has applied since January 2021.

Following the UK's withdrawal from the EU on 31 January 2020, (Note: GMT, 1 February CET) the UK continued to conform to EU regulations and to participate in the EU Customs Union during the "Brexit transition period", which began on 1 February 2020 and ended on 31 December 2020. This allowed for a period of time to negotiate a bilateral trade agreement between the UK and the EU.

== Developments ==
=== Timeline ===
- 23 January 2023: Shadow Foreign Secretary David Lammy, in a speech at Chatham House, says that if elected the next Labour government would use the next scheduled review of the 2021 Trade and Cooperation Agreement to increase cooperation with the EU.
- 11 February 2023: Reports emerge of a secret cross-party meeting of senior current and former politicians from the Conservative Party, including Cabinet Minister Michael Gove, and the Labour Party to address failures within the UK-EU relationship under the Trade and Cooperation Agreement.
- 27 February 2023: UK Foreign Secretary James Cleverly and European Commission Vice-President Maroš Šefčovič agree and sign the Windsor Framework to resolve issues on the implementation of the Northern Ireland Protocol.
- 19 May 2025: The UK and EU discuss food and metal exports, travel, fishing access, and border security. Agreements include reductions in checks on export to the EU of food, animals and plants; a formal UK-EU defence and security pact; the UK's commitment to join PESCO; and the future reopening of e-gates at airports to UK citizens. At the same time, the EU's existing access to UK fishing waters is extended until 2038, subject to agreed yearly catch quotas.

=== Opinion polling in the United Kingdom ===
Since May 2022, opinion polling has shown a steady increase in the numbers of Britons seeking to rejoin the European Union, with the number polled opting to stay outside the EU declining.

In November 2022, 53% of Brits polled would opt to re-join the EU if another referendum were held, with 34% opting to stay out (14% unsure).

== Trade ==
The UK has decided to withdraw from the single market, the customs union. Furthermore, for all international agreements the EU entered into, the EU participation does not include the UK since 1 January 2021.

Those definitive changes could create difficulties which might be under-estimated, according to Michel Barnier:

- re-introduction of customs formalities, as was the case before UK membership, for every product imported and exported to and from the EU and the UK
- end of financial passporting rights for the UK services sector
- end of Community preference to all goods, trade and people from the UK in EU member states
- UK product certification will no longer be recognized within the EU
- imposition of non-tariff barriers to trade, such as the possibility of lengthy delays at the border, import quotas and immigration restrictions resulting from the loss of EU citizenship for UK workers

Post-Brexit negotiations have tried to create an ambitious pact between the UK and the EU to avoid disruption as much as possible, according to Michel Barnier.

=== UK membership of the European Economic Area ===
The UK could have sought to continue to be a member of the European Economic Area, perhaps as a member of EFTA. In January 2017, Theresa May, the British Prime Minister, announced a 12-point plan of negotiating objectives and said that the UK government would not seek continued membership in the single market.

=== WTO option ===
The no-deal WTO option would involve the United Kingdom ending the transition period without any trade agreement and relying on the most favoured nation trading rules set by the World Trade Organization. The Confederation of British Industry said such a plan would be a "sledgehammer for our economy", and the National Farmer's Union was also highly critical. Positive forecasting for the effects of a WTO Brexit for the UK cite other countries' existing WTO trade with the EU and the benefits of repossessing full fishing rights for a maritime island nation.

== People ==
=== Immigration ===
The EEA Agreement and the agreement with Switzerland cover free movement of goods, and free movement of people. Many supporters of Brexit want to restrict freedom of movement; the Prime Minister ruled out any continuation of free movement in January 2017.

In 2023, the French government proposed legislation allowing British people who own a home in France to stay there without limit, but the Constitutional Court rejected it as unconstitutional. Therefore, like other visa-free nationals, they can stay in France for a maximum of 90 days per 180-day period, unless they get a residence permit.

Of the 1,218,000 immigrants who came to the United Kingdom in 2023, only 126,000 were EU nationals. BBC reported that "In the 12 months to June 2023, net EU migration was −86,000, meaning more EU nationals left the UK than arrived". EU citizens working in the health and social care sector have been replaced by migrants from non-EU countries such as India and Nigeria. After Brexit, the number of EU nationals who were refused entry to the UK increased fivefold.

== Legal issues ==
Following Brexit, decisions of the European Court of Justice and other EU legal mechanisms still apply to and within the UK. For four years after the Brexit transition period, according to Article 87 of the withdrawal agreement, the European Commission can bring infringement actions against the UK for non-compliance. In addition, Article 158 of the withdrawal agreement permits UK courts hearing disputes regarding the rights of EU citizens residing in the UK, as outlined in Part Two of the withdrawal agreement, to submit preliminary references to the ECJ. Preliminary rulings from this procedure would have full legal weight in the UK, just as any other preliminary ruling would in an EU member state.

A prominent example of a post-Brexit case involving the UK at the ECJ was an infringement action brought by the Commission (Commission v United Kingdom, Case C-516/22). The Commission sought to overturn a UK Supreme Court ruling in the case Micula v Romania. Ioan and Viorel Micula were two Swedish investors who invested in Romania before the country joined the EU. As part of an investment attraction scheme, investors like the Miculas were promised incentives. However, once Romania joined the European Union, these state incentives were deemed contrary to EU law. The Miculas sought compensation under the ICSID Convention, as Romania reneged on the payout of these incentives. They sued simultaneously in EU member states and the UK. In 2014, the Commission issued a decision (C(2014) 3192), which deemed this type of compensation contrary to EU law. In February 2020, however, the UK Supreme Court found that the Miculas were entitled to compensation. However, the UK Supreme Court did not send a preliminary reference to the ECJ to decide on the compatibility of their ruling with EU law as this case was also pending within the EU legal system. The failure of the UK Supreme Court to submit a preliminary reference prompted the Commission to sue the UK for an infringement action. In March 2024, the ECJ ruled that the UK had "failed to fulfill its obligation" as a member state when awarding compensation in this case. Although this decision is binding according to Article 89 of the withdrawal agreement, it remains to be seen how and if the UK will comply with this decision, especially considering the contemporary hostile attitude towards the ECJ within British politics.

== Science and technology ==
=== Scientific research ===
The UK and EU came to an agreement in September 2023 for the United Kingdom to rejoin the European Union's funding programme for scientific research, Horizon Europe.

== Northern Ireland ==
One aspect of the final withdrawal agreement is the specific or unique status of Northern Ireland. The Northern Ireland Protocol that is part of the agreement provides (inter alia)

- Northern Ireland remains legally in the UK Customs Territory, and can be part of any future UK trade deals, as long as it is consistent with the Protocol. This results in a de jure customs border on the island of Ireland, between Northern Ireland and the Republic of Ireland.
- Great Britain is no longer in a customs union with the European Union. Northern Ireland is also no longer legally in the EU Customs Union, but remains an entry point into it, creating a de facto customs border down the Irish Sea.
- Level playing field provisions applying to Great Britain have been moved to the non-binding Political Declaration, although they are still present for Northern Ireland within the protocol.
- The UK needs to follow — in respect of Northern Ireland — EU regulations with regards to trade in goods and to implement future changes of those regulations;
- The Court of Justice has jurisdiction with regards to non-compliance of the UK with parts of the protocol as well as with the application of the trade in goods-regulation. Regarding the application of these rules courts can (and sometimes must) in regards to Northern Ireland make preliminary reference to the CJEU.
- EU tariffs (which ones are dependent on a UK–EU trade agreement), collected by the UK on behalf of the EU, would be levied on the goods going from Great Britain to Northern Ireland that would be "at risk" of then being transported into and sold in the Republic of Ireland; if they ultimately are not, then firms in Northern Ireland could claim rebates on goods where the UK had lower tariffs than the EU. A joint EU–UK committee will decide which goods are deemed "at risk".
- A unilateral exit mechanism by which Northern Ireland can leave the protocol: the Northern Ireland Assembly will vote every four years on whether to continue with these arrangements, for which a simple majority is required. If the assembly is suspended at the time, arrangements will be made so that the members of the legislative assembly can vote. If the Assembly expresses cross-community support in one of these periodic votes, then the protocol will apply for the next eight years instead of the usual four. If the Assembly votes against continuing with these arrangements, then there will be a two-year period for the UK and EU to agree to new arrangements, with recommendations made by a joint UK–EU committee. Rather than being a fallback position like the backstop was intended to be, this new protocol has been the initial position of Northern Ireland fsince the transition period ended in December 2020. Assembly members voted 48 to 36 in favour of extending the protocol for four further years on 10 December 2024. The vote did not reflect cross-community support.

According to Michel Barnier, this might raise issues for Northern Irish companies which need the UK to deliver clarity on this topic.

A joint EU–UK committee, headed by Michael Gove, Minister for the Cabinet Office, and Maroš Šefčovič, a Vice-President of the European Commission, oversees the operation of the arrangement.

== See also ==
- United Kingdom–European Union relations
- Membership of United Kingdom in the European Economic Area
- Potential re-accession of the United Kingdom to the European Union
