= Saint-Saulve =

- Commune
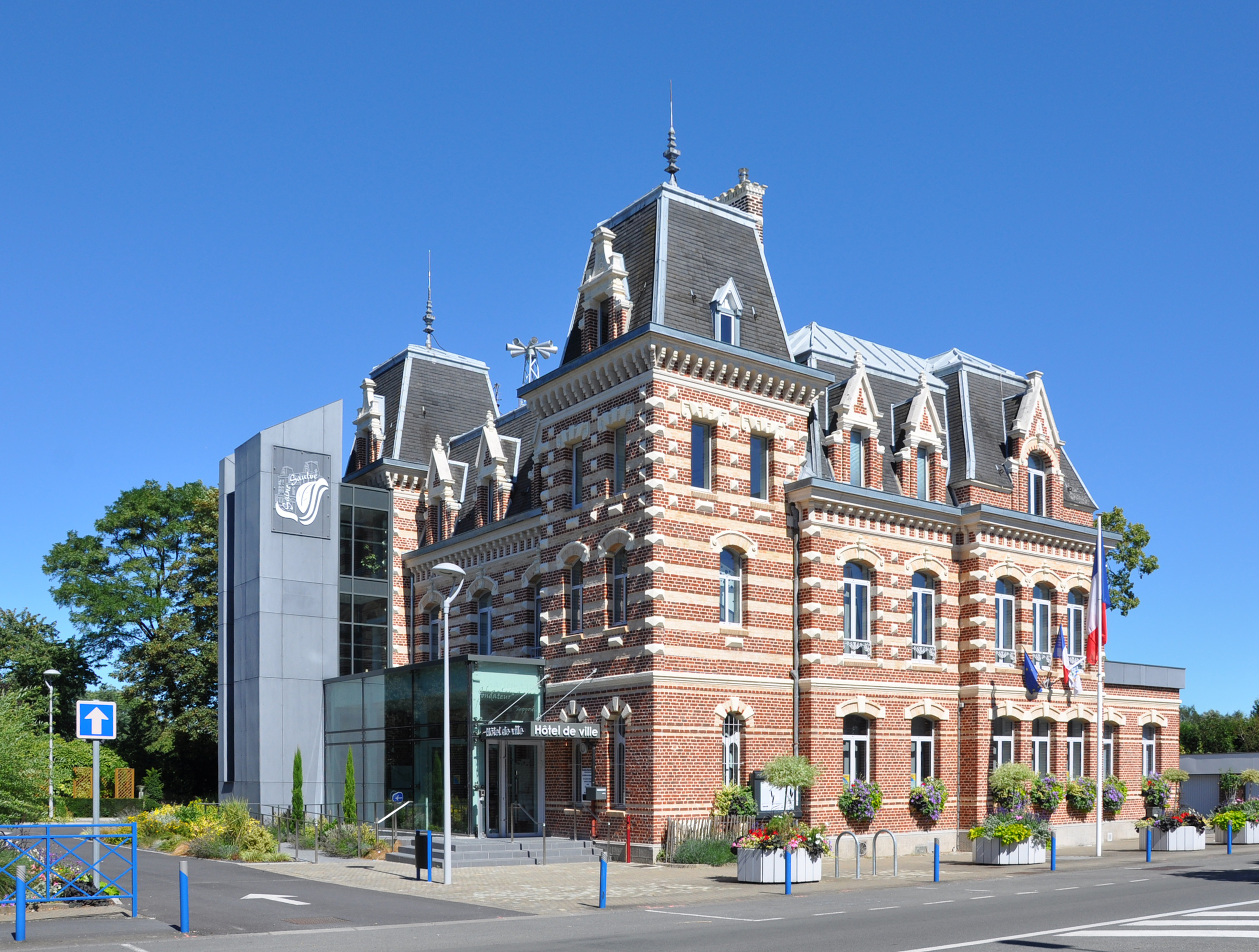
- The town hall in Saint-Saulve

- Coat of arms
- Location of Saint-Saulve
- Location within France Location within Hauts-de-France
- Coordinates: 50°22′12″N 3°33′18″E
- Country: France
- Region: Hauts-de-France
- Department: Nord
- Arrondissement: Valenciennes
- Canton: Valenciennes
- Intercommunality: CA Valenciennes Métropole

Government
  - Mayor (2020–2026): Yves Dusart
- Area^{1}: 12.04 km^{2} (4.65 sq mi)
- Elevation: 20 m (66 ft)
- Highest elevation: 95 m (312 ft)
- Lowest elevation: 15 m (49 ft)
- Population (2023): 10,947
  - Density: 909.2/km^{2} (2,355/sq mi)
- Time zone: UTC+01:00 (CET)
  - Summer (DST): UTC+02:00 (CEST)
- INSEE/Postal code: 59544 /59880
- ^{1} French Land Register data, which excludes lakes, ponds, glaciers > 1 km^{2} (0.386 sq mi or 247 acres) and river estuaries.

Saint-Saulve (French pronunciation: [sɛ̃ solv]) is a commune in the Nord department in northern France.

The town is named after Saint Salvius of Amiens (died c. 615), a bishop of Amiens.

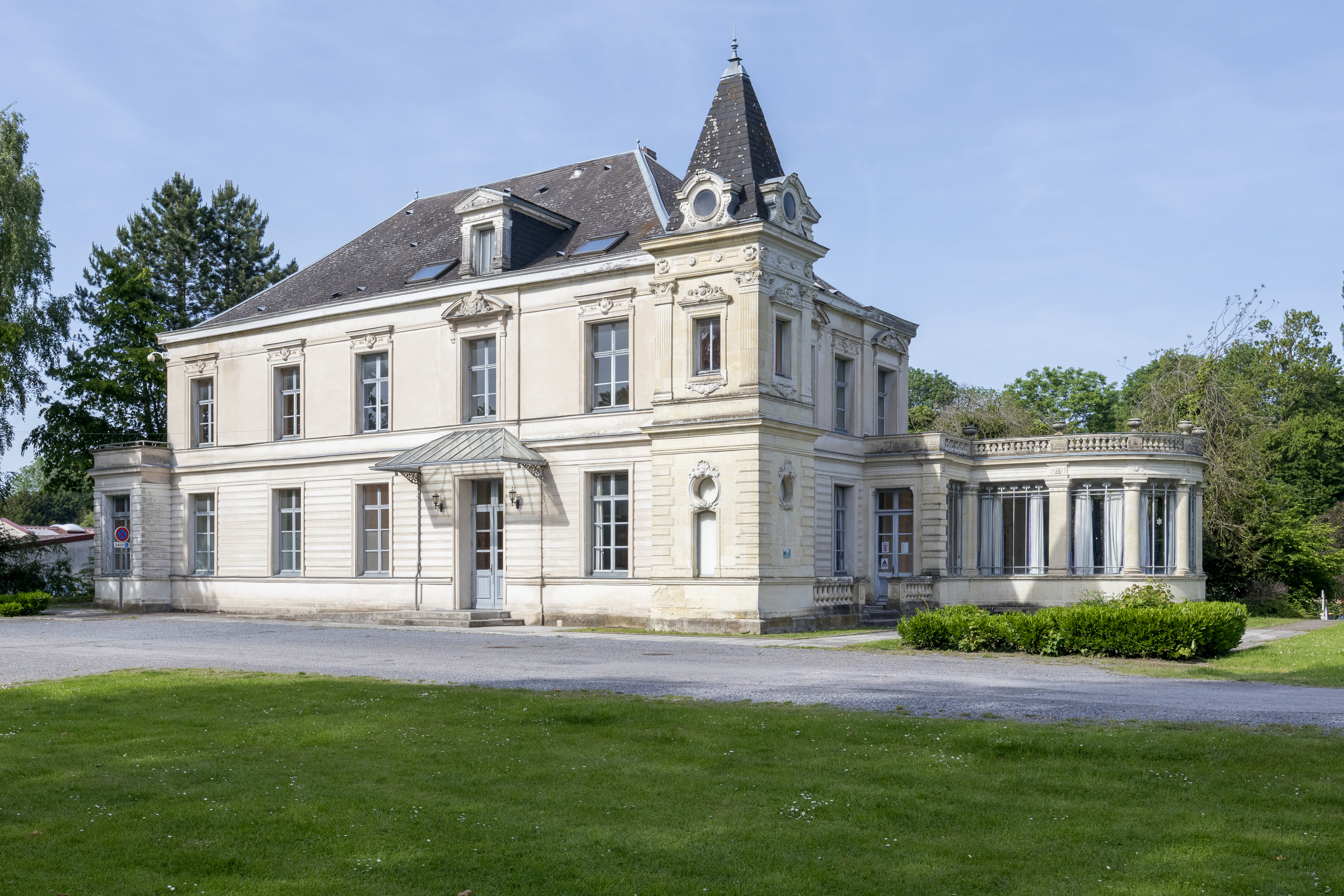
Fortier Castle

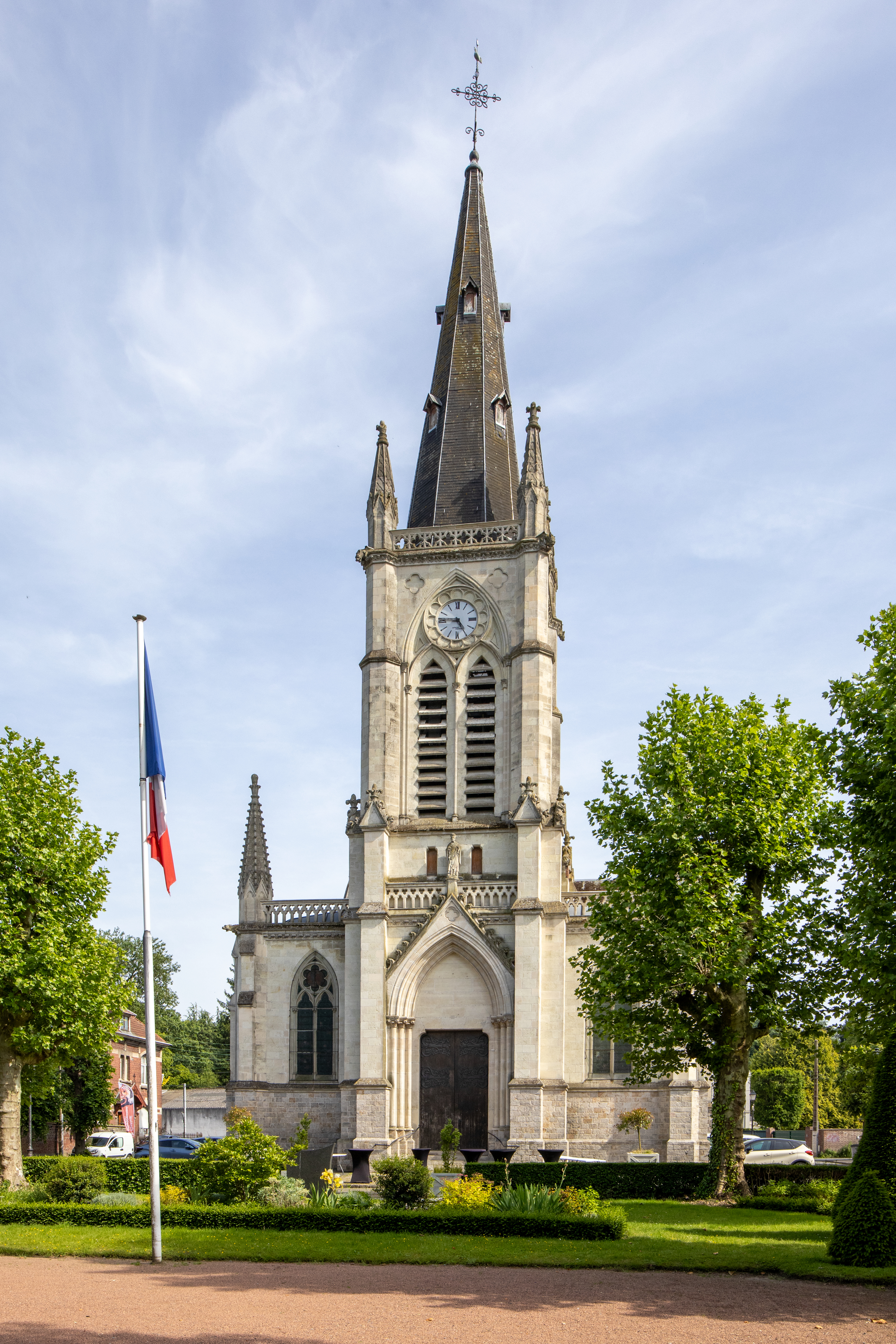
Saint-Martin Church

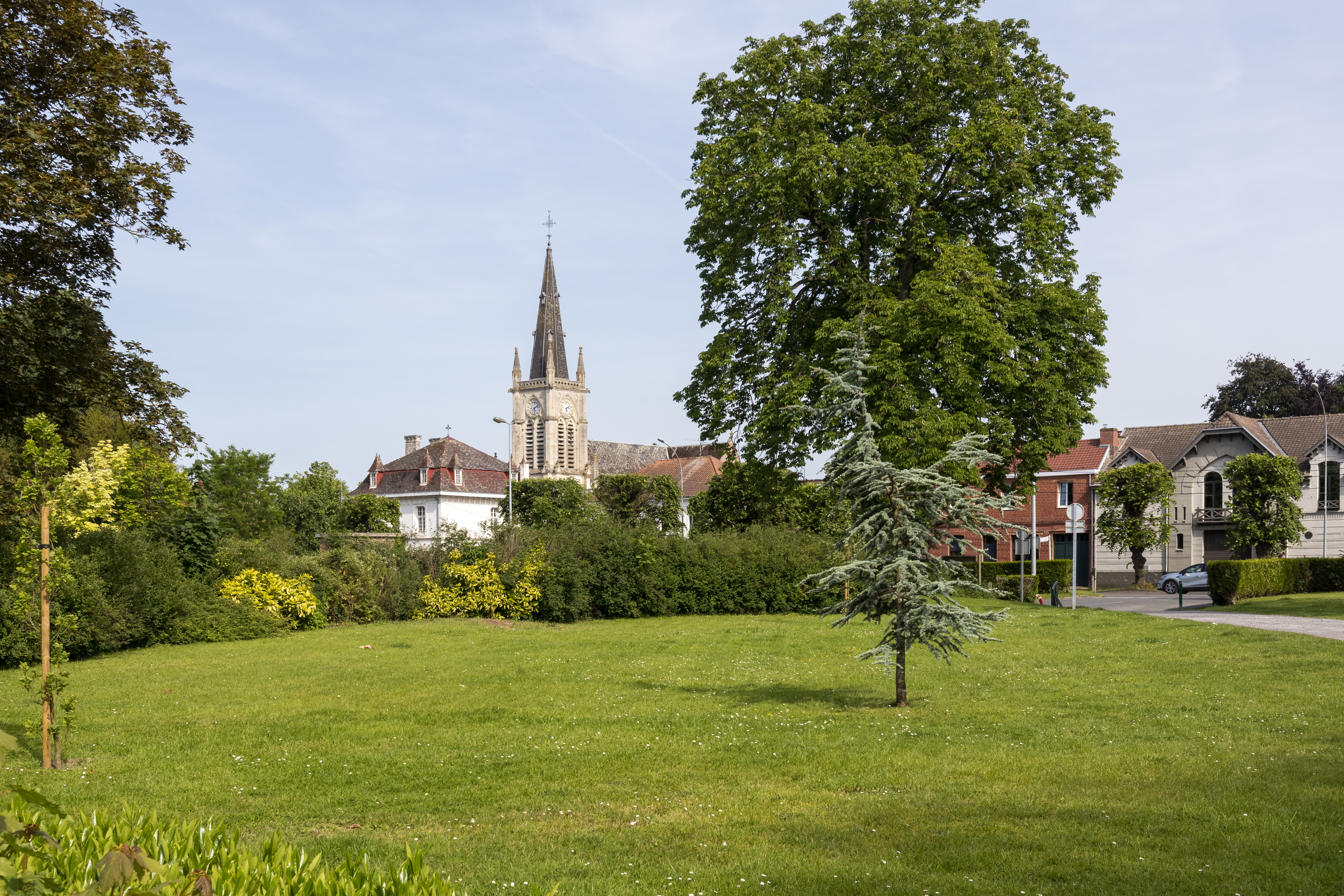

== Population ==
Historical population
Year	Pop.	±% p.a.
1968	7,007	—
1975	8,766	+3.25%
1982	10,717	+2.91%
1990	11,122	+0.46%
1999	11,033	−0.09%
2007	10,845	−0.21%
2012	11,062	+0.40%
2017	11,207	+0.26%
2023	10,947	−0.39%
Source: INSEE

== Heraldry ==
Arms of Saint-Saulve	The arms of Saint-Saulve are blazoned : Or, an eagle sable dimidiated with Azure semy de lys Or. The latter being France Ancient (Dechy, Férin and Saint-Saulve use the same arms.)

== See also ==
- Communes of the Nord department
