= Michel Barnier =

Prime Minister of France in 2024

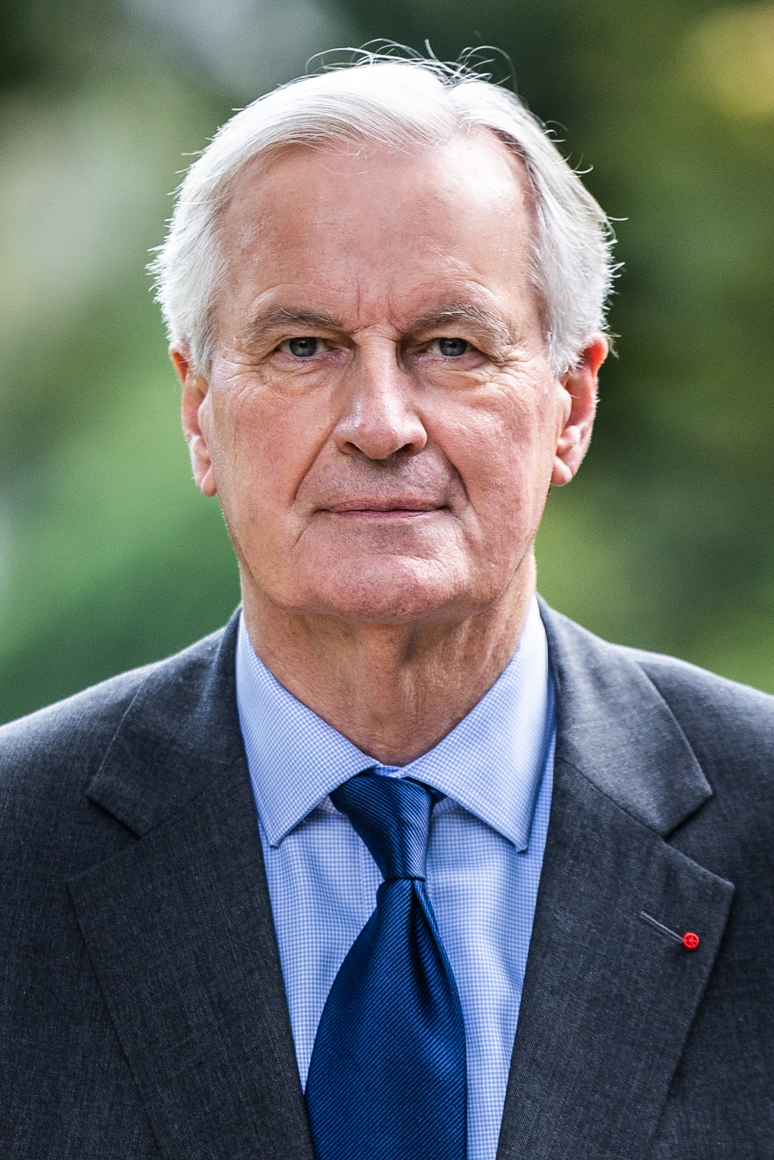
- Official portrait, 2024

Prime Minister of France
- In office 5 September 2024 – 13 December 2024
- President: Emmanuel Macron
- Preceded by: Gabriel Attal
- Succeeded by: François Bayrou

Member of the National Assembly for Paris's 2nd constituency
- Incumbent
- Assumed office 29 September 2025
- Preceded by: Jean Laussucq
EU political offices
Head of the UK Task Force
In office 16 November 2019 – 31 March 2021
President	Jean-Claude Juncker; Ursula von der Leyen
Deputy	Clara Martínez Alberola
Preceded by	Position established
Succeeded by	João Vale de Almeida (as Ambassador to the United Kingdom)
Chief Negotiator of Task Force 50
In office 1 October 2016 – 15 November 2019
President	Jean-Claude Juncker
Deputy	Sabine Weyand
Preceded by	Position established
Succeeded by	Position abolished
European Commissioner for Internal Market and Services
In office 10 February 2010 – 31 October 2014
President	José Manuel Barroso
Preceded by	Charlie McCreevy
Succeeded by	Elżbieta Bieńkowska
European Commissioner for Regional Policy
In office 16 September 1999 – 31 March 2004
President	Romano Prodi
Preceded by	Monika Wulf-Mathies
Succeeded by	Jacques Barrot
Member of the European Parliament for Île-de-France
In office 14 July 2009 – 10 February 2010
Succeeded by	Constance Le Grip
French political offices
Minister of Agriculture and Fisheries
In office 19 June 2007 – 22 June 2009
Prime Minister	François Fillon
Preceded by	Christine Lagarde
Succeeded by	Bruno Le Maire
Minister of Foreign Affairs
In office 31 March 2004 – 31 May 2005
Prime Minister	Jean-Pierre Raffarin
Preceded by	Dominique de Villepin
Succeeded by	Philippe Douste-Blazy
Minister Delegate for European Affairs
In office 18 May 1995 – 3 June 1997
Prime Minister	Alain Juppé
Preceded by	Alain Lamassoure
Succeeded by	Pierre Moscovici
Minister of the Environment
In office 29 March 1993 – 18 March 1995
Prime Minister	Édouard Balladur
Preceded by	Ségolène Royal
Succeeded by	Corinne Lepage
Senator for Savoie
In office 22 September 1997 – 23 September 1999
In office 2 October 1995 – 31 October 1995
Member of the National Assembly for Savoie
In office 3 April 1978 – 1 May 1993
Preceded by	Maurice Blanc
Succeeded by	Hervé Gaymard
Constituency	2nd (1978–1986); At-large (1986–1988); 2nd (1988–1993)
President of the General Council of Savoie
In office 14 March 1982 – 13 September 1999
Preceded by	Louis Besson
Succeeded by	Hervé Gaymard
General councillor of Savoie for the canton of Bourg-Saint-Maurice
In office 5 September 1973 – 13 September 1999
Preceded by	Alexis Borrel
Succeeded by	Jacqueline Poletti

Personal details
- Born: Michel Jean Barnier; 9 January 1951 (age 75) La Tronche, France
- Party: LR (2015–present)
- Other political affiliations: UDR (1967–1976); RPR (1976–2002); UMP (2002–2015)
- Spouse: Isabelle Altmayer (m. 1982)
- Children: 3
- Relatives: Éric and Nicolas Altmayer (brothers-in-law); René Altmayer (grandfather-in-law); Victor Joseph Altmayer (great-grandfather-in-law)
- Education: ESCP Business School
- Occupation: Diplomat; Politician

Michel Jean Barnier (French: [miʃɛl baʁnje]; born 9 January 1951) is a French politician who was Prime Minister of France from September to December 2024. A member of a series of successive neo-Gaullist parties (UDR, RPR, UMP, LR), Barnier served in several French government positions under prime ministers from Édouard Balladur to François Fillon from 1993 to 2009. At the European Union (EU) level, Barnier was Commissioner for Regional Policy from 1999 to 2004, Commissioner for Internal Market and Services from 2010 to 2014 and vice-president of the European People's Party (EPP) from 2010 to 2015. From 2016 to 2021, he was the EU's chief negotiator on Britain's exit from the EU.

In August 2021, Barnier sought his party's nomination for President of France in the 2022 presidential election, but obtained third place at the 2021 The Republicans congress. In September 2024 President Emmanuel Macron appointed him to the premiership following the 2024 snap legislative election.

At the age of 73, Barnier was the oldest person to take office as prime minister under the Fifth Republic, succeeding Gabriel Attal, who was the youngest at 34. On 4 December 2024, three months into his tenure, his government was brought down by a vote of no confidence in Parliament. The following day, Barnier and his government resigned. Barnier was succeeded on 13 December by François Bayrou. His tenure as prime minister was the shortest under the Fifth Republic. In September 2025, he was elected to the National Assembly to represent Paris's 2nd constituency.

Barnier is a pro-European, Gaullist conservative. He has advocated for stricter controls on non-European immigration, expanding prison capacity and the introduction of mandatory minimum sentences for certain crimes.

== Early life and education ==
Michel Jean Barnier was born at La Tronche in the French Alps, into a Gaullist family in 1951. His father, Jean Barnier, was a leather and textiles craftsman. His mother, Denise Durand, was a practising member of the Christian left, who founded a local chapter of the Ligue contre la violence routière (League against road violence). Barnier is the youngest of the couple's three sons.

In his youth, Barnier was a scout and choirboy. He graduated from the École Supérieure de Commerce de Paris (ESCP) in 1972. During his studies at the ESCP, he was a classmate of Jean-Pierre Raffarin, future prime minister, and a member of the Conférence Olivaint, a student organisation intended to prepare members for political life.

== Political career ==
=== National politics ===
Barnier served on the staff of various Gaullist ministers in the 1970s, before being elected in 1978, aged 27, to the National Assembly as deputy for the department of Savoie representing the neo-Gaullists, Rally for the Republic (RPR), serving until 1993. In the 1980s, he voted for the abolition of capital punishment and against reducing the age of consent for same-sex relationships to that of mixed-sex couples.

Barnier became the youngest president of the departmental council of Savoie in 1982, following a deal called the Union for Savoie between right-wing and centrist parties in the council. In 1992, he co-organised the Winter Olympics in Albertville.

Barnier first joined the government as Minister of the Environment following the right's landslide victory in the 1993 legislative election. In 1995, Jacques Chirac appointed him Minister for European Affairs, a role in which he served until the defeat of the presidential majority in the 1997 legislative election. Barnier then served as a European Commissioner for Regional Policy in the Prodi Commission from 1999 until 2004. He subsequently served as Foreign Minister in Jean-Pierre Raffarin's government until June 2005 when Dominique de Villepin replaced him with Philippe Douste-Blazy. From 2006 until 2015, Barnier was vice-president of the European People's Party. In 2007, under Nicolas Sarkozy's presidency, he re-joined the government as Minister of Agriculture.

In 2016, the investigating judge Sabine Kheris requested that the case of Barnier, Dominique de Villepin and Michèle Alliot-Marie be referred to the Court of Justice of the Republic. The former ministers were suspected of having allowed the exfiltration of the mercenaries responsible for the attack on the Bouaké penal camp during the 2004 Ivory Coast conflict, killing nine French soldiers. Supporters of the Ivorian president Laurent Gbagbo accused the French government of using the attack as a pretext for military retaliation against him.

=== European politics ===
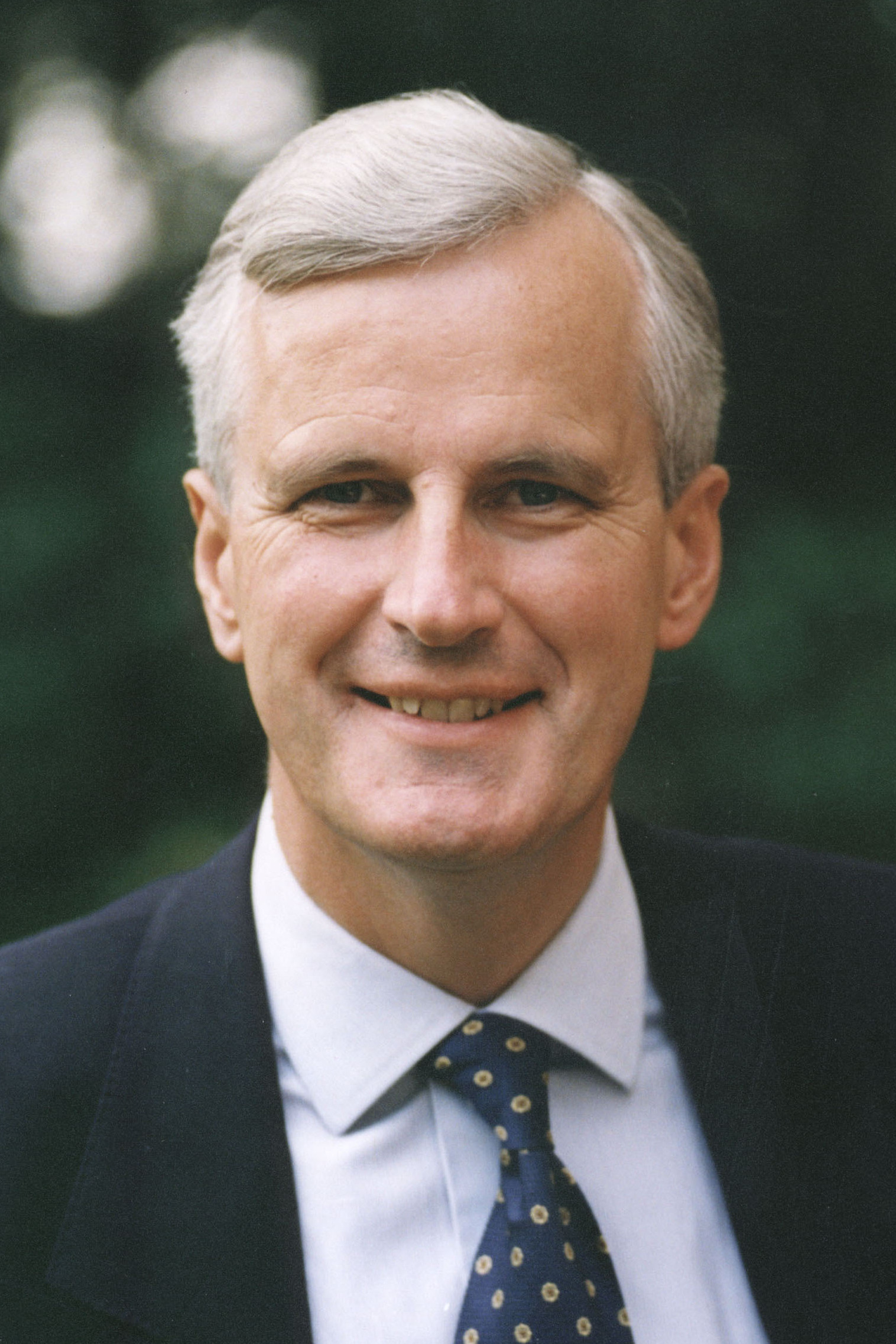
Official portrait of Barnier as EU Commissioner, 1999

Barnier worked in 2006 as a special adviser to José Manuel Barroso, then President of the European Commission, and presented a report to the Council of Ministers proposing the creation of a European civil-protection force. During 2006–2007, he served as member of the Amato Group, a group of high-level European politicians unofficially working on rewriting the Treaty establishing a Constitution for Europe into what became known as the Treaty of Lisbon following its rejection by French and Dutch voters.

Barnier led the UMP list in Ile-de-France for the 2009 European Parliament election. In February 2010 he was confirmed as European Commissioner for Internal Market and Services. In charge of European banking system reform, he argued for a "coherent single market with intelligent rules that apply everywhere". As European Commissioner for Internal Market and Services, Barnier handled many important issues, such as the reform of the financial sector (40 pieces of legislation between 2010 and 2014), the banking union (starting with European Banking Supervision) and the digital single market.

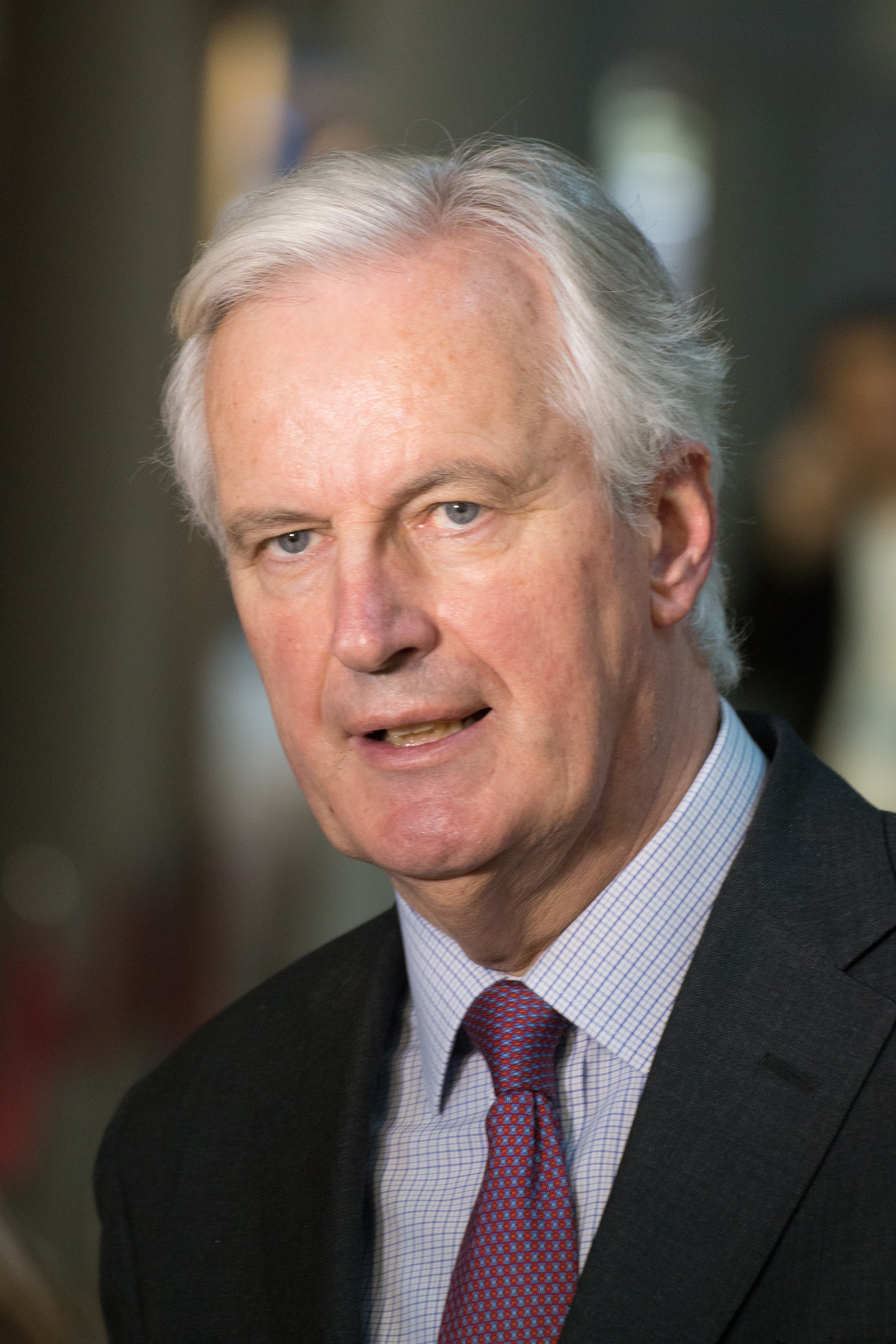
Barnier in 2014

Barnier stood unsuccessfully for the nomination of the European People's Party to become President of the European Commission in March 2014, losing to Jean-Claude Juncker. He was twice appointed Acting Commissioner for Industry and Entrepreneurship in Antonio Tajani's stead – first from 19 April to 25 May 2014, while Tajani was on electoral campaign leave for the 2014 European Parliament elections, and secondly from 1 to 16 July 2014, after Tajani was elected and took up his seat. From 2015, Barnier served as an unpaid special adviser to Juncker on defence policy.

=== Brexit negotiator ===
On 27 July 2016, Barnier was announced as the European Commission's chief negotiator with the United Kingdom over leaving the European Union, under Article 50 of the Treaty on European Union. Commenting on the appointment, Juncker said: "I wanted an experienced politician for this difficult job."

From 2019 to 2021, Barnier led the European Commission's Task Force for Relations with the United Kingdom (UK Task Force/UKTF). He was the main negotiator for the 2020 trade deal talks between the UK and EU, receiving his negotiating mandate from the European Council on 25 February 2020.

In January 2021, Barnier was appointed special adviser to President Ursula von der Leyen overseeing the ratification of the EU–UK Trade and Cooperation Agreement, under new arrangements that handed responsibility for implementing the agreement to Vice-President Maroš Šefčovič.

=== 2022 presidential campaign ===
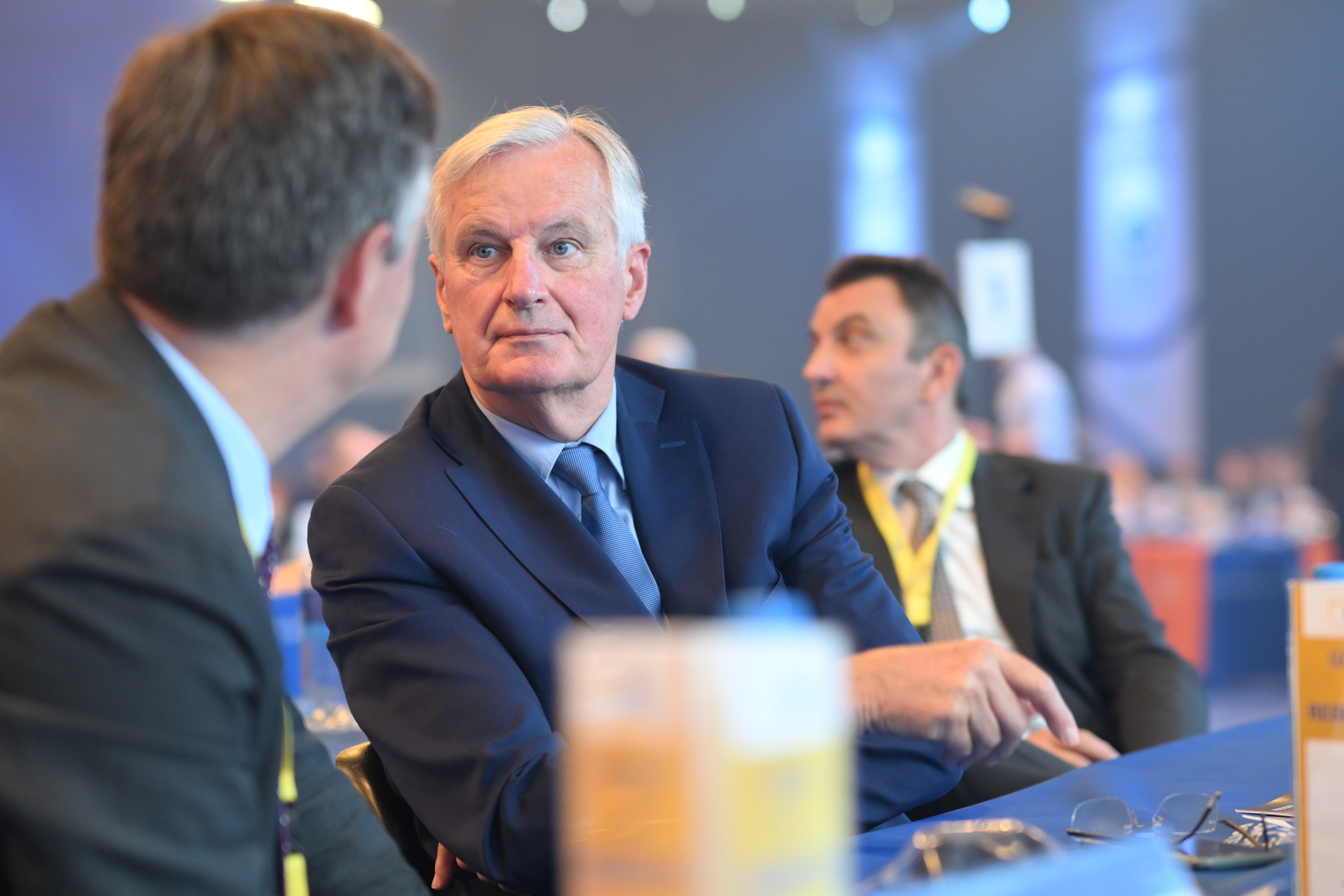
Barnier at the European People's Party conference in Rotterdam, June 2022

In February 2021, Barnier set up a political faction within the Republicans under the name "Patriot and European" in preparation for a possible bid in the 2022 presidential election.

On 27 August 2021, Barnier launched his presidential campaign. At the party's 2021 congress in December, he placed third in the first round of voting with 23.93% of the vote, after Éric Ciotti (25.59%) and Valérie Pécresse (25%); he subsequently endorsed Pécresse. Pécresse was nominated in the second round with 61% of the vote, and proceeded to place in fifth place in the first round of the presidential election, the worst result ever recorded by the Republicans or their Gaullist predecessors She endorsed Macron for the second round of the election. After his defeat, Barnier retreated from front-line politics for most of the three following years.

=== Prime Minister ===
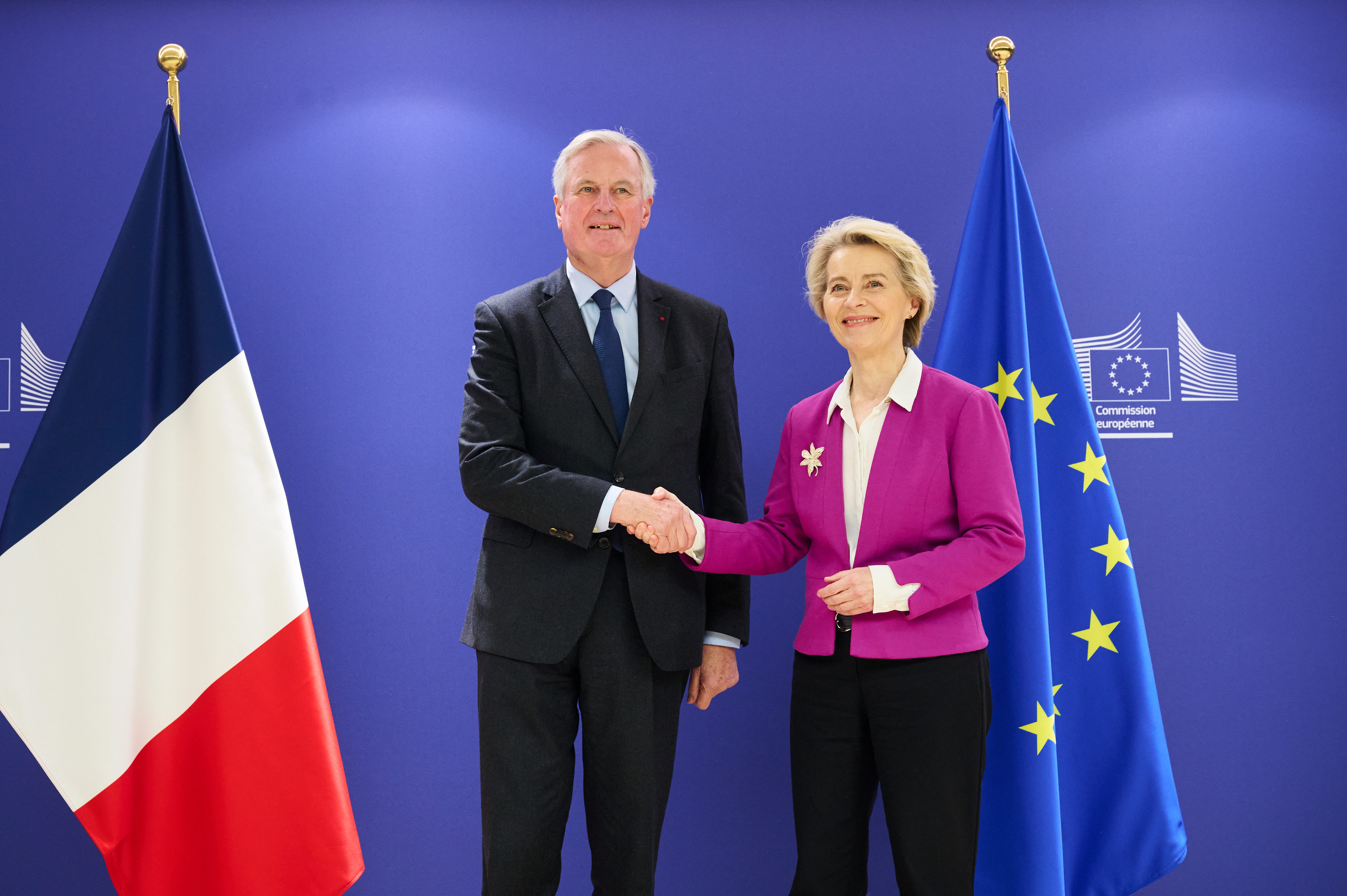
Barnier with President of the European Commission Ursula von der Leyen in Brussels, 13 November 2024

Following gains by opposition parties in the legislative elections called by President Emmanuel Macron in the summer of 2024, the prime minister, Gabriel Attal, resigned. Macron initially refused his resignation but accepted it on 16 July. On 5 September, Barnier was appointed as prime minister by Macron. The period between Attal's resignation and Barnier's appointment was the longest period that the French Fifth Republic had spent under a caretaker government. Barnier is the oldest prime minister in modern French history. Dominique Moïsi, a French political scientist, described Barnier as a compromise candidate, chosen to be acceptable to parties from the centre, the right and the far right.

Barnier's initial challenges as Prime Minister was forming a new government, passing the vote of confidence (with a minimum of 289 out of 577 votes) and submitting the 2025 budget by 1 October to parliament according to Reuters, further remarking that it would "be no easy task with the budget deficit already this year running billions of euros over target, leaving Barnier tough choices about calibrating spending cuts and tax rises" and risking the government's position in parliament. On 6 September, Barnier stated that he would continue some of Macron's policies, including refusing to repeal the raising of the retirement age to 64. On immigration he said, "There still is a feeling that our borders are sieves and that migration flows aren't being controlled." In an interview, he remarked that the new government would include the "presidential camp" and "maybe maybe ministers of the previous government".

Barnier was faced with a National Assembly divided nearly evenly into three blocs: the leftist New Popular Front with a plurality of seats, Macron's centrist to centre-right Ensemble, and the far-right National Rally. Marine Le Pen, the leader of National Rally, praised Barnier as "respectful of National Rally voters", but expressed caution as to his legislative agenda. The New Popular Front rejected Barnier's appointment and called for demonstrations against Macron. Olivier Faure, the leader of the Socialist Party, accused Macron of a "denial of democracy." Jean-Luc Mélenchon, the leader of the left-wing La France Insoumise, said that Macron had "stolen" the election by not appointing a prime minister from the New Popular Front and called for protests against the new government. According to France's Interior Ministry, around 110,000 people took part in these protests, which were held in Paris, Montauban, Nice, Lille, Strasbourg and Montpellier, as well as in several rural areas.

On 2 December 2024, Barnier invoked article 49.3 of the French Constitution to adopt the Social Security budget for 2025 without submitting it to a parliamentary vote. The decision happened after several last-ditch concessions to find a compromise failed, prompting both the New Popular Front and the National Rally to file motions of no confidence against his government. On 4 December, a majority of deputies voted to oust Barnier's government, which became the first to lose a motion of no-confidence since Georges Pompidou's in 1962.

=== Return to Parliament ===
In 2025, Barnier returned to the National Assembly after he won a by-election in Paris's 2nd constituency in the heart of the Rive Gauche, succeeding Jean Laussucq, whose 2024 election had been annulled by the Constitutional Council.

== Political positions ==
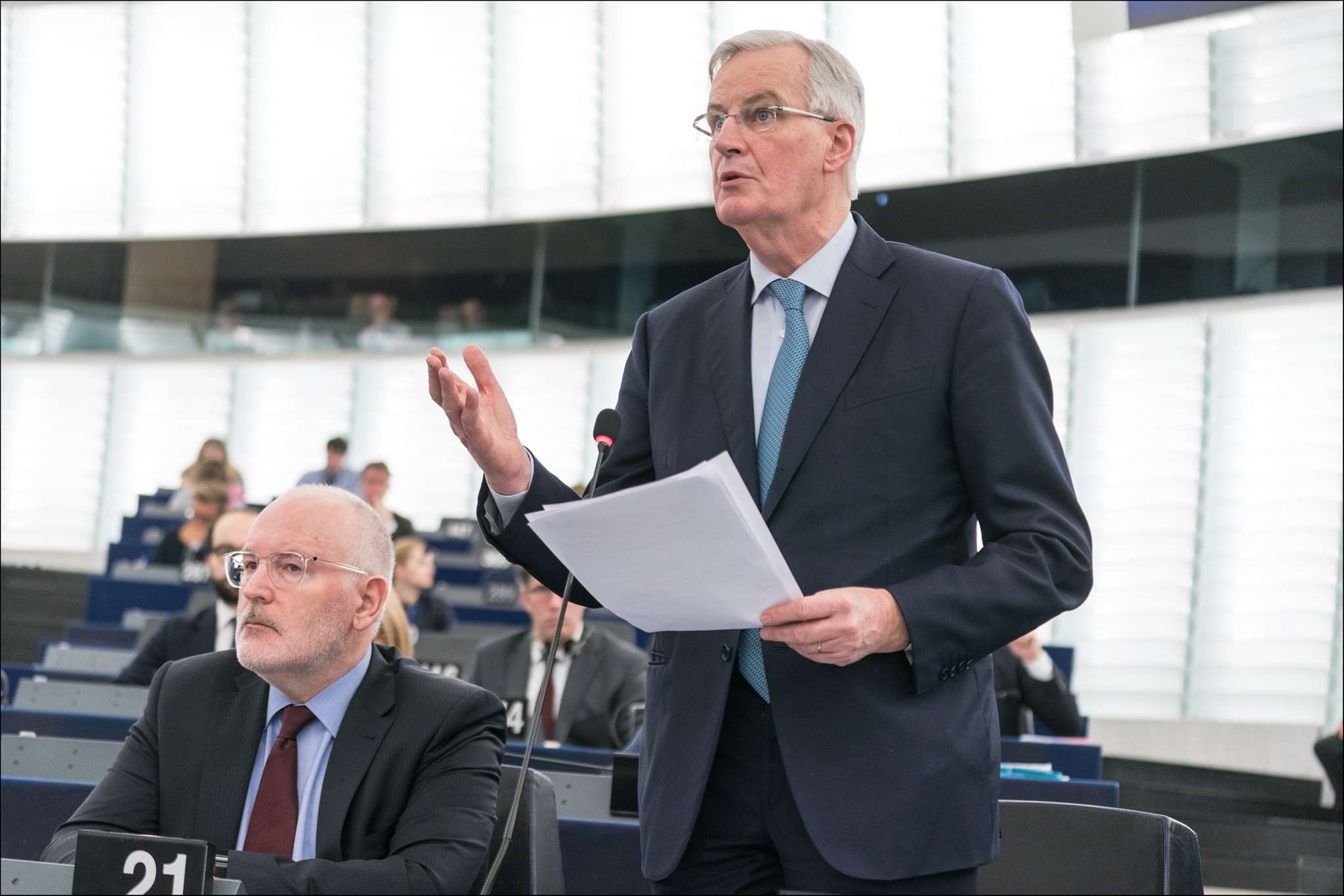
Barnier speaking about Brexit in the European Parliament in January 2019

Following his appointment as prime minister in 2024, the BBC described Barnier as "a committed, patriotic conservative in the tradition of ... Charles de Gaulle". In a conversation with Politico during July 2024, after the 7 July snap election, Barnier said France's most pressing issues were immigration, the state of its public finances and rebuilding its industrial and agricultural capacities. Upon his appointment as prime minister, he listed his main priorities as education, security and immigration control.

During his 2021 presidential campaign, Barnier stated he would be in favour of proposing a referendum on whether to tighten the legal framework for immigration in France. As a candidate, he stated his intention in "putting a stop to non-European immigration for three to five years," during an interview with French weekly magazine Le Point. He proposed to "immediately stop regularizations, rigorously limit family reunification, reduce the reception of foreign students and the systematic execution of the double penalty". (Note: The "double penalty" refers to the removal of certain protections against deportation from foreign nationals who commit crimes in France.) He also proposed expanding prison capacity by 20,000 and imposing mandatory minimum sentences for certain crimes.

On economic issues, Barnier has been characterised as close to the neoliberal policies of Emmanuel Macron, including the reduction of taxes and business regulation. As a presidential candidate, Barnier proposed cutting production taxes by €10 billion, raising the retirement age from 62 to 65, lengthening the working week and tightening the conditions for access to social assistance.

Barnier is regarded as pro-European, as supporting NATO, and as favouring support for Ukraine in its war against Russia. He was described as a "Euro-ecstatic" by François Cornut-Gentille, his supporter and colleague in the Republicans. During his presidential campaign, many media organisations commented that Barnier sounded like a Eurosceptic and Brexit supporter, contradicting previous positions he had taken on the matter.

In 1981, Barnier voted for the abolition of capital punishment, following a number of other right-wing deputies in breaking party instructions not to do so. In the same year, he was among the conservative politicians, including Jacques Chirac and François Fillon, who voted against reducing the age of consent for same-sex relationships to 15, the same as that for mixed-sex couples. He has made few statements on same-sex relations in the years since.

== Personal life ==
As president of the 1992 Winter Olympics Organising Committee, Barnier continued his ties with the International Olympic Committee, and been a member of the Sustainability and Legacy Commission of the entity, and of the board of trustees of Friends of Europe, a Brussels-based think tank. In 2021, he published My Secret Brexit Diary, a memoir of the EU's negotiations with the UK during its withdrawal from the bloc.

In 1982, Barnier married Isabelle Altmayer, a lawyer; they have three children.

In October 2024, Barnier underwent surgery for a cervical (neck) lesion.

== Honours and decorations ==
=== National honours ===
- Officer of the Legion of Honour
- Commander of the Order of Agricultural Merit
- Commander of the Order of Maritime Merit

=== Foreign honours ===
- Knight Commander of the Order of Merit of the Federal Republic of Germany
- Commander's Cross of the Order of Merit of the Republic of Poland
- Grand Cross of the Order of Prince Henry
- Grand Officier of the Military Order of Christ
- Commander of the Order of the Star
- Cross of the Order of Merit of the Sovereign Military Order of Malta
- Medal of the Oriental Republic of Uruguay

Political offices
Preceded by Ségolène Royal	Minister of the Environment; 1993–1995	Succeeded by Corinne Lepage
Preceded by Alain Lamassoure	Minister Delegate for European Affairs; 1995–1997	Succeeded by Pierre Moscovici
Preceded by Yves-Thibault de Silguy	French European Commissioner; 1999–2004; Served alongside: Pascal Lamy	Succeeded by Jacques Barrot
Preceded by Édith Cresson	French European Commissioner; 1999–2004; Served alongside: Pascal Lamy	Succeeded by Jacques Barrot
Preceded by Monika Wulf-Mathies	European Commissioner for Regional Policy; 1999–2004	Succeeded by Jacques Barrot
Preceded by Dominique de Villepin	Minister of Foreign Affairs; 2004–2005	Succeeded by Philippe Douste-Blazy
Preceded by Christine Lagarde	Minister of Agriculture and Fisheries; 2007–2009	Succeeded by Bruno Le Maire
Preceded by Jacques Barrot	French European Commissioner; 2010–2014	Succeeded by Pierre Moscovici
Preceded by Charlie McCreevy	European Commissioner for Internal Market and Services; 2010–2014	Succeeded by Elżbieta Bieńkowska as European Commissioner for Internal Market, Industry, Entrepreneurship and SMEs
Preceded by Charlie McCreevy	European Commissioner for Internal Market and Services; 2010–2014	Succeeded by Jonathan Hill as European Commissioner for Financial Stability, Financial Services and Capital Markets Union
Preceded by Gabriel Attal	Prime Minister of France; 2024	Succeeded by François Bayrou
Order of precedence
Preceded by Gabriel Attal as former Prime Minister	Order of precedence in France; Former Prime Minister	Succeeded by François Bayrou as former Prime Minister
