= Canton of Valenciennes =

Coordinates: 50.36°N 3.52°E

The canton of Valenciennes is an administrative division of the Nord department, northern France. It was created at the French canton reorganisation which came into effect in March 2015. Its seat is in Valenciennes.

It consists of the following communes:

1. Saint-Saulve
2. Valenciennes
