= 2023 French Senate election =

Senatorial election in France in September 2023

- 24 September 2023

170 of 348 seats of the Senate 175 seats needed for a majority
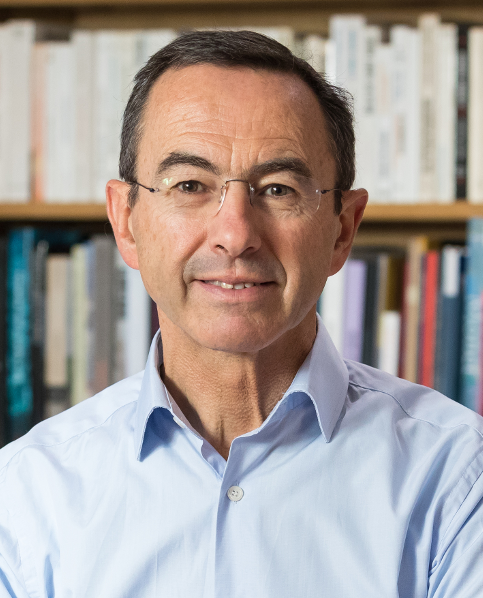

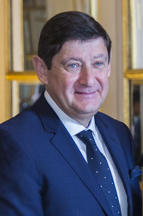

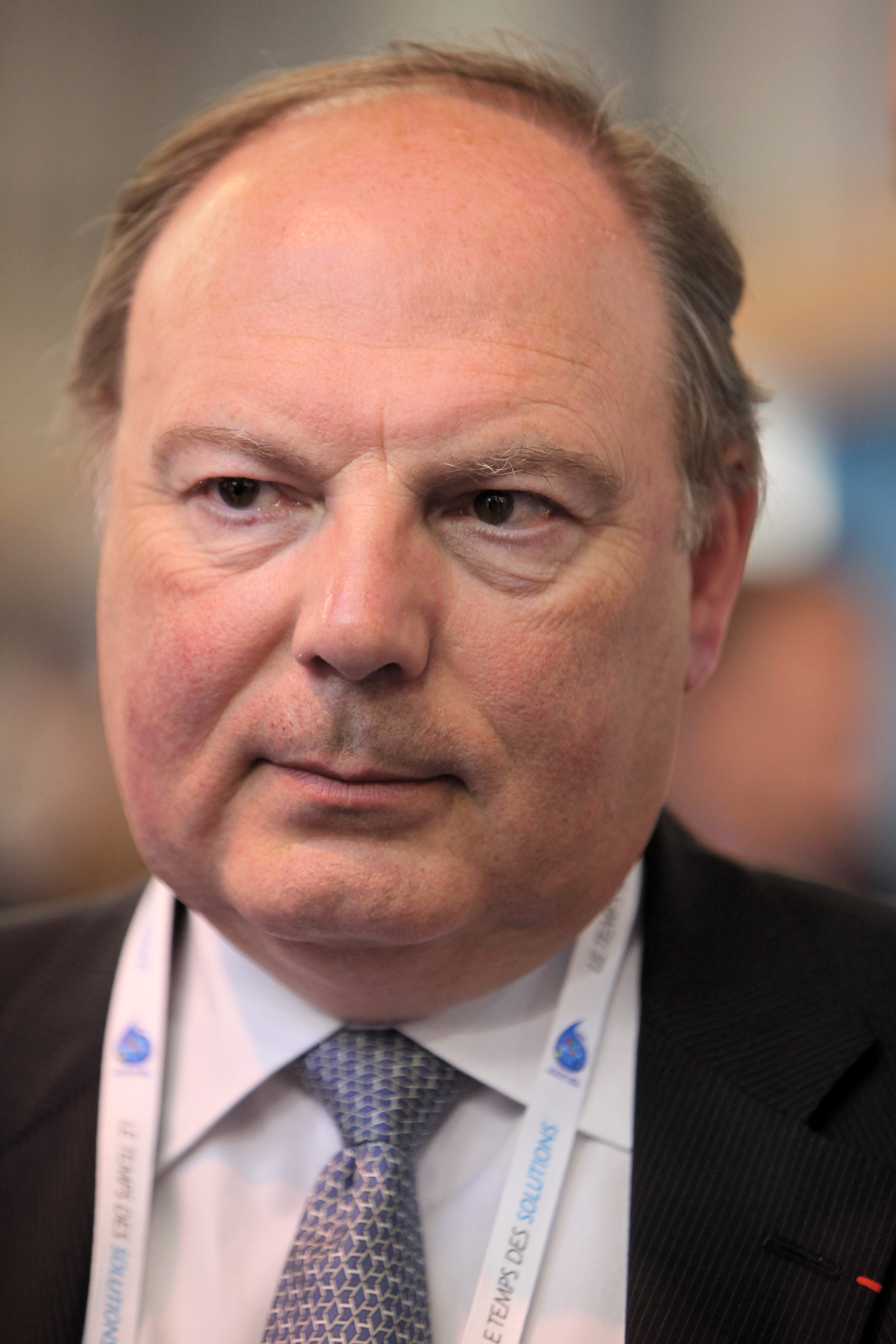

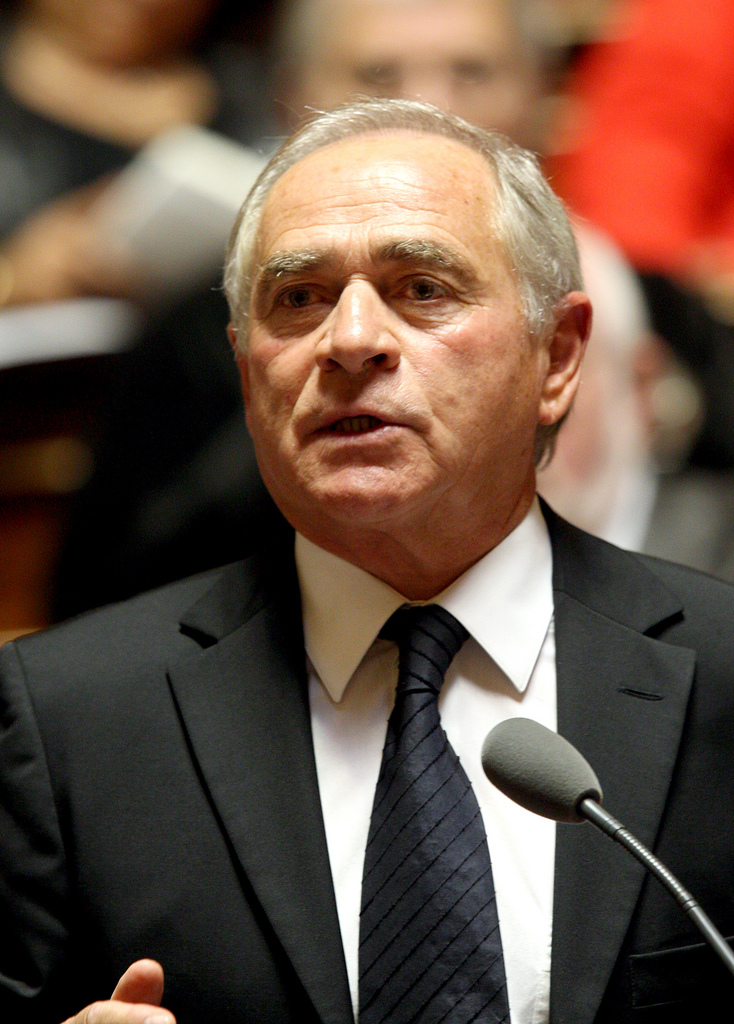

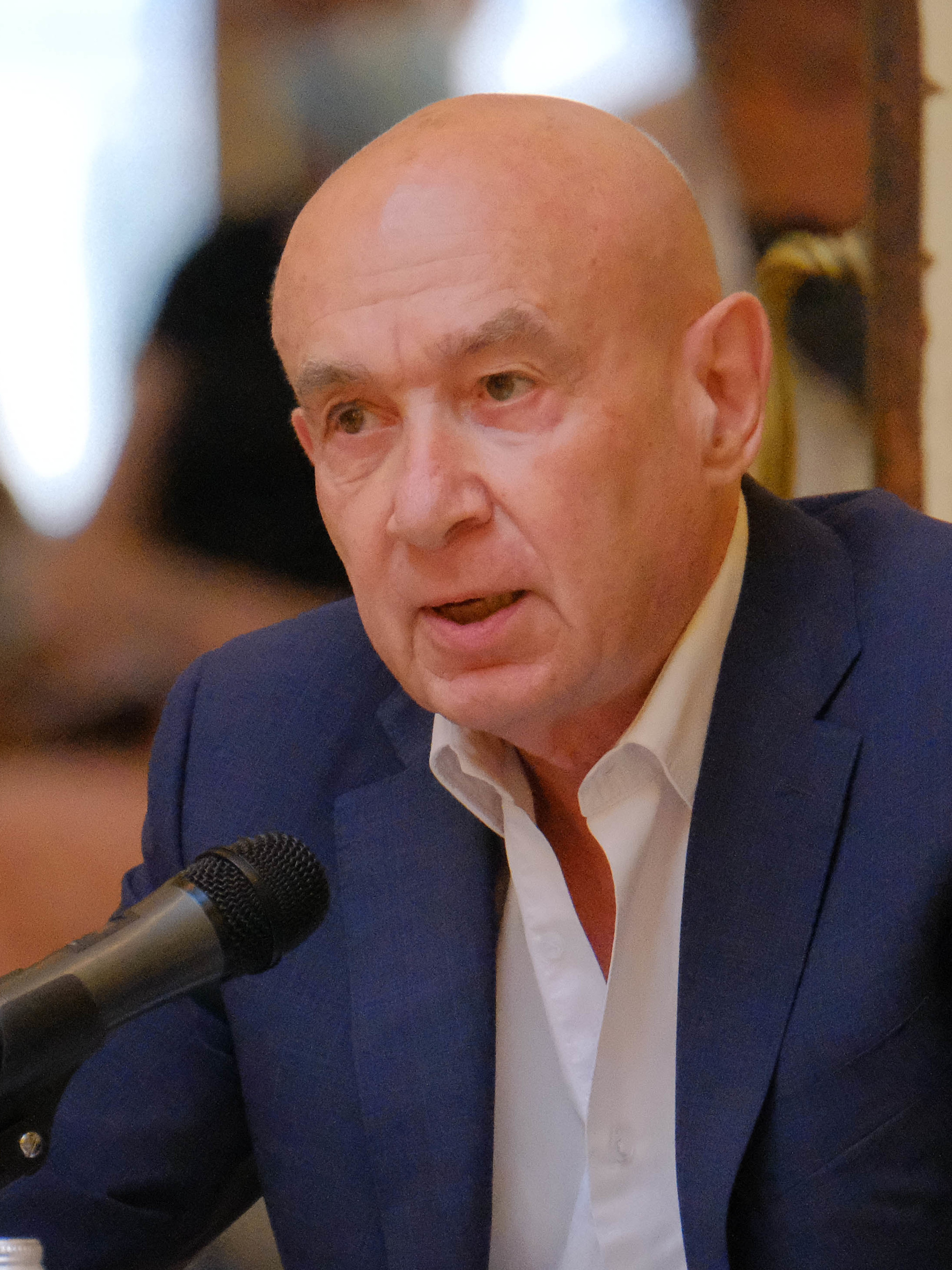

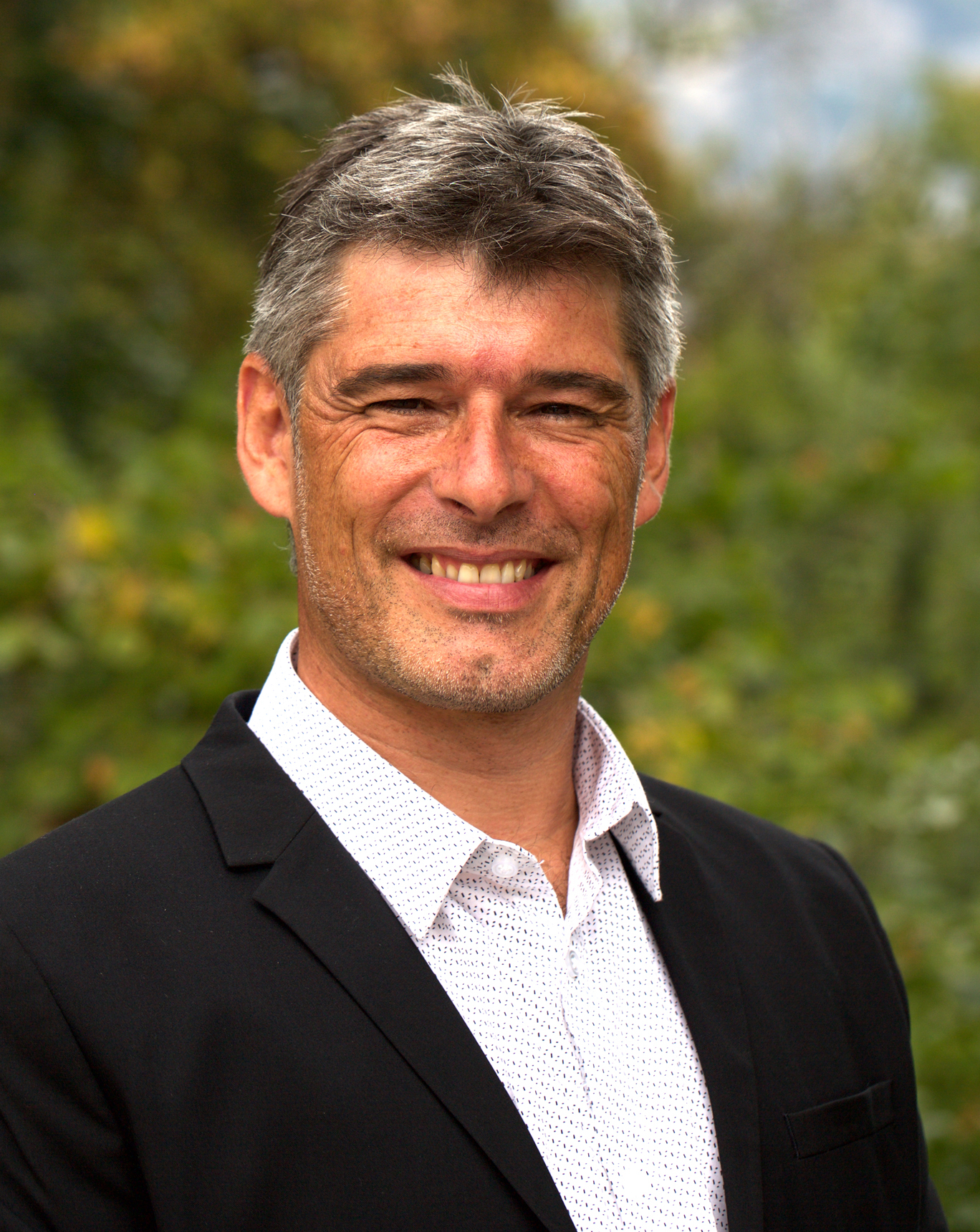
	First party	Second party	Third party
Leader	Bruno Retailleau	Patrick Kanner	Hervé Marseille
Party	LR	SER	UC
Leader's seat	Vendée	Nord	Hauts-de-Seine
Last election	146 seats	78 seats	49 seats
Seats before	145	64	57
Seats after	133	69	51
Seat change	▼12	▼9	▲2
	Fourth party	Fifth party	Sixth party
Leader	François Patriat	Cécile Cukierman	Maryse Carrère
Party	RDPI	CRCE	RDSE
Leader's seat	Côte-d'Or	Loire	Hautes-Pyrénées
Last election	21 seats	15 seats	21 seats
Seats before	24	15	14
Seats after	21	17	14
Seat change	Steady	▲2	▼7
	Seventh party	Eighth party
Leader	Claude Malhuret	Guillaume Gontard
Party	LIRT	EST
Leader's seat	Allier	Isère
Last election	11 seats	12 seats
Seats before	14	12
Seats after	17	16
Seat change	▲6	▲4
- Map of the departments with senators up for election
President of the Senate before election
Gérard Larcher
LR
Elected President of the Senate
Gérard Larcher
LR

Senatorial elections took place on 24 September 2023 to renew 170 of the 348 seats in the Senate of the French Fifth Republic. The Republicans, led by Bruno Retailleau, emerged as the largest group for the fourth consecutive cycle, but lost 12 seats.

== Context ==
=== 2020 senatorial elections ===
The 2020 senatorial elections led to a reinforcement of the right-wing and centre majority. The parties making up the majority of the National Assembly failed to gain ascendancy, while the Ecologist group reappeared.

Composition of the Senate after the 2020 elections

Because of the COVID-19 pandemic, the renewal of six senators representing French citizens living abroad was pushed back a year, while the French consular elections were themselves postponed till May 2021. As a result, their renewal took place in September 2021.

In its previous configuration from the elections of 2022, the Senate was composed of three major groups (LR, UC and SER) and six minor groups. It was thus predominantly right- and centre-leaning. The Republicans and Centrist Union group had 202 out of 348 seats, forming a majority. The main force of opposition came from the Socialists with 64 senators.

=== 2022 presidential and legislative elections ===
These elections took place 16 months after the 2022 presidential election, which saw the reelection of the outgoing President Emmanuel Macron, as well as 14 months after the 2022 legislative election, which marked the end of the 15th legislature of the Fifth Republic. The latter led to a recomposition of the National Assembly, the lower house of the French Parliament.

== Partisan objectives ==
The senatorial majority of the right and centre was the favourite to retain their majority. According to senator Roger Karoutchi of Hauts-de-Seine, the prospects ranged from a loss of 5 seats to a gain of 2 seats within the Senate Republicans, the most important group in terms of the numerical strength in the Senate.

With regard to the centrists, their objective was the surpassing the Socialist group and becoming the Senate's secondary political group. Numerically, the group's prospects ranged from a loss of 4 seats to a gain of 3 seats.

== Results ==
Department	Outgoing senator	Group	Elected senator	Group
Indre-et-Loire	Serge Babary	LR	Jean-Gérard Paumier	LR
Indre-et-Loire	Isabelle Raimond-Pavero	LR	Vincent Louault	LIRT
Indre-et-Loire	Pierre Louault	UC	Pierre-Alain Roiron	SER
Isère	Michel Savin	LR	Michel Savin	LR
Isère	Frédérique Puissat	LR	Frédérique Puissat	LR
Isère	André Vallini	SER	Damien Michallet	LR
Isère	Didier Rambaud	RDPI	Didier Rambaud	RDPI
Isère	Guillaume Gontard	GEST	Guillaume Gontard	GEST
Jura	Marie-Christine Chauvin	LR	Clément Pernot	LR
Jura	Sylvie Vermeillet	UC	Sylvie Vermeillet	UC
Landes	Monique Lubin	SER	Monique Lubin	SER
Landes	Éric Kerrouche	SER	Éric Kerrouche	SER
Loir-et-Cher	Jean-Marie Janssens	UC	Bernard Pillefer	UC
Loir-et-Cher	Jean-Paul Prince	UC	Jean-Luc Brault	LIRT
Loire	Bernard Bonne	LR	Hervé Reynaud	LR
Loire	Bernard Fournier	LR	Pierre-Jean Rochette	LIRT
Loire	Jean-Claude Tissot	SER	Jean-Claude Tissot	SER
Loire	Cécile Cukierman	CRCE	Cécile Cukierman	CRCE-K
Haute-Loire	Laurent Duplomb	LR	Laurent Duplomb	LR
Haute-Loire	Olivier Cigolotti	UC	Olivier Cigolotti	UC
Loire-Atlantique	Laurence Garnier	LR	Laurence Garnier	LR
Loire-Atlantique	Joël Guerriau	LIRT	Joël Guerriau	LIRT
Loire-Atlantique	Yannick Vaugrenard	SER	Philippe Grosvalet	RDSE
Loire-Atlantique	Michelle Meunier	SER	Karine Daniel	SER
Loire-Atlantique	Ronan Dantec	GEST	Ronan Dantec	GEST
Loiret	Hugues Saury	LR	Hugues Saury	LR
Loiret	Jean-Noël Cardoux	LR	Pauline Martin	LR
Loiret	Jean-Pierre Sueur	SER	Christophe Chaillou	SER
Lot	Jean-Claude Requier	RDSE	Raphaël Daubet	RDSE
Lot	Angèle Préville	SER	Jean-Marc Vayssouze-Faure	SER
Lot-et-Garonne	Christine Bonfanti-Dossat	LR	Christine Bonfanti-Dossat	LR
Lot-et-Garonne	Jean-Pierre Moga	UC	Michel Masset	RDSE
Lozère	Guylène Pantel	RDSE	Guylène Pantel	RDSE
Maine-et-Loire	Stéphane Piednoir	LR	Stéphane Piednoir	LR
Maine-et-Loire	Catherine Deroche	LR	Corinne Bourcier	LIRT
Maine-et-Loire	Emmanuel Capus	LIRT	Emmanuel Capus	LIRT
Maine-et-Loire	Joël Bigot	SER	Grégory Blanc	GEST
Manche	Philippe Bas	LR	Philippe Bas	LR
Manche	Béatrice Gosselin	LR	Béatrice Gosselin	LR
Manche	Jean-Michel Houllegatte	SER	Sébastien Fagnen	SER
Marne	René-Paul Savary	LR	Christian Bruyen	LR
Marne	Françoise Férat	UC	Anne-Sophie Romagny	UC
Marne	Yves Détraigne	UC	Cédric Chevalier	LIRT
Haute-Marne	Bruno Sido	LR	Bruno Sido	LR
Haute-Marne	Charles Guené	LR	Anne-Marie Nédélec	LR
Mayenne	Guillaume Chevrollier	LR	Guillaume Chevrollier	LR
Mayenne	Elisabeth Doineau	UC	Elisabeth Doineau	UC
Meurthe-et-Moselle	Jean-François Husson	LR	Jean-François Husson	LR
Meurthe-et-Moselle	Véronique Guillotin	RDSE	Véronique Guillotin	RDSE
Meurthe-et-Moselle	Olivier Jacquin	SER	Olivier Jacquin	SER
Meurthe-et-Moselle	Véronique Del Fabro	LR	Silvana Silvani	CRCE-K
Meuse	Gérard Longuet	LR	Jocelyne Antoine	UC
Meuse	Franck Menonville	LIRT	Franck Menonville	UC
Morbihan	Muriel Jourda	LR	Muriel Jourda	LR
Morbihan	Jacques le Nay	UC	Yves Bleunven	UC
Morbihan	Joël Labbé	GEST	Simon Uzenat	SER
Moselle	Jean-Louis Masson	RASNAG	Khalifé Khalifé	LR
Moselle	Catherine Belrhiti	LR	Catherine Belrhiti	LR
Moselle	Jean-Marie Mizzon	UC	Jean-Marie Mizzon	UC
Moselle	Christine Herzog	UC	Christine Herzog	UC
Moselle	Jean-Marc Todeschini	SER	Michaël Weber	SER
Nièvre	Nadia Sollogoub	UC	Nadia Sollogoub	UC
Nièvre	Patrice Joly	SER	Patrice Joly	SER
Nord	Brigitte Lherbier	LR	Joshua Hochart	RASNAG
Nord	Marc-Philippe Daubresse	LR	Marc-Philippe Daubresse	LR
Nord	Olivier Henno	UC	Olivier Henno	UC
Nord	Valérie Létard	UC	Guislain Cambier	UC
Nord	Frédéric Marchand	RDPI	Franck Dhersin	UC
Nord	Jean-Pierre Decool	LIRT	Marie-Claude Lermytte	LIRT
Nord	Dany Wattebled	LIRT	Dany Wattebled	LIRT
Nord	Martine Filleul	SER	Audrey Linkenheld	SER
Nord	Patrick Kanner	SER	Patrick Kanner	SER
Nord	Eric Bocquet	CRCE	Eric Bocquet	CRCE-K
Nord	Michelle Gréaume	CRCE	Michelle Gréaume	CRCE-K
Oise	Olivier Paccaud	LR	Olivier Paccaud	LR
Oise	Jérôme Bascher	LR	Sylvie Valente-Le Hir	LR
Oise	Edouard Courtial	LR	Edouard Courtial	UC
Oise	Laurence Rossignol	SER	Alexandre Ouizille	SER
Orne	Nathalie Goulet	UC	Nathalie Goulet	UC
Orne	Vincent Segouin	LR	Olivier Bitz	RDPI
Pas-de-Calais	Michel Dagbert	RDPI	Christopher Szczurek	RASNAG
Pas-de-Calais	Jean-François Rapin	LR	Jean-François Rapin	LR
Pas-de-Calais	Amel Gacquerre	UC	Amel Gacquerre	UC
Pas-de-Calais	Jean-Marie Vanlerenberghe	UC	Jean-Marie Vanlerenberghe	UC
Pas-de-Calais	Sabine Van Heghe	SER	Jérôme Darras	SER
Pas-de-Calais	Jean-Pierre Corbisez	RDSE	Jean-Pierre Corbisez	CRCE-K
Pas-de-Calais	Cathy Apourceau-Poly	CRCE	Cathy Apourceau-Poly	CRCE-K
Puy-de-Dôme	Jean-Marc Boyer	LR	Jean-Marc Boyer	LR
Puy-de-Dôme	Éric Gold	RDSE	Éric Gold	RDSE
Puy-de-Dôme	Jacques-Bernard Magner	SER	Marion Canales	SER
Pyrénées-Atlantiques	Max Brisson	LR	Max Brisson	LR
Pyrénées-Atlantiques	Denise Saint-Pé	UC	Denise Saint-Pé	UC
Pyrénées-Atlantiques	Frédérique Espagnac	SER	Frédérique Espagnac	SER
Hautes-Pyrénées	Maryse Carrère	RDSE	Maryse Carrère	RDSE
Hautes-Pyrénées	Viviane Artigalas	SER	Viviane Artigalas	SER
Pyrénées-Orientales	Jean Sol	LR	Jean Sol	LR
Pyrénées-Orientales	François Calvet	LR	Lauriane Josende	LR
Paris	Catherine Dumas	LR	Catherine Dumas	LR
Paris	Pierre Charon	LR	Francis Szpiner	LR
Paris	Philippe Dominati	LR	Marie-Claire Carrère-Gée	LR
Paris	Céline Boulay-Espéronnier	LR	Agnès Evren	LR
Paris	Julien Bargeton	RDPI	Colombe Brossel	SER
Paris	Rémi Féraud	SER	Rémi Féraud	SER
Paris	Marie-Pierre de La Gontrie	SER	Marie-Pierre de La Gontrie	SER
Paris	Bernard Jomier	SER	Bernard Jomier	SER
Paris	David Assouline	SER	Yannick Jadot	GEST
Paris	Esther Benbassa	RASNAG	Anne Souyris	GEST
Paris	Marie-Noëlle Lienemann	CRCE	Antoinette Guhl	GEST
Paris	Pierre Laurent	CRCE	Ian Brossat	CRCE-K
Seine-et-Marne	Claudine Thomas	LR	Aymeric Durox	RASNAG
Seine-et-Marne	Pierre Cuypers	LR	Pierre Cuypers	LR
Seine-et-Marne	Anne Chain-Larché	LR	Anne Chain-Larché	LR
Seine-et-Marne	Colette Mélot	LIRT	Louis Vogel	LIRT
Seine-et-Marne	Vincent Eblé	SER	Vincent Eblé	SER
Seine-et-Marne	Arnaud de Belenet	UC	Marianne Margaté	CRCE-K
Yvelines	Gérard Larcher	LR	Gérard Larcher	LR
Yvelines	Sophie Primas	LR	Sophie Primas	LR
Yvelines	Marta de Cidrac	LR	Marta de Cidrac	LR
Yvelines	Michel Laugier	UC	Michel Laugier	UC
Yvelines	Martin Lévrier	RDPI	Martin Lévrier	RDPI
Yvelines	Toine Bourrat	LR	Ghislaine Senée	GEST
Essonne	Jean-Raymond Hugonet	LR	Jean-Raymond Hugonet	LR
Essonne	Laure Darcos	LR	Laure Darcos	LIRT
Essonne	Vincent Delahaye	UC	Vincent Delahaye	UC
Essonne	Jocelyne Guidez	UC	Jocelyne Guidez	UC
Essonne	Daphné Ract-Madoux	UC	David Ros	SER
Hauts-de-Seine	Roger Karoutchi	LR	Roger Karoutchi	LR
Hauts-de-Seine	Christine Lavarde	LR	Christine Lavarde	LR
Hauts-de-Seine	Philippe Pemezec	LR	Marie-Do Aeschlimann	LR
Hauts-de-Seine	Hervé Marseille	UC	Hervé Marseille	UC
Hauts-de-Seine	André Gattolin	RDPI	Isabelle Florennes	UC
Hauts-de-Seine	Xavier Iacovelli	RDPI	Xavier Iacovelli	RDPI
Hauts-de-Seine	Pierre Ouzoulias	CRCE	Pierre Ouzoulias	CRCE-K
Seine-Saint-Denis	Thierry Meignen	LR	Thierry Meignen	LR
Seine-Saint-Denis	Vincent Capo-Canellas	UC	Vincent Capo-Canellas	UC
Seine-Saint-Denis	Annie Delmont-Koropoulis	LR	Ahmed Laouedj	RDSE
Seine-Saint-Denis	Gilbert Roger	SER	Corinne Narassiguin	SER
Seine-Saint-Denis	Eliane Assassi	CRCE	Adel Ziane	SER
Seine-Saint-Denis	Fabien Gay	CRCE	Fabien Gay	CRCE-K
Val-de-Marne	Christian Cambon	LR	Christian Cambon	LR
Val-de-Marne	Catherine Procaccia	LR	Marie-Carole Ciuntu	LR
Val-de-Marne	Laurent Lafon	UC	Laurent Lafon	UC
Val-de-Marne	Laurence Cohen	CRCE	Laurence Rossignol	SER
Val-de-Marne	Daniel Breuiller	GEST	Akli Mellouli	GEST
Val-de-Marne	Pascal Savoldelli	CRCE	Pascal Savoldelli	CRCE-K
Val-d'Oise	Arnaud Bazin	LR	Arnaud Bazin	LR
Val-d'Oise	Jacqueline Eustache-Brinio	LR	Jacqueline Eustache-Brinio	LR
Val-d'Oise	Sébastien Meurant	LR	Daniel Fargeot	UC
Val-d'Oise	Rachid Temal	SER	Rachid Temal	SER
Val-d'Oise	Alain Richard	RDPI	Pierre Barros	CRCE-K
Guadeloupe	Dominique Théophile	RDPI	Dominique Théophile	RDPI
Guadeloupe	Victoire Jasmin	SER	Solanges Nadille	RDPI
Guadeloupe	Victorin Lurel	SER	Victorin Lurel	SER
Martinique	Maurice Antiste	SER	Frédéric Buval	RDPI
Martinique	Catherine Conconne	SER	Catherine Conconne	SER
Réunion	Viviane Malet	LR	Viviane Malet	LR
Réunion	Jean-Louis Lagourgue	LIRT	Stéphane Fouassin	RDPI
Réunion	Nassimah Dindar	UC	Audrey Bélim	SER
Réunion	Michel Dennemont	RDPI	Evelyne Corbière	CRCE-K
Mayotte	Thani Mohamed Soilihi	RDPI	Thani Mohamed Soilihi	RDPI
Mayotte	Abdallah Hassani	RDPI	Saïd Omar Oili	RDPI
New Caledonia	Pierre Frogier	LR	Georges Naturel	LR
New Caledonia	Gérard Poadja	UC	Robert Xowie	CRCE-K

=== Senators who lost reelection ===
Senator	Group	Department	Since
Isabelle Raimond-Pavero	LR	Indre-et-Loire	2017
Angèle Préville	SER	Lot	2017
Jean-Pierre Moga	UC	Lot-et-Garonne	2017
Brigitte Lherbier	LR	Nord	2017
Frédéric Marchand	RDPI	Nord	2017
Martine Filleul	SER	Nord	2017
Jérôme Bascher	LR	Oise	2017
Vincent Segouin	LR	Orne	2018
Sabine Van Heghe	SER	Pas-de-Calais	2017
Pierre Charon	LR	Paris	2011
Julien Bargeton	RDPI	Paris	2017
Claudine Thomas	LR	Seine-et-Marne	2017
Toine Bourrat	LR	Yvelines	2020
Daphné Ract-Madoux	UC	Essonne	2022
Philippe Pemezec	LR	Hauts-de-Seine	2017
Sébastien Meurant	LR	Val-d'Oise	2017
Alain Richard	RDPI	Val-d'Oise	2011
Victoire Jasmin	SER	Guadeloupe	2017
Nassimah Dindar	UC	Réunion	2017
Pierre Frogier	LR	New Caledonia	2011
Gérard Poadja	UC	New Caledonia	2017

== See also ==
- Elections in France
- French Senate elections
