= List of senators of Pyrénées-Atlantiques =

Location of Pyrénées-Atlantiques in France

Following is a list of senators of Pyrénées-Atlantiques, people who have represented the department of Pyrénées-Atlantiques in the Senate of France.

== Third Republic ==
Senators for Pyrénées-Atlantiques under the French Third Republic were:

Election	Names	Notes
1876	Jules de Lestapis	
1876	Adolphe Daguenet	
1876	Elie de Gontaut-Biron	
1882	Marcel Barthe	
1882	Louis Jacques Lacaze	
1882	Michel Renaud	Died 1885
1885	Jean-Baptiste Plantié	Replaced Michel Renaud; died 1889
1890	Séraphin Haulon	Replaced Jean-Baptiste Plantié
1891	Marcel Barthe	
1891	Séraphin Haulon	
1891	Louis Vignancour	
1900	Séraphin Haulon	
1900	Justin Quintaà	Died 1900
1900	Martial Berdoly	Died 1905
1900	Jean Cassou	Replaced Justin Quintaà; died 1906
1906	Damien Catalogne	Replaced Martial Berdoly
1906	Joseph de Gontaut-Biron	Replaced Jean Cassou
1909	Damien Catalogne	
1909	Henri Faisans	
1909	Pierre Forsans	
1920	Damien Catalogne	
1920	Albert Le Barillier	
1920	Henri Faisans	Died 1922
1922	Louis Barthou	Replaced Henri Faisans
1927	Léon Bérard	
1927	Damien Catalogne	Died 1934
1927	Louis Barthou	Died 1934
1934	Jean Lissar	By-election
1934	Auguste Champetier de Ribes	By-election
1936	Léon Bérard	
1936	Auguste Champetier de Ribes	
1936	Jean Lissar	

== Fourth Republic ==
Senators for Pyrénées-Atlantiques under the French Fourth Republic were:

Election	Names
1946	Étienne Landaboure
1946	Jacques de Menditte
1948	Jean Biatarana
1948	René Cassagne
1948	Jacques de Menditte
1952	Jean Biatarana
1952	Jacques de Menditte
1952	Jean-Louis Tinaud
1958	Jean Errecart
1958	Jacques de Menditte
1958	Jean-Louis Tinaud

== Fifth Republic ==
Senators for Pyrénées-Atlantiques under the French Fifth Republic were:

Election	Names	Notes
1959	Guy Petit	
1959	Jean Errecart	
1959	Jean-Louis Tinaud	
1965	Guy Petit	
1965	Jean Errecart	Died 1971
1965	Jean-Louis Tinaud	Named to government 1969
1965	Emmanuel Lartigue	Replaced Jean-Louis Tinaud in 1969
1965	Henri Sibor	Replaced Jean Errecart in 1971
1974	Pierre Sallenave	
1974	Michel Labéguerie	Died 1980
1974	Guy Petit	
1974	Jacques Moutet	Replaced Michel Labéguerie in 1980
1983	Auguste Cazalet	
1983	Franz Duboscq	
1983	Jacques Moutet	
1992	Didier Borotra	
1992	Auguste Cazalet	
1992	Louis Althapé	
2001	Didier Borotra	
2001	Auguste Cazalet	
2001	André Labarrère	Died 2006
2001	Annie Jarraud-Vergnolle	Replaced André Labarrère in 2006
2011	Frédérique Espagnac	
2011	Georges Labazée	
2011	Jean-Jacques Lasserre	
2017	Frédérique Espagnac	
2017	Denise Saint-Pé	
2017	Max Brisson	

== Sources ==
- Liste des anciens sénateurs de la IIIème République par circonscription (in French), Sénat de France
- Liste des anciens sénateurs de la IVème République par circonscription (in French), Sénat de France
- Liste des anciens sénateurs de la Vème République par circonscription (in French), Sénat de France
- Liste par département - Pyrénées-Atlantiques (in French), Sénat de France
