= Arnaud Bazin =

French politician (born 1959)

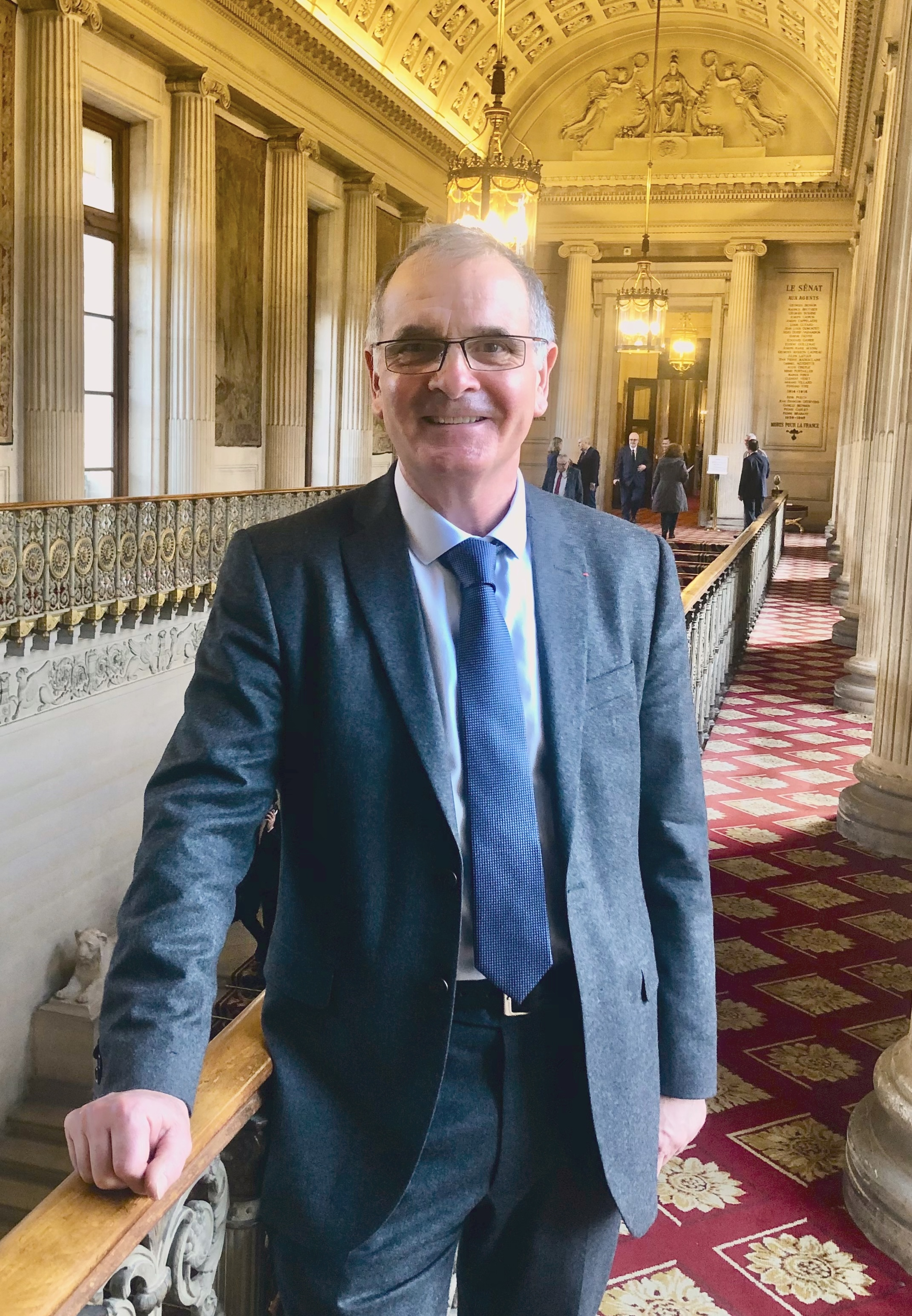
- Bazin in 2024

Senator for Val-d'Oise
- Incumbent
- Assumed office 1 October 2017

Personal details
- Born: 10 January 1959 (age 67) Rouen, France
- Party: The Republicans (since 2015)

Arnaud Bazin (born 10 January 1959) is a French politician and veterinarian, who has served as a senator for Val-d'Oise since 2017. A member of The Republicans, Bazin was previously the president of the Departmental Council of Val-d'Oise from 2011 until 2017.

== Political career ==
Bazin joined The Republicans in the fall of 2015.

During the 2017 French Senate election, Bazin was elected Senator for Val-d'Oise, alongside Jacqueline Eustache-Brinio, Sébastien Meurant, Alain Richard, and Rachid Temal. Affected by legislation limiting the accumulation of mandates, Bazin resigned from his positions as president of the Departmental Council of Val-d'Oise and the Communauté de communes du Haut Val-d'Oise.
