= Senator Webber =

Senator Webber may refer to:

- Michael Webber (politician) (born 1978), Michigan State Senate
- Susan Webber (politician) (fl. 2010s–2020s), Montana State Senate
- Ruth Webber (born 1965), Senate of Australia
- William L. Webber (1825–1901), Michigan State Senate

== See also ==
- Senator Weber (disambiguation)
