= Pierre Charon =

French politician (born 1951)

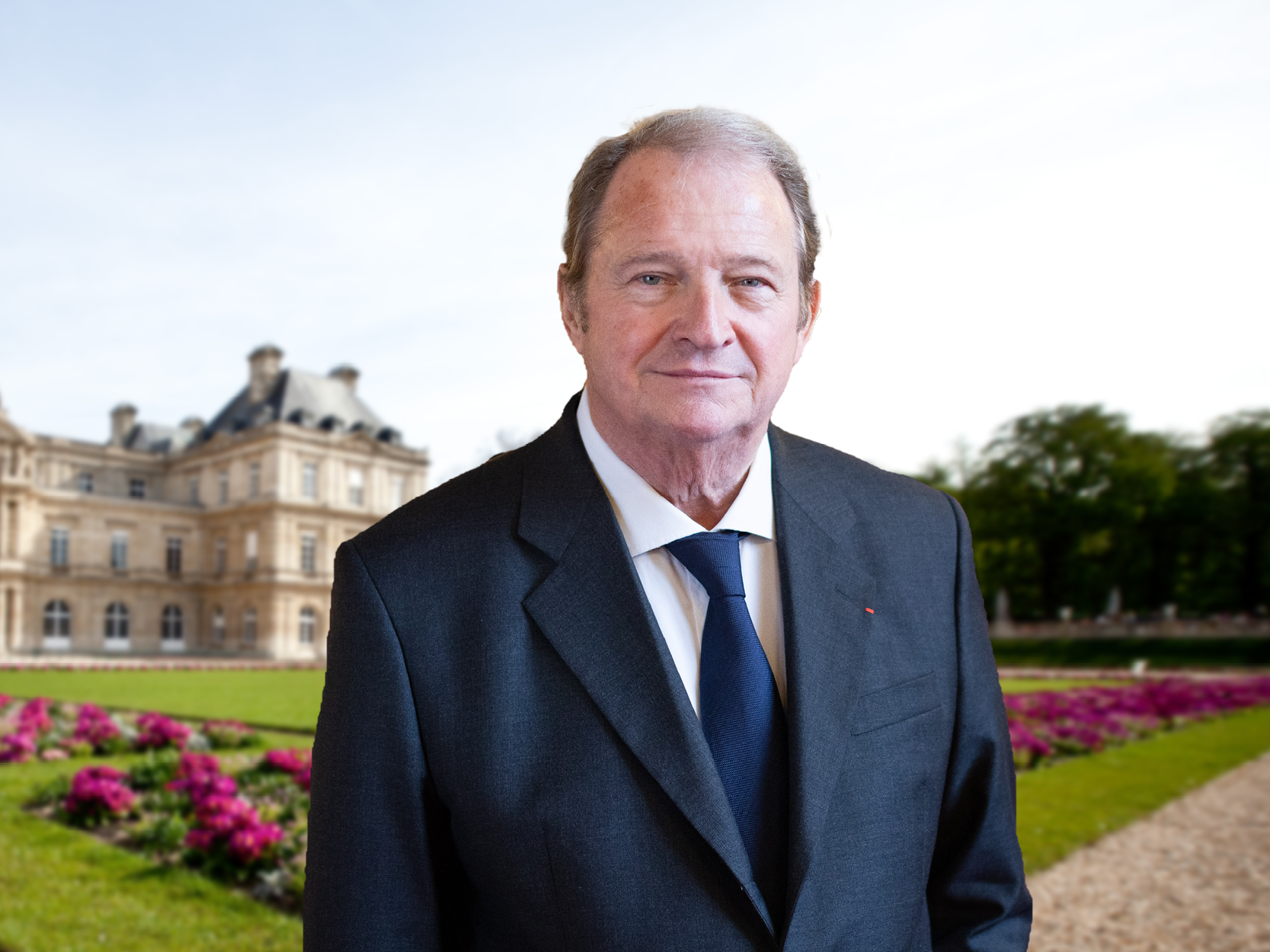

Senator for Paris
- In office 1 October 2011 – 1 October 2023

Councillor of Paris
- In office 18 March 2001 – 28 June 2020
- Constituency: 15th arrondissement

Personal details
- Born: Pierre Yves Charon; 1 March 1951 (age 75) 15th arrondissement of Paris, France
- Party: Union of Democrats for the Republic (until 1976); Rally for the Republic (1976–2002); Union for a Popular Movement (2002–2015); The Republicans (2015–present)

Pierre Yves Charon (French pronunciation: [pjɛʁ ʃaʁɔ̃]; born 1 March 1951) is a French politician who represented Paris in the Senate for two terms from 2011 to 2023. A member of The Republicans (LR) and its predecessor parties, he also sat in the Council of Paris for three terms from 2001 to 2020.

Charon ran for a third term in the Senate in 2023 but failed to be reelected. He has been described as close to Presidents Jacques Chirac, Nicolas Sarkozy and Emmanuel Macron.

== Honours ==
- Officer of the Legion of Honour (2024)
