= Senator Weber =

Senator Weber may refer to:

== France ==
- Henri Weber (1944–2020), senator for Seine-Maritime in 1995–2004
- Michaël Weber (born 1974), senator for Moselle since 2023

== United States ==
- Bill Weber (New York politician) (born 1969), New York State Senate
- Charles Weber (politician) (1923–1989), Florida State Senate
- Mark Weber (politician) (fl. 2020s), North Dakota State Senate

== See also ==
- Senator Webber (disambiguation)
