= Joël Guerriau =

French politician (born 1957)

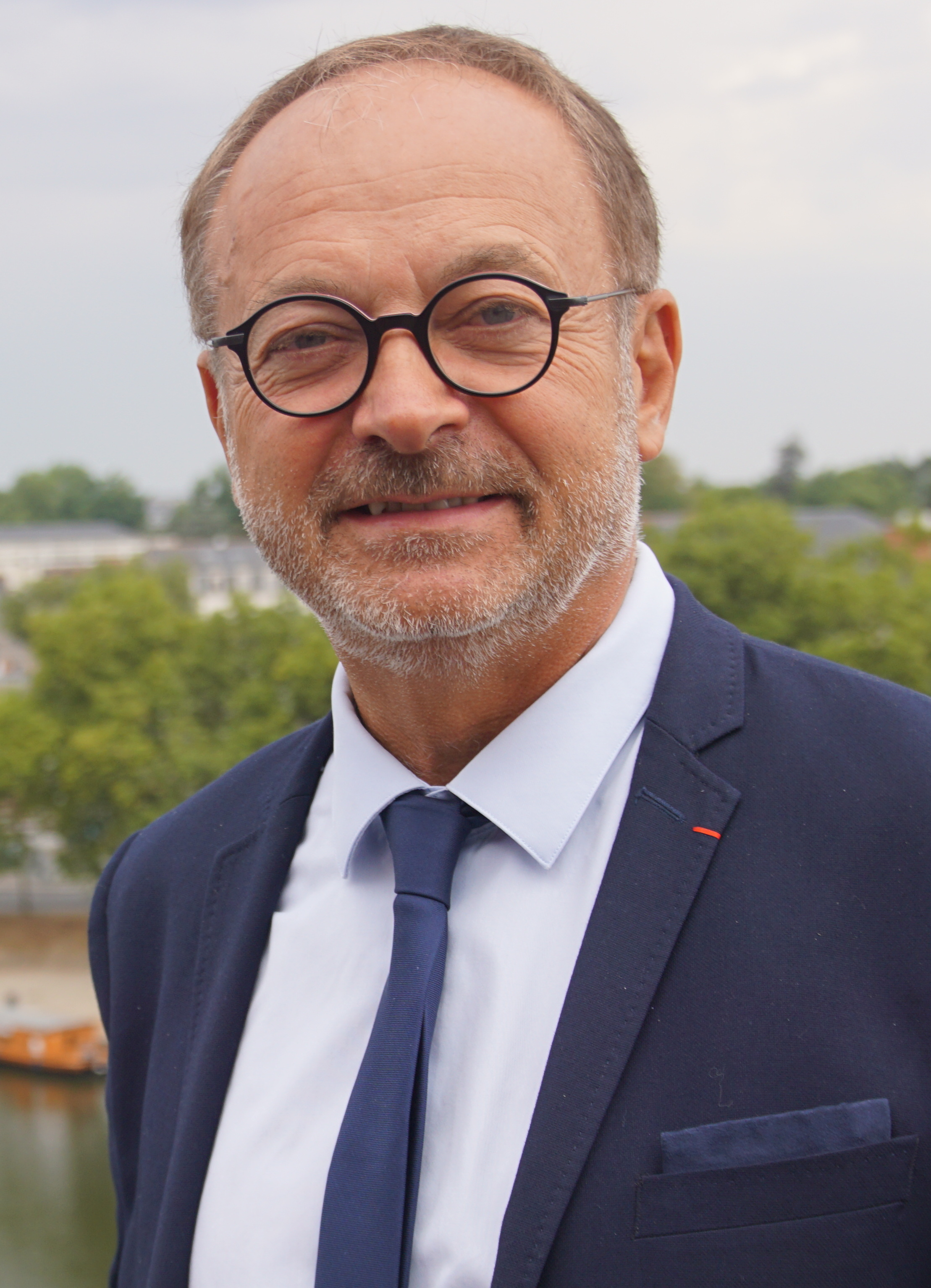
- Guerriau in 2016

Senator for Loire-Atlantique
- In office 1 October 2011 – 17 October 2025

Mayor of Saint-Sébastien-sur-Loire
- In office 19 June 1995 – 9 October 2017
- Preceded by: Martine Laurent
- Succeeded by: Laurent Turquois

Personal details
- Born: 9 November 1957 (age 68) Uckange, France
- Party: Horizons (2022–present)
- Other political affiliations: Union of Democrats and Independents; Radical Movement
- Education: Panthéon-Sorbonne University

Joël Guerriau (born 9 November 1957) is a French banker and centre-right politician. Formerly a senator for Loire-Atlantique, Guerriau was a secretary of the French Senate and vice-chair of the Committee on Foreign Affairs, Defence and the Armed Forces. He was first elected to the Senate in 2011, then reelected in 2017 and 2023 but resigned in October 2025. He sat with The Independents – Republic and Territories group (LIRT).

From 1995 to 2017, he held the mayorship of Saint-Sébastien-sur-Loire. From 1996 to 2011, he also held a seat in the General Council of Loire-Atlantique for the canton of Nantes-10. Guerriau is a knight of the Legion of Honour and officer of the Ordre des Palmes académiques.

Guerriau was taken into custody in November 2023 on suspicion of having drugged Sandrine Josso, a member of the National Assembly, for the purpose of sexual assault. Guerriau is not protected by parliamentary immunity due to an exception for crimes caught in the act. After a trial, Guerriau was convicted and sentenced to four years' imprisonment in 2026 but has appealed his sentence; he has admitted having given her the spiked drink, but stated that the incident, which took place in his apartment when they were celebrating an electoral victory, was an accident, and that he had intended to take the drug himself.
