= Viviane Artigalas =

French politician of the Socialist Party (born 1956)

Senator for Hautes-Pyrénées
- Incumbent
- Assumed office 2 October 2017

Personal details
- Born: 22 October 1956 (age 69)
- Party: Socialist Party
- Occupation: Secondary school Principal

Viviane Artigalas (born 22 October 1956) is a French politician of the Socialist Party. She became a senator for Hautes-Pyrénées in October 2017.

== Career ==
Artigalas started her political career as a municipal councillor of Milly-la-Forêt, Essonne. She supported candidate Ségolène Royal in the 2007 presidential election.

Artigalas was elected mayor of Arrens-Marsous, Hautes-Pyrénées in 2012 and re-elected in 2014. She was the deputy chairwoman of the Val d'Azun community of communes from 2008 to 2016, then a member of the Pyrénées Vallées des Gaves community of communes in 2017. Besides, she was a regional councillor of Midi-Pyrénées between 2010, and 2015 and became the deputy chairwoman of the Midi-Pyrénées Regional Council.

Artigalas stood in the 2011 cantonal election in the canton of Aucun, but was defeated by Marc Léo.

=== Member of the Senate, 2017–present ===
On 24 September 2017 Artigalas was elected a senator for Hautes-Pyrénées. She was appointed as the secretary of the Commission for Economic Affairs.

== Other activities ==
- Caisse des dépôts et consignations, Member of the Supervisory Board
