= Audrey Bélim =

French politician (born 1987)

Member of the Senate
- Incumbent
- Assumed office 2 October 2023
- Constituency: Réunion

Personal details
- Born: 16 April 1987 (age 38)
- Party: Socialist Party

Audrey Bélim (born 16 April 1987) is a French politician of the Socialist Party. Since 2023, she has been a member of the Senate. She was previously a member of the Departmental Council of Réunion, the municipal council of Saint-Denis, and the communauté council of Nord de La Réunion.
