= Vincent Louault =

French politician (born 1972)

Member of the Senate
- Incumbent
- Assumed office 1 October 2023
- Constituency: Indre-et-Loire

Personal details
- Born: 24 May 1972 (age 53)
- Party: Horizons
- Parent: Pierre Louault (father)

Vincent Louault (born 24 May 1972) is a French politician serving as a member of the Senate since 2023. From 2014 to 2023, he served as mayor of Cigogné. He is the son of Pierre Louault.
