= Adel Ziane =

French politician (born 1979)

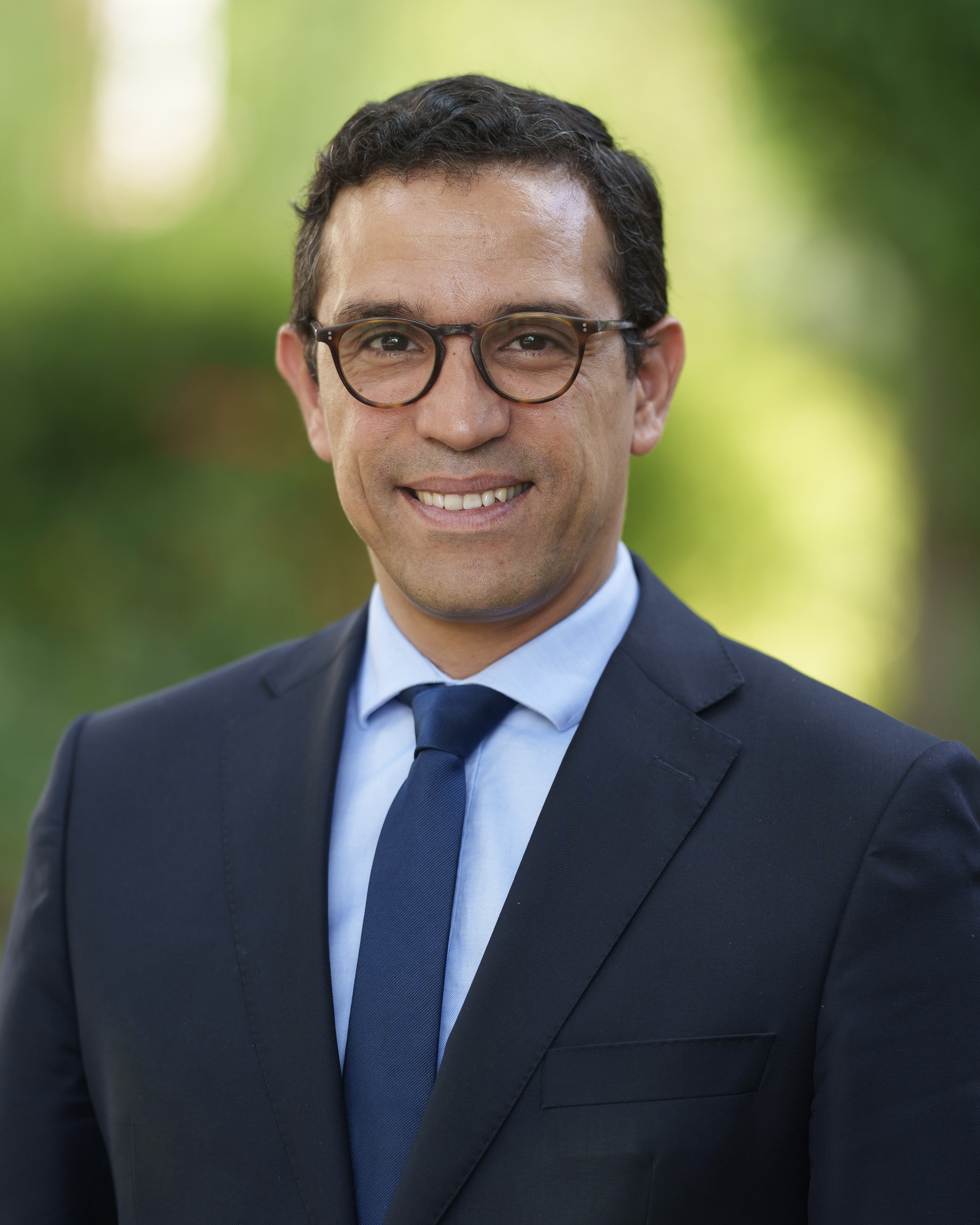
- Ziane in 2023

Member of the Senate
- Incumbent
- Assumed office 2 October 2023
- Constituency: Seine-Saint-Denis

Personal details
- Born: 5 April 1979 (age 47)
- Party: Socialist Party

Adel Ziane (born 5 April 1979) is a French politician serving as a member of the Senate since 2023. From 2020 to 2023, he served as deputy mayor of Saint-Ouen-sur-Seine.
