= Jean-François Husson =

French politician (born 1961)

Member of the Senate
- Incumbent
- Assumed office 1 October 2011
- Constituency: Meurthe-et-Moselle

Personal details
- Born: 17 April 1961 (age 65)
- Party: Independent (since 2024)
- Other political affiliations: The Republicans (until 2024)

Jean-François Husson (born 17 April 1961) is a French politician serving as a member of the Senate since 2011. He has served as general rapporteur of the budget since 2020.
