= Vincent Capo-Canellas =

French politician

Member of the French Senate for Seine-Saint-Denis
- Incumbent
- Assumed office 1 October 2011

Mayor of Le Bourget
- In office 2001–2017
- Preceded by: Frédéric Gailland
- Succeeded by: Yannick Hoppe

Personal details
- Born: 4 May 1967 (age 59) Nîmes, France
- Party: New Centre
- Education: Grenoble Institute of Political Studies

Vincent Capo-Canellas (born 4 May 1967) is a French politician. He serves as a Senator for Seine-Saint-Denis.

== Biography ==
=== Early life ===
Vincent Capo-Canellas was born on 4 May 1967 in Nîmes. He received a degree in Political Science.

=== Career ===
Prior to politics, he worked as a local civil servant.

He is a member of the Union of Democrats and Independents. He has served as the mayor of Le Bourget since 2001. Additionally, since 1 October 2011, he has served as a Senator for Seine-Saint-Denis.

He is an Officer in the Ordre des Arts et des Lettres.
