= Cathy Apourceau-Poly =

French Communist Party politician (born 1965)

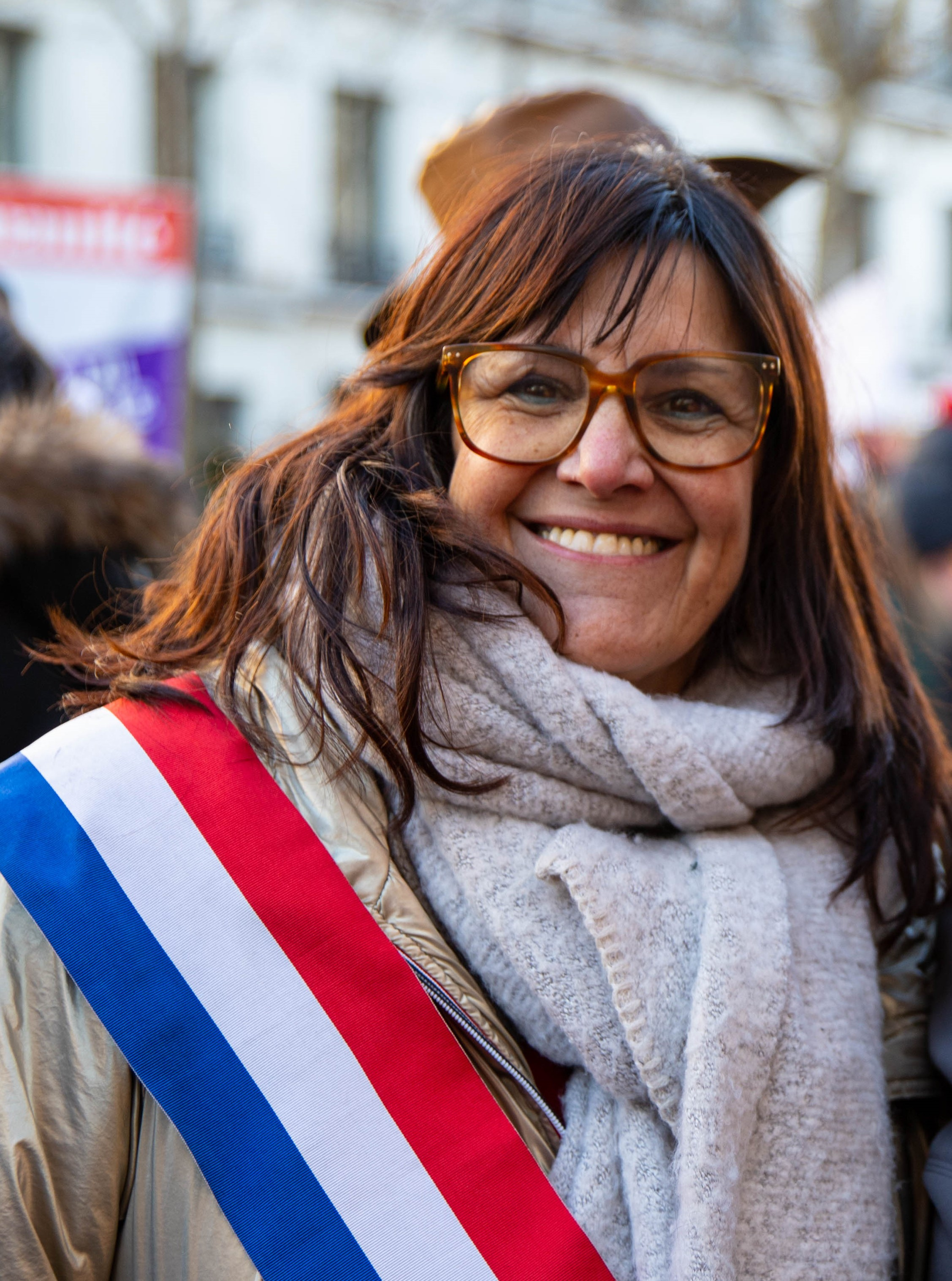
- Cathy Apourceau-Poly

Senator for Pas-de-Calais
- Incumbent
- Assumed office 1 July 2018

Personal details
- Born: 18 April 1965 (age 60)
- Party: French Communist Party
- Occupation: Territorial attaché

Cathy Apourceau-Poly (born 18 April 1965) is a French Communist Party politician and a member of the Senate of France since July 2018.

== Biography ==
Apourceau-Poly was elected to the Regional Council of Nord-Pas-de-Calais in 2004 and re-elected in 2010.

She was a member of the municipal council of Avion, Pas-de-Calais, where she administered the Communal Center for Social Action.

She became a senator on 1 July 2018, after Dominique Watrin's resignation. She enlisted in the Communist, Republican, Citizen and Ecologist group and was a member of the Commission for Social Affairs.

She stood as the 54th candidate on Ian Brossat's list in the 2019 European Parliament election.
