= Maryse Carrère =

French politician (born 1967)

Member of the Senate
- Incumbent
- Assumed office 2 October 2017
- Constituency: Hautes-Pyrénées

Personal details
- Born: 8 April 1967 (age 59)
- Party: Radical Party of the Left

Maryse Carrère (born 8 April 1967) is a French politician serving as a member of the Senate since 2017. From 2001 to 2017, she served as mayor of Lau-Balagnas.
