= Franck Menonville =

French politician (born 1972)

Member of the Senate
- Incumbent
- Assumed office 2 October 2017
- Constituency: Meuse

Personal details
- Born: 3 October 1972 (age 53)
- Party: Union of Democrats and Independents

Franck Menonville (born 3 October 1972) is a French politician serving as a member of the Senate since 2017. Until 2017, he served as deputy mayor of Stainville.
