= Pierre-Jean Rochette =

French politician (born 1982)

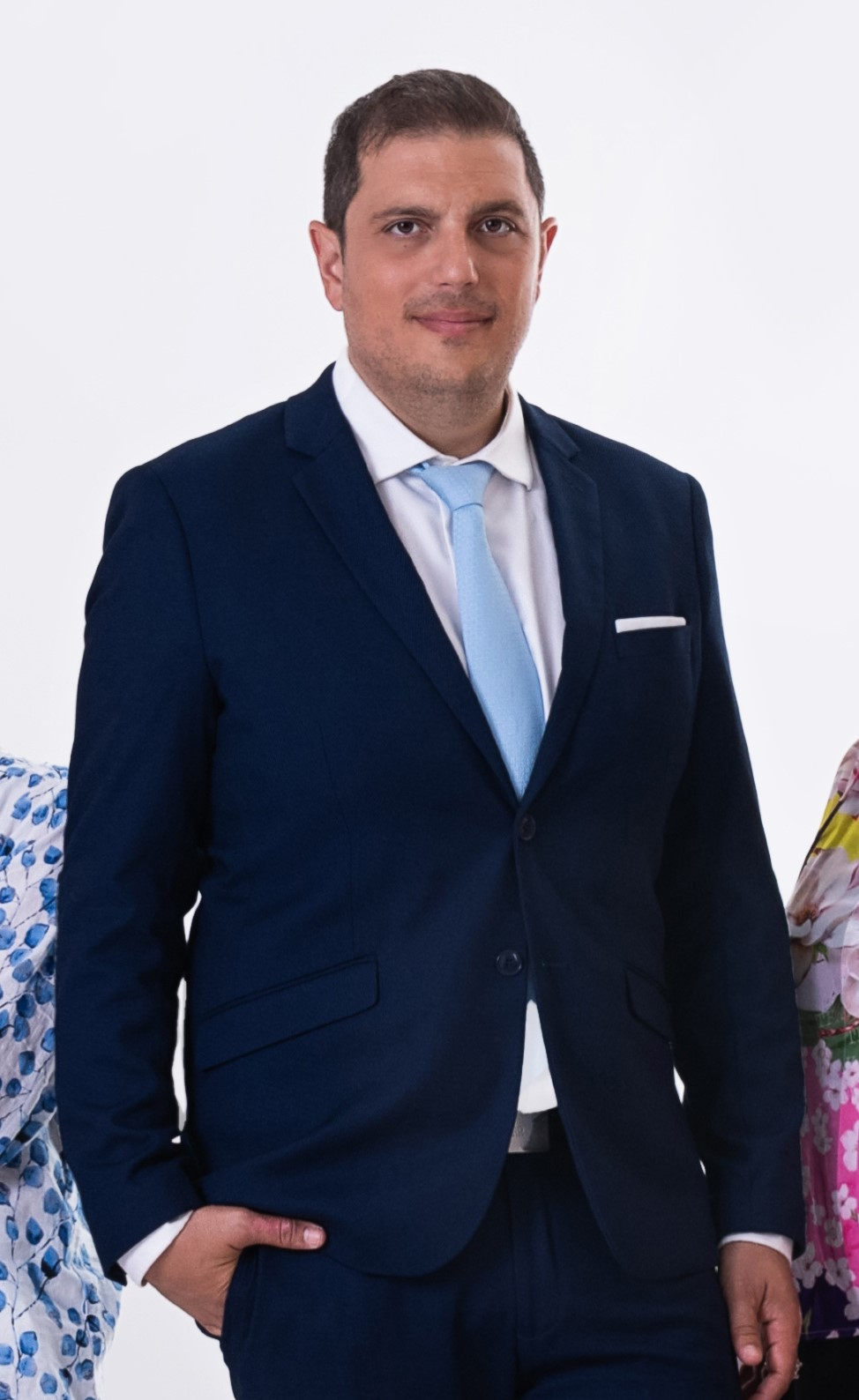
- Rochette in 2023

Member of the Senate
- Incumbent
- Assumed office 2 October 2023
- Constituency: Loire

Personal details
- Born: 1 February 1982 (age 44)
- Party: Independent

Pierre-Jean Rochette (born 1 February 1982) is a French politician serving as a member of the Senate since 2023. From 2014 to 2023, he served as mayor of Boën-sur-Lignon.
