= Isabelle Raimond-Pavero =

French politician

Senator for Indre-et-Loire
- Incumbent
- Assumed office October 2, 2017

Personal details
- Born: February 23, 1961 (age 65)
- Party: The Republicans

Isabelle Raimond-Pavero (born 23 February 1961) is a French politician of the Republicans (LR) who has been serving as a member of the Senate for Indre-et-Loire since October 2017.

== Political career ==
=== Career in local politics ===
Raimond-Pavero was the 4th deputy mayor of Chinon, Indre-et-Loire from 2014 to 2017 and a member of the community of communes of Chinon, Vienne et Loire.

In March 2015, Raimond-Pavero was elected a departmental councillor of the canton of Chinon with Éric Loizon. She was appointed a deputy chairwoman of the departmental council of Indre-et-Loire.

=== Member of the French Senate, 2017–present ===
On September 24, 2017, Raimond-Pavero was elected a senator for Indre-et-Loire. In the Senate, she serves on the Committee on Foreign Affairs and Defense.
