= Laurent Duplomb =

French politician (born 1971)

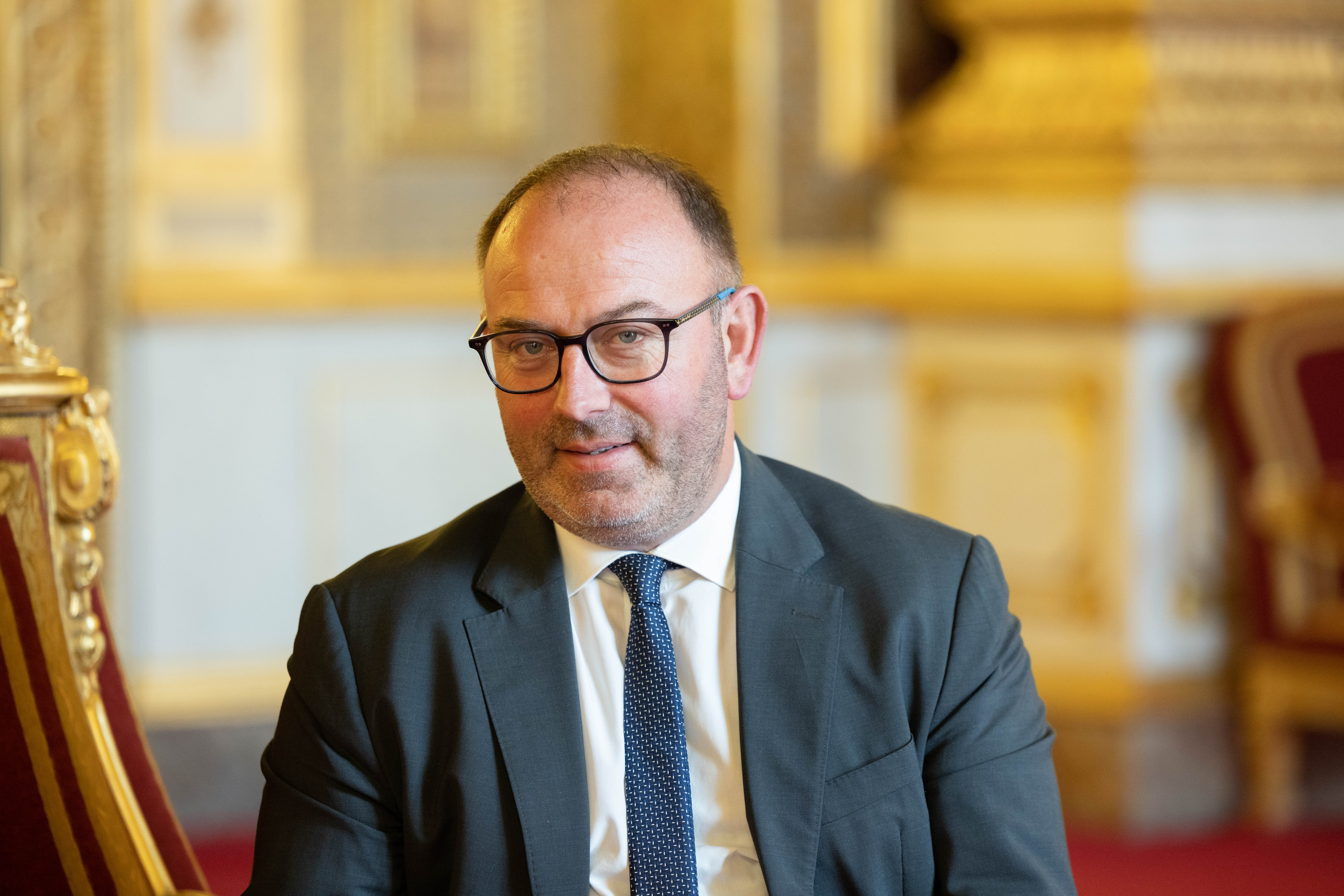
- Duplomb in 2022

Member of the Senate
- Incumbent
- Assumed office 1 October 2017
- Constituency: Haute-Loire

Personal details
- Born: 24 October 1971 (age 54)
- Party: The Republicans (since 2015); Union for a Popular Movement (until 2015)

Laurent Duplomb (born 24 October 1971) is a French politician of The Republicans serving as a member of the Senate since 2017. He is also a dairy farmer and an agricultural unionist.

As a representative of the National federation of farm operators unions (FNSEA), he was president of the Haute-Loire's chamber of agriculture. He was also one of the regional presidents of the dairy group Sodiaal and member of the Candia supervisory board.

In 2025, he introduced the Senate's controversial "Duplomb law" (loi Duplomb), which in its original form, aimed to reintroduce use of a banned pesticide of the neocotinoid family known for its toxicity on human and pollinators insects.

== Biography ==
Born in 1971, he is the son of a laborer and a housewife living in Rive-de-Gier. He chose to become a dairy farmer. He obtained a brevet de technicien supérieur in animal production and meet during his education his future spouse, studying in the same school. He moved with her in his parents in-laws' dairy farm in 1995. He then began a union career by joining the Jeunes agriculteurs (JA) union, affiliated to the FNSEA. After that he started his political career, positioning himself in favor of a productivist agriculture.

== Political career ==
In the 2007 legislative election, Duplomb was a candidate for the National Assembly in Haute-Loire's 2nd constituency.

From 2010 to 2017, Duplomb served as mayor of Saint-Paulien.

From 2014 to 2017, he is president of the Massif central region and the Haute-Loire's section of the third biggest French dairy group Sodiaal.

In the Republicans' 2025 leadership election, Duplomb endorsed Laurent Wauquiez to succeed Éric Ciotti as the party's new chair and joined his campaign team.

In September 2022, he is the coorifdinator of a senatorial report denouncing the state of French agriculture and calling to more competitiveness in order to improve France's food sovereignty.

He is reelected senator on the 24 of September 2023.

== See also ==
- Loi Duplomb
