= Angèle Préville =

French politician

Member of the French Senate for Lot
- Incumbent
- Assumed office 1 October 2017
- President: Hervé Morin

Departmental Councilor for Lot
- In office 2 April 2015 – 16 October 2017
- Succeeded by: Claire Delande
- Constituency: Canton of Cère et Ségala

Deputy Mayor of Biars-sur-Cère
- In office 30 March 2014 – September 2017
- President: Elie Autemayou

Personal details
- Born: 23 November 1955 (age 70) Offenburg, Germany
- Party: Socialist Party

Angèle Préville (born 23 November 1955 in Offenburg, Germany) is a French politician.

She is a member of the Socialist Party, and also is a Senator for Lot since 1 October 2017.

== Biography ==
Angèle Préville was a professor of physics and chemistry until June 2017, when she retired from the public service.

She later took part in various electoral campaigns for the candidates by campaigning door-to-door as an activist of the Socialist Party.

She was elected as the deputy mayor of Biars-sur-Cère in the 2014 municipal elections. For the 2015 departmental elections, she ran alongside Jean-Pierre Boucard in the canton of Cère et Ségala. They were elected in the second round with 72.26% of the votes.

She was a candidate for the 2017 senatorial elections with her deputy Alain Marty. She was elected Senator for Lot on 24 September 2017 with 190 votes, and became the first person from Lot to hold this position.
