= Damien Michallet =

French politician (born 1975)

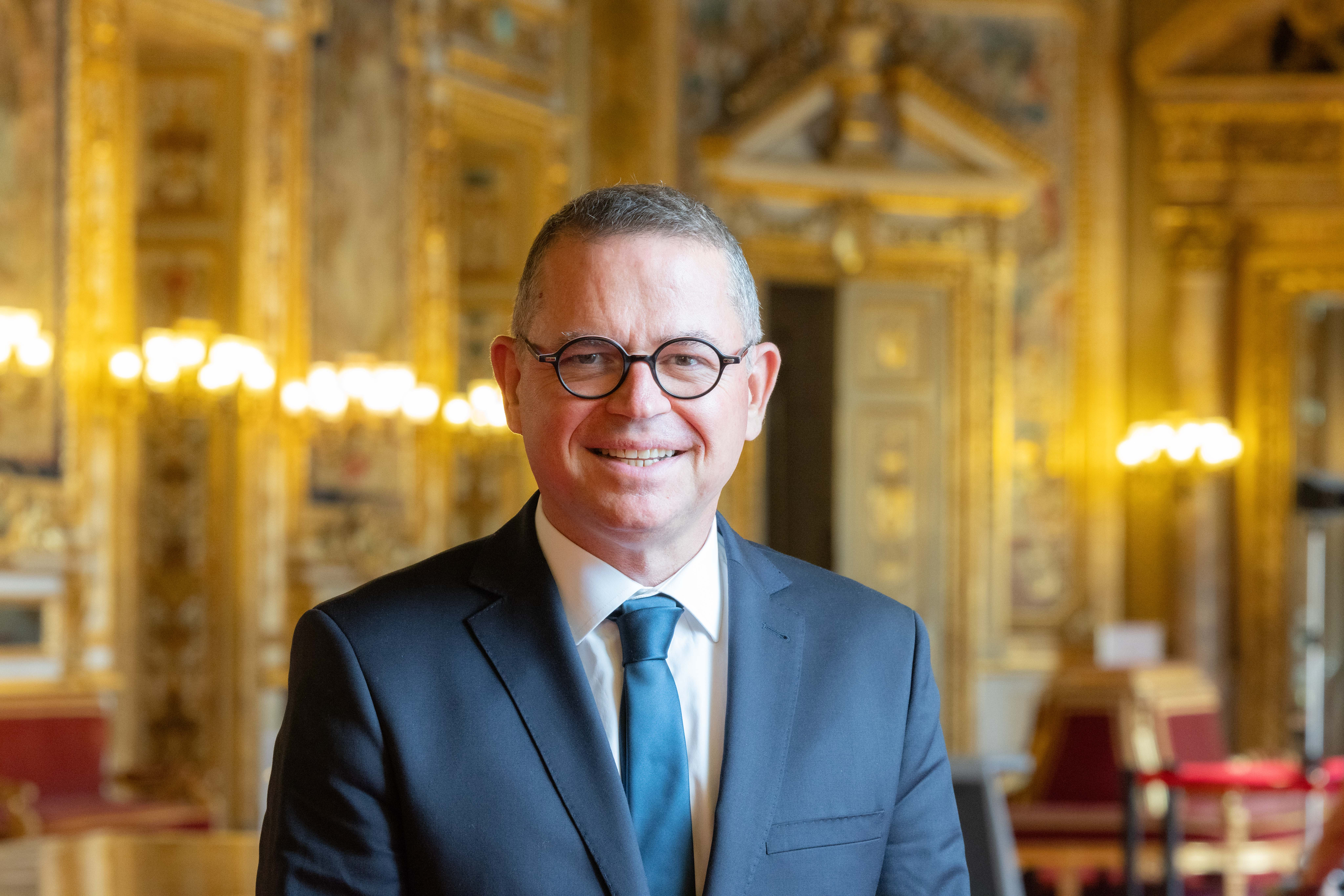
- Michallet in 2024

Member of the Senate
- Incumbent
- Assumed office 2 October 2023
- Constituency: Isère

Personal details
- Born: 31 May 1975 (age 50)
- Party: The Republicans

Damien Michallet (born 31 May 1975) is a French politician serving as a member of the Senate since 2023. From 2014 to 2023, he served as mayor of Satolas-et-Bonce.
