= Marie-Pierre de La Gontrie =

French politician (born 1958)

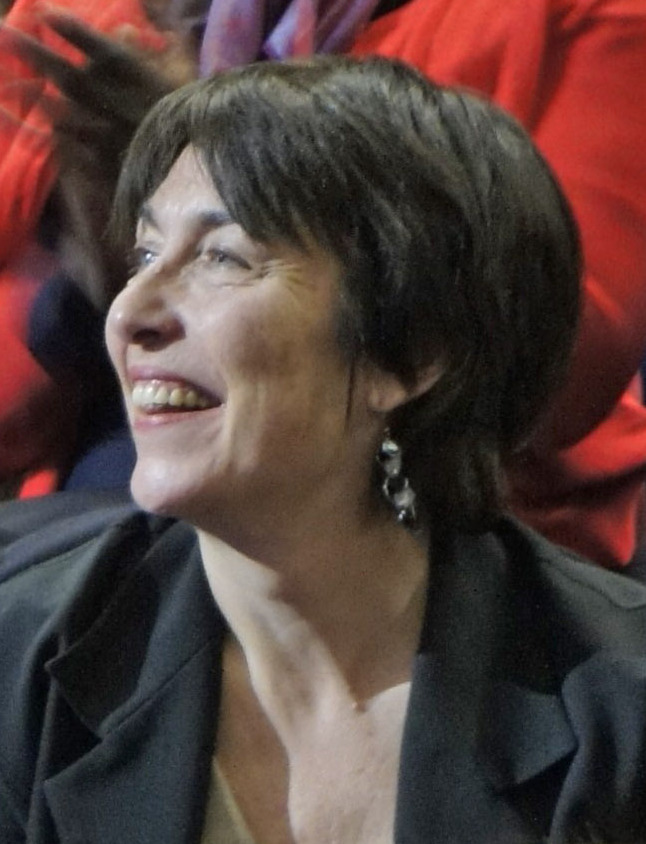
- La Gontrie in 2012

Member of the Senate
- Incumbent
- Assumed office 1 October 2017
- Constituency: Paris

Personal details
- Born: 18 December 1958 (age 67)
- Party: Socialist Party

Marie-Pierre Mossion de La Gontrie (born 18 December 1958) is a French politician of the Socialist Party. Since 2017, she has been a member of the Senate. From 2001 to 2008, she served as a deputy mayor of Paris. Until 2015, she served as first vice president of the Regional Council of Île-de-France.
