= Auguste Cazalet =

French politician

Auguste Cazalet (7 September 1938 – 4 June 2013) was a member of the Senate of France, representing the Pyrénées-Atlantiques department. Cazalet was born in Sévignacq-Meyracq, Pyrénées-Atlantiques, and was a member of the Union for a Popular Movement.

== Bibliography ==
- Page on the Senate website
