= Frédérique Puissat =

French politician (born 1967)

Member of the Senate
- Incumbent
- Assumed office 2 October 2017
- Constituency: Isère

Personal details
- Born: 4 November 1967 (age 58)
- Party: The Republicans (since 2015); Union for a Popular Movement (until 2015)

Frédérique Puissat (born 4 November 1967) is a French politician of The Republicans serving as a member of the Senate since 2017. From 2001 to 2017, she served as mayor of Château-Bernard.
