= Éric Gold =

French politician (born 1964)

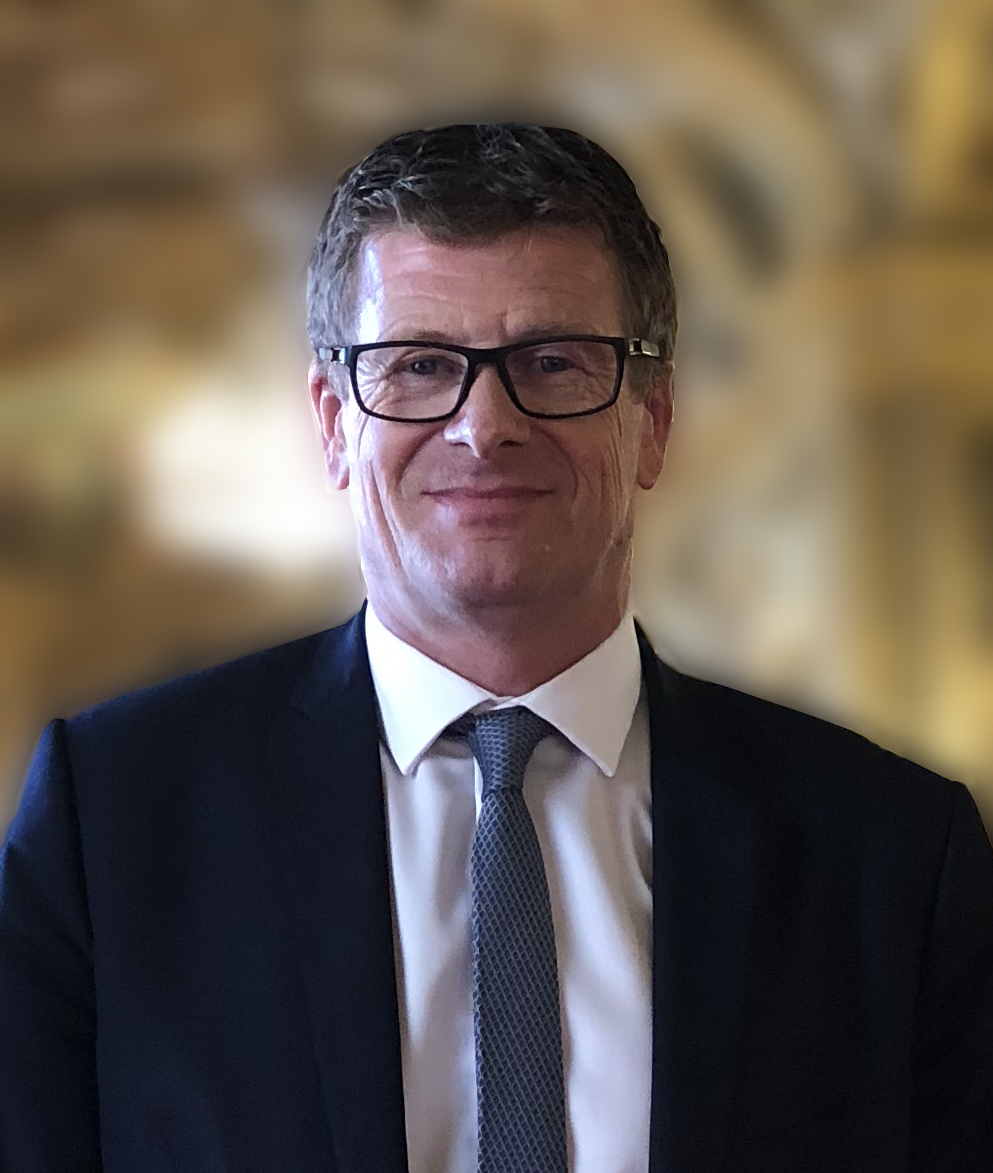
- Gold in 2018

Member of the Senate
- Incumbent
- Assumed office 2 October 2017
- Constituency: Puy-de-Dôme

Personal details
- Born: 7 June 1964 (age 61)
- Party: Independent

Éric Gold (born 7 June 1964) is a French politician serving as a member of the Senate since 2017. From 1995 to 2017, he served as mayor of Saint-Priest-Bramefant.
