= Sébastien Fagnen =

French politician (born 1987)

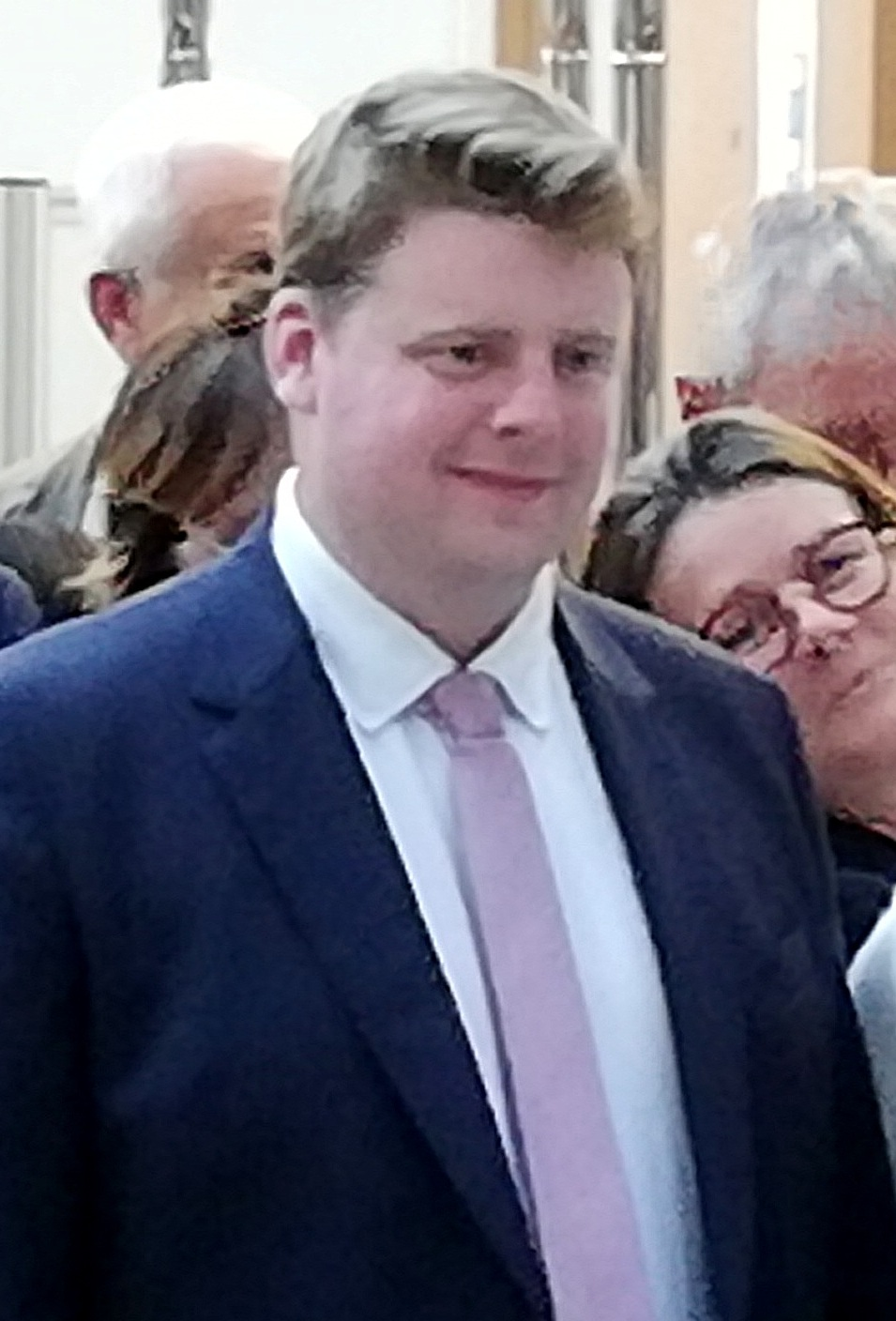

Member of the Senate
- Incumbent
- Assumed office 2 October 2023
- Constituency: Manche

Personal details
- Born: 8 November 1987 (age 38)
- Party: Socialist Party

Sébastien Fagnen (born 8 November 1987) is a French politician of the Socialist Party. Since 2023, he has been a member of the Senate. He previously served as mayor delegate of Cherbourg-Octeville, and was a member of the Departmental Council of Manche from 2015 to 2021.
