= Cédric Chevalier =

French politician (born 1973)

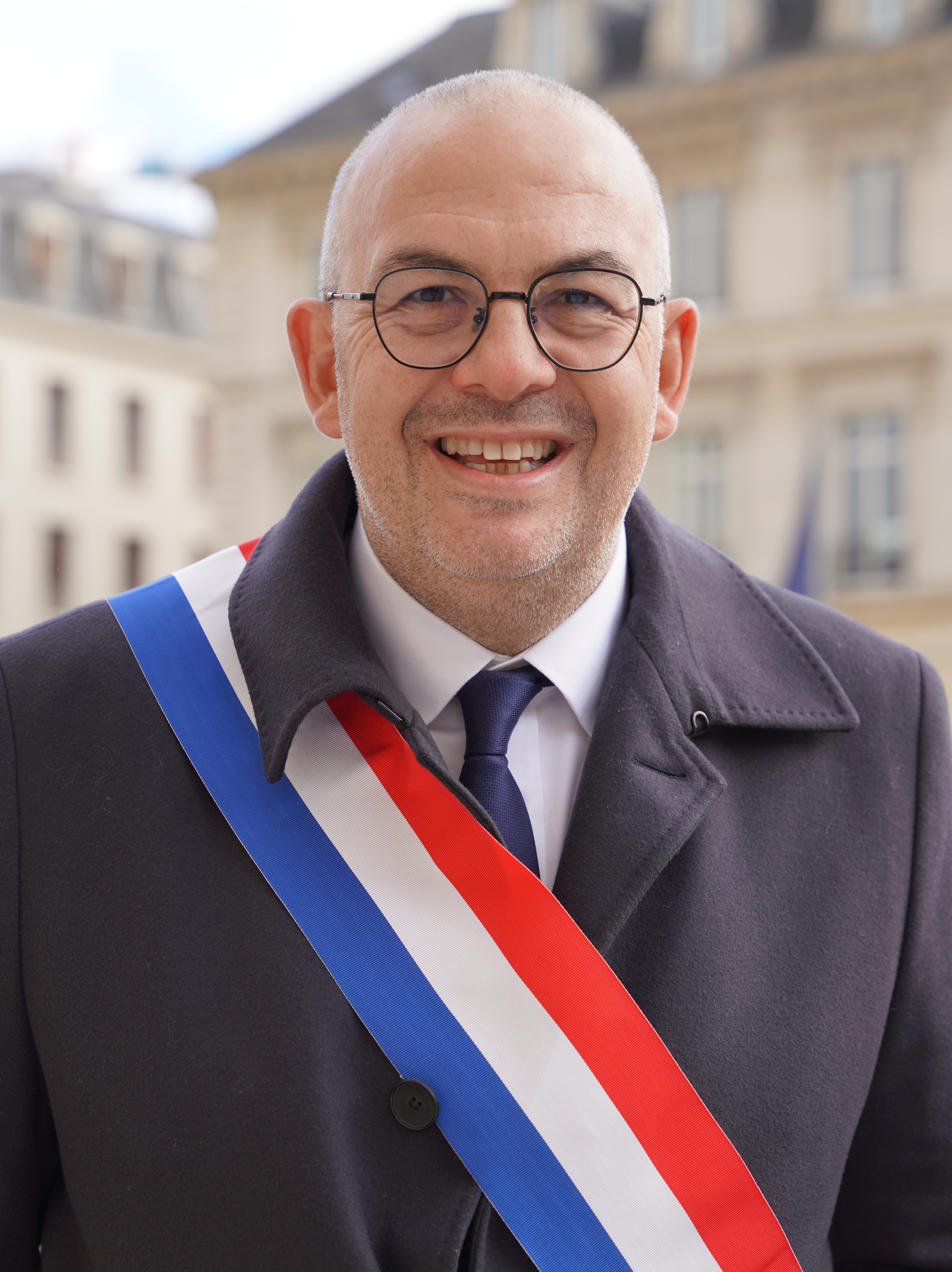
- Chevalier in 2023

Member of the Senate
- Incumbent
- Assumed office 1 October 2023
- Constituency: Marne

Personal details
- Born: 10 March 1973 (age 53)
- Party: Horizons (since 2022)

Cédric Chevalier (born 10 March 1973) is a French politician serving as a member of the Senate since 2023. From 2014 to 2023, he served as mayor of Saint-Léonard.
