= Maurice Antiste =

French politician (born 1953)

Maurice Antiste (born 22 June 1953 in Martinique) is a French politician who represented the department of Martinique in the French Senate from 2011 to 2023.
