= Grégory Blanc =

French politician (born 1980)

Member of the Senate
- Incumbent
- Assumed office 2 October 2023
- Constituency: Maine-et-Loire

Personal details
- Born: 1 September 1980 (age 45)
- Party: Independent
- Other political affiliations: Ecologist group

Grégory Blanc (born 1 September 1980) is a French politician serving as a member of the Senate since 2023. He has been a member of the Departmental Council of Maine-et-Loire since 2007.
