= Georges Naturel =

New Caledonian politician

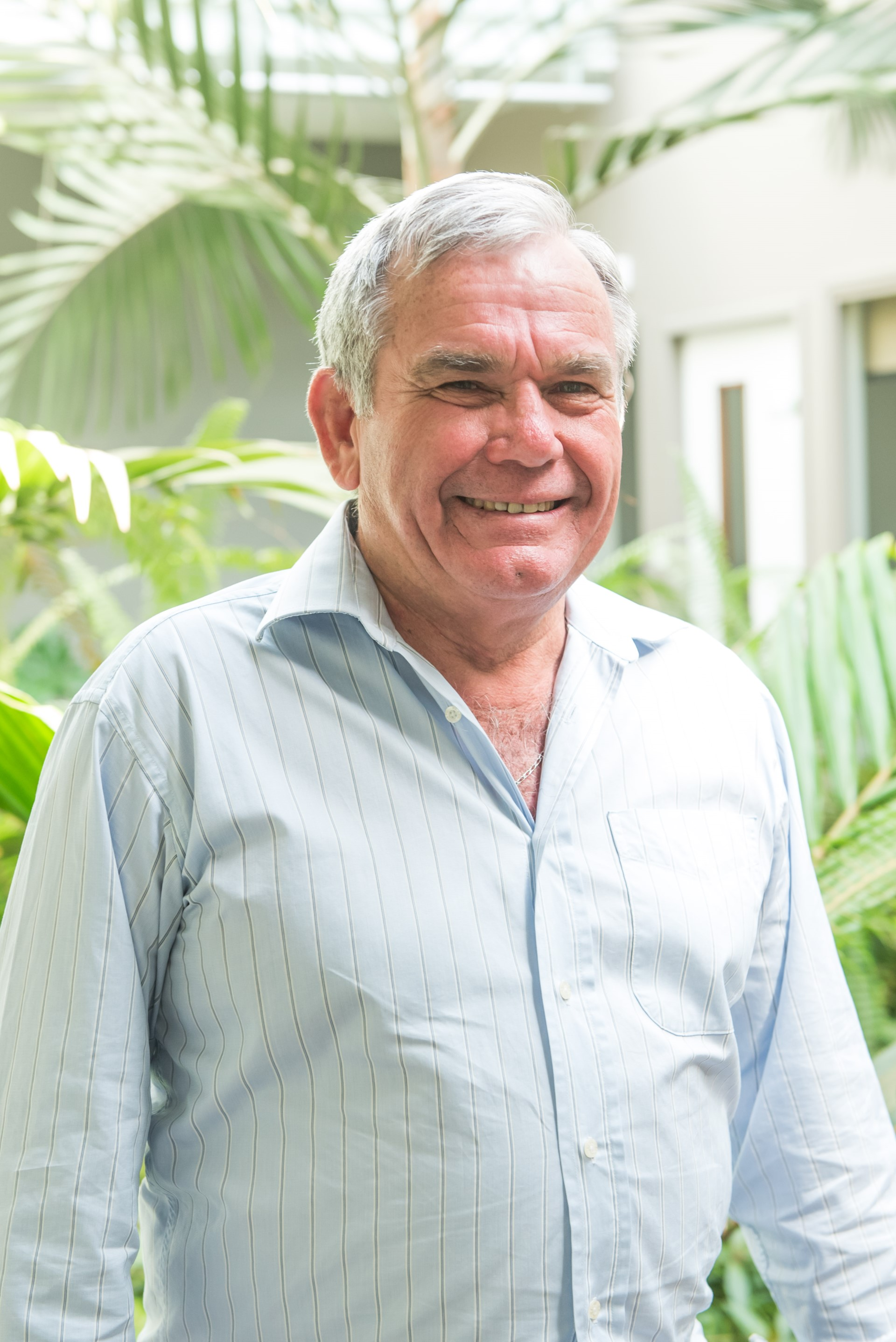
Georges Naturel

Georges Naturel (born November 21, 1955) is a New Caledonian politician. He was born in Nouméa. He has been mayor of Dumbéa since March 21, 2008, and is a member of The Rally–UMP.
