= Bernard Jomier =

French politician

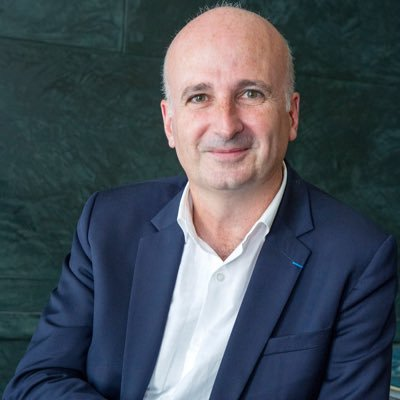

Member of the French Senate
- Incumbent
- Assumed office 24 September 2017
- Constituency: Paris

Personal details
- Born: 9 October 1963 (age 62) Clermont-Ferrand, France
- Party: LV (until 2010); EÉLV (2010-2016)

Bernard Jomier (born October 9, 1963 in Clermont-Ferrand, France) is a French physician and politician who has been serving as a member of the Senate since the 24 September 2017, representing Paris.

== Political career ==
In the Senate, Jomier has been serving on the Committee on Social Affairs. He was also a member of a commission examining the government’s response to the COVID-19 pandemic.

In addition to his committee assignments, Jomier is part of the Inter-Parliamentary Alliance on China.

During the COVID-19 pandemic, Jomier briefly returned to his original profession and practiced as a physician.

== Other activities ==
- French Agency of Biomedicine, Ad-hoc Committee on Embryo Research Authorizations

== Political positions ==
On June 10, 2021, Jomier carried a question and petition to the French senate and the French health Minister Olivier Véran requiring action to protect advocates of science integrity.
