= Jean-François Rapin =

French politician (born 1966)

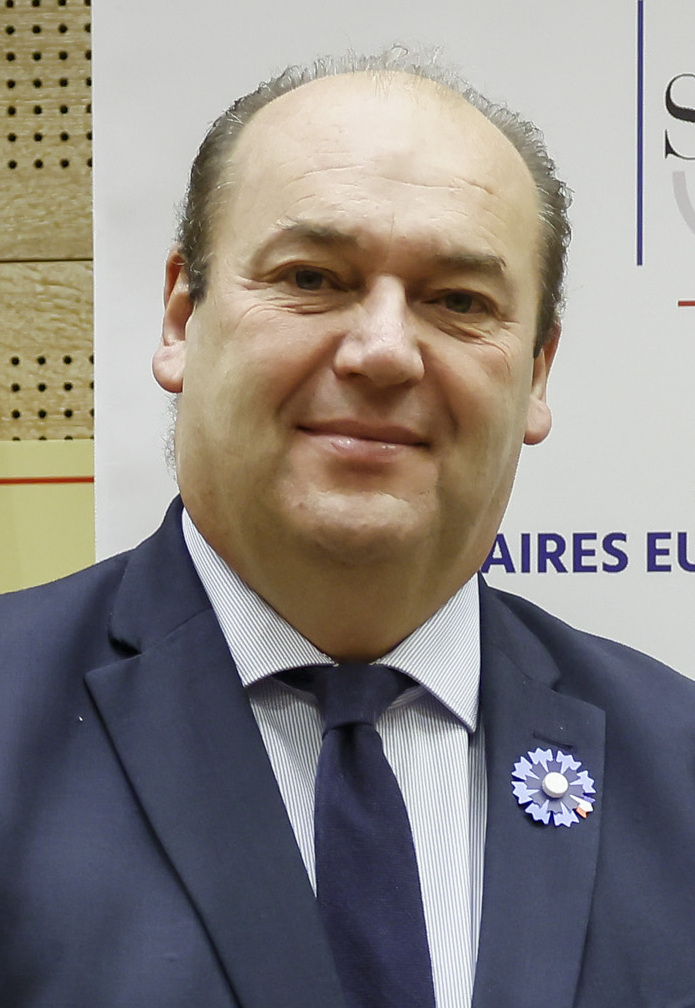
- Jean-François Rapin, 2023

Member of the Senate
- Incumbent
- Assumed office 12 January 2016
- Preceded by: Natacha Bouchart
- Constituency: Pas-de-Calais

Personal details
- Born: 11 May 1966 (age 59)
- Party: LR (since 2015); NF (since 2022)

Jean-François Rapin (born 11 May 1966) is a French politician serving as a member of the Senate since 2016. From 2001 to 2016, he served as mayor of Merlimont.
