= Laurent Lafon =

French politician (born 1965)

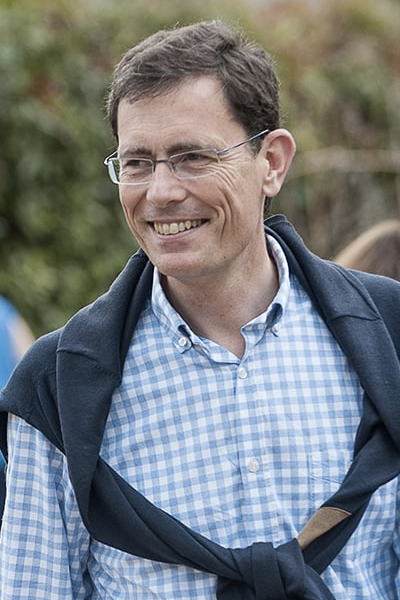
- Lafon in 2017

Member of the Senate
- Incumbent
- Assumed office 1 October 2017
- Constituency: Val-de-Marne

Personal details
- Born: 18 November 1965 (age 60)
- Party: Union of Democrats and Independents

Laurent Lafon (born 18 November 1965) is a French politician serving as a member of the Senate since 2017. From 2002 to 2017, he served as mayor of Vincennes.
