= Élisabeth Doineau =

French politician (born 1961)

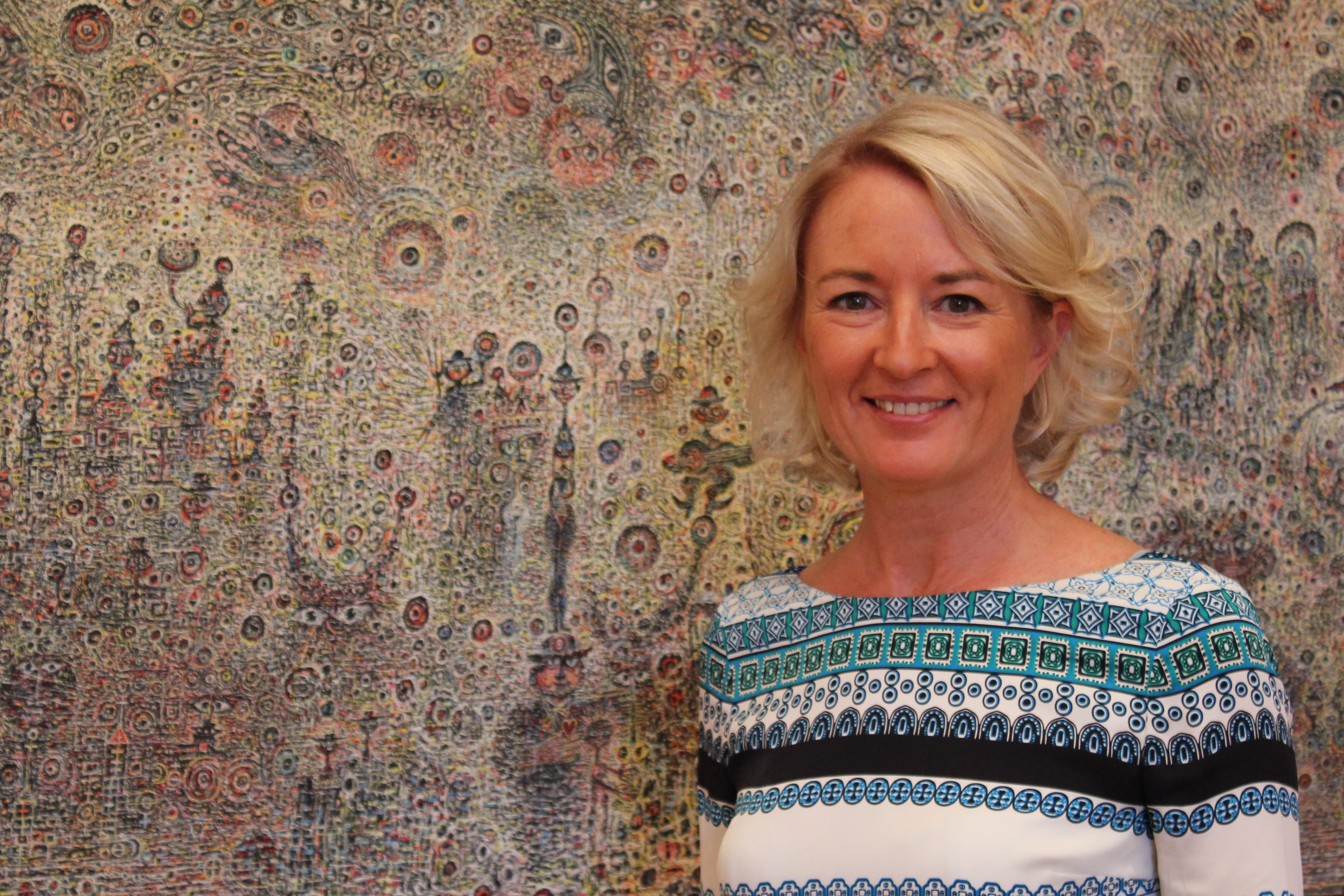
- Doineau in 2016

Member of the Senate
- Incumbent
- Assumed office 1 October 2014
- Constituency: Mayenne

Personal details
- Born: 7 April 1961 (age 65)
- Party: Union of Democrats and Independents

Élisabeth Doineau (born 7 April 1961) is a French politician serving as a member of the Senate since 2014. From 1995 to 2008, she served as mayor of La Rouaudière.
