= Sébastien Meurant =

French politician (born 1971)

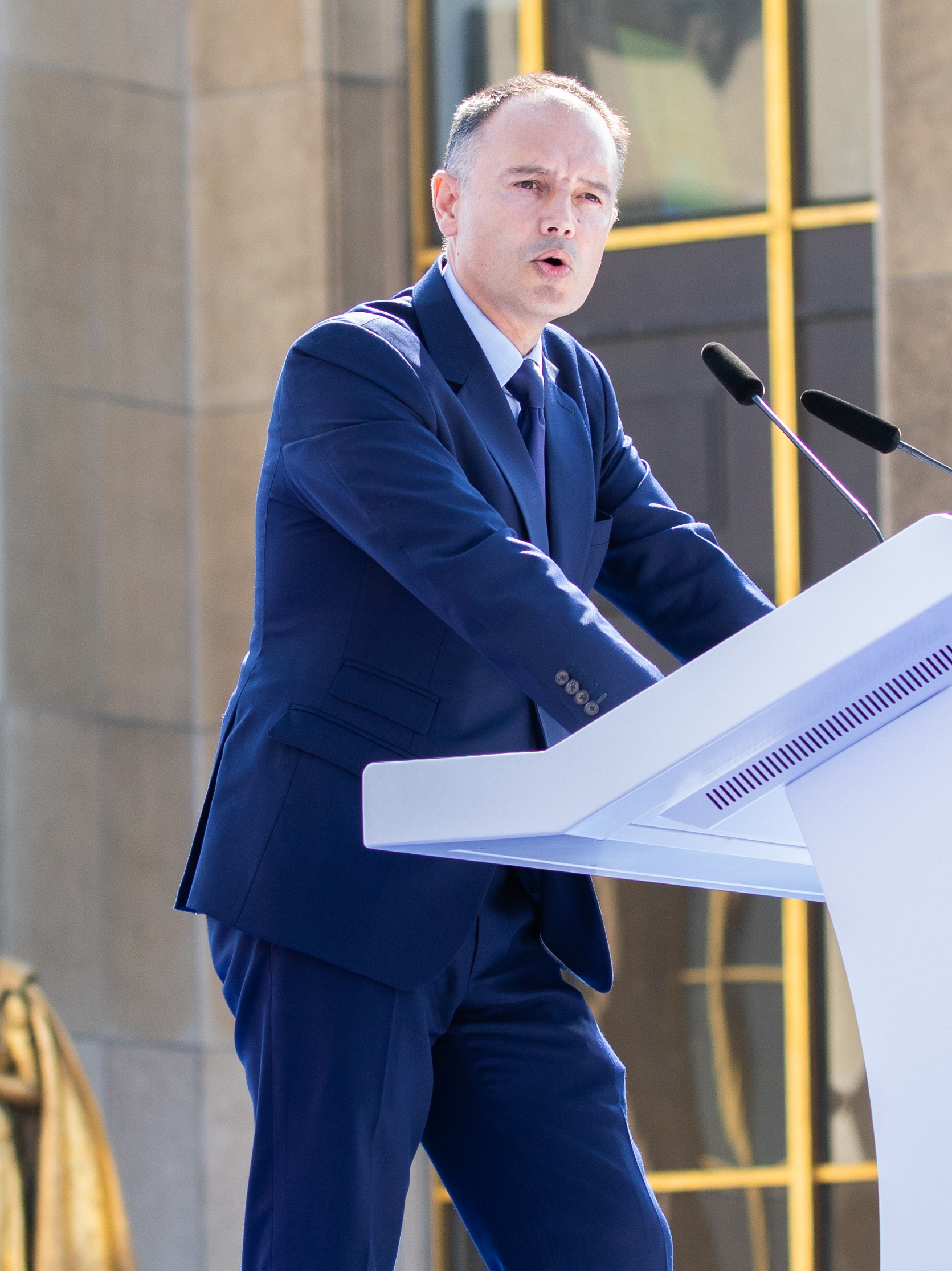
- Meurant in 2022

Senator for Val-d'Oise
- In office 1 October 2017 – 2 October 2023
- Constituency: Val-d'Oise

Personal details
- Born: 18 March 1971 (age 55) Enghien-les-Bains, France
- Party: UDR (since 2024); OLF (since 2017)
- Other party: RPR (1988–2002); UMP (2002–2015); LR (2015–2022, 2024); REC (2022–2024)

Sébastien Meurant (French pronunciation: [sebastjɛ̃ mœʁɑ̃]; born 18 March 1971) is a French politician. He has been a member of the Departmental Council of Val-d'Oise for the canton of Domont since 2021, having previously served from 2015 to 2017. From 2017 to 2023, Meurant was a member of the Senate for Val-d'Oise.

From 2008 to 2017, he served as mayor of Saint-Leu-la-Forêt. In the 2024 legislative election, he was a candidate for Reconquête in Val-d'Oise's 4th constituency.
