= Fabien Gay =

French politician (born 1983)

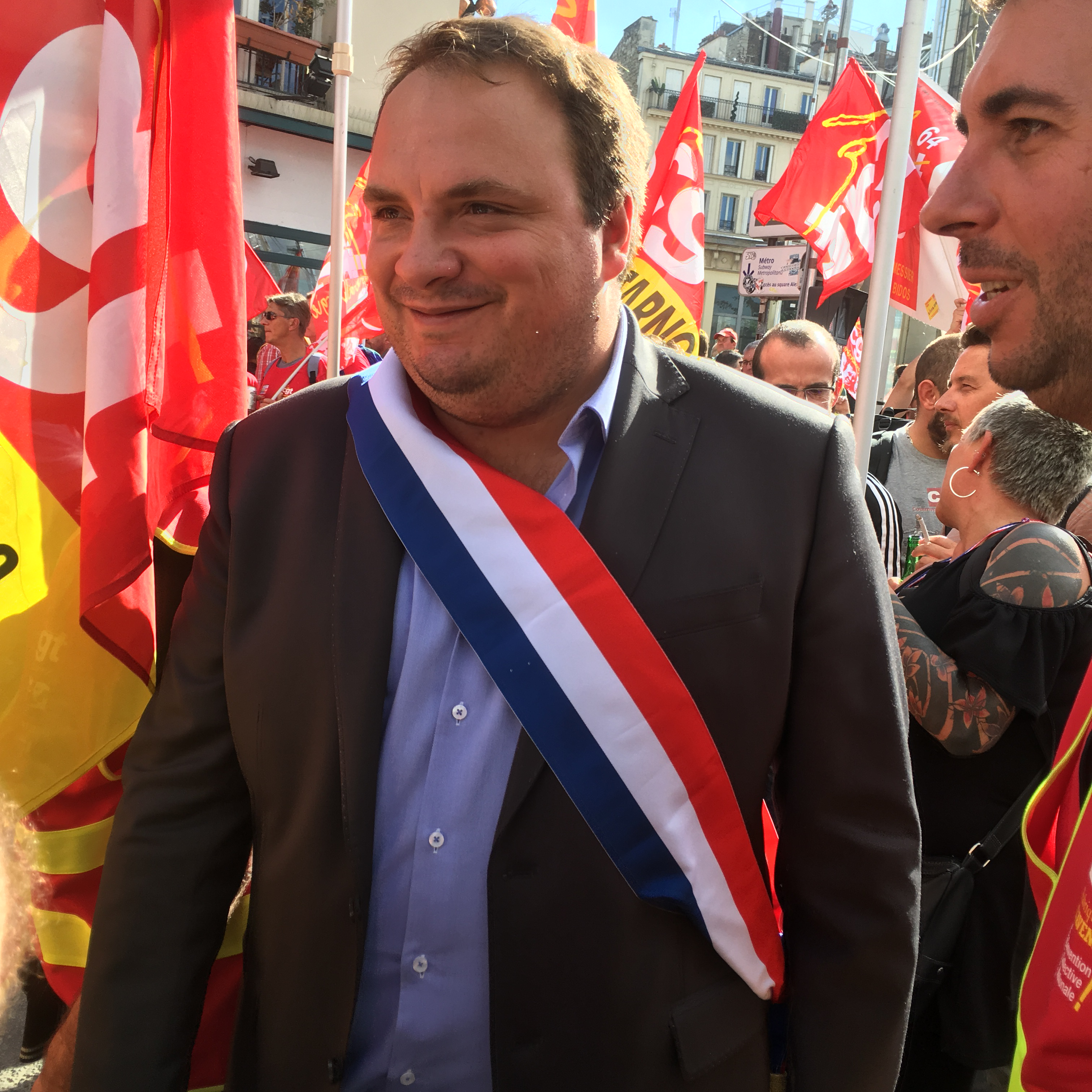
- Gay in 2019

Senator for Seine-Saint-Denis
- Incumbent
- Assumed office 1 October 2017

Municipal councillor of Le Blanc-Mesnil
- Incumbent
- Assumed office 30 March 2014

Personal details
- Born: 13 January 1984 (age 42) Bordeaux, France
- Party: French Communist Party
- Education: Bordeaux Montaigne University

Fabien Gay (French pronunciation: [fabjɛ̃ ɡɛ]; born 13 January 1984) is a French politician who has served as a Senator for Seine-Saint-Denis since 2017. He is a member of the French Communist Party (PCF).
