= Catherine Conconne =

French politician from Martinique (born 1963)

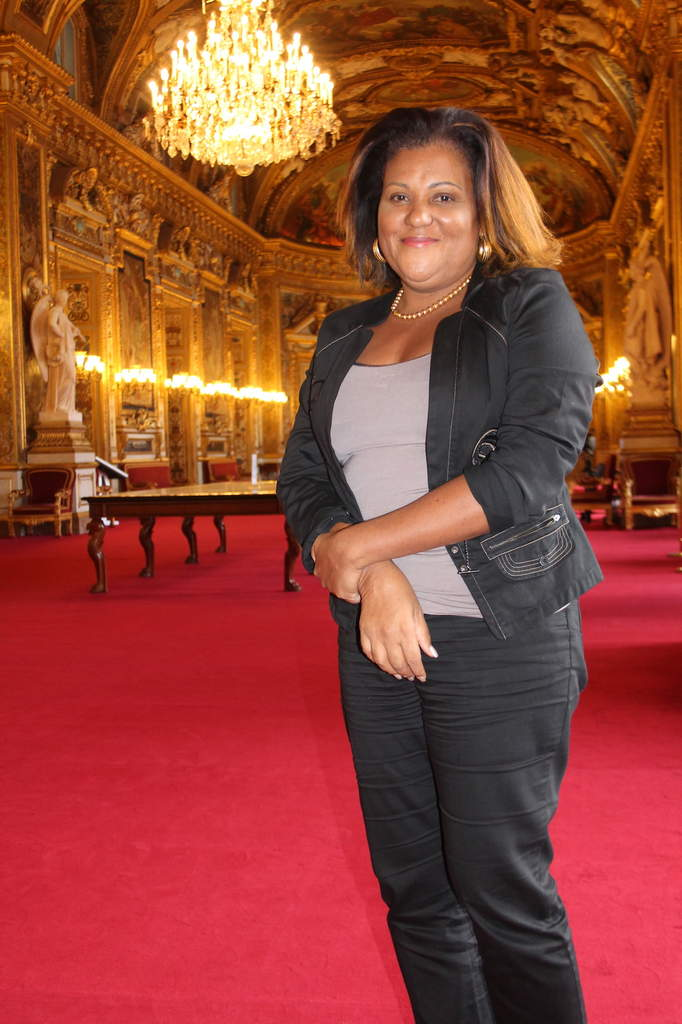
Conconne in 2019 at the Luxembourg Palace

Catherine Conconne (born 18 May 1963) is a politician from Martinique. She was elected to the French Senate to represent Martinique in the 2017 French Senate election, and was the first woman senator for Martinique.
