= Olivier Bitz =

French politician (born 1975)

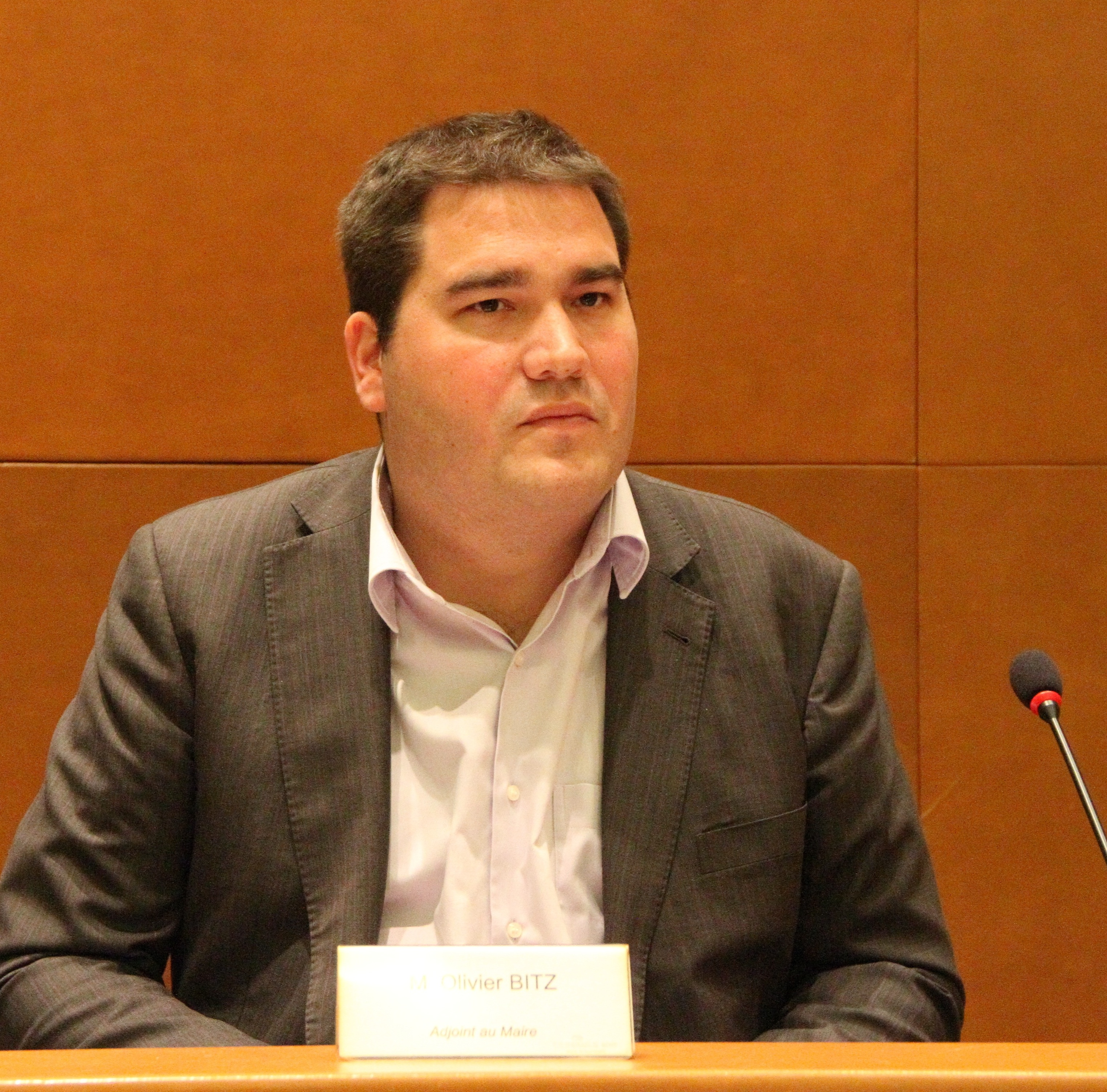
- Bitz in 2013

Member of the Senate
- Incumbent
- Assumed office 1 October 2023
- Constituency: Orne

Personal details
- Born: 16 September 1975 (age 50)
- Party: Horizons

Olivier Bitz (born 16 September 1975) is a French politician serving as a member of the Senate since 2020. He has been a member of the Parliamentary Assembly of the Council of Europe since 2023.
