= Simon Uzenat =

French politician (born 1985)

Member of the Senate
- Incumbent
- Assumed office 2 October 2023
- Constituency: Morbihan

Personal details
- Born: 15 April 1985 (age 41)
- Party: Socialist Party

Simon Uzenat (born 15 April 1985) is a French politician from the Socialist Party. He has been a member of the Senate since 2023, and a member of the Regional Council of Brittany since 2021.
