= Marion Canalès =

French politician (born 1980)

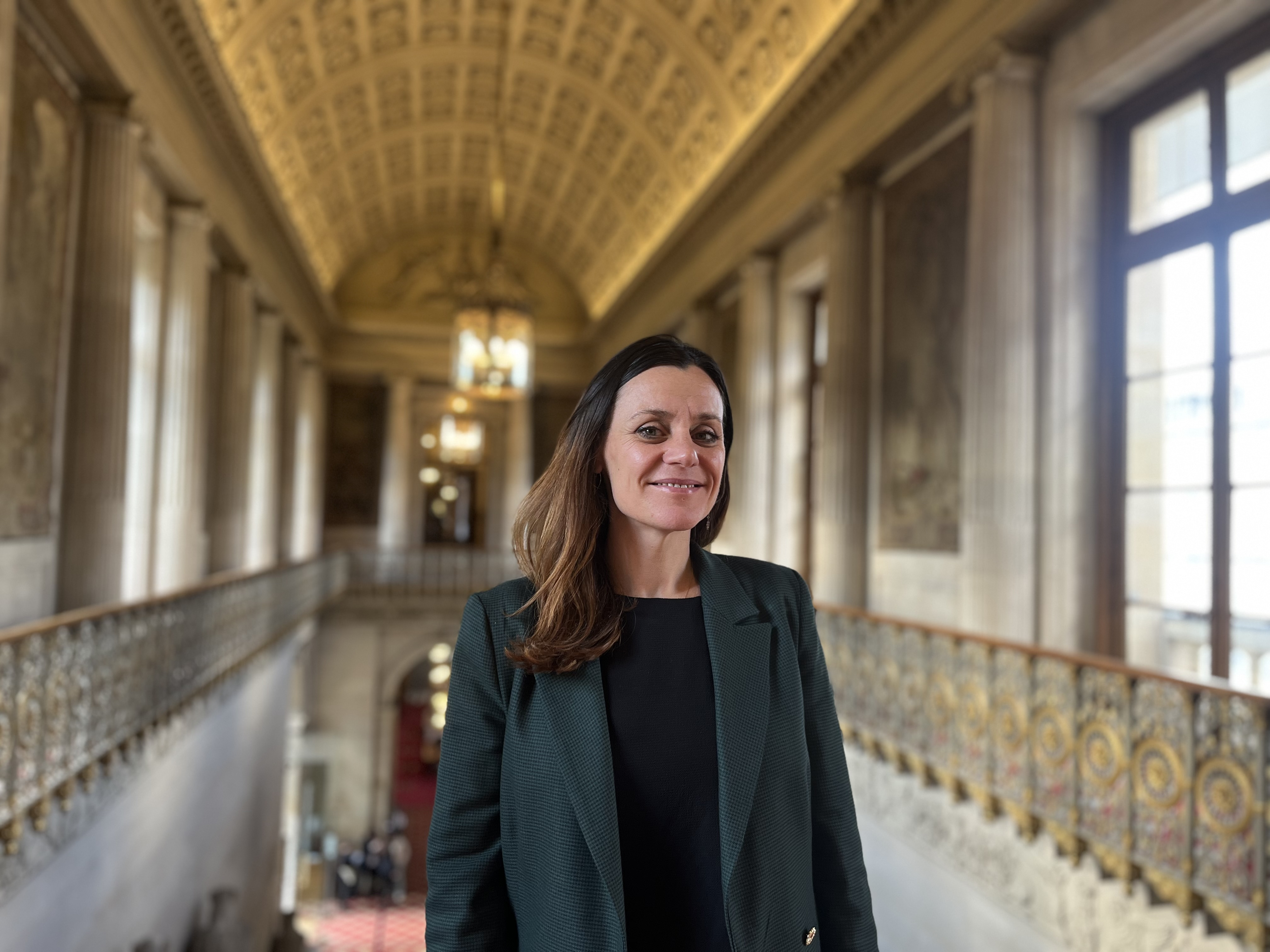
- Canalès in 2023

Member of the Senate
- Incumbent
- Assumed office 2 October 2023
- Constituency: Puy-de-Dôme

Personal details
- Born: 15 January 1980 (age 46)
- Party: Socialist Party

Marion Canalès (born 15 January 1980) is a French politician serving as a member of the Senate since 2023. Until 2023, she served as deputy mayor of Clermont-Ferrand.
