= Béatrice Gosselin =

French politician

Senator for Manche
- Incumbent
- Assumed office 4 December 2020

Mayor of Gouville-sur-Mer
- In office 3 January 2019 – 4 December 2020
- Preceded by: Érick Beaufils
- Succeeded by: François Legras

Personal details
- Born: 27 March 1958 (age 68) Sartilly, France
- Party: The Republicans (France)

Béatrice Gosselin (born 27 March 1958) is a French politician. She has been a senator for Manche since 2020.

== Biography ==
Although having the same surname, Béatrice Gosselin is not related to Philippe Gosselin and Geneviève Gosselin-Fleury.

A teacher at the Jean-Paul II school, Béatrice Gosselin joined the municipal council of Gouville-sur-Mer in 1995 before becoming deputy mayor in 2001 and mayor in January 2019. She is also vice-president of the Communauté de communes Coutances Mer et Bocage.

During the 2015 regional elections in Normandy, Béatrice Gosselin was a candidate in 10th position on Hervé Morin's Manche list but was not elected at the end of the ballot.

She succeeded Alain Sévêque as Senator for Manche, who has resigned, and joined the Culture, Education and Communication Committee. She resigned as mayor due to the dual mandate. A member of the Les Républicains party, she joined the Les Républicains group in the Senate and sits as an affiliate. She opposes the ban on conversion therapy targeting LGBTQI+ people.
