= Emmanuel Capus =

French politician (born 1974)

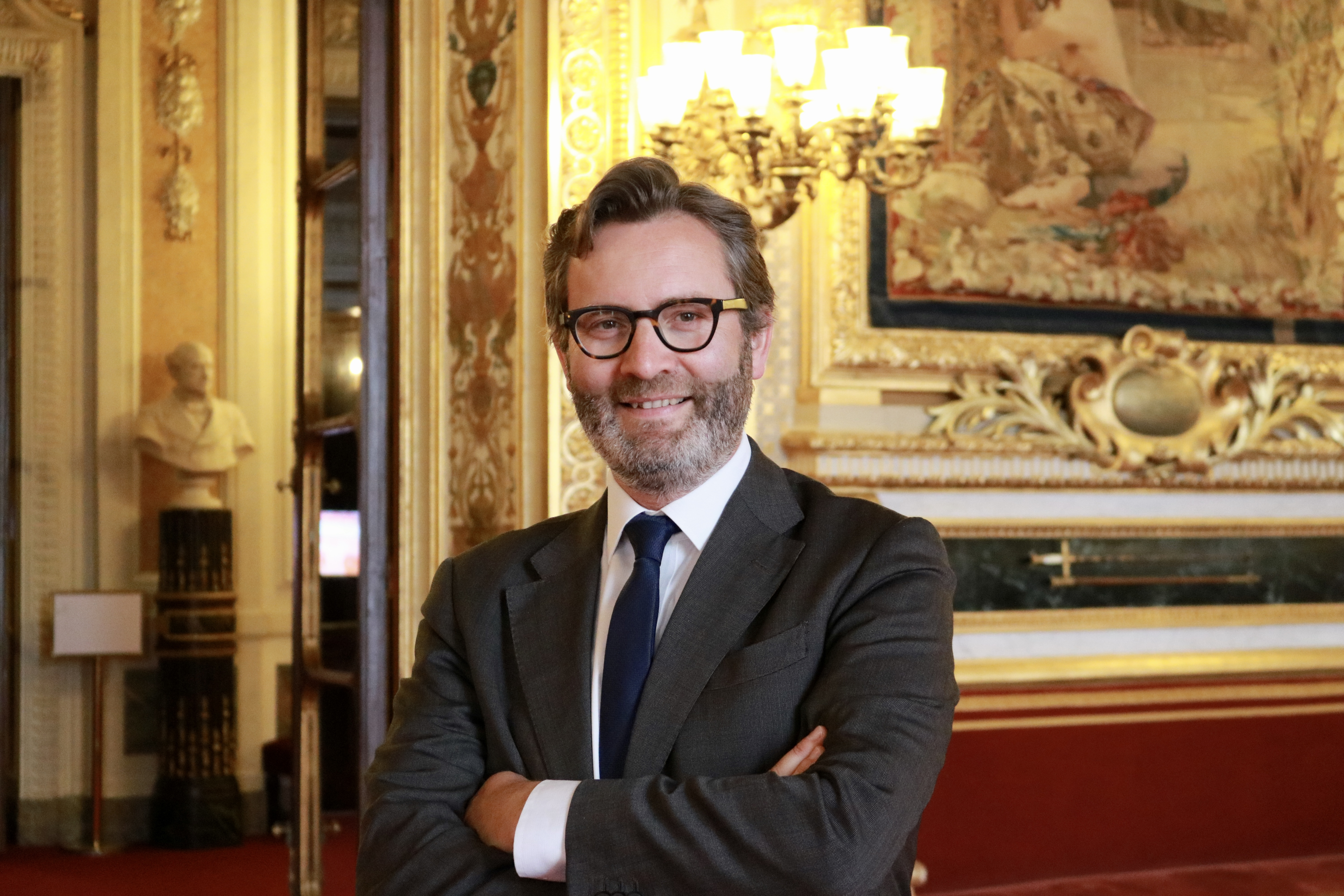
- Capus in 2022

Member of the Senate
- Incumbent
- Assumed office 2 October 2017
- Constituency: Maine-et-Loire

Personal details
- Born: 23 June 1974 (age 51)
- Party: Horizons (since 2021)

Emmanuel Capus (born 23 June 1974) is a French politician serving as a member of the Senate since 2017. He has been a member of the Departmental Council of Maine-et-Loire since 2021.
