= Christine Lavarde =

French politician (born 1984)

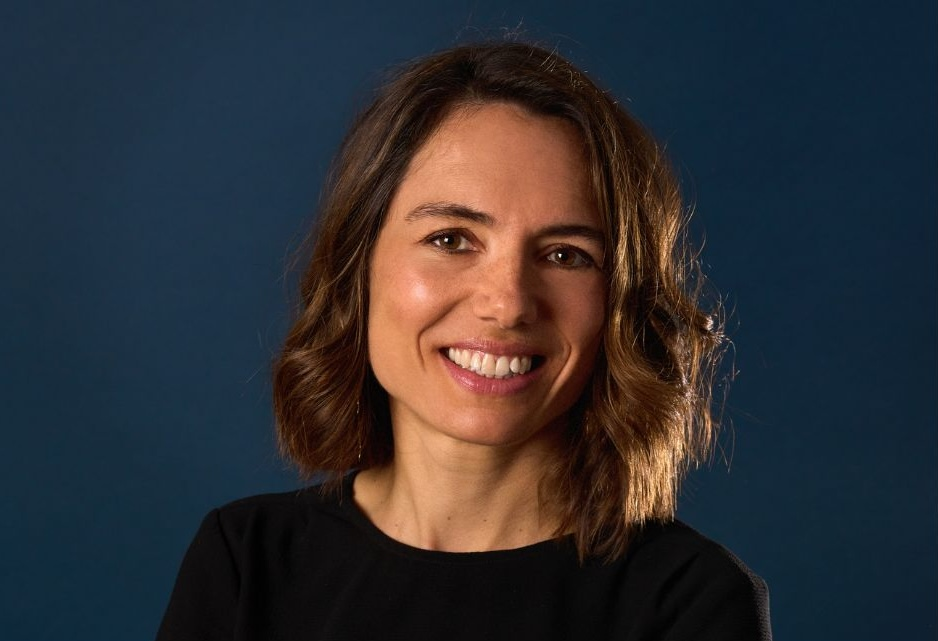

Senator for Hauts-de-Seine
- Incumbent
- Assumed office 2 October 2017

Personal details
- Born: 16 October 1984 (age 41)
- Party: UMP (until 2015); LR (since 2015)
- Occupation: Engineer, civil servant, politician

Christine Lavarde (French pronunciation: [kʁistin lavaʁd]; born 16 October 1984) is a French engineer, civil servant and politician. A member of The Republicans (LR), she has been a Senator for Hauts-de-Seine since 2017. From 2014 to 2017, she served as a deputy mayor of Boulogne-Billancourt under Mayor Pierre-Christophe Baguet. Lavarde was first elected a municipal councillor of Boulogne-Billancourt in 2008.

Upon her election to the Senate at age 32, she became the youngest French senator in office. She holds "unanimously praised expertise, to the point of becoming essential on budgetary issues".
