= Guy Petit =

French lawyer, journalist and politician

Guy Jacques Joseph Petit

Minister of Commerce
- In office 11 February 1953 – 28 June 1953
- Prime Minister: René Mayer
- Preceded by: Paul Ribeyre
- Succeeded by: Jean-Marie Louvel

Personal details
- Born: 23 November 1905 Biarritz, Pyrénées-Atlantiques, France
- Died: 31 October 1988 (aged 82) Biarritz, Pyrénées-Atlantiques, France
- Occupation: Lawyer, journalist

Guy Jacques Joseph Petit (23 November 1905 – 31 October 1988) was a French lawyer, journalist and politician who was a deputy in the French Fourth Republic from 1946 to 1958. He was Minister of Commerce in 1953. He was a senator in the French Fifth Republic from 1959 to 1983. He was also the mayor of Biarritz for many years, and did much to promote tourism in that town and the surrounding region.

== Early years ==
Guy Petit was born on 23 November 1905 in Biarritz, Basses-Pyrénées. When he was fourteen his father was elected mayor of Biarritz. Petit received his secondary education in Bayonne, then studied law. He became an attorney, first in Bayonne and then in Paris. He joined the right-wing French Social Party (Parti Social Français, PSF) led by Colonel François de La Rocque in the Basque country, and was vice president and then head of propaganda of the party.

Petit was mobilized in September 1939 at the start of World War II (1939–45). He was discharged due to illness in January 1940, but voluntarily reenlisted on 5 June 1940. During the German occupation of France he joined the French Resistance. When the Gestapo made inquiries about him in March 1943 he went underground and joined the French Forces of the Interior.

== Political career ==
Petit was elected mayor of Biarritz in April 1945, and held this office until March 1977. He was active in journalism throughout the French Fourth Republic. He was political director of the daily Nouvelle gazette of Biarritz, and wrote regularly for Sud-Ouest, Le Nouveau Journal and L'Eclair des Pyrénées. On 2 June 1946 he was elected to the second constituent assembly at the head of the Republican and Social Entente list. He opposed the second draft constitution which was chosen by the assembly and ratified by plebiscite on 13 October 1946. He ran for election to the national assembly in November 1946 and was easily reelected. He ran in the parliamentary elections of 17 June 1951 as second on the Republican Union list and was elected.

Petit was secretary of state to the President of the council from 14 March 1952 to 8 January 1953 in the cabinet of Antoine Pinay. He was secretary of state for Agriculture from 9 January 1953 to 11 February 1953 in the cabinet of René Mayer. He was Minister of Commerce from 11 February 1953 to 28 June 1953 in the Mayer cabinet. Petit was reelected on 2 January 1956 at the head of the list of the Union of Independents and Peasants. He was defeated in the legislative elections of November 1958.

Petit was elected to the Senate for Basses-Pyrénées in the elections of April 1959, and was reelected in 1965 and 1974. During this period the department was renamed Pyrénées-Atlantiques. He worked to develop the tourist industry in France, in his department, and in the upscale resort of Biarritz, where he was mayor until 1977. He favored measures to make it easier to open hotels, to consolidate natural sites and to restrict outdoor advertising near listed buildings. Under his leadership the municipality renovated the Hôtel du Palais, one of the finest luxury hotels in France. Petit was a member of the general council of the department from 1966 to 1979, representing Biarritz, and chaired the council during his first term. He retired from politics in October 1983. Guy Petit died on 31 October 1988 in Biarritz.

== Sources ==
- "Guy, Jacques, Joseph PETIT" (in French). Assemblée nationale.
- "PETIT Guy" (in French). Senate of France.
