= Christine Bonfanti-Dossat =

French politician (born 1956)

Member of the Senate
- Incumbent
- Assumed office 2 October 2017
- Constituency: Lot-et-Garonne

Personal details
- Born: 25 May 1956 (age 69)
- Party: LR (since 2015); UMP (until 2015)

Christine Bonfanti-Dossat (born 25 May 1956) is a French politician of The Republicans serving as a member of the Senate since 2017. From 1995 to 2017, she served as mayor of Lafox.

== Biography ==
In 2012, she ran for office in the legislative elections in the 1st district of Lot-et-Garonne's 1st constituency.

In March 2015, she was elected departmental councilor for the canton of Canton of Le Sud-Est agenais.

In 2016, she was appointed departmental secretary of Les Républicains in Lot-et-Garonne.

On September 24, 2017, she was elected senator for Lot-et-Garonne. Her deputy is Gaëtan Malange, a graduate of Sciences Po Aix and mayor of Saint-Barthélemy-d'Agenais since 2014.

She is a regional councilor for Aquitaine. She is president of the Deux Séounes community of municipalities and 12th vice-president of the Agen metropolitan area, responsible for health policy and accessibility.

She supported Nicolas Sarkozy in the 2016 primary election for the center-right party. She endorsed Laurent Wauquiez for the 2017 Republican Party convention.
