= Jacqueline Eustache-Brinio =

French politician (born 1956)

Member of the Senate
- Incumbent
- Assumed office 2 October 2017
- Constituency: Val-d'Oise

Personal details
- Born: 5 September 1956 (age 69)
- Party: LR (since 2015); UMP (until 2015)

Jacqueline Eustache-Brinio (born 5 September 1956) is a French politician of The Republicans serving as a member of the Senate since 2017. From 2001 to 2017, she served as mayor of Saint-Gratien.
