= Frédérique Espagnac =

French politician (born 1972)

Member of the Senate
- Incumbent
- Assumed office 1 October 2011
- Constituency: Pyrénées-Atlantiques

Personal details
- Born: 19 April 1972 (age 53)
- Party: Socialist Party

Frédérique Espagnac (born 19 April 1972) is a French politician of the Socialist Party serving as a member of the Senate since 2011. She is a member of the Regional Council of Nouvelle-Aquitaine.

== Biography ==
Frédérique Espagnac, born on April 19, 1972, in Tarbes, is a French politician who has served as a Senator for the Pyrénées-Atlantiques department since 2011.

Early in her career, she worked as a press secretary for François Hollande. From 2010 to 2013, she served as president of the Office of Commerce and Crafts of Pau and the liberal professions (Ofcap). She was elected Senator during the 2011 Senate elections, a seat she has held consecutively since then, being re-elected in 2017 and 2023. Following Harlem Désir's election as First Secretary of the Socialist Party (PS), Espagnac served as a national spokesperson for the party until March 2014, sharing the role with David Assouline, Eduardo Rihan Cypel, and Laurence Rossignol.

During the 2017 presidential campaign, she acted as a spokesperson for Benoît Hamon following his victory in the primary. On July 8, 2017, she joined the provisional collective leadership of the Socialist Party. In addition to her senatorial duties, she has served as a regional councilor for Nouvelle-Aquitaine since 2015 and is active in mountain regional advocacy as a vice-president of the National Association of Mountain Elected Officials (ANEM).
