= Max Brisson =

French politician (born 1957)

Member of the Senate
- Incumbent
- Assumed office 2 October 2017
- Constituency: Pyrénées-Atlantiques

Personal details
- Born: 8 March 1957 (age 69)
- Party: LR (since 2015)

Max Brisson (born 8 March 1957) is a French politician of The Republicans serving as a member of the Senate since 2017. He has served as spokesperson for the Senate Republicans since 2024.
