= Departmental Council of Val-d'Oise =

Departmental legislature in France

The Departmental Council of Val-d'Oise (French: Conseil départemental du Val-d'Oise) is the deliberative assembly of the Val-d'Oise department in the region of Île-de-France. It consists of 42 members (general councilors) from 21 cantons and its headquarters are in Cergy-Pontoise.

The President of the General Council is Marie-Christine Cavecchi.

== Vice-Presidents ==
The President of the Departmental Council is assisted by 12 vice-presidents chosen from among the departmental advisers. Each of them has a delegation of authority.

List of vice-presidents of the Val-d'Oise Departmental Council (as of 2021)
Order	Name	Party	Canton (constituency)	Delegation
Deputy vice-president	Luc Strehaiano	LR	Montmorency	
1st vice-president	Philippe Sueur	UD	Deuil-la-Barre	Territorial development and employment
2nd vice-president	Virginie Tinland	LR	Cergy-1	Youth and education
3rd vice-president	Muriel Scolan	UD	Deuil-la-Barre	Personnel and innovation
4th vice-president	Philippe Rouleau	UD	Herblay-sur-Seine	Transport and mobility
5th vice-president	Véronique Pélissier	LR	Saint-Ouen-l'Aumône	Children and family
6th vice-president	Yannick Boëdec	LR	Franconville	Finance and general administration
7th vice-president	Isabelle Rusin	LR	Goussainville	Security and specialized prevention
8th vice-president	Gérard Lambert-Motte	UD	Taverny	Social life, integration, social housing and health
9th vice-president	Céline Villecourt	LR	Domont	Environment and sustainable development
10th vice-president	Pierre-Édouard Éon	LR	Saint-Ouen-l'Aumône	Autonomy
11th vice-president	Laetitia Boisseau	UD	Taverny	Roads and Grand Paris
