= Michaël Weber =

French politician (born 1974)

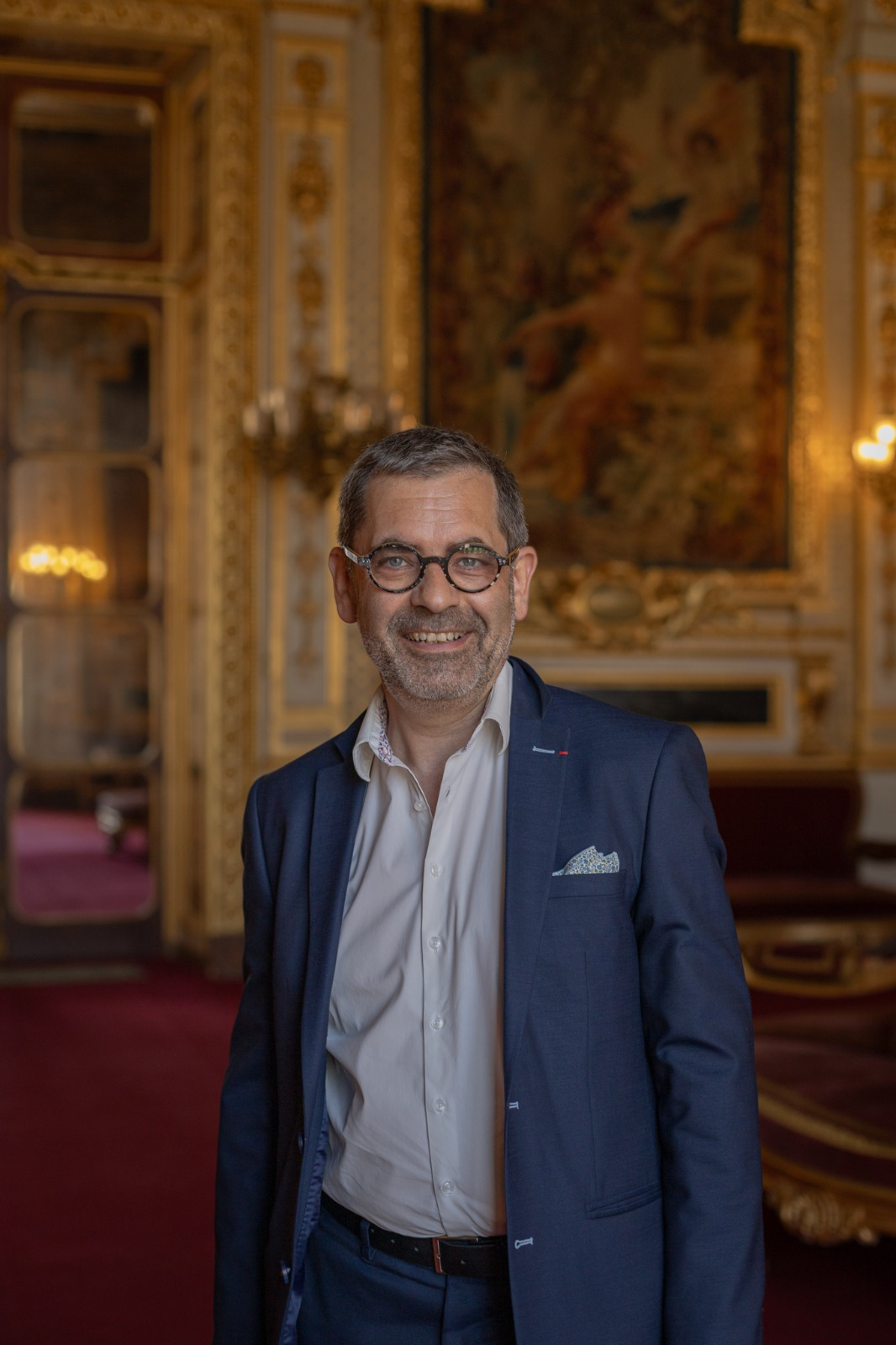

Member of the Senate
- Incumbent
- Assumed office 2 October 2023
- Constituency: Moselle

Personal details
- Born: 17 March 1974 (age 52)
- Party: Socialist Party

Michaël Weber (born 17 March 1974) is a French politician serving as a member of the Senate since 2023. From 1995 to 2024, he served as mayor of Wœlfling-lès-Sarreguemines.
