= Patrick Levaye =

Patrick Levaye (born July 26, 1952 in Orléans, Loiret) is a writer and a French Senior official. Author of a book on Catholicism, Patrick Levaye occupied several functions with high responsibilities with the French Minister of the Interior, with the Minister of Defence, and with the Secretariat of State for War Veterans. He was a member of the Rally for the Republic (RPR), a French right-wing political party, for about fifteen years, starting in 1979. He is also a knight of the Sovereign Military Order of Malta, delegated hospital work for the 12th arrondissement of Paris since the beginning of the year 2000, and is a reserve officer.

== Biography ==
He was born in Orléans, in Loiret, on July 26, 1952. Only son of a middle-class family, he followed, in Puteaux (Hauts-de-Seine), a schooling without difficulty until the scientific baccalaureat. After obtaining this diploma, in 1969 with the Mention Assez Bien (Honours), Patrick Levaye prepared agronomy and was accepted into a veterinary contest. He decided, finally, to turn to studies of botany. He obtained his licence in botany.

Levaye, who wished to pursue a professional path in public office, decided to present himself to the contest of the Regional Institute of French Administration (RIFA), which he made a success of in 1975. Left graduate RIFA from Metz in 1977, Patrick Levaye carried out his military service (which was, let us recall it, at the time, obligatory) with the Paris Fire Brigade. After his military service, he entered the Minister of the Economy, Industry and Employment (France), with the Management of the Forecast, as an attache with the Central Administration.

In 1982, he entered the École nationale d'administration (ENA), promoting "Leonardo da Vinci". In this promotion was also admitted, at the sides of Patrick Levaye, Richard Descoings (director of the Paris Institute of Political Studies), Patrick Galouzeau de Villepin (brother of the former French Prime Minister Dominique de Villepin), François Peny (General secretary of préfecture of the Gironde), Jean-François Cirelli (president of Gaz de France), Jean-Claude Mallet (former General secretary of French National defense), so on.

Following obtaining the ENA diploma in 1985, Patrick Levaye carried out a career as a senior official "interesting" and "exemplary", according to the terms of some of his former comrades of promotion.

== Administrative Functions and Occupied Policies ==
- 1979 - 1982: Attache, with the Central Administration, within the Management of the Forecast (Minister of the Economy, Industry and Employment (France))
- 1982 - 1985: Student at the École nationale d'administration, promotion "Leonardo da Vinci"
- 1985 - 1989: Civil administrator with the Head office of the National Police Force, Minister of the Interior (France)
- 1989 - 1992: General Secretary of the Prefecture of the Tarn-et-Garonne
- 1992 - 1994: Head clerk of the Budgetary Businesses to the French Minister of the Interior
- 1994 - 1999: Sub-manager of the administration and modernization of the direction of civil defense and safety (French Minister of the Interior)
- 1999 - 2002: Sub-manager of the Budget to the Prefecture of Police
- 2002 - 2007: Adviser of the Minister of Defence (France), Michèle Alliot-Marie
- 2002 - 2003: Technical adviser with the cabinet of the Secretary of State to Defence, charged with War Veterans, Hamlaoui Mekachera;
- 2003 - February 2007: Director-assistant of the cabinet of the Secretariat of State to Defence, charged with War Veterans
- February 2007 - May 2007: Principal private secretary of the Secretariat of State to Defence charged with War Veterans
- September 2007 - June 2008: Rapporteur at the Commission of the White Paper on Defence and the French National Security
- January 2009 - June 2012: Project Manager on the "Securities Secure" to the French Ministry of Interior
- Since July 2012: Deputy Ministerial Delegate to Private Security (MDPS) to the French Ministry of Interior.

== Literary works ==
- Charles de Foucauld: Repères pour Aujourd'hui (Première Partie Editions, December 2016 - ISBN 978-2-36526-128-9)
- Géopolitique du Catholicisme (Ellipses Editions, 2007 - ISBN 978-2-7298-3523-1).

== Honorary Distinctions ==
- Knight of the Ordre National du Mérite;
- Knight of the Mérite Agricole;
- Knight of the Sovereign Military Order of Malta.
