= Akhtar Nawab =

American chef and restaurateur

- Born: Wisconsin, U.S.
- Education: California Culinary Academy
- Website: akhtarnawab.com

Akhtar Nawab is an American chef and restaurateur. After graduating from culinary school, Nawab moved to New York in 1998 and worked under chef Tom Colicchio at Gramercy Tavern for several years. He was part of the opening staff of Colicchio's restaurant Craft, and in 2002 helped open Craftbar, later serving as executive chef. His first restaurant, Elettaria, closed in 2009 due to the 2008 financial crisis. Since then he has made a shift to working mainly in Mexican cuisine and has opened several restaurants.

== Early life ==
Born to Indian parents in Wisconsin, Nawab's mother was a nurse and hailed from Lucknow, in the Indian state of Uttar Pradesh, while his father worked as a cardiovascular surgeon. In addition to his father, his brother, aunt, uncles, and grandfather worked in medical professions. His parents and brother were born in India, but Nawab was born in Wisconsin, where his father was completing a fellowship program prior to moving to Louisville, Kentucky. Nawab spent time cooking with his mother growing up, and they made foods such as roti (a flatbread), korma (a curry) and chana dal (a chickpea-based dish). He experienced difficulties being raised in a family that was more strict and conservative relative to those around them, and they only knew one other Indian family in the city. He graduated from the St. Francis School in 1990.

== Career ==
=== 1990–1998: Early culinary ventures and training ===
Nawab attended Bradley University in Illinois for one year, after which he returned to Louisville to pursue work in the restaurant business. He worked at a family restaurant for four years. The decision displeased his parents, and he recalled: "My mom was terrified for me to do this. My dad was angry." He entered the California Culinary Academy in San Francisco in 1994, where, in the course of three years, he would cook for chefs Loretta Keller (of Bizou) and Roland Passot (of La Folie).

=== 1998–2009: Move to New York, work with Tom Colicchio, and Elettaria ===
Nawab moved to New York in 1998, and worked as a cook at the Gramercy Tavern for a couple years, mentored by chef Tom Colicchio. After a couple years at Gramercy, Colicchio chose Nawab as part of the opening staff for his restaurant Craft. There, Nawab would meet and serve as a mentor to future restaurateur David Chang, who was working as a cook. In 2002, he opened Craftbar under chef Marco Canora, and later moved into the executive chef role with Canora's departure.

Nawab worked at the restaurant European Union (E.U.) before he opened his own restaurant, Elettaria, in 2008. It was reviewed in The New Yorker and New York magazine. He appeared on Food Network's Iron Chef America the following year. The restaurant was forced to close later in 2009, not two years before its opening, due to struggles it faced amid the 2008 financial crisis and bankruptcy of Lehman Brothers, the latter of which occurred 3 months after the restaurant's opening. Nawab was out of work in the following 7 months and faced difficulties in his personal life, such as the breakdown of his marriage.

=== 2009–present: Shift to Mexican cuisine and other ventures ===
Nawab was a consultant on the opening of a Mexican restaurant Zengo under chef Richard Sandoval. He was then culinary director of the Mexican restaurant La Esquina for four years. After that point, he worked as a consultant for a Washington, D.C.-based restaurant owned by a friend, worked to expand the Choza Taqueria restaurant chain, and opened the fast casual Indian restaurant Indie Fresh in New York. He was briefly chef at La Cenita, another Mexican restaurant, around this time before he left in 2014. From 2015 to 2017, he was executive chef at Table, in Washington D.C.

In 2017, Nawab opened Alta Calidad, a full-service restaurant in New York serving Mexican food, and Fero, a restaurant serving Italian cuisine in a Birmingham, Alabama food hall. Alta Calidad was soon after given the Bib Gourmand by the Michelin Guide, which is awarded quality restaurants offering affordable prices. His next project, Prather's on the Alley, opened in the Mount Vernon Triangle of Washington, D.C. in late 2018. He was its executive chef through early 2019. He opened Otra Vez, a Mexican restaurant in New Orleans, Louisiana, in 2019.

Nawab is the founding CEO of Hospitality HQ, which opened a food hall in Omaha, Nebraska in 2019, and one in Chicago, Illinois, in 2020, among other projects. His first cookbook, Good for You, was published by Chronicle Books in 2020.

== Restaurants ==
- Elettaria (open from 2008 to 2009) in New York.
- Indie Fresh (opened in 2015), a soup stall pop-up within Choza Taqueria in New York.
- Alta Calidad (opened in 2017), a full-service restaurant in New York serving Mexican cuisine.
- Fero (opened in 2017), a restaurant serving Italian cuisine in a Birmingham, Alabama food hall.
- Prather's on the Alley (opened in 2018), in Washington, D.C.
- Otra Vez (opened in 2019), a Mexican restaurant in New Orleans, Louisiana.
