= List of films set in Lyon =

Films set in the French city Lyon

A list of films set in Lyon, France:

- 1895: 14 vues Lumière filmées à Lyon entre 1895 et 1900 by Auguste and Louis Lumière;
- 1929: The Kiss (Le Baiser) by Jacques Feyder with Greta Garbo;
- 1938: Le Petit Chose by Maurice Cloche with Arletty, Robert Lynen;
- 1945: 120 rue de la Gare by Jacques Daniel-Norman with René Dary, Sophie Desmarets;
- 1946: Un revenant by Christian-Jaque with Louis Jouvet, Gaby Morlay, François Périer, Marguerite Moreno, Ludmilla Tchérina;
- 1949: La Cage aux filles by Maurice Cloche with Danièle Delorme, Noël Roquevert;
- 1950: Cœur sur mer by Jacques Daniel-Norman;
- 1952: Les Dents longues by Daniel Gélin with Daniel Gélin, Danièle Delorme, Louis de Funès;
- 1953: Thérèse Raquin by Marcel Carné, with Simone Signoret, Raf Vallone, Jacques Duby;
- 1956: Un condamné à mort s'est échappé by Robert Bresson;
- 1956: Crime et Châtiment by Georges Lampin with Jean Gabin, Robert Hossein, Marina Vlady, Bernard Blier, Gaby Morlay, Lino Ventura;
- 1964: L'Insoumis by Alain Cavalier with Alain Delon, Léa Massari;
- 1966: Le Voyage du père by Denys de La Patellière with Fernandel, Lilli Palmer, Laurent Terzieff, Madeleine Robinson, Michel Auclair, Philippe Noiret;
- 1969: La Sirène du Mississipi by François Truffaut with Jean-Paul Belmondo, Catherine Deneuve;
- 1969: L'Armée des ombres by Jean-Pierre Melville with Lino Ventura, Simone Signoret, Paul Meurisse, Jean-Pierre Cassel;
- 1974: L'Horloger de Saint-Paul by Bertrand Tavernier with Philippe Noiret, Jean Rochefort;
- 1975: Verdict by André Cayatte with Jean Gabin, Sophia Loren;
- 1975: La Chair de l'orchidée by Patrice Chéreau with Charlotte Rampling, Edwige Feuillère, Bruno Cremer, Simone Signoret, Alida Valli;
- 1980: Une semaine de vacances by Bertrand Tavernier, with Nathalie Baye, Gérard Lanvin, Michel Galabru;
- 1981: Le Voyage à Lyon by Claudia von Alemann;
- 1982: Coup de foudre by Diane Kurys with Miou-Miou, Isabelle Huppert, Guy Marchand;
- 1985: Parole de flic by José Pinheiro, with Alain Delon, Jacques Perrin;
- 1993: Un crime by Jacques Deray, with Alain Delon;
- 1994: Lucie Aubrac by Claude Berri with Carole Bouquet, Daniel Auteuil;
- 1996: Les Voleurs by André Téchiné;
- 1998: Le Gone du Chaâba by Christophe Ruggia, from the book by Azouz Begag;
- 2000: Lyon police spéciale by Bertrand Arthuys;
- 2000: Tout va bien, on s'en va by Claude Mouriéras;
- 2000: Une affaire de goût by Bernard Rapp with Bernard Giraudeau;
- 2002: Inventaire filmé des rues de la Croix-Rousse à Lyon by Gérard Courant;
- 2002: Quand tu descendras du ciel by Éric Guirado;
- 2003: Le Coût de la vie by Philippe Le Guay;
- 2004: Vaada by Satish Kaushik, film by Bollywood;
- 2005: Destination Fourvière by Gérard Courant;
- 2007: Après Lui by Gaël Morel;
- 2007: Détrompez-vous by Bruno Dega;
- 2007: J'veux pas que tu t'en ailles by Bernard Jeanjean;
- 2007: La Fille coupée en deux by Claude Chabrol;
- 2008: Les Liens du sang by Jacques Maillot;
- 2009: The International by Tom Tykwer;
- 2009: Je te mangerais by Sophie Laloy;
- 2011: Les Lyonnais by Olivier Marchal;
- 2011: Les Adoptés by Melanie Laurent

== See also ==
- List of films set in Marseille
- List of films set in Paris
