= Hroar Dege =

Norwegian restaurateur

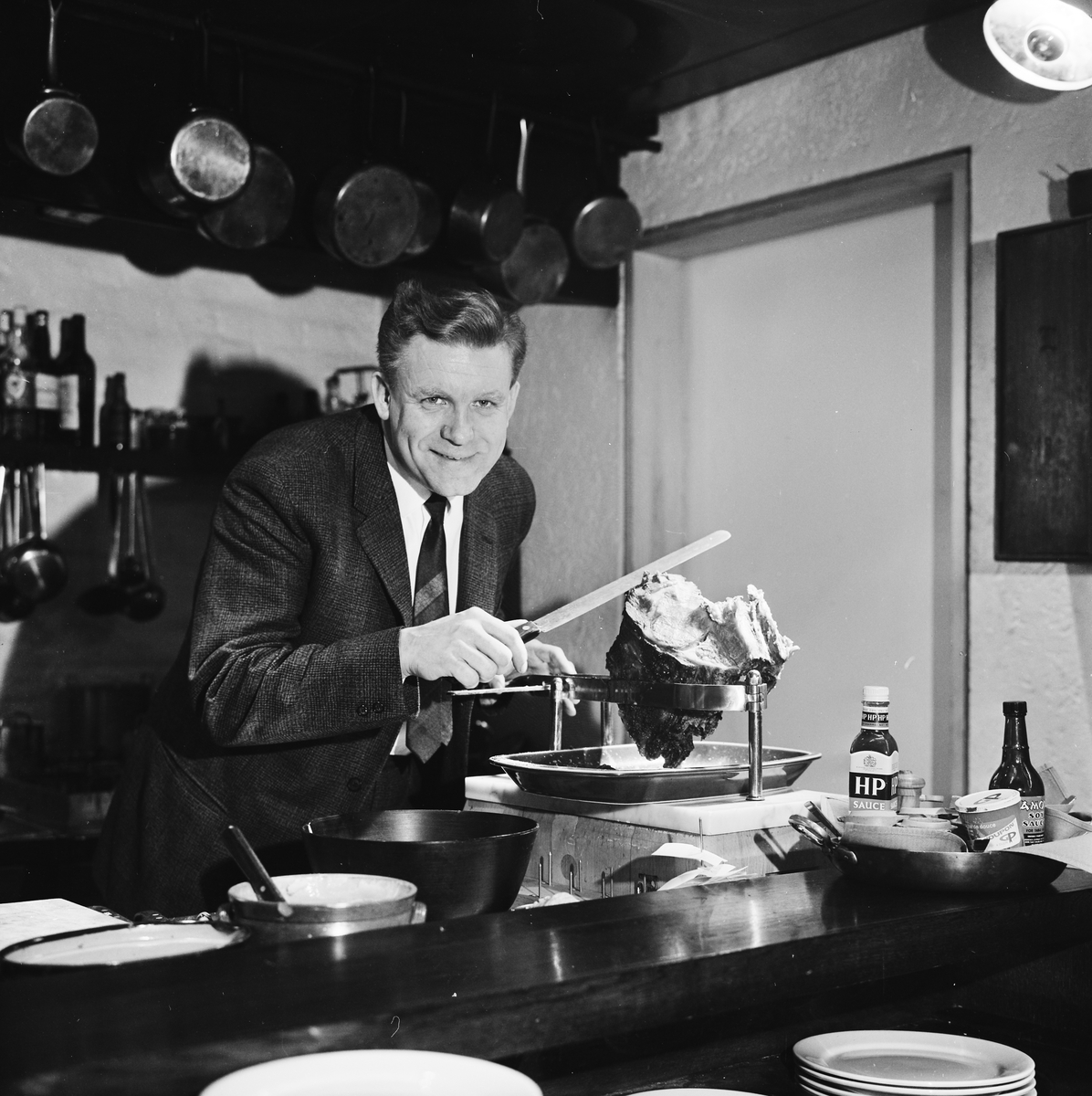
62357 Hroar Dege

Hroar Dege (1920 – 2 September 2003) was a Norwegian restaurateur.

He hailed from Cicignon in Fredrikstad and spent several years abroad. Returning to Norway in 1960, he was the manager of the restaurant Frascati, was the managing director of Norsk matsentrum from 1966 and started the restaurant 3 Kokker in 1969. An accomplished food and wine writer, especially in the 1990s after retiring from the restaurant business, he was awarded the Order of Agricultural Merit and was a Knight, First Class of the Order of St. Olav.
