= Priyam Chatterjee =

Indian chef

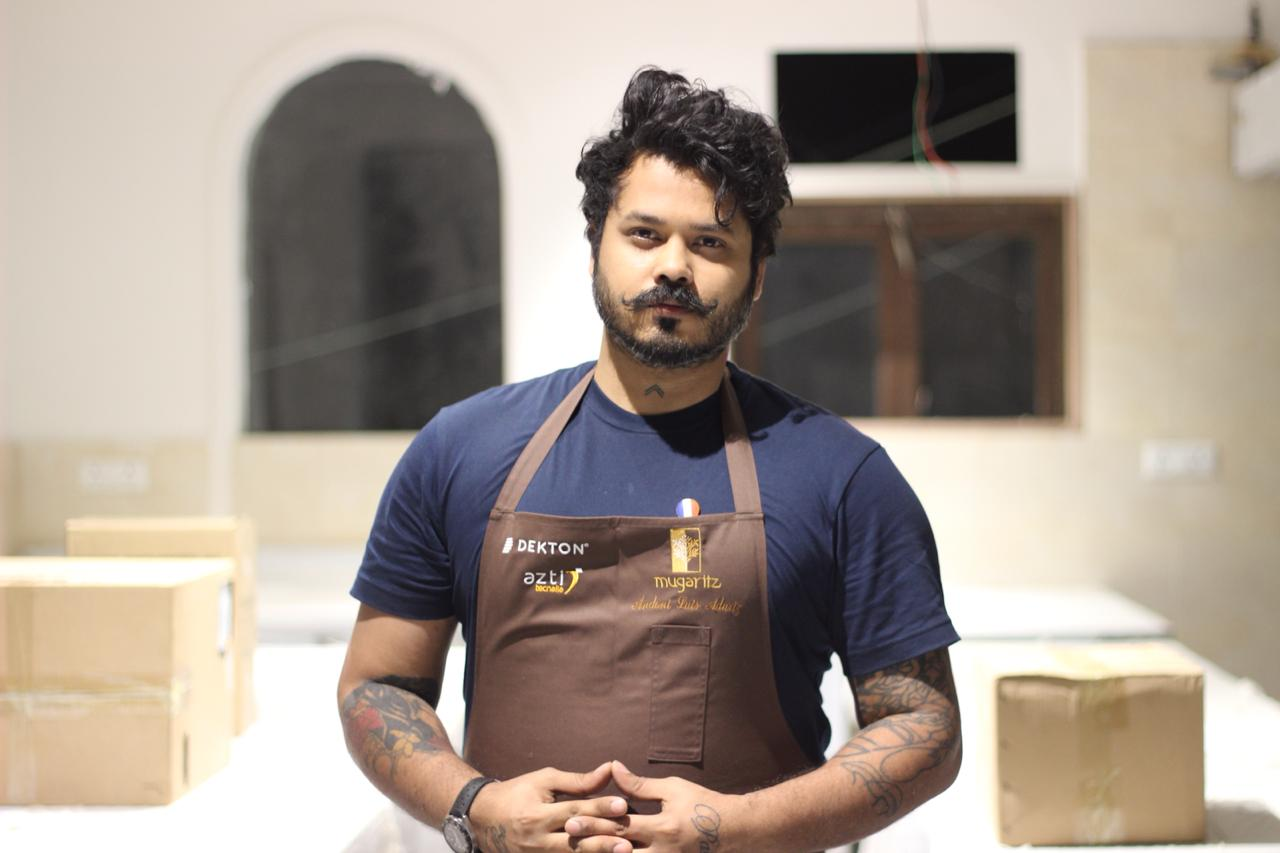
- Born: April 5, 1988 (age 38); Kolkata, India
- Education: NIPS School of Hotel Management
- Awards: Chevalier de l'Ordre du Mérite Agricoleto

Priyam Chatterjee (born 5 April 1988) is an Indian chef. He is the first Indian chef to be awarded France's Ordre du Merite Agricole. He is based in New Delhi.
