= Galouzeau de Villepin family =

- Arms of the Crolbois line: Azure, a fess or, accompanied by three escutcheons argent
- Country: France (originally Burgundy, later established in Lorraine)

The Galouzeau de Villepin family is a surviving family of old French bourgeoisie, originally from Burgundy and later established in Lorraine.

The family numbers among its members two French politicians, one of whom served as Prime Minister of the Fifth Republic, along with numerous senior civil servants, senior military officers, company directors, and a noted sculptor.

Eighteen bearers of the name have been awarded the National Order of the Legion of Honour, sixteen of them for military service.

== History ==
The Galouzeau de Villepin family originates from the Côte-d'Or department. Some of its earliest members were traitants, that is, holders of a public office as tax collectors, such as collectors of the taille.

== Genealogy ==
The family divides into four branches: three surviving branches, descended from three sons of François-Xavier Galouzeau de Villepin (1814–1885), and an older, extinct junior branch represented by the sculptor Louis-Télesphore Galouzeau de Villepin.

=== Origins ===
- Didier Galouzeau, a shoemaker, living at Laignes (Côte-d'Or) and later at Cruzy-le-Châtel (Yonne); married in 1695 to Suzanne Rouot.
  - Jean-Baptiste Galouzeau (1701–1780), schoolmaster at Cruzy-le-Châtel, then civil and criminal clerk of the court of the bailliage of Cruzy-le-Châtel; married in 1721 to Michelette Michelot.
    - Jean-Baptiste Galouzeau (1725–1778), capitaine général des fermes (captain-general of the king's tax farm) at Gérardmer (Vosges); married in 1746 to Jeanne Girardin (1719–1785).
      - Jean-Baptiste Galouzeau (1750–1815), capitaine général des fermes at Saint-Avold (Moselle), later a judge at Buzy (Meuse); between 1778 and 1783 he added to his name the nobiliary particle and the land-name "de Villepin", as did his two brothers; married in 1783 to Marie-Thérèse Brouchon (1766–1835). Their children included:
        - Joseph-Thérèse Galouzeau de Villepin (1786–1872), merchant and road-haulage agent at Metz; married on 22 July 1812 at Metz to Apolline Guertsmayer (b. 1793).
          - François-Xavier Galouzeau de Villepin (10 April 1814, Metz – 1 February 1885, Paris), barrister at the Royal Court of Paris, member of the Academy of Metz, Commander of the Order of St. Sylvester of the Papal States; married in 1847 to Marie-Eugénie de Blair de Balthayock (1815–1896), daughter of Charles-Armand de Blair de Balthayock and of Baroness Louise-Catherine-Alberte de Crolbois de Seewald, daughter of Alexis de Crolbois (d. 1811), a diplomatic agent first to Clemens Wenceslaus of Saxony, Archbishop-Elector of Trier, and then to Louis, Prince of Nassau-Saarbrücken, who created him baron of Seewald and of the Holy Roman Empire in 1794, a title that became extinct on his death; she was the last representative of her family. Three of François-Xavier's sons founded the family's three surviving branches:
            - Georges Galouzeau de Villepin (1849–1931)
            - Alphonse Galouzeau de Villepin (1850–1933)
            - Robert Galouzeau de Villepin (1851–1901)

=== Branch of Georges Galouzeau de Villepin ===
- Georges Galouzeau de Villepin (1849–1931), former student of the École Polytechnique (class of 1868), lieutenant colonel of artillery, Officer of the National Order of the Legion of Honour.
  - Xavier Albert François Galouzeau de Villepin (1880–1943), Saint-Cyr, class of 1900–1902 ("du Tchad"), colonel.
    - Olivier Galouzeau de Villepin (1914–1998), École de l'Air, class of 1935 ("Guynemer"), colonel of aviation, Officer of the National Order of the Legion of Honour.
  - Olivier ("Marie Maurice") Galouzeau de Villepin (1883–1956), Saint-Cyr, class of 1901 ("Centenary of the National Order of the Legion of Honour"), lieutenant colonel of aviation, fighter pilot, Knight of the National Order of the Legion of Honour.
    - François Galouzeau de Villepin (1924–1998).
      - Thierry Galouzeau de Villepin (b. 1950).
        - Quitterie Galouzeau de Villepin (b. 1978).
    - Michel Galouzeau de Villepin (1925–2006), École de l'Air, class of 1945 ("Commandant Marin La Meslée"), lieutenant colonel of aviation, Officer of the National Order of the Legion of Honour.

=== Branch of Alphonse Galouzeau de Villepin ===
- Alphonse Galouzeau de Villepin (1850–1933), Saint-Cyr, class of 1869–1870, colonel, Officer of the National Order of the Legion of Honour. His children included:
  - Georges Galouzeau de Villepin (1890–1966), whose children included:
    - Jean Galouzeau de Villepin (1921–1995), Saint-Cyr, class of 1939–1940 ("Amitié Franco-Britannique"), chef de bataillon, Officer of the National Order of the Legion of Honour.
    - Bruno Galouzeau de Villepin (1924–2022), mayor of Dordives (1965–1989), Knight of the National Order of the Legion of Honour, Officer of the National Order of Merit, Croix de guerre 1939–1945, Croix de guerre des théâtres d'opérations extérieures; married in 1952 to Élisabeth Fougeras de Lavergnolle.
  - Geoffroy Marie Armand Louis Galouzeau de Villepin (1894–1976), Saint-Cyr, class of 1912–1914 ("de Montmirail"), brigadier general, Officer of the National Order of the Legion of Honour. His children included:
    - Christian Galouzeau de Villepin (1 June 1923 – 6 April 2019), Saint-Cyr, class of 1943 ("Veille au drapeau"), chef d'escadron of cavalry, Knight of the National Order of the Legion of Honour.
    - Gaétan Galouzeau de Villepin (1925–2006), chef d'escadron, armoured and cavalry corps, Officer of the National Order of the Legion of Honour, Commander of the National Order of Merit.
      - Laurent Galouzeau de Villepin
        - Lucas Galouzeau de Villepin, journalist.
    - Gonzague Galouzeau de Villepin (1928–1949), École navale, class of 1946; died in the line of duty.
    - Henri Galouzeau de Villepin (b. 20 November 1929), Saint-Cyr, class of 1949–1951 ("Garigliano"), captain of artillery, later a businessman, Knight of the National Order of the Legion of Honour.
    - Yves Galouzeau de Villepin (9 September 1934 – 2 July 2019), Saint-Cyr, class of 1956–1958 ("Général Laperrine"), chef d'escadron, armoured and cavalry corps, Knight of the National Order of the Legion of Honour.

=== Branch of Robert Galouzeau de Villepin ===
- Paul Robert Galouzeau de Villepin (1851–1901), Saint-Cyr, "promotion de la Revanche", staff-qualified lieutenant colonel, Knight of the National Order of the Legion of Honour; married to Thérèse Delor (1864–1951).
  - François-Xavier Galouzeau de Villepin (Limoges, 3 April 1890 – Paris, 10 February 1972), Saint-Cyr, "promotion La Moskowa"; fought in the First World War, notably at Verdun, and later became a director of industrial companies; Officer of the National Order of the Legion of Honour; married to Germaine Maurat-Ballange (6 January 1893 – 26 July 1981), daughter of Albert Maurat-Ballange (1858–1936) and his wife Jeanne Fougeras de Lavergnolle.
    - Jacques Galouzeau de Villepin (1921–2008), former resistant and combatant with the First Army in the liberation of France, Knight of the National Order of the Legion of Honour, Croix de guerre 1939–1945; married to Thérèse du Garreau de La Méchenie.
    - Joseph Marie Benoît François-Xavier Galouzeau de Villepin (1926–2014), businessman, senator for French citizens abroad, chairman of the Senate's Foreign Affairs, Defence and Armed Forces Committee, Officer of the National Order of the Legion of Honour, Officer of the National Order of Merit; married to Yvonne Marie Madeleine Hétier (3 April 1925 – 10 March 2004).
      - Dominique Marie François René Galouzeau de Villepin (b. 1953), graduate of the École nationale d'administration ("promotion Voltaire", 1980), barrister, politician and author, Prime Minister of France from 31 May 2005 to 15 May 2007, Commander of the National Order of the Legion of Honour, Grand Cross of the National Order of Merit and Grand Officer of the Order of Saint-Charles of Monaco; married on 3 August 1985 to Marie-Laure de Villepin-Le Guay (b. 1962), a sculptor, from whom he divorced in 2011.
        - Marie Galouzeau de Villepin (b. 1986), known as Marie Steiss, model, actress and singer.
        - Arthur Galouzeau de Villepin (b. 1988), company chairman.
        - Victoire Galouzeau de Villepin (b. 1990).
      - Véronique Galouzeau de Villepin, graduate of the École nationale d'administration ("promotion Voltaire", 1980); married to General Baudouin Albanel.
      - Patrick Galouzeau de Villepin (b. 1958), graduate of the École nationale d'administration ("promotion Léonard de Vinci", 1985), magistrate at the Cour des comptes, chairman of several BNP Paribas banking subsidiaries, member of the Association of Hereditary Honours, and author of two books on the history of his family.
  - Jacques Ignace Adrien Marie Galouzeau de Villepin (1894–1915), chemical engineer, killed in action ("mort pour la France") on 25 September 1915 at Roclincourt (Pas-de-Calais).

=== Extinct junior branch ===
- Louis-Télesphore Galouzeau de Villepin (1822–1888), sculptor and model-maker.

== Gallery ==
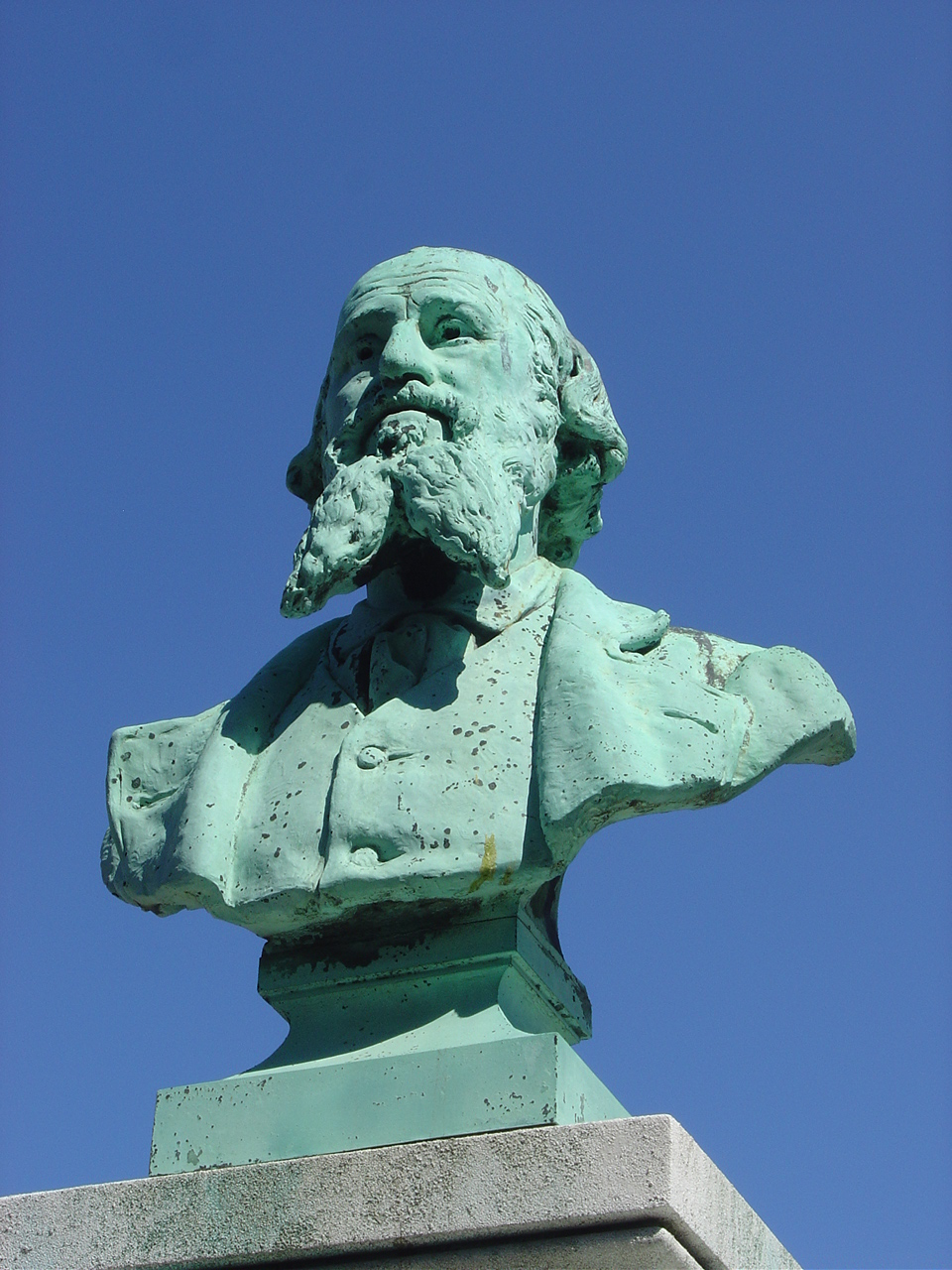
Louis-Télesphore Galouzeau de Villepin.

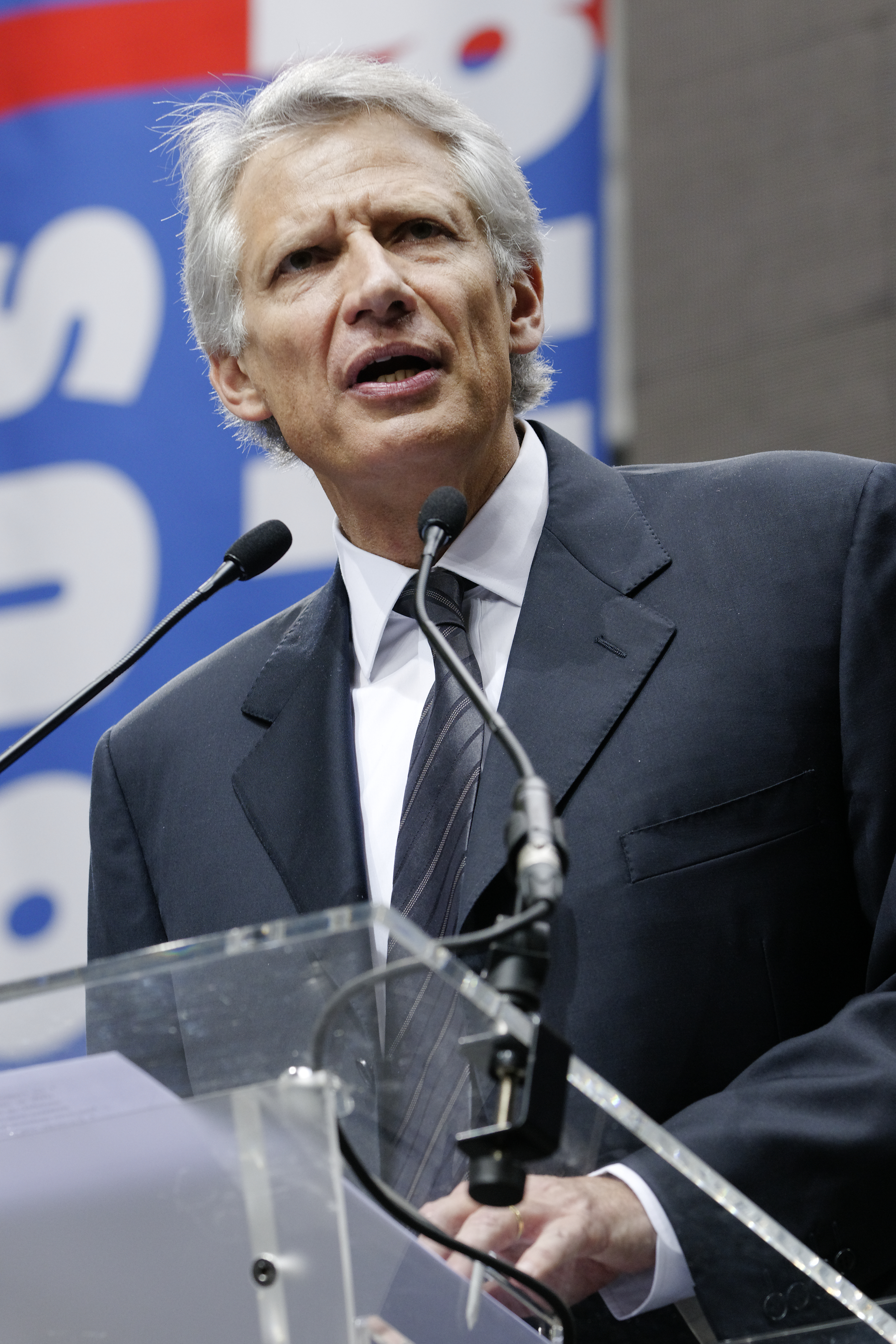
Dominique de Villepin.

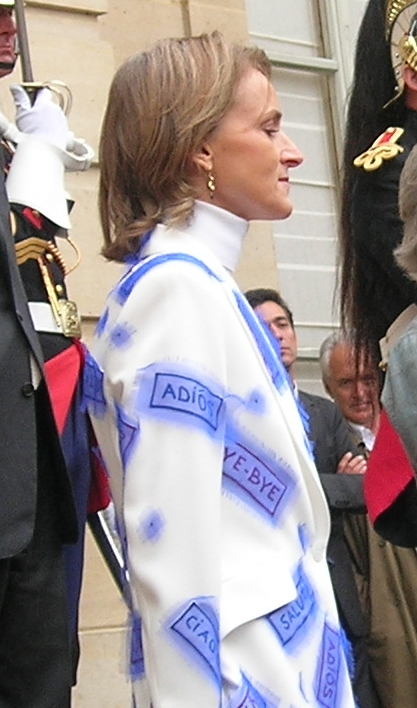
Marie-Laure de Villepin.

== See also ==
=== Bibliography ===
- Chaix d'Est-Ange, Gustave. "Galouzeau de Villepin". Dictionnaire des familles françaises anciennes ou notables à la fin du XIXe siècle. Vol. 20. p. 101.
- de Villepin, Patrick (1986). Encore et toujours : François Xavier Galouzeau de Villepin, 1814–1885, un Lorrain émigré à Paris au XIXe siècle. Paris: self-published.
- de Villepin, Patrick (1987). "Maintenir": Histoire de la famille Galouzeau de Villepin (1397–1987). Paris: self-published.
