= Order of Agricultural Merit =

French order

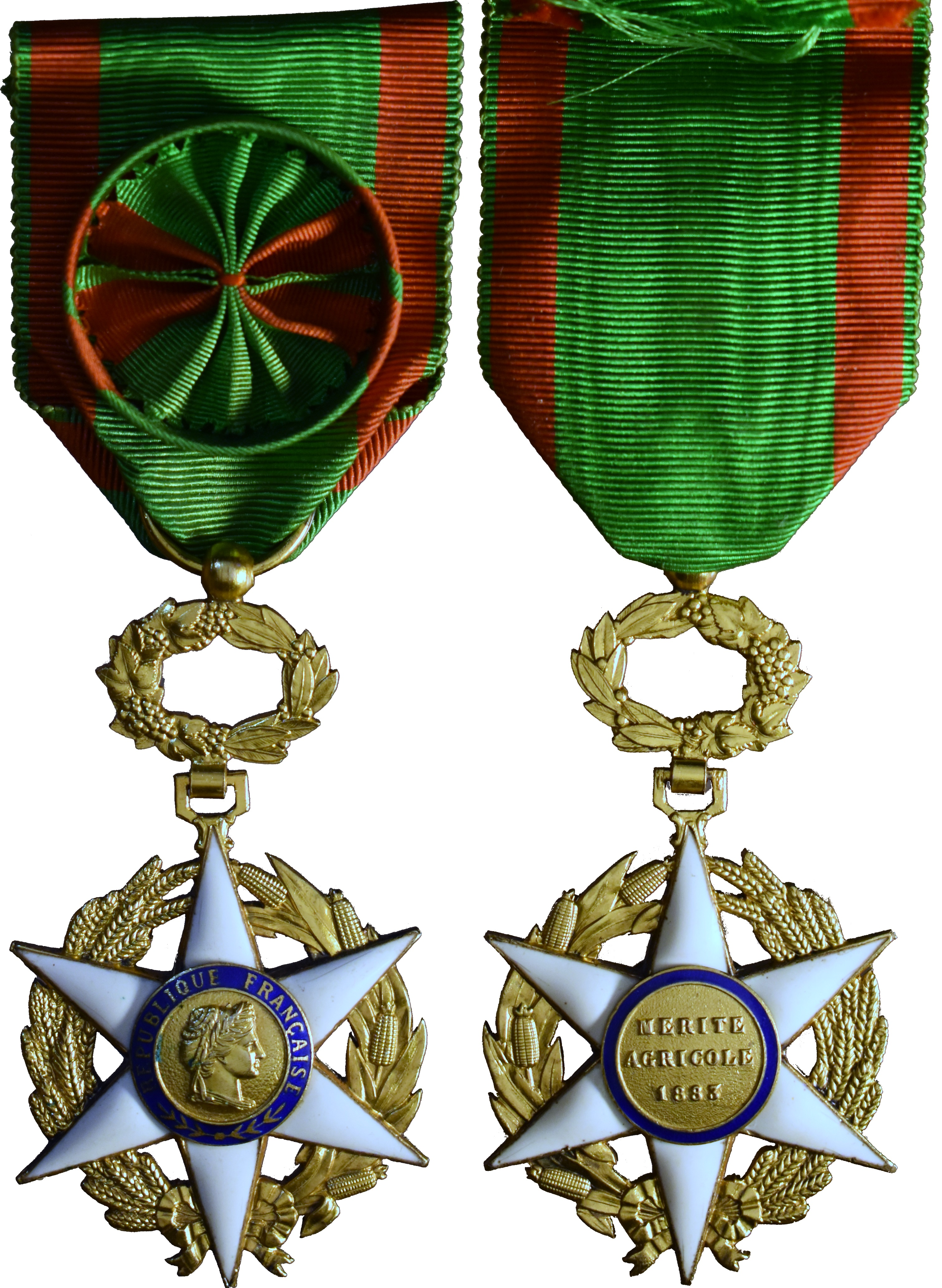
- Officer's insignia (obverse and reverse)

Awarded by the Minister of Agriculture of the French Republic
- Type: Order of merit
- Established: 7 July 1883
- Awarded for: Special distinction in services to agriculture
- Status: Currently constituted
- President of the Order's council: Stéphane Travert, Minister of Agriculture
- Secretary of the Order's council: Coralie Bernard, Chief of Staff of the Ministry of Agriculture office
- Grades: Commander; Officer; Knight

Statistics
- First induction: 17 July 1883
- Last induction: April 2017 (Charles, Prince of Wales)
- Total inductees: 30,000 (living)

Precedence
- Next (higher): Order of Academic Palms
- Next (lower): Order of Maritime Merit
- Related: National Order of Merit
- Commander Officer Knight; The three graded ribbon bars of the Order

The Order of Agricultural Merit (French: Ordre du Mérite agricole) is an order of merit bestowed by the French Republic for outstanding contributions to agriculture. When it was created in 1883, it was second in importance only to the Legion of Honour within the French order of precedence.

== History ==
The order was established on 7 July 1883, based on the proposition of the then Minister of Agriculture Jules Méline, in an effort to adequately reward services to agriculture in view of the maximum number of the Legion of Honour that could be awarded yearly. His reasoning was that more than eighteen million Frenchmen lived directly from this industry, which had a direct and powerful impact on the entire national economy (farmers, agronomists, professors, researchers, etc.). Labour was intensive and never ending, devotion was commonplace but the rewards were rare.

The original 1883 decree created a single-grade order; only "Knights" (French: "chevaliers") were thus decorated. The decree of 18 June 1887 added the grade of "Officer" (French: "Officier"). A third grade, that of "Commander" (French: "Commandeur"), was created by a decree of 3 August 1900. The present form and statute of the Order of Agricultural Merit were outlined in decree 59-729 of 15 June 1959.

To date, the Order has approximately 340,000 recipients, with about 23,000 alive at any given time, including all living former ministers of agriculture. Approximately 60,000 officers have been appointed to date, with about 5,000 currently living. Approximately 4,800 have been made commanders, with about 400 living at any given time.

== Award statute ==
The Order of Agricultural Merit rewards people who rendered exceptional services to agriculture, whether in public duties or in the very practice of agriculture. It also rewards people who distinguished themselves in scientific research or in related publications. There are two annual investiture ceremonies, the first on 1 January and the second on 14 July. The annual contingent has been limited to 60 commanders, 600 officers and 2,400 knights.

Award prerequisites are as follows:

- Knight: be at least thirty years of age with fifteen years of service/work;
- Officer: at least five years as a Member of the order;
- Commander: at least five years as an Officer of the order.

Conditions of age and of seniority may be lowered for candidates who have outstanding qualifications.

A 5% contingency is allowed for people gaining direct entry into the order as officers or commanders for exceptional reasons. Foreigners receiving the order are not subject to the seniority clause. Members of the Order of the Legion of Honour may be admitted to the Order of Agricultural Merit at the same rank they hold in the first.

An award certificate always accompanies the order.

== Insignia ==
The Order of Agricultural Merit is in the form of a 40mm (35mm for pre November 1999) wide star, 60mm for the commander's insignia, with six white enamelled arms, the arms resting on a gilt wreath of wheat on the right and of corn on the left. On the obverse at its center, a gilt medallion bearing the effigy of the republic in the form of the relief right profile of a woman's head, the medallion is surrounded by a narrow blue enamelled band bearing the golden semi circular inscription "RÉPUBLIQUE FRANÇAISE" ("FRENCH REPUBLIC"). On the reverse, the gilt medallion bears the relief inscription on three lines "MÉRITE" "AGRICOLE" "1883" ("AGRICULTURAL MERIT 1883"), it is surrounded by a plain blue enamelled band.

The officers' and commanders' badges also bear a gilt wreath, half vine and half olive branch, between the insignia and the ribbon suspension ring.

The knight's insignia is made of silver, the officer's is made of silver-gilt, the commander's is made of silver-gilt or gold.

The order hangs from a 37mm wide silk moiré green ribbon with 5mm amaranth vertical stripes located 1mm from the edges. The commander's insignia is worn on a cravat around the neck.

Knight	Officer	Commander

== Notable recipients ==
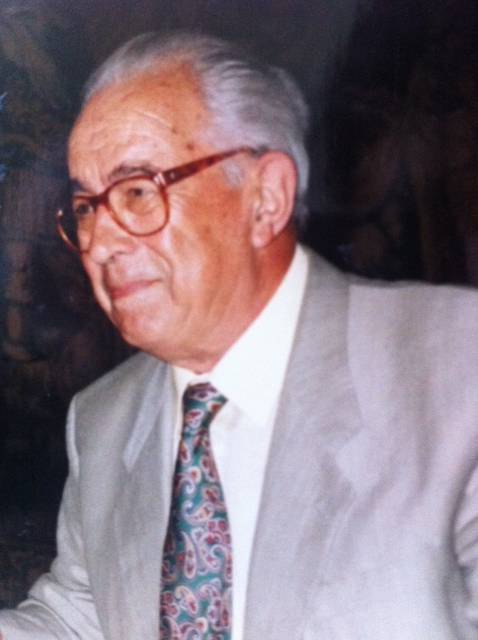
Oenologist Denis Boubals, a recipient of the Order of Agricultural Merit

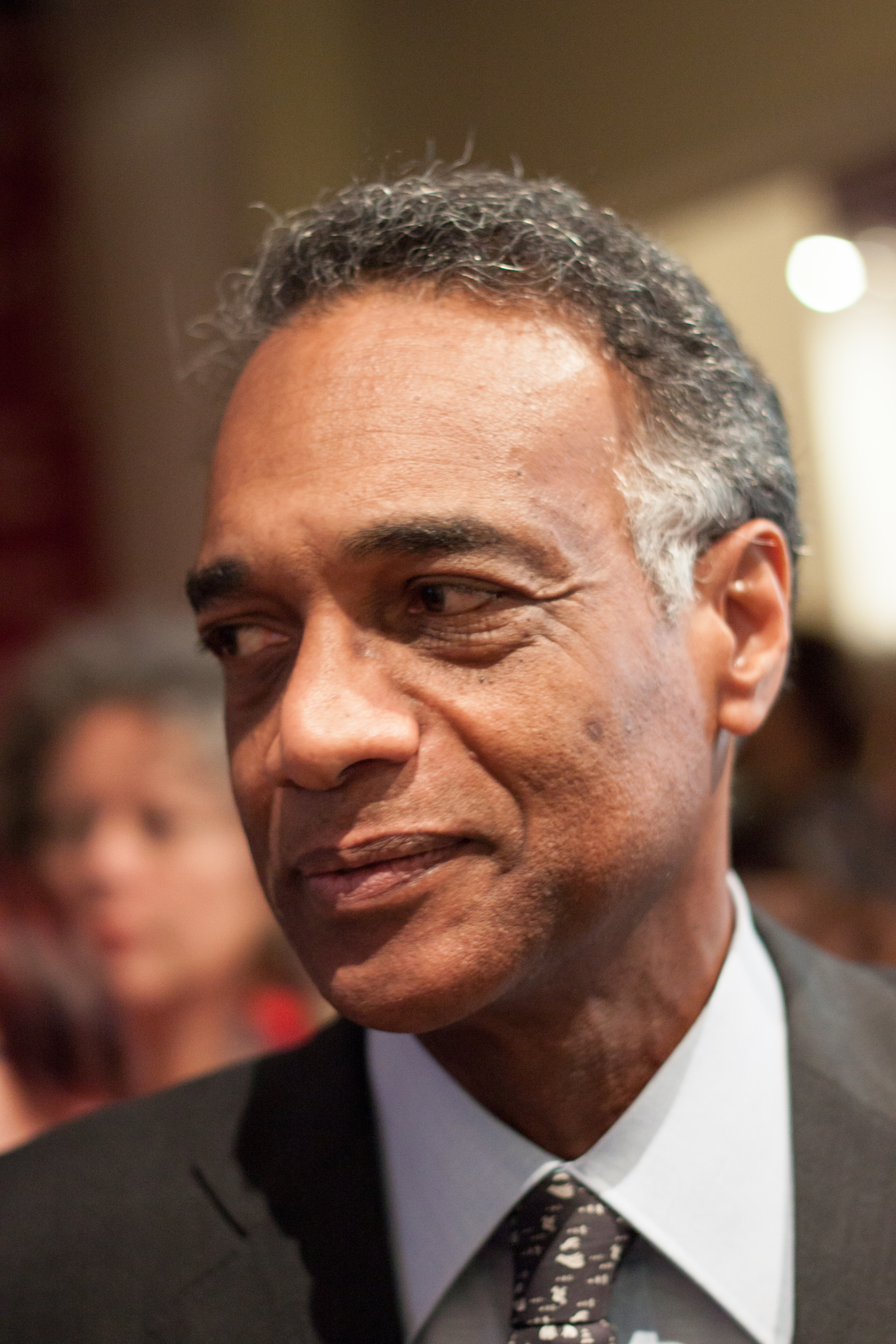
Prefect Richard Samuel, a recipient of the Order of Agricultural Merit

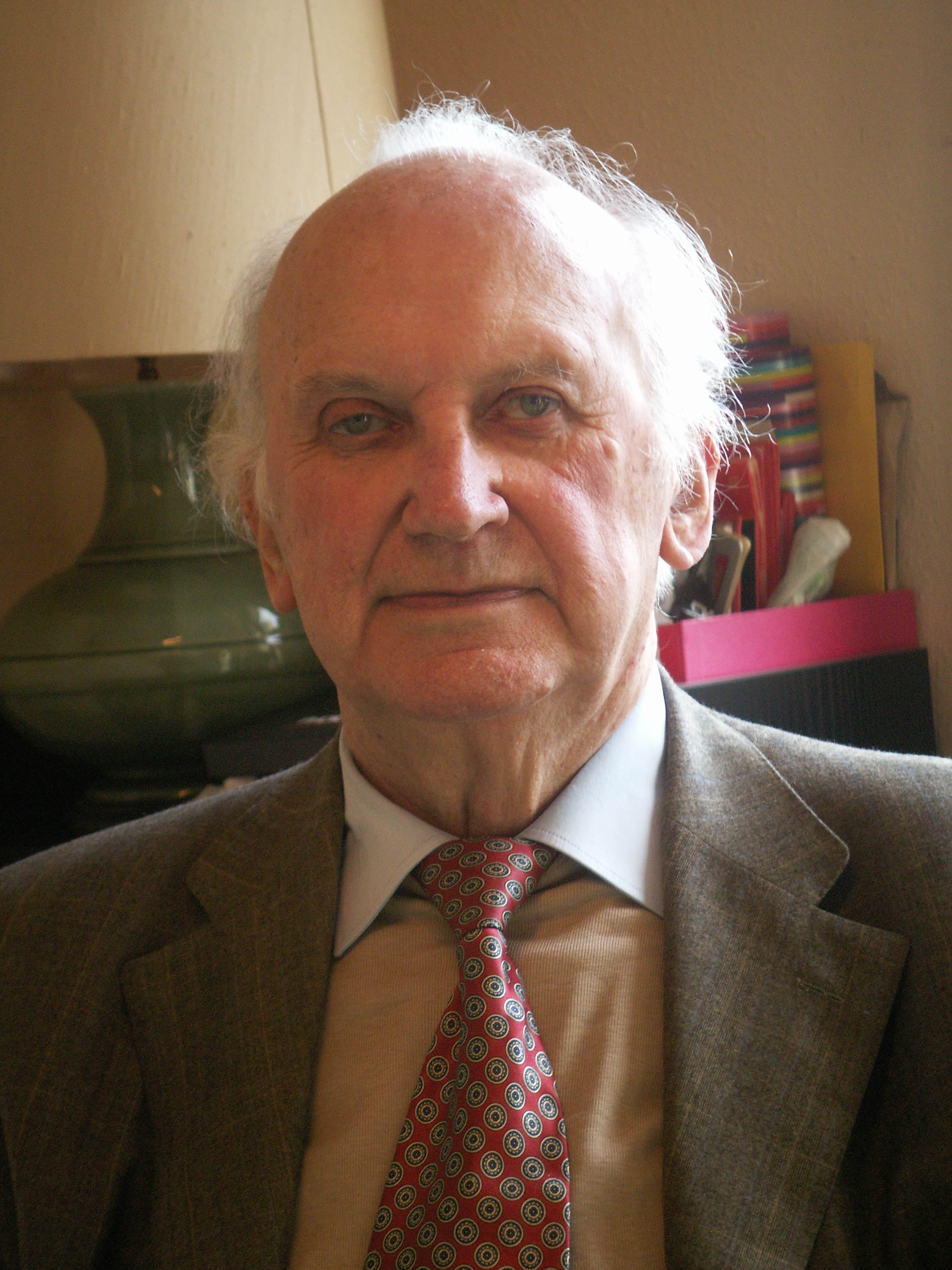
Professor Pierre Barrère, a recipient of the Order of Agricultural Merit

=== Commanders ===
- Queen Anne, Queen Consort of Romania
- Gerrit Braks
- Albert II, Prince of Monaco
- Princess Caroline, Princess of Hanover
- King Charles III of the United Kingdom
- Jean Dupuy
- Jules Gravereaux
- Jean-Paul Huchon
- Christine Lagarde
- Stéphane Le Foll
- René Renou
- W. E. Shewell-Cooper
- Henri Stehlé
- Marc Darbonne

=== Officers ===
- Gerard Bertholon
- Christian Bind
- Michel Durodie
- Dominique Levy
- Ernest Vaux
- Luu Meng
- Pierre Galet
- John C. H. Lee
- Will Studd
- Oz Clarke

=== Knights ===
- Philippe Adnot
- Yann Arthus-Bertrand
- Florian Bellanger
- Wina Born
- Laura Calder
- Jacques Cariou
- Priyam Chatterjee
- Jean-Pierre Chessé
- Jacques Chirac
- Elizabeth David
- Vasily Dokuchaev
- Serge Dumont
- Alice Feiring
- Patricia Gallagher
- Thomas Harvey Gill
- Henry S. Graves
- Michel Guérard
- Hermann Jaeger
- Rita Jammet
- Mariel Jean-Brunhes Delamarre
- Paul Jules Jourcin
- Richard Juhlin
- Eugène Leguen de Lacroix
- Patrick Levaye
- Bernard Loiseau
- Kermit Lynch
- Debra Meiburg
- Christian André Monchatre
- Brian Morrissey
- Thomas Volney Munson
- Roland Passot
- Louis Pasteur
- Jacques Pépin
- Paul Prudhomme
- Thierry Rautureau
- Jean Rochefort
- Daniel Rose
- Wolfram Siebeck
- Lyle F. Watts
- Jean Wiener
- Jon Winroth
- Papa Abdoulaye Seck
- Estelle Touzet
- Shahrzad Shokouhivand
- Chee Song KOH
- Suswono

Joseph F Tromelin

=== Unknown rank ===
- Jean Carmet
- Catherine Deneuve
- Paul Morand
- Roger Peyrefitte
- Charles Semblat
- Michel Serrault
- Thomas Jefferson

== See also ==
- Ministry of Agriculture (France)
- Order of Merit for Agriculture, Fisheries and Food
