= Shahrzad Shokouhivand =

Iranian chef

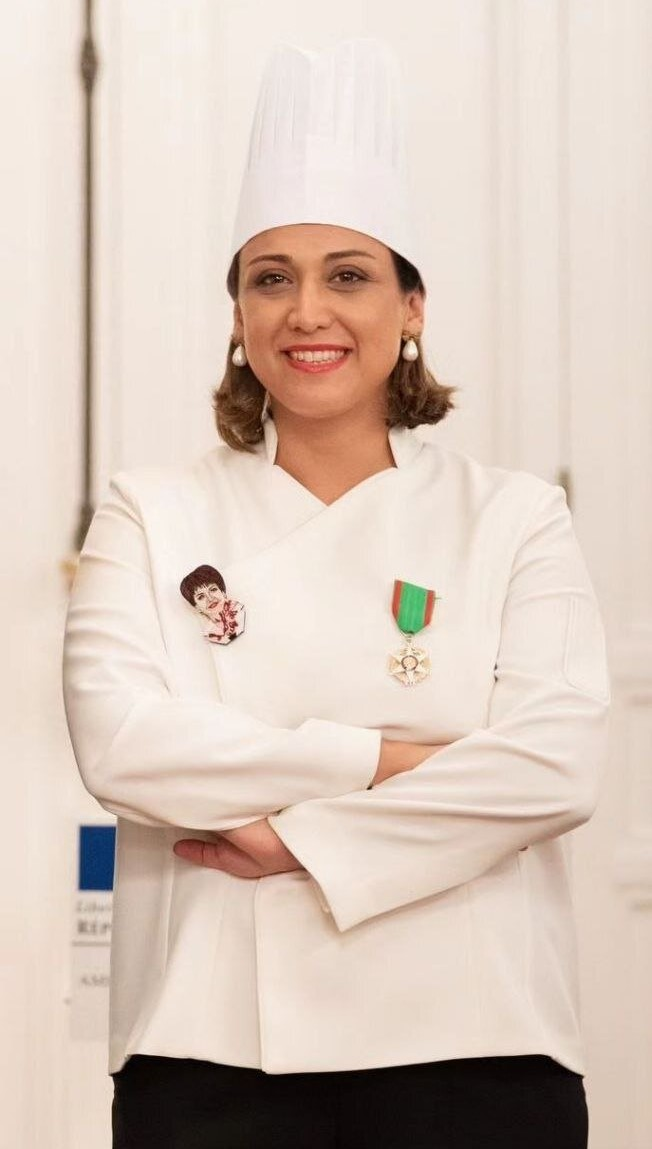
- Shahrzad Shokouhivand at the Chevalier award ceremony, French Embassy in Tehran, 2023
- Born: 14 March 1986 (age 40); Tehran, Iran
- Education: Islamic Azad University; Le Cordon Bleu
- Occupations: Pastry chef, entrepreneur
- Known for: Founder of Femmechic and Atelier Shahrzad Pastry; Receiving the Chevalier de l'Ordre du Mérite Agricole
- Spouse: Babak Mehrabani (m. 2012)
- Children: 2
- Awards: Chevalier de l'Ordre du Mérite Agricole (2023)
- Website: shahrzadshokouhivand.com

Shahrzad Shokouhivand (Persian: شهرزاد شکوهی‌وند; born 14 April 1986) is an Iranian pastry chef and entrepreneur known for founding Femmechic and Atelier Shahrzad in Tehran and for being the first Iranian female pastry chef to receive the Chevalier de l'Ordre du Mérite Agricole from the French Ministry of Agriculture in 2023. She has gained recognition for blending French and Iranian culinary traditions, incorporating ingredients like pistachio, saffron, and sumac into French pastries.

== Biography ==
Her passion for cooking began in childhood when she prepared breakfast for her parents, which later guided her toward a career in pastry. Shokouhivand is married to Babak Mehrabani.

== Education ==
In 2004, Shokouhivand studied hotel management at the Islamic Azad University, Science and Research Branch. In 2017, she completed a three-month pastry course at Le Cordon Bleu in Paris.

== Career ==
Shokouhivand founded Femme Chic, a patisserie in central Tehran's Enghelab Street, retaining the name of the previous handbag store. By introducing French pastries such as tarte Tatin and baba au rhum (without rum) and using Iranian ingredients like pistachio, saffron, and sumac, she contributed to transforming Iran's pastry consumption culture. Her signature dessert, Baba Tabrizi, inspired by the Azerbaijani Akuri and created to mark the 20th anniversary of her father-in-law's passing, features cardamom and saffron syrup.

In 2020, she opened a second location, Atelier Shahrzad, in Tehran's Elahieh district, known for handmade pastries and British-style afternoon tea. Due to economic challenges, including high rents, this branch closed, and operations focused back on Femme Chic. By 2023, Shokouhivand and her husband, Babak Mehrabani Irani, employed 70 people, predominantly women, across their businesses.

Instead of emigrating to Canada or Australia, she chose to remain in Iran, stating, "Only by working here can we change things in Iran."

== Awards ==
On 2 August 2023, Shokouhivand became the first Iranian female pastry chef to receive the Chevalier de l'Ordre du Mérite Agricole from the French Ministry of Agriculture. The award recognized her creative fusion of Iranian and French culinary traditions, including the use of local ingredients like sumac, saffron, and pistachio in classic French pastries. Femme Chic's proximity to the French Embassy in Tehran and frequent visits by French diplomats drew the attention of the Goût de France committee.

== Culinary style ==
Shokouhivand revives Iranian flavors by incorporating ingredients like pistachio, saffron, and sumac into French pastries. She focuses on classic pastry techniques, distancing herself from modern French dessert trends.

== Media coverage ==
Shokouhivand has gained attention in domestic and international media for her culinary innovations and role as a female entrepreneur. In an interview with Financial Times, she described cafés as an emotional refuge during economic hardship: "When the economy is bad, people eat sweets... people survive by socializing in cafés." Her decision to stay in Iran and pursue pastry has been highlighted as inspirational in outlets such as Baking Business (Australia), The Times of India, Malay Mail (Malaysia), La Provence (France), and Al-Monitor.
