= Daniel Rose =

Daniel, Dan or Danny Rose may refer to:

- Daniel Rose (politician) (1772–1833), American politician
- Danny Rose (footballer, born 1988), English football coach and former professional footballer (Oxford United, Newport County)
- Danny Rose (footballer, born 1990), English former professional footballer (Tottenham Hotspur, England national team)
- Danny Rose (footballer, born 1993), English professional footballer (Barnsley, Bury, Mansfield Town, Northampton Town, Stevenage, Grimsby Town, Barrow, Exeter)
- Dan Rose (footballer, born 2003), Irish professional football goalkeeper
- Daniel Rose (chef), American-born Paris-based chef
- Daniel Rose (real estate developer) (born 1929), American real estate developer and philanthropist
- Daniel Asa Rose (born 1949), American author, journalist, and editor
- Broadway Danny Rose, 1984 film directed by Woody Allen
