= La Folie (restaurant) =

Former French restaurant in San Francisco, California, U.S.

- Interactive map of La Folie

Restaurant information
- Established: 1988
- Closed: 2020
- Owner: Roland Passot
- Chef: Roland Passot
- Food type: French
- Location: 2316 Polk Street, San Francisco, California, 94109, United States
- Coordinates: 37°47′53.3″N 122°25′19.5″W
- Website: lafolie.com

La Folie (French: [la fɔli]) was a French restaurant in Russian Hill, San Francisco, in the U.S. state of California. The fine dining establishment had received a Michelin star, before closing in 2020.

== Description ==
Serving French cuisine, La Folie's menu includes a poached lobster, foie gras, and soufflé.

== History ==
La Folie opened in 1988. On March 14, 2020, owner and chef Roland Passot closed the restaurant.

== See also ==
- List of defunct restaurants of the United States
- List of French restaurants
- List of Michelin-starred restaurants in California
