= Daniel Asa Rose =

American author, journalist, and editor

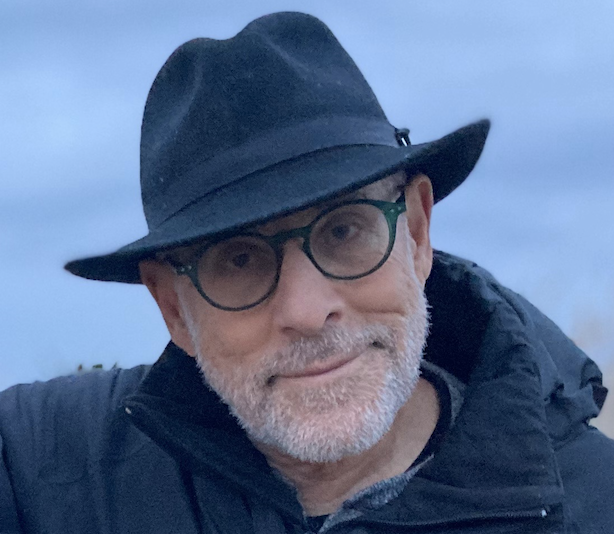
Rose in 2020

Daniel Asa Rose (born November 20, 1949) is an American author, journalist, critic, and editor. His writing is known for its themes of family, memory, and Jewish identity.

== Early life and education ==
Born in Brooklyn, New York to Anne (née Kaufman) and Gilbert Rose, Rose grew up in Rowayton, Connecticut.

He graduated from Brown University in 1971 with a degree in English.

== Career ==
Rose's first published short story, "Small Family with Rooster," ran in The New Yorker in 1977.

His short story "The Goodbye Present" received an O. Henry Award in 1980.

In 1987, he published his first novel, Flipping For It. A black comedy about divorce, it was named a New York Times New and Noteworthy Paperback.

Rose published his short story collection Small Family With Rooster in 1988. He received PEN Fiction Awards for two stories in the collection.

In 2000, Rose published Hiding Places: A Father and his Sons Retrace Their Family's Escape From the Holocaust, a memoir that intermingles a taut current-day search for the hiding places that saved his family in World War II with memories of his own hiding places growing up in suburban 1950s Connecticut. It earned starred reviews in Publishers Weekly and Kirkus Reviews, as well as the New England Booksellers Discovery Award and inclusion in the collection Best Jewish Writing 2003.

In 2006, he received a Literature Fellowship from the National Endowments for the Arts, alongside Jhumpa Lahiri.

In 2010, Rose published Larry's Kidney: Being the True Story of How I Found Myself in China with My Black Sheep Cousin and His Mail-Order Bride, Skirting the Law to Get Him a Transplant--and Save His Life. A comic memoir about medical tourism, it was named one of Publishers Weekly's Best Books of the Year.

In May 2014, The Wrap reported that Richard Linklater was adapting Larry's Kidney into a feature film starring Will Ferrell and Zach Galifianakis, though Linklater later told IndieWire that the project was no longer moving ahead due to a lack of funding.

In 2023, Rose's memoir Truth or Consequences: Improbable Adventures, a Near-Death Experience, and Unexpected Redemption in the New Mexico Desert was published by High Road Books, an imprint of the University of New Mexico Press. The Albuquerque Journal ranked it as one of the best memoirs of the year.

Rose has also served as arts & culture editor of The Forward, editor of Barbara Probst Solomon's literary magazine The Reading Room, and writer-in-residence at Western Connecticut State University's Creative and Professional Writing MFA program.

== Works ==
=== Novels ===
- Flipping For It (St. Martin's Press, 1987)

=== Short story collections ===
- Small Family with Rooster (St. Martin's Press, 1988)

=== Memoirs ===
- Hiding Places: A Father and his Sons Retrace Their Family's Escape From the Holocaust (Simon and Schuster, 2000)
- Larry's Kidney: Being the True Story of How I Found Myself in China with My Black Sheep Cousin and His Mail-Order Bride, Skirting the Law to Get Him a Transplant--and Save His Life (Harper, 2010)
- Truth or Consequences: Improbable Adventures, a Near-Death Experience, and Unexpected Redemption in the New Mexico Desert (High Road Books, 2023)

== Personal ==
Rose lives in Connecticut. He has four sons, including actor Jeremy Roth-Rose.
