= Shantytown Kid =

Book by Azouz Begag

Shantytown Kid (Le Gone du Chaâba)
- Cover of the 1986 Editions du Seuil edition
- Author: Azouz Begag
- Language: French
- Publisher: Éditions du Seuil
- Publication date: 1986
- Publication place: France

Le Gone du Chaâba (transl. The Kid of the Chaaba), translated into English as Shantytown Kid by Naima Wolf, is an autobiographical novel by Azouz Begag about his life as a young Algerian boy growing up in a shantytown next to Lyon, France, called the Chaâba by its inhabitants.

== Context ==
The story covers a period of approximately three years in the life of the protagonist and deals with issues developing from the clash between two cultures, that of France and that of North Africa, as well as the difficulties of finding a cultural identity between the two. The story focuses on the cultural differences between the Arab and French communities, as well as how the two groups react to each other. A version was filmed in 1998 by Christophe Ruggia, and received a César Award nomination for Best Debut.

== Synopsis ==
The novel tells the story of Azouz, a young Algerian. He lives in Chaaba, a slum on the outskirts of Lyon, in a miserable hovel with neither water nor electricity, amongst other Arab families.

Azouz has two older siblings; a brother named Mustafa and a sister named Zohra. Even if they do well at school, they are required to work menial jobs at the shops in order to make a little money for their families. At school, Azouz sits at the front of class and always listens to what his teachers say. Despite arguing with his father Bouzid, he gets the second-best mark in the class after handing in an essay.

He is happy, but soon certain Arabs in his class mock him and ostracize him, no longer considering him an Arab. Unlike his friends, his father is very proud of him, and constantly repeats that by doing well at school, Azouz will be able to get a good job 'like a Frenchman', rather than ending up a mason like his father.

Later, his uncle, who is estranged from Azouz's father and who also lives in Chaaba, is arrested by the police because he is involved in black-market sales of meat. In fact it is Azouz himself who shows him to the police, believing it will help his family. As a result of the arrest many families leave Chaaba, but Azouz's father refuses to do so.

However one morning the Bouchaouis, a family who once lived in Chaaba, but have now moved to a flat in Lyon, return to explain to Azouz's father how life in a flat is much better than life back in Chaaba. Mr Bouachaoui has even found a flat for Azouz's family to thank Bouzid for what he's done for them.

Finally, after the constant clamour of 'I want to move' from his children, Azouz's father accepts and the Begags move to their new apartment in Lyon. Azouz is astonished by the running water and proper toilets, as well as the electricity and (of course) the TV.

Initially there he doesn't make any firends, but Azouz soon meets and befriends another child from Chaaba. At school, he has a dreadful year at the end of primary school because the teacher dislikes him; after this, he enters senior school, where his French teacher - Mr Loubon - is a pied-noir, a former European settler from Algeria. He will be instrumental in helping Azouz with his work, and a warm friendship grows between the two, as they speak of their shared experiences of Algeria and learn each other's slang.
