= Azouz Begag =

French sociologist, economist and writer

- عزوز بقاق
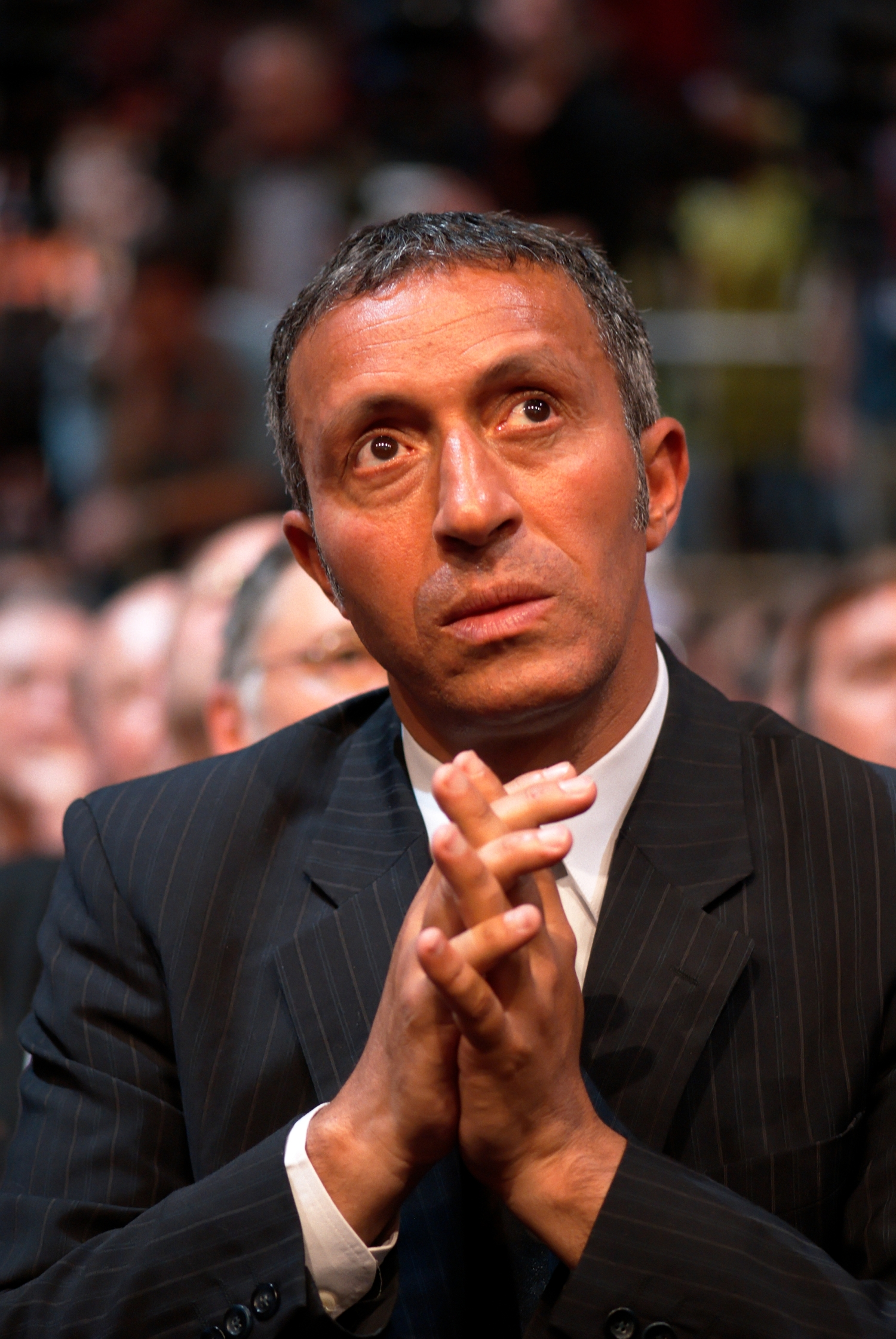
- Azouz Begag in 2007

Delegate minister for equal opportunities
- In office 2 June 2005 – 5 April 2007
- President: Jacques Chirac
- Prime Minister: Dominique de Villepin

Personal details
- Born: 5 February 1957 (age 69) Lyon, Rhône, France
- Education: Lumière University Lyon 2

Azouz Begag (Arabic: عزوز بقاق) (born 5 February 1957) is a French writer, politician and researcher in economics and sociology at the CNRS. He was the delegate minister for equal opportunities of France in the government of French Prime Minister Dominique de Villepin (Union for a Popular Movement, UMP) till 5 April 2007. He resigned to support the moderate centrist candidate François Bayrou, one of the two UMP ministers to do so.

Before becoming minister, Begag was decorated and made Chevalier de l’Ordre national du Mérite and Knight of the Legion of Honor.

== Early and personal life ==
Begag is the son of Algerian parents who arrived in France in 1949. In his teens, he qualified as an electrician. He grew up in a shanty town outside Lyon, "les bas quartiers", before the family progressed to a tower block in the Cité de la Duchère.

Begag is the father of two daughters. He is divorced from his wife.

== Career in research ==
Begag has a doctorate in economics from Lumière University Lyon 2. He has combined the functions of researcher in economy at the CNRS and at the Maison des sciences sociales et humaines of Lyon since 1980 and the one of professor at the École Centrale de Lyon. A visiting professor in Spring 2002 at the Winthrop-King Institute for Contemporary French and Francophone Studies at Florida State University, Begag was later made an honorary professor. In addition, he was a visiting professor at Cornell University in New York for one year. Begag's academic career, culminating in his place as a researcher at the CNRS, as well as his political career to date, have also centered around the problems of unequal opportunity for those brought up in industrial suburbs and ghettos. In his account in 2007 of his two years as minister, The Sheep in the Bathtub, he describes his research work as that of a sociologist.

== Literary works ==
Begag has written approximately 20 literary books for adults and children, as well as songs. Furthermore, he is the scriptwriter of the French movie Camping à la ferme ("Camping at the farm"), where he exposed his vision of "three levels of riches" multiculturalism in today's French society : the advantages of its relatively new multiethnicity due to a new non-European immigration mixed with the basis of its historical and natural multiculturality whether coming from the riches of its several regional cultures and languages or from the successful integration of previous waves of European immigration during its history.

Begag's best known literary work (he has published many novels often inspired by his childhood) is the autobiographical novel Le Gone du Chaâba, published in 1986 by Éditions du Seuil. The title itself is a clever play on one of his regional language's words. 'Gone' is a term for 'kid' or 'lad' in the Lyonnais dialect of Arpitan used in his native region and city, while 'Chaâba' is an Arabic word, used in the book as the name of a shantytown in Sétif, Algeria. Both Azouz Begag and the protagonist of the novel grew up in a shanty town outside Lyon, almost entirely inhabited by Algerian or Kabyle immigrant workers. The language and culture were predominantly a mix of Algerian Arabic, Kabyle Tamazigh and Arpitan. The problems of the ghetto-like environments established by and for guest workers in France after WWII, of the individual children of these ghettos who are French Citizens by dint of being born in France and even often from French parents and for whom 'breaking out' is both very difficult and statistically improbable, and Azouz Begag's own success in managing being part of the mainstream of French culture without having to forget any part of his heritage but rather by accumulating all cultural influences, are at the heart of the novel.

== Social and political works ==
His most widely published book is his account in 2007 of his two years as minister. Titled The Sheep in the Bathtub, this is a reference to a quote from Nicolas Sarkozy warning French Muslims not to slaughter sheep in their bathtubs for Eid al-Adha.

== Ministerial career ==
Azouz Begag was minister during the 2005 civil unrest in France. Begag confronted Interior minister Nicolas Sarkozy (UMP) on the subject of the policies in the suburbs of Paris. Azouz Begag also publicly opposed Sarkozy in his movie 'Camping à la ferme' (from 2005, coming out shortly after he was named minister).

He was, in October 2005, at the centre of a diplomatic incident between France and the United States. Begag, despite being a French citizen, a French minister and holding an A1 diplomatic visa, was intercepted at US immigration in Atlanta airport, saw his diplomatic immunity challenged and was heavily questioned in the green room. This was considered as racial profiling on the part of the US immigration officers and very strongly criticized in France.

On 16 March 2007, Begag officially announced his support for the UDF candidate François Bayrou. Begag resigned from the French government on 5 April 2007.

He is a MoDem regional councillor in the Centre region. In 2009, he was selected to be the MoDem's candidate in the Rhône-Alpes region for the 2010 regional elections.

== Works ==
Books By Azouz Begag:

- Le gone du Chaâba, Éditions du Seuil, Collection Virgule, (1986)
- Béni ou le Paradis privé, Éditions du Seuil, Collection Virgule, (1989)
- L'Îlet aux vents, Éditions du Seuil, Collection Virgule, (1992)
- Les Chiens aussi, Éditions du Seuil, Collection Virgule, (1995)
- Zenzela, Éditions du Seuil, (1997)
- Dis Oualla, Éditions Fayard, Collection Libres, (1997)
- Tranches de vie, Kleth Verlag, (1998)
- Le Passeport (2000)
- Le Marteau Pique-cœur, Éditions du Seuil, (2004)
- Un mouton dans la baignoire, Fayard, (2007)
- Ethnicity and Equality: France in the Balance (2007) translated and with an introduction by Alec G. Hargreaves.

Books for children:

- Les Voleurs d'écriture, Éditions du Seuil, Collection Petit Point, (1990)
- La Force du berger, La Joie de Lire, (1991)
- Jordi et le rayon perdu, La Joie de Lire, (1992)
- Les Tireurs d'étoiles, Éditions du Seuil, Collection Petits Points, (1993)
- Le Temps des villages, La Joie de Lire, (1993)
- Une semaine de vacances à Cap maudit, Éditions du Seuil, Collection Petits Points, (1993)
- Mona ou le bateau-livre, Chardon Bleu, (1994)
- Quand on est mort, c'est pour toute la vie, Gallimard, (1995)
- Ma maman est devenue une étoile, La Joie de Lire, (1996)
- Le théorème de Mamadou, Ill. Jean Claverie, Éditions du Seuil, (2002)
