= Roland Passot =

French chef and restaurateur

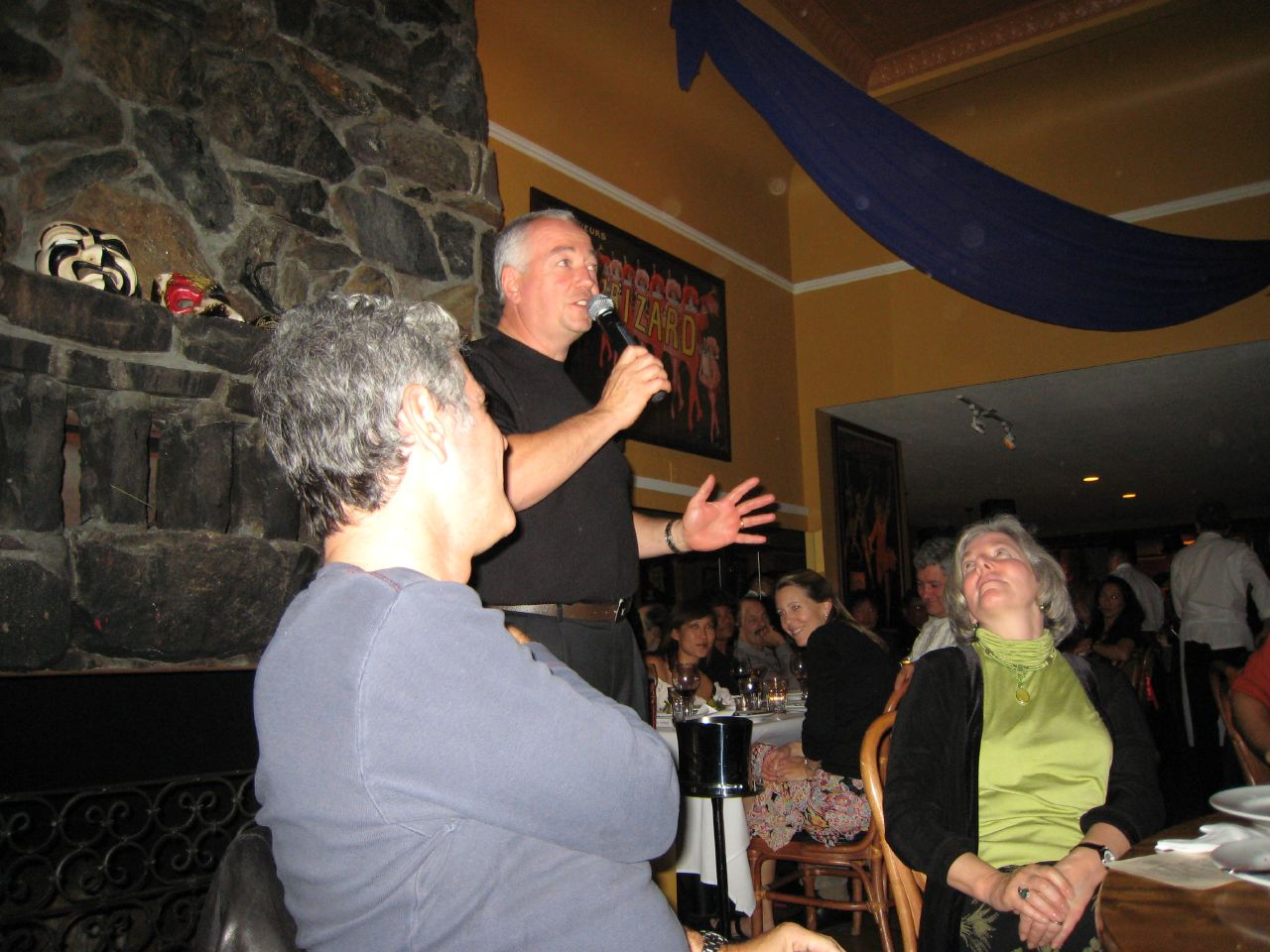
- Passot at a staff appreciation dinner
- Born: Villefranche-sur-Saône, France
- Culinary career
- Cooking style: French
- Rating(s): Michelin stars San Francisco Chronicle Mobil Guide
- Current restaurant(s): Left Bank, LB Steak, MESO Modern Mediterranean, Petite Left Bank, Rollati Ristorante
- Award won: James Beard Award

Roland Passot (French pronunciation: [ʁɔlɑ̃ paso]) is a French chef and restaurateur. His best-known restaurant, La Folie, was open in San Francisco from 1988 to 2020. He is also the owner of the more casual Left Bank brasseries and LB Steak restaurants. Passot was named one of "the eight wonders of Bay Area dining" by San Francisco Chronicle lead critic Michael Bauer.

== Early life and career ==
Passot was born in 1955 in Villefranche-sur-Saône, in France's Rhône-Alpes. He is a classically trained French chef, having attended cooking school in Lyon while beginning as an assistant, at age fourteen, in the city's Léon de Lyon restaurant under Chef Paul Lacombe, and then Pierre Orsi Restaurant. After Passot rose to the rank of assistant sous-chef at Léon de Lyon, Jean Banchet (who Passot considers his most important influence) recruited him in 1979 to work at Le Francais in Wheeling, Illinois (near Chicago, Illinois | Chicago), then sent him in 1981 to open the French Room at the Adolphus Hotel in Dallas, Texas (He was fired from the French Room after getting into a shouting match with its maitre d'). In between, he opened Le Castel in San Francisco.

== Restaurants ==
Passot opened La Folie on Polk Street in 1988, with his wife Jamie and brother Georges. A small brasserie in the Polk Gulch section of the Russian Hill neighborhood of San Francisco, it opened at a cost of $45,000 with no outside investors. His wife conceived the name, which means "craziness" or "folly" in French, referring to the difficulty of opening a new establishment in San Francisco's competitive restaurant scene. The restaurant remained a family business, with his wife serving as general manager and his brother as sommelier. La Folie steadily gained in reputation until, by 2000, it was one of only several restaurants in the San Francisco Bay Area, California, to earn a "four star" review from the San Francisco Chronicle. Avoiding "fusion" influences, the establishment was a contemporary French restaurant, with classic French use of stocks and sauces, but lighter than traditional French and with attention to local ingredients. After 32 years in business, La Folie closed in 2020. “It’s bittersweet for me to let it go, but it’s time,” said Passot of the closing. “I’m turning 65 this year. It’s time to let the next generation do their thing.”

Passot joined forces to open Left Bank in 1994, with partner Ed Levine in Larkspur, California. The second Left Bank opened in Menlo Park, California in 1998, and then San Jose in 2003. The restaurants serve French home-style cooking Passot calls "Cuisine Grand-mere". In 2009, the Left Bank restaurant group opened LB Steak, a modern American Steakhouse, in San Jose's Santana Row.

== Influence and awards ==
In style, Passot favors contemporary French cuisine, avoiding fusion, molecular gastronomy, and new devices or techniques such as sous vide. Passot has a reputation for hiring and mentoring young academy-trained chefs. A number of successful restaurant chefs credit Passot as a mentor, or as inspiration, including Richard Reddington, the Michelin starred Chef of REDD in Yountville, CA. Jeffrey Russell, Executive Chef at The Grand America Hotel in Salt Lake City, Trey Foshee of George's at the Cove in La Jolla, California, and Michael Kramer, formerly of McCrady's Restaurant in Charleston, South Carolina and (as of 2008) of Voice Restaurant in Houston, Texas

In 1991 Passot was inducted into the Maitres Cuisiniers de France. His restaurant won the Zagat Survey awards for "Best Food" and "Best Nouvelle French restaurant" in 1998, and "Best French restaurant" in San Francisco, in 2002. He also earned a James Beard Award as "best rising star chef" of 1980, and other "best" designations and awards from USA Today, Food & Wine Magazine, Gourmet magazine, Gault Millau, and SF Weekly. In 2001 the French Government awarded him the "Chevalier dans l’Ordre du Mèrite Agricole".

A local caviar producer, Tsar Nicoulai, has named a product after him.

== Personal life ==
Passot met his wife, Jamie, when she was working at the Four Seasons Resort in Irving, Texas. They have two kids, Charlotte and Jean Paul. Known for being gregarious and social, Passot is a frequent participant in cooking shows and demonstrations, charity events, and television appearances. After gaining weight from the stress of managing his restaurants, he lost 60 pounds by eliminating alcohol, sugar, and starches from his diet.
