= Marie de Villepin =

French model, actress and singer (born 1986)

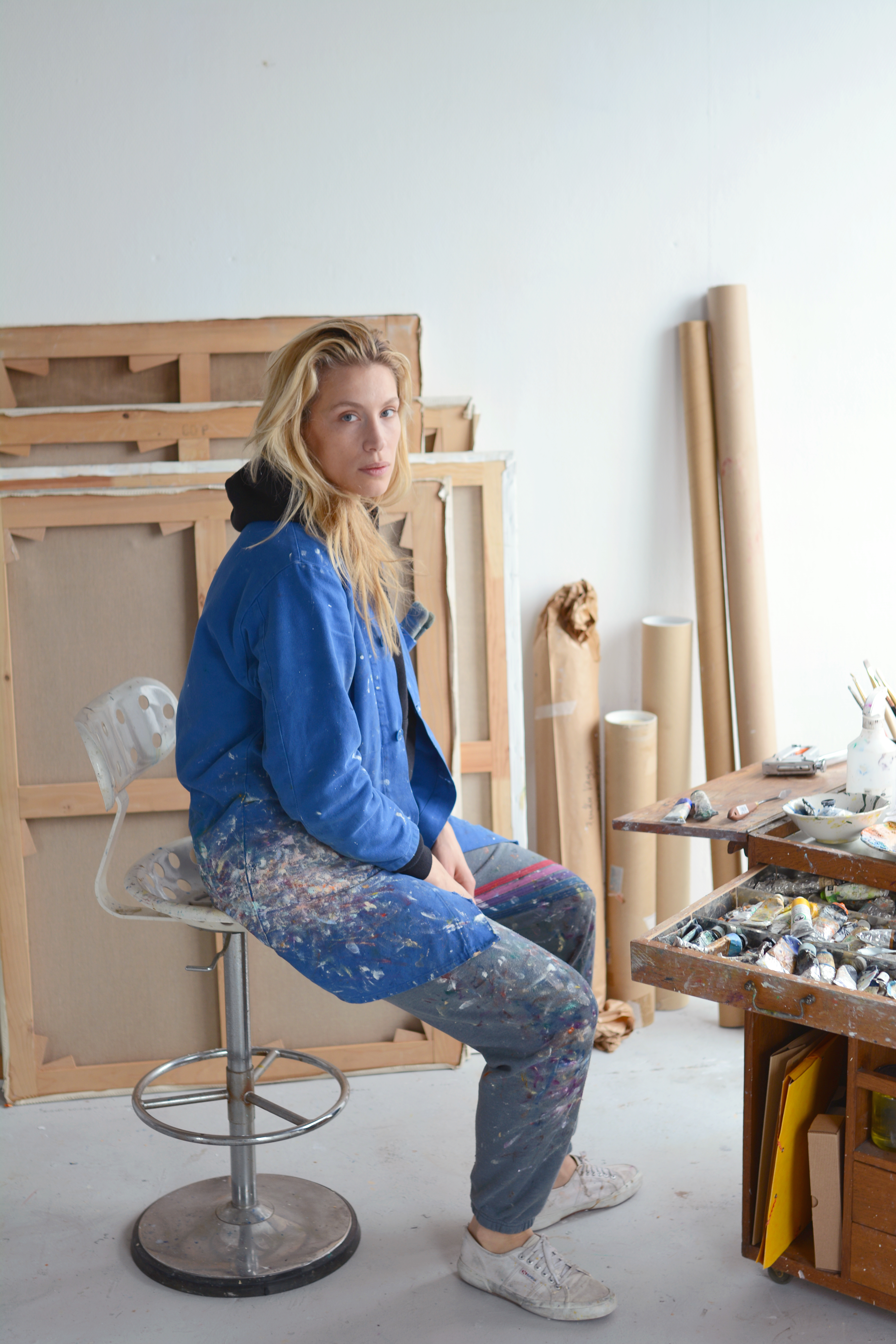
- Born: 8 May 1986 (age 40); Washington, D.C., U.S.
- Occupations: Artist, model, actress, singer
- Father: Dominique de Villepin
- Relatives: Xavier de Villepin (grandfather); Philippe Le Guay (maternal uncle)
- Website: https://www.mariedevillepin.com/

Marie Galouzeau de Villepin (born 8 May 1986) is a French artist, model, actress and singer. The daughter of former Prime Minister and diplomat Dominique de Villepin, she spent most of her childhood in India before moving to various countries in Latin America and Africa.

As a young girl she landed a role in Danièle Thompson's movie La Bûche and then took acting classes at Cours Florent as well as from Raymond Acquaviva, both in Paris. When she turned 18 and after graduating with a degree in applied mathematics from Dauphine University Paris, she moved to New York to pursue a modeling career. After several seasons on the catwalks of New York, Milan and Paris, appearing in ad campaigns of major designers shot by the likes of Mario Sorrenti, Inez and Vinoodh, and Gilles Bensimon, Marie was selected to be the face of Givenchy's perfume Ange ou Démon.

For her starring role in Veit Helmer's Baikonur, shot in the steppes of Kazakhstan and in Moscow, Marie completed a full cosmonaut training course in zero gravity. She has training in kickboxing, Judo, and hi-octane water sports, and has been an equestrian since the age of six.

In 2009 she formed a four-piece band called PINKMIST in which she sings, writes and plays guitar. After recording their first EP they performed many shows all over Europe, including London, Paris, Brussels, and Berlin. She revealed her latest music collaboration in early 2019.

Outside of the entertainment industry, Marie is an artist who participated in a number of group exhibitions in New York, Los Angeles, Beijing, and Hong Kong. She had her first solo exhibition titled New Creatures in Paris in 2019 and she is working as a part of the artist collective of Poush Manifesto (Paris).

== Art ==
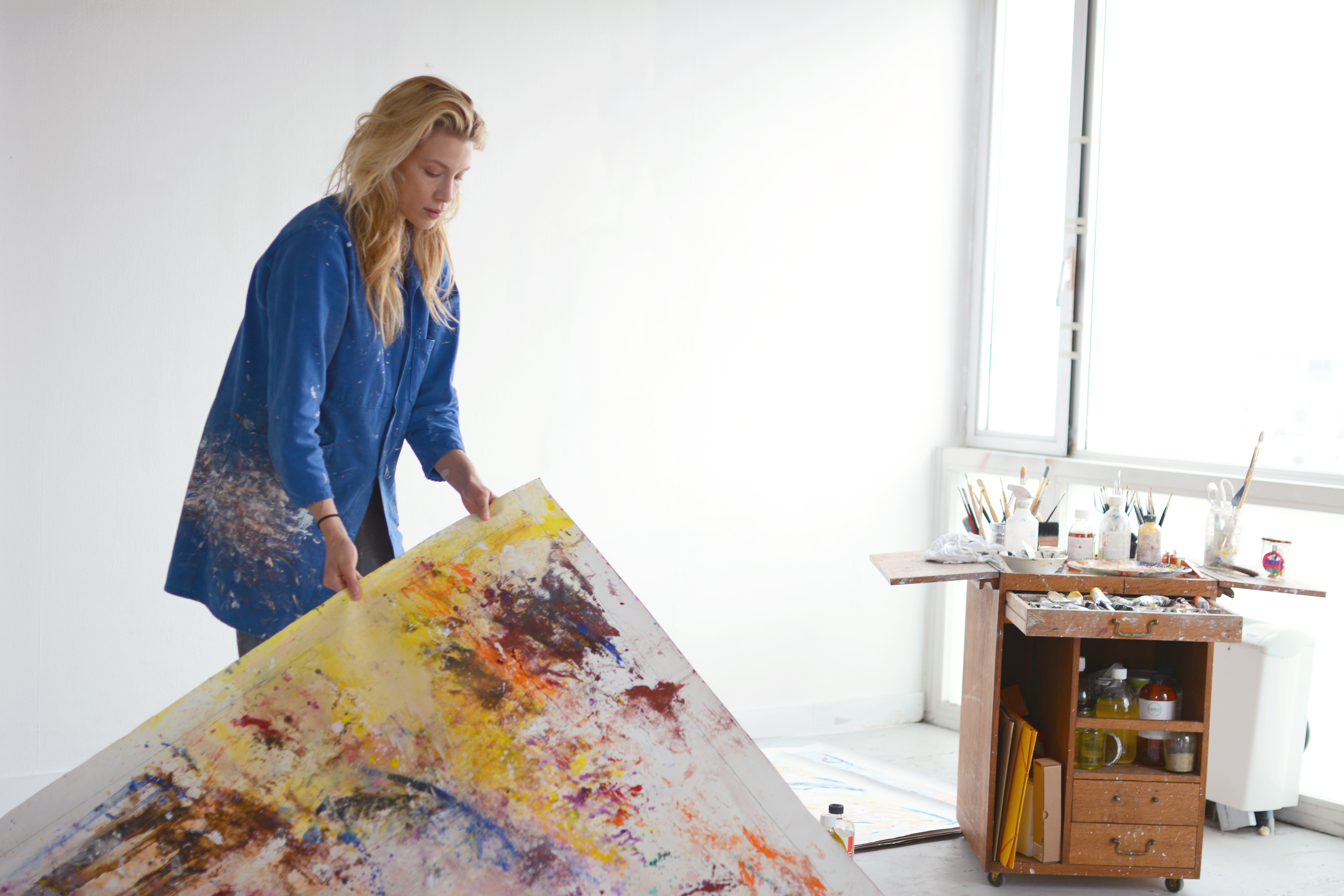
Marie de Villepin at her studio in Paris.

She started daily drawing and sketching after moving to New York, her artworks are strongly influenced by music, she tries to engrave a specific soundtrack in her paintings and often names her works after music. From drawing to oil paintings, her creations are in close resonance with her time and oscillate between figuration and abstraction, and she tries to multiply the possibilities by exploring as diverse mediums as possible besides oil: pencil, charcoal mine, pastels, collage, etc.

Marie's work has been offered at auction multiple times, the record price for this artist at auction was 56,648 USD for Rosebud, sold at Sotheby's Hong Kong in 2021.

In 2022, Marie became one of the 12 selected artists to receive Le Prix Antoine Marin presented at Espace Julio Gonzalez in Arcueil.

== Modeling ==
She was the bride for the French fashion designer Franck Sorbier in his Fall 2004 Couture collection. Her first major breakthrough was a fashion story shot by Gilles Bensimon in the American edition of ELLE in October 2005.

She was the face and the spokesperson of the perfume Ange ou Démon by Givenchy from 2006 to 2010.

In 2007, she was also chosen by Krizia for their Spring and Fall 2007 advertising campaigns. In 2007, she appeared on the catwalk in London at the "Fashion Rocks" event for Christopher Kane.

She currently models in New York under the alias of Marie Steiss. Marie Steiss was on the runway for Krizia in Milan, Spring and Winter 2007 collections; for Givenchy in Paris, Spring 2007 RTW collection. She walked the runway in New York for Diane von Fürstenberg Spring 2006, Winter 2006, Winter 2007 and Spring 2008 collections. She was also featured on the catwalk for Catherine Malandrino and Nicole Romano, Spring 2007 collections; for United Bamboo, Winter 2006 collection. Marie, like both her siblings, is blonde and slender (1.80m, 55 kg). Since her role as Betty Catroux in the movie "Yves Saint Laurent", she has appeared in various fashion magazines.

In 2013, she was the face of the advertising campaign for the "Ardency Inn" makeup brand. She was shot by Claiborne Swanson Frank for a newly released book, Young Hollywood. In 2015, she appeared on the cover of the French summer issue of LUI magazine, partially topless.

== Acting ==
She had a minor career as a child actor, appearing in the Danièle Thompson directorial debut La bûche (English: Season's Beatings) (1999) alongside Sabine Azéma, Emmanuelle Béart and Charlotte Gainsbourg. She had a role as Philippa of Hainault in a French TV miniseries, Les Rois maudits (2005), based on the novels of Maurice Druon.

She had a small part in the Quentin Tarantino film Inglourious Basterds (2009), but her performance was cut during final editing.

She decided to start using her real name - Marie de Villepin - again when she landed her first leading role in the film Baikonur by German director and producer Veit Helmer. She was the face of the "Ardency Inn" makeup brand, for which she modeled, sang, and acted, in 2013.

She also works for "Above Live Video", where she interviews celebrities (including Michelle Rodriguez and Angela Lindvall), as well as writing features and voicing some of the videos.

She co-stars in the short movie directed by Rie Rasmussen "Devouring Art" (Art & Fashion) which premiered on 21 March 2013 online and in print.

In 2013, she played muse Betty Catroux in Jalil Lespert's film "Yves Saint Laurent", released in the U.S. by The Weinstein Company.

In 2014, she portrayed Andréa in a fashion video directed by Julien Landais called Masque d'Or shot in the Grand Trianon's Versailles Palace.

== Music ==
Marie de Villepin is currently the lead singer of the group Pinkmist.

== Modeling agencies ==
IMG models / Why Not model agency (Milan) / Iconic management (Berlin)

== Acting Agencies ==
- Agents Associés Suzy / David Vatinet (PARIS)

== Runway ==
- 2004 Haute Couture Franck Sorbier
- Spring 2006 RTW Diane Von Furstenberg
- Fall 2006 RTW Diane Von Furstenberg / United Bamboo
- Spring 2007 RTW Givenchy /Nicole Romano/Catherine Malandrino/ Krizia
- Fall 2007 RTW Krizia / Diane Von Furstenberg
- Spring 2008 RTW Diane Von Furstenberg

== Advertising campaigns ==
- 2006 / 2010 Givenchy Fragrance "Ange ou Démon"
- 2007 / 2009 Spring and Fall RTW KRIZIA collections
- 2013 Ardency Inn (makeup)

== Films ==
- 1999: Season's Beatings (in French: La Bûche) — Danièle Thompson
- 2005: Les Rois maudits (The Accursed Kings) as Philippa of Hainault (Miniseries, France 2) — Josée Dayan
- 2007: Ange ou Demon perfume commercial for GIVENCHY directed by Mike figgis
- 2010: Baikonur by Veit Helmer - leading role
- 2013: "Devouring Art" by Rie Rasmussen (Short film, Art & fashion)
- 2014: Yves Saint Laurent by Jalil Lespert
- 2014: "Masque d'Or" by Julien Landais - Leading role - Short movie

== Sources ==
- Marie de Villepin in Vs Magazine
- Interview in Le JDD
- interview LUI magazine
- Interview Portrait Liberation
