= Dominique de Villepin =

Prime Minister of France from 2005 to 2007

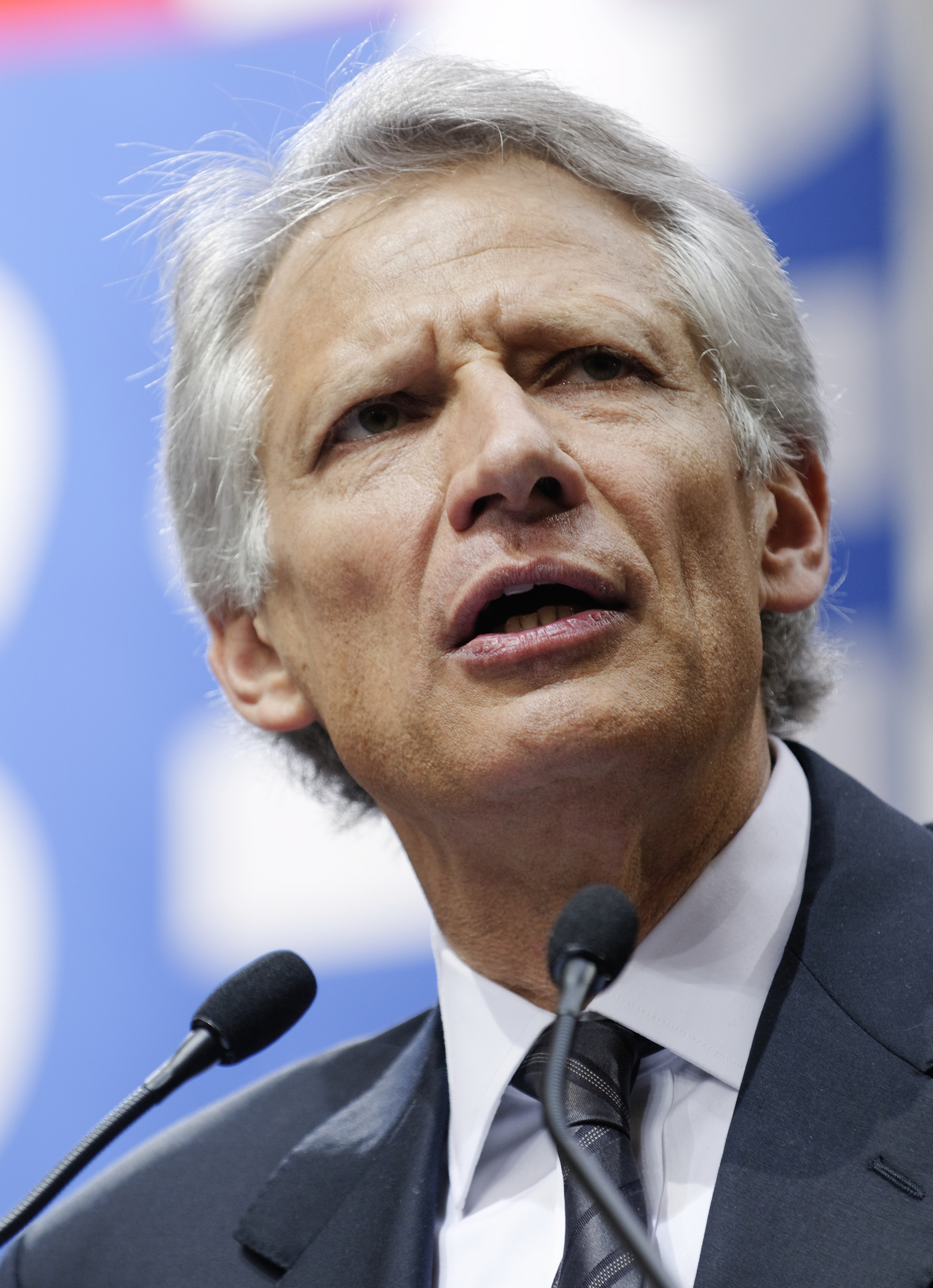
- De Villepin in 2010

Prime Minister of France
- In office 31 May 2005 – 17 May 2007
- President: Jacques Chirac
- Preceded by: Jean-Pierre Raffarin
- Succeeded by: François Fillon

Minister of the Interior
- In office 31 March 2004 – 31 May 2005
- Prime Minister: Jean-Pierre Raffarin
- Preceded by: Nicolas Sarkozy
- Succeeded by: Nicolas Sarkozy

Minister of Foreign Affairs
- In office 7 May 2002 – 31 March 2004
- Prime Minister: Jean-Pierre Raffarin
- Preceded by: Hubert Védrine
- Succeeded by: Michel Barnier

Secretary General to the President
- In office 17 May 1995 – 6 May 2002
- President: Jacques Chirac
- Preceded by: Hubert Védrine
- Succeeded by: Philippe Bas

Personal details
- Born: Dominique Marie François René Galouzeau de Villepin; 14 November 1953 (age 73) Rabat, French Morocco
- Party: Humanist France (2025–present)
- Other political affiliations: Rally for the Republic (1977–2002); Union for a Popular Movement (2002–2010); Solidary Republic (2010–2012)
- Spouse: Marie-Laure Le Guay (m. 1985; div. 2011)
- Children: 3 (including Marie)
- Relatives: Xavier de Villepin (father); Philippe Le Guay (brother-in-law)
- Education: Sciences Po; École nationale d'administration; Panthéon-Assas University; Paris Nanterre University

Dominique Marie François René Galouzeau de Villepin (French pronunciation: [dɔminik maʁi fʁɑ̃swa ʁəne ɡaluzo də vilpɛ̃]; born 14 November 1953) is a French politician who served as Prime Minister of France from 2005 to 2007 under President Jacques Chirac.

In his career working at the Ministry of Foreign Affairs, De Villepin rose through the ranks of the French right as one of Chirac's protégés. He came into the international spotlight as Minister of Foreign Affairs with his opposition to the 2003 invasion of Iraq, one year after his appointment to the office, which culminated with a speech to the United Nations. Before his tenure as prime minister, he also served as Minister of the Interior (2004–2005).

After being replaced by François Fillon as prime minister, De Villepin was indicted in connection with the Clearstream affair; he was subsequently cleared of charges of complicity in allowing false accusations to proceed against presidential rival Nicolas Sarkozy regarding bribes paid on a sale of warships to Taiwan. De Villepin enjoyed a modest return to public favour for his public critique of President Sarkozy's style of "imperial rule".

De Villepin has written poetry, a book about poetry, and several historical and political essays, along with a study of Napoleon. He is an honorary member of the International Raoul Wallenberg Foundation.

== Early life and education ==
Villepin was born in Rabat, Morocco, and spent some time in Venezuela, where his family lived for four years. He then lived in the United States, and has said that he "grew up" there. During his teenage years, "the 'Beat generation' movement left its mark on me, so did the hippie movement". He was inspired by Jack Kerouac and other American poets. He graduated from the Lycée Français de New York in 1971. He was married to Marie-Laure de Villepin from 1985 to 2011, producing three children: Marie (b. 1986), Arthur, and Victoire (b. 1989).

Contrary to what his surname suggests, Villepin is not from an aristocratic background. His ancestors added the particle "de" to the family name. His great-grandfather was a colonel in the French army, his grandfather was a board member for several companies, and his father Xavier de Villepin was a diplomat and a member of the Senate. Villepin speaks French, English and Spanish.

When his mother died, Villepin gave a eulogy "full of the grandest and most sonorous cadences of the French language", according to The Independent in 2010. He "spoke of his mother's passionate belief in the greatness and the destiny of France, and, implicitly, the greatness and destiny of her son". One mourner stated that he seemed to speak "of France and of himself as being the same thing".

== Career ==
=== Diplomat ===
Villepin studied at the Institut d'Études Politiques de Paris (Sciences Po) and went on to the École nationale d'administration (ENA), France's highly selective post-graduate school which trains its top civil servants. Villepin also holds degrees in Civil law and French literature from the universities of Panthéon-Assas and Paris X Nanterre. At the end of his studies, he completed his military service as a naval officer on board the Aircraft Carrier Clemenceau. Villepin then entered a career in diplomacy. His assignments were:

- Advising Committee on African affairs (1980–1984)
- The French embassy in Washington, D.C. (1984–1989), as premier secrétaire until 1987 and then deuxième conseiller
- The embassy in New Delhi (1989–1992), as deuxième conseiller until 1990 and then premier conseiller
- Foreign Ministry's top adviser on Africa (1992–1993)

=== Early political positions ===
Villepin was introduced to Jacques Chirac in the early 1980s and became one of his advisers on foreign policy. In 1993 he became chief of staff (directeur de cabinet) of Alain Juppé, the Foreign Minister in Édouard Balladur's cabinet, who was Chirac's political heir apparent.

Villepin then became director of Chirac's successful 1995 presidential campaign and was rewarded with the key job of Secretary-General of the Élysée Palace during Chirac's first term as President of the Republic (1995–2002). He advised the president to hold an early general election in 1997, while the French National Assembly was overwhelmingly dominated by the president's party. This was a risky gamble, and Chirac's party went on to lose the elections. Villepin offered Chirac his resignation afterwards, but it was turned down. Villepin's flawed advice on the election increased the perception among many politicians on the right that Villepin had no experience or understanding of grassroots politics, and owed his enviable position only to being Chirac's protégé.

Villepin has had an uneasy relationship with the members of his own political side. He has in the past made a number of demeaning remarks about members of parliament from his own party. In addition, the mutual distaste between Villepin and Nicolas Sarkozy, head of the Union for a Popular Movement (UMP) majority party, is well known.

=== Foreign minister ===
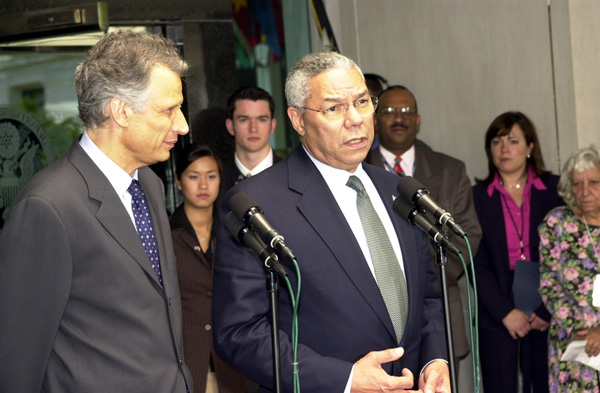
Dominique de Villepin with U.S. Secretary of State Colin Powell, 2003

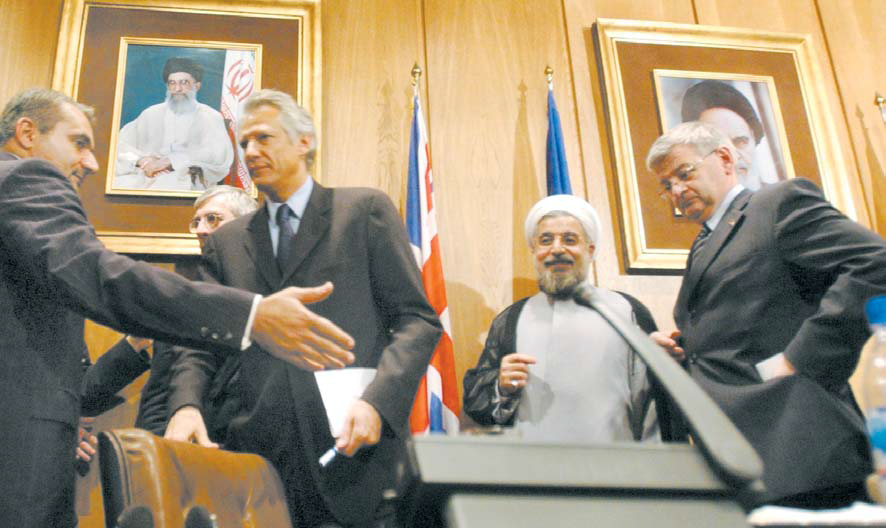
Villepin next to Hassan Rouhani during talks on the Iranian nuclear program

He was appointed Minister of Foreign Affairs by Chirac in the cabinet of Prime Minister Jean-Pierre Raffarin at the beginning of Chirac's second term in 2002.

During the 2004 coup d'état in Haiti, Villepin obtained the backing of the United States Secretary of State, Colin Powell, in his bid to oust Jean-Bertrand Aristide from power.

Villepin's most famous assignment as Chirac's foreign minister was opposing the U.S. plan to invade Iraq, giving France a leading role in the grouping of countries such as Germany, Belgium, Russia and China that opposed the invasion. The speech he gave to the UN to block a second resolution allowing the use of force against Saddam Hussein's regime received loud applause.

During mid-2003 Villepin organized the Opération 14 juillet that attempted to rescue his former student, Ingrid Betancourt, who was being held by FARC rebels in Colombia. The operation failed, and because he had neither informed Colombia, Brazil, nor President Chirac of the mission, it resulted in a political scandal.

=== Interior minister ===
During the cabinet reshuffle that made Nicolas Sarkozy Finance Minister, Villepin was appointed to replace him as interior minister on 31 March 2004.

His actions against radical Islam included mandatory courses for Muslim clerics, notably in the French language (as indications were that one-third of them may not have been fluent in the national language), in moderate Muslim theology and in French secularism: laïcité, Republican principles and the law. While Sarkozy created the French Council of the Muslim Faith as the official representative of Muslims in France, Villepin would have preferred a "Muslim foundation", in which mosque-based representatives would be balanced by secular Muslims.

He also cracked down on radical Muslim clerics, causing an uproar when he tried to expel Abdelkader Bouziane, an imam alleged to have said to the press that, according to Ancient Islamic texts, adulterous people could be whipped or stoned. When the decision to expel him was overturned by the courts, because the journalistic reporting of LyonMag was deemed biased, Villepin pushed a change of the law through Parliament, and Bouziane was sent home.

=== Prime Minister of France ===
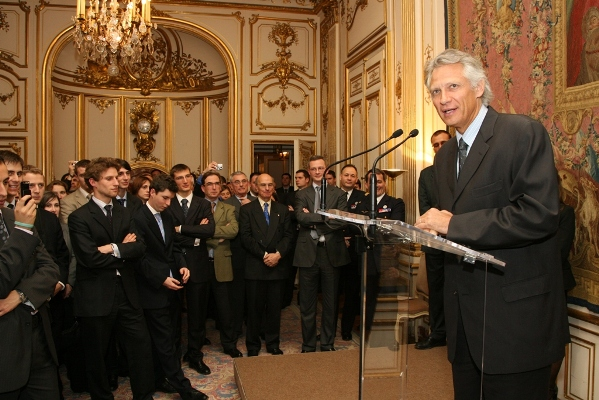
Villepin speaking at the Hôtel Matignon in 2006

President Chirac was at one point thought to have turned his eye on Villepin as a possible successor, assuming that he himself would not enter the 2007 presidential contest. However, Nicolas Sarkozy was chosen to represent the centre-right UMP party.

On 29 May 2005, French voters in the referendum on the Treaty establishing a Constitution for Europe turned down the proposed document by a wide margin. Two days later, Raffarin resigned and Chirac appointed Villepin as Prime Minister of France.

==== Villepin's cabinet ====
In an address to the nation, Chirac had declared that the new cabinet's top priority would be to curb unemployment, which was consistently hovering above 10%, calling for a "national mobilization" to that effect.

Villepin's cabinet was marked by its small membership (for France), and its hierarchical unity: all members had the rank of Minister, and there were no Secretaries of State, the lowest cabinet member rank. The aim of this decision was for the cabinet to form a close-knit and more efficient team to combat unemployment.

The economy was growing sluggishly and a significant drop in unemployment was yet to be seen. Villepin's aim was therefore to restore the French people's trust in their government, an achievement for which he publicly set himself a deadline of a hundred days from the appointment of cabinet.

Another issue was the European Constitution, rejected by France and the Netherlands in referendums.

After Pope Benedict XVI was widely chastized for appearing to criticize Islam in a speech on 12 September 2006, French author Robert Redeker came to the pontiff's defense, in response to which he received death threats that forced him and his family to go into hiding. Villepin commented that "everyone has the right to express their opinions freely – at the same time that they respect others, of course". The lesson of this episode, according to Villepin, was "how vigilant we must be to ensure that people fully respect one another in our society".

Some had speculated that Villepin, with his diplomatic experience and the prestige associated with the job of prime minister, would negotiate a new treaty with the European Union, while Sarkozy would run the country at home. However, Villepin obtained favorable reviews from the press and temporarily increased popularity in polls. In particular, he was increasingly cited as a possible presidential candidate for 2007, although Nicolas Sarkozy had publicly stated that he himself was giving considerable attention to that election. Villepin and Sarkozy initially avoided any open division.

Villepin declared that lowering unemployment was the number one objective of his government (which had also been stated by other prime ministers before him, albeit to no avail). He, as well as the UMP party, believed that France's workforce rules were too rigid and discouraged employment, and that some liberalizing reforms were necessary in order to "correct" the French social model.

On 2 August 2005 he issued ordinances establishing a new kind of work contract (called CNE) for small enterprises, with fewer guarantees than ordinary contracts. While Villepin's measures would surely have been approved by his wide UMP majority in Parliament. Villepin said the government needed to act fast, especially when Parliament was going on its summer recess.

On 16 January 2006 he announced a similar kind of work contract (called Contrat première embauche, or CPE) for young people (under 26). The parliament approved on 8 February. Subsequently, students started to protest. This wave of protest eventually forced the government to give in. Although the law on the CPE is formally still valid, the government promised to hinder its application and initiated a new legal initiative which will abolish the key points of the CPE. During the protests, Villepin was widely perceived as stubborn and arrogant. As a consequence, his popularity rates went down rapidly and he was no longer regarded as a serious contender for the 2007 presidential election.

Another major issue in Villepin's government was the state of the national budget. France runs high deficits, which run afoul of the rules set in the EU Maastricht Treaty. Villepin's margin of maneuver in that respect was extremely slim.

===== Cabinet membership =====
- Dominique de Villepin – prime minister

Ministers

- Nicolas Sarkozy – Minister of State, Minister of the Interior
- Michèle Alliot-Marie – Minister of Defence
- Philippe Douste-Blazy – Minister of Foreign Affairs
- Jean-Louis Borloo – Minister of Employment, Social Cohesion and Housing
- Thierry Breton – Minister of the Economy, Finance and Industry
- Gilles de Robien – Minister of National Education
- Pascal Clément – Keeper of the Seals, Minister of Justice
- Dominique Perben – Minister of Transportation, Equipment, Tourism and the Sea
- Xavier Bertrand – Minister of Health and Solidarity
- Dominique Bussereau – Minister of Agriculture and Fishing
- Christian Jacob – Minister of Civil Service
- Renaud Donnedieu de Vabres – Minister of Culture and Communication
- Nelly Olin – Minister of Ecology and Sustainable Development
- François Baroin – Minister of Overseas France
- Renaud Dutreil – Minister of Small Businesses, Commerce, Craftsmanship and Self-Employed Professionals
- Jean-François Lamour – Minister of Youth, Sports, and Associative Life

Delegate ministers

- Henri Cuq, delegate minister for relationships with Parliament;
- Azouz Begag, delegate minister for equal opportunities;
- Jean-François Copé, delegate minister for budget and the reform of the State, spokesman for the Government;
- Gérard Larcher, delegate minister for employment, work, and the professional insertion of the young;
- Catherine Vautrin, delegate minister for social cohesion and parity [of the sexes];
- Brigitte Girardin, delegate minister for international cooperation, development and francophonie;
- Brice Hortefeux, delegate minister for local governments;
- Catherine Colonna, delegate minister for European affairs;
- François Goulard, delegate minister for higher education and research;
- Léon Bertrand, delegate minister for tourism;
- Philippe Bas, delegate minister for Social Security, the elderly, the handicapped, and the family;
- François Loos, delegate minister for industry;
- Christine Lagarde, delegate minister for foreign commerce;
- Hamlaoui Mékachéra, delegate minister for war veterans;
- Christian Estrosi, delegate minister for the management of the territory.

===== Shuffles =====
26 March 2007:

- Nicolas Sarkozy ceases to be Minister of the Interior and is replaced by François Baroin.
- François Baroin ceases to be Minister of Overseas France and is replaced by Hervé Mariton.
- Xavier Bertrand ceases to be Minister of Health and Solidarity and is replaced by Philippe Bas.

5 April 2007:

- Azouz Begag ceases to be delegate Minister for equal opportunities and is not replaced.

==== Contrat Première Embauche and strikes ====
On Thursday, 16 March 2006, tens of thousands of French university and school students marched to demand the government scrap a contentious youth jobs clause, known as First Employment Contract (CPE). The law, intended as a response to the 2005 riots, was intended to stimulate job growth and reduce the country's high youth unemployment rate by allowing employers to fire employees aged under 26 within the first two years of their employment for any or no reason. Supporters of the law argued that such probationary arrangements are not unusual in Western countries and that the current system in France discourages employers from hiring people whom they may be unable to fire if they prove unsuitable for the job. Critics argued that the CPE discriminated unnecessarily against the young and decreases job security. The union movement issued an ultimatum to Villepin to scrap the law by 20 March or face a general strike. This ultimatum expired without concession. A general strike was called for 28 March.

On 28 March, between one and three million people demonstrated across France. The protests were accompanied by some violence and 800 people were arrested, 500 of them in Paris. Prime Minister Villepin refused to withdraw the CPE but called for negotiations on adapting it. The demonstrators for the most part called for the complete withdrawal of the CPE.

The CPE was withdrawn by Jacques Chirac on 10 April.

==== 2006 National Assembly debate ====
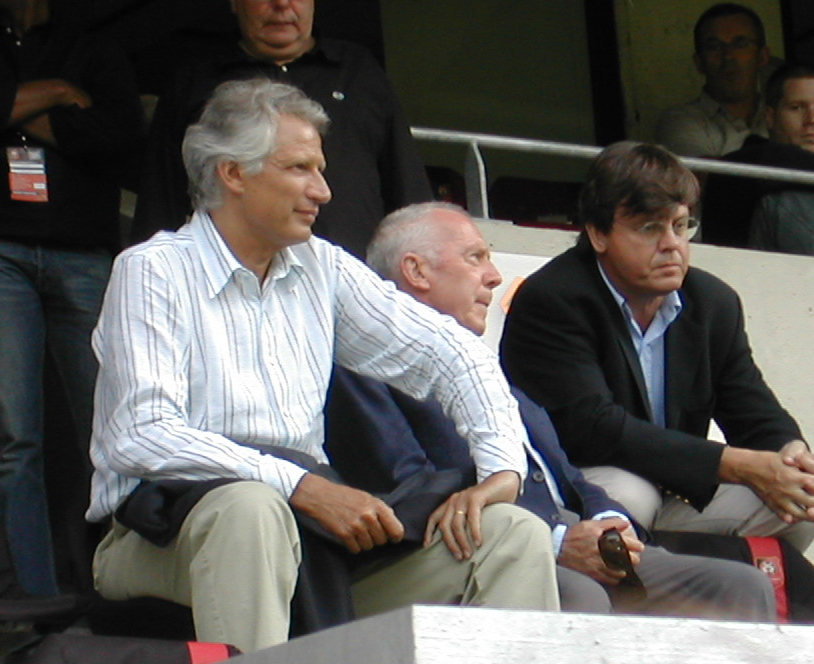
Dominique de Villepin, 2006

On 20 June 2006, during the questions to government in the National Assembly, Dominique de Villepin accused the head of the Socialist Party François Hollande of cowardice. Hollande had questioned the Prime Minister about the recent "insider trading" scandal involving the aerospace company EADS and executive Noël Forgeard. This triggered an incident in the Assembly, with Socialist deputies converging on the government benches until they were stopped by the Assembly ushers. Hollande demanded apologies and the resignation of the Prime Minister; the next day, Dominique de Villepin apologized. This event resulted in criticism even from Villepin's own UMP party, with UMP parliamentarians including Assembly vice-president Yves Bur suggesting that president Chirac should appoint another prime minister.

==== Clearstream affair ====
In 2004, French judges were given a list by an anonymous source containing the names of politicians and others who, it was alleged, had deposited kickbacks from a 1991 arms sale to Taiwan into secret accounts at Clearstream, a private bank in Luxembourg. The most prominent name on the list was that of Nicolas Sarkozy, Villepin's rival for power in the UMP. The list was later shown to be fraudulent, a discovery Villepin kept from the public for 15 months at a time when the two men were vying for party supremacy. Meanwhile, the source of the list was later revealed to be a longtime associate of Villepin's, one Jean-Louis Gergorin, an executive at EADS. Critics claimed that Villepin, perhaps with the support of then-president Jacques Chirac, had tried to defame his rival. Sarkozy, in turn, filed a suit against whoever was behind the creation of the Clearstream list. Villepin was eventually acquitted in 2010 (see #Clearstream trial below).

==== Possible presidential bid ====
There was speculation that Villepin might be a candidate in the 2007 Presidential election; Interior minister Nicolas Sarkozy was selected unopposed as the UMP's presidential candidate on 14 January 2007. On 12 March 2007 Villepin formally endorsed Sarkozy for President.

=== Resignation ===
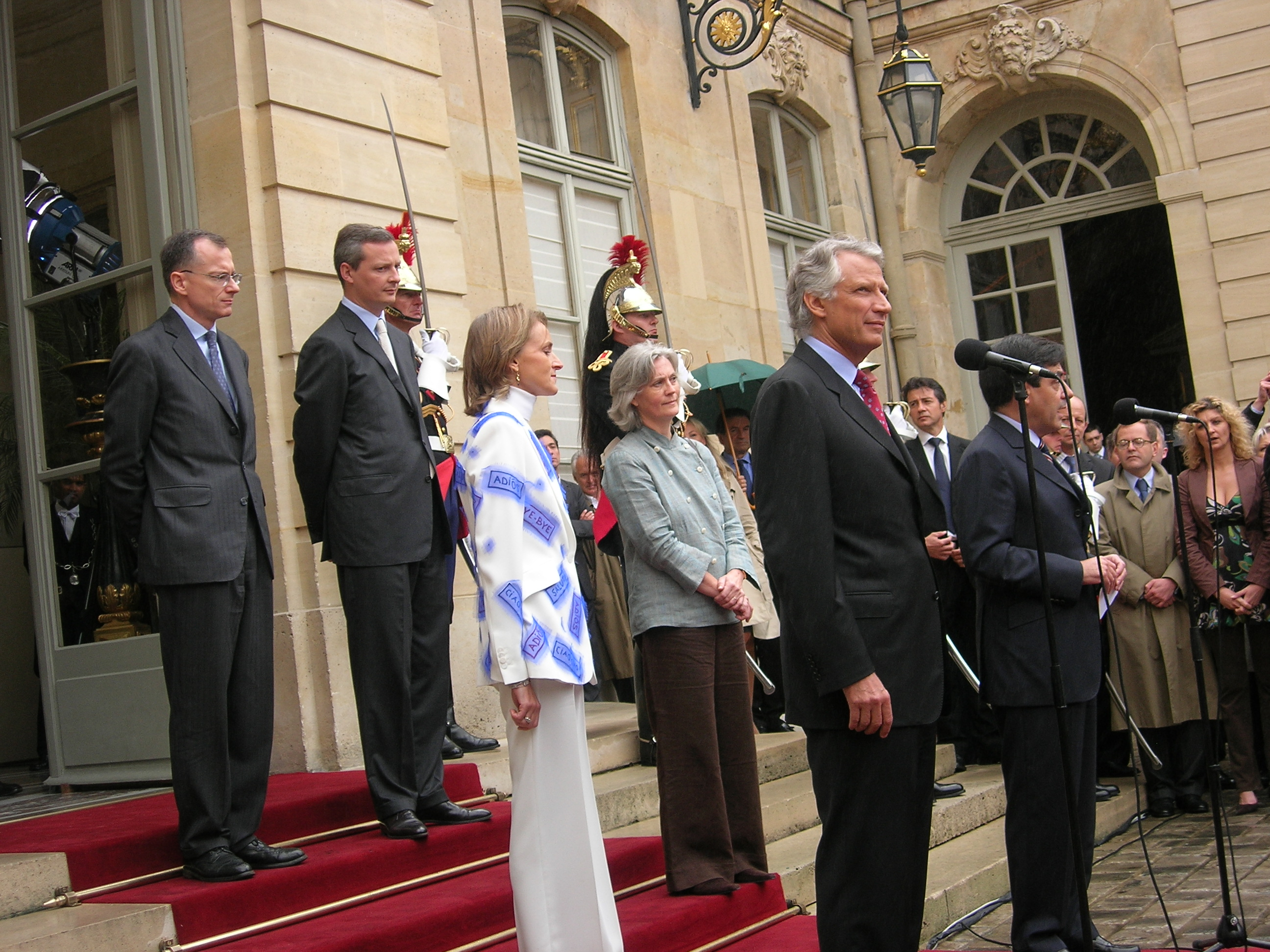
Dominique de Villepin after his resignation

On 15 May 2007, the last full day of President Jacques Chirac's term, Villepin tendered his resignation from the office of prime minister and it was accepted by the President. He was replaced two days later by François Fillon.

== Post-prime ministerial career ==
=== Context of De Villepin's political career ===
De Villepin has never held elected office; the French Constitution allows the president to appoint unelected ministers. This is a political liability for him, because he is periodically accused of being out of touch with the realities of ordinary citizens. He is also reported to despise elected officials, calling members of Parliament connards (assholes). Villepin is not the first "unelected" prime minister, even in the relatively short history of the Fifth Republic: notable predecessors include Georges Pompidou, who was a banker before being called to office, and Raymond Barre, who had a previous career as a professor and appointed official, and started an elected career only after being Prime minister.

=== Clearstream trial ===
On the first day of the civil trial for his part in the Clearstream affair, Villepin accused President Sarkozy of pursuing him for political reasons. Sarkozy has the status of a civil plaintiff in the case.

On Thursday, 28 January 2010, the judgement was finally handed down and Villepin was acquitted of every accusation against him in the affair. The following morning the prosecution announced that it would file an appeal against this verdict, thus further dragging out the affair another year. Villepin was finally cleared by an appeals court in September 2011.

=== Career as advocate ===
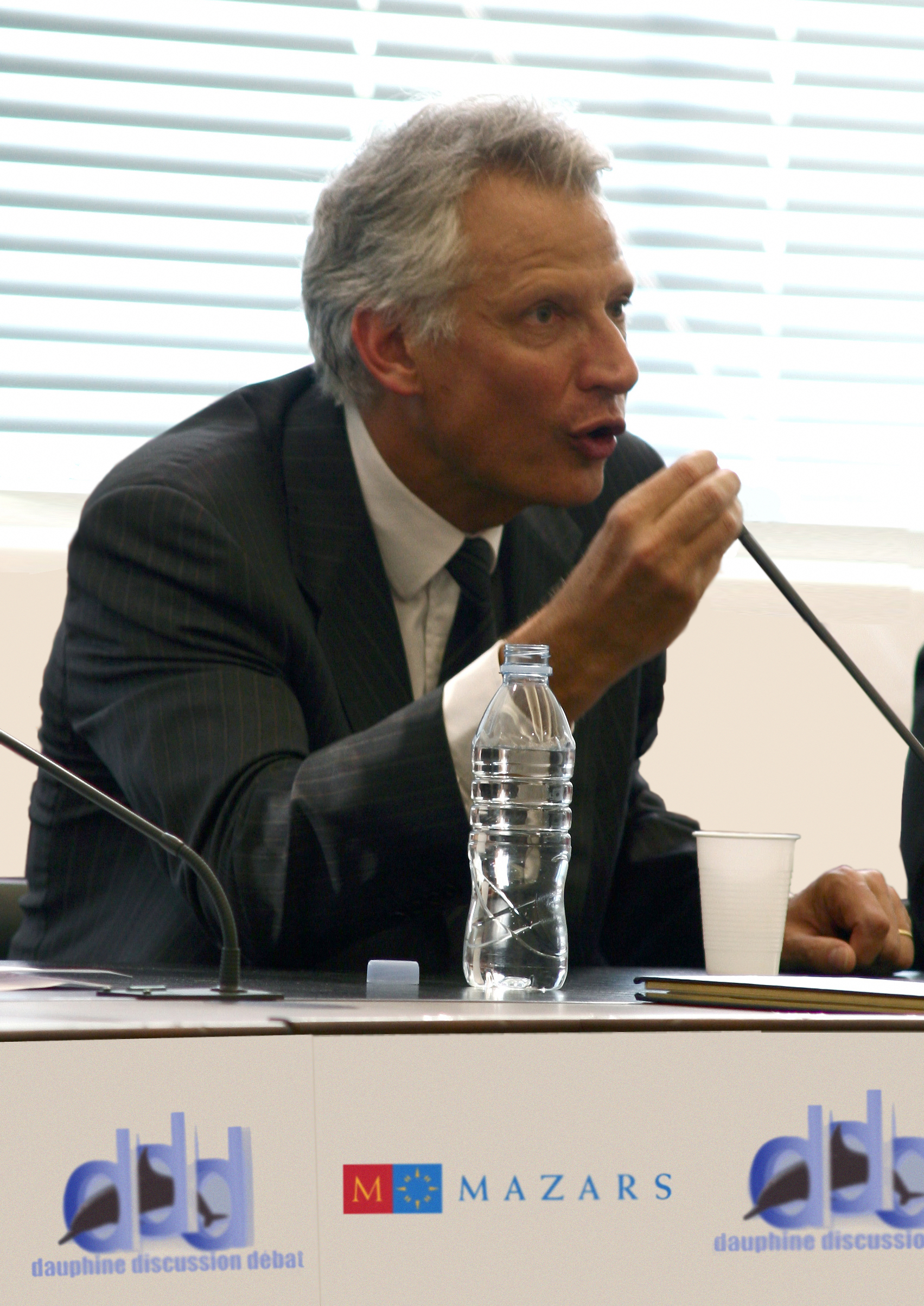
Villepin speaking at Paris Dauphine University, 2008

Soon after his exit from daily political life, on 9 January 2008 de Villepin returned to legal practice. Since then, he has travelled on business to Iran, Argentina, Venezuela and Colombia. Over its first two years, the bureau had revenues of 4.65 million euros and earned profit of 2.6 million. Alstom, TotalEnergies and Veolia and the Bugshan family conglomerate have all been clients. and he has a close relationship with Al-Mayassa bint Hamad bin Khalifa Al-Thani and her mother Moza bint Nasser. He advocated forcefully the Palestinian cause during the 2014 Israel–Gaza conflict, at the request of the Qataris, and protested the French legal ban on Islamic facial veils for women in 2014. De Villepin counsels the Qatar Investment Authority. He is president of the advisory board of Universal Credit Rating Group, a Sino-Russo-American bond credit rating agency, and international advisor to China Minsheng Bank.

From November 2008 until June 2009, de Villepin chaired a six-member panel of EU experts advising the Bulgarian government. Set up by Bulgaria's prime minister Sergei Stanishev, the advisory board was mandated to recommend ways to help the country adjust to EU membership.

=== République Solidaire and presidential run ===
In 2010, Villepin quit the UMP and set up a new party, République Solidaire, with the aim of running for president in the 2012 elections. He advocated the rewithdrawal of France from the NATO integrated military command. However, he failed to secure the 500 necessary "parrainages" endorsements from elected officials in the preliminaries to the presidential race, and his candidacy did not proceed.

In 2016, the French investigating judge Sabine Kheris requested that a case be referred to the Court of Justice of the Republic. Three former ministers, Dominique de Villepin, Michel Barnier and Michèle Alliot-Marie, were suspected of having allowed the exfiltration of the mercenaries responsible for the attack on the Bouaké camp in 2004, killing nine French soldiers. The operation was allegedly intended to justify a response operation against the Laurent Gbagbo government in the context of the 2004 crisis in Ivory Coast.

=== 2017 presidential election ===
In the 2017 presidential election, De Villepin endorsed centrist Emmanuel Macron before the first round and not fellow right-winger François Fillon, candidate of The Republicans.

=== Art gallery ===
In March 2020, Dominique de Villepin opened a commercial gallery in Hong Kong together with his son, Arthur de Villepin. The gallery is located on Hollywood Road in Central, and opened with an inaugural exhibition of work by the Chinese painter Zao Wou-ki.

=== 2024 legislative election ===
In the wake of the dissolution of the National Assembly by Emmanuel Macron, de Villepin, architect of the 1997 dissolution, lamented his decision to seek new elections, and said that his second quinquennat merely "float[ed in the] absence of clear ideas," but nonetheless called for a moderate coalition. Distancing himself from Éric Ciotti and his decision to cooperate with the far-right, while de Villepin did not explicitly specify he would vote for the New Popular Front over the National Rally, he did say that "I consider that priority must be given to the struggle against the National Rally[, ] the real threat to our country."

=== Humanist France ===
De Villepin launched a new political party on 24 June 2025 called Humanist France (in French: La France Humaniste). He said in an interview with Le Parisien that too many French political parties were populist, one-upping each other, and stigmatising. He wanted France to move away from polarising identity politics. He opened his party up to any political view in order to bring citizens together to "defend social justice and the republican order". He said voters deserve choice, and not be stuck "between the radicalism of the LFI and the RN". He lamented the state of the world as more dangerous "without rules, without international law, where the law of the jungle, the law of the strongest prevails." Polling shows him to be one of the most popular politicians in France. A BVA poll indicated that he was pulling most of his support from La France Insoumise. However, other polling puts him far down in preferences.

2027 Presidential election

In November 2026, he announced his campaign for the 2027 Presidential election

== Personal life ==
Villepin enjoys traveling through the U.S., and has spoken of Route 66 as giving a feeling of the "wide open spaces of America" that signify "dreams and opportunities". He has said that the U.S. is a source of inspiration for "every lover of liberty and democracy".

De Villepin has been living in an apartment near the Place de l’Etoile in Paris since 2022. His art collection includes works by Anselm Kiefer, Miquel Barceló, Zao Wou-Ki and Yan Pei-Ming.

== Quotes ==
- L'option de la guerre peut apparaître a priori la plus rapide. Mais n'oublions pas qu'après avoir gagné la guerre, il faut construire la paix. "The option of war might seem at first to be the swiftest. But let us not forget that having won the war, one has to build peace." (address on Iraq at the United Nations Security Council on 14 February 2003, shortly before the US-led invasion of Iraq)
- With the collapse of Saddam Hussein's regime, a dark era is drawing to a close. And we welcome it... Together we must now build peace in Iraq and for France this has to mean the United Nations having a central role. Together we must build peace throughout the region and this can be done only through the determined search for a settlement of the Israeli-Palestinian conflict.
- Let us have the courage to declare a first truth: International law does not give a right to security which engages, in return, a right to occupy and even less so, a right to massacre. There is a right to peace, and that right is the same for all peoples. The security which Israel seeks today, is done so against peace and against the Palestinian people.

== Honours ==
=== French national honours ===
- Commander of the Legion of Honour (2023)
- Grand Cross in the National Order of Merit (2005)

=== Foreign honours ===
- Grand Officer of the Order of Merit of the Italian Republic (Italy, 2000).
- Grand Officer of the Order of the Three Stars (Latvia, 1997).
- Commander's Grand Cross of the Order of the Lithuanian Grand Duke Gediminas (Lithuania, 1998).
- Grand Commander of the Order for Merits to Lithuania (Lithuania, 2004).
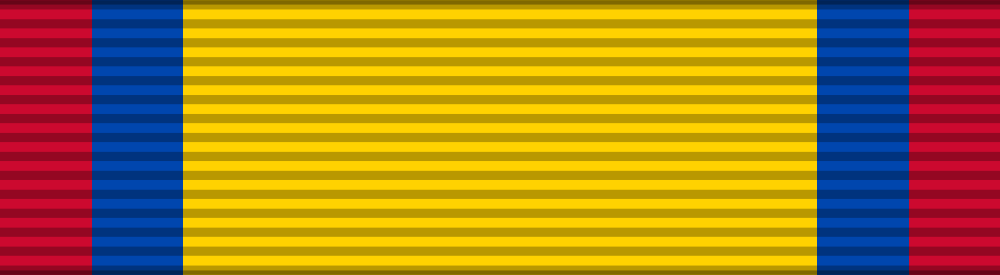
- First Class of the Order of the Glory of Labor (Moldova, 2010).
- Grand Officer of the Order of Saint-Charles (Monaco, 1997).
- Grand Cross of the Royal Norwegian Order of Merit (Norway, 2000).
- Commander's Cross with Star of the Order of Merit of the Republic of Poland (Poland, 2000).
- Grand Cross of the Order of Prince Henry (Portugal, 1999).
- Grand Officer of the Order of the Star of Romania (Romania, 1999).
- Grand Cross of the Order of Civil Merit (Spain, 2006).
- Medal of the Oriental Republic of Uruguay (Uruguay, 1996).

== Bibliography ==
- 2001: Les Cent-Jours ou l'esprit de sacrifice (Perrin, 2001 – Le Grand livre du mois, 2001 – Perrin, 2002 – Éditions France loisirs, 2003); a book about the "One Hundred Days" between the return of Napoleon from Elba and the defeat at the Battle of Waterloo; awarded the Grand Prix d'Histoire of the Fondation Napoléon (2001) and the Prix des Ambassadeurs (2001).
- 2002: Le cri de la gargouille (Éditions Albin Michel, 2002. Librairie générale française, 2003), a "meditation" upon French politics, an analysis of differing aspects of the French political character.
- 2003: Éloge des voleurs de feu (NRF-Gallimard, 2003), in English On Poetry, which is some reflections on the subject; Villepin is said to have worked on the final draft during the UN session where the French successfully blocked authorization of the 2003 War in Iraq.
- 2003: Un autre monde (l'Herne, 2003), preface by Stanley Hoffmann, translator, Toward a new world: speeches, essays, and interviews on the war in Iraq, the UN, and the changing face of Europe (Melville House Publishing, c2004), a selection of speeches by Villepin as Foreign Minister, with commentary by Hoffman, Susan Sontag, Carlos Fuentes, Norman Mailer, Régis Debray, Mario Vargas Llosa, and others.
- 2003: Preface to Aventuriers du monde 1866–1914 : Les grands explorateurs français au temps des premiers photographes (L'Iconoclaste, 2003), collective work.
- 2004: Preface to l'Entente cordiale de Fachoda à la Grande Guerre : Dans les archives du Quai d'Orsay, Maurice Vaïsse (Éditions Complexe, 2004).
- 2004: Preface, with Jack Straw, to l'Entente cordiale dans le siècle (Odile Jacob, 2004).
- 2004: Preface to 1905, la séparation des Églises et de l'État : les textes fondateurs (Perrin, 2004).
- 2004: Preface to Mehdi Qotbi : le voyage de l'écriture (Paris : Somogy, 2004 – Paris : Somogy, 2005), "published on the occasion of an exhibition organized by the Institut Français du Nord and Attijariwafa Bank, presented at the Galerie Delacroix of the Institut français du Nord at Tangiers from 25 June to 5 September 2004 and at the Espace d'Art Actua of the Attijariwafa Bank, Casablanca, Oct–Dec 2004" – Villepin has a personal connection with the Maghreb and the Third World – "born in Rabat, raised in Latin America", as the bios put it;
- 2004: Le requin et la mouette (Plon : A. Michel, 2004), essay.
- 2005: Histoire de la diplomatie française with Jean-Claude Allain, Françoise Autrand, Lucien Bély (Perrin, 2005).
- 2005: L'Homme européen, with Jorge Semprún (Plon, 2005 – Perrin, octobre 2005), a pamphlet in favour of the Treaty establishing a constitution for Europe.
- 2005: Urgences de la poésie ([Casablanca] : Eds. de la Maison de la Poésie du Maroc, July 2005) tr. into Arabic by Mohamed Bennis, illustr. by Mehdi Qotbi; includes three poems by Villepin himself, "Elegies barbares", "Le droit d'aînesse", and "Sécession".
- 2006:, The Globalist, 3 March 2006.
- 2016: Mémoire de paix pour temps de guerre (Paris: Grasset).

== See also ==
- List of foreign ministers of France
- List of interior ministers of France
- List of prime ministers of France
- Politics of France
- The comic book Quai d'Orsay was based on the author's experience as a speechwriter in Villepin's Ministry of Foreign Affairs.
  - The comic book was adapted as the 2013 film Quai d'Orsay, featuring Thierry Lhermitte as the French Foreign Minister.

Political offices
| Preceded by Hubert Védrine | Secretary General to the President; 1995–2002 | Succeeded by Philippe Bas |
| Preceded by Hubert Védrine | Minister of Foreign Affairs; 2002–2004 | Succeeded by Michel Barnier |
| Preceded by Nicolas Sarkozy | Minister of the Interior; 2004–2005 | Succeeded by Nicolas Sarkozy |
| Preceded by Jean-Pierre Raffarin | Prime Minister of France; 2005–2007 | Succeeded by François Fillon |
Order of precedence
| Preceded by Jean-Pierre Raffarin as former Prime Minister | Order of precedence of France; Former Prime Minister | Succeeded by François Fillon as former Prime Minister |
