= Borotra =

Borotra is a surname. Notable people with the surname include:

- Didier Borotra (1937–2024), French politician
- Franck Borotra (born 1937), French politician, twin brother of Didier and nephew of Jean
- Jean Borotra (1898–1994), French tennis player
