= Michèle Alliot-Marie =

French politician (born 1946)

Michèle Alliot-Marie MEP
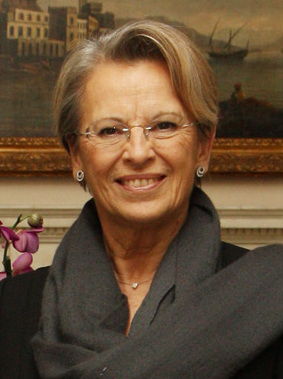

Member of the European Parliament
- In office 1 July 2014 – 1 July 2019
- In office 1 July 1989 – 22 May 1992
- Constituency: East France

Minister of Foreign and European Affairs
- In office 14 November 2010 – 27 February 2011
- Prime Minister: François Fillon
- Preceded by: Bernard Kouchner
- Succeeded by: Alain Juppé

Minister of Justice
- In office 23 June 2009 – 13 November 2010
- Prime Minister: François Fillon
- Preceded by: Rachida Dati
- Succeeded by: Michel Mercier

Minister of the Interior
- In office 18 May 2007 – 23 June 2009
- Prime Minister: François Fillon
- Preceded by: François Baroin
- Succeeded by: Brice Hortefeux

Minister of Defence
- In office 7 May 2002 – 18 May 2007
- Prime Minister: Jean-Pierre Raffarin; Dominique de Villepin
- Preceded by: Alain Richard
- Succeeded by: Hervé Morin

Minister of Youth Affairs and Sports
- In office 29 March 1993 – 18 May 1995
- Prime Minister: Édouard Balladur
- Preceded by: Frédérique Bredin
- Succeeded by: Guy Drut

Member of the National Assembly for Pyrénées-Atlantiques's 6th constituency
- In office 16 March 1986 – 1 May 1993
- Succeeded by: Daniel Poulou
- In office 17 September 1995 – 18 June 2002
- Preceded by: Daniel Poulou
- Succeeded by: Daniel Poulou

Personal details
- Born: Michèle Yvette Marie-Thérèse Jeanne Honorine Marie; 10 September 1946 (age 80) Villeneuve-le-Roi, France
- Party: European People's Party (1989-1992, 2014-present); The Republicans (2015–present)
- Other political affiliations: Rally for the Republic (before 2002); Union for a Popular Movement (2002–2015)
- Spouse: Michel Alliot (m. 1971; div. 1984)
- Domestic partner: Patrick Ollier
- Children: 3
- Education: Panthéon-Assas University; Pantheon-Sorbonne University

Michèle Yvette Marie-Thérèse Jeanne Honorine Alliot-Marie (French: [miʃɛl aljomaʁi]; née Marie; born 10 September 1946), known in France as MAM, is a French politician and Member of the European Parliament (MEP) from France. She is a member of the Republicans, part of the European People's Party. A member of all right-wing governments formed in the 1980s, 1990s and 2000s, she was the first woman in France to hold the portfolios of Defense (2002–2007), the Interior (2007–2009) and Foreign Affairs (2010–2011); she has also been in charge of Youth and Sports (1993–1995) and Justice (2009–2010), and was granted the honorary rank of Minister of State in her last two offices.

She resigned from government in 2011 due to her position during the Tunisian Revolution; one year later, in the 2012 French legislative elections, she lost her seat as Deputy (MP) for the 6th Constituency of Pyrénées-Atlantiques. She became a member of the European Parliament in 2014. She remains Deputy Mayor of Saint-Jean-de-Luz as well as Vice President of the National Council of The Republicans.

Alliot-Marie was the last President of the Rally for the Republic (1999–2002), an incarnation of the Gaullist party, and was the first woman to chair a major French political party. She has remained a leading Gaullist after the RPR merged into the UMP and was seen as a rival to Nicolas Sarkozy before and after his election as president in 2007, although direct confrontation was always avoided.

Alliot-Marie is a law and political science scholar. Her companion is Patrick Ollier, Minister in charge of Relations with Parliament in the Fillon II government; both were ministers simultaneously for a few months in 2010–2011, the first time a couple ever sat in a French government.

== Early life ==
Michèle Marie was born on 10 September 1946 in Villeneuve-le-Roi (then in the Seine-et-Oise department, now in the Val-de-Marne department since 1968). Her father is Bernard Marie (1918–2015), who was a famous international rugby referee, the French National Assembly Deputy for the Pyrénées-Atlantiques' 4th constituency (1967–1981, department named Basses-Pyrénées until 1969), and the Mayor of Biarritz (1977–1991); and her mother is Renée Leyko and is of Polish descent.

She attended the High School of the Folie Saint James in Neuilly-sur-Seine and then began her studies at the Paris Law Faculty in the now-defunct University of Paris, continuing at the Faculté des lettres de Paris in that same university. After then-Education Minister Edgar Faure's university reforms (known as Loi Faure) were implemented in 1968, she continued her studies in private law, political science, and legal history at both Panthéon-Assas University, earning a Doctor of Law degree there in 1973 with her thesis Salarié actionnaire (English: "Employee Shareholders"), and Pantheon-Sorbonne University, where she earned a Doctorate in political science in 1982 and defended her thesis Décisions politiques et structures administratives (English: "Political Decisions and Administrative Structures"). During her university years, she was a member of the right-wing student union UNI.

She also holds a Certificat d'aptitude à la profession d'avocat (English: "Certificate of Aptitude for Practicing Law"), also known as a CAPA; a certificate in African laws and economics; and a master's degree in ethnology. Before her career in politics, she was a senior lecturer at the Paris-I University (Panthéon-Sorbonne), and also spent some time practicing law. She is also a recipient of the Faculty of Law and Economics.

== University, private sector, and early political career ==
During her university studies, Alliot-Marie (then still known as Michèle Marie) began having a relationship with her then-law professor Michel Alliot, who was also chief of staff to then-Education Minister (1968-1969) Edgar Faure. Marie and Alliot married in 1971, thus gaining her frequent access to academic and corporate environments; this also led to a name change from Michèle Marie to her name since then, Michèle Alliot-Marie.

She was first assistant at Panthéon-Assas University and then the University Paris I Panthéon-Sorbonne between 1970 and 1984, before becoming a Maître de conférences (equal to an associate professor) in public law from 1984, a position she left when she got elected to the French National Assembly in 1986.

In 1972, she became a technical adviser to Edgar Faure, who was by then the Minister of Social Affairs until 1976; and then she was a technical adviser to then-Secretary of State for Universities Jean-Pierre Soisson. She then became an adviser to then-Minister of Departments and Overseas Territories Bernard Stasi from 1973 to 1974, and then to then-Secretary of State for Tourism Gérard Ducray in 1974. She then became the Chief of Staff to then-Secretary of State and Minister of Universities Alice Saunier-Seité from 1976 to 1978 before working in the private sector as an administrator of CEO of the company Uta-Indemnité between 1979 and 1985. She also practiced as a lawyer during this time.

== Career ==
=== Local politics ===
Alliot-Marie started her electoral career in 1983 as Municipal Councillor for the Basque-area village of Ciboure (in the former province of Labourd and now in the Pyrénées-Atlantiques department), located south of her father's political base of Biarritz, near Saint-Jean-de-Luz; she stayed on until 1988. In 1989, she was elected to another council, this time in Biarritz, alongside her father. In 1990, as part of the municipal majority behind the first Deputy Mayor Didier Borotra of the UDF-CDS, she passed draft legislation in opposition to build a hotel-casino on the front of the main beach of the town, which caused a collapse of the council. Early municipal elections in 1991 were won by Didier Borotra, who united the local UDF, two elected Socialists, and Basque nationalists, who provided additional support. She left the council at the same time that her father was defeated as Mayor. She then served as Mayor of Saint-Jean-de-Luz from 1995 until 2002, and as First Deputy Mayor since then. She was also a member and a Vice President of the General Council of Pyrénées-Atlantiques between 1994 and 2001.

=== National politics ===
Alliot-Marie was elected to the National Assembly to represent Pyrénées-Atlantiques in 1986 as a member of the Gaullist Rally for the Republic (RPR). She has been seating in the Assembly ever since, except when she sat in the government; this is due to the French law on Cumul des mandats (literally: "accumulation of mandates") that prohibit cabinet ministers from simultaneously serving as deputies in the French National Assembly; her alternate as Deputy was Daniel Poulou, who served from 1993 to 1995 and again from 2002 to 2011 when she served as Cabinet Minister.

She served as Secretary of State (junior minister) for Schools under the Minister of National Education in Jacques Chirac's second government from 1986 to 1988 and as Minister of Youth Affairs and Sports in Édouard Balladur's government from 1993 to 1995.

From 1989 to 1993, she was a Member of the European Parliament as a member of the political group European Democratic Alliance.

=== President of the RPR ===
In 1999, "MAM" entered the challenge for the presidency of the RPR against Chirac's candidate and, to most insiders' surprise, won by a landslide, becoming the first woman to lead a major French political party. She remained President of the party until 2002 when it merged with the Union for a Popular Movement (UMP), a merger she opposed at first.

=== Defense ministership ===
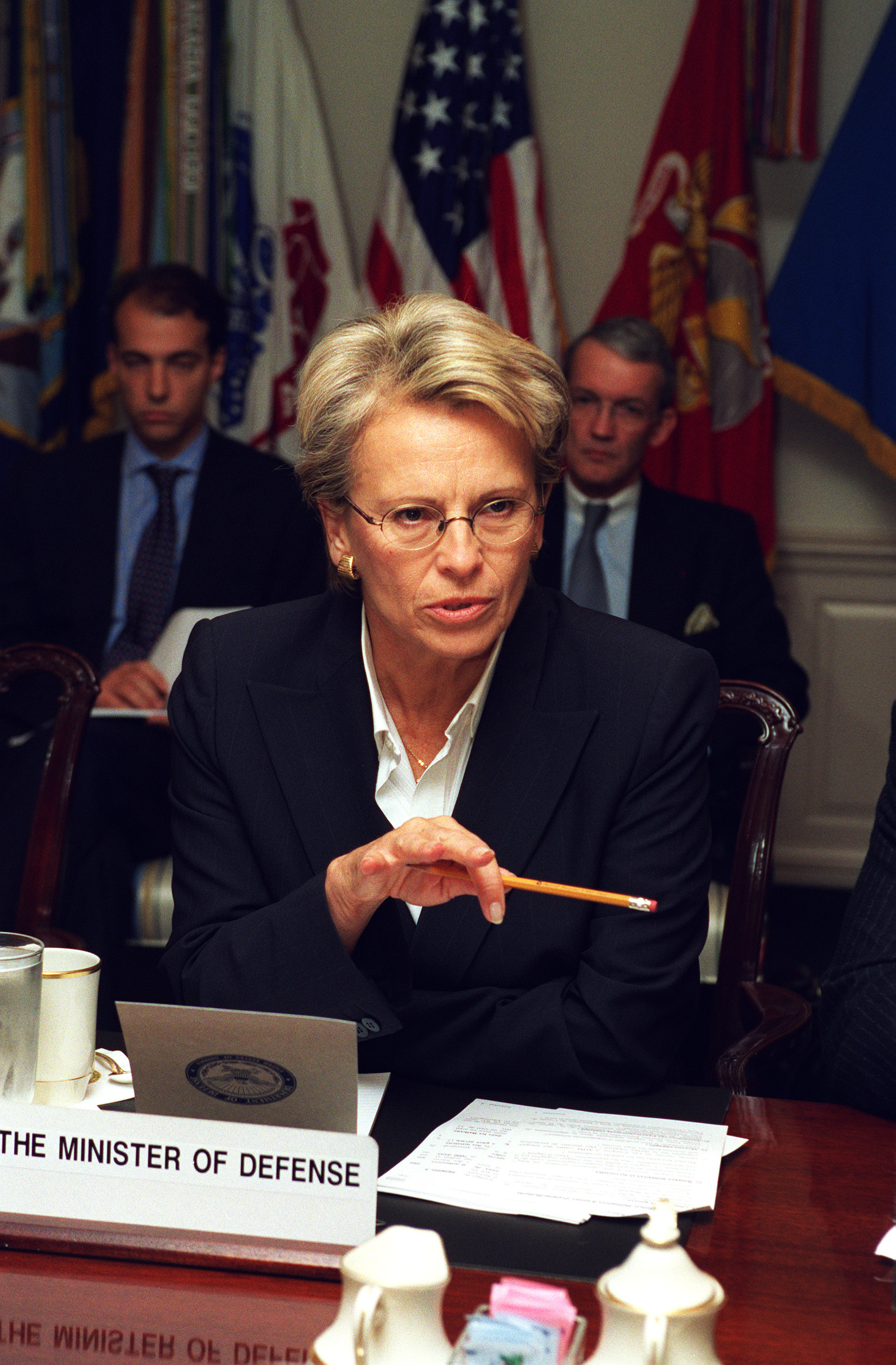
French Minister of Defense Michèle Alliot-Marie meets with US Secretary of Defense Donald H. Rumsfeld in The Pentagon on 17 October 2002. Alliot-Marie and Rumsfeld are meeting to discuss defense issues of mutual interest.

Alliot-Marie was Minister of Defense during Jacques Chirac's second presidential term, France's first woman in this position. Between May and June 2002, she was also in charge of Veterans' Affairs. Forbes magazine declared her the 57th most powerful woman in the world in 2006 and the 11th in 2007. She kept the Defense portfolio in Jean-Pierre Raffarin's three governments and in Dominique de Villepin's government.

She remained a leading Gaullist after the RPR merger into the UMP, and created her own movement within the party, Le Chêne (The Oak). Although she publicly considered competing with Nicolas Sarkozy for the UMP nomination in the 2007 presidential election, she ruled herself out of the running in January 2007 and endorsed Sarkozy. Sarkozy and Alliot-Marie had a history of disagreements in the party's National Council.

=== Interior and Justice ministerships ===
After Sarkozy's election as president, Alliot-Marie was appointed Minister of the Interior, the Overseas and Local Communities in François Fillon's government, being the first woman to hold the position.

Two years later, after the 2009 European Parliament election, she was appointed Minister of Justice and Liberties and Keeper of the Seals and was bestowed the title of Minister of State, which gave her the most senior rank in the government after the Prime Minister. She was made a Vice President of the UMP the same year.

=== Foreign Affairs ministership ===
In November 2010, Alliot-Marie was appointed Minister of Foreign and European Affairs, remaining Minister of State and being again the first female holder of the office.

When civil unrest began in Tunisia in early 2011, Alliot-Marie came under scrutiny for going on vacation there during the events, as she had frequently done in the past. She further caused controversy when she told the National Assembly that French riot police could be offered to help restore order; she was specifically criticised for allegedly sending teargas to Tunisia as late as January 2011. Before leaving office, she proposed sending paratroopers to quell the protests.

Her situation embarrassing the government, she resigned as Foreign Minister on 27 February 2011 after only a few months in office. She was succeeded by outgoing Defense Minister and former Prime Minister Alain Juppé.

In the 2012 French legislative elections, she lost her seat as Deputy (MP) for the 6th constituency of Pyrénées-Atlantiques to Socialist Party candidate Sylviane Alaux in the second round, 48.38% to Alaux's 51.62% share of the vote.

=== Political career ===
Ministerial offices

- Secretary of State for Education: 1986–1988.
- Minister of Youth and Sports: 1993–1995.
- Minister of Defense: 2002–2007.
- Minister of the Interior, Overseas Territories and Territorial Communities : 2007–2009.
- Keeper of the Seals, Minister of State, Minister of Justice and Freedoms: 2009–2010.
- Minister of State, Minister of Foreign and European Affairs: 2010–2011 (resignation).

Electoral mandates

European parliament

- Member of the European Parliament : 1989-1992 (resignation); since 2014. Elected in 1989, 2014.

National Assembly

- Deputy to the National Assembly for Pyrénées-Atlantiques (6th constituency): elected in March 1986 (became minister in March 1986) / 1988–1993 / elected in March 1993 (became minister in 1993) / 1995–2002 (became minister in 2002) / reelected in 2007 (remained a minister) / 2011-2012 (defeated). Elected in 1986, reelected in 1988, 1993, 1995, 1997, 2002, 2007.

General Council

- Vice President of the General Council of Pyrénées-Atlantiques: 1994–2001.
- General Councillor of Pyrénées-Atlantiques: 1994–2001.

Municipal Council

- Mayor of Saint-Jean-de-Luz: 1995-2002 (resignation). Reelected in 2001.
- Deputy Mayor of Saint-Jean-de-Luz : Since 2002. Reelected in 2008.
- Municipal Councillor of Saint-Jean-de-Luz: since 1995, reelected in 2001, 2008.
- Municipal Councillor of Biarritz: 1989–1991.
- Municipal Councillor of Ciboure: 1983–1988.

Party political offices

- President of the Rally for the Republic: 1999–2002 (party dissolved). Elected in 1999.
- Vice President of the Union for a Popular Movement: 2009–2012.
- Vice President of The Republicans National Council: since 2015.

== Controversy ==
In 1972, a guard prevented Alliot-Marie from entering the National Assembly chamber because she was wearing pants; women were not allowed to wear pants to work in white-collar government jobs until the late 1960s and not in the Assembly until some years later.

In early 2009, Alliot-Marie received an anonymous death threat accompanied by a 9mm-calibre bullet.

In 2016, French investigating judge Sabine Kheris requested that a case involving Dominique de Villepin, Michel Barnier and Michèle Alliot-Marie be referred to the Court of Justice of the Republic. These former ministers were suspected of having allowed the exfiltration of the mercenaries responsible for the attack on the Bouaké camp in 2004, killing nine French soldiers. The operation was allegedly intended to justify a response operation against the Laurent Gbagbo government in the context of the 2004 crisis in Ivory Coast.

== Personal life ==
Michèle Marie married anthropologist Michel Alliot in 1971, taking the name Michèle Alliot-Marie. They divorced in 1984.

Since 1988, her life partner has been Patrick Ollier, who briefly served as President of the National Assembly in 2007 and subsequently chaired the Assembly's Economy Committee. In November 2010, he was appointed Minister in charge of Relations with Parliament in the Fillon II government. Both were ministers simultaneously for a few months in 2010–2011, the first time a couple ever sat in a French government. Due to her higher public profile, he has been nicknamed "Patrick Ollier-Marie" or "POM".

== Decorations and distinctions ==
=== Decorations ===
- Commander of the Order of the Star of Anjouan (Comoros)
- Commander of the Order of Ivory Merit (Côte d'Ivoire)
- Officer of the Order of the Republic (Egypt)
- Commander of the Order of the Equatorial Star (Gabon)
- Masterful First Class Fins (Peru)

=== Distinctions ===
- Prix de la révélation politique de l'année (English: "Price for Political Revelation of the Year") 1999 - Trombinoscope - being elected as President of the Rally for the Republic party
- Ministre de l'année (English: "Minister of the Year") 2005 - Trombinoscope

== Biography ==
- Darmon, Michaël (2006). Michèle Alliot-Marie, la grande muette [Michèle Alliot-Marie, the Great Mute] (in French). France: L'Archipel. ISBN 2-84187-831-7.

== Publications ==
- Le salarié actionnaire [Employee Shareholders] (PhD in law thesis) (in French). Panthéon-Assas University. 1973.
- Les Décisions politiques et structures administratives [Policy Decisions and Administrative Structures] (PhD in political science thesis) (in French). Paris I. 1982.
- La Décision politique - Attention ! Une République peut en cacher une autre [Political Decision - Attention! A Republic Can Hide Another] (in French). Paris, France: PUF. 1983. ISBN 2-13-038008-5.
- La Grande Peur des classes moyennes [The Great Fear of the Middle Class] (in French). Paris, France: La table ronde. 1996. ISBN 2-7103-0768-5.
- Les boursiers étrangers en France: errements et potentialités [Foreign Scholars in France and Potential Mistakes] (Report) (in French). Rapport parlementaire au nom de la commission des affaires étrangères (English: 'Parliamentary Report on behalf of the Committee on Foreign Affairs'). 1997.
- La République des irresponsables [Republic of Irresponsibles] (in French). France: Odile Jacob. 1999. ISBN 2-7381-0727-3.
- Le Chêne qu'on relève [The Oak Notes That] (in French). France: Odile Jacob. 2005. ISBN 2-7381-1690-6.
- Une femme au cœur du pouvoir d'état [A Woman at the Heart of State Power] (in French). Paris, France: Plon. 2013. ISBN 978-2-259-21824-5.

Political offices
Preceded by Frédérique Bredin	Minister of Youth Affairs and Sports; 1993–1995	Succeeded by Guy Drut
Preceded by Paul Badiola	Mayor of Saint-Jean-de-Luz; 1995-2002	Succeeded by Pierre (Peyuco) Duhart
Preceded by Alain Richard	Minister of Defence; 2002–2007	Succeeded by Hervé Morin
Preceded by François Baroin	Minister of the Interior; 2007–2009	Succeeded by Brice Hortefeux
Preceded by Rachida Dati	Minister of Justice; 2009–2010	Succeeded by Michel Mercier
Preceded by Bernard Kouchner	Minister of Foreign and European Affairs; 2010–2011	Succeeded by Alain Juppé
Party political offices
Preceded by Nicolas Sarkozy	President of Rally for the Republic; 1999–2002	Succeeded by Serge Lepeltier; Acting
