= Pascal Blanc =

Pascal Blanc may refer to:

- Pascal blanc, a white French wine grape variety
- Pascal Blanc (politician) (born 1959), French politician and engineer
