= Journée de solidarité envers les personnes âgées =

French working holiday

The French Journée de solidarité (or Journée de solidarité envers les personnes âgées / Day of solidarity with the elderly) is a French law from the Code Du Travail. It was established on June 30, 2004 under the government of Jean-Pierre Raffarin. This law states that each year an employee must work seven hours for free for one of his or her employers, and that each year the employer has to pay a specific contribution. The contribution is defined by another law at a rate of 0.3 percent to be paid to the ad hoc Caisse nationale de solidarité pour l'autonomie by the employers (0.3 percent is considered to be the approximate value of this seven hours' work). Its effect is the removal of a day's holiday.

The implementation of this new kind of 'worked holiday' has been complicated, and has led to some controversy over its implications for social rights.

== Initial goal ==
Adopted after the 2003 heatwave caused the death of nearly 15,000 people, the revenue from the law is intended to finance actions in favor of elderly people, especially to prevent risks due to excessive heat. Firms must pay one day's gross salary (without wage costs and social security contributions) for each employee to the State. Estimated figures led to discussion as to the scheme's productivity, which Prime Minister Dominique de Villepin judged satisfactory. On June 1, 2006, he said that benefits from the day (scheme) had been "incalculable".

== Principle ==
The employer pays exactly 0.3 percent of employees' gross salary, which is included in employer wage costs. This amount is almost equivalent to one day of net salary. The employer does not have wage costs to pay for that working holiday (because there is no net salary for that day). Thus it results in the employer paying only half the usual rate for one working day and benefits from that day. Over the course of a year, this day is almost equal to (considering a rate of 50 percent for employer wage costs):

- an increase of 0.44 percent for working hours for the employee, i.e., a decrease of 0.43 percent for hourly wage;
- a decrease of nearly 0.23 percent of hour wage costs for the employer.

The difference between the two rates (0.43 and 0.23), about 0.20 percent of hourly costs including wage costs, is passed to the State.

=== Amounts collected by the state ===
- 2005: €1,950,000,000
- 2006: €2,090,000,000
- 2007: €2,200,000,000

== Implementation and reaction ==
In 2004, this new added working day was imposed by law to be by default on Pentecost Monday, formerly a non-working holiday. From 2004 to 2008, Pentecost Monday was worked by numerous employees. Pentecost Monday is still a holiday (but a working holiday). This was confirmed by the French Council of State on May 3, 2005.

Many people, especially from the Collectif des Amis du Lundi (CAL) activist organisation are against this law which re-establishes in France one mandatory unpaid work day. The French Council of State was consulted over the constitutional position but did not consider the law illegal.

Employer unions' points of view:

- the Mouvement des entreprises de France is in favour of working on this day. In 2006, Laurence Parisot said that working this Monday is "very good". She feels that the government is giving "a bad example" by closing schools and post offices on this day.
- The Confédération générale des petites et moyennes entreprise states that the day "will create inequalities between administrations, big companies on one side, and SME/VSB on the other side. Contrary to the former, the latter will not be able to pay the contribution and offer this day to their employees.

Employee unions' point of view:

- Confédération Française des Travailleurs Chrétiens says that "working without wage is equivalent to mandatory or forced work".
- CFDT: "There will be strikes by salaried workers who refuse to work on this day. And they are right to oppose it," says François Chérèque, because these are "mostly employees of small companies and retailers" who will work, whereas "in many places, big companies and administrations, they have been able to negotiate to keep this holiday a non-working holiday."

== See also ==
- Labour law
- French Vignette (road tax)
