= Claire Borotra =

French actress and producer

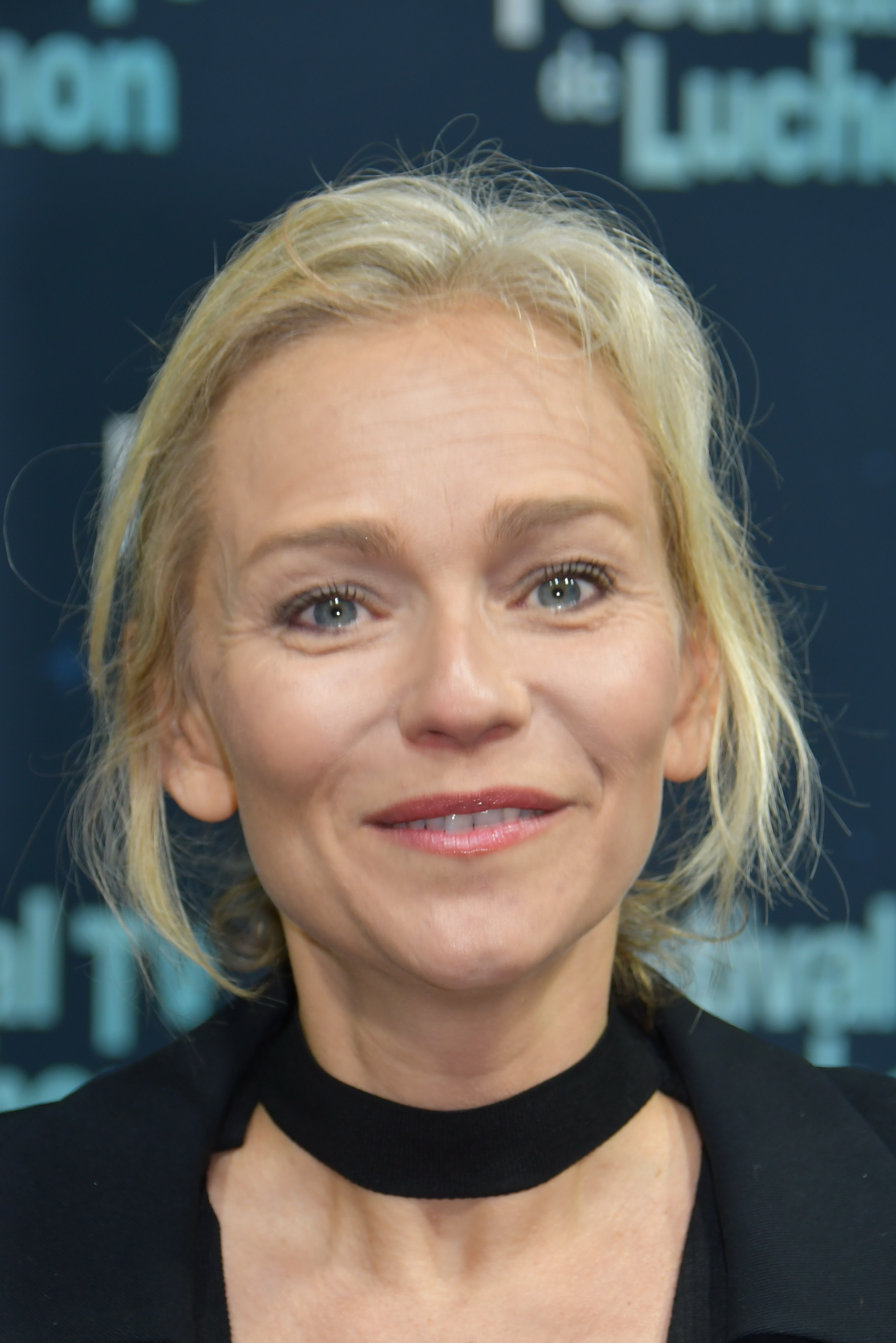
Borotra at the Luchon TV Festival in February 2022

Claire Borotra (born 25 September 1973 in Boulogne-Billancourt, Paris) is a French actress, screenwriter and producer.

She first found fame in the 2003 mini-series Le Bleu de l'océan (The Blue of the Ocean) shown on TF1, where she played the heroine, Talia Vargas.

== Biography ==
Claire Borotra is the daughter of Franck Borotra, the niece of Didier Borotra (French politicians) and the great niece of tennis player Jean Borotra. From the ages of 19 to 12, she studied classical dance at the school of the Paris Opera. She later studied economics at Paris Dauphine University.

She has two children with the actor Jérôme Anger.
