= Bernard Marie =

Mayor of Biarritz
- In office 1977–1991
- Preceded by: Guy Petit
- Succeeded by: Didier Borotra

Personal details
- Born: 18 June 1918 Toulouse, France
- Died: 10 February 2015 (aged 96) Neuilly-sur-Seine, France
- Party: RPR
- Spouse: Renée Leyko
- Children: Michèle Alliot-Marie

Raoul Bernard Lucien Marie (17 June 1918 – 10 February 2015) was a French former international rugby referee, former Deputy in the French National Assembly (1967–1981), and former Mayor of Biarritz (1977–1991). He is also the founder of the organization Fondation du Bénévolat and a grand officer of the Legion of Honour. His daughter is former cabinet minister Michèle Alliot-Marie (born 1946), who served as Defense Minister, Interior Minister, Justice Minister, and Foreign Affairs Minister.

== Biography ==
He was the first French referee to officiate in a Six Nations Championship rugby match. He was elected deputy for the fourth (former) constituency of the Pyrénées-Atlantiques (1967-1981). He later became mayor of Biarritz(1977-1989). He co-founded the Fondation du Bénévolat in 1995, which he chaired on a voluntary basis for more than twelve years.

Il crée ainsi l'assurance gratuite pour les bénévoles en France. Entre le 1er janvier 2008 et le 31 décembre 2014, plus de 700 000 assurances gratuites seront ainsi offertes au bénévoles des associations françaises.

He founded the association for the organization of festivals in 1979 and created numerous festivals such as the Arcachon Latin American Film Festival and the International Festival of Young Directors, which has seen the emergence of new talent.

At the same time, he is developing the financial resources of the Rayon Vert association, which helps people in financial difficulty on the Basque coast.

He is the father of Michèle Alliot-Marie, born in 1946.

He is an officer of the Legion of Honor (an honorary title conferred by Jacques Chirac, then President of the Republic).
