= Sign of the Dove =

Sign in Christianity

The Sign of the Dove is a prominent symbol in Christianity and Judaism.

== Symbolism in Judaism ==
In Judaism, the dove (Hebrew: יוֹנָה, yônāh) appears in both biblical texts and rabbinic literature, where it is associated with peace, purity, and divine favour. In the Hebrew Bible, the most notable appearance occurs in the account of Noah, where a dove returns to the ark after the flood with a freshly plucked olive leaf, signifying the abatement of the floodwaters and God's renewed mercy toward the earth.

According to the Bible, doves, or pigeons, were also used in ancient Israel as a religious sacrifice within the tabernacle and temples.

== Symbolism in Christianity ==
In Christian thought, the dove is commonly understood to be a symbol of the Holy Spirit, most notably associated with the baptism of Jesus. This association is rooted in the canonical Gospel accounts of the baptism, where the spirit is described as descending "like a dove".

The name Jonah, from the Hebrew Yôwnâh (יוֹנָה), means dove. The "sign of Jonas" in the Gospel of Matthew is related to the "sign of the dove".

Augustine of Hippo discussed the dove as a symbol in his writings. In De Trinitate, he stated that the Holy Spirit appeared in the form of a dove at Jesus's baptism not because the Spirit has a physical form, but to provide a visible sign understandable to humans. In his Tractates on the Gospel of John, Augustine noted that the dove's gentleness reflected qualities associated with the Holy Spirit. He also used the dove to represent the unity of the church, writing, "The Holy Spirit, who dwells in the saints... has fused them into one dove, whose wings are covered with silver."

=== In The Church of Jesus Christ of Latter-day Saints ===
In the theology of the Church of Jesus Christ of Latter-day Saints, the sign of the dove is considered a divine witness instituted before the world's creation, and that the devil cannot assume the dove's sign. This symbol is referenced multiple times in LDS scripture and teachings.

Joseph Smith, the founder of the LDS Church, said the Holy Ghost is a distinct personage and does not literally become a dove.

== See also ==
- Christian symbolism: Dove
- Doves as symbols
- Peace symbols
- Pentecost
