= Serge Lepeltier =

French politician

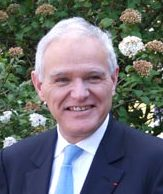
- Serge Lepeltier in 2008

Minister of Ecology and Sustainable Development
- In office 31 March 2004 – 1 June 2005
- President: Jacques Chirac
- Prime Minister: Jean-Pierre Raffarin
- Preceded by: Roselyne Bachelot
- Succeeded by: Nelly Olin

Mayor of Bourges
- In office 1995–2014
- Preceded by: Jean-Claude Sandrier
- Succeeded by: Pascal Blanc

Personal details
- Born: 12 October 1953 (age 72) Le Veurdre, France
- Party: UMP; The Republicans
- Education: HEC Paris

Serge Lepeltier (born 12 October 1953) is a French politician.

He studied at HEC Paris.

He was mayor of Bourges in 1995 and again in 2001. He was elected senator of the Cher département on 27 September 1998.

He won the municipal elections in Bourges in 1995 over the communist candidate.

He briefly acted as President of the Rally for the Republic in 2002 after Michèle Alliot-Marie was nominated as Minister of Defence, and just before the Party was officially dissolved within the Union for a Popular Movement.

On 31 March 2004, Jean-Pierre Raffarin's government announced a reshuffle because of the massive losses in the French regional elections. Serge Lepeltier became Minister of the Environment, while Roselyne Bachelot-Narquin was dismissed.

In 2005 Serge Lepeltier joined the Radical Party.

Political offices
Preceded by Michèle Alliot-Marie	Acting President of Rally for the Republic; 2002	Succeeded by None. Party merged within the Union for a Popular Movement
