= Jean-Pierre Raffarin =

Prime Minister of France from 2002 to 2005

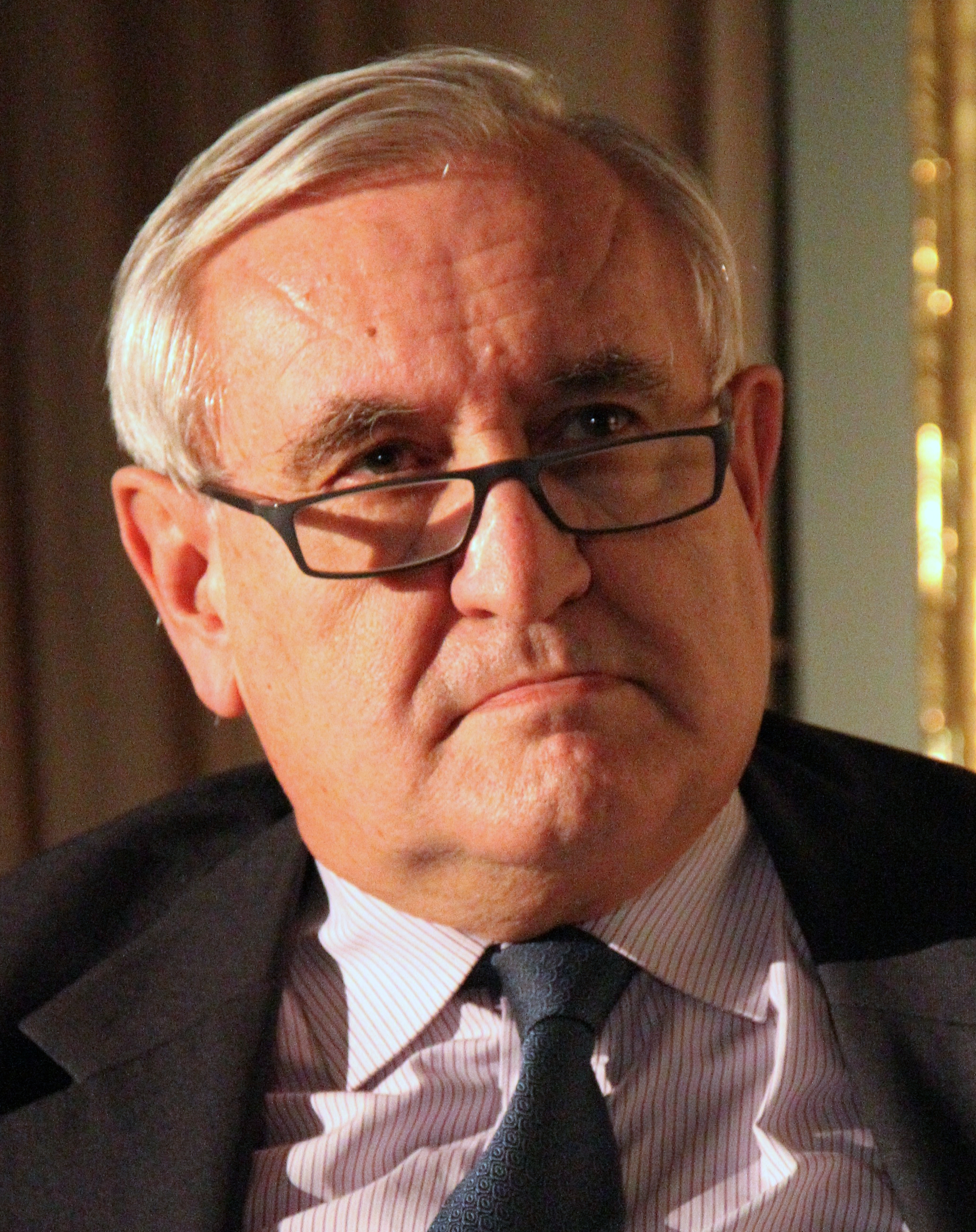
- Raffarin in 2013

Prime Minister of France
- In office 6 May 2002 – 31 May 2005
- President: Jacques Chirac
- Preceded by: Lionel Jospin
- Succeeded by: Dominique de Villepin

Member of the Senate
- In office 18 September 2005 – 4 October 2017
- Constituency: Vienne
- In office 1 October 2004 – 1 November 2004
- Constituency: Vienne
- In office 21 September 1997 – 6 June 2002
- Constituency: Vienne
- In office 2 October 1995 – 31 October 1995
- Constituency: Vienne

Minister of Small and Medium Enterprises, Commerce and Crafts
- In office 18 May 1995 – 4 June 1997
- Prime Minister: Alain Juppé
- Preceded by: Alain Madelin
- Succeeded by: Marylise Lebranchu

Member of the European Parliament
- In office 25 July 1989 – 18 May 1995
- Constituency: France

President of the Regional Council of Poitou-Charentes
- In office 19 December 1988 – 8 May 2002
- Preceded by: Louis Fruchard
- Succeeded by: Élisabeth Morin

Personal details
- Born: 3 August 1948 (age 78) Poitiers, France
- Party: Horizons (2022–present)
- Other political affiliations: Liberal Democracy (before 2002); UMP (2002–2015); The Republicans (2015–2019)
- Spouse: Anne-Marie Perrier (m. 1980)
- Children: 2
- Education: Panthéon-Assas University; ESCP Business School
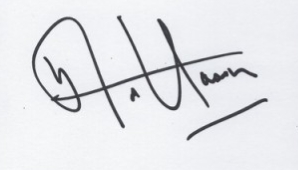
- Signature

Jean-Pierre Raffarin (French: [ʒɑ̃pjɛʁ ʀafaʁɛ̃]; born 3 August 1948) is a French politician who served as Prime Minister of France from 6 May 2002 to 31 May 2005 under President Jacques Chirac.

He resigned after France's rejection of the referendum on the European Union draft constitution. However, after Raffarin resigned, he said that his decision was not based on the outcome of the vote. Opinion polls following his resignation suggested that Raffarin was one of France's least popular prime ministers since the Fifth Republic was established in 1958. However, according to the book France: 1815–2003, written by Martin Evans and Emmanuel Godin, Raffarin was "a remarkably popular Prime Minister" despite his ability "to state the obvious and to make empty statements".

He was also Vice President of the Senate from 2011 to 2014.

== Early life ==
Born 3 August 1948, Raffarin grew up in Poitiers, the son of a prominent national figure: his father Jean Raffarin was vice-minister of Agriculture in the government of Pierre Mendès France (1954–1955). He studied law at Université Paris-Panthéon-Assas and later graduated from the École Supérieure de Commerce de Paris. He started his professional career in marketing.

In the 1970s, his first political commitment was in the association of Valéry Giscard d'Estaing's young supporters. Defining himself as a "giscardien", he joined the staff of Lionel Stoléru, Secretary of state for Manual Workers and Immigration, and the Republican Party, the liberal-conservative component of the centre-right confederation the Union for French Democracy (UDF).

== Political career ==
In the 1980s, he started a career in local politics in Poitou-Charentes region. With the support of René Monory, the local political leader, he took the chair of the regional council in 1988. Seven years later, he was elected senator of Vienne département.

Governmental functions

- Prime Minister : 2002–2005.
- Minister of Small and Medium Enterprises, Commerce and Craft : 1995–1997.

Electoral mandates

European Parliament

- Member of European Parliament : 1989–1995 (Became minister in 1995). Reelected in 1994.

Senate of France

- Senator of Vienne : Elected in 1995, but he stays minister / 1997–2002 (became prime minister in 2002) / Re-elected in 2004, but he stays prime Minister / Since 2005. Elected in 1995, re-elected in 1997, 2004, 2005, 2008.

Regional Council

- President of the Regional Council of Poitou-Charentes : 1988–2002 (Resignation). Re-elected in 1992, 1998.
- Vice-President of the Regional Council of Poitou-Charentes : 2002–2004.
- Regional councillor of Poitou-Charentes : 1986–2004. Reelected in 1992, 1998.

Municipal Council

- Deputy-mayor of Chasseneuil-du-Poitou : 1995–2001.
- Municipal councillor of Chasseneuil-du-Poitou : 1995–2001.
- Municipal councillor of Poitiers : 1977–1995. Re-elected in 1983, 1989.

Political functions

- Vice-President of the Union for a Popular Movement : Since 2007.

=== In Government ===
During the 1995 presidential campaign, while most UDF politicians supported Édouard Balladur, he chose the winning candidacy of Jacques Chirac. In return, he was nominated Minister of Small and Medium-sized Companies, Commerce and Craft Industry in Alain Juppé's cabinet (1995–1997).

At the same time, the pro-Chirac UDF members founded the Popular Party for French Democracy. Then, he returned in the Republican Party, became Liberal Democracy (DL) in 1997. He was vice-president of DL until 2002.

=== Prime minister ===
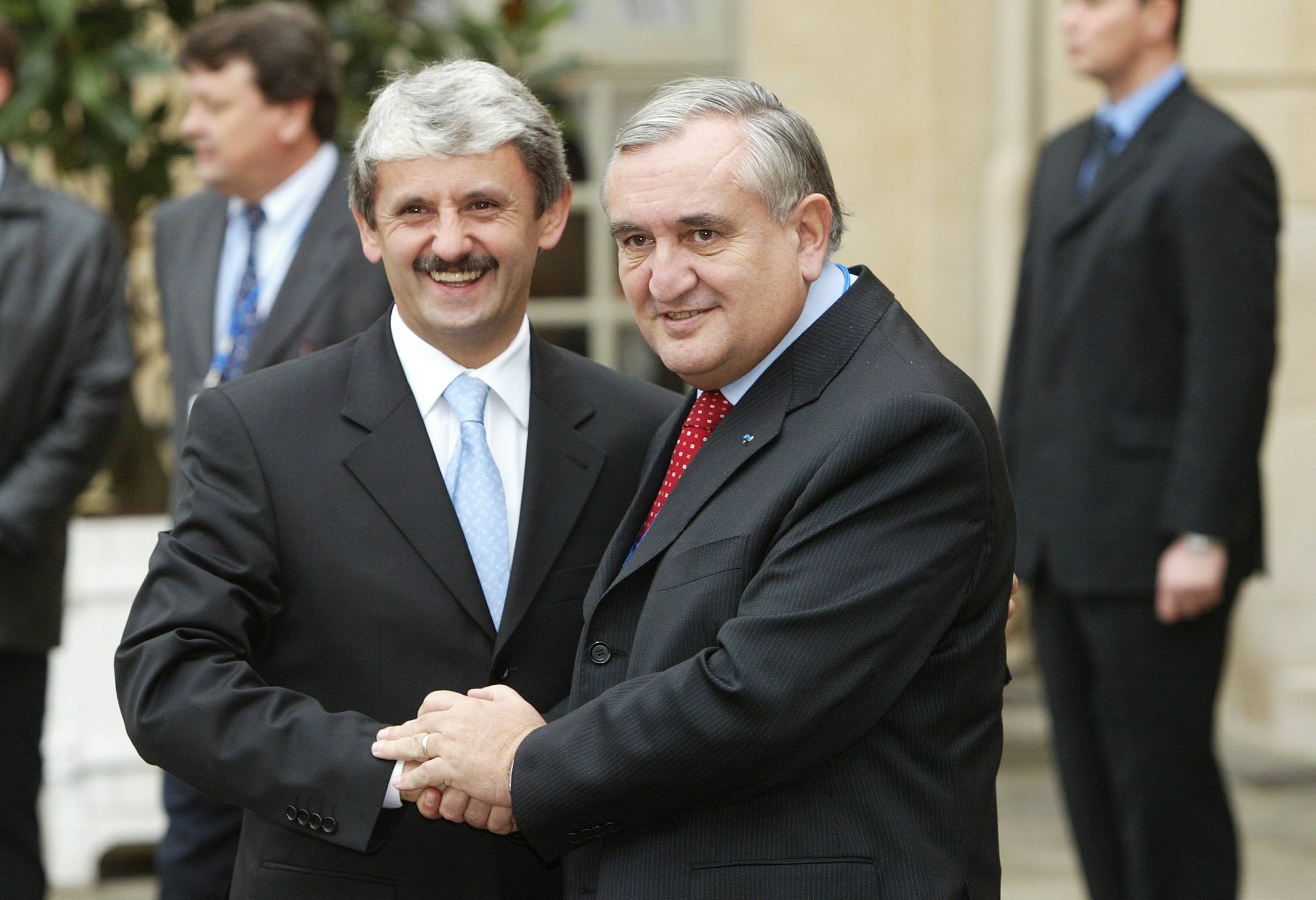
Prime Minister Raffarin and Mikuláš Dzurinda in Paris, December 2003

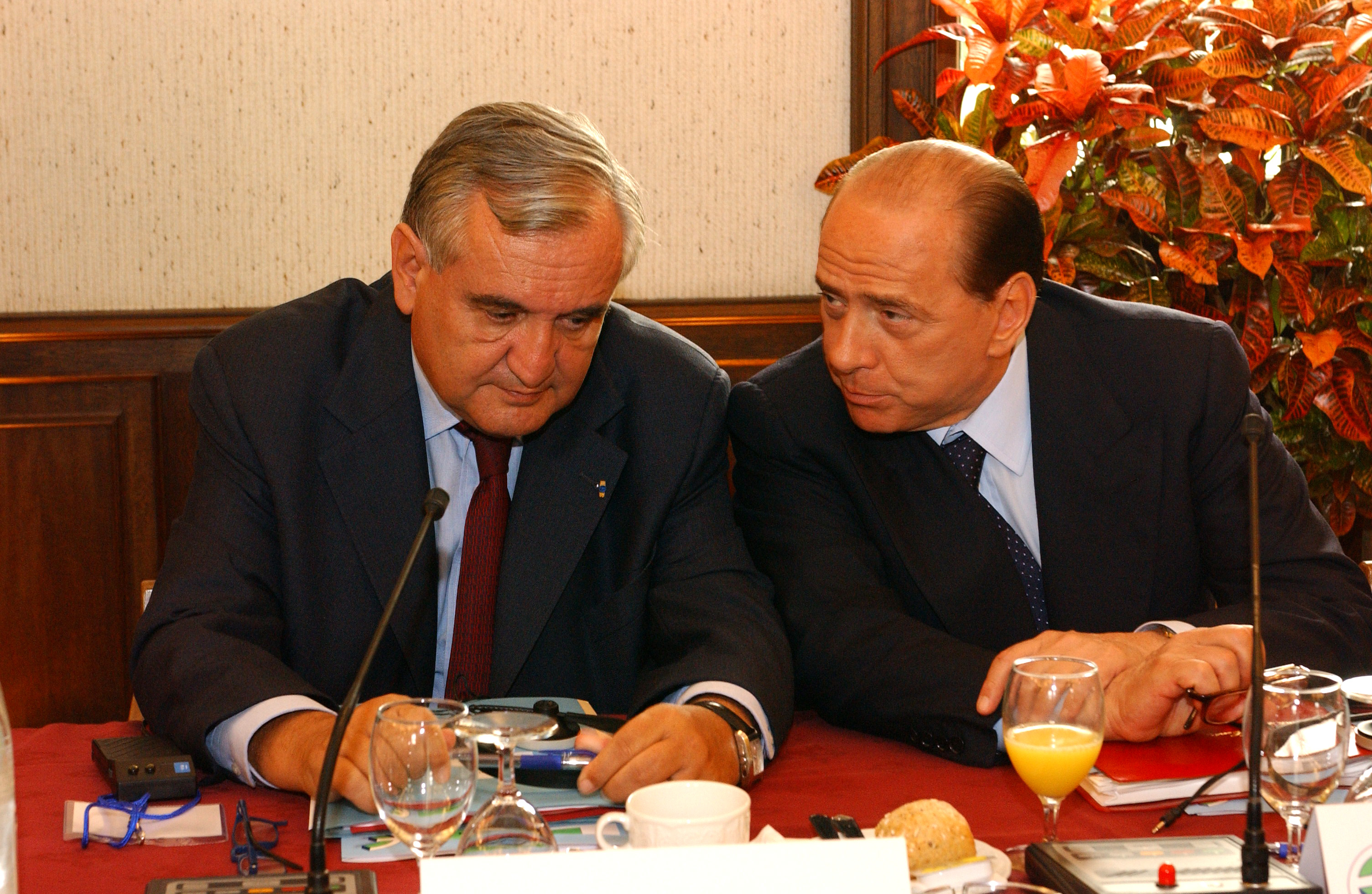
Raffarin with Italian prime minister Silvio Berlusconi, June 2004

During the 2002 presidential campaign, he advocated the union of the right behind the incumbent President Chirac. After his re-election, Chirac wished to give a sign of political renewal. Furthermore, elected in a special second round by a majority of left-wing voters, he searched for a moderate to lead the cabinet and the June 2002 legislative campaign. Raffarin participated in the formation of the Union for a Popular Movement (UMP). He criticized the American-led intervention in Iraq.

His political policies combined authority and moderate economical liberalism – that is, the support of laissez-faire economic policies. In 2003 he launched reforms of the public retirement scheme and of decentralisation, which led to many strikes. During the summer of 2003 the country experienced an unusual heat wave which caused the death of nearly 15,000 people. The perceived late reaction of the government was blamed on his administration. In 2004 he began a reform of the French state-run health-care system.

Raffarin's governments were known for their internal quarrels with various ministers taking opposite positions in public. The alleged lack of authority of the Prime Minister was mocked by the media.

On 28 March 2004 the ruling UMP party suffered an important defeat during the regional elections, with all but one région out of 22 of mainland France going to the opposition (PS, PCF, Les Verts). This was generally interpreted, including by Raffarin himself in his post-election speech, as "a sign of distrust against the government from the electorate". On 30 March 2004 Jean-Pierre Raffarin tendered the resignation of his government to president Jacques Chirac, who immediately re-appointed him prime minister, with the delegation to form a new government. This major cabinet reshuffle removed some of its most controversial ministers like Luc Ferry (education) or Jean-François Mattei (health).

=== Resignation ===
Raffarin's resignation was accepted by President Chirac on 30 May 2005, after the "no" victory at the European Constitution referendum, and he was replaced as prime minister by Dominique de Villepin.

On 18 September 2005, he was elected Senator in the Vienne département. Speculation were that he could eventually try to become President of the Senate or President of the Union for a Popular Movement if Nicolas Sarkozy won the 2007 presidential election. He became one of the Vice presidents of the UMP in 2007. In September 2008, he sought the Senate UMP fraction's investiture to become President of the Senate, but was defeated by Gérard Larcher.

Raffarin is Grand Officer of the Legion of Honour and Grand Cross of National Order of Merit.

=== International policies ===
During a state visit to China on 21 April 2005 he avoided opposing the new "anti-secession" law on Taiwan, stating that "The anti-secession law is completely compatible with the position of France" and "The position of France has always been to 'one China' and we will remain attached to this position". On the embargo on weapons, he stated that "France continues to ask for a lifting of the embargo, and does not see what could lead the European Council to change position on that question". By convention, foreign affairs are one of the President's—and not the Prime Minister's—sole responsibilities.

== Governments ==
=== First ministry (May–June 2002) ===
- Jean-Pierre Raffarin – Prime Minister
- Dominique de Villepin – Minister of Foreign Affairs, Cooperation, and Francophonie
- Michèle Alliot-Marie – Minister of Defense and Veterans
- Nicolas Sarkozy – Minister of the Interior, Interior Security, and Local Liberties
- Francis Mer – Minister of Economy, Finance, and Industry
- François Fillon – Minister of Labour, Social Affairs, and Solidarity
- Dominique Perben – Minister of Justice
- Luc Ferry – Minister of National Education, Youth, Higher Education, and Research
- Jean-Jacques Aillagon – Minister of Culture and Communication
- Hervé Gaymard – Minister of Agriculture, Food, and Rural Affairs
- Roselyne Bachelot – Minister of Ecology and Sustainable Development
- Tokia Saïfi – Minister Delegate of Sustainable Development
- Jean-François Lamour – Minister of Sport
- Brigitte Girardin – Minister of Overseas
- Gilles de Robien – Minister of Transport, Housing, Tourism, Sea, and Equipment
- Jean-François Mattéi – Minister of Health, Family, and Handicapped People
- Jean-Paul Delevoye – Minister of Civil Service, Reform of the State, and Regional Planning
- Renaud Donnedieu de Vabres – Minister of European affairs

=== Second ministry (2002–2004) ===
- Jean-Pierre Raffarin – Prime Minister
- Dominique de Villepin – Minister of Foreign Affairs
- Michèle Alliot-Marie – Minister of Defense
- Nicolas Sarkozy – Minister of the Interior, Interior Security, and Local Liberties
- Francis Mer – Minister of Economy, Finance, and Industry
- François Fillon – Minister of Labour, Social Affairs, and Solidarity
- Dominique Perben – Minister of Justice
- Luc Ferry – Minister of National Education, Youth, Higher Education, and Research
- Jean-Jacques Aillagon – Minister of Culture and Communication
- Hervé Gaymard – Minister of Agriculture, Food, and Rural Affairs
- Roselyne Bachelot – Minister of Ecology and Sustainable Development
- Tokia Saïfi – Minister Delegate of Sustainable Development
- Jean-François Lamour – Minister of Sport
- Brigitte Girardin – Minister of Overseas
- Gilles de Robien – Minister of Transport, Housing, Tourism, Sea, and Equipment
- Jean-François Mattéi – Minister of Health, Family, and Handicapped People
- Jean-Paul Delevoye – Minister of Civil Service, Reform of the State, and Regional Planning
- Noëlle Lenoir – Minister of European affairs

=== Third ministry (2004–2005) ===
- Jean-Pierre Raffarin – Prime Minister
- Michel Barnier – Minister of Foreign Affairs
- Michèle Alliot-Marie – Minister of Defense
- Dominique de Villepin – Minister of the Interior, Interior Security, and Local Liberties
- Nicolas Sarkozy – Minister of Economy, Finance, and Industry
- Jean-Louis Borloo – Minister of Labour, Employment, and Social Cohesion
- Dominique Perben – Minister of Justice
- François Fillon – Minister of National Education, Higher Education, and Research
  - François d'Aubert – Minister delegate of Research
- Renaud Donnedieu de Vabres – Minister of Culture and Communication
- Hervé Gaymard – Minister of Agriculture, Food, Fish, and Rural Affairs
- Serge Lepeltier – Minister of Ecology and Sustainable Development
- Jean-François Lamour – Minister of Youth, Sport, and Community Life
- Brigitte Girardin – Minister of Overseas
- Gilles de Robien – Minister of Transport, Tourism, Regional Planning, Sea, and Equipment
- Philippe Douste-Blazy – Minister of Health and Social Protection
- Marie-Josée Roig – Minister of Family and Childhood
- Renaud Dutreil – Minister of Civil Service and Reform of the State
- Nicole Ameline – Minister of Parity and Professional Equality

=== Minor changes ===
29 November 2004 – following Nicolas Sarkozy's resignation to become president of the UMP:

- Hervé Gaymard – Minister of Economy, Finance, and Industry (replaced Nicolas Sarkozy)
- Dominique Bussereau – Minister of Agriculture, Food, Fish, and Rural Affairs (replaced Hervé Gaymard)

25 February 2005 – following a scandal forcing Gaymard's resignation:

- Thierry Breton – Minister of Economy, Finance, and Industry

== Raffarinades ==
Jean-Pierre Raffarin was often teased for his optimistic aphorisms, known colloquially and ironically as raffarinades, the best known being La route est droite, mais la pente est forte ("The road is straight, but the slope is steep"). Some consider that the word raffarinade was created in reference to the other French word mazarinade. However, mazarinade refers to the songs that the frondeurs (French revolutionaries during the Régence of Queen Anne – Archduchess of Austria – and chief minister Cardinal de Mazarin, before king Louis XIV's personal reign) sang to mock the unpopular chief minister.

Raffarin also tried his English prior to the referendum on the European draft Constitution but this turned out to be an ill-advised idea, as shown in this famous excerpt from his speech: "Win the yes needs the no to win against the no." The referendum itself was eventually nicknamed le Raffarindum by its opponents while Journée de solidarité envers les personnes âgées (Day of solidarity with the elderly) is sometimes referred to as la Saint-Raffarin by discontented workers (following a decision by Raffarin, French workers are supposed to work on Whit Monday for free, but public transportation still uses its "Sundays and holidays" timetable).

== Honours ==
French honours

- Grand Cross of the Légion d'honneur (2022 ; Grand Officier in 2008).
- Grand Cross of the Ordre national du Mérite (2002).
- Gold Medal of the Society for the Encouragement of Progress (2019).

Foreign honours

- Collar of the Order of Friendship (China, 2019).
- Grand Cordon of the Order of Ouissam Alaouite (Morocco, 2003).
- Grand Cross of the Order of Christ (Portugal, 2006).
- Officier of the National Order of Quebec (Quebec, 2003).
- Grand Cross of the Order of the Star of Romania (Romania, 2004).

== See also ==
- List of prime ministers of France
- Politics of France

Political offices
Preceded by Alain Madelin	Minister of Commerce; 1995–1997	Succeeded by Marylise Lebranchu
Preceded by Lionel Jospin	Prime Minister of France; 2002–2005	Succeeded by Dominique de Villepin
Order of precedence
Preceded by Alain Juppé as Former Prime Minister	Order of precedence of France; Former Prime Minister	Succeeded by Dominique de Villepin as Former Prime Minister
