= Le Bleu de l'océan =

French television series

Le Bleu de l'océan ([lə blø də lɔsɛɑ̃]) (The blue of the ocean) was a 2003 French television mini-series. In five episodes of 100 minutes and directed by Didier Albert, it was originally broadcast on TF1 from 2 July 2003 onwards and then repeated on Gulli in 2011.

== Plot ==
Before dying, Talia's adoptive mother tells her that her birth mother was Ariane Delcourt, who was part of one of the most prominent families in Saint-Jean-de-Luz before her disappearance. Talia thus decides to look into the mysterious past but when she approaches the Delcourts she faces their pettiness, especially in her birth sister Mathilde, who nurses the worst intentions.

== Cast ==
- Claire Borotra : Talia Vargas
- Alexandra Vandernoot : Mathilde Mallet, née Delcourt
- Bernard Verley : Charles Delcourt
- Philippe Caroit : Clément Mallet
- Bruno Madinier : Paul Delcourt
- Mireille Darc : Patricia Delcourt
- Natacha Amal : Jeanne
- Jean-Michel Tinivelli : Marc Esteban
- Louise Monot : Julie Delcourt
- Anthony Dupray : Olivier Mallet-Delcourt
- Églantine Rembauville : Esther Mallet-Delcourt
- Jean-Marie Juan : Lieutenant Morel
- Philippe du Janerand : Etcheverry
- Yves Afonso : Henri Bonnat
- Jean-Pascal Lacoste : José Feirrera
- Christian Abart : Maurice Hillau
- Camille Lafont-Rapnouil : Mathilde as a child
