= Daniel Poulou =

French politician

Daniel Poulou (born 28 July 1943 in Biarritz) was a member of the National Assembly of France. He represented Pyrénées-Atlantiques's 6th constituency, as a member of the Union for a Popular Movement.
