= Franck Borotra =

French politician

President of the departmental council of Yvelines
- In office 1995–2005
- Preceded by: Paul-Louis Tenaillon
- Succeeded by: Pierre Bédier

Member of the National Assembly from Yvelines' 2nd Constituency
- In office 2 April 1986 – 18 June 2002
- Succeeded by: Valérie Pécresse

Minister of Posts, Telegraphs, and Telephones
- In office 7 November 1995 – 2 June 1997
- President: Jacques Chirac
- Prime Minister: Alain Juppé
- Preceded by: François Fillon

Deputy mayor of Versailles
- In office 1988–1995

Personal details
- Born: 30 August 1937 (age 89) Nantes, France
- Party: Rally for the Republic party (RPR)
- Relations: Didier Borotra (twin brother)
- Children: Claire Borotra
- Education: French Institute of Petroleum

Franck Borotra (born 30 August 1937) is a French politician, member of the Rally for the Republic party. He was the Minister of Posts, Telegraphs, and Telephones from 7 November 1995 to 2 June 1997 under the government of Prime Minister Alain Juppé and was a member of the National Assembly from 1986 to 2002. He also served as President of the Departmental Council of Yvelines and Deputy Mayor of the city of Versailles. Despite his long career in local and national politics, Borotra is little known among the French public.

== Early life and family ==
Borotra was born on 30 August 1937 in Nantes, in the Loire-Atlantique department on the west coast of France. He trained as an engineer. Before entering politics, he worked in an oil refinery in Dunkirk. In a 2013 public appearance, he said that it was a visit by the former French President Charles de Gaulle to the refinery that motivated him to join politics.

He is the twin brother of Didier Borotra, (Democratic Movement - MoDem), former French senator and mayor of Biarritz. His is also the father of the French actress Claire Borotra and the nephew of the French tennis player and politician Jean Borotra.

== Political career ==
- Municipal council member:
  - 1983 to 1995: Deputy mayor of Versailles, in charge of external co-operation and sports
- Departmental council member:
  - 1988 to 2005: Departmental council member of Vélizy-Villacoublay;
  - 1994 to 2005: President of the departmental council of Yvelines;
- Member of the National Assembly:
  - 2 April 1986 to 14 May 1988;
  - 13 June 1988 to 1 April 1993;
  - 2 avril 1993 to 4 December 1995: resignation 4 December 1995;
  - 26 February 1996 (special elections) to 26 March 1996: abandoned duties to assume ministerial position;
  - 1 June 1997 to 18 June 2002.

== Retirement ==
In February 2002, Borotra announced, in a press release to his supporters, that he would not seek re-election in the 2002 legislative elections. Referring to his career as an engineer and then his engagement in politics, Borotra said in the press release, "I've already had two lives and I will have a third." In 2005, he gave up his last elected mandate as president of the departmental council of Yvelines. He has largely withdrawn from the public eye since leaving politics, only rarely appearing for public events.
