= Pascal Blanc (politician) =

French politician

Mayor of Bourges
- Incumbent
- Assumed office 2014
- Preceded by: Serge Lepeltier

Personal details
- Born: 3 October 1959 (age 65)
- Political party: Union of Democrats and Independents
- Spouse: Laurence
- Children: 2
- Occupation: Politician; Engineer

Pascal Blanc (3 October 1959) is a French politician and engineer.

He is member of the Union of Democrats and Independents party, and served as mayors of Bourges since 2014. In those years, military service still existed and Pascal Blanc carried out his military service as a Volunteer Trainer in Computer Science in 1983-1984. He entered the eni of Saint Etienne, and after 4 years of studies, he got his engineering diploma from this National School of Engineers of Saint-Etienne in the Mechanical Engineering option, was in 1983.

== Biography ==
Pascal Blanc was born in France on 1959. He married Laurence and they had two children Elise and Maxime. Henearning a Baccalaureate series E (Mathematics and Technology) in 1978, which, at that time was an excellent technical career which most often mixed in preparatory classes, then engineering schools.

Political offices
Preceded by Serge Lepeltier	Mayor of Bourges; 2014	Succeeded by -
