= Didier Borotra =

French politician (1937–2024)

Member of the Senate for Pyrénées-Atlantiques
- In office 27 September 1992 – 30 September 2011

Mayor of Biarritz
- In office 1991–2014
- Preceded by: Bernard Marie
- Succeeded by: Michel Veunac

Personal details
- Born: 30 August 1937 Nantes, France
- Died: 21 August 2024 (aged 86) Bayonne, France
- Party: MoDem
- Relatives: Franck Borotra (twin brother); Claire Borotra (niece)
- Education: Sciences Po

Didier Borotra (30 August 1937 – 21 August 2024) was a French politician who was a member of the Senate, representing the Pyrénées-Atlantiques department from 1992 to 2011. He was re-elected in 2001 and did not stand in 2011.

Borotra served alongside Auguste Cazalet (1983–2011), Louis Althapé (1992–2001), André Labbarère (2001–2006) and Annie Jarraud-Vergnolle (2006–2011).

He was a member of the Centrist Union group and the MoDem. At the end of his tenure, he served on the Senate Committee for Foreign Affairs, Defence and the Armed Forces.

In 2017, he was accused of having "wrongfully canceled more than 4,632 minutes" between January 2009 and June 2013, having caused a shortfall of around 120,000 euros to the city of Biarritz. He was sentenced on appeal to a fine of 30,000 euro. His appeal was rejected by the Court of Cassation in 2018.

Borotra died in Bayonne on 21 August 2024, at the age of 86.

== Biography ==
Didier Borotra is the son of Édouard Borotra, the nephew of Jean Borotra, the twin brother of Franck Borotra, and the uncle of Claire Borotra.

After serving as mayor of Arbonne, he was elected mayor of Biarritz in 1991; he was re-elected in 1995, 2001, and 2008. Elected regional councilor in 1986 until 1991, he gave up his seat due to multiple mandates.

Didier Borotra was elected senator for the Pyrénées-Atlantiques region on September 27, 1992, and re-elected on September 23, 2001. In the Senate, he is a member of the Foreign Affairs, Defense, and Armed Forces Committee and president of the National Association of Mayors of Classified Resorts and Tourist Towns. He did not seek re-election in 2011.

In 2017, accused of having “abusively canceled more than 4,632 parking tickets” between January 2009 and June 2013, causing a loss of revenue of approximately €120,000 to the city of Biarritz, he was sentenced on appeal to a fine of €30,000. His appeal was rejected by the Court of Cassation (France) in 2018.

Didier Borotra died in Bayonne on August 21, 2024, at the age of 86.
