= Solidary Republic =

Solidary Republic République solidaire
- Founder-President: Dominique de Villepin
- Secretary-General: Marc Bernier
- Spokesperson: Brigitte Girardin
- Founded: 18 June 2010
- Dissolved: 2012 (became inactive)
- Headquarters: 14 place Henri Bergson; 75008 Paris
- Ideology: Neo-Gaullism; Liberal conservatism Social liberalism Republicanism
- Political position: Centre-right

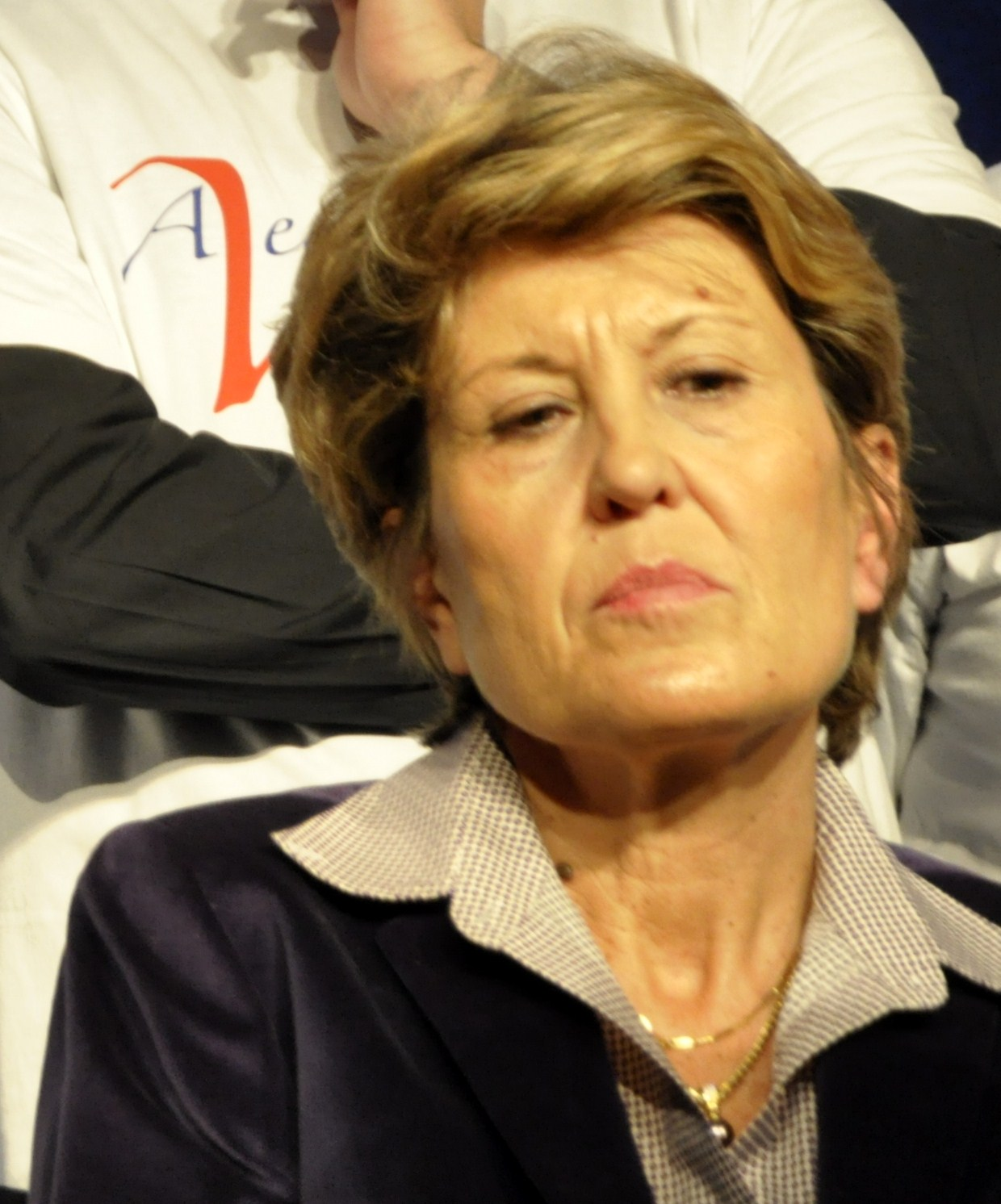
Brigitte Girardin

Solidary Republic (République solidaire, RS) was centre-right political party in France launched by Dominique de Villepin, a former Prime Minister, on 18 June 2010.

The party was set up as the vehicle through which Villepin hoped to contest the 2012 presidential election in competition with his rival Nicolas Sarkozy. Both Villepin and Sarkozy hailed from the Union for a Popular Movement (UMP).

The party was joined, among others, by three former ministers (Brigitte Girardin, Azouz Begag, François Goulard), nine deputies (Marie-Anne Montchamp, Marc Bernier, Daniel Garrigue, Guy Geoffroy, François Goulard, Jean-Pierre Grand, Jacques Le Guen, Michel Raison, Jean Ueberschlag, Jean-Luc Warsmann) and one senator (Pierre Jarlier). Most of its parliamentarians were members of the UMP and its parliamentary group, blurring the difference between RS and UMP.

In November 2010 Marie-Anne Montchamp, the party's spokesperson, was appointed by Sarkozy to serve in François Fillon's third government in a move that was meant to undermine RS. The party did not agree with Montchamp's choice and dismissed her as party spokesperson. In 2011, Daniel Garrigue and Jean-Luc Warsmann left RS.

Villepin announced his bid for the French presidency in December 2011, but his candidacy in 2012 was unsuccessful because he failed to secure the necessary endorsements from elected officials. Almost all of its deputies subsequently retired or lost reelection in the 2012 legislative elections, only Guy Geoffroy (Seine-et-Marne) was returned. The party still exists but appears dormant.

== Leadership ==
- President: Dominique de Villepin (2010–present)
- Interim President: Jean-Pierre Grand
- Secretary-General: Brigitte Girardin (2010–2011), Marc Bernier (2011–present)
- Spokesperson: Marie-Anne Montchamp (2010), Daniel Garrigue (2010–2011), Brigitte Girardin (2011–present)
- Social Media: Jean-Manuel Araujo (2011-)
- Event Organization: Romain Sigier
- Press Relations: Chantal Bockel
- Audiovisual Advisor: Jérémie Carboni (2010)
- Project Commission: Xavier Sauzade

== Elected officials ==
- Deputies: Guy Geoffroy (Seine-et-Marne)
- Senators: Pierre Jarlier (Cantal)
