= Mayenne's 2nd constituency =

Constituency of the National Assembly of France

2nd constituency of Mayenne
- inline Constituency of the National Assembly of France

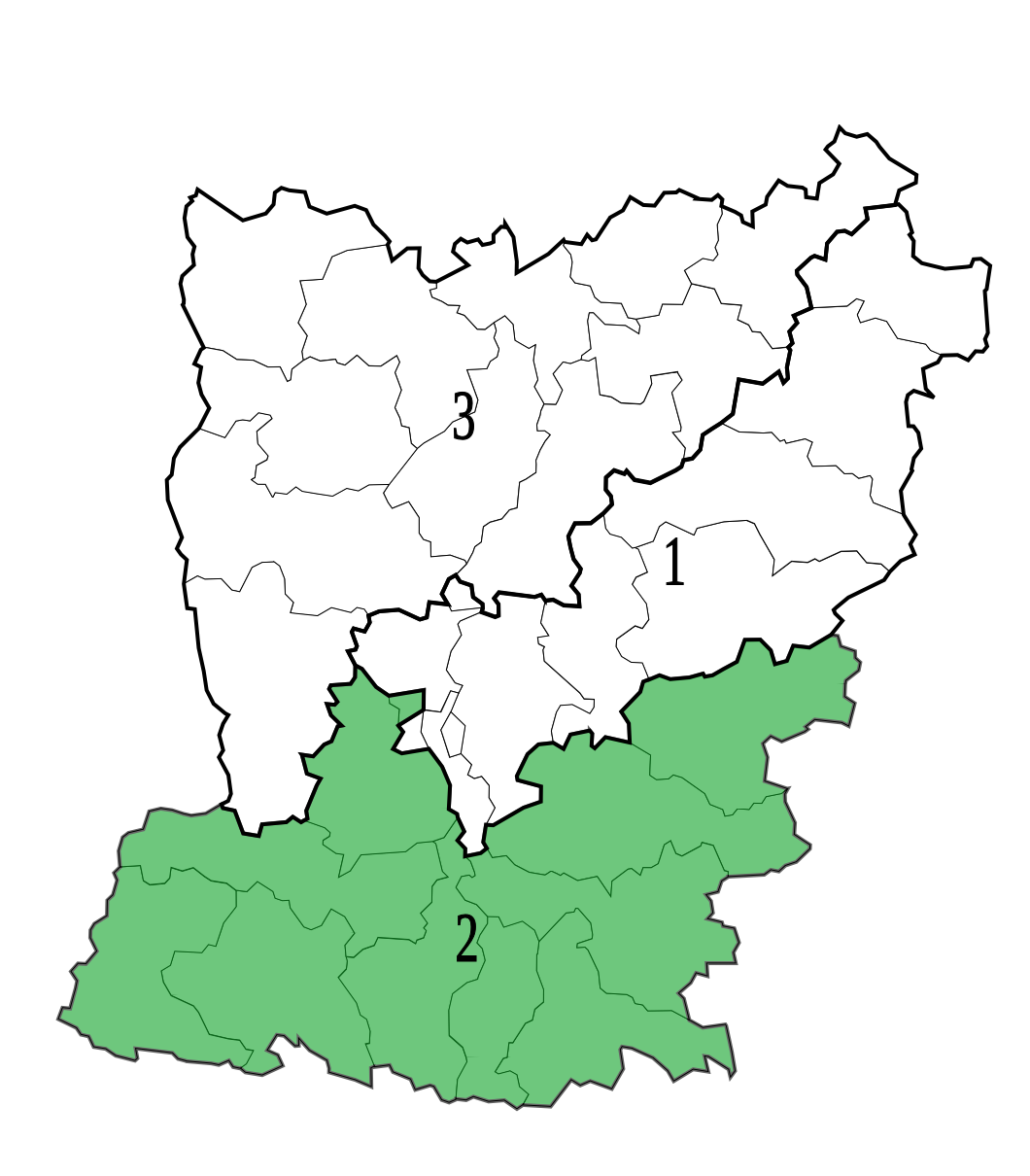
- Map of constituency (as defined in 2010) in department

- Location of Mayenne in France
- Deputy: Géraldine Bannier; MoDem
- Department: Mayenne
- Cantons: (pre-2015) Bierné, Château-Gontier Est, Château-Gontier Ouest, Cossé-le-Vivien, Craon, Grez-en-Bouère, Loiron, Meslay-du-Maine, Saint-Aignan-sur-Roë, Sainte-Suzanne

The 2nd constituency of Mayenne is a French legislative constituency in the Mayenne département.

== Historic representation ==
| Election | Member | Party |
|---|---|---|
| 1988 | Henri de Gastines | RPR |
| 1993 | Henri de Gastines | RPR |
| 1997 | Henri de Gastines | RPR |
| 2002 | Marc Bernier | UMP |
| 2007 | Marc Bernier | UMP |
| 2012 | Guillaume Chevrollier | UMP |
| 2017 | Géraldine Bannier | MoDem |
| 2022 | Géraldine Bannier | MoDem |

== Election results ==
=== 2024 ===
| Candidate | Party | Alliance | First round | | Second round | |
| Candidate | Party | Alliance | Votes | % | Votes | % |
|---|---|---|---|---|---|---|
| Géraldine Bannier | MoDEM | Ensemble | 18,746 | 35.17 | 33,257 | 63.98 |
| Jean-Michel Cadenas | RN | | 16,944 | 31.79 | 18,727 | 36.02 |
| Grégory Boisseau | ECO | Ensemble | 12,135 | 22.77 | | |
| Pierre-Elie Guyon | IND | DVD | 4,877 | 9.15 | | |
| Jean-Luc Placé | LO | | 390 | 0.73 | | |
| Patrice Grudé | DIV | | 209 | 0.39 | | |
| Valid votes | | | 53,301 | 96.95 | 51,984 | 94.86 |
| Blank votes | | | 1,161 | 2.11 | 2,081 | 1.34 |
| Null votes | | | 517 | 0.94 | 734 | 1.34 |
| Turnout | | | 54,979 | 68.93 | 54,799 | 68.67 |
| Abstentions | | | {{formatnum:24 780 | 31.07 | 24,997 | 31.33 |
| Registered voters | | | 79,759 | | 79,796 | |
| Result | | | MoDEM HOLD | | | |

=== 2022 ===
Legislative Election 2022: Mayenne's 2nd constituency
| Party | Candidate | Votes | % | ±% |
|---|---|---|---|---|
| MoDem (Ensemble) | Géraldine Bannier | 10,019 | 27.10 | -11.15 |
| EELV (NUPÉS) | Grégory Boisseau | 8,834 | 23.89 | +3.78 |
| DVC | Christophe Langouët | 7,053 | 19.08 | N/A |
| RN | Jean-Michel Cadenas | 5,966 | 16.14 | +8.43 |
| LR (UDC) | Sophie Dirson | 2,804 | 7.58 | −22.18 |
| REC | Pierre D'Herbais | 1,317 | 3.56 | N/A |
| DLF | Jean Bayle de Jessé | 553 | 1.50 | N/A |
| LO | Jean-Luc Placé | 429 | 2.57 | N/A |
| Turnout | | 38,146 | 48.25 | −3.82 |
2nd round result
| MoDem (Ensemble) | Géraldine Bannier | 19,812 | 58.62 | +3.84 |
| EELV (NUPÉS) | Grégory Boisseau | 13,983 | 41.38 | N/A |
| Turnout | | 36,501 | 46.15 | +0.26 |
| MoDem hold | | | | |

=== 2017 ===
| Candidate | Label | First round | | Second round | |
| Candidate | Label | Votes | % | Votes | % |
|---|---|---|---|---|---|
| Géraldine Bannier | MoDem | 15,077 | 38.25 | 18,013 | 54.78 |
| Guillaume Chevrollier | LR | 11,729 | 29.76 | 14,869 | 45.22 |
| Marie-Noëlle Tribondeau | PS | 3,501 | 8.88 | | |
| Sylviane Dégé | FN | 3,038 | 7.71 | | |
| Françoise Marchand | ECO | 1,789 | 4.54 | | |
| Émeline Rio | FI | 1,541 | 3.91 | | |
| Florian Derouet | PCF | 1,097 | 2.78 | | |
| Françoise Chivert | DLF | 529 | 1.34 | | |
| Joseph Gaudin | DIV | 315 | 0.80 | | |
| Marie de Ponfilly | EXD | 300 | 0.76 | | |
| Maryse Lépron | EXG | 250 | 0.63 | | |
| Martin Bordeau | DIV | 250 | 0.63 | | |
| Votes | | 39,416 | 100.00 | 32,882 | 100.00 |
| Valid votes | | 39,416 | 97.26 | 32,882 | 92.08 |
| Blank votes | | 829 | 2.05 | 2,142 | 6.00 |
| Null votes | | 282 | 0.70 | 687 | 1.92 |
| Turnout | | 40,527 | 52.07 | 35,711 | 45.89 |
| Abstentions | | 37,298 | 47.93 | 42,112 | 54.11 |
| Registered voters | | 77,825 | | 77,823 | |
Source: Ministry of the Interior

=== 2012 ===
Legislative Election 2012: Mayenne's 2nd constituency
| Party | Candidate | Votes | % | ±% |
|---|---|---|---|---|
| PS | Marie-Noëlle Tribondeau | 13,661 | 30.64 | |
| UMP | Guillaume Chevrollier | 9,246 | 20.74 | |
| DVD | Philippe Henry | 7,686 | 17.24 | |
| AC | Elisabeth Doineau | 6,770 | 15.19 | |
| FN | Jocelyne Mallez | 3,637 | 8.16 | |
| EELV | Claude Gourvil | 1,766 | 3.96 | |
| FG | Julie Cochin | 1,046 | 2.35 | |
| Others | N/A | 767 | | |
| Turnout | | 44,579 | 58.10 | |
2nd round result
| UMP | Guillaume Chevrollier | 21,910 | 51.73 | |
| PS | Marie-Noëlle Tribondeau | 20,446 | 48.27 | |
| Turnout | | 42,356 | 55.21 | |
| UMP hold | | | | |

=== 2007 ===
Legislative Election 2007: Mayenne 2nd - 2nd round
| Party | Candidate | Votes | % | ±% |
|---|---|---|---|---|
| UMP | Marc Bernier | 18,051 | 51.80 | |
| MoDem | Elisabeth Doineau | 16,796 | 48.20 | |
| Turnout | | 36,790 | 54.92 | |
| UMP hold | | Swing | | |

== Sources ==
- Official results of French elections from 1998: "Résultats électoraux officiels en France" (in French). Archived from the original on 20 December 2011.
