= Results of the 2024 French legislative election in Mayenne =

Following the first round of the 2024 French legislative election on 30 June 2024, runoff elections in each constituency where no candidate received a vote share greater than 50 percent were scheduled for 7 July. Candidates permitted to stand in the runoff elections needed to either come in first or second place in the first round or achieve more than 12.5 percent of the votes of the entire electorate (as opposed to 12.5 percent of the vote share due to low turnout).

== Mayenne ==
=== 1st constituency ===
Candidate	Party or alliance		First round		Second round	
Candidate	Party or alliance		Votes	%	Votes	%
Guillaume Garot	New Popular Front	Socialist Party	22,483	45.39	31,428	67.56
Paule Veyre de Soras	National Rally		14,161	28.59	15,089	32.44
Vincent Saulnier	Ensemble	Union of Democrats and Independents	9,957	20.10		
Stéphanie Hibon Arthuis	Miscellaneous right	The Republicans	2,467	4.98		
Fabrice Romier	Far-left	Lutte Ouvrière	465	0.94		
Total			49,533	100.00	46,517	100.00
Valid votes			49,533	97.54	46,517	92.72
Invalid votes			391	0.77	864	1.72
Blank votes			859	1.69	2,788	5.56
Total votes			50,783	100.00	50,169	100.00
Registered voters/turnout			74,167	68.47	74,188	67.62

=== 2nd constituency ===
Candidate	Party or alliance		First round		Second round	
Candidate	Party or alliance		Votes	%	Votes	%
Géraldine Bannier	Ensemble	Democratic Movement	18,746	35.17	33,257	63.98
Jean-Michel Cadenas	National Rally		16,944	31.79	18,727	36.02
Grégory Boisseau	New Popular Front	The Ecologists	12,135	22.77		
Pierre-Elie Guyon	Miscellaneous right		4,877	9.15		
Jean-Luc Placé	Far-left	Lutte Ouvrière	390	0.73		
Patrice Grudé	Independent		209	0.39		
Total			53,301	100.00	51,984	100.00
Valid votes			53,301	96.95	51,984	94.86
Invalid votes			517	0.94	734	1.34
Blank votes			1,161	2.11	2,081	3.80
Total votes			54,979	100.00	54,799	100.00
Registered voters/turnout			79,559	69.10	79,796	68.67

=== 3rd constituency ===
Candidate	Party or alliance		First round		Second round	
Candidate	Party or alliance		Votes	%	Votes	%
Yannick Favennec	Ensemble	Horizons	23,294	48.68	31,379	68.90
Annie Bell	National Rally		14,884	31.11	14,161	31.10
Stéphanie Lefoulon	New Popular Front	Socialist Party	9,176	19.18		
Martine Amelin	Far-left	Lutte Ouvrière	494	1.03		
Total			47,848	100.00	45,540	100.00
Valid votes			47,848	97.28	45,540	95.69
Invalid votes			470	0.96	624	1.31
Blank votes			867	1.76	1,428	3.00
Total votes			49,185	100.00	47,592	100.00
Registered voters/turnout			72,655	67.70	72,672	65.49
