= Opinion polling for the 2012 French presidential election =

This page lists public opinion polls conducted for the 2012 French presidential election, which was held on 22 April 2012 with a run-off on 6 May 2012.

Unless otherwise noted, all polls listed below are compliant with the regulations of the national polling commission (Commission nationale des sondages) and utilize the quota method.

== First round ==
Starting on 12 January 2012, Ifop-Fiducial published a "rolling" poll for Paris Match and Europe 1 which is listed in the tables below as "Ifop-Fiducial" without an asterisk, while separate polls not conducted as part of the "rolling" poll are listed with an asterisk (*). Polls conducted specifically for subsample data are listed with two asterisks (**).

The publication of first-round polls was prohibited after midnight on 20 April 2012.

=== Graphical summary ===
The averages in the graphs below were constructed using polls listed below conducted by the eight major French pollsters. The graphs are smoothed 14-day weighted moving averages, using only the most recent poll conducted by any given pollster within that range (each poll weighted based on recency).

Jean-Pierre Chevènement of the Citizen and Republican Movement (MRC) withdrew his candidacy on 1 February 2012 after failing to secure significant support. Christine Boutin of the Christian Democratic Party (PCD) renounced her candidacy on 13 February and announced her support for Nicolas Sarkozy, as did Hervé Morin of the New Centre (NC) on 16 February, followed by Frédéric Nihous for Hunting, Fishing, Nature and Traditions (CPNT) on 22 February. On 15 March, Dominique de Villepin of United Republic (RS) announced that he would not secure enough sponsorships to become a candidate "barring a republican miracle", effectively ending his campaign, and Corinne Lepage of Cap21 was absent from the official list of candidates published on 19 March, having also failed to secure at least 500 sponsorships.

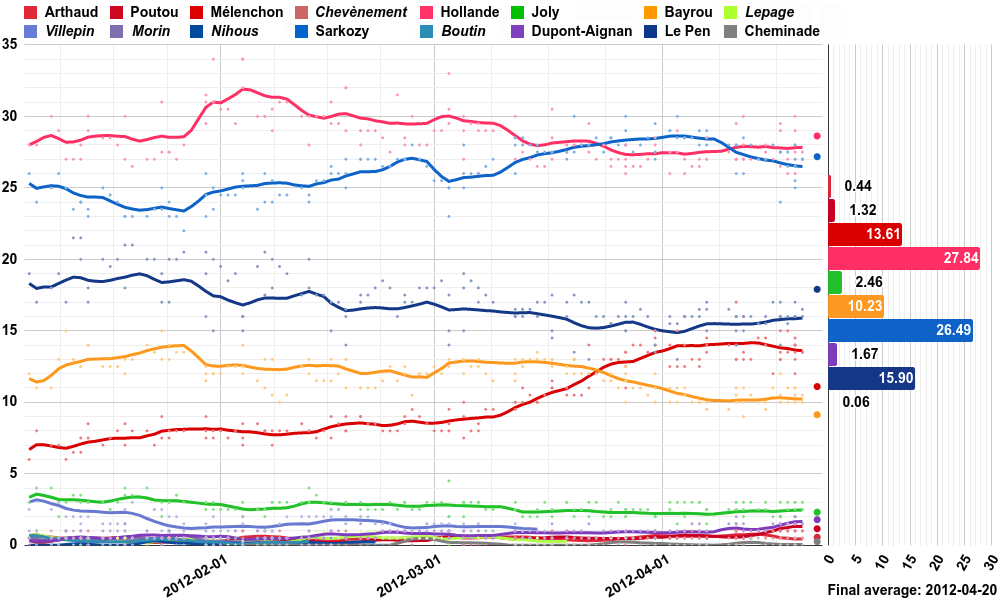

=== Official campaign ===
Polling firm	Fieldwork date	Sample size	Abs.	Arthaud LO	Poutou NPA	Mélenchon FG	Hollande PS	Joly EELV	Bayrou MoDem	Sarkozy UMP	Dupont-Aignan DLR	Le Pen FN	Cheminade S&P
2012 election	22 Apr 2012	–	20.52%	0.56%	1.15%	11.10%	28.63%	2.31%	9.13%	27.18%	1.79%	17.90%	0.25%
Ifop-Fiducial*	18–20 Apr 2012	1,723	25%	0.5%	1%	13.5%	27.5%	2.5%	10%	27%	1.5%	16.5%	<0.5%
Ifop-Fiducial	17–20 Apr 2012	2,592	–	0.5%	1%	13.5%	27%	3%	10.5%	27%	1.5%	16%	<0.5%
BVA	18–19 Apr 2012	2,161	24%	<0.5%	1.5%	14%	30%	2%	10%	26.5%	2%	14%	<0.5%
CSA	18–19 Apr 2012	1,005	–	1%	1.5%	14.5%	28%	2%	10.5%	25%	1.5%	16%	<0.5%
Harris Interactive	18–19 Apr 2012	1,068	–	0.5%	1.5%	12%	27.5%	3%	11%	26.5%	2%	16%	<0.5%
Ipsos	18–19 Apr 2012	1,021	17%	<0.5%	1.5%	14%	29%	2%	10%	25.5%	1.5%	16%	0.5%
TNS Sofres	18–19 Apr 2012	1,000	22%	<0.5%	1%	13%	27%	3%	10%	27%	2%	17%	<0.5%
Ifop-Fiducial	16–19 Apr 2012	2,588	–	0.5%	1%	13.5%	26%	2.5%	11%	28%	1.5%	16%	<0.5%
LH2	17–18 Apr 2012	956	–	1%	1%	15%	27%	2.5%	10%	26.5%	1.5%	15.5%	0%
Ifop-Fiducial	14–18 Apr 2012	2,552	–	0.5%	1%	13.5%	26%	3%	11%	27.5%	1.5%	16%	<0.5%
BVA	16–17 Apr 2012	1,161	–	<0.5%	1%	13%	29.5%	2%	12%	27.5%	1%	14%	<0.5%
CSA	16–17 Apr 2012	886	–	0.5%	1%	15%	29%	2%	10%	24%	1.5%	17%	<0.5%
OpinionWay	16–17 Apr 2012	1,002	26%	0.5%	2%	13%	27.5%	2%	10%	27.5%	1.5%	16%	0%
Ifop-Fiducial	14–17 Apr 2012	1,709	–	0.5%	1%	13.5%	26.5%	3%	10.5%	27.5%	1.5%	16%	<0.5%
Harris Interactive	12–16 Apr 2012	991	–	0.5%	1%	12%	27%	2%	11%	28%	1.5%	17%	<0.5%
Ifop-Fiducial*	12–15 Apr 2012	1,808	–	0.5%	1%	14.5%	28%	3%	9.5%	27%	1%	15.5%	<0.5%
Ifop-Fiducial	12–15 Apr 2012	1,711	–	1%	1%	14%	27.5%	2.5%	10%	27%	1%	16%	<0.5%
Ipsos	13–14 Apr 2012	894	19%	1%	1%	14.5%	27%	2.5%	10%	27%	1%	15.5%	0.5%
Ifop-Fiducial	10–13 Apr 2012	2,562	–	0.5%	0.5%	13%	27%	3%	10.5%	28%	1%	16%	0.5%
BVA	11–12 Apr 2012	885	–	0.5%	0.5%	13%	30%	2%	11%	27%	0.5%	15%	0.5%
TNS Sofres	11–12 Apr 2012	1,000	26%	1%	0.5%	16%	28%	2.5%	9%	26%	1%	16%	<0.5%
Ifop-Fiducial	9–12 Apr 2012	2,562	–	0.5%	<0.5%	13.5%	27%	3%	10%	28.5%	1.5%	16%	<0.5%
CSA	10–11 Apr 2012	1,013	–	0.5%	0.5%	17%	27%	1.5%	11%	26%	1%	15%	0.5%
LH2	10–11 Apr 2012	977	–	1%	1%	13%	29.5%	2.5%	10.5%	27%	1.5%	14%	<0.5%
OpinionWay	10–11 Apr 2012	1,007	–	1%	0.5%	13%	27%	2.5%	10%	28%	2%	16%	0%
Ifop-Fiducial	6–11 Apr 2012	2,285	–	0.5%	<0.5%	14%	27%	3%	10%	28%	1.5%	16%	<0.5%
Ifop-Fiducial	6–10 Apr 2012	1,425	–	0.5%	<0.5%	14%	27.5%	2.5%	9.5%	28%	1.5%	16.5%	<0.5%
Ipsos	6–7 Apr 2012	955	19%	0.5%	0.5%	14.5%	28.5%	1.5%	9.5%	29%	1%	15%	<0.5%
Ifop-Fiducial*	5–7 Apr 2012	1,869	–	0.5%	0.5%	14%	27%	2.5%	9.5%	28.5%	1%	16.5%	<0.5%
Ifop-Fiducial	5–7 Apr 2012	1,002	–	0.5%	0.5%	13.5%	27%	2.5%	10%	28%	1%	17%	<0.5%
Harris Interactive	3–6 Apr 2012	1,033	–	1%	1%	13%	27%	3%	10%	28%	1%	16%	<0.5%
Ifop-Fiducial	3–6 Apr 2012	1,284	–	0.5%	0.5%	12.5%	26.5%	3%	10%	29%	1.5%	16.5%	<0.5%
Ifop-Fiducial	2–5 Apr 2012	1,060	–	0.5%	1%	13%	26.5%	3%	10%	28.5%	1.5%	16%	<0.5%
OpinionWay	3–4 Apr 2012	969	–	0.5%	1%	14%	26%	2%	11%	28.5%	1%	16%	0%
Ifop-Fiducial	31 Mar–4 Apr 2012	1,432	–	0.5%	1%	12.5%	27%	3%	10.5%	28.5%	1%	16%	<0.5%
CSA	2–3 Apr 2012	884	–	0.5%	0.5%	15%	29%	1.5%	10%	30%	0.5%	13%	<0.5%
Ifop-Fiducial	31 Mar–3 Apr 2012	999	–	0.5%	0.5%	12.5%	27.5%	3%	11%	28.5%	1%	15.5%	<0.5%
Harris Interactive	29 Mar–2 Apr 2012	1,059	–	0.5%	0.5%	14%	26%	3%	10%	29%	1%	16%	<0.5%
Ifop-Fiducial	29 Mar–2 Apr 2012	893	–	0.5%	0.5%	12.5%	27.5%	2.5%	11%	29%	1%	15.5%	<0.5%
Ipsos	30–31 Mar 2012	881	20%	1%	0.5%	14.5%	27.5%	2%	10%	29.5%	1%	14%	<0.5%
LH2	30–31 Mar 2012	973	–	0.5%	0.5%	15%	28.5%	2%	12%	27.5%	0.5%	13.5%	0%
BVA	29–31 Mar 2012	2,555	–	1%	1%	14%	28%	2%	11%	27%	1%	15%	<0.5%
Ifop-Fiducial	27–30 Mar 2012	957	–	0.5%	0.5%	13.5%	27%	2.5%	10.5%	28.5%	1%	16%	<0.5%
Ifop-Fiducial	26–29 Mar 2012	950	–	0.5%	<0.5%	14%	26.5%	2.5%	11%	28%	1%	16.5%	<0.5%
Ifop-Fiducial	24–28 Mar 2012	1,211	–	0.5%	0.5%	14%	26.5%	2.5%	11%	27.5%	1%	16%	0.5%
CSA	26–27 Mar 2012	876	–	0.5%	0.5%	12.5%	26%	2.5%	12.5%	30%	0.5%	15%	<0.5%
OpinionWay	26–27 Mar 2012	1,148	–	1%	0.5%	11%	27%	2%	12%	28%	1%	17%	0.5%
TNS Sofres	26–27 Mar 2012	1,000	26%	0.5%	0.5%	13.5%	28%	2%	10%	29%	1%	15%	0.5%
Ifop-Fiducial	24–27 Mar 2012	902	–	<0.5%	0.5%	13.5%	26.5%	2.5%	11.5%	28%	1%	16%	0.5%
Harris Interactive	22–26 Mar 2012	1,231	–	0.5%	0.5%	13%	27%	3%	11%	28%	1%	16%	<0.5%
Ifop-Fiducial*	22–25 Mar 2012	1,769	–	0.5%	0.5%	13%	27%	2%	11.5%	28.5%	1%	15.5%	0.5%
Ifop-Fiducial	22–25 Mar 2012	887	–	0.5%	0.5%	13%	26.5%	2.5%	12%	28.5%	0.5%	15.5%	0.5%
Ipsos	23–24 Mar 2012	978	21%	0.5%	0.5%	13%	28%	2%	11.5%	27.5%	1%	16%	<0.5%
Ifop-Fiducial	20–23 Mar 2012	942	–	0.5%	0.5%	12%	27%	3%	12%	28.5%	0.5%	16%	<0.5%
BVA	21–22 Mar 2012	926	–	<0.5%	<0.5%	14%	29.5%	2%	12%	28%	1.5%	13%	<0.5%
Ifop-Fiducial	19–22 Mar 2012	945	–	0.5%	0.5%	11%	27.5%	3%	12%	28%	0.5%	17%	<0.5%
Ifop-Fiducial	17–21 Mar 2012	1,195	–	0.5%	0.5%	10.5%	28%	2.5%	12%	28%	1%	17%	<0.5%
CSA	19–20 Mar 2012	888	–	<0.5%	<0.5%	13%	28%	2%	13%	30%	0.5%	13.5%	<0.5%
Ifop-Fiducial	17–20 Mar 2012	876	–	0.5%	0.5%	10.5%	28%	2.5%	12%	27.5%	1%	17.5%	<0.5%

=== 17 October 2011 to 19 March 2012 ===
Polling firm	Fieldwork date	Sample size	Abs.	Arthaud LO	Poutou NPA	Mélenchon FG	Chevènement MRC	Hollande PS	Joly EELV	Bayrou MoDem	Lepage Cap21	Villepin RS	Morin NC	Nihous CPNT	Sarkozy UMP	Boutin PCD	Dupont-Aignan DLR	Le Pen FN	Cheminade S&P
Harris Interactive	15–19 Mar 2012	1,097	–	0.5%	1%	11%	–	28%	3%	12%	0.5%	–	–	–	27%	–	1%	16%	<0.5%
Ifop-Fiducial	15–19 Mar 2012	881	–	0.5%	0.5%	10.5%	–	27.5%	3%	12.5%	<0.5%	0.5%	–	–	27.5%	–	0.5%	17%	<0.5%
Ifop	16–17 Mar 2012	961	–	0.5%	0.5%	11%	–	27%	2.5%	13%	–	–	–	–	27.5%	–	0.5%	17.5%	<0.5%
Ipsos	16–17 Mar 2012	950	20%	0.5%	0.5%	11.5%	–	28.5%	2%	13%	<0.5%	–	–	–	27.5%	–	1.5%	15%	<0.5%
LH2	16–17 Mar 2012	962	–	0%	1%	11%	–	30.5%	2.5%	12.5%	–	–	–	–	27.5%	–	0.5%	14.5%	0%
Ifop-Fiducial	13–16 Mar 2012	928	–	0.5%	0.5%	10.5%	–	26.5%	3%	13%	<0.5%	1%	–	–	27.5%	–	0.5%	17%	<0.5%
OpinionWay	14–15 Mar 2012	1,183	–	0.5%	1%	10%	–	27.5%	2%	13%	0.5%	1%	–	–	27.5%	–	1%	16%	–
Ifop-Fiducial	12–15 Mar 2012	928	–	0.5%	0.5%	10%	–	26.5%	2.5%	13.5%	<0.5%	1%	–	–	28%	–	0.5%	17%	<0.5%
Ifop-Fiducial	11–14 Mar 2012	1,187	–	0.5%	0.5%	10.5%	–	27%	2%	13%	0.5%	1%	–	–	28%	–	0.5%	16.5%	<0.5%
CSA	12–13 Mar 2012	861	–	0.5%	<0.5%	11%	–	28%	1%	13%	0.5%	1%	–	–	28%	–	1%	16%	<0.5%
Ifop-Fiducial	11–13 Mar 2012	875	–	0.5%	0.5%	10%	–	27.5%	2%	12.5%	0.5%	1%	–	–	28.5%	–	0.5%	16.5%	<0.5%
TNS Sofres	12 Mar 2012	1,000	28%	0.5%	0.5%	10%	–	30%	3%	11.5%	<0.5%	1.5%	–	–	26%	–	1%	16%	<0.5%
Ifop-Fiducial*	11–12 Mar 2012	1,638	–	0.5%	<0.5%	10%	–	27%	2.5%	13%	0.5%	1%	–	–	28.5%	–	1%	16%	<0.5%
Ifop-Fiducial	8–12 Mar 2012	874	–	0.5%	<0.5%	9.5%	–	28.5%	2.5%	12%	0.5%	1%	–	–	28%	–	1%	16.5%	<0.5%
Ifop-Fiducial	6–9 Mar 2012	922	–	0.5%	0.5%	9.5%	–	29%	2.5%	11.5%	1%	1%	–	–	27%	–	0.5%	17%	–
Ifop-Fiducial	5–8 Mar 2012	924	–	<0.5%	0.5%	9.5%	–	29%	2.5%	12%	1%	1%	–	–	26.5%	–	0.5%	17.5%	–
OpinionWay	5–7 Mar 2012	1,098	–	0.5%	0.5%	8%	–	29%	3%	13%	0.5%	1.5%	–	–	26%	–	1%	17%	–
Ifop-Fiducial	3–7 Mar 2012	1,182	–	<0.5%	<0.5%	8.5%	–	29.5%	3%	12.5%	1%	1%	–	–	26%	–	0.5%	18%	–
Ifop-Fiducial	3–6 Mar 2012	877	–	<0.5%	<0.5%	8%	–	29.5%	3%	12.5%	1%	1%	–	–	26%	–	0.5%	18.5%	–
CSA	5 Mar 2012	888	–	<0.5%	<0.5%	10%	–	30%	2%	13%	0.5%	1.5%	–	–	28%	–	<0.5%	15%	–
Harris Interactive	1–5 Mar 2012	975	–	1%	1%	9%	–	27%	3%	13%	1%	1%	–	–	25%	–	1%	18%	–
Ifop-Fiducial	1–5 Mar 2012	867	–	0.5%	<0.5%	7.5%	–	29%	3%	12%	1%	1%	–	–	26%	–	1%	19%	–
BVA	2–3 Mar 2012	761	–	1%	1%	8%	–	33%	2%	13%	<0.5%	2%	–	–	25%	–	1%	14%	<0.5%
Ipsos	2–3 Mar 2012	966	22%	0.5%	0.5%	9.5%	–	29.5%	2%	12.5%	0.5%	1.5%	–	–	25%	–	1%	17.5%	–
LH2	2–3 Mar 2012	971	–	1%	1%	8.5%	–	30.5%	4.5%	15%	<0.5%	1%	–	–	23%	–	0.5%	15%	–
Ifop-Fiducial	28 Feb–2 Mar 2012	912	–	0.5%	0.5%	8%	–	29%	3%	12%	0.5%	1.5%	–	–	25.5%	–	1%	18.5%	–
Ifop-Fiducial	27 Feb–1 Mar 2012	929	–	0.5%	0.5%	8%	–	29%	3%	12.5%	0.5%	1.5%	–	–	25.5%	–	1%	18%	–
Ifop-Fiducial	24–29 Feb 2012	1,187	–	0.5%	0.5%	8.5%	–	28%	3%	12%	0.5%	1%	–	–	26.5%	–	1.5%	18%	–
Ifop-Fiducial	24–28 Feb 2012	888	–	0.5%	0.5%	9%	–	28%	2.5%	12%	0.5%	1%	–	–	27%	–	1%	18%	–
TNS Sofres	27 Feb 2012	1,000	26%	<0.5%	<0.5%	9.5%	–	30%	2.5%	10.5%	1%	1%	–	–	28%	–	<0.5%	17%	0.5%
Ifop-Fiducial*	23–26 Feb 2012	1,723	–	0.5%	0.5%	8.5%	–	28.5%	3%	12.5%	0.5%	1%	–	–	27%	–	1%	17%	–
Ifop-Fiducial	23–26 Feb 2012	882	–	0.5%	0.5%	9%	–	28%	3%	12%	0.5%	1%	–	–	27%	–	1%	17.5%	–
Ipsos	24–25 Feb 2012	959	25%	0.5%	0.5%	8%	–	31.5%	2.5%	11.5%	0.5%	1%	–	–	27%	–	1%	16%	–
Ifop-Fiducial	21–24 Feb 2012	931	–	0.5%	1%	8%	–	27.5%	3%	12.5%	0.5%	1.5%	–	<0.5%	26.5%	–	1%	18%	–
Ifop-Fiducial	20–23 Feb 2012	931	–	0.5%	1%	8%	–	28.5%	2.5%	11.5%	0.5%	1.5%	–	<0.5%	26.5%	–	1%	18.5%	–
Ifop-Fiducial	18–22 Feb 2012	1,180	–	0.5%	0.5%	8.5%	–	29%	2.5%	11%	1%	1.5%	–	<0.5%	27%	–	0.5%	18%	–
Ifop-Fiducial	18–21 Feb 2012	874	–	0.5%	0.5%	8.5%	–	29%	2.5%	11%	1%	2%	–	<0.5%	27%	–	0.5%	17.5%	–
CSA	20 Feb 2012	891	–	0.5%	<0.5%	9%	–	28%	3%	11%	0.5%	2%	–	0.5%	27%	–	1.5%	17%	–
Ifop-Fiducial	16–20 Feb 2012	872	–	0.5%	<0.5%	9%	–	29%	2.5%	11%	1%	2%	–	<0.5%	27%	–	0.5%	17.5%	–
Ipsos	17–18 Feb 2012	969	23%	0.5%	0.5%	9%	–	32%	3%	11%	1%	1.5%	–	<0.5%	25%	–	0.5%	16%	–
LH2	17–18 Feb 2012	967	–	1%	<0.5%	8%	–	32%	3%	13%	0.5%	1.5%	–	0.5%	26%	–	0.5%	14%	–
OpinionWay	17–18 Feb 2012	975	–	0.5%	0.5%	8%	–	29%	2%	13%	0.5%	2%	–	0.5%	27%	–	0.5%	16.5%	–
Ifop-Fiducial	14–17 Feb 2012	938	–	0.5%	<0.5%	8.5%	–	29.5%	2.5%	12%	0.5%	2.5%	<0.5%	<0.5%	26%	–	1%	17%	–
BVA	15–16 Feb 2012	930	–	<0.5%	<0.5%	9%	–	31%	3%	13%	<0.5%	2%	<0.5%	<0.5%	26%	–	1%	15%	<0.5%
Ifop-Fiducial	13–16 Feb 2012	939	–	1%	<0.5%	7.5%	–	29.5%	2.5%	11.5%	0.5%	2.5%	<0.5%	0.5%	26.5%	–	1%	17%	–
Ifop-Fiducial	11–15 Feb 2012	1,174	–	0.5%	<0.5%	8%	–	30%	3%	11.5%	1%	2%	<0.5%	0.5%	25.5%	<0.5%	0.5%	17.5%	–
Ifop-Fiducial	11–14 Feb 2012	867	–	0.5%	<0.5%	7.5%	–	30%	3.5%	11.5%	1%	2%	<0.5%	0.5%	25.5%	<0.5%	0.5%	17.5%	–
Harris Interactive	9–13 Feb 2012	954	–	<0.5%	<0.5%	8%	–	28%	4%	13%	1%	1%	<0.5%	<0.5%	24%	–	1%	20%	–
Ifop-Fiducial	9–13 Feb 2012	870	–	<0.5%	0.5%	8%	–	30%	3%	12%	0.5%	2%	<0.5%	0.5%	24.5%	0.5%	0.5%	18%	–
Ifop-Fiducial*	9–12 Feb 2012	1,723	–	<0.5%	0.5%	8.5%	–	30%	3%	12.5%	0.5%	2%	<0.5%	<0.5%	25%	<0.5%	0.5%	17.5%	–
Ifop-Fiducial	7–10 Feb 2012	923	–	0.5%	0.5%	8%	–	31%	3%	10.5%	<0.5%	2%	0.5%	<0.5%	24.5%	<0.5%	0.5%	19%	–
Ifop-Fiducial	6–9 Feb 2012	913	–	1%	<0.5%	8%	–	31%	3%	10%	0.5%	1.5%	0.5%	<0.5%	24.5%	<0.5%	0.5%	19.5%	–
OpinionWay	6–8 Feb 2012	1,215	–	0.5%	0.5%	7%	–	29%	3%	13%	0.5%	1%	0.5%	0.5%	25.5%	0.5%	0.5%	18%	–
Ifop-Fiducial	4–8 Feb 2012	1,179	–	1%	<0.5%	8%	–	30.5%	3%	10.5%	0.5%	1%	0.5%	0.5%	24%	<0.5%	0.5%	20%	–
CSA	6–7 Feb 2012	869	–	0.5%	0.5%	8%	–	30%	2%	13%	<0.5%	1%	<0.5%	<0.5%	26%	0.5%	1%	17.5%	–
Ifop-Fiducial	4–7 Feb 2012	871	–	1%	<0.5%	8%	–	30%	2.5%	11%	0.5%	1%	0.5%	0.5%	24%	<0.5%	0.5%	20.5%	–
Ifop-Fiducial	2–6 Feb 2012	876	–	1%	0.5%	8.5%	–	30%	2.5%	11.5%	<0.5%	1%	0.5%	0.5%	23.5%	<0.5%	1%	19.5%	–
BVA	3–4 Feb 2012	779	–	<0.5%	<0.5%	7%	–	34%	2%	14%	<0.5%	1%	<0.5%	<0.5%	26%	<0.5%	<0.5%	16%	<0.5%
Ipsos	3–4 Feb 2012	953	26%	1%	0.5%	8.5%	–	32%	2%	12.5%	<0.5%	2%	<0.5%	<0.5%	25%	<0.5%	<0.5%	16%	–
Ipsos	3–4 Feb 2012	953	26%	3%	1%	10%	–	33.5%	3%	16%	<0.5%	2%	0.5%	<0.5%	28.5%	0.5%	1.5%	–	–
LH2	3–4 Feb 2012	955	–	1%	–	7.5%	–	34%	3%	12%	0.3%	1.5%	0%	–	25.5%	0.2%	–	15%	–
Ifop	31 Jan–3 Feb 2012	922	–	1%	1%	9%	–	33%	3%	17%	–	–	–	–	33%	–	3%	–	–
Ifop-Fiducial	31 Jan–3 Feb 2012	922	–	0.5%	0.5%	8%	–	29.5%	2.5%	12.5%	<0.5%	1%	0.5%	0.5%	24.5%	<0.5%	1%	19%	–
Ifop-Fiducial	30 Jan–2 Feb 2012	917	–	0.5%	0.5%	7.5%	<0.5%	30.5%	2.5%	12.5%	<0.5%	1%	0.5%	0.5%	24.5%	0.5%	0.5%	18.5%	–
Ifop-Fiducial	29 Jan–1 Feb 2012	1,166	–	0.5%	0.5%	8%	0.5%	30.5%	2.5%	12%	<0.5%	1%	<0.5%	<0.5%	24.5%	0.5%	<0.5%	19.5%	–
BVA	30–31 Jan 2012	1,407	–	<0.5%	<0.5%	8%	<0.5%	34%	3%	12%	<0.5%	2%	<0.5%	<0.5%	25%	<0.5%	1%	15%	–
Ifop-Fiducial	29–31 Jan 2012	866	–	0.5%	0.5%	7.5%	0.5%	31%	2.5%	12%	<0.5%	1%	<0.5%	<0.5%	23.5%	0.5%	0.5%	20%	–
TNS Sofres	30 Jan 2012	1,000	26%	<0.5%	<0.5%	9%	<0.5%	31.5%	3%	12%	0.5%	1.5%	<0.5%	<0.5%	26%	<0.5%	0.5%	16%	–
Ifop-Fiducial*	29–30 Jan 2012	1,387	–	0.5%	<0.5%	7.5%	0.5%	31%	3%	11.5%	0.5%	1%	0.5%	<0.5%	24.5%	<0.5%	0.5%	19%	–
Ifop-Fiducial	27–30 Jan 2012	871	–	0.5%	0.5%	8%	0.5%	29.5%	2.5%	12.5%	0.5%	1%	0.5%	<0.5%	23%	<0.5%	0.5%	20.5%	–
Ifop-Fiducial	24–27 Jan 2012	935	–	0.5%	0.5%	8%	0.5%	28%	3%	13.5%	0.5%	1.5%	1%	<0.5%	22%	<0.5%	0.5%	20.5%	–
Ifop-Fiducial	23–26 Jan 2012	926	–	<0.5%	0.5%	8%	0.5%	27%	3.5%	13.5%	0.5%	2%	0.5%	<0.5%	23%	0.5%	0.5%	20%	–
OpinionWay	23–25 Jan 2012	1,087	–	0.5%	0.5%	8%	0.5%	27.5%	3%	14%	1%	1%	1%	–	24%	1%	1%	17%	–
Ifop-Fiducial	21–25 Jan 2012	1,178	–	0.5%	0.5%	7.5%	0.5%	27.5%	3%	13%	0.5%	2%	0.5%	0.5%	23%	0.5%	0.5%	20%	–
CSA	23–24 Jan 2012	898	–	<0.5%	<0.5%	9%	<0.5%	31%	2%	15%	<0.5%	1%	<0.5%	–	25%	<0.5%	<0.5%	17%	–
Ifop-Fiducial	21–24 Jan 2012	864	–	0.5%	0.5%	7.5%	0.5%	27.5%	3%	13%	0.5%	2.5%	0.5%	0.5%	23.5%	0.5%	0.5%	19%	–
Ifop-Fiducial	20–23 Jan 2012	877	–	0.5%	0.5%	7%	0.5%	27%	2.5%	13.5%	0.5%	2.5%	0.5%	0.5%	23.5%	0.5%	0.5%	20%	–
Harris Interactive	19–22 Jan 2012	1,029	–	0.5%	<0.5%	8%	<0.5%	27%	4%	14%	<0.5%	1%	0.5%	0.5%	23%	0.5%	1%	20%	–
Ifop-Fiducial	17–20 Jan 2012	937	–	0.5%	0.5%	8%	0.5%	26.5%	3.5%	13%	<0.5%	3%	0.5%	<0.5%	23%	<0.5%	<0.5%	21%	–
BVA	18–19 Jan 2012	959	–	0.5%	<0.5%	7%	<0.5%	30%	4%	13%	<0.5%	1.5%	1%	<0.5%	23%	0.5%	1.5%	18%	–
Ifop-Fiducial	16–19 Jan 2012	923	–	0.5%	0.5%	8.5%	<0.5%	27%	3.5%	12%	0.5%	2.5%	1%	<0.5%	23%	<0.5%	<0.5%	21%	–
Ifop-Fiducial	14–18 Jan 2012	1,168	–	0.5%	0.5%	8%	0.5%	28%	3%	12.5%	0.5%	1.5%	1%	<0.5%	24%	<0.5%	<0.5%	20%	–
Ifop-Fiducial	14–17 Jan 2012	864	–	<0.5%	0.5%	7.5%	0.5%	28.5%	2.5%	12.5%	1%	1.5%	1%	<0.5%	24.5%	<0.5%	0.5%	19.5%	–
Ifop-Fiducial	13–16 Jan 2012	872	–	<0.5%	<0.5%	7%	0.5%	28.5%	3%	12.5%	0.5%	1.5%	0.5%	<0.5%	25%	<0.5%	1%	20%	–
Ipsos	13–14 Jan 2012	948	23%	1%	<0.5%	7.5%	<0.5%	29%	3%	14%	0.5%	3%	<0.5%	<0.5%	23%	<0.5%	0.5%	18%	–
LH2	13–14 Jan 2012	966	–	0.5%	0%	8.5%	0.5%	30%	3%	14%	0.5%	2%	0%	–	23.5%	0.5%	0%	17%	–
Ifop-Fiducial*	11–13 Jan 2012	1,550	–	0.5%	0.5%	7.5%	0.5%	28%	3%	12.5%	<0.5%	2%	0.5%	<0.5%	24%	<0.5%	1%	20%	–
Ifop-Fiducial	10–13 Jan 2012	942	–	0.5%	0.5%	6.5%	0.5%	27%	3.5%	12.5%	<0.5%	1.5%	0.5%	0.5%	24%	<0.5%	1%	21.5%	–
Ifop-Fiducial	9–12 Jan 2012	943	–	0.5%	0.5%	6.5%	0.5%	27%	3.5%	13%	<0.5%	2%	1%	<0.5%	23.5%	<0.5%	0.5%	21.5%	–
OpinionWay	10–11 Jan 2012	967	–	0.5%	1%	6%	0.5%	27%	3%	15%	0.5%	2%	1%	–	25%	0.5%	1%	17%	–
CSA	9–10 Jan 2012	875	–	<0.5%	0.5%	7%	<0.5%	29%	2%	13%	<0.5%	3%	<0.5%	–	26%	0.5%	<0.5%	19%	–
TNS Sofres **	6–9 Jan 2012	2,007	–	0.5%	<0.5%	7%	1%	30%	4%	11%	0.5%	2.5%	<0.5%	<0.5%	25%	<0.5%	0.5%	18%	–
BVA	6–7 Jan 2012	815	–	1%	<0.5%	8%	1%	28%	4%	11%	1%	4%	<0.5%	<0.5%	24%	1%	<0.5%	17%	–
Ifop	4–6 Jan 2012	1,163	–	0.5%	0.5%	6%	<0.5%	28%	3%	12%	0.5%	2.5%	1%	<0.5%	26%	0.5%	0.5%	19%	–
OpinionWay	16–19 Dec 2011	913	–	0.5%	1%	7.5%	0.5%	27%	4%	14%	0.5%	2%	1%	–	24%	1%	1%	16%	–
Harris Interactive	13–15 Dec 2011	1,031	–	0.5%	<0.5%	6%	1%	28%	4%	11%	0.5%	3%	0.5%	<0.5%	25%	0.5%	1%	19%	–
Ifop	13–15 Dec 2011	937	–	<0.5%	<0.5%	6.5%	0.5%	27.5%	5%	11%	1%	3.5%	0.5%	<0.5%	24%	<0.5%	0.5%	20%	–
OpinionWay	13–15 Dec 2011	912	–	0.5%	1%	6%	0.5%	29%	3%	11%	0.5%	3%	1%	–	25%	1%	1.5%	17%	–
CSA	12–13 Dec 2011	859	–	1%	0.5%	6%	1%	32%	3%	11%	0.5%	2%	<0.5%	–	26%	0.5%	0.5%	16%	–
LH2	9–10 Dec 2011	953	–	<0.5%	<0.5%	6.5%	0.5%	31.5%	4.5%	13%	<0.5%	1%	1%	–	26%	1%	1%	13.5%	–
BVA	2–3 Dec 2011	798	–	<0.5%	<0.5%	7%	1%	35%	3%	9%	1%	1%	<0.5%	<0.5%	24.5%	1%	0.5%	17%	–
Ipsos	2–3 Dec 2011	955	24%	1%	<0.5%	7.5%	0.5%	32%	6%	7%	0.5%	2%	<0.5%	<0.5%	25.5%	<0.5%	0.5%	17%	–
Ifop	29–30 Nov 2011	934	–	<0.5%	<0.5%	7.5%	0.5%	29.5%	4%	8.5%	0.5%	1.5%	1%	<0.5%	26%	0.5%	1%	19.5%	–
TNS Sofres	25–26 Nov 2011	1,003	30%	0.5%	0.5%	8%	0.5%	31%	5%	7%	0.5%	1%	0.5%	–	28%	<0.5%	1%	16.5%	–
OpinionWay	23–24 Nov 2011	952	–	1%	1%	7%	1%	30%	5%	7%	–	1%	1%	–	26%	1%	1%	18%	–
BVA	18–19 Nov 2011	784	–	<0.5%	<0.5%	5%	3%	32%	4%	7%	–	2%	1%	<0.5%	27%	<0.5%	1%	18%	–
LH2	18–19 Nov 2011	830	–	0.5%	0%	7%	1.5%	30%	6%	7%	0.5%	2%	0.5%	–	29%	0.5%	0.5%	15%	–
Ifop	14–16 Nov 2011	1,146	–	0.5%	0.5%	7%	<0.5%	32.5%	4%	6%	0.5%	1.5%	0.5%	0.5%	26%	0.5%	1%	19%	–
CSA	14–15 Nov 2011	822	–	1%	0.5%	5%	1%	34%	4%	7%	0.5%	1.5%	1%	–	27%	0.5%	1%	16%	–
BVA	4–5 Nov 2011	796	–	<0.5%	<0.5%	5%	1%	36%	5%	6%	–	3%	<0.5%	<0.5%	25%	0.5%	0.5%	18%	–
Ifop	2–4 Nov 2011	1,843	–	<0.5%	0.5%	6%	<0.5%	32.5%	4.5%	7%	1%	2%	1%	<0.5%	25.5%	<0.5%	1%	19%	–
Ipsos	28–29 Oct 2011	970	25%	1%	1%	6%	–	35%	6%	5.5%	–	2%	–	–	24%	–	0.5%	19%	–
LH2	21–22 Oct 2011	813	–	0.5%	0%	6.5%	–	39%	5%	8.5%	0%	1.5%	0.5%	–	24%	0%	0.5%	14%	–
Ifop	18–20 Oct 2011	941	–	0.5%	0.5%	6%	<0.5%	35%	4.5%	6.5%	0.5%	2%	1%	0.5%	25%	0.5%	0.5%	17%	–
BVA	17–18 Oct 2011	753	–	2%	<0.5%	6%	–	39%	4%	7%	–	–	–	–	23%	–	–	19%	–
CSA	17 Oct 2011	859	–	1%	0.5%	5%	–	35%	3%	9%	0.5%	2%	1%	–	25%	1.5%	0.5%	16%	–

=== 8 July to 16 October 2011 ===
Polling firm	Fieldwork date	Sample size	Abs.	Arthaud LO	Poutou NPA	Mélenchon FG	Chevènement MRC	Hollande PS	Aubry PS	Royal PS	Strauss-Kahn PS	Joly EELV	Bayrou MoDem	Villepin RS	Borloo PR	Nihous CPNT	Sarkozy UMP	Fillon UMP	Juppé UMP	Boutin PCD	Dupont-Aignan DLR	Le Pen FN
Ipsos	30 Sep–1 Oct 2011	962	27%	1%	0.5%	8%	–	32%	–	–	–	5%	5.5%	4%	6.5%	–	21%	–	–	–	0.5%	16%
Ipsos	30 Sep–1 Oct 2011	962	27%	2%	0.5%	7%	–	–	29%	–	–	5%	6%	5%	7%	–	22%	–	–	–	0.5%	16%
Ipsos	30 Sep–1 Oct 2011	962	27%	1.5%	0.5%	9%	–	–	–	22%	–	7%	8.5%	4%	8%	–	23%	–	–	–	0.5%	16%
LH2	30 Sep–1 Oct 2011	843	–	0.5%	0%	8%	–	31%	–	–	–	7%	8%	2%	7%	–	21%	–	–	0.5%	0%	15%
LH2	30 Sep–1 Oct 2011	843	–	1%	0%	10%	–	–	25%	–	–	7.5%	9%	3%	9%	–	21%	–	–	0%	0%	14.5%
LH2	30 Sep–1 Oct 2011	843	–	0.5%	0%	8.5%	–	30%	–	–	–	7.5%	7.5%	3%	11%	–	–	15%	–	1%	1%	15%
LH2	30 Sep–1 Oct 2011	843	–	0%	0%	9%	–	30%	–	–	–	8.5%	8%	3%	9%	–	–	–	16%	0%	0.5%	16%
CSA	19–20 Sep 2011	835	–	1.5%	0.5%	6%	–	28%	–	–	–	4%	7%	5%	5%	–	24%	–	–	0.5%	0.5%	18%
CSA	19–20 Sep 2011	835	–	0.5%	0.5%	6%	–	–	27%	–	–	5%	6%	5%	5%	–	25%	–	–	0.5%	0.5%	19%
CSA	19–20 Sep 2011	835	–	1%	0.5%	8%	–	–	–	19%	–	6%	7%	5%	6%	–	26%	–	–	1%	0.5%	20%
Harris Interactive	31 Aug–5 Sep 2011	888	–	1%	<1%	3%	–	28.5%	–	–	–	8%	7%	3%	7%	–	23.5%	–	–	–	1%	18%
Harris Interactive	31 Aug–5 Sep 2011	888	–	1%	<1%	5%	–	–	24%	–	–	7%	8%	3%	7%	–	24%	–	–	–	1%	20%
Harris Interactive	31 Aug–5 Sep 2011	888	–	<1%	1%	7%	–	–	–	15%	–	10%	9%	4%	9%	–	24%	–	–	–	1%	20%
Ipsos	2–3 Sep 2011	963	31%	2%	0.5%	5%	–	30%	–	–	–	5%	6%	4.5%	7%	–	22%	–	–	–	1%	17%
Ipsos	2–3 Sep 2011	963	31%	2.5%	0.5%	5.5%	–	–	27%	–	–	6%	6%	3.5%	7%	–	23%	–	–	–	1%	18%
Ipsos	2–3 Sep 2011	963	31%	2%	0.5%	8.5%	–	–	–	19%	–	7%	7%	5%	9%	–	23%	–	–	–	1%	18%
LH2	2–3 Sep 2011	818	–	0.5%	0%	4%	–	35%	–	–	–	6%	6%	2%	6%	–	27%	–	–	2%	0.5%	11%
LH2	2–3 Sep 2011	818	–	0.5%	0%	5%	–	–	30%	–	–	4.5%	6%	3.5%	8.5%	–	27%	–	–	2%	1%	12%
LH2	2–3 Sep 2011	818	–	1%	0.5%	5%	–	–	–	18%	–	10%	8%	4%	10%	–	29%	–	–	2%	0.5%	12%
Ifop	30 Aug–2 Sep 2011	1,918	–	<0.5%	0.5%	6%	0.5%	29%	–	–	–	6%	6%	2.5%	6%	0.5%	23.5%	–	–	0.5%	0.5%	18.5%
Ifop	30 Aug–2 Sep 2011	1,918	–	<0.5%	0.5%	6%	1%	–	25%	–	–	6%	6.5%	3%	6.5%	1%	24%	–	–	0.5%	0.5%	19.5%
Ifop	30 Aug–2 Sep 2011	1,918	–	<0.5%	0.5%	7%	1.5%	–	–	17%	–	9%	8%	3%	8%	1%	25%	–	–	0.5%	0.5%	19%
CSA	22–23 Aug 2011	863	–	1%	0.5%	6.5%	–	27%	–	–	–	5%	7%	3%	8%	–	26%	–	–	0.5%	0.5%	15%
CSA	22–23 Aug 2011	863	–	0.5%	0.5%	7%	–	–	26%	–	–	5%	7%	4%	8%	–	26%	–	–	0.5%	0.5%	15%
CSA	22–23 Aug 2011	863	–	1%	1%	9%	–	–	–	19%	–	7%	9%	4%	8%	–	26%	–	–	0.5%	0.5%	15%
Ifop	19–21 Jul 2011	948	–	<0.5%	<0.5%	4%	0.5%	28%	–	–	–	7%	6.5%	2.5%	7.5%	<0.5%	23%	–	–	0.5%	0.5%	20%
Ifop	19–21 Jul 2011	948	–	0.5%	0.5%	4%	1%	–	25%	–	–	7%	7.5%	2%	8%	<0.5%	23.5%	–	–	0.5%	0.5%	20%
Ifop	19–21 Jul 2011	948	–	0.5%	0.5%	6%	1%	–	–	16%	–	9.5%	9%	3%	8.5%	<0.5%	25%	–	–	0.5%	<0.5%	20.5%
CSA	11 Jul 2011	850	–	2%	0.5%	7%	–	26%	–	–	–	5%	6%	2%	8%	–	26%	–	–	0.5%	1%	16%
CSA	11 Jul 2011	850	–	1%	0.5%	6.5%	–	–	25%	–	–	5%	6%	2%	9%	–	27%	–	–	1%	1%	16%
CSA	11 Jul 2011	850	–	1%	0.5%	8.5%	–	–	–	17%	–	7%	6%	2%	11%	–	28%	–	–	1%	1%	17%
BVA	8–9 Jul 2011	782	–	1%	<0.5%	4%	–	31%	–	–	–	5%	6%	4%	9%	–	23%	–	–	1%	<0.5%	16%
BVA	8–9 Jul 2011	782	–	1%	1%	5%	–	–	28%	–	–	5%	7%	4%	7%	–	24%	–	–	1%	<0.5%	17%
BVA	8–9 Jul 2011	782	–	1%	<0.5%	7%	–	–	–	–	20%	7%	7%	4%	10%	–	25%	–	–	1%	<0.5%	18%
Ipsos	8–9 Jul 2011	955	31%	2%	1%	5%	–	29%	–	–	–	7.5%	5%	3%	8%	–	22%	–	–	–	0.5%	17%
Ipsos	8–9 Jul 2011	955	31%	2%	1%	4.5%	–	–	29%	–	–	7%	5%	3%	8%	–	22%	–	–	–	0.5%	18%
Ipsos	8–9 Jul 2011	955	31%	3%	1%	7%	–	–	–	17%	–	9%	6%	3.5%	11%	–	24%	–	–	–	0.5%	18%
LH2	8–9 Jul 2011	827	–	1%	0.5%	5%	1%	29%	–	–	–	6%	11%	3%	7.5%	–	21%	–	–	1%	1%	13%
LH2	8–9 Jul 2011	827	–	1.5%	0%	5%	1%	–	26%	–	–	6%	10%	4.5%	8%	–	21.5%	–	–	0.5%	1%	15%
LH2	8–9 Jul 2011	827	–	1.5%	0%	7%	2%	–	–	13.5%	–	10%	13%	4%	10%	–	23%	–	–	0%	1%	15%

=== 13 May to 7 July 2011 ===
Polling firm	Fieldwork date	Sample size	Abs.	Arthaud LO	(nominee) NPA	Martin NPA	Mélenchon FG	Chevènement MRC	Hollande PS	Aubry PS	Royal PS	Delanoë PS	Fabius PS	Hulot SE	Joly EELV	Bayrou MoDem	Villepin RS	Borloo PR	Sarkozy UMP	Dupont-Aignan DLR	Le Pen FN
Ifop	21–23 Jun 2011	937	–	0.5%	0.5%	–	6.5%	1.5%	26.5%	–	–	–	–	6.5%	–	6%	3%	7%	21%	<0.5%	21%
Ifop	21–23 Jun 2011	937	–	0.5%	0.5%	–	7%	1%	26%	–	–	–	–	–	6.5%	6%	3%	7.5%	21%	0.5%	20.5%
CSA	20–21 Jun 2011	825	–	1%	1.5%	–	7%	–	27%	–	–	–	–	7%	–	5%	3%	9%	23%	0.5%	16%
CSA	20–21 Jun 2011	825	–	1%	2%	–	7%	–	–	23%	–	–	–	7.5%	–	7%	3%	10%	23%	0.5%	16%
CSA	20–21 Jun 2011	825	–	1%	2%	–	10%	–	–	–	15%	–	–	9%	–	8%	4%	10.5%	24%	0.5%	16%
CSA	20–21 Jun 2011	825	–	1%	1.5%	–	7%	–	27%	–	–	–	–	–	4%	7%	3%	10%	23%	0.5%	16%
CSA	20–21 Jun 2011	825	–	1%	2%	–	7%	–	–	25.5%	–	–	–	–	4%	6%	4%	11%	23%	0.5%	16%
CSA	20–21 Jun 2011	825	–	1%	2%	–	8.5%	–	–	–	17%	–	–	–	5%	9%	4%	13%	24%	0.5%	16%
Ipsos	18–20 Jun 2011	965	30%	1.5%	0.5%	–	7%	–	32%	–	–	–	–	7.5%	–	5%	3%	7%	19%	0.5%	17%
Ipsos	18–20 Jun 2011	965	30%	1%	0.5%	–	7%	–	–	30%	–	–	–	7%	–	5%	4%	8%	19%	0.5%	18%
Ipsos	18–20 Jun 2011	965	30%	2%	1%	–	9.5%	–	–	–	19%	–	–	8.5%	–	7%	4.5%	11%	19%	0.5%	18%
Ifop	9–10 Jun 2011	923	–	0.5%	0.5%	–	6%	1.5%	26%	–	–	–	–	6%	–	7%	3%	6%	22%	0.5%	21%
Ifop	9–10 Jun 2011	923	–	0.5%	1%	–	6.5%	1%	–	23%	–	–	–	6%	–	8%	3.5%	6.5%	21.5%	0.5%	22%
Harris Interactive	3–5 Jun 2011	1,449	–	0%	–	0%	7%	–	27%	–	–	–	–	6%	–	6%	2%	7%	23%	1%	21%
Harris Interactive	3–5 Jun 2011	1,449	–	0%	–	0%	7%	–	–	25%	–	–	–	6%	–	6%	2%	7%	24%	1%	22%
Harris Interactive	3–5 Jun 2011	1,449	–	0%	–	0%	8%	–	–	–	17%	–	–	7%	–	7%	3%	9%	26%	1%	22%
BVA	20–21 May 2011	960	–	1%	1%	–	6%	–	27%	–	–	–	–	12%	–	4%	5%	6%	21%	<0.5%	17%
BVA	20–21 May 2011	960	–	1%	1%	–	5%	–	–	24%	–	–	–	12%	–	6%	5%	7%	22%	<0.5%	17%
BVA	20–21 May 2011	960	–	2%	1%	–	6%	–	29%	–	–	–	–	13%	–	8%	–	–	22%	–	19%
BVA	20–21 May 2011	960	–	2%	1%	–	6%	–	–	26%	–	–	–	13%	–	10%	–	–	23%	–	19%
TNS Sofres	20–21 May 2011	960	32%	1%	–	<0.5%	3.5%	–	31%	–	–	–	–	8%	–	5.5%	3%	7%	22%	–	19%
TNS Sofres	20–21 May 2011	960	32%	1%	–	<0.5%	3%	–	28%	–	–	–	–	–	7%	5.5%	3.5%	8%	24%	–	20%
TNS Sofres	20–21 May 2011	960	32%	1%	–	<0.5%	4%	–	–	28%	–	–	–	9%	–	5%	3%	7%	24%	–	19%
TNS Sofres	20–21 May 2011	960	32%	1%	–	<0.5%	7%	–	–	–	18%	–	–	10.5%	–	7%	3.5%	9%	24%	–	20%
TNS Sofres	20–21 May 2011	960	32%	1%	–	<0.5%	5.5%	–	–	–	–	17.5%	–	12%	–	6%	3.5%	9.5%	24.5%	–	20.5%
TNS Sofres	20–21 May 2011	960	32%	1%	–	0.5%	6%	–	–	–	–	–	15%	11%	–	8%	4%	9.5%	24.5%	–	20.5%
Ifop	17–19 May 2011	1,897	–	0.5%	1%	–	6%	1%	26%	–	–	–	–	6%	–	5%	3.5%	6.5%	22.5%	1%	21%
Ipsos	18 May 2011	1,014	27%	2%	0.5%	–	4%	–	29%	–	–	–	–	11%	–	5%	3%	9%	19%	0.5%	17%
Ipsos	18 May 2011	1,014	27%	1%	0.5%	–	4%	–	–	27%	–	–	–	11%	–	5%	4%	9%	21%	0.5%	17%
Ipsos	18 May 2011	1,014	27%	2%	0.5%	–	6%	–	–	–	16%	–	–	13%	–	7%	6%	12%	19%	0.5%	18%
CSA	16 May 2011	838	–	1%	2%	–	5%	–	23%	–	–	–	–	6%	–	7%	4%	8%	22%	2%	20%
CSA	16 May 2011	838	–	1%	2%	–	5%	–	–	23%	–	–	–	6%	–	7%	4%	8%	23%	2%	19%
CSA	16 May 2011	838	–	1%	2%	–	5%	–	–	–	18%	–	–	6%	–	9%	4%	10%	23%	2%	20%
Ipsos	13–14 May 2011	948	–	2%	1%	–	6%	–	26%	–	–	–	–	11%	–	5%	4%	8%	19%	1%	17%
Ipsos	13–14 May 2011	948	–	2%	1%	–	5%	–	–	25%	–	–	–	9%	–	6%	5%	9%	19%	1%	18%
Ipsos	13–14 May 2011	948	–	2%	1%	–	8%	–	–	–	16%	–	–	12%	–	7%	6%	11%	19%	1%	17%

=== 28 February to 12 May 2011 ===
Polling firm	Fieldwork date	Sample size	Arthaud LO	Besancenot NPA	(nominee) NPA	Mélenchon FG	Chevènement MRC	Strauss-Kahn PS	Aubry PS	Hollande PS	Royal PS	Hulot SE	Joly EELV	Bayrou MoDem	Villepin RS	Morin NC	Borloo PR/UMP	Sarkozy UMP	Dupont-Aignan DLR	Le Pen FN
Ifop	10–12 May 2011	933	0.5%	–	1%	5.5%	1%	26%	–	–	–	7%	–	5.5%	4%	–	5.5%	21.5%	0.5%	22%
Ifop	10–12 May 2011	933	0.5%	–	1%	5%	1.5%	–	–	23%	–	7.5%	–	6%	3.5%	–	6.5%	22%	0.5%	23%
Ifop	10–12 May 2011	933	0.5%	–	1%	5.5%	1%	28%	–	–	–	6%	–	7%	–	–	6.5%	22%	–	22.5%
LH2	6–7 May 2011	575	1%	–	1%	4%	3%	23%	–	–	–	11%	–	8%	6%	–	9%	16%	1%	17%
LH2	6–7 May 2011	565	0.5%	–	1%	4%	2%	–	22%	–	–	11%	–	7%	4.5%	–	11%	19%	1%	17%
LH2	6–7 May 2011	575	0.5%	–	1%	4%	2%	–	–	21.5%	–	11%	–	7%	5%	–	10%	19%	1%	18%
LH2	6–7 May 2011	560	0.5%	–	1%	6%	2%	–	–	–	15%	13.5%	–	8%	5%	–	11%	20%	1%	17%
LH2	6–7 May 2011	561	1%	–	0.5%	5%	1%	24%	–	–	–	–	9%	8%	5.5%	–	9%	18%	1%	18%
CSA	26 Apr 2011	831	1%	4%	–	5%	–	26%	–	–	–	9%	–	5%	4%	–	4%	21%	1%	20%
CSA	26 Apr 2011	831	1%	4%	–	5%	–	27%	–	–	–	9%	–	7%	5%	–	–	22%	1%	19%
CSA	26 Apr 2011	831	1%	4%	–	5%	–	27%	–	–	–	8%	–	6%	–	–	8%	21%	1%	19%
CSA	26 Apr 2011	831	1%	5%	–	5%	–	28%	–	–	–	9%	–	8%	–	–	–	23%	2%	19%
Ifop	20–21 Apr 2011	917	0.5%	4%	–	5%	–	27%	–	–	–	7%	–	5%	4%	–	7.5%	20%	1%	19%
Ifop	20–21 Apr 2011	917	0.5%	4%	–	4.5%	–	–	20%	–	–	8.5%	–	6.5%	4%	–	9.5%	21.5%	1%	20%
Ifop	20–21 Apr 2011	917	1%	4.5%	–	4.5%	–	–	–	21%	–	8%	–	6%	4.5%	–	8.5%	21%	1%	20%
Ifop	20–21 Apr 2011	917	0.5%	4%	–	6%	–	–	–	–	16%	9%	–	6.5%	5%	–	11%	21%	1%	20%
Ifop	20–21 Apr 2011	917	1%	5%	–	5.5%	–	30%	–	–	–	8.5%	–	7%	–	–	–	22.5%	–	20.5%
Ifop	20–21 Apr 2011	917	0.5%	5%	–	5%	–	25%	–	–	–	–	5.5%	6%	4%	–	8%	21%	1%	19%
Harris Interactive	19–20 Apr 2011	926	1%	4%	–	4%	–	30%	–	–	–	6%	–	4%	3%	–	7%	19%	1%	21%
Harris Interactive	19–20 Apr 2011	926	1%	5%	–	5%	–	–	21%	–	–	5%	–	5%	5%	–	9%	20%	1%	23%
Harris Interactive	19–20 Apr 2011	926	1%	5%	–	5%	–	–	–	22%	–	6%	–	5%	5%	–	8%	19%	1%	23%
Harris Interactive	19–20 Apr 2011	926	1%	5%	–	6%	–	–	–	–	15%	8%	–	7%	6%	–	10%	19%	1%	22%
OpinionWay	6–7 Apr 2011	991	0.8%	2.9%	–	4.2%	1.9%	–	21.7%	–	–	–	7.4%	8.5%	3.7%	–	7.8%	19.1%	1.4%	20.6%
CSA	28–29 Mar 2011	841	1%	9%	–	4%	–	33%	–	–	–	–	3%	7%	4.5%	2%	–	18%	0.5%	18%
CSA	28–29 Mar 2011	841	0.5%	9%	–	3%	–	–	26%	–	–	–	3%	8%	7%	2%	–	22%	0.5%	19%
CSA	28–29 Mar 2011	841	0.5%	11%	–	3.5%	–	–	–	24%	–	–	4%	6%	7%	2%	–	22%	1%	19%
CSA	28–29 Mar 2011	841	0.5%	9%	–	6%	–	–	–	–	17%	–	5%	10%	7.5%	3%	–	22%	1%	19%
BVA	25–26 Mar 2011	826	1%	7%	–	4%	–	29%	–	–	–	7%	–	4%	6%	5%	–	17%	1%	19%
BVA	25–26 Mar 2011	826	0.5%	6%	–	4%	–	–	24%	–	–	8%	–	5%	7%	6%	–	19%	0.5%	20%
Ipsos	25–26 Mar 2011	965	1%	6%	–	4%	–	34%	–	–	–	–	5%	5%	5%	1%	–	17%	1%	21%
Ipsos	25–26 Mar 2011	965	1%	6%	–	4%	–	–	25%	–	–	–	5%	7%	8%	1%	–	20%	1%	22%
Ipsos	25–26 Mar 2011	965	1%	6%	–	5%	–	–	–	23%	–	–	5%	7%	8%	1%	–	21%	1%	22%
Ipsos	25–26 Mar 2011	965	2%	7%	–	6%	–	–	–	–	17%	–	7%	8%	9%	1%	–	20%	1%	22%
Ipsos	14 Mar 2011	948	2%	6%	–	5%	–	33%	–	–	–	–	5%	5%	5%	1%	–	18%	1%	19%
Ipsos	14 Mar 2011	948	2%	6%	–	5%	–	–	23%	–	–	–	5%	8%	7%	1%	–	21%	1%	21%
Ipsos	14 Mar 2011	948	2%	7%	–	5%	–	–	–	23%	–	–	5%	8%	6%	1%	–	21%	1%	21%
Ipsos	14 Mar 2011	948	2%	7%	–	6%	–	–	–	–	17%	–	7%	10%	7%	1%	–	21%	1%	21%
CSA	9–10 Mar 2011	853	1%	8%	–	6%	–	30%	–	–	–	–	4%	5%	4%	1%	–	19%	1%	21%
CSA	9–10 Mar 2011	853	1%	8%	–	5%	–	–	22%	–	–	–	3%	6%	6%	1%	–	24%	1%	23%
CSA	9–10 Mar 2011	853	1%	8%	–	5%	–	–	–	18%	–	–	5%	8%	7%	1%	–	24%	1%	22%
CSA	9–10 Mar 2011	853	1%	8%	–	5%	–	–	–	–	19%	–	6%	7%	6%	1%	–	24%	1%	22%
Ifop	7–9 Mar 2011	1,046	1%	4%	–	5%	–	29%	–	–	–	–	5.5%	6%	3%	1%	–	23%	1.5%	21%
Ifop	7–9 Mar 2011	1,046	1%	4%	–	5%	–	–	24%	–	–	–	6%	7%	4.5%	1.5%	–	24%	1%	22%
Ifop	7–9 Mar 2011	1,046	1%	4%	–	5%	–	–	–	23%	–	–	6.5%	7.5%	4%	2%	–	24%	1%	22%
Ifop	7–9 Mar 2011	1,046	1%	5%	–	6%	–	–	–	–	19%	–	7%	8%	5%	2%	–	24%	1%	22%
Harris Interactive	5–6 Mar 2011	1,347	1%	6%	–	7%	–	23%	–	–	–	–	7%	6%	4%	1%	–	20%	1%	24%
Harris Interactive	5–6 Mar 2011	1,347	1%	6%	–	6%	–	–	–	20%	–	–	7%	8%	5%	1%	–	21%	1%	24%
Harris Interactive	28 Feb–3 Mar 2011	1,618	1%	5%	–	5%	–	–	21%	–	–	–	7%	8%	7%	1%	–	21%	1%	23%

=== 20 August 2010 to 27 February 2011 ===
Polling firm	Fieldwork date	Sample size	Schivardi POI	Arthaud LO	Besancenot NPA	Mélenchon FG	Strauss-Kahn PS	Aubry PS	Hollande PS	Royal PS	Montebourg PS	Hulot SE	Joly EELV/EE	Bayrou MoDem	Villepin RS/UMP	Morin NC	Borloo PR/UMP	Sarkozy UMP	Fillon UMP	Copé UMP	Dupont-Aignan DLR	Le Pen FN
CSA	21–22 Feb 2011	1,005	–	1%	8%	6%	28%	–	–	–	–	–	4%	5.5%	5%	1%	–	23%	–	–	0.5%	18%
CSA	21–22 Feb 2011	1,005	–	1%	8%	6%	33%	–	–	–	–	–	5%	4.5%	5%	1%	–	–	18%	–	0.5%	18%
CSA	21–22 Feb 2011	1,005	–	1%	8%	6%	34%	–	–	–	–	–	4%	5.5%	9%	1%	–	–	–	12%	0.5%	19%
CSA	21–22 Feb 2011	1,005	–	1%	8%	7%	33%	–	–	–	–	–	5%	5.5%	9%	1%	12%	–	–	–	0.5%	18%
TNS Sofres	18–19 Feb 2011	1,000	–	1%	7%	6.5%	29%	–	–	–	–	–	6%	5%	3.5%	4%	–	21%	–	–	–	17%
TNS Sofres	18–19 Feb 2011	1,000	–	0.5%	7%	7%	–	24%	–	–	–	–	6%	5%	4.5%	4.5%	–	24%	–	–	–	17.5%
TNS Sofres	18–19 Feb 2011	1,000	–	1%	8%	7%	–	–	22%	–	–	–	6.5%	5%	5%	4%	–	23%	–	–	–	18.5%
TNS Sofres	18–19 Feb 2011	1,000	–	1%	8%	7.5%	–	–	–	19%	–	–	8%	5%	5%	5%	–	24%	–	–	–	17.5%
TNS Sofres	18–19 Feb 2011	1,000	–	1%	8%	7.5%	–	–	–	–	15%	–	8%	6%	5.5%	5%	–	25%	–	–	–	19%
Ifop	16–17 Feb 2011	949	–	1%	5.5%	6%	26%	–	–	–	–	–	7%	7%	4%	2%	–	22%	–	–	0.5%	19%
Ifop	16–17 Feb 2011	949	–	1%	5%	5.5%	–	22%	–	–	–	–	7%	8%	5%	2.5%	–	23%	–	–	1%	20%
CSA	14–15 Feb 2011	1,005	–	1%	7%	6%	29%	–	–	–	–	–	5%	8%	4%	–	–	22%	–	–	1%	17%
CSA	14–15 Feb 2011	1,005	–	1%	7%	6%	–	22%	–	–	–	–	6%	9%	5%	–	–	26%	–	–	1%	17%
CSA	14–15 Feb 2011	1,005	–	1%	7%	7%	–	–	20%	–	–	–	6%	10%	5%	–	–	26%	–	–	1%	17%
CSA	14–15 Feb 2011	1,005	–	1%	7%	8%	–	–	–	18%	–	–	7%	10%	5%	–	–	26%	–	–	1%	17%
OpinionWay	20–21 Jan 2011	982	0%	1%	5%	9%	29%	–	–	–	–	6%	–	5%	–	–	–	25%	–	–	2%	18%
OpinionWay	20–21 Jan 2011	982	0%	1%	5%	8%	–	25%	–	–	–	6%	–	7%	–	–	–	28%	–	–	2%	18%
OpinionWay	20–21 Jan 2011	982	0%	1%	5%	7%	28%	–	–	–	–	–	8%	6%	–	–	–	25%	–	–	2%	18%
OpinionWay	20–21 Jan 2011	982	0%	1%	4%	7%	–	22%	–	–	–	–	10%	8%	–	–	–	28%	–	–	2%	18%
CSA	17–18 Jan 2011	847	–	2%	5%	5%	30%	–	–	–	–	–	6%	6%	5%	–	–	23%	–	–	1%	17%
CSA	17–18 Jan 2011	847	–	1%	6%	5%	–	22%	–	–	–	–	6%	9%	6%	–	–	27%	–	–	1%	17%
CSA	17–18 Jan 2011	847	–	1%	6%	5%	–	–	20%	–	–	–	8%	9%	7%	–	–	26%	–	–	1%	17%
CSA	17–18 Jan 2011	847	–	1%	4%	5%	–	–	–	21%	–	–	8%	10%	7%	–	–	26%	–	–	1%	17%
BVA	14–15 Jan 2011	804	–	<0.5%	7%	4%	31%	–	–	–	–	–	6%	5%	3%	–	2%	25%	–	–	–	17%
BVA	14–15 Jan 2011	804	–	<0.5%	7%	5%	–	23%	–	–	–	–	5%	6%	5%	–	5%	27%	–	–	–	17%
Ifop	12–13 Jan 2011	830	–	1%	3.5%	6.5%	–	23%	–	–	–	6%	–	8%	6%	2%	–	26.5%	–	–	1%	16.5%
CSA	7–8 Jan 2011	1,001	–	1%	7%	5%	30%	–	–	–	–	–	4%	6%	3%	–	–	25%	–	–	1%	18%
CSA	7–8 Jan 2011	1,001	–	1%	6%	6%	–	22%	–	–	–	–	4%	9%	6%	–	–	28%	–	–	1%	17%
TNS Sofres	19–20 Nov 2010	1,000	–	1.5%	6.5%	6%	27%	–	–	–	–	–	6.5%	6%	4%	–	5%	24%	–	–	–	13.5%
TNS Sofres	19–20 Nov 2010	1,000	–	1%	6.5%	6%	–	23%	–	–	–	–	8%	7%	4%	–	6.5%	25%	–	–	–	13%
TNS Sofres	19–20 Nov 2010	1,000	–	1%	7%	6.5%	–	–	16.5%	–	–	–	8%	8%	5%	–	8.5%	25.5%	–	–	–	14%
TNS Sofres	19–20 Nov 2010	1,000	–	1%	6.5%	7%	–	–	–	17%	–	–	9%	7%	4%	–	8.5%	26%	–	–	–	14%
Ifop	18–19 Nov 2010	811	–	1%	4.5%	6%	29%	–	–	–	–	–	6%	7.5%	6%	2%	–	24%	–	–	1%	13%
Ifop	18–19 Nov 2010	811	–	1%	5%	6%	–	22%	–	–	–	–	7.5%	9%	7%	2.5%	–	27%	–	–	1%	12%
Ifop	18–19 Nov 2010	811	–	1%	6%	7%	–	–	18%	–	–	–	8%	9.5%	8.5%	2%	–	27%	–	–	1%	12%
Ifop	18–19 Nov 2010	811	–	1%	5.5%	7.5%	–	–	–	18%	–	–	8%	9.5%	7.5%	2%	–	27%	–	–	1%	13%
Ifop	16–18 Nov 2010	931	–	0.5%	4%	6.5%	–	23%	–	–	–	–	7%	7%	5%	–	7%	26%	–	–	1%	13%
Harris Interactive	9–10 Nov 2010	910	–	0.5%	4.5%	7%	–	20%	–	–	–	–	11%	8%	9%	–	–	26%	–	–	–	14%
Harris Interactive	9–10 Nov 2010	910	–	0.5%	4.5%	7%	–	20%	–	–	–	–	11%	9%	8%	–	–	–	26%	–	–	14%
Ifop	12–14 Oct 2010	930	–	1%	5%	5%	–	25%	–	–	–	–	7%	8.5%	7%	–	–	26%	–	–	1.5%	14%
BVA	10–11 Sep 2010	962	–	2%	7%	5%	28%	–	–	–	–	–	9%	8%	8.5%	1.5%	–	–	20%	–	–	11%
BVA	10–11 Sep 2010	962	–	1%	5%	4%	–	25%	–	–	–	–	10%	10%	10%	3%	–	–	21%	–	–	11%
TNS Sofres	20–21 Aug 2010	1,000	–	1%	9%	5%	25%	–	–	–	–	–	9%	6%	6%	1%	–	26%	–	–	–	12%
TNS Sofres	20–21 Aug 2010	1,000	–	1%	7%	4%	–	22%	–	–	–	–	9%	7%	7%	2%	–	28%	–	–	–	13%
TNS Sofres	20–21 Aug 2010	1,000	–	1%	8%	5%	–	–	16%	–	–	–	11%	7%	8%	2%	–	29%	–	–	–	13%
TNS Sofres	20–21 Aug 2010	1,000	–	1%	8%	5%	–	–	–	16%	–	–	12%	7%	7%	2%	–	29%	–	–	–	13%

=== 29 October 2009 to 19 August 2010 ===
Polling firm	Fieldwork date	Sample size	Arthaud LO	Besancenot NPA	Buffet PCF	Mélenchon FG	Strauss-Kahn PS	Aubry PS	Hollande PS	Royal PS	Duflot EE/LV	Joly EE	Tapie PRG	Bayrou MoDem	Villepin RS/UMP	Morin NC	Borloo PR/UMP	Sarkozy UMP	Fillon UMP	Dupont-Aignan DLR	Le Pen FN
Ifop	8–9 Jul 2010	834	1%	7%	–	5%	–	26%	–	–	4%	–	–	9%	10%	–	–	26%	–	1%	11%
CSA	7–8 Jul 2010	809	0.5%	7%	2.5%	–	–	30%	–	–	5%	–	–	9%	–	2%	–	31%	–	–	13%
Ifop	3–4 Jun 2010	981	1%	5%	–	6%	–	24%	–	–	5%	–	3%	8%	7%	–	–	27%	–	1%	13%
Ifop	27–28 May 2010	814	1%	7%	–	5%	29%	–	–	–	5%	–	–	8%	6%	–	–	25%	–	1%	13%
Ifop	27–28 May 2010	814	1%	5%	–	5%	–	24%	–	–	5%	–	–	11%	8%	–	–	27%	–	1%	13%
Ifop	27–28 May 2010	814	2%	7%	–	6%	–	–	18%	–	5%	–	–	12%	9%	–	–	27%	–	2%	12%
Ifop	27–28 May 2010	814	1%	7%	–	6%	–	–	–	18%	6%	–	–	12%	9%	–	–	28%	–	1%	12%
CSA	19–20 May 2010	779	1%	6%	3%	–	–	30%	–	–	5%	–	–	8%	–	–	–	36%	–	–	11%
BVA	23–24 Apr 2010	947	1%	5%	–	6%	–	24%	–	–	–	12%	–	7%	–	–	6%	28%	–	–	11%
Ifop	20–22 Apr 2010	934	1%	3%	–	6%	–	25%	–	–	8%	–	–	7%	7%	–	3%	25%	–	2%	13%
Ifop	25–26 Mar 2010	855	1%	5%	–	6%	–	27%	–	–	9%	–	–	7%	6%	–	–	26%	–	2%	11%
CSA	24–25 Mar 2010	843	2%	5%	2%	–	–	31%	–	–	6%	–	–	7%	–	–	–	35%	–	–	12%
CSA	2–3 Mar 2010	757	3%	6%	3%	–	27%	–	–	–	10%	–	–	11%	7%	–	–	–	25%	–	8%
CSA	2–3 Mar 2010	757	3%	7%	3%	–	–	21%	–	–	11%	–	–	11%	9%	–	–	–	27%	–	8%
CSA	2–3 Feb 2010	802	1%	7%	3%	–	22%	–	–	–	9%	–	–	10%	10%	–	–	29%	–	–	9%
CSA	2–3 Feb 2010	802	1%	6%	3%	–	–	19%	–	–	8%	–	–	12%	10%	–	–	32%	–	–	9%
Ifop	29–30 Oct 2009	892	1%	9%	3%	–	–	20%	–	–	5%	–	–	14%	8%	–	–	28%	–	1%	11%

=== 31 October 2007 to 28 October 2009 ===
Polling firm	Fieldwork date	Sample size	Abs.	Schivardi PT	Laguiller LO	Besancenot LCR/NPA	Buffet PCF	Bové SE	Royal PS	Aubry PS	Voynet LV	Nihous CPNT	Bayrou MoDem	Sarkozy UMP	Villiers MPF	Le Pen FN
OpinionWay	17–18 Jun 2009	1,006	–	0.5%	1%	8%	3%	4%	21%	–	4%	0.5%	13%	33%	3%	9%
OpinionWay	17–18 Jun 2009	1,006	–	0.5%	1%	9%	2%	5%	–	19%	4%	0.5%	14%	33%	3%	9%
OpinionWay	29–30 Apr 2009	1,014	–	0.5%	2%	9%	2%	1%	21%	–	3%	0.5%	20%	30%	4%	7%
Ifop	23–24 Apr 2009	854	–	1%	2%	8%	3%	1%	20.5%	–	4%	2%	19%	28%	4%	7.5%
OpinionWay	30 Apr–2 May 2008	1,005	–	0%	1%	8%	2%	2%	27%	–	1%	1%	16%	33%	2%	7%
CSA	26 Feb 2008	856	–	<0.5%	2%	7%	2%	1%	26%	–	1%	<0.5%	19%	32%	1%	9%
Ifop	31 Oct–2 Nov 2007	1,008	–	0.5%	1.5%	7%	2%	1.5%	22%	–	1.5%	1%	17%	35%	2%	9%
2007 election	22 Apr 2007	–	16.23%	0.34%	1.33%	4.08%	1.93%	1.32%	25.87%	–	1.57%	1.15%	18.57%	31.18%	2.23%	10.44%

=== By region ===
Corsica

Polling firm	Fieldwork date	Sample size	Abs.	Arthaud LO	Poutou NPA	Mélenchon FG	Hollande PS	Joly EELV	Bayrou MoDem	Sarkozy UMP	Dupont-Aignan DLR	Le Pen FN	Cheminade S&P
2012 election	22 Apr 2012	–	25.73%	0.31%	1.17%	9.85%	24.28%	2.29%	5.01%	31.41%	1.07%	24.39%	0.21%
OpinionWay	4–5 Apr 2012	502	–	0.5%	1%	12%	28%	3%	10%	32%	0.5%	13%	0%

Réunion

Polling firm	Fieldwork date	Sample size	Abs.	Arthaud LO	Poutou NPA	Mélenchon FG	Hollande PS	Joly EELV	Bayrou MoDem	Sarkozy UMP	Dupont-Aignan DLR	Le Pen FN	Cheminade S&P
2012 election	22 Apr 2012	–	34.41%	0.60%	0.87%	6.73%	53.29%	2.13%	6.83%	17.96%	1.00%	10.31%	0.29%
Ipsos	12–16 Apr 2012	451	–	0.5%	1%	12%	43%	3.5%	10.5%	18.5%	0%	11%	0%
Ipsos	20–27 Mar 2012	446	–	2%	0.5%	12.5%	39%	2.5%	9.5%	24%	0.5%	9.5%	0%

French residents overseas

Polling firm	Fieldwork date	Sample size	Abs.	Arthaud LO	Poutou NPA	Mélenchon FG	Hollande PS	Joly EELV	Bayrou MoDem	Lepage Cap21	Villepin RS	Sarkozy UMP	Dupont-Aignan DLR	Le Pen FN	Cheminade S&P
2012 election	22 Apr 2012	–	60.93%	0.28%	0.70%	8.31%	28.32%	5.44%	11.37%	–	–	38.01%	1.25%	5.95%	0.36%
OpinionWay	12–23 Mar 2012	2,031	–	0%	0.5%	8%	27%	4%	13%	0.5%	2%	37%	1%	7%	–

=== By commune ===
Aubagne

Polling firm	Fieldwork date	Sample size	Abs.	Arthaud LO	Poutou NPA	Mélenchon FG	Hollande PS	Joly EELV	Bayrou MoDem	Sarkozy UMP	Dupont-Aignan DLR	Le Pen FN	Cheminade S&P
2012 election	22 Apr 2012	–	18.73%	0.34%	0.75%	18.67%	21.06%	2.08%	5.83%	25.50%	1.43%	24.15%	0.18%
CSA	29–30 Mar 2012	801	–	1%	1%	24%	22%	2%	6%	23%	0%	21%	0%

== Second round ==
Starting on 12 January 2012, Ifop-Fiducial published a "rolling" poll for Paris Match and Europe 1 which is listed in the tables below as "Ifop-Fiducial" without an asterisk, while separate polls not conducted as part of the "rolling" poll are listed with an asterisk (*). Polls conducted specifically for subsample data are listed with two asterisks (**).

The publication of second-round polls was prohibited after midnight on 4 May 2012.

=== Graphical summary ===
The averages in the graphs below were constructed using polls listed below conducted by the eight major French pollsters. The graphs are 14-day weighted moving averages, using only the most recent poll conducted by any given pollster within that range (each poll weighted based on recency).

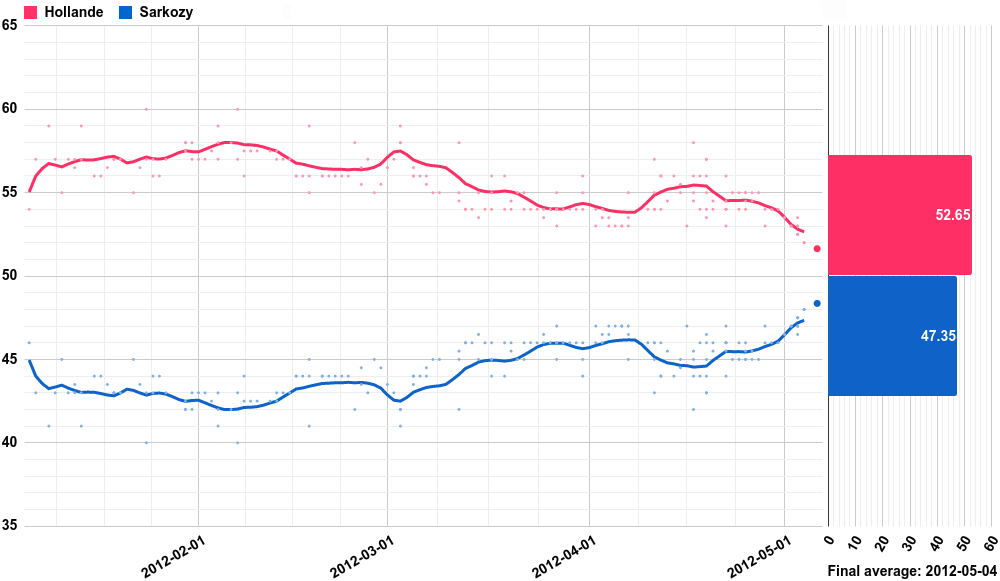

=== Hollande–Sarkozy ===
Polling firm	Fieldwork date	Sample size	Abs.	Hollande PS	Sarkozy UMP
2012 election	6 May 2012	–	19.65%	51.64%	48.36%
Ifop-Fiducial *	2–4 May 2012	1,766	18%	52%	48%
Ifop-Fiducial	1–4 May 2012	1,225	–	52%	48%
BVA	3 May 2012	2,161	–	52.5%	47.5%
CSA	3 May 2012	1,002	–	53%	47%
Ipsos	3 May 2012	1,018	18%	52.5%	47.5%
TNS Sofres	3 May 2012	1,000	20%	53.5%	46.5%
Harris Interactive	2–3 May 2012	1,072	–	53%	47%
OpinionWay	2–3 May 2012	2,009	–	52.5%	47.5%
Ifop-Fiducial	30 Apr–3 May 2012	968	–	53%	47%
Ifop-Fiducial	28 Apr–2 May 2012	1,229	–	53%	47%
LH2	27 Apr–2 May 2012	1,077	–	53%	47%
BVA	30 Apr–1 May 2012	1,387	20%	53.5%	46.5%
Ifop-Fiducial	28 Apr–1 May 2012	904	–	53.5%	46.5%
Ifop-Fiducial	26–30 Apr 2012	898	–	54%	46%
Ifop-Fiducial*	26–29 Apr 2012	1,876	–	54%	46%
Ipsos	27–28 Apr 2012	988	18%	53%	47%
LH2	27–28 Apr 2012	958	–	54%	46%
Ifop-Fiducial	24–27 Apr 2012	963	–	55%	45%
Harris Interactive	25–26 Apr 2012	1,032	–	55%	45%
Ifop-Fiducial	23–26 Apr 2012	966	–	54.5%	45.5%
BVA	24–25 Apr 2012	2,285	–	54.5%	45.5%
CSA	24–25 Apr 2012	1,009	–	54%	46%
TNS Sofres	24–25 Apr 2012	1,000	21%	55%	45%
Ifop-Fiducial	22–25 Apr 2012	1,507	–	55%	45%
OpinionWay	23–24 Apr 2012	1,145	–	54%	46%
Ifop-Fiducial	22–24 Apr 2012	1,185	–	55%	45%
Ifop-Fiducial	22–23 Apr 2012	865	–	55%	45%
BVA	22 Apr 2012	678	–	53%	47%
CSA	22 Apr 2012	1,009	–	56%	44%
Harris Interactive	22 Apr 2012	1,088	–	54%	46%
Ifop-Fiducial*	22 Apr 2012	1,004	–	54.5%	45.5%
Ipsos	22 Apr 2012	1,090	19%	54%	46%
OpinionWay	22 Apr 2012	7,900	–	54%	46%
Ifop-Fiducial*	18–20 Apr 2012	1,723	–	54.5%	45.5%
Ifop-Fiducial	17–20 Apr 2012	2,592	–	54%	46%
BVA	18–19 Apr 2012	2,161	–	57%	43%
CSA	18–19 Apr 2012	1,005	–	57%	43%
Harris Interactive	18–19 Apr 2012	1,068	–	54%	46%
Ipsos	18–19 Apr 2012	1,021	–	56%	44%
TNS Sofres	18–19 Apr 2012	1,000	–	55%	45%
Ifop-Fiducial	16–19 Apr 2012	2,588	–	53.5%	46.5%
LH2	17–18 Apr 2012	956	–	56%	44%
Ifop-Fiducial	14–18 Apr 2012	2,552	–	54%	46%
BVA	16–17 Apr 2012	1,161	–	56%	44%
CSA	16–17 Apr 2012	886	–	58%	42%
OpinionWay	16–17 Apr 2012	1,002	26%	55%	45%
Ifop-Fiducial	14–17 Apr 2012	1,709	–	54.5%	45.5%
Harris Interactive	12–16 Apr 2012	991	–	53%	47%
Ifop-Fiducial*	12–15 Apr 2012	1,808	–	55.5%	44.5%
Ifop-Fiducial	12–15 Apr 2012	1,711	–	55%	45%
Ipsos	13–14 Apr 2012	894	–	56%	44%
Ifop-Fiducial	10–13 Apr 2012	2,562	–	54.5%	45.5%
BVA	11–12 Apr 2012	885	–	56%	44%
TNS Sofres	11–12 Apr 2012	1,000	–	56%	44%
Ifop-Fiducial	9–12 Apr 2012	2,562	–	54%	46%
CSA	10–11 Apr 2012	1,013	–	57%	43%
LH2	10–11 Apr 2012	977	–	55%	45%
OpinionWay	10–11 Apr 2012	1,007	–	54%	46%
Ifop-Fiducial	6–11 Apr 2012	2,285	–	54%	46%
Ifop-Fiducial	6–10 Apr 2012	1,425	–	54%	46%
Ipsos	6–7 Apr 2012	955	–	55%	45%
Ifop-Fiducial*	5–7 Apr 2012	1,869	–	53%	47%
Ifop-Fiducial	5–7 Apr 2012	1,002	–	53.5%	46.5%
Harris Interactive	3–6 Apr 2012	1,033	–	53%	47%
Ifop-Fiducial	3–6 Apr 2012	1,284	–	53%	47%
Ifop-Fiducial	2–5 Apr 2012	1,060	–	53%	47%
OpinionWay	3–4 Apr 2012	969	–	53%	47%
Ifop-Fiducial	31 Mar–4 Apr 2012	1,432	–	53.5%	46.5%
CSA	2–3 Apr 2012	884	–	54%	46%
Ifop-Fiducial	31 Mar–3 Apr 2012	999	–	53.5%	46.5%
Harris Interactive	29 Mar–2 Apr 2012	1,059	–	53%	47%
Ifop-Fiducial	29 Mar–2 Apr 2012	893	–	54%	46%
Ipsos	30–31 Mar 2012	881	–	55%	45%
LH2	30–31 Mar 2012	973	–	54%	46%
BVA	29–31 Mar 2012	2,555	–	56%	44%
Ifop-Fiducial	27–30 Mar 2012	957	–	54%	46%
Ifop-Fiducial	26–29 Mar 2012	950	–	54%	46%
Ifop-Fiducial	24–28 Mar 2012	1,211	–	54%	46%
CSA	26–27 Mar 2012	876	–	53%	47%
OpinionWay	26–27 Mar 2012	1,148	–	54%	46%
TNS Sofres	26–27 Mar 2012	1,000	–	55%	45%
Ifop-Fiducial	24–27 Mar 2012	902	–	54%	46%
Harris Interactive	22–26 Mar 2012	1,231	–	54%	46%
Ifop-Fiducial*	22–25 Mar 2012	1,769	–	54%	46%
Ifop-Fiducial	22–25 Mar 2012	887	–	53.5%	46.5%
Ipsos	23–24 Mar 2012	978	–	54%	46%
Ifop-Fiducial	20–23 Mar 2012	942	–	54%	46%
BVA	21–22 Mar 2012	926	–	54%	46%
Ifop-Fiducial	19–22 Mar 2012	945	–	55%	45%
Ifop-Fiducial	17–21 Mar 2012	1,195	–	55%	45%
CSA	19–20 Mar 2012	888	–	54%	46%
Ifop-Fiducial	17–20 Mar 2012	876	–	54.5%	45.5%
Harris Interactive	15–19 Mar 2012	1,097	–	56%	44%
Ifop-Fiducial	15–19 Mar 2012	881	–	54%	46%
Ifop	16–17 Mar 2012	961	–	54%	46%
Ipsos	16–17 Mar 2012	950	–	56%	44%
LH2	16–17 Mar 2012	962	–	55%	45%
Ifop-Fiducial	13–16 Mar 2012	928	–	54%	46%
OpinionWay	14–15 Mar 2012	1,183	–	55%	45%
Ifop-Fiducial	12–15 Mar 2012	928	–	53.5%	46.5%
Ifop-Fiducial	11–14 Mar 2012	1,187	–	54%	46%
CSA	12–13 Mar 2012	861	–	54%	46%
Ifop-Fiducial	11–13 Mar 2012	875	–	54%	46%
TNS Sofres	12 Mar 2012	1,000	–	58%	42%
Ifop-Fiducial*	11–12 Mar 2012	1,638	–	54.5%	45.5%
Ifop-Fiducial	8–12 Mar 2012	874	–	55%	45%
Ifop-Fiducial	6–9 Mar 2012	922	–	55%	45%
Ifop-Fiducial	5–8 Mar 2012	924	–	55%	45%
OpinionWay	5–7 Mar 2012	1,098	–	56%	44%
Ifop-Fiducial	3–7 Mar 2012	1,182	–	55.5%	44.5%
Ifop-Fiducial	3–6 Mar 2012	877	–	56%	44%
CSA	5 Mar 2012	888	–	56%	44%
Harris Interactive	1–5 Mar 2012	975	–	56%	44%
Ifop-Fiducial	1–5 Mar 2012	867	–	56.5%	43.5%
BVA	2–3 Mar 2012	761	–	59%	41%
Ipsos	2–3 Mar 2012	966	–	58%	42%
LH2	2–3 Mar 2012	971	–	58%	42%
Ifop-Fiducial	28 Feb–2 Mar 2012	912	–	57%	43%
Ifop-Fiducial	27 Feb–1 Mar 2012	929	–	56.5%	43.5%
Ifop-Fiducial	24–29 Feb 2012	1,187	–	55.5%	44.5%
Ifop-Fiducial	24–28 Feb 2012	888	–	55%	45%
TNS Sofres	27 Feb 2012	1,000	–	57%	43%
Ifop-Fiducial*	23–26 Feb 2012	1,723	–	56.5%	43.5%
Ifop-Fiducial	23–26 Feb 2012	882	–	55.5%	44.5%
Ipsos	24–25 Feb 2012	959	–	58%	42%
Ifop-Fiducial	21–24 Feb 2012	931	–	56%	44%
Ifop-Fiducial	20–23 Feb 2012	931	–	56%	44%
Ifop-Fiducial	18–22 Feb 2012	1,180	–	56%	44%
Ifop-Fiducial	18–21 Feb 2012	874	–	56%	44%
CSA	20 Feb 2012	891	–	56%	44%
Ifop-Fiducial	16–20 Feb 2012	872	–	56%	44%
Ipsos	17–18 Feb 2012	969	–	59%	41%
LH2	17–18 Feb 2012	967	–	55%	45%
OpinionWay	17–18 Feb 2012	975	–	56%	44%
Ifop-Fiducial	14–17 Feb 2012	938	–	56%	44%
BVA	15–16 Feb 2012	930	–	56%	44%
Ifop-Fiducial	13–16 Feb 2012	939	–	56%	44%
Ifop-Fiducial	11–15 Feb 2012	1,174	–	57%	43%
Ifop-Fiducial	11–14 Feb 2012	867	–	57%	43%
Harris Interactive	9–13 Feb 2012	954	–	57%	43%
Ifop-Fiducial	9–13 Feb 2012	870	–	57.5%	42.5%
Ifop-Fiducial*	9–12 Feb 2012	1,723	–	57.5%	42.5%
Ifop-Fiducial	7–10 Feb 2012	923	–	57.5%	42.5%
Ifop-Fiducial	6–9 Feb 2012	913	–	57.5%	42.5%
OpinionWay	6–8 Feb 2012	1,215	–	56%	44%
Ifop-Fiducial	4–8 Feb 2012	1,179	–	57.5%	42.5%
CSA	6–7 Feb 2012	869	–	60%	40%
Ifop-Fiducial	4–7 Feb 2012	871	–	57%	43%
Ifop-Fiducial	2–6 Feb 2012	876	–	58%	42%
BVA	3–4 Feb 2012	779	–	58%	42%
Ipsos	3–4 Feb 2012	953	–	59%	41%
LH2	3–4 Feb 2012	955	–	57%	43%
Ifop-Fiducial	31 Jan–3 Feb 2012	922	–	57.5%	42.5%
Ifop-Fiducial	30 Jan–2 Feb 2012	917	–	57%	43%
Ifop-Fiducial	29 Jan–1 Feb 2012	1,166	–	57%	43%
BVA	30–31 Jan 2012	1,407	–	57%	43%
Ifop-Fiducial	29–31 Jan 2012	866	–	58%	42%
TNS Sofres	30 Jan 2012	1,000	–	58%	42%
Ifop-Fiducial*	29–30 Jan 2012	1,387	–	58%	42%
Ifop-Fiducial	27–30 Jan 2012	871	–	57.5%	42.5%
Ifop-Fiducial	24–27 Jan 2012	935	–	57%	43%
Ifop-Fiducial	23–26 Jan 2012	926	–	56%	44%
OpinionWay	23–25 Jan 2012	1,087	–	56%	44%
Ifop-Fiducial	21–25 Jan 2012	1,178	–	57%	43%
CSA	23–24 Jan 2012	898	–	60%	40%
Ifop-Fiducial	21–24 Jan 2012	864	–	57%	43%
Ifop-Fiducial	20–23 Jan 2012	877	–	56.5%	43.5%
Harris Interactive	19–22 Jan 2012	1,029	–	55%	45%
Ifop-Fiducial	17–20 Jan 2012	937	–	57%	43%
BVA	18–19 Jan 2012	959	–	57%	43%
Ifop-Fiducial	16–19 Jan 2012	923	–	57%	43%
Ifop-Fiducial	14–18 Jan 2012	1,168	–	56.5%	43.5%
Ifop-Fiducial	14–17 Jan 2012	864	–	56%	44%
Ifop-Fiducial	13–16 Jan 2012	872	–	56%	44%
Ipsos	13–14 Jan 2012	948	–	59%	41%
LH2	13–14 Jan 2012	966	–	57%	43%
Ifop-Fiducial*	11–13 Jan 2012	1,550	–	57%	43%
Ifop-Fiducial	10–13 Jan 2012	942	–	56.5%	43.5%
Ifop-Fiducial	9–12 Jan 2012	943	–	57%	43%
OpinionWay	10–11 Jan 2012	967	–	55%	45%
CSA	9–10 Jan 2012	875	–	57%	43%
TNS Sofres **	6–9 Jan 2012	2,007	–	59%	41%
BVA	6–7 Jan 2012	815	–	57%	43%
Ifop	4–6 Jan 2012	1,163	–	54%	46%
OpinionWay	16–19 Dec 2011	913	–	57%	43%
Harris Interactive	13–15 Dec 2011	1,031	–	57%	43%
Ifop	13–15 Dec 2011	937	–	56%	44%
OpinionWay	13–15 Dec 2011	912	–	57%	43%
CSA	12–13 Dec 2011	859	–	58%	42%
LH2	9–10 Dec 2011	953	–	57%	43%
BVA	2–3 Dec 2011	798	–	59%	41%
Ipsos	2–3 Dec 2011	955	–	60%	40%
Ifop	29–30 Nov 2011	934	–	56%	44%
TNS Sofres	25–26 Nov 2011	1,003	–	60%	40%
OpinionWay	23–24 Nov 2011	952	–	58%	42%
BVA	18–19 Nov 2011	784	–	58%	42%
LH2	18–19 Nov 2011	830	–	58%	42%
CSA	14–15 Nov 2011	822	–	59%	41%
BVA	4–5 Nov 2011	796	–	61%	39%
Ifop	2–4 Nov 2011	1,843	–	57%	43%
Ipsos	28–29 Oct 2011	970	–	62%	38%
LH2	21–22 Oct 2011	813	–	60%	40%
Ifop	18–20 Oct 2011	941	–	60%	40%
BVA	17–18 Oct 2011	753	–	64%	36%
CSA	17 Oct 2011	859	–	62%	38%
LH2	30 Sep–1 Oct 2011	843	–	60%	40%
LH2	2–3 Sep 2011	818	–	57%	43%
Ifop	30 Aug–2 Sep 2011	1,918	–	59%	41%
Ifop	19–21 Jul 2011	948	–	57%	43%
BVA	8–9 Jul 2011	782	–	58%	42%
LH2	8–9 Jul 2011	827	–	60%	40%
Harris Interactive	3–5 Jun 2011	1,449	–	60%	40%
BVA	20–21 May 2011	960	–	62%	38%
TNS Sofres	20–21 May 2011	960	–	58%	42%
LH2	6–7 May 2011	576	–	60%	40%
Ifop	20–21 Apr 2011	917	–	56%	44%
TNS Sofres	18–19 Feb 2011	1,000	–	56%	44%
CSA	14–15 Feb 2011	1,005	–	54%	46%
CSA	17–18 Jan 2011	847	–	55%	45%
TNS Sofres	19–20 Nov 2010	1,000	–	55%	45%
Ifop	18–19 Nov 2010	811	–	53%	47%
TNS Sofres	20–21 Aug 2010	1,000	–	50%	50%
CSA	4–5 Nov 2009	910	–	43%	57%

==== By first round vote ====
Polling firm	Fieldwork date	Sample size	Jean-Luc Mélenchon (11.10% in the first round)			François Bayrou (9.13% in the first round)			Marine Le Pen (17.90% in the first round)		
Polling firm	Fieldwork date	Sample size	Hollande	Sarkozy	No vote	Hollande	Sarkozy	No vote	Hollande	Sarkozy	No vote
Ifop-Fiducial *	2–4 May 2012	1,766	84%	4%	12%	29%	42%	29%	16%	54%	30%
Ifop-Fiducial	1–4 May 2012	1,225	84%	4%	12%	31%	37%	32%	19%	55%	26%
BVA	3 May 2012	2,161	87%	4%	9%	36%	40%	24%	22%	57%	21%
CSA	3 May 2012	1,002	81%	7%	12%	25%	38%	37%	17%	57%	26%
Ipsos	3 May 2012	1,018	76%	6%	18%	30%	38%	32%	15%	54%	31%
TNS Sofres	3 May 2012	1,000	85%	2%	13%	37%	32%	31%	7%	52%	41%
Harris Interactive	2–3 May 2012	1,072	91%	4%	5%	42%	41%	17%	20%	58%	22%
OpinionWay	2–3 May 2012	2,009	77%	9%	14%	35%	39%	26%	19%	50%	31%
Ifop-Fiducial	30 Apr–3 May 2012	968	86%	5%	9%	32%	34%	34%	18%	50%	32%
Ifop-Fiducial	28 Apr–2 May 2012	1,229	82%	5%	10%	26%	32%	42%	16%	45%	39%
LH2	27 Apr–2 May 2012	1,077	93%	2%	5%	39%	31%	30%	22%	50%	28%
BVA	30 Apr–1 May 2012	1,387	87%	4%	9%	36%	36%	28%	21%	57%	22%
Ifop-Fiducial	28 Apr–1 May 2012	904	85%	6%	9%	28%	32%	40%	15%	46%	39%
Ifop-Fiducial	26–30 Apr 2012	898	86%	4%	10%	33%	27%	40%	18%	44%	38%
Ifop-Fiducial*	26–29 Apr 2012	1,876	80%	6%	14%	28%	31%	41%	18%	43%	39%
Ipsos	27–28 Apr 2012	988	80%	3%	17%	34%	40%	26%	14%	54%	32%
LH2	27–28 Apr 2012	958	73%	2%	25%	30%	31%	39%	20%	45%	35%
Ifop-Fiducial	24–27 Apr 2012	963	85%	4%	11%	33%	31%	36%	23%	45%	32%
Harris Interactive	25–26 Apr 2012	1,032	92%	2%	6%	41%	36%	23%	21%	48%	31%
Ifop-Fiducial	23–26 Apr 2012	966	81%	5%	14%	33%	37%	30%	23%	45%	32%
BVA	24–25 Apr 2012	2,285	89%	5%	6%	38%	41%	21%	26%	47%	27%
CSA	24–25 Apr 2012	1,009	85%	5%	10%	42%	36%	22%	23%	53%	24%
TNS Sofres	24–25 Apr 2012	1,000	82%	6%	12%	32%	39%	29%	16%	51%	33%
Ifop-Fiducial	22–25 Apr 2012	1,507	81%	3%	16%	40%	35%	25%	21%	44%	35%
OpinionWay	23–24 Apr 2012	1,145	91%	2%	7%	36%	41%	23%	27%	47%	26%
Ifop-Fiducial	22–24 Apr 2012	1,185	82%	3%	15%	43%	34%	23%	21%	43%	36%
Ifop-Fiducial	22–23 Apr 2012	865	82%	2%	16%	44%	35%	21%	22%	42%	36%
BVA	22 Apr 2012	678	90%	6%	4%	36%	39%	25%	20%	57%	23%
CSA	22 Apr 2012	1,009	91%	3%	6%	40%	25%	35%	27%	52%	21%
Harris Interactive	22 Apr 2012	1,088	83%	2%	15%	38%	32%	30%	17%	44%	39%
Ifop-Fiducial*	22 Apr 2012	1,004	83%	6%	11%	32%	38%	30%	31%	48%	21%
Ipsos	22 Apr 2012	1,090	86%	3%	11%	33%	32%	35%	18%	60%	22%
OpinionWay	22 Apr 2012	7,900	77%	5%	18%	34%	37%	29%	18%	37%	45%

==== By region ====
Corsica

Polling firm	Fieldwork date	Sample size	Abs.	Hollande PS	Sarkozy UMP
2012 election	6 May 2012	–	23.67%	44.13%	55.87%
OpinionWay	27–30 Apr 2012	404	–	47%	53%

Réunion

Polling firm	Fieldwork date	Sample size	Abs.	Hollande PS	Sarkozy UMP
2012 election	6 May 2012	–	27.14%	71.49%	28.51%
Ipsos	12–16 Apr 2012	451	–	74%	26%
Ipsos	20–27 Mar 2012	446	–	67%	33%

French residents overseas

Polling firm	Fieldwork date	Sample size	Abs.	Hollande PS	Sarkozy UMP
2012 election	6 May 2012	–	57.82%	46.95%	53.05%
OpinionWay	12–23 Mar 2012	2,031	–	74%	26%

==== By commune ====
Aubagne

Polling firm	Fieldwork date	Sample size	Abs.	Hollande PS	Sarkozy UMP
2012 election	6 May 2012	–	19.10%	48.59%	51.41%
CSA	29–30 Mar 2012	801	–	57%	43%

=== Aubry–Sarkozy ===
Polling firm	Fieldwork date	Sample size	Aubry PS	Sarkozy UMP
LH2	30 Sep–1 Oct 2011	843	57%	43%
LH2	2–3 Sep 2011	818	54%	46%
Ifop	30 Aug–2 Sep 2011	1,918	54%	46%
Ifop	19–21 Jul 2011	948	53%	47%
BVA	8–9 Jul 2011	782	58%	42%
LH2	8–9 Jul 2011	827	58%	42%
Harris Interactive	3–5 Jun 2011	1,449	58%	42%
BVA	20–21 May 2011	960	59%	41%
TNS Sofres	20–21 May 2011	960	56%	44%
LH2	6–7 May 2011	565	56%	44%
Ifop	20–21 Apr 2011	917	55%	45%
OpinionWay	6–7 Apr 2011	991	56.0%	44.0%
TNS Sofres	18–19 Feb 2011	1,000	56%	44%
CSA	14–15 Feb 2011	1,005	54%	46%
CSA	17–18 Jan 2011	847	56%	44%
BVA	14–15 Jan 2011	804	57%	43%
TNS Sofres	19–20 Nov 2010	1,000	55%	45%
Ifop	18–19 Nov 2010	811	52%	48%
Harris Interactive	9–10 Nov 2010	910	51%	49%
TNS Sofres	20–21 Aug 2010	1,000	53%	47%
CSA	7–8 Jul 2010	809	52%	48%
CSA	19–20 May 2010	779	51%	49%
CSA	24–25 Mar 2010	843	52%	48%
CSA	2–3 Feb 2010	802	48%	52%
CSA	4–5 Nov 2009	910	47%	53%

=== Royal–Sarkozy ===
Polling firm	Fieldwork date	Sample size	Abs.	Royal PS	Sarkozy UMP
LH2	2–3 Sep 2011	818	–	49%	51%
Harris Interactive	3–5 Jun 2011	1,449	–	51%	49%
LH2	6–7 May 2011	554	–	50%	50%
Ifop	20–21 Apr 2011	917	–	51%	49%
TNS Sofres	18–19 Feb 2011	1,000	–	52%	48%
CSA	14–15 Feb 2011	1,005	–	50%	50%
CSA	17–18 Jan 2011	847	–	50%	50%
TNS Sofres	19–20 Nov 2010	1,000	–	52%	48%
Ifop	18–19 Nov 2010	811	–	53%	47%
TNS Sofres	20–21 Aug 2010	1,000	–	49%	51%
CSA	4–5 Nov 2009	910	–	45%	55%
LH2	2–3 May 2008	1,004	–	53%	47%
OpinionWay	30 Apr–2 May 2008	1,005	–	50%	50%
CSA	26 Feb 2008	856	–	51%	49%
Ifop	31 Oct–2 Nov 2007	1,008	–	45%	55%
2007 election	6 May 2007	–	16.03%	46.94%	53.06%

=== Strauss-Kahn–Sarkozy ===
Polling firm	Fieldwork date	Sample size	Strauss-Kahn PS	Sarkozy UMP
BVA	8–9 Jul 2011	782	54%	46%
LH2	6–7 May 2011	574	65%	35%
Ifop	20–21 Apr 2011	917	61%	39%
TNS Sofres	18–19 Feb 2011	1,000	63%	37%
CSA	14–15 Feb 2011	1,005	61%	39%
CSA	17–18 Jan 2011	847	64%	36%
BVA	14–15 Jan 2011	804	64%	36%
TNS Sofres	19–20 Nov 2010	1,000	62%	38%
Ifop	18–19 Nov 2010	811	59%	41%
TNS Sofres	20–21 Aug 2010	1,000	59%	41%
CSA	2–3 Feb 2010	802	52%	48%
CSA	4–5 Nov 2009	910	51%	49%

=== Sarkozy–Le Pen ===
Polling firm	Fieldwork date	Sample size	Sarkozy UMP	Le Pen FN
Harris Interactive	3–5 Jun 2011	1,449	63%	37%
LH2	6–7 May 2011	517	74%	26%
Ifop	20–21 Apr 2011	917	73%	27%
OpinionWay	6–7 Apr 2011	991	63.3%	36.7%

=== Hollande–Le Pen ===
Polling firm	Fieldwork date	Sample size	Hollande PS	Le Pen FN
LH2	6–7 May 2011	584	76%	24%
Ifop	20–21 Apr 2011	917	72%	28%

=== Aubry–Le Pen ===
Polling firm	Fieldwork date	Sample size	Aubry PS	Le Pen FN
LH2	6–7 May 2011	562	71%	29%
Ifop	20–21 Apr 2011	917	69%	31%
OpinionWay	6–7 Apr 2011	991	63.2%	36.8%

=== Strauss-Kahn–Le Pen ===
Polling firm	Fieldwork date	Sample size	Strauss-Kahn PS	Le Pen FN
LH2	6–7 May 2011	589	77%	23%
Ifop	20–21 Apr 2011	917	75%	25%

=== Aubry–Fillon ===
Polling firm	Fieldwork date	Sample size	Aubry PS	Fillon UMP
Harris Interactive	9–10 Nov 2010	910	49%	51%
BVA	10–11 Sep 2010	962	51%	49%
CSA	2–3 Mar 2010	757	51%	49%

=== Strauss-Kahn–Fillon ===
Polling firm	Fieldwork date	Sample size	Strauss-Kahn PS	Fillon UMP
BVA	10–11 Sep 2010	962	55%	45%
CSA	2–3 Mar 2010	757	54%	46%

=== Delanoë–Sarkozy ===
Polling firm	Fieldwork date	Sample size	Delanoë PS	Sarkozy UMP
CSA	4–5 Nov 2009	910	47%	53%

=== Bayrou–Sarkozy ===
Polling firm	Fieldwork date	Sample size	Bayrou MoDem	Sarkozy UMP
CSA	4–5 Nov 2009	910	49%	51%

== See also ==
- Opinion polling for the French legislative election, 2012
- Opinion polling for the French presidential election, 2002
- Opinion polling for the French presidential election, 2007
- Opinion polling for the French presidential election, 2017
