= Géraldine Bannier =

French politician

Member of the National Assembly for Mayenne's 2nd constituency
- Incumbent
- Assumed office 21 June 2017
- Preceded by: Guillaume Chevrollier
- Parliamentary group: MoDem

Mayor of Courbeveille
- In office 23 March 2014 – 1 September 2017
- Preceded by: Monique Collet
- Succeeded by: Jean-Luc Moussu

Personal details
- Born: 22 November 1979 (age 46) Laval, France
- Party: MoDem
- Education: University of Rennes 2
- Profession: Associate professor of classics

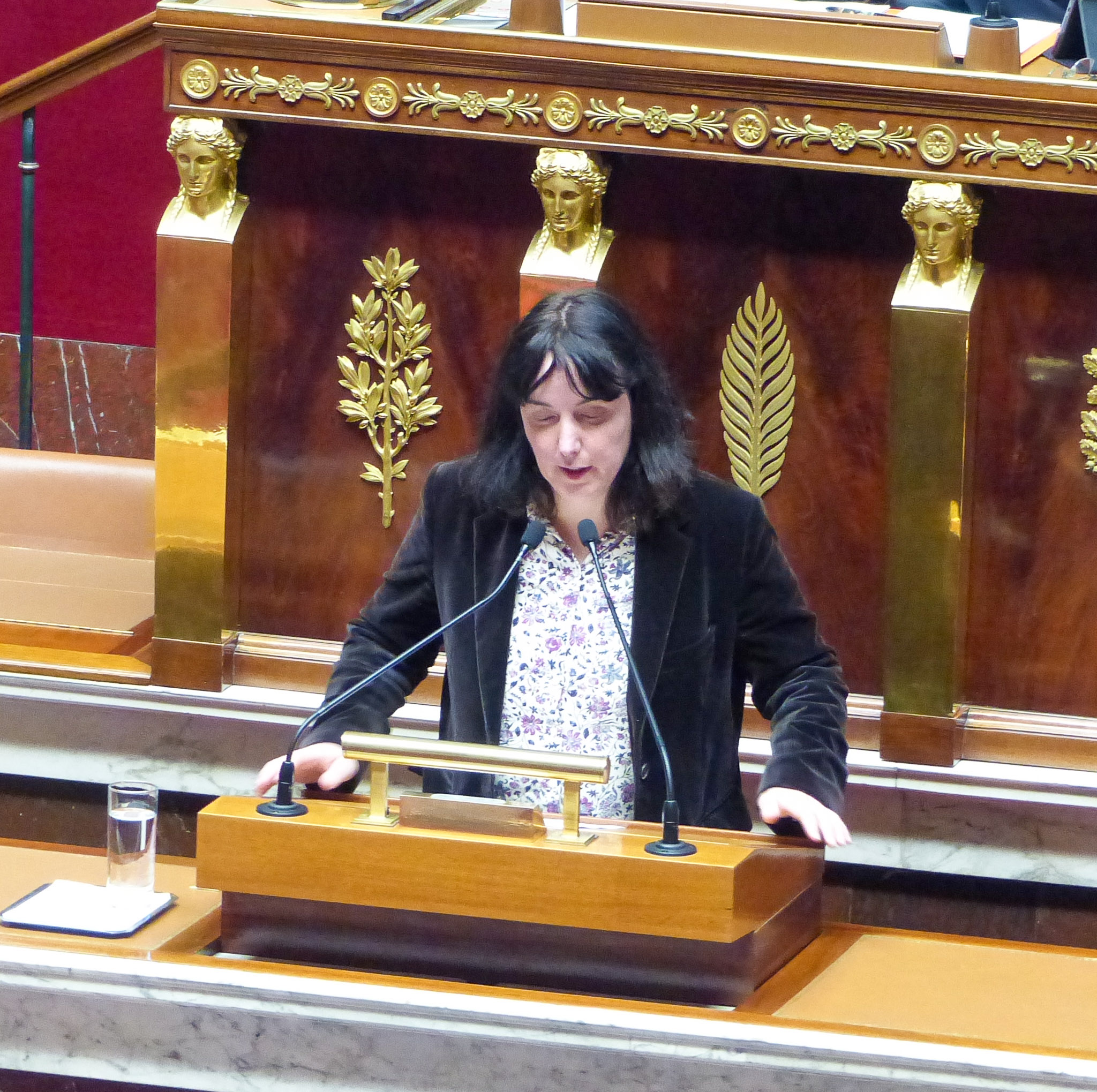

Géraldine Bannier (French pronunciation: [ʒeʁaldin banje]; born 22 November 1979) is a French teacher and politician who has served as Member of the National Assembly for Mayenne's 2nd constituency since 2017. She is a member of the Democratic Movement (MoDem).

== Political career ==
=== Entry into politics ===
Géraldine Bannier joined the Democratic Movement (MoDem) in 2007 and was soon elected to the party's national council. She was Jean-Noël Martin's designated substitute in his unsuccessful campaign to represent the Canton of Saint-Berthevin in the 2011 cantonal elections, with their ticket winning 7.48% of the vote. Three years later, in the 2014 French municipal elections, Bannier was elected mayor of Courbeveille as part of a nonpartisan electoral list.

As a rare example of a successful MoDem politician in Mayenne, Bannier was placed sixth in a Republican-Democratic and Independent-MoDem list led by Yannick Favennec in the department for the 2015 French regional elections in Pays de la Loire. The first candidate on the list was Bruno Retailleau.

During the 2017 French legislative elections, Bannier was the candidate of the electoral alliance between MoDem and La République En Marche (LREM) in Mayenne's 2nd constituency. She led in the first round with 38% of the vote and won the second round with 55% of the vote against incumbent Guillaume Chevrollier of The Republicans (LR). As a result, Bannier became the first female deputy to be elected in Mayenne.

Due to the law on the accumulation of electoral mandates, Bannier resigned from the office of mayor of Courbeveille on 1 September 2017.

=== National Assembly ===
In the National Assembly, Bannier serves on the Committee on Economic Affairs and the Committee on Cultural Affairs and Education. She has notably agitated for the revaluation of pensions for farmers and their spouses and also voted for the reintroduction of neonicotinoid insecticides.

In 2018, Bannier became the vice-president of the parliamentary commission investigating the Lactalis affair, where the eponymous company's baby formula was found to be contaminated with Salmonella.

In 2019, Bannier broke ranks with her government and parliamentary group by voting against the ratification of the Comprehensive Economic and Trade Agreement (CETA) free trade agreement.

In 2020, Bannier abstained in a vote on the Global Security Law during its first reading but ultimately voted in favour of the law in April 2021.

Bannier also served as the spokesperson for a bill aiming to impose a minimum fee for book deliveries.

Bannier was re-nominated by the governing coalition, now known as Ensemble, for the 2022 French legislative elections. She was nevertheless opposed by Christophe Langouët, the mayor of Cossé-le-Vivien, who also declared his support for the presidential majority. Bannier was ultimately re-elected to the National Assembly with nearly 59% of the vote in the second round against the New Ecological and Social People's Union's Grégory Boisseau, who received 41%.

== Personal life ==
Bannier is the daughter of farmers from Astillé. She is unmarried and has no children. In her professional life, Bannier is an associate professor of classics.
