= Guillaume Chevrollier =

French politician (born 1974)

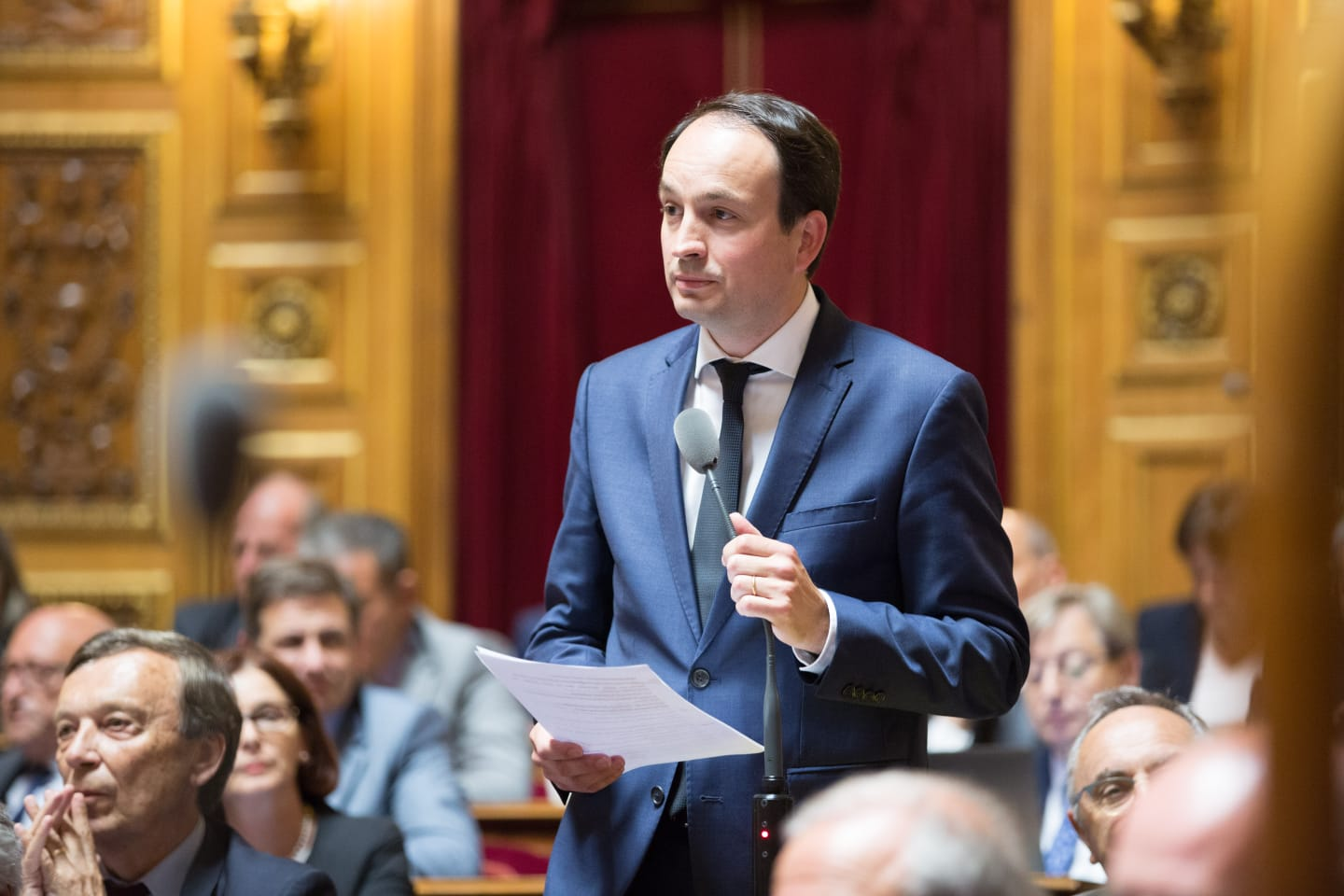
- Chevrollier in 2021

Member of the Senate
- Incumbent
- Assumed office 2 October 2017
- Constituency: Mayenne

Member of the French National Assembly for Mayenne's 2nd constituency
- In office 20 June 2012 – 20 June 2017
- Preceded by: Marc Bernier
- Succeeded by: Géraldine Bannier

Personal details
- Born: 27 October 1974 (age 51)
- Party: The Republicans (since 2015)

Guillaume Chevrollier (born 27 October 1974) is a French politician serving as a member of the Senate since 2017. From 2012 to 2017, he was a member of the National Assembly.
