= Courbeveille =

- Commune
- Location of Courbeveille
- Location within France Location within Pays de la Loire
- Coordinates: 47°59′37″N 0°53′10″W
- Country: France
- Region: Pays de la Loire
- Department: Mayenne
- Arrondissement: Château-Gontier
- Canton: Cossé-le-Vivien

Government
  - Mayor (2020–2026): Jean-Noël Ambrois
- Area^{1}: 18.02 km^{2} (6.96 sq mi)
- Elevation: 120 m (390 ft)
- Highest elevation: 116 m (381 ft)
- Lowest elevation: 77 m (253 ft)
- Population (2023): 631
  - Density: 35.0/km^{2} (90.7/sq mi)
- Time zone: UTC+01:00 (CET)
  - Summer (DST): UTC+02:00 (CEST)
- INSEE/Postal code: 53082 /53230
- ^{1} French Land Register data, which excludes lakes, ponds, glaciers > 1 km^{2} (0.386 sq mi or 247 acres) and river estuaries.

Courbeveille (French pronunciation: [kuʁbəvɛj]) is a commune in the Mayenne department in north-western France. It is around 12 km south-west of Laval.

== See also ==
- Communes of the Mayenne department
