= Brigitte Girardin =

French diplomat and politician

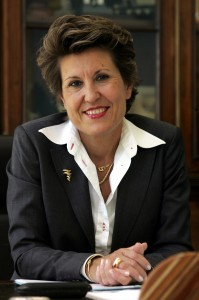

Minister-Delegate for Cooperation, Development and the Francophonie
- In office 2005–2007
- President: Jacques Chirac
- Prime Minister: Dominique de Villepin

Minister of French Overseas
- In office 7 May 2002 – 2 June 2005
- President: Jacques Chirac
- Prime Minister: Jean-Pierre Raffarin
- Preceded by: Jean-Jacques de Peretti
- Succeeded by: François Baroin

Senior Administrator of the French Southern and Antarctic Lands
- In office 25 Mar 1998 – 26 Jan 2000
- President: Jacques Chirac
- Prime Minister: Lionel Jospin
- Preceded by: Pierre Lise
- Succeeded by: Jean-Yves Hermoso

Brigitte Girardin (French pronunciation: [bʁiʒit ʒiʁaʁdɛ̃]; born 12 January 1953 in Verdun, Meuse, France) is a French diplomat and politician. She was the minister of Overseas France under Jacques Chirac from 7 May 2002 to 2 June 2005.

== Biography ==
In 1976, Girardin first worked for the French government at the Ministry of Foreign Affairs. In 1978, she was in charge of economic relations between Francophone nations in Africa.

In early 1998, Girardin was appointed as the Senior Administrator of the French Southern and Antarctic Lands until January 2000.

In 2002, Girardin was appointed as the Minister of Overseas under Prime Minister, Jean-Pierre Raffarin's government. In May 2003, Girardin met with the Spanish Secretary for European Affairs, Ramón de Miguel, and Portuguese Deputy Foreign Minister, Carlos da Costa Neves to demand the European Union add aid for the countries' ultra-peripheral regions to the constitution.

In 2005, Girardin worked as the Minister for Cooperation, Development and the Francophonie, where she made several deals between France and Francophone nations. She visited and signed economic agreements with Cameroon to provide $680 million in debt relief aid, Comoros, granting €88 million, Mauritania, signing financial accords for developmental projects, the Democratic Republic of Congo, Senegal, providing €110 million in aid, and Canada.

Girardin was also a member of UMP, a political party founded by Dominique de Villepin based on his republic of solidarity movement. She was the Secretary General of the party until its closure in 2011.

On 17 April 2012, Girardin announced that she will be voting for French president candidate François Hollande in the first round of the 2012 French presidential election.

In May 2015, Girardin joined the Court of Auditors.
