= Marc Bernier =

French politician

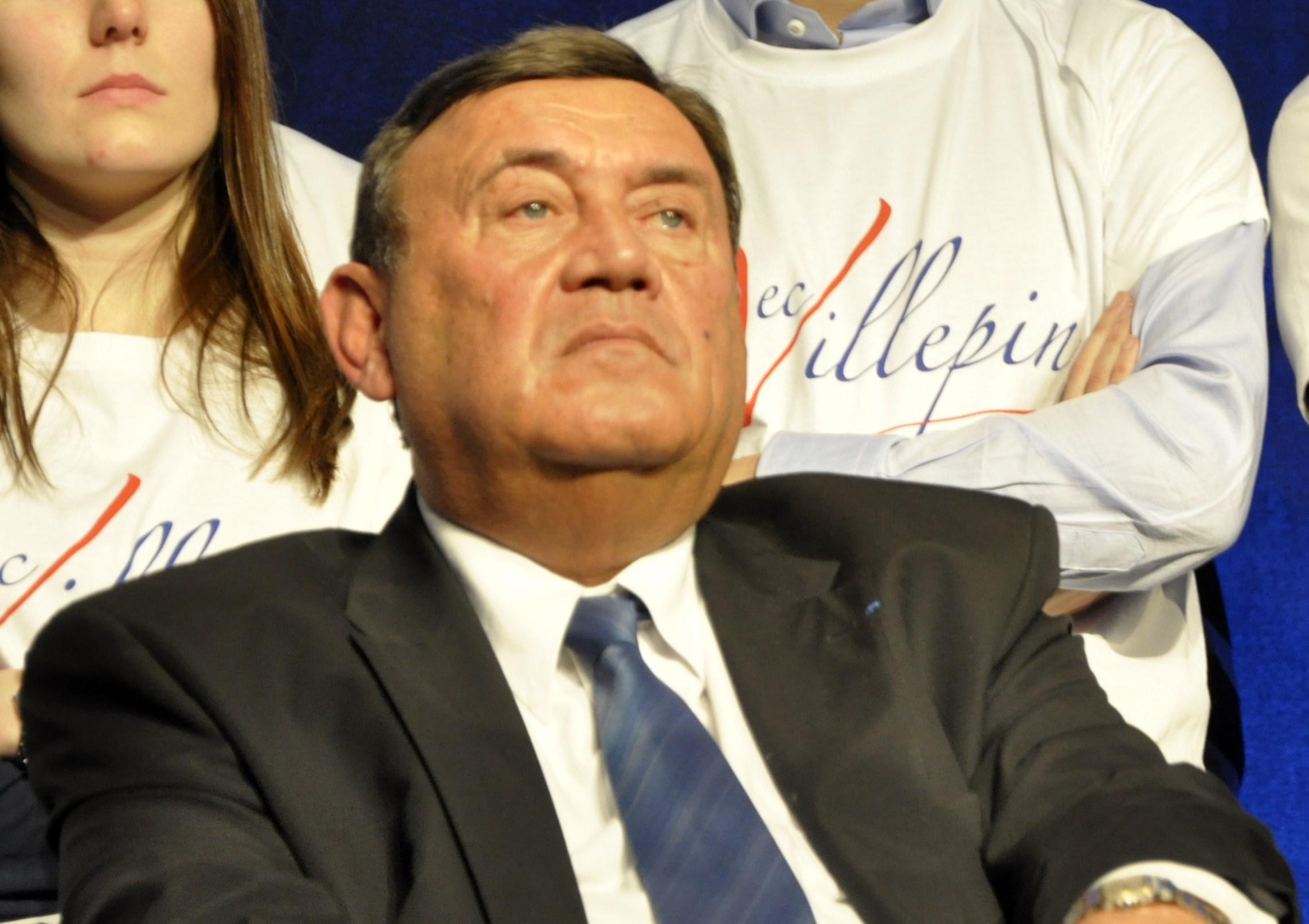

Marc Bernier (born 19 April 1943 in Le Mans) was a member of the 13th National Assembly of France, until 19 June 2012. He represented the Mayenne department, and is a member of the Union for a Popular Movement.

== Biography ==
He worked as a dental surgeon.

He was elected deputy on June 16, 2002, and re-elected on June 17, 2007, for the 13th legislature (2007-2012), in the 2nd district of Mayenne. He did not stand for re-election in the 2012 legislative elections and was succeeded by Guillaume Chevrollier (UMP). Until 2012, Marc Bernier was a member of the UMP group and the National Assembly's study group on the Tibet issue.

An advocate for the reinstatement of the death penalty, in April 2004 he co-signed a bill introduced by Richard Dell'Agnola aimed at “reinstating the death penalty for perpetrators of acts of terrorism.” In 2007, however, he voted in favor of adopting the constitutional bill prohibiting the death penalty.

On March 25, 2010, he announced his support for Dominique de Villepin and his party, République solidaire. In September 2011, he was appointed secretary general of République solidaire.

In January 2016, he announced his retirement from political life during the renewal of the Vaiges municipal council.
