= 2007 French presidential election =

Election of Nicolas Sarkozy

- 22 April 2007 (first round); 6 May 2007 (second round)
- Turnout: 83.77% (first round) ▲12.17 pp 83.97% (second round) ▲4.26 pp
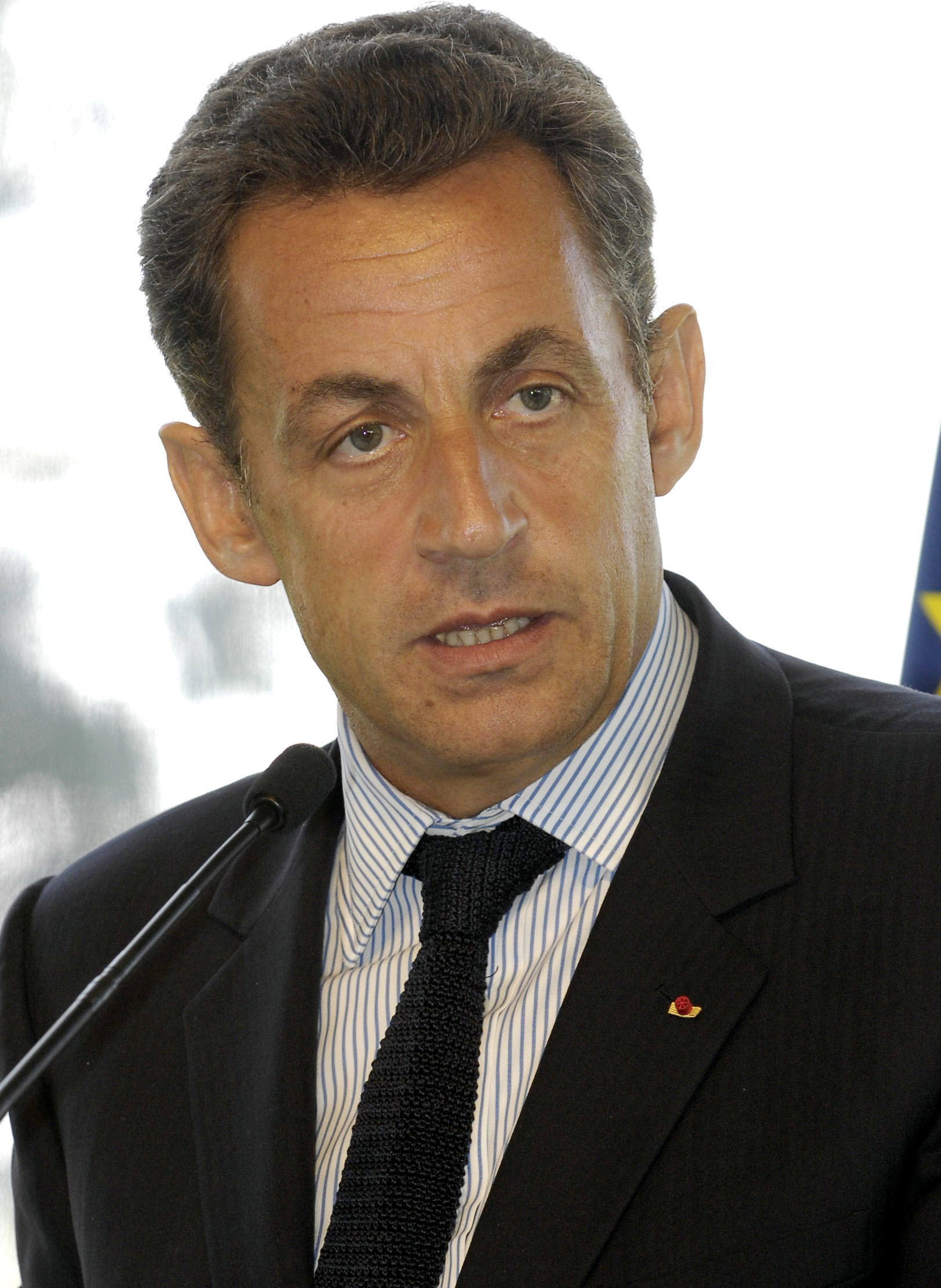

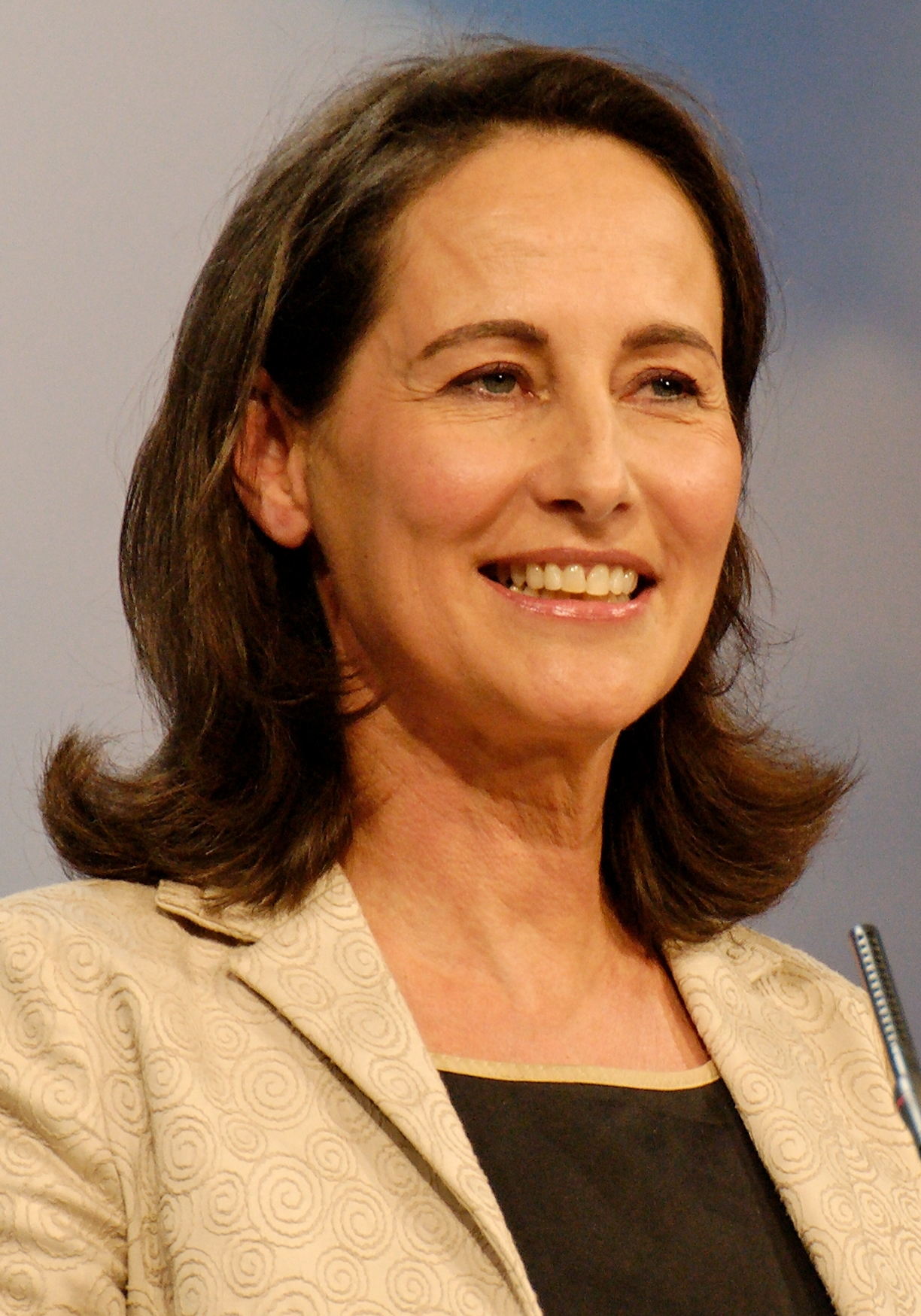
Nominee	Nicolas Sarkozy	Ségolène Royal
Party	UMP	PS
Popular vote	18,983,138	16,790,440
Percentage	53.06%	46.94%
President before election
Jacques Chirac
UMP
Elected President
Nicolas Sarkozy
UMP

Presidential elections were held in France on 21 and 22 April 2007 to elect the successor to Jacques Chirac as president of France (and ex officio Co-Prince of Andorra) for a five-year term. As no candidate received a majority of the vote, a second round was held on 5 and 6 May 2007 between the two leading candidates, Nicolas Sarkozy and Ségolène Royal. Sarkozy was elected with 53% of the vote.

Sarkozy and Royal both represented a generational change. Both main candidates were born after World War II, along with the first to have seen adulthood under the Fifth Republic, and the first not to have been in politics under Charles de Gaulle. In addition, Royal was the first woman in France's history to reach the second round in a presidential election.

The election result has been interpreted as an example of center squeeze, a kind of spoiler effect common to the plurality-rule family of voting rules, since Sarkozy, a conservative, and Royal, a socialist, eliminated moderate liberal François Bayrou in the first round, despite polls showing a majority of voters preferred Bayrou in a one-on-one match with either of his opponents.

Sarkozy ran for re-election in 2012, but was defeated by Royal's lifelong partner at the time, François Hollande. Since the death of Lionel Jospin in 2026, it is the earliest French presidential election in which either of the second round candidates is still alive.

== Schedule ==
- 22 February 2007: The decree convoking the election was published in the Journal officiel de la République française.
- 16 March 2007 – 18:00 (16:00 UTC): Deadline for candidates to have obtained the 500 sponsors from elected officials in at least 30 different departments or overseas territories which are required to run for president.
- 19 March 2007 – 17:30 (15:30 UTC): Official candidate list was announced by the Constitutional Council: 12 candidates.
- 9 April 2007: Official campaign started.
- 20 April 2007: Official campaign ended.
- 21 April 2007: First round of voting started in Saint Pierre and Miquelon at 8 am local time (10:00 UTC) and subsequently took place in Guadeloupe, Martinique, French Guiana, French Polynesia, and in voting offices in embassies and consulates in the Americas.
- 22 April 2007: First round of voting took place in Wallis and Futuna, New Caledonia, Réunion, Mayotte, Metropolitan France, and in voting offices in embassies and consulates in Oceania, Asia, Africa and Europe – the last polling stations closed in the large cities of Metropolitan France at 8 pm local time (18:00 UTC) and publication of the first exit polls were allowed immediately after they closed.
- 25 April 2007: Official results of the first round announced.
- 27 April 2007: Official candidate list for second round announced.
- 2 May 2007 – 21:00 (19:00 UTC): Nationally televised debate between the two candidates.
- 5 May 2007: Second round of voting started in Saint Pierre and Miquelon at 8 am local time (10:00 UTC) and subsequently took place in Guadeloupe, Martinique, French Guiana, French Polynesia, and in voting offices in embassies and consulates in the Americas.
- 6 May 2007: Second round of voting took place in Wallis and Futuna, New Caledonia, Réunion, Mayotte, Metropolitan France, and in voting offices in embassies and consulates in Oceania, Asia, Africa and Europe – the last polling stations closed in the large cities of Metropolitan France at 8 pm local time (18:00 UTC) and publication of the first exit polls were allowed immediately after they closed.
- 10 May 2007: Official results of the second round announced.
- 16 May 2007 – Midnight (22:00 UTC): Expiration of the term of president Jacques Chirac.

== Electoral system ==
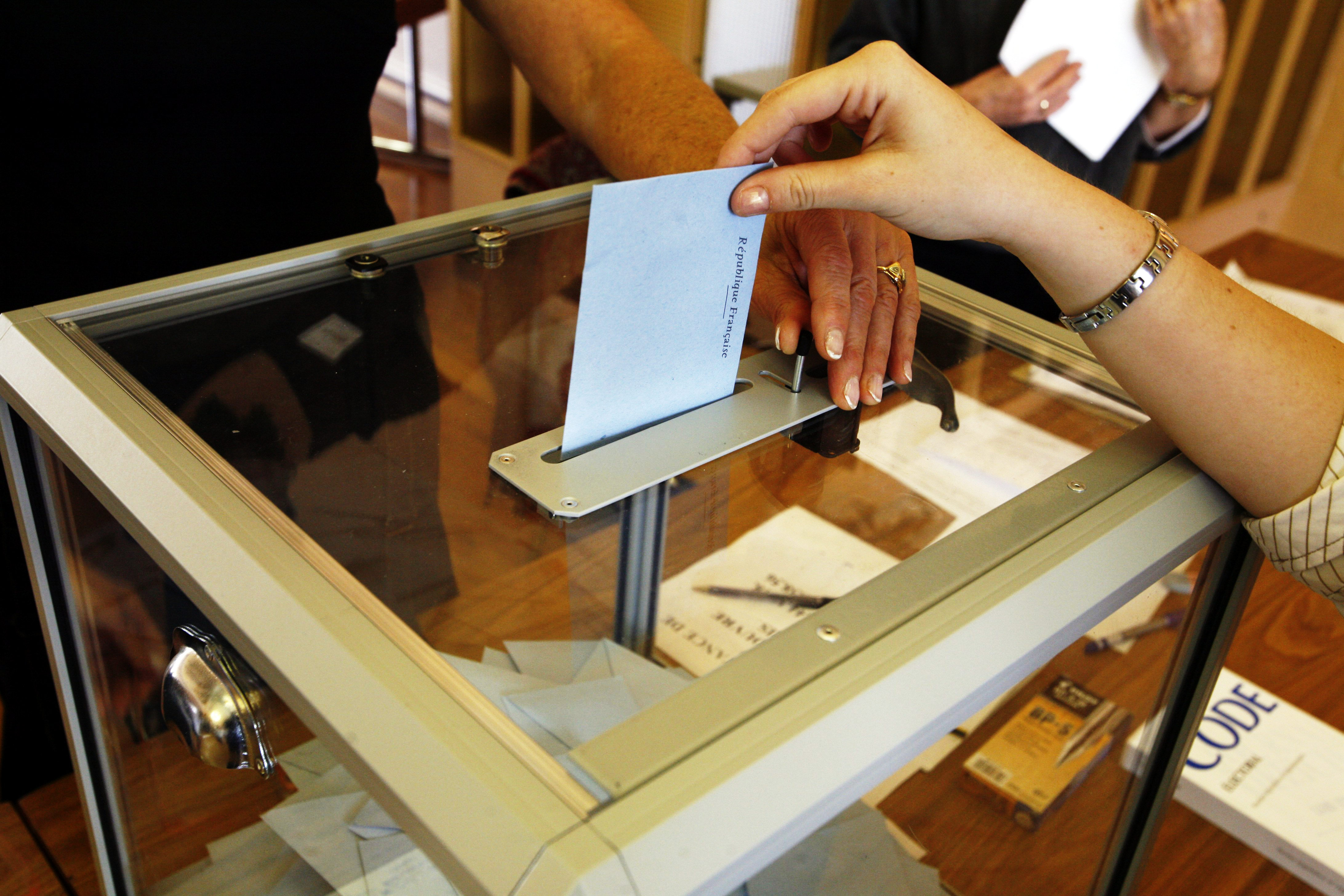
Transparent ballot boxes have been required since 1988.

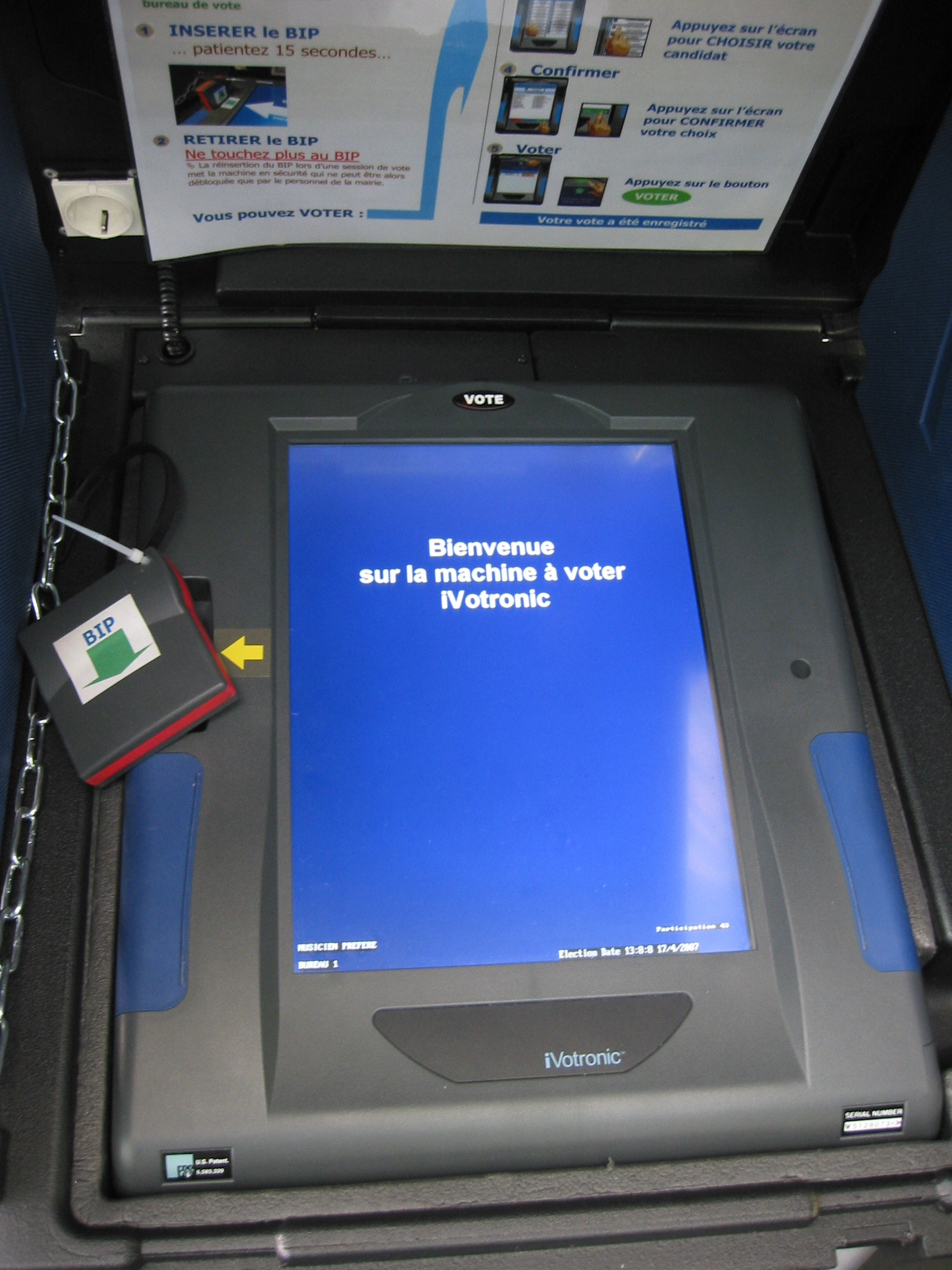
Some French cities used voting machines.

For the first time in a presidential election, electronic voting was introduced in some areas, having been authorised in 2004. They were introduced in only 82 of 36,000 voting districts, and were criticised by a number of people, both on the left and on the right. A petition against them has also been made (see Wikinews:Electronic voting disputed in France).

Using the three colours of the national flag (blue, white, and red) on electoral advertisements or partisan documentation was prohibited by electoral regulations. Ségolène Royal contended that the book Ensemble ("together") published by Nicolas Sarkozy, whose cover is blue, white and red, was effectively an electoral partisan documentation and should have been covered by this prohibition.

== Candidates ==
=== Requirements ===
Reference: Constitutional Council, FAQ

The requirements for being successfully nominated as a candidate are defined by the organic law of 6 November 1962.

All candidates had to be of French nationality and at least 23 years old (the same requirement as for the candidates to the National Assembly).

Candidates must obtain signatures from 500 elected officials (mayors, members of Parliament, elected representatives) supporting their candidacy. These signatures from elected officials (informally known in French as parrainages, but legally known as "presentations") must be from at least 30 departments or overseas territories, and no more than 10 percent can be from any individual department. A presentation from an elected official does not imply the official supports the policies of the candidate, but rather that this official considers the candidate to be a serious candidate.

Candidates must also submit a statement with details of their personal assets.

The Constitutional Council published the official candidate list on 20 March 2007. The candidates were listed in a randomised order. This order was used for the official campaign: thus, posters for Olivier Besancenot were to always be displayed on the No. 1 board, those for Marie-George Buffet on the No. 2 board, etc., regardless of where in France the boards were located.

There were 12 candidates for the 2007 election.

=== Leading candidates ===
Four candidates consistently registered over 10% in the opinion polls and were regarded as having a reasonable chance of reaching the second round.

- Nicolas Sarkozy was nominated by the Union for a Popular Movement on 14 January 2007. He was the leader of the UMP and was Interior Minister until stepping down to focus on his campaign on 26 March 2007.
- Ségolène Royal was selected by the Socialist Party on 17 November 2006 to be the party's candidate for the election. She won 60.6% of the votes in a ballot of party members to choose their candidate, against 20.8% for Dominique Strauss-Kahn and 18.5% for Laurent Fabius. She was the first woman to represent a major French party in a presidential contest.
- François Bayrou was nominated by the centrist Union for French Democracy (UDF) on 2 December 2006.
- Jean-Marie Le Pen ran for the National Front, a far-right party which promotes policies of strong law enforcement, economic protectionism and strong measures to control immigration. As during previous presidential campaigns, Le Pen raised the question of whether he would be able to obtain the necessary 500 signatures on a number of occasions, which he claims is the result of pressure placed on elected officials by the major parties to support their own candidate (he has often claimed, during past elections, that "political elites" have sabotaged his campaigns); however, on 14 March 2007 his party said that he had obtained the necessary signatures.
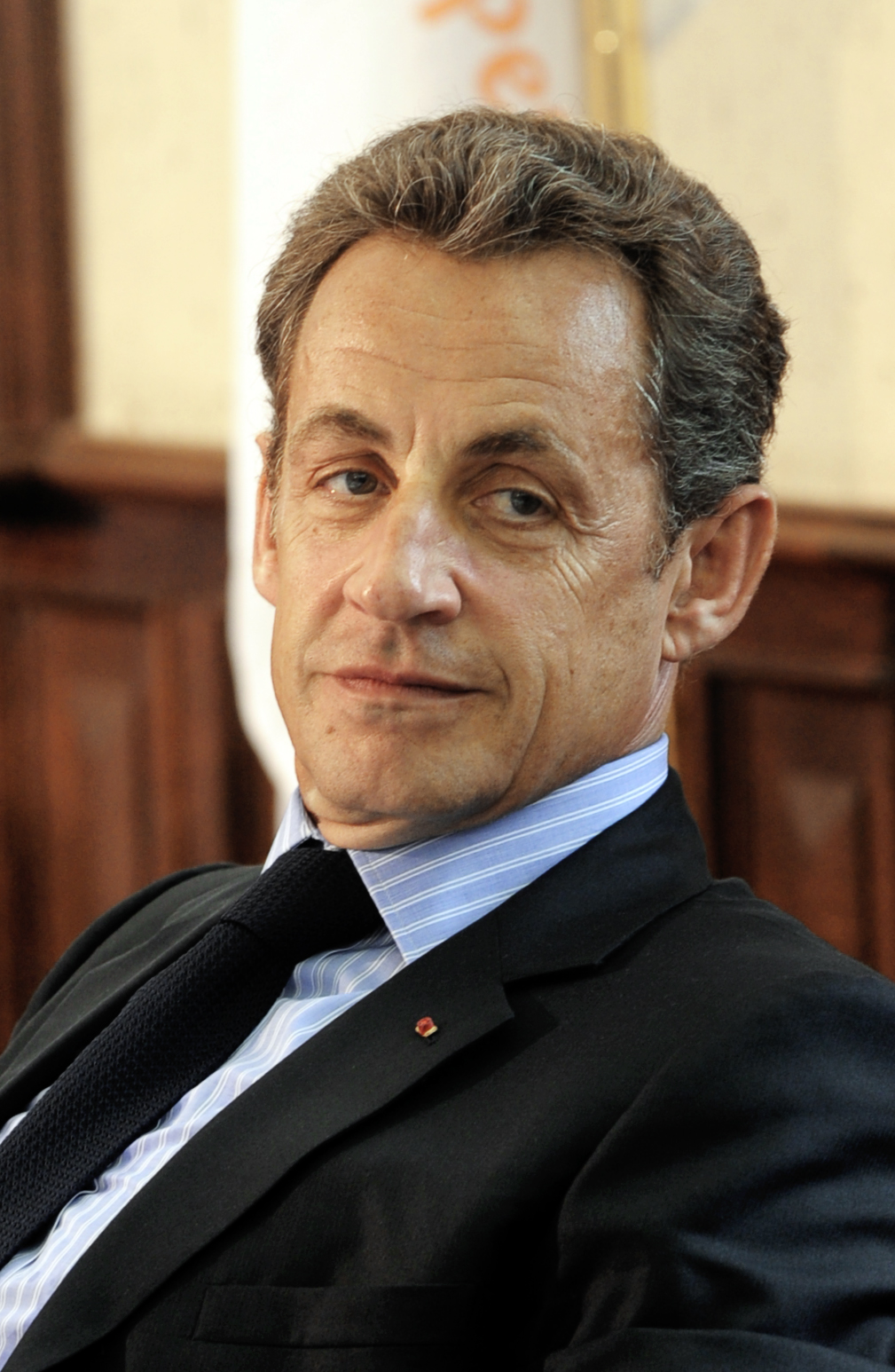
Nicolas Sarkozy candidate of the Union for a Popular Movement

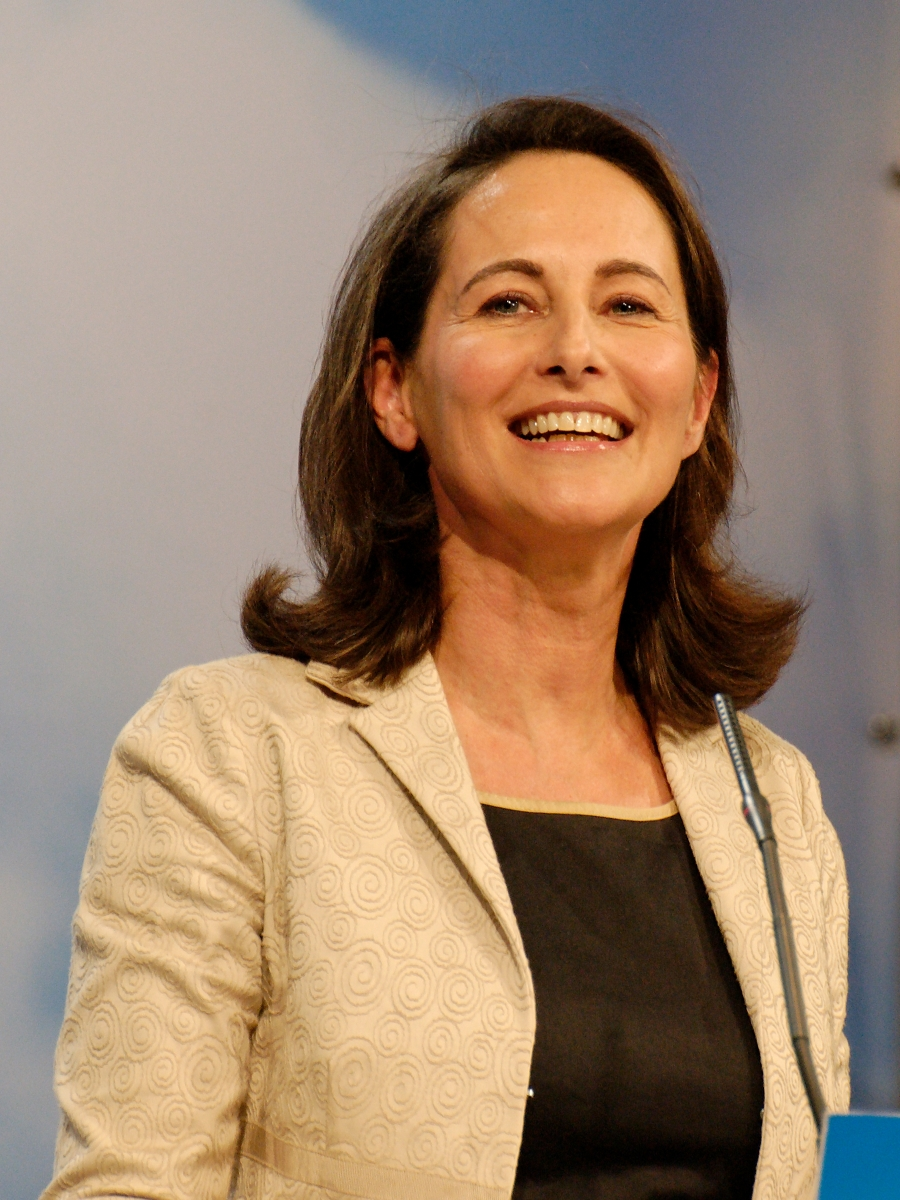
Ségolène Royal candidate of the Socialist Party

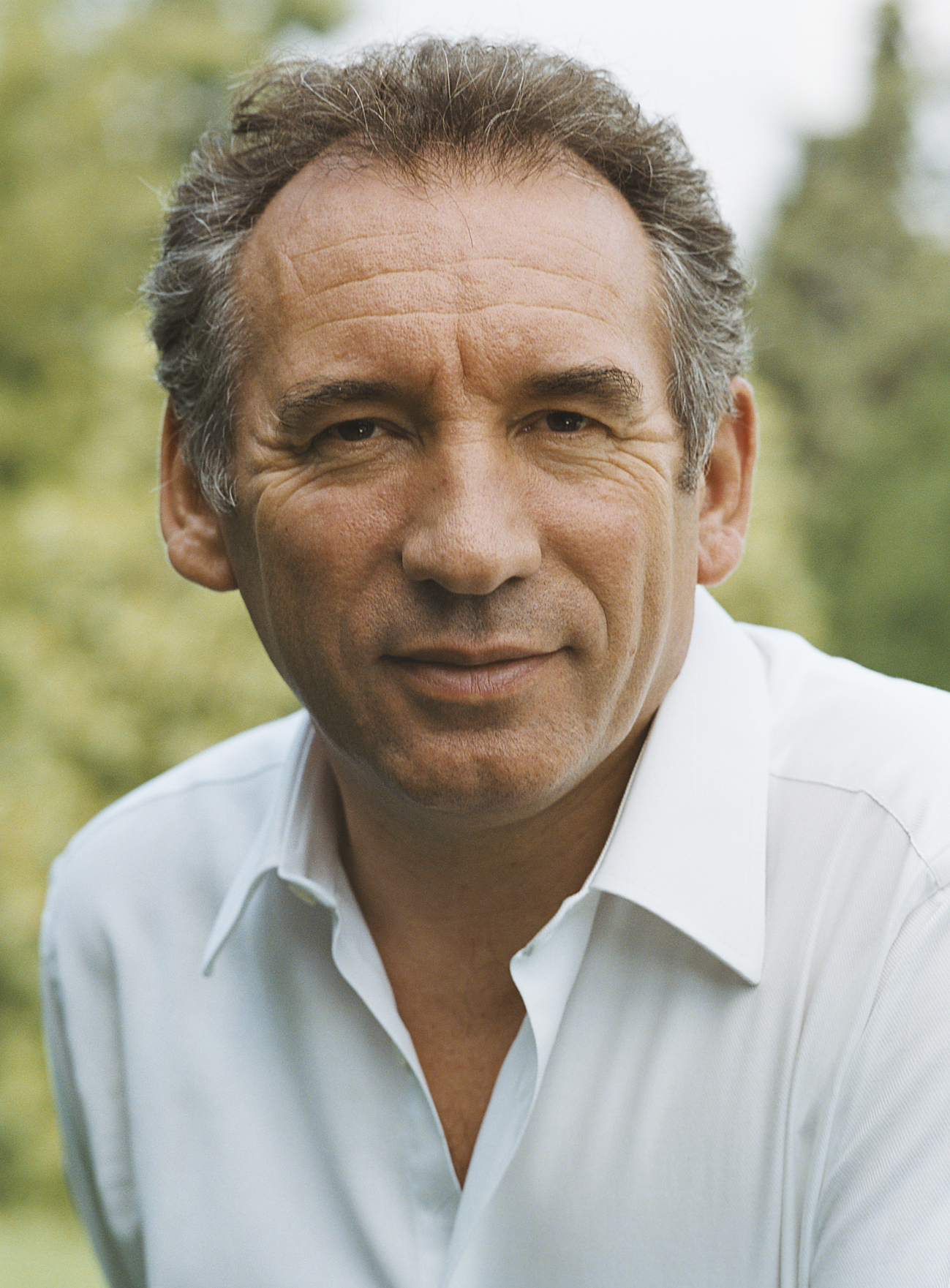
François Bayrou candidate of the Union for French Democracy

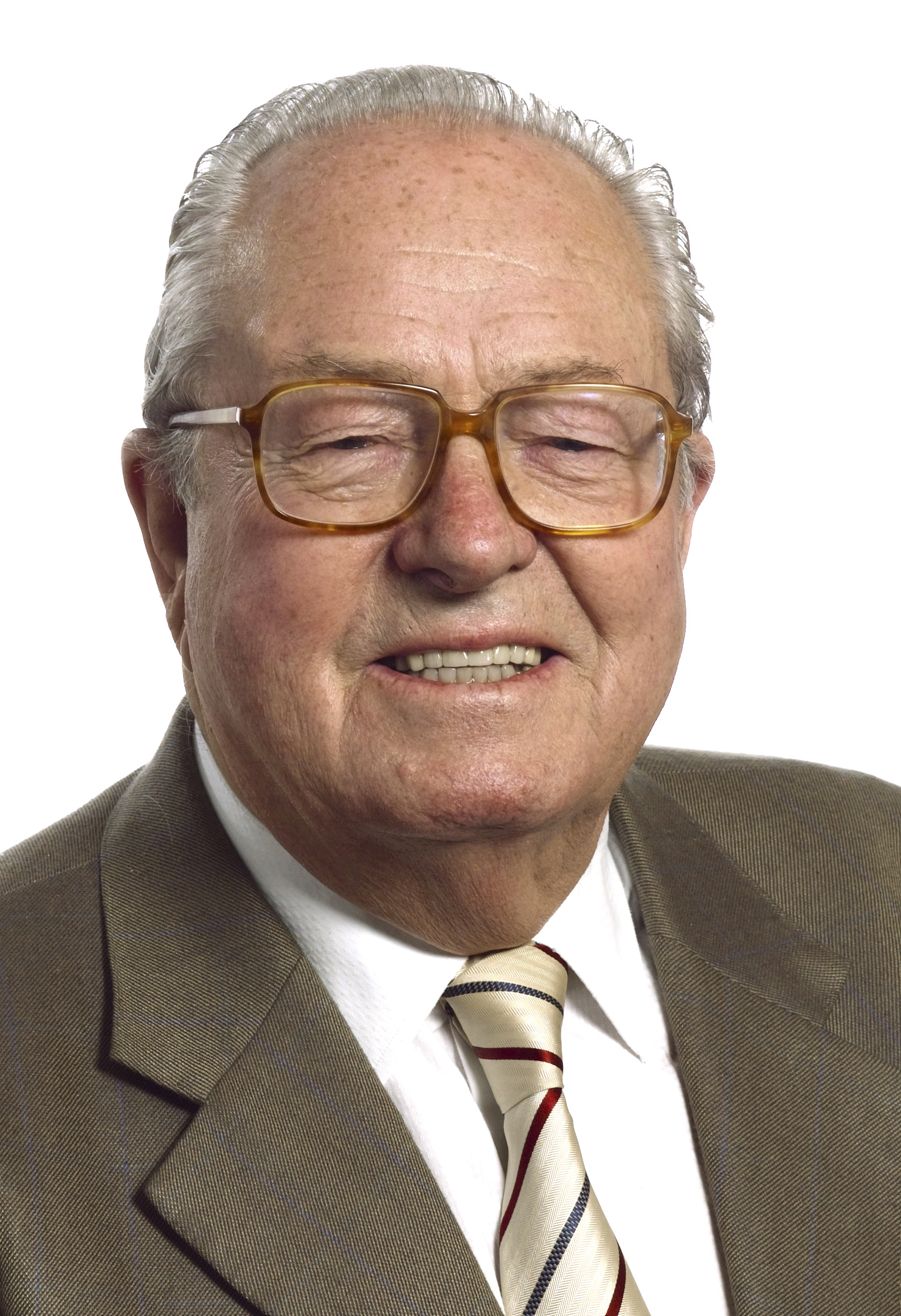
Jean-Marie Le Pen candidate of the National Front

=== Other candidates ===
These were the eight other candidates who obtained the required 500 signatures from elected officials to endorse their candidacy.

- Olivier Besancenot: Revolutionary Communist League
- José Bové: Leftist environmentalist who ran on an alter-globalisation platform
- Marie-George Buffet: Communist Party
- Arlette Laguiller: Workers' Struggle
- Frédéric Nihous: Hunting, Fishing, Nature, Tradition Party
- Gérard Schivardi: styled himself as "the mayors' candidate", supported by the Workers' Party
- Philippe de Villiers: president of the Movement for France party ran on a traditionalist Catholic and eurosceptic platform, and with a firm anti-Islamic message.
- Dominique Voynet: Green Party.
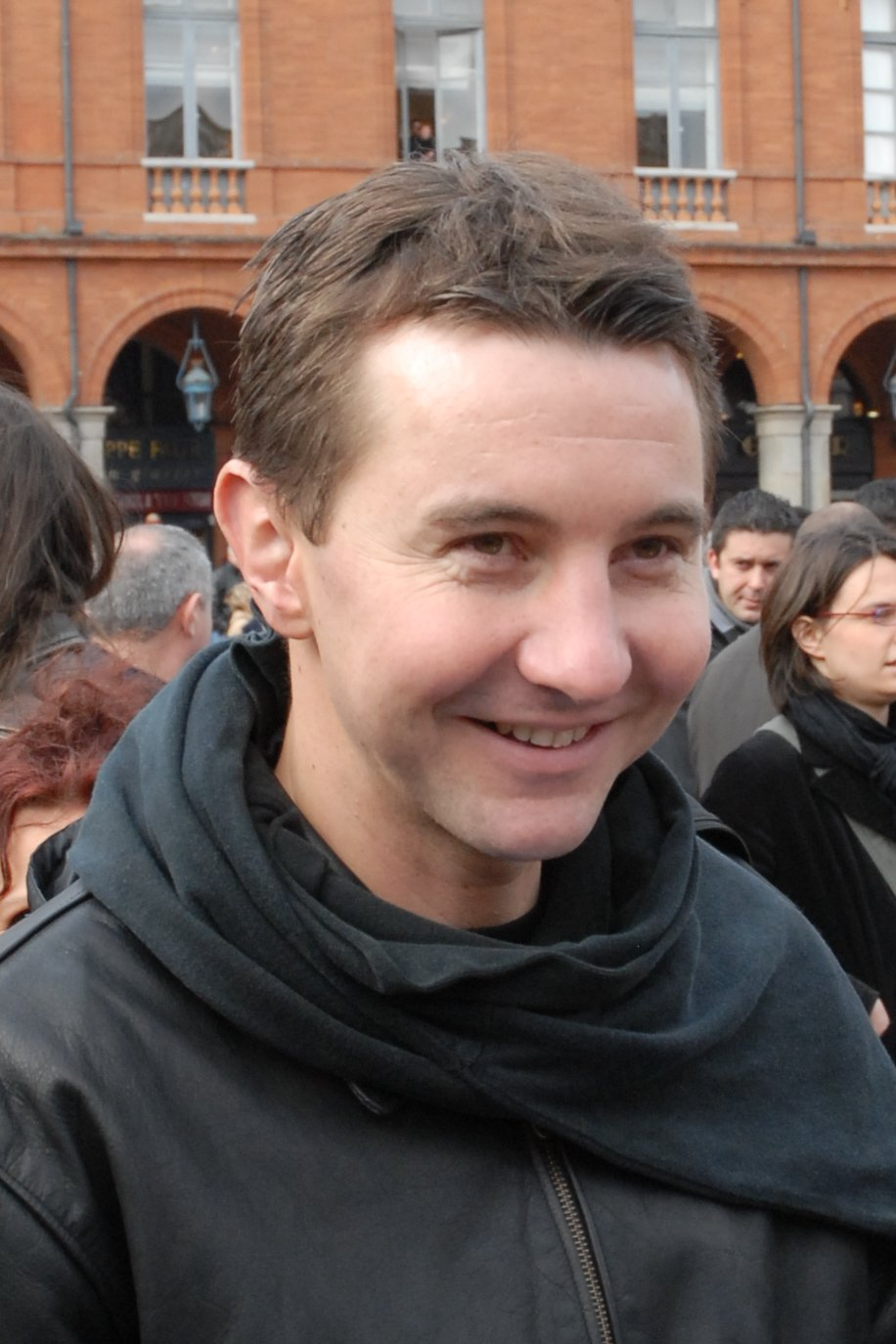
Olivier Besancenot

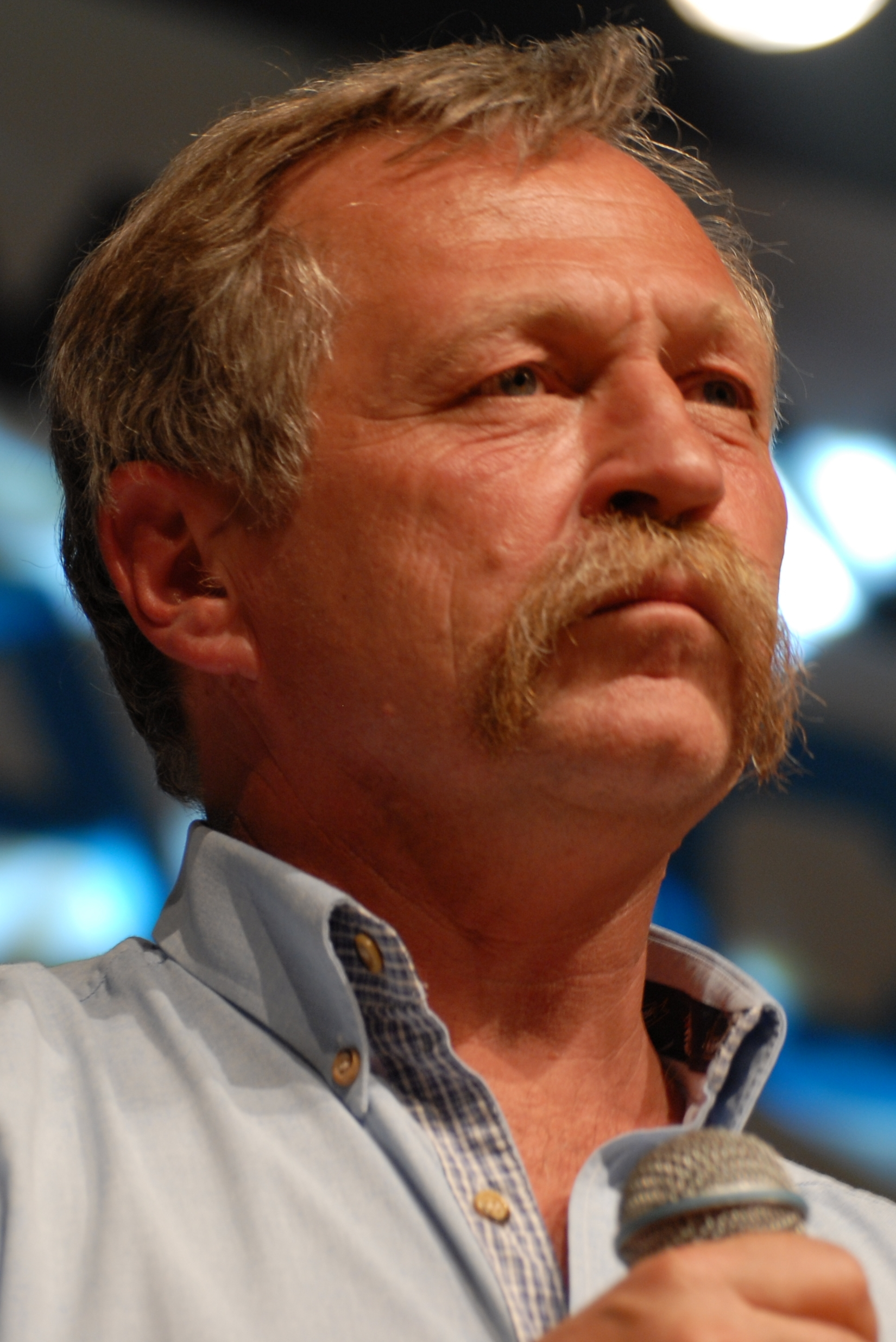
José Bové

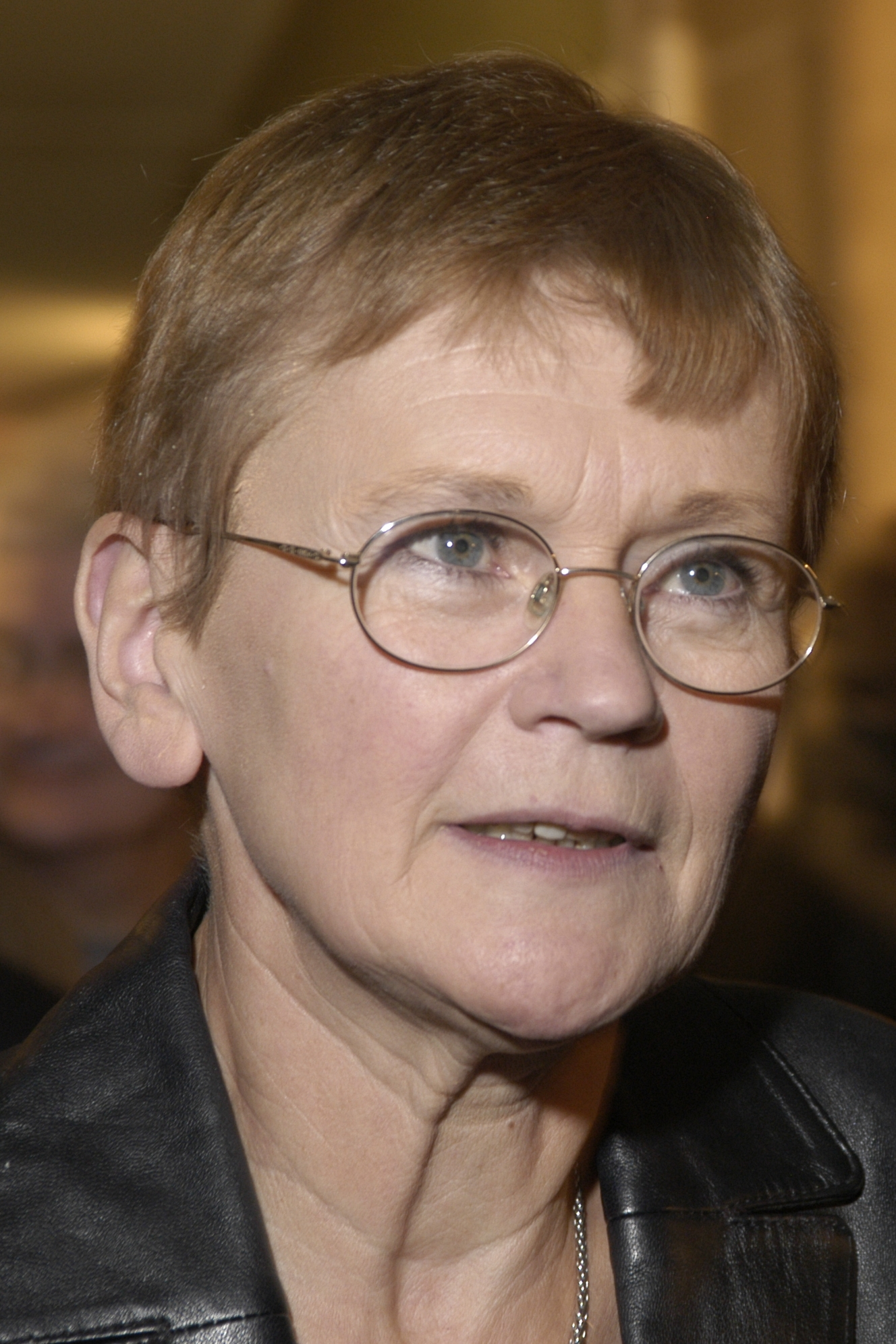
Marie-George Buffet

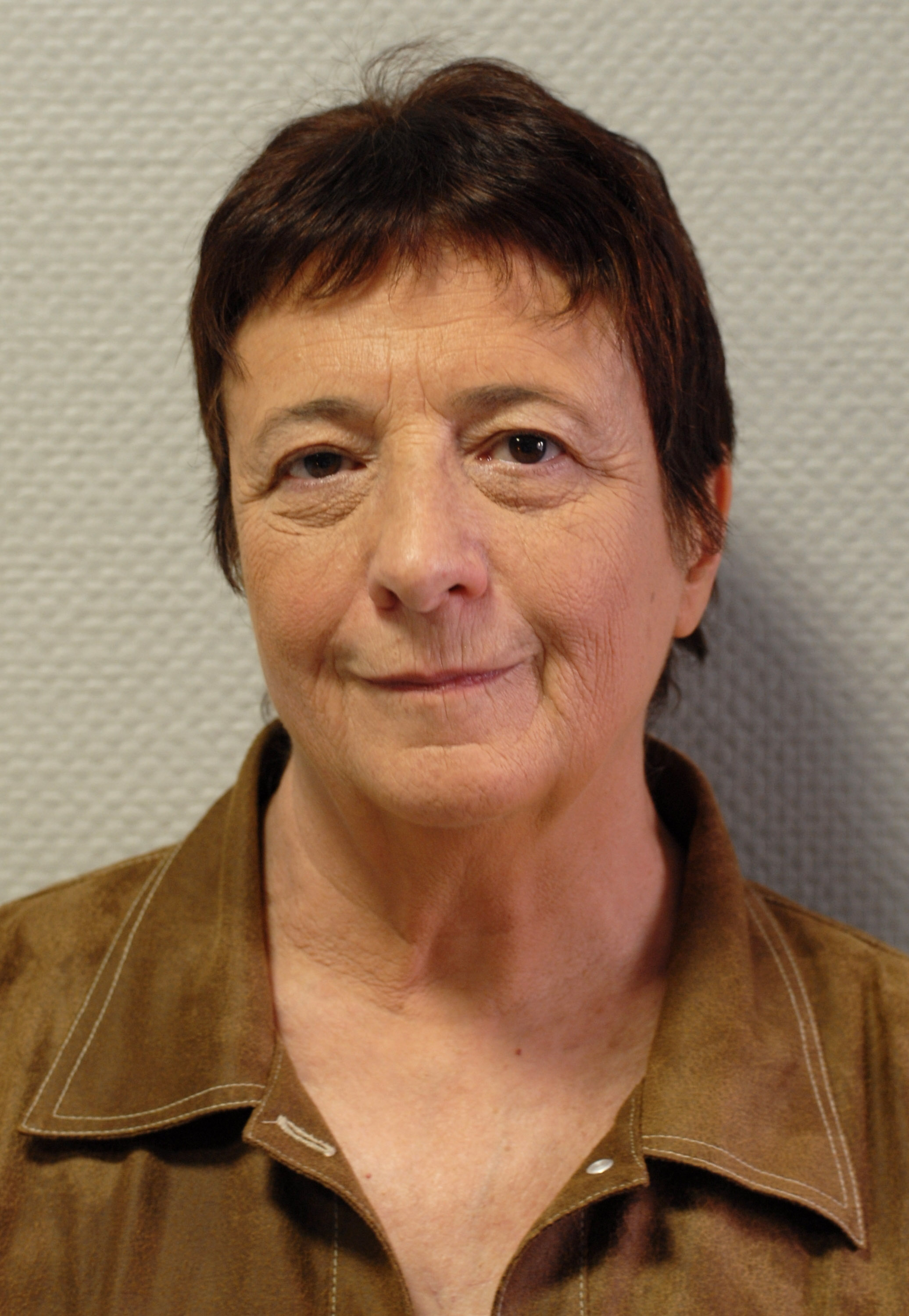
Arlette Laguiller

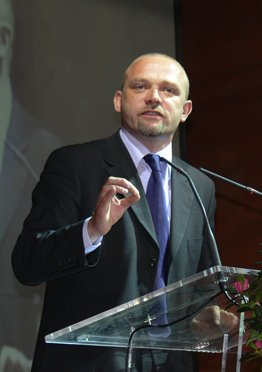
Frédéric Nihous

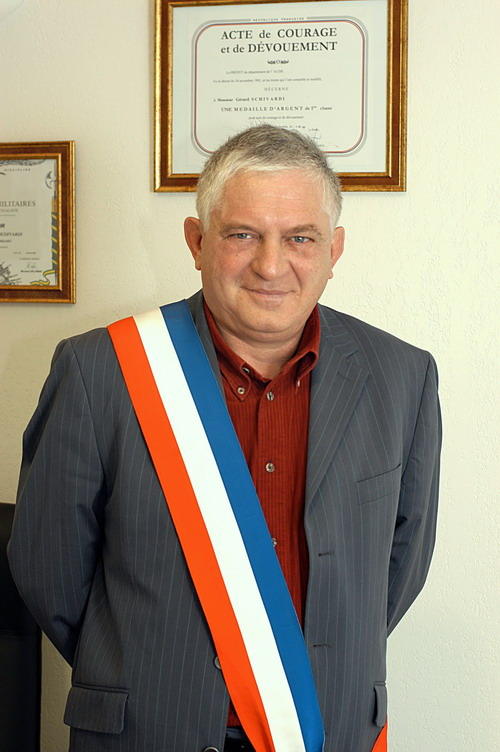
Gérard Schivardi

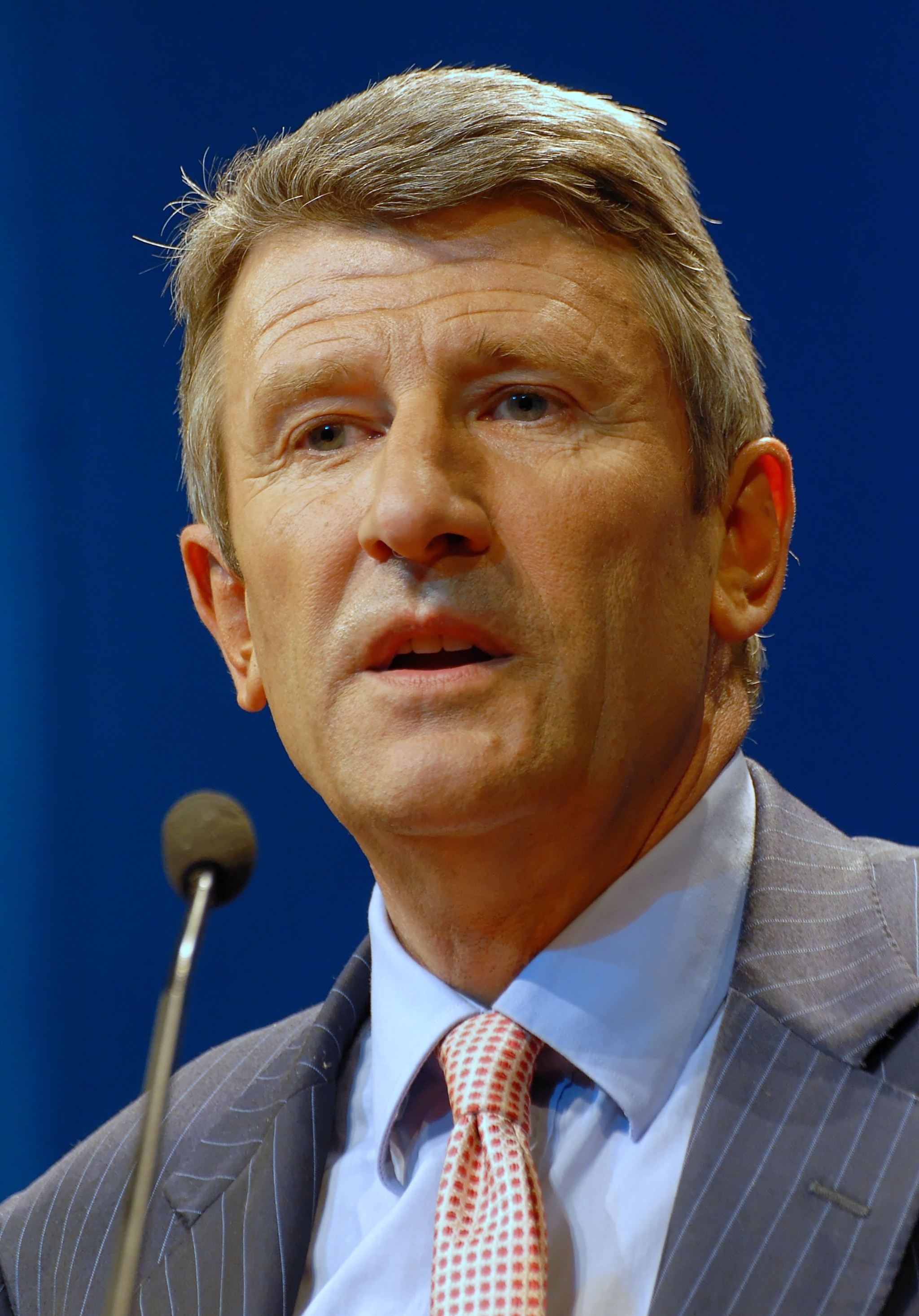
Philippe de Villiers

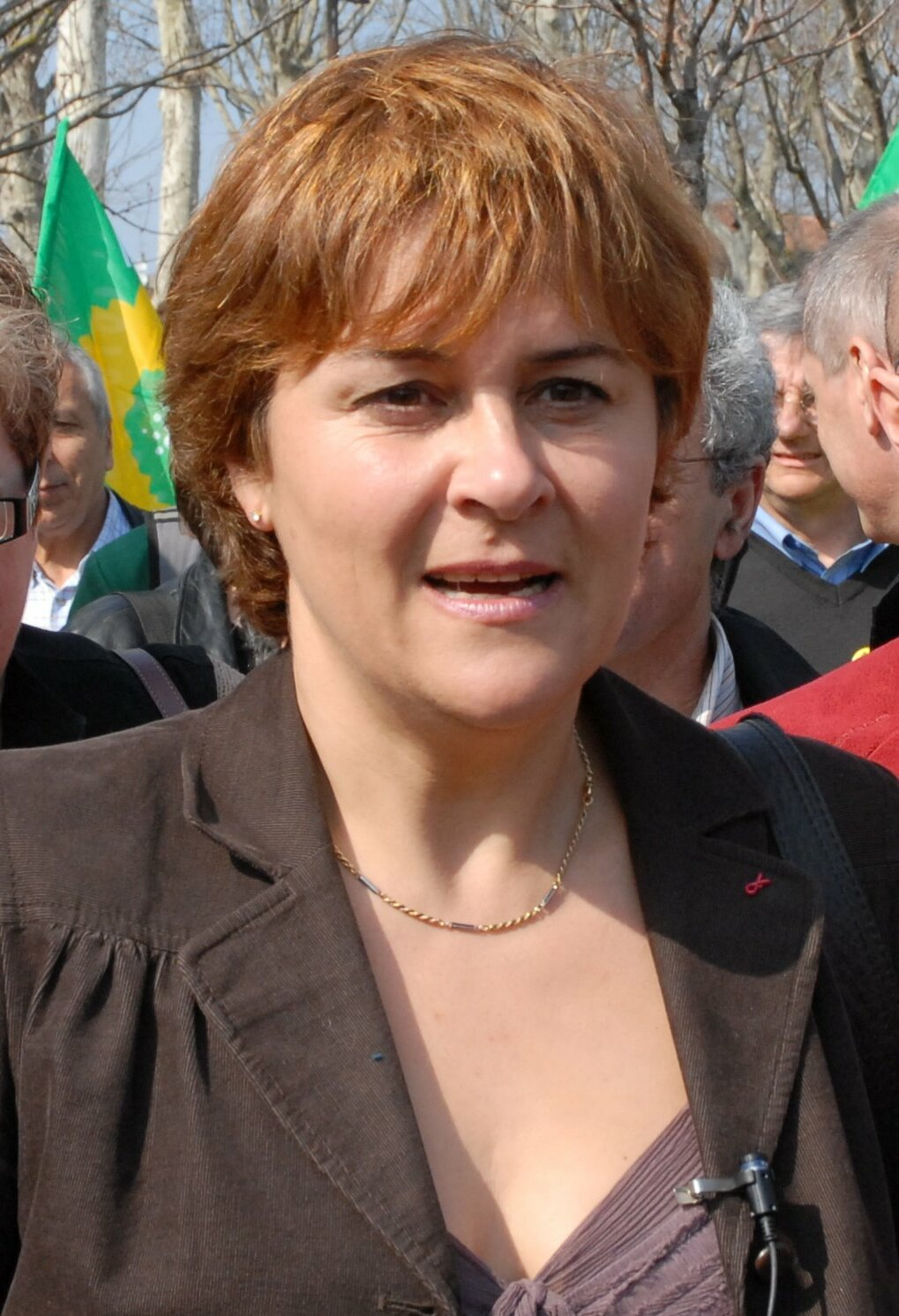
Dominique Voynet

=== Confirmed non-candidates ===
- President Jacques Chirac announced on 11 March 2007 that he would not be standing for another term as president. It had been rumoured that President Chirac was considering running for a third term, following statements he made at the beginning of 2007, including his New Year's Address on 31 December 2006, and subsequent speeches which contained robust comments on international policy and detailed national policy proposals with a suggested five-year timetable. In March, Chirac announced his support for Sarkozy. There was no provision at the time in the Constitution of 1958 specifying a limited number of terms, though a third term would have been unprecedented under the Fifth Republic.
- Christine Boutin announced that she would not be a candidate for the election and pledged her support for Nicolas Sarkozy (source: France 2 news, 2 December 2006).
- Rachid Kaci, member of the UMP and President of the group Free Right (la Droite Libre), announced his withdrawal as candidate and also pledged to support Nicolas Sarkozy on 21 December 2006 during a UMP public Forum.
- MRC chairman Jean-Pierre Chevènement announced on 10 December 2006 that he would not be running, and that his movement would back Ségolène Royal in return for an electoral agreement in the 2007 general election.
- Candidate for the Radical Party, Christiane Taubira in the 2002 election, confirmed that she would not be running following an electoral agreement between her party and the Socialist Party. The Left Radicals in return supported Ségolène Royal.
- Nicolas Hulot, television presenter and environmental activist, was widely considered to be a possible candidate following the positive media and public reaction to his recent book and Environmental Charter. On 3 January 2007 Le Figaro newspaper reported that supporters of Hulot had begun gathering signatures to mount a campaign and a website, was created to generate support. On 22 January he announced that he would not be a candidate.
- Corinne Lepage, environmentalist politician and activist, withdrew her candidacy in favour of Bayrou on 10 March 2007.
- Roland Castro, architect and "utopian left" activist, withdrew his candidacy on 12 March 2007.
- Édouard Fillias: Alternative Libérale, a new French libertarian party, withdrew his candidacy on 13 March 2007 in favour of Bayrou.
- Antoine Waechter: Independent Ecological Movement, withdrew his candidacy on 14 March 2007

=== Did not get enough endorsements ===
- Yves-Marie Adeline
- Yves Aubry
- Soheib Bencheikh
- Jacques Cheminade
- Nicolas Dupont-Aignan: former member of Union for a Popular Movement, announced on RTL radio on 10 January 2007 that he had obtained approximately 310 promises for signatures to validate his candidacy and intended to stand on a 'sovereigntist' platform, against further European integration through the EU.
- France Gamerre: Génération Écologie
- Nicolas Miguet : right-wing businessman, press publisher and tax protester, he was accused of running a scam in order to obtain the 500 endorsements. He was arrested and freed on bail. Announced that he would support François Bayrou.
- Rachid Nekkaz

== Campaign ==
The election campaign raised a number of issues:

- Jobs and unemployment – France long had an unemployment rate officially close to 10%, down to below 9% in 2007. Employment, and employment conditions, are a perennial concern for the French (see Economy of France and Poverty in France).
- European disunity – The presidential election followed the EU Constitution rejection vote in 2005, which threw into question the future direction of the European Union.
- International politics – A majority in France approved of President Jacques Chirac's opposition to the 2003 invasion of Iraq by the United States. Sarkozy was considered as pro-Washington, while Royal, although seen as probably also in line with Washington, is thought to be more moderate. Left-wing intellectual Régis Debray's metaphor was that Sarkozy was like a direct flight to Washington, D.C., while Royal was a flight to Washington with a stop-off in Oslo, referring to her European inclinations. Chirac's public opposition to the Iraq War should however be relativised, as he toned down his criticisms after a while. Furthermore, he involved French troops in Afghanistan and agreed, immediately after the 11 September 2001 attacks, on increased cooperation between Western intelligence services, materialised by the creation of Alliance Base in the centre of Paris, a joint international Counterterrorist Intelligence Centre.
- Law and order – During the 2002 campaign, law and order came to the forefront, especially with respect to unruly youths from poor suburbs. In late 2005, in some of these suburbs significant unrest erupted. Again, law and order was a forefront issue, mainstream candidates tackled the problem of reining in unruly youngsters. Sarkozy proposed measures for harsher criminal procedure for youngsters, while Royal proposed to send unruly youths to centres under military discipline. Sarkozy's attitude was widely criticised on the left, and also by the UMP minister Azouz Begag, who defected his party to support Bayrou following Sarkozy's management of the autumn 2005 crisis.
- Immigration – The issue of immigration in France split France. The number of deportations more than doubled since 2002, with Sarkozy as Minister of the Interior from 2002 to 2004 and 2005 to 2007. Sarkozy declared in April 2006 that immigrants who did not "like France" should "leave it." Opponents have labelled Sarkozy's attitude as repressive, in particular towards illegal immigrants, materialised by numerous police raids against illegal aliens, strongly opposed by the left. The main problem concerns illegal immigrants (sans-papiers, "without documents") who cannot obtain work permits without proper immigration documents and are therefore mostly found in the informal economy – construction, restaurants, etc. Although the right of foreigners to vote was a classic claim of the left-wing, it was not an important issue of the campaign. On the other hand, Sarkozy declared himself in favour of affirmative action which was widely contested both on the left and on the right, on grounds that it would favour communautarisme – separation of communities – along ethnic lines, and that it means taking into account ethnic alleged memberships in statistics, which is legally prohibited and not done by the INSEE. Left-wingers argued in favour of social actions not based on ethnic factors, but on geographical situation and equality of territory; however, the traditional Universalism of the French republicans has also been criticised on the left-wing by some intellectuals supporting a middle-ground between Republican universalism and multiculturalism.
- The Far Right – The National Front, long dismissed as a fringe party, stunned many when its leader, Jean-Marie Le Pen, reached the second round of the 2002 elections. Le Pen's points of focus – law and order and immigration – were later taken up by politicians such as Sarkozy. Le Pen on 12 April 2007 criticised Sarkozy for being Hungarian and asked if he should run for the president of Hungary. Le Pen was 79 years old, the same age which Charles de Gaulle was when he stepped down from the presidency in 1969. Le Pen's approval rating in opinion polls markedly increased after France's riots in 2005. As a counterweight, the Left and the cultural elite and athletes (like Lilian Thuram) rose to oppose Sarkozy's response to the riots.
- Anti-neoliberalism and Disarray of left-wing parties – During the 2002 presidential election, a number of left-wing candidates ran for office, which, according to commentators, was one reason for the defeat of Socialist candidate Lionel Jospin. Jospin blamed in particular Jean-Pierre Chevènement's candidacy, as well as Christiane Taubira's one. However, others commentators have criticised Jospin's attitude and the policies of the PS, which account, according to them, for the low score of Jospin. Inheritor of the French Section of the Workers' International (SFIO), the PS is historically social-democrat, while the French Communist Party (PCF) is a governmental party, which participated in Jospin's Gauche plurielle (Plural Lefts) government (with ministers such as Jean-Claude Gayssot, etc.). In this sense, the PCF does not consider itself a far-left party, to the contrary of the Revolutionary Communist League (LCR) or Workers' Struggle (LO). But the PCF does consider itself part of the "anti-liberal" coalition, which opposed the Treaty establishing a Constitution for Europe (TCE). Inside the French Socialist Party (PS, Parti socialiste) itself, Laurent Fabius headed the minority who opposed the treaty. However, the victory of the "No" during the May 2005 referendum on the TCE hasn't been exploited yet by the left parties or organisations which supported it. The main topic of the non-PS left-wings was to try to choose a single candidate for the "anti-liberal" Left, which opposes neo-liberalism. This eventually failed, and the far-left was represented by four competing candidates, Marie-George Buffet, Olivier Besancenot, José Bové and Arlette Laguiller. "
- High-level political scandals and disrepute – A number of scandals tainted various French politicians, including president Jacques Chirac (see Corruption scandals in the Paris region), with some, such as former prime minister Alain Juppé, being convicted. The recent Clearstream affair had been exposed as a case of forgery and denunciations involved such major politicians from the ruling UMP coalition.
- Feminism – France's first woman president had the opportunity to be elected in 2007 – Ségolène Royal, a Socialist, ran following her selection on 16 November 2006 as the candidate for the Socialist Party.
- Environment – The environmental party, the Greens, had been low in the polls, but Nicolas Hulot, a presenter of an environmentally themed television show, became very popular and had considered running. Many parties, from the left to the right, were interested in his support.
- Labour – Both Royal and Sarkozy called for "labour" to be respected as a value, although the meaning of this was somewhat open to very different interpretations.
- Housing and homelessness. Following political actions by the Enfants de Don Quichotte NGO, who set up tents for homeless people by the Canal Saint-Martin in Paris and elsewhere, in December 2006, the problem of homelessness was at the centre of the campaign for a period of time. The death of veteran campaigner Abbé Pierre a short time afterward increased the focus on the issue.
- Religion and communautarisme. Sarkozy has opposed both the left-wing and Chirac on the issue of religions, adopting a stance critical of state secularism and of the 1905 law on Separation of the State and the Church. His creation of the French Council of the Muslim Faith (CFCM) was strongly criticised as giving an official voice to the more radical sectors of organised Islam.
- Bayrou's candidacy. François Bayrou, leader of the Union for French Democracy (UDF) centre-right party, decided to present himself as a centrist candidate. He opposed in particular the Union for a Popular Movement (UMP) party led by Sarkozy. Critics have pointed-out that Bayrou and his party had voted along with the UMP parliamentary majority on nearly all cases. Bayrou's trend is generally considered to be the inheritor of the Christian-Democrat MRP.
- Candidate Gérard Schivardi was banned from calling himself le candidat des maires ("the candidate of the mayors"). The 2 April 2007 judicial injunction was requested by the Association of French Mayors, who feared that the candidate might be perceived as officially endorsed by the country's mayors. As a result, he was unable to use the 25 million electoral flyers already printed, which he claims will cost his campaign €300,000. Thus he styled himself as "the candidates of mayors" or "candidate of some mayors" ("de maires" rather than "des maires" – see United Nations Security Council Resolution 242#Semantic dispute for an analogy of this difference between de and des).
- François Bayrou proposed the idea of organising a "debate over the Internet" between the four leading candidates, in order to circumvent the obligation of TV and radio channels to provide equal times to all twelve candidates. However, Nicolas Sarkozy was opposed to such a debate, believing it would be illegal.

=== Officially proposed policies ===
- Europe
  - Ségolène Royal (Socialist Party) proposed a referendum on a new European treaty for 2009. She declared she would request guarantees on the social policies followed by the European Union, in particular by reaching an agreement with German chancellor Angela Merkel on the controversial role of the European Central Bank – contrary to the U.S Federal Reserve, the ECB has an exclusive role to counter inflation. Royal stated she would negotiate with European partners in order to include economic growth and employment as aims within the ECB's policies.)
  - Nicolas Sarkozy (Union for a Popular Movement) proposed a simplified European treaty which would be ratified by the French Parliament instead of being submitted to a referendum. He also declared himself against the rule of unanimity in European decisions and opposed the accession of Turkey to the European Union. Furthermore, he said he would argue in favour of revaluing the euro, increasing the European defence budget and creating a European Foreign Affairs Minister.
- International policies
  - Royal proposed a new EU-led peace proposal in the Middle East. She also declared herself in favour of a nuclear deterrent power, increased European cooperation on military matters, relaunching the Euromediterranean Partnership (Barcelona Process) and promoting generic drugs in developing countries.
  - Sarkozy pledged to maintain the defence budget at its current level; develop new weapons; create a national security council, which would respond to the President of the Republic; launch a reflection on nuclear deterrence; limit French military presence in Africa; maintain a firm policy concerning the Iranian nuclear programme; enacted in the frame of the UN.
- Economic and social policies
  - Royal promised a minimum wage (known as the salaire minimum interprofessionnel de croissance, or SMIC) of 1,500 euros, with 90 percent of salary for year after losing job. She declared herself for the repeal of the CNE employment contract. She declared herself for the reimbursement of public aid to companies who offshored themselves, and would not support with public money firms that implement downsizing plans.
  - Sarkozy proposed to the contrary to adapt the 35-hour workweek previously established by PS minister Martine Aubry during Lionel Jospin's government by promoting overtime work.
- Energy and environment
  - Royal stated she would cut dependency on nuclear power and would aim to have renewable energy provide at least 20 percent of France's electricity before 2020. She also said she would create a public pole of energy around EDF and GDF (this is directly count to the GDF-Suez merger and announced in 2006 through the government of Dominique de Villepin, which involved privatisation).
  - Sarkozy said he would develop nuclear technologies and increase the tax on pollution. He also said he would promote international law on environment.
- Unemployment
  - Royal promised that no youth will stay unemployed for more than six months without receiving a publicly supported job or training. She also said she would create zero-interest loans to youth.
- Health
  - Royal said she would emphasise occupational safety and health; sanction physicians who refuse CMU patients; re-establish free medicine for illegal aliens; create a plan of research on rare diseases; grant a weekly free medical consultation for those 16–25 years old; free birth control for women under 25.
- Housing
  - Royal declared herself for a construction project of 120,000 council homes a year to cut the "housing crisis" as well as a private rent cap and lifelong guarantee of housing (in the continuation of the debate on the droit au logement, right to housing, on the model of Scotland's 2003 Homelessness Act). She said she would simplify procedures for evicting people who were deliberately not paying their rent; and would facilitate the purchase of council housing by people who have rented it for 15 years.
  - Sarkozy promised to provide assistance for those who want to buy their council homes and to eradicate homelessness within two years
- Immigration
  - Royal declared herself in favour of granting residency papers (i.e. of regularisation of the status of illegal aliens) if they have a work permit and reside in France for a sufficient time.
  - Sarkozy promised to cut immigration flux and favour "chosen immigration" (i.e. "qualified immigration").
- Taxes
  - Royal said she would not increase general taxation, would lighten burden on employment-creative firms and "consolidate" the 35-hour week, a goal which would pass by decreasing its negative effects. She said she would modulate tax on companies depending on if they use it for re-investment or to redistribute the profits to the shareholders. She also declared she would simplify the procedures to create new firms and better social protection for employers.
  - Sarkozy promised to cut taxes by four percent, increase the exemption for inheritance tax to 95% and grant a "right to work for more than 35 hours.".
- Law and order
  - Royal said she would force young offenders to military-like education. She promised to double the budget of the Minister of Justice, strengthen security on public transport, promote a law against domestic violence, reinforce judicial aid processes and create an independent organ of surveillance of the state of prisons.
  - Sarkozy declared himself in favour of minimum terms for reoffenders and tougher sentences on juvenile offenders.
- Culture and Media
  - Royal promised to support the tertiary sector of culture. She also pledged to take measures against concentration of media ownership and tax private TV companies (TF1, M6, etc.) to support public companies (France Télévisions, Arte, etc.).
  - Sarkozy promised free entry to national museums; to increase the budget of the Minister of Culture; to remove blocks to private patronage of the arts; to force public TV to increase the amount of cultural shows; to support authors' rights (droit d'auteur) and other copyright protections (DADVSI); and to support free software.
- Research
  - Royal said she would increase the research budget by 10% and increase the budget for universities to the extent that, within five years, it would reach the average of OECD countries.
  - Sarkozy said he would increase by 40% the budget dedicated to research by 2012.
- Budget
  - Royal said a 2.5% expected economic growth would finance her promises.
  - Sarkozy gave assurances he would cut the costs of the French Civil Service, which account for 45% of the budget.
- Institutional reforms
  - Royal said she would grant the right of foreigners to vote in local elections. She would repeal the veto of the Senate in constitutional matters. She declared herself in favour of the addition of a laïcité charter (secular charter) to the Constitution.
  - Sarkozy said he would establish minimum service in the public administration (thus restricting right of strike); cut unneeded government bodies; increase the productivity of the public administration; insure state expenses by taxes only; a two-term limit for the president; organise the responsibility of the President before the Parliament; limit the number of ministers to 15; non-replacement of one civil servant out of two which retires and increase of wages and training in the public administration.
- LGBT Issues
  - Royal proposed introducing a bill to legalize same-sex marriage and gay adoption.
  - Sarkozy voiced opposition to both gay marriage and adoption, although he did favour civil unions for same-sex couples. He maintained, however, close ties to MP Christine Boutin, known for her anti-gay views.

== Endorsements ==
=== French personalities ===
Approximately 200 French intellectuals expressed support for Ségolène Royal. These included the philosopher Étienne Balibar (a student of Louis Althusser), the editor François Maspero, the historian Pierre Rosanvallon, the psychoanalyst Fethi Benslama, the philosopher Jacques Bouveresse, the sociologist Robert Castel, the philosopher Catherine Colliot-Thélène, the writer Chloé Delaume, the historian Michel Dreyfus, the anthropologist Françoise Héritier, the sculptor Françoise Jolivet, the film-maker Roy Lekus, the sociologist Eric Macé, the philosopher Pierre Macherey, the philosopher Jean-Claude Monod the artist Ariane Mnouchkine, the economist Yann Moulier-Boutang (involved with Multitudes), the historian Gérard Noiriel, the historian Pascal Ory, the historian Michelle Perrot, the economist Thomas Piketty, the historian Benjamin Stora, the anthropologist Emmanuel Terray, the lawyer Michel Tubiana (former president of the Human Rights League), and the sociologist Loïc Wacquant (a student of Pierre Bourdieu).

Régis Debray called to vote first for a far-left candidate, then Royal in the second round.

On the other hand, the so-called Nouveaux Philosophes were split on their support. André Glucksmann called to vote Sarkozy, while Bernard-Henri Lévy voted for Ségolène Royal. Max Gallo, who had supported the left-wing Republican Jean-Pierre Chevènement in 2002, joined Sarkozy five years later. Pascal Bruckner and Alain Finkielkraut have also proved close to Sarkozy, although they did not declare support for him, but Sarkozy did support Finkielkraut after controversial statements made in Haaretz newspaper following the 2005 civil unrest. According to the journalist Jacques Julliard, the support of some French intellectuals for the 2003 invasion of Iraq is the root of their rallying to Sarkozy, following the creation of the review titled Le Meilleur des mondes (Brave New World). Pascal Bruckner, historian Stéphane Courtois, Thérèse Delpech, André Glucksmann, Romain Goupil, Pierre-André Taguieff, Olivier Rollin, and Pierre Rigoulot are frequent contributors to this review.

Tennis player Yannick Noah called to vote for Royal, while Sarkozy obtained the support of singers Johnny Hallyday, Mireille Mathieu and Faudel, of rapper Doc Gyneco, and former politician and current actor Bernard Tapie. He also had the support of actors Jean Reno and Christian Clavier, both residing in Neuilly-sur-Seine where Sarkozy was the mayor between 1983 and 2002 and of Gérard Depardieu. But also of industrialist Martin Bouygues, whose children attended the same school as Sarkozy's offspring. Comedian Dieudonné and author Alain Soral supported Jean-Marie Le Pen. Actress Juliette Binoche supported José Bové.

The song Elle est facho (She's a fascist) on the Rouge Sang album by singer Renaud released in 2006 gained particular media attention for lyrics in the last verse that translate as "she's a fascist and votes Sarko"

Prominent political commentator Alain Duhamel was suspended in 2006 after a video was published on DailyMotion, where he stated his personal intentions of voting for François Bayrou.

=== International support ===
Abroad, Silvio Berlusconi, the former prime minister of Italy, gave his support to Sarkozy immediately following the first round, while Romano Prodi, the then Italian premier and leader of the centre-left Union coalition, called for an alliance between Bayrou and Royal.

Spanish Prime Minister José Luis Rodríguez Zapatero has shown his support for Royal.

European commissioner and Vice-President Margot Wallström was criticised after she informally suggested support for Royal on her blog, celebrating the fact that a woman got into the second round. She said: "J'étais si contente de voir qu'une femme participera au deuxième tour de l‘élection présidentielle!" (I was so happy to see that a woman would be participating in the second round of the presidential election!) Commissioners are not meant to be politically biased in elections under their code of conduct. Wallström is a social-democrat, like Royal. José Manuel Barroso, the head of the European Commission, has privately discussed the idea of forming a "strategic partnership" with Mr. Sarkozy.

Many U.S. pundits and western economists expressed support for Nicolas Sarkozy. Steve Forbes devoted several columns in the influential financial publication FORBES Magazine. The London-based magazine The Economist also expressed support for Sarkozy's economic platform.

=== Alleged Libyan financial contributions to Sarkozy ===
In 2011, according to the son of the Libyan leader Saif Al-Islam Gaddafi, Sarkozy was provided with financial support from Libya during the presidential election. In 2012, Mediapart published material revealing Gaddafi's financial support to Nicolas Sarkozy for the election.

In March 2018 Sarkozy was charged for corruption.

== Opinion polls ==
A pro-Sarkozy sticker, after being defaced, in Paris, France. (Translation: "Together ~~everything~~ NOTHING becomes possible.")

French law prohibits publishing the results of opinion polls related to the election during the day of the election and the preceding day, so as to prevent undue influencing of the vote. No estimate can be given before Sunday 20:00, when the last voting office closes and official counts begin to be released. However, media from neighbouring countries, which are not bound by these regulations, have long broadcast estimates (Télévision Suisse Romande in particular). In 2007, the issue took a particular importance because of the generalisation of blogs and Internet pages. Journalist Jean-Marc Morandini stirred turmoil when he announced his intention of publishing results on his blog as soon as 18:00. Another problem was that the results from the voting offices in the Americas (consulates and French overseas possessions) were counted on Saturday night, and some began circulating rumours as to these results.

First round

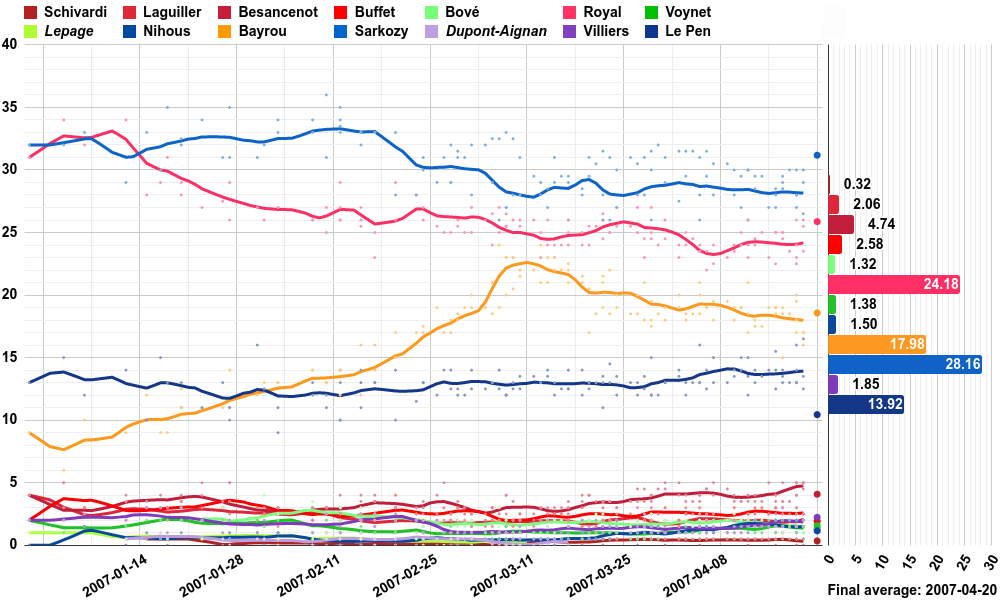

Second round

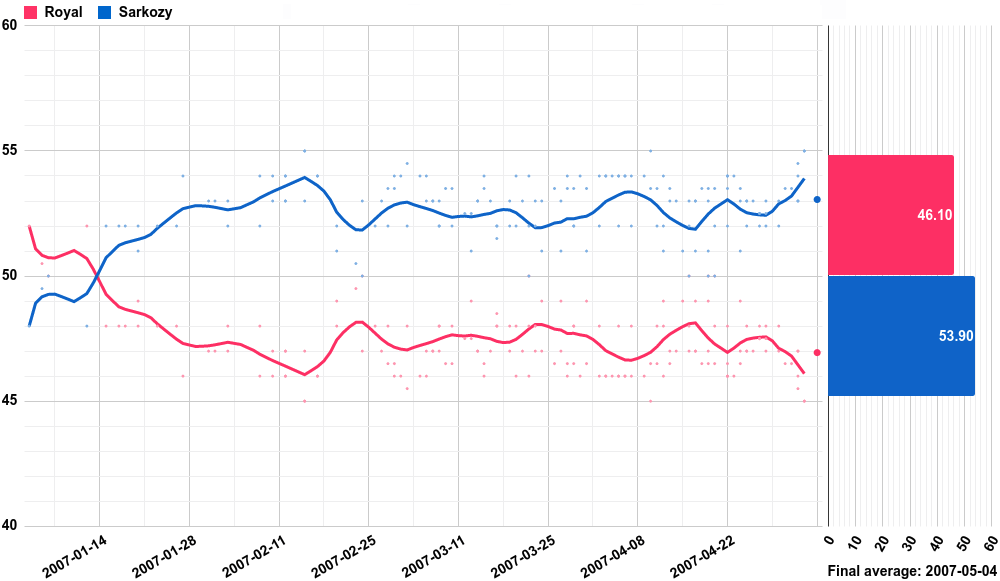

== Results ==
The first round saw a very high turnout of 83.8% – 36.7 million of the 44.5 million electorate voted from a population of 64.1 million (not including French people living abroad). The results of that round saw Sarkozy and Royal qualify for the second round with Sarkozy getting 31% and Royal 26%. François Bayrou came third (19%) and Jean-Marie Le Pen fourth (10%), unlike in 2002 when Le Pen got a surprising 16.9% and qualified for the second round.

Immediately after the first round's results were made official, four defeated left-wing candidates – José Bové, Marie-George Buffet, Arlette Laguiller and Dominique Voynet – urged their supporters to vote for Royal. This was the first time since 1981 that Laguiller had endorsed the Socialist Party's candidate. Olivier Besancenot called his supporters to vote against Sarkozy. Frédéric Nihous and Gérard Schivardi never officially supported either Royal or Sarkozy. Philippe de Villiers called for a vote for Sarkozy. Le Pen told his voters to "abstain massively" in the second round.

On 25 April, Bayrou declared he would not support either candidate in the runoff, and announced he would form a new political party called the Democratic Movement. He criticised both major candidates, and offered to debate them. Royal agreed to hold a televised debate, while Sarkozy offered to have a private discussion but not a televised debate.

By around 18:15 local time on 6 May, Belgian and Swiss news sources such as Le Soir, RTBF, La Libre Belgique and La Tribune de Genève had announced Nicolas Sarkozy as the winner of the second round, citing preliminary exit poll data. The final CSA estimate showed him winning with 53% of the votes cast. Royal conceded defeat to Sarkozy that evening.

First-round results by department Nicolas Sarkozy Ségolène Royal François Bayrou

Candidate	Party	First round		Second round	
Candidate	Party	Votes	%	Votes	%
Nicolas Sarkozy	Union for a Popular Movement	11,448,663	31.18	18,983,138	53.06
Ségolène Royal	Socialist Party	9,500,112	25.87	16,790,440	46.94
François Bayrou	Union for French Democracy	6,820,119	18.57		
Jean-Marie Le Pen	National Front	3,834,530	10.44		
Olivier Besancenot	Revolutionary Communist League	1,498,581	4.08		
Philippe de Villiers	Movement for France	818,407	2.23		
Marie-George Buffet	French Communist Party	707,268	1.93		
Dominique Voynet	The Greens	576,666	1.57		
Arlette Laguiller	Workers' Struggle	487,857	1.33		
José Bové	Miscellaneous left/environmentalist	483,008	1.32		
Frédéric Nihous	Hunting, Fishing, Nature and Traditions	420,645	1.15		
Gérard Schivardi	Workers' Party	123,540	0.34		
Total		36,719,396	100.00	35,773,578	100.00
Valid votes		36,719,396	98.56	35,773,578	95.80
Invalid/blank votes		534,846	1.44	1,568,426	4.20
Total votes		37,254,242	100.00	37,342,004	100.00
Registered voters/turnout		44,472,834	83.77	44,472,733	83.97
Source: Constitutional Council (First round · Second round)

=== First round and analysis ===
Nationwide, Nicolas Sarkozy obtained 31% and Ségolène Royal 26% – while in 2002, Jacques Chirac had obtained 20%, and Lionel Jospin 16.18%. The right-of-centre François Bayrou obtained 18.6% this time, nearly tripling his 2002 result (6.8%). National Front (FN) candidate, Jean-Marie Le Pen, made only 10.4%, compared to his stunning 16.9% finish in 2002. Along with the April–May shift to the far right made by Sarkozy, this has led many commentators to allege that traditional voters of the FN had been tempted by Sarkozy. Overall, the left-wing reached 36% of the votes, against 19% for the "centre", 33% for the right wing and 11% for the far right.

Other candidates received a much lower share of the vote than they had in 2002, with Olivier Besancenot (Revolutionary Communist League, LCR) failing to achieve the 5% necessary to have his political campaign reimbursed by the state. Besancenot received 4.1%, compared to 4.3% in 2002. He was followed by the traditionalist Philippe de Villiers (2.2%), Communist Marie-George Buffet (1.9%, compared to 3.4% for Robert Hue in 2002), Green candidate Dominique Voynet (1.6%, compared to 5.3% for Noël Mamère in 2002), Workers' Struggle's candidate Arlette Laguiller (1.3%, compared to 5.7% in 2002), alter-globalisation candidate José Bové (1.3%), Frédéric Nihous (1.2%, against 4.2% for Jean Saint-Josse in 2002) and finally Gérard Schivardi with 0.3% (Daniel Gluckstein had achieved 0.5% in 2002). The abstention rate was 15.4%.

With an overall record turnout of 83.8%, a level not achieved since the 1965 presidential election when turnout was 84.8%, the vast majority of the electorate decided not to stay home. Most of them decided against protest votes, and chose the vote utile (tactical voting, literally "useful vote"), that is, a vote for one of the purported leaders of the electoral race (Nicolas Sarkozy, Ségolène Royal and/or François Bayrou). The "Anyone But Sarkozy" push benefited both Bayrou and Royal, while the tactical voting, on the right or on the left, explains the low score of the other candidates, in contrast with the last presidential election's first round.

The electoral campaign saw a polarisation of the political scene, encapsulated by the "Anyone But Sarkozy" slogan on the left. But it also saw a reconfiguration of the political chessboard, with various left-wing figures and voters deciding to support Sarkozy against Royal, who saw opposition inside her own party. Bernard Tapie, a former Socialist, Max Gallo, who had supported left-wing Republican Jean-Pierre Chevènement in 2002, Eric Besson, etc., passed on Sarkozy's side. On the other hand, some right-wing voters, upset by Sarkozy's attitude on law and order, immigration, and even genetics (his recent declarations on paedophilia, homosexuality and suicides as genetically induced, denounced by the geneticist Axel Kahn), decided to vote for Bayrou. Centrist figures of the Socialist party, such as Michel Rocard and Bernard Kouchner, called for an alliance between Bayrou and Royal, which might have had consequences in the June 2007 legislative elections – these determined the parliamentary majority, and decided that France would not see another cohabitation between the President, head of state, and the Prime minister, leader of the government. Former socialist minister Claude Allègre stated such an alliance was "entirely conceivable", while Royal herself strongly criticised Rocard's comments. François Hollande, the national secretary of the Socialist Party and Ségolène Royal's partner, excluded any alliance with the centre-right, along with others left-wing leaders, such as Laurent Fabius or Dominique Voynet.

==== By department ====
Department	Nicolas Sarkozy	Ségolène Royal	François Bayrou	Jean-Marie Le Pen	Olivier Besancenot	Philippe de Villiers	Marie-George Buffet	Dominique Voynet	Arlette Laguiller	José Bové	Frédéric Nihous	Gérard Schivardi	Electorate	Votes	Valid votes	Invalid votes
Paris	371,604	336,407	219,660	48,481	22,099	11,618	12,872	16,261	6,188	10,904	1,677	1,770	1,221,993	1,068,274	1,059,541	8,733
Seine-et-Marne	226,884	161,002	126,933	75,584	27,180	14,789	11,812	11,269	8,278	6,779	4,197	1,819	802,133	684,951	676,526	8,425
Yvelines	291,648	178,943	169,312	56,867	21,470	14,911	9,883	12,682	7,010	6,753	3,450	1,485	894,380	781,884	774,414	7,470
Essonne	201,596	174,519	130,961	55,358	23,164	11,773	12,638	11,448	7,178	6,619	3,014	1,555	742,932	646,909	639,823	7,086
Hauts-de-Seine	297,836	202,149	165,812	43,025	19,623	9,843	13,495	11,299	5,402	6,555	1,888	1,373	904,665	786,507	778,300	8,207
Seine-Saint-Denis	155,887	198,180	97,058	52,518	24,281	7,774	20,542	7,823	6,489	7,157	1,474	1,460	708,171	587,920	580,643	7,277
Val-de Marne	200,836	183,058	124,697	46,119	22,154	8,951	19,232	10,132	5,875	6,766	1,779	1,549	745,956	638,232	631,148	7,084
Val-de Oise	185,134	158,743	108,642	52,610	21,276	9,819	10,496	8,973	6,542	5,910	2,370	1,377	675,114	578,980	571,892	7,088
Ardennes	46,934	39,683	23,001	26,185	8,639	4,173	3,035	2,087	3,557	1,661	2,140	503	199,115	163,570	161,598	1,972
Aube	59,398	33,280	27,128	26,101	6,227	4,980	2,837	2,286	2,476	1,592	2,175	521	204,692	171,162	169,001	2,161
Marne	103,561	63,565	54,596	42,514	13,099	7,906	4,982	4,697	5,451	2,726	2,925	817	382,287	311,198	306,839	4,359
Haute-Marne	36,790	23,746	17,917	19,722	5,457	3,391	1,611	1,656	2,076	1,435	1,776	430	142,353	118,088	116,007	2,081
Aisne	91,118	72,835	42,000	53,744	17,059	8,124	6,327	3,695	7,223	3,347	4,180	1,313	377,475	315,501	310,965	4,536
Oise	145,518	94,248	70,559	66,040	20,606	11,160	8,225	6,528	8,461	4,721	4,819	1,461	536,752	448,248	442,346	5,902
Somme	94,514	84,835	48,694	48,958	20,055	7,445	7,751	4,002	8,254	3,551	11,418	1,349	410,269	345,897	340,826	5,071
Eure	105,755	71,524	61,377	44,462	16,775	9,543	6,223	4,854	5,637	3,940	5,428	1,192	404,264	341,318	336,710	4,608
Seine-Maritime	204,170	186,140	123,248	82,333	41,537	16,149	20,153	10,852	14,411	8,623	8,289	2,412	873,585	728,952	718,317	10,635
Cher	53,656	44,326	33,775	22,076	9,750	5,193	7,238	2,673	3,350	2,503	2,851	782	232,301	191,490	188,173	3,317
Eure-et-Loir	80,563	53,874	44,282	29,798	9,834	7,803	3,281	3,434	3,635	2,309	3,301	1,073	293,851	246,686	243,187	3,499
Indre	39,637	36,873	26,364	17,358	7,905	4,679	3,684	2,003	2,741	2,275	2,837	729	177,334	150,217	147,085	3,132
Indre-et-Loire	104,125	84,345	68,641	30,865	15,480	10,391	5,714	5,579	4,772	4,180	3,791	1,233	401,678	343,993	339,116	4,877
Loir-et-Cher	60,251	44,272	39,214	25,839	9,164	6,918	3,648	3,108	3,034	2,358	3,343	749	240,542	205,142	201,898	3,244
Loiret	122,197	81,664	65,901	42,976	13,214	10,736	6,438	5,858	4,747	3,770	4,444	1,130	435,658	368,069	363,075	4,994
Calvados	120,191	103,481	83,115	36,939	21,490	10,324	5,407	6,786	6,681	5,591	9,648	1,251	482,677	417,156	410,904	6,252
Manche	100,989	67,719	65,915	28,953	14,185	8,813	3,788	4,700	5,122	4,919	8,727	1,184	371,781	320,286	315,014	5,272
Orne	59,216	37,800	34,887	22,494	8,221	6,503	2,002	2,875	2,817	2,643	3,032	646	216,406	185,815	183,136	2,679
Côte-d'Or	94,875	71,385	56,946	34,479	11,427	6,746	3,823	4,693	4,005	3,626	2,695	1,057	349,518	299,305	295,757	3,548
Nièvre	36,711	40,954	21,544	16,714	7,054	3,514	4,476	1,851	2,319	1,812	2,033	538	169,334	141,674	139,520	2,154
Saône-et-Loire	100,475	86,741	61,289	38,975	15,049	8,348	6,383	4,222	5,004	4,081	4,502	1,177	408,946	342,267	336,246	6,021
Yonne	65,483	42,014	35,434	28,873	8,716	6,363	3,472	2,924	3,112	2,777	2,850	836	245,539	205,734	202,854	2,880
Nord	414,543	351,223	221,217	195,624	73,520	24,034	43,735	20,501	29,563	15,149	22,192	3,439	1,776,070	1,435,410	1,414,740	20,670
Pas-de-Calais	224,750	221,798	119,477	140,232	54,373	16,648	30,286	10,881	23,105	9,444	21,406	2,885	1,078,462	890,610	875,285	15,325
Meurthe-et-Moselle	115,573	103,637	74,170	51,044	22,067	7,965	8,712	6,424	7,700	4,720	2,810	1,234	490,248	411,100	406,056	5,044
Meuse	35,543	25,053	20,823	19,349	5,928	3,019	1,402	1,795	2,079	1,501	1,681	391	141,267	120,310	118,564	1,746
Moselle	182,782	132,024	112,502	88,556	31,061	12,070	6,500	9,521	11,490	6,301	3,438	1,686	738,889	606,898	597,931	8,967
Vosges	70,018	54,882	42,703	37,749	11,875	6,129	2,627	3,822	4,305	3,571	2,450	889	288,720	245,336	241,020	4,316
Bas-Rhin	213,050	100,233	131,484	77,555	18,631	12,292	3,195	11,897	7,767	7,384	2,904	1,452	717,337	596,047	587,844	8,203
Haut-Rhin	149,334	71,050	82,855	58,177	14,679	10,200	2,905	8,485	6,054	6,374	2,238	1,070	506,877	419,884	413,421	6,463
Doubs	96,760	74,320	50,661	36,584	12,419	6,492	3,248	5,637	4,470	4,440	2,837	907	353,132	303,075	298,775	4,300
Jura	46,144	35,952	29,520	21,167	7,013	4,301	3,084	3,413	2,451	2,610	2,191	714	187,083	161,252	158,560	2,692
Haute-Saône	45,990	35,458	22,010	24,894	7,273	3,770	1,914	2,386	2,531	2,166	2,143	553	179,506	153,871	151,088	2,783
Territoire de Belfort	23,356	19,471	11,894	11,527	3,960	1,788	955	1,441	1,427	1,144	640	269	93,779	79,081	77,872	1,209
Loire-Atlantique	215,346	228,851	160,022	50,401	33,704	23,947	10,724	14,582	9,604	9,946	9,447	2,187	892,016	778,034	768,761	9,273
Maine-et-Loire	144,495	108,443	108,245	33,201	19,717	20,392	4,893	8,669	6,430	5,421	5,229	1,463	539,902	474,390	466,598	7,792
Mayenne	60,553	42,659	44,476	14,256	7,755	6,023	1,678	3,551	2,391	2,498	2,177	508	220,022	192,151	188,525	3,626
Sarthe	96,903	85,077	61,200	34,994	17,862	12,145	5,765	5,590	5,476	4,386	3,282	1,244	401,328	341,008	333,924	7,084
Vendée	119,640	87,244	83,626	25,991	14,649	45,388	3,677	6,559	4,580	3,560	6,539	1,079	464,249	409,150	402,532	6,618
Côtes-d'Armor	100,316	116,827	81,973	28,723	19,697	7,714	9,054	7,327	5,539	5,918	4,469	1,263	445,906	393,819	388,820	4,999
Finistère	157,307	168,411	131,177	37,600	28,839	10,058	9,574	10,659	7,121	8,504	6,092	1,527	667,662	583,484	576,869	6,615
Ille-et-Vilaine	162,372	162,903	137,432	35,974	25,968	12,793	5,980	12,073	7,398	7,582	5,442	1,319	665,646	584,655	577,236	7,419
Morbihan	137,510	115,949	101,406	41,629	19,701	10,647	7,252	8,967	5,604	6,480	5,204	1,060	534,901	467,329	461,409	5,920
Charente	58,769	65,730	37,157	19,833	10,239	7,017	3,866	3,105	3,110	3,152	3,875	895	259,756	220,168	216,748	3,420
Charente Maritime	114,119	104,916	65,306	33,896	15,408	13,997	5,840	5,634	4,662	4,987	9,136	1,353	453,394	384,612	379,254	5,358
Deux-Sèvres	60,847	77,655	43,418	13,256	9,043	9,489	2,227	3,536	2,676	2,543	3,697	734	269,277	234,278	229,121	5,157
Vienne	70,350	73,633	48,001	21,089	10,908	8,130	3,964	4,035	3,495	3,254	4,841	854	299,185	256,618	252,554	4,064
Dordogne	72,248	80,031	46,876	25,436	11,579	6,002	8,899	3,609	3,283	4,630	4,566	1,279	309,106	272,991	268,438	4,553
Gironde	230,955	241,019	162,668	75,062	33,329	14,302	15,166	12,419	10,122	10,566	14,626	3,200	953,526	833,538	823,434	10,104
Landes	67,087	76,855	48,998	17,300	9,453	3,931	6,355	3,039	2,641	2,712	5,395	878	283,071	248,185	244,644	3,541
Lot-et-Garonne	59,914	51,813	37,930	25,682	7,930	4,681	4,545	2,589	2,183	3,280	3,933	933	238,999	208,463	205,413	3,050
Pyrénées-Atlantiques	101,954	107,582	121,074	25,185	15,939	5,112	6,826	6,629	3,787	6,753	6,780	1,282	474,672	413,823	408,903	4,920
Ariège	21,400	34,179	15,370	9,491	4,949	1,634	2,941	1,489	1,125	2,610	1,766	704	113,831	99,202	97,658	1,544
Aveyron	54,316	51,344	40,810	13,959	7,492	3,807	2,868	2,600	1,907	5,579	3,332	986	217,981	192,289	189,000	3,289
Haute-Garonne	182,008	225,769	132,091	57,621	25,602	9,997	11,694	10,821	7,009	11,221	5,601	2,821	789,194	690,638	682,255	8,383
Gers	31,821	38,049	24,680	10,287	4,461	2,365	2,334	1,592	1,202	2,000	2,575	644	140,324	124,008	122,010	1,998
Lot	28,224	37,260	23,210	8,412	5,195	2,251	2,655	1,697	1,352	3,025	2,517	716	132,896	118,301	116,514	1,787
Hautes-Pyrénées	34,280	46,510	35,270	11,618	6,714	2,337	4,681	1,834	1,621	2,182	2,858	728	176,279	152,798	150,633	2,165
Tarn	64,756	70,425	45,128	25,423	9,464	5,066	4,609	3,336	2,799	4,436	3,501	1,383	276,354	244,342	240,326	4,016
Tarn-et-Garonne	41,287	38,503	25,082	17,956	5,300	3,393	2,294	1,898	1,598	2,634	3,130	796	165,833	145,968	143,871	2,097
Corrèze	44,839	47,538	28,765	12,125	7,193	3,415	6,176	1,890	1,926	2,196	3,065	781	187,233	162,919	159,909	3,010
Creuse	22,362	23,674	13,596	7,080	4,460	2,155	2,367	1,046	1,288	1,388	1,773	396	99,799	83,276	81,585	1,691
Haute-Vienne	56,671	71,025	40,087	19,320	12,388	5,219	7,152	3,208	3,352	3,045	3,193	1,105	265,865	230,676	225,765	4,911
Ain	109,211	65,449	62,119	38,873	10,819	8,013	4,243	5,473	3,665	4,004	3,670	1,059	372,899	320,859	316,598	4,261
Ardèche	55,803	50,755	37,453	22,912	9,220	4,962	4,986	3,354	2,425	4,387	4,624	1,001	235,578	204,732	201,882	2,850
Drôme	86,063	69,685	53,336	34,402	11,895	7,337	5,307	5,351	3,278	5,025	4,734	1,177	338,089	291,578	287,590	3,988
Isère	201,815	179,413	128,983	67,423	25,645	12,995	13,160	12,480	7,651	10,300	6,007	2,186	784,199	676,859	668,058	8,801
Loire	126,310	101,389	85,007	50,912	17,793	11,381	8,334	6,802	5,918	5,892	4,335	1,634	505,865	431,845	425,707	6,138
Rhône	311,204	211,736	185,528	80,674	26,840	17,247	13,295	15,484	8,681	10,263	4,269	2,056	1,037,635	896,454	887,277	9,177
Savoie	81,109	53,447	49,138	26,325	9,555	5,396	4,491	5,236	2,691	4,529	2,153	795	287,948	248,278	244,865	3,413
Haute-Savoie	149,415	74,808	88,107	38,776	11,944	8,573	3,808	8,817	3,786	7,020	2,823	1,055	472,822	404,056	398,932	5,124
Allier	60,994	55,744	39,700	21,860	10,981	5,292	9,897	2,863	3,370	2,646	3,119	918	259,537	221,525	217,384	4,141
Cantal	34,726	24,984	20,956	8,501	4,022	2,122	1,502	1,235	1,314	1,583	2,567	573	123,363	105,850	104,085	1,765
Haute-Loire	42,710	33,473	31,593	17,341	7,002	3,757	2,167	2,236	2,114	2,645	2,328	907	173,258	150,896	148,273	2,623
Puy-de-Dôme	99,723	111,275	77,146	31,102	19,517	7,559	8,354	5,7546	6,138	6,658	4,460	1,808	443,260	385,768	379,496	6,272
Aude	57,024	66,590	30,086	28,635	8,905	3,891	6,077	2,577	2,260	3,628	2,833	4,376	254,404	219,939	216,882	3,057
Gard	126,711	97,027	65,400	64,248	17,331	8,391	11,920	5,505	4,868	7,204	5,584	1,981	488,899	421,444	416,170	5,274
Hérault	184,815	154,608	90,822	79,191	23,186	9,985	12,808	8,610	6,501	11,123	8,534	3,228	699,684	600,924	593,411	7,513
Lozère	16,517	11,799	10,950	4,900	2,027	1,011	868	721	532	1,260	1,065	275	60,016	52,670	51,925	745
Pyrénées-Orientales	84,952	65,486	37,485	37,494	11,149	4,888	6,917	3,374	3,014	4,187	3,340	1,576	314,769	267,591	263,862	3,729
Alpes-de Haute-Provence	30,321	25,531	16,781	11,365	4,332	2,187	2,737	1,727	1,222	2,258	2,056	623	118,936	102,793	101,140	1,653
Haute Alpes	26,774	21,385	17,289	7,792	3,634	1,948	1,621	1,805	872	2,164	1,720	319	102,955	88,527	87,323	1,204
Alpes-Maritimes	258,626	106,216	89,143	79,926	14,223	10,883	10,533	8,512	4,545	6,220	2,985	1,442	721,716	599,324	593,254	6,070
Bouches-du-Rhône	357,593	248,290	157,136	144,807	36,107	17,300	30,895	13,945	10,856	14,312	9,081	3,917	1,260,916	1,056,954	1,044,239	12,715
Var	235,068	110,659	90,550	82,292	19,014	13,465	10,618	8,107	5,914	6,860	6,682	2,261	716,795	598,281	591,490	6,791
Vaucluse	101,853	66,955	48,263	51,648	11,021	9,068	5,564	4,243	2,998	5,149	4,010	1,373	370,625	316,193	312,145	4,048
Corse-du-Sud	26,443	13,836	9,144	11,212	2,988	955	2,285	972	582	762	1,057	209	94,555	71,477	70,445	1,032
Haute-Corse	30,376	19,657	9,835	12,221	2,953	953	2,879	1,148	764	897	1,202	241	111,839	84,356	83,126	1,230
Guadeloupe	71,568	64,261	14,292	5,335	4,276	790	1,252	2,036	1,834	1,560	383	301	303,311	179,365	167,888	11,477
Martinique	53,825	77,266	13,715	3,367	4,057	777	901	1,479	2,049	1,388	338	216	287,465	169,584	159,378	10,206
French Guiana	14,650	11,526	4,431	1,953	911	191	220	533	346	505	103	59	62,526	36,743	35,428	1,315
Réunion	89,800	165,464	47,574	17,469	9,419	2,095	10,645	4,608	4,288	4,847	1,061	695	510,558	370,719	357,965	12,754
Sainte Pierre and Miquelon	685	732	633	184	179	17	8	79	40	141	45	5	4,923	3,106	2,748	358
Mayotte	7,574	6,943	6,379	1,049	775	178	355	374	465	431	196	133	64,440	29,812	24,852	4,960
Wallis and Futuna	3,125	2,832	804	86	71	14	40	60	63	41	25	15	11,166	7,208	7,176	32
French Polynesia	51,883	47,817	8,199	2,175	913	369	280	1,529	416	719	228	186	167,593	115,843	114,714	1,129
New Caledonia	44,650	21,296	7,942	5,091	1,561	707	374	1,681	703	5,274	326	156	146,068	91,596	89,761	1,835
Source: European Election Database

==== By region ====
Region	Nicolas Sarkozy	Ségolène Royal	François Bayrou	Jean-Marie Le Pen	Olivier Besancenot	Philippe de Villiers	Marie-George Buffet	Dominique Voynet	Arlette Laguiller	José Bové	Frédéric Nihous	Gérard Schivardi	Electorate	Votes	Valid votes	Invalid votes
Île-de-France	1,931,425	1,593,001	1,143,075	430,562	181,247	89,478	110,970	89,887	52,962	57,443	19,849	12,388	6,695,344	5,773,657	5,712,287	61,370
Champagne-Ardenne	246,683	160,274	122,642	114,522	33,422	20,450	12,465	10,726	13,560	7,414	9,016	2,271	928,447	764,018	753,445	10,573
Picardy	331,150	251,918	161,253	168,742	57,720	26,729	22,303	14,225	23,938	11,619	20,417	4,123	1,324,496	1,109,646	1,094,137	15,509
Upper Normandy	309,925	257,664	184,625	126,795	58,312	25,692	26,376	15,706	20,048	12,563	13,717	3,604	1,277,849	1,070,270	1,055,027	15,243
Centre	460,429	345,354	278,177	168,912	65,347	45,720	30,003	22,655	22,279	17,395	20,567	5,696	1,781,364	1,505,597	1,482,534	23,063
Lower Normandy	280,396	209,000	183,917	88,386	43,896	25,640	11,197	14,361	14,620	13,153	21,407	3,081	1,070,864	923,257	909,054	14,203
Burgundy	297,544	241,094	175,213	119,041	42,246	24,971	18,154	13,690	14,440	12,296	12,080	3,608	1,173,337	988,980	974,377	14,603
Nord-Pas-de-Calais	639,293	573,021	340,694	335,856	127,893	40,682	74,021	31,382	52,668	24,593	43,598	6,324	2,854,532	2,326,020	2,290,025	35,995
Lorraine	403,916	315,596	250,198	196,698	70,931	29,183	19,241	21,562	25,574	16,093	10,379	4,200	1,659,124	1,383,644	1,363,571	20,073
Alsace	362,384	171,283	214,339	135,732	33,310	22,492	6,100	20,382	13,821	13,758	5,142	2,522	1,224,214	1,015,931	1,001,265	14,666
Franche-Comté	212,250	165,201	114,085	94,172	30,665	16,351	9,201	12,877	10,879	10,360	7,811	2,443	813,500	697,279	686,295	10,984
Pays de la Loire	636,937	552,274	457,569	158,843	93,687	107,895	26,737	38,951	28,481	25,811	26,674	6,481	2,517,517	2,194,733	2,160,340	34,393
Brittany	557,505	564,090	451,988	143,926	94,205	41,212	31,860	39,026	25,662	28,484	21,207	5,169	2,314,115	2,029,287	2,004,334	24,953
Poitou-Charentes	304,085	321,934	193,882	88,074	45,598	38,633	15,897	16,310	13,943	13,936	21,549	3,836	1,281,612	1,095,676	1,077,677	17,999
Aquitaine	532,158	557,300	417,546	168,665	78,230	34,028	41,791	28,285	22,016	27,941	35,300	7,572	2,259,374	1,977,000	1,950,832	26,168
Midi-Pyrénées	458,092	542,039	341,641	154,767	69,177	30,850	34,076	25,267	18,613	33,687	25,280	8,778	2,012,692	1,767,546	1,742,267	25,279
Limousin	123,872	142,237	82,448	38,525	24,041	10,789	15,695	6,144	6,566	6,629	8,031	2,282	552,897	476,871	467,259	9,612
Rhône-Alpes	1,120,930	806,682	689,671	360,297	123,711	75,904	57,624	62,997	38,095	51,420	32,615	10,963	4,035,035	3,474,661	3,430,909	43,752
Auvergne	238,153	225,476	169,395	78,804	41,522	18,730	21,920	12,090	12,936	13,532	12,474	4,206	999,418	864,039	849,238	14,801
Languedoc-Roussillon	470,019	395,510	234,743	214,468	62,598	28,166	38,590	20,787	17,175	27,402	21,356	11,436	1,817,772	1,562,568	1,542,250	20,318
Provence-Alpes-Côte d'Azur	1,010,235	579,036	419,162	377,830	88,331	54,851	61,968	38,339	26,407	36,963	26,534	9,935	3,291,943	2,762,072	2,729,591	32,481
Corsica	56,819	33,493	18,979	23,433	5,941	1,908	5,164	2,120	1,346	1,659	2,259	450	206,394	155,833	153,571	2,262
Guadeloupe	71,568	64,261	14,292	5,335	4,276	790	1,252	2,036	1,834	1,560	383	301	303,311	179,365	167,888	11,477
Martinique	53,825	77,266	13,715	3,367	4,057	777	901	1,479	2,049	1,388	338	216	287,465	169,584	159,378	10,206
French Guiana	14,650	11,526	4,431	1,953	911	191	220	533	346	505	103	59	62,526	36,743	35,428	1,315
Réunion	89,800	165,464	47,574	17,469	9,419	2,095	10,645	4,608	4,288	4,847	1,061	695	510,558	370,719	357,965	12,754
Saint Pierre and Miquelon	685	732	633	184	179	17	8	79	40	141	45	5	4,923	3,106	2,748	358
Mayotte	7,574	6,943	6,379	1,049	775	178	355	374	465	431	196	133	64,440	29,812	24,852	4,960
Wallis and Futuna	3,125	2,832	804	86	71	14	40	60	63	41	25	15	11,166	7,208	7,176	32
French Polynesia	51,883	47,817	8,199	2,175	913	369	280	1,529	416	719	228	186	167,593	115,843	114,714	1,129
New Caledonia	44,650	21,296	7,942	5,091	1,561	707	374	1,681	703	5,274	326	156	146,068	91,596	89,761	1,835
Source: European Election Database

=== Urban votes ===
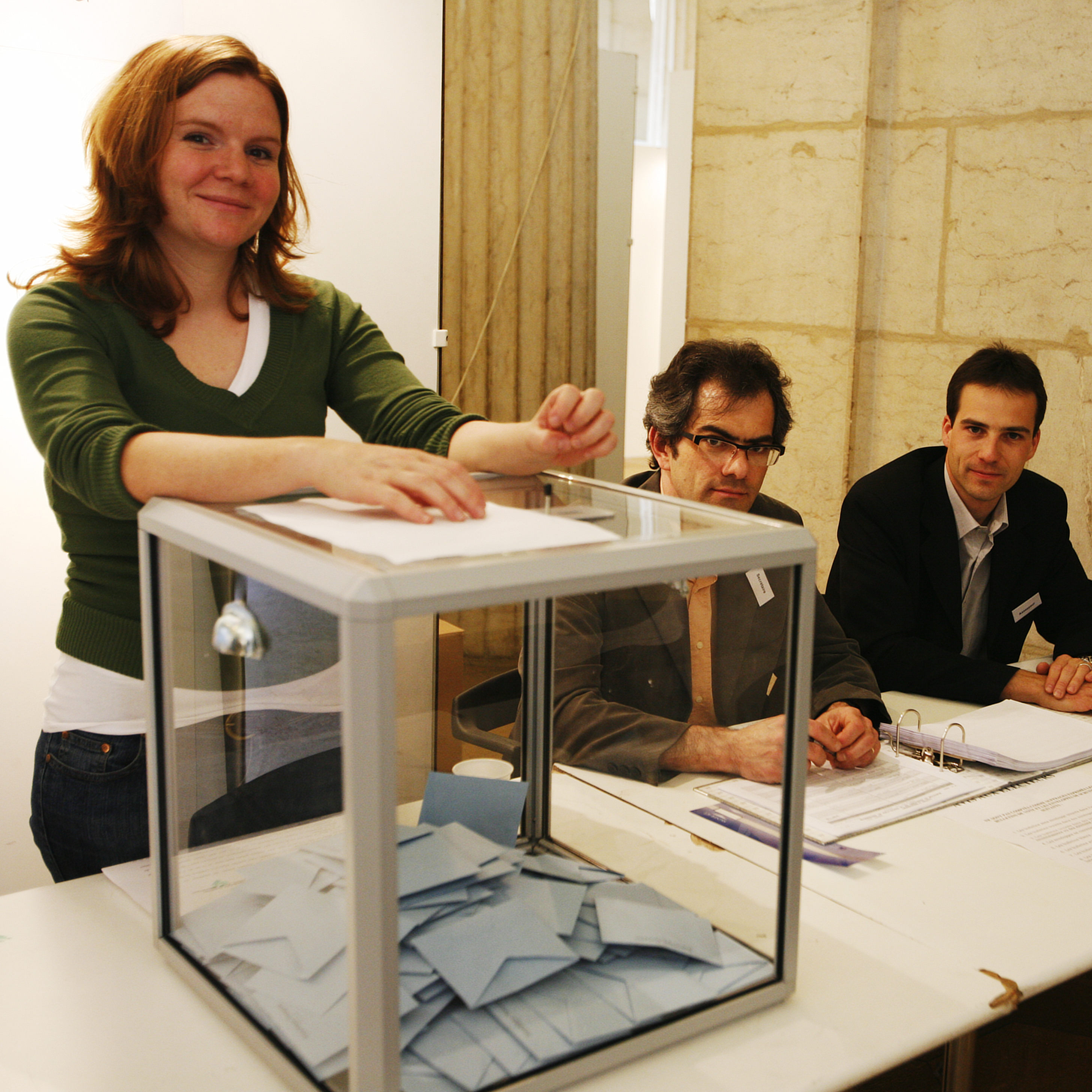

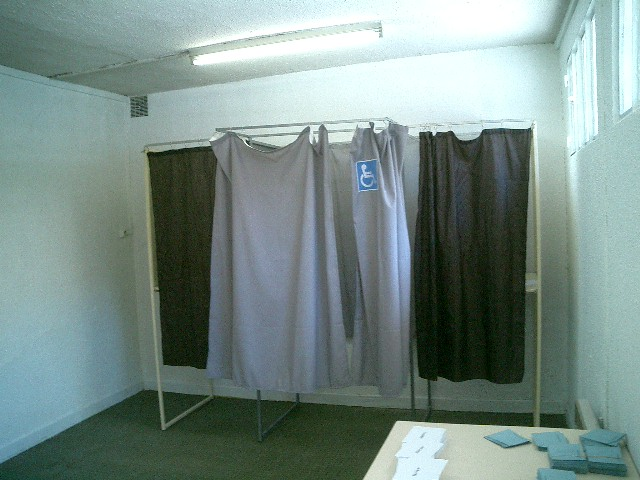
Voting booth in Vaulnaveys-le-Haut.

In urban areas, most lower and middle-income neighbourhoods and cities voted largely for Ségolène Royal. In the tenth arrondissement of Paris, Royal obtained 42% against 25% for Sarkozy, and 20.35% for Bayrou; in the 11th arrondissement, Royal obtained more than 40.8% to 25.8% for Sarkozy and 20.9% for Bayrou. In the 18th arrondissement, Royal obtained 41.1% against 23.4% for Sarkozy; in the 19th arrondissement, Royal obtained more than 39%, against almost 28% for Sarkozy; and in the 20th arrondissement, Royal obtained 42.4% against 23.2% for Sarkozy, and 18.3% for Bayrou. Royal also narrowly beat Sarkozy in the normally conservative city of Bordeaux (31.4% against 30.8%, and 22% for Bayrou), as well as in Brest, Caen, Clermont-Ferrand, Grenoble, Nantes, Rouen, Lille, Le Mans, Montpellier, Saint-Étienne, Limoges, Amiens, Pau (where Bayrou finished first), Rennes and Toulouse (the historical base of the former Radical-Socialist Party). Working-class Paris suburbs (called les banlieues) also massively voted for Royal. This was more or less expected, in particular with the high level of voter registration by suburban youths, who had been strongly opposed to Sarkozy since the 2005 riots during which he had made controversial remarks. Meanwhile, a large number of university students had participated in the protests against the CPE, proposed by Sarkozy's UMP party, in the spring of 2006; they also strongly backed Royal. She consequently came first in Nanterre, with almost 36% against 23% for Sarkozy. She reached 41.6% in Saint-Denis, against 19.6% for Sarkozy and 15.5% for Bayrou. In Évry, she also passed the 40% line, while Sarkozy received only 23.6%. In Créteil, she won a closer race, gaining 35% to Sarkozy's 30% and 18% for Bayrou. In the department of Seine-Saint-Denis, home to many people of immigrant origin, Royal obtained 34.2% to 26.8% for Sarkozy and 16.7% for Bayrou.

In contrast, wealthy arrondissements of Paris voted for Sarkozy. The prosperous 16th arrondissement gave him 64% of its vote, against 16.4% for Bayrou and only 11.27% for Royal; the seventh arrondissement voted for 56% in favour of Sarkozy, to 20.35 for Bayrou and 15.35% for Royal; the eighth arrondissement voted at more than 58% for Sarkozy to 18.65% for Bayrou and 14% for Royal; the 15th arrondissement voted 41.5% for Sarkozy against 24.3% for Royal and 22.9% for Bayrou. The mostly wealthy Paris suburbs of the Hauts-de-Seine department, home of Neuilly-sur-Seine where Sarkozy is mayor, voted 38.3% for him, against 26% for Royal and 21.3% for Bayrou. Sarkozy also won in the Essonne department (more than 31% against 27% for Royal), in the Seine-et-Marne (33.5% to almost 24% for Royal) as well as in the Yvelines (37.7% against 23% for Royal and 22% for Bayrou).

Marseille, the second-largest city of France, went Sarkozy's way overall as he won 34.25% of the vote to 27.1% for Royal and only 14.1% for Bayrou (putting a close third ahead of Le Pen, who obtained 13.4%). However, in working-class neighbourhoods of the north of Marseille, such as Savine (15th arrondissement) and the Busserine (14th arrondissement), Royal received overwhelming support, receiving 60% of the vote in Busserine.

France's third-largest city, Lyon, also was won by Sarkozy, who received 34.5% of the vote to 27.3% for Royal and 22% for Bayrou. He triumphed as well in the wealthy city of Aix-en-Provence with 36.8%, against 25.4% for Royal and 19.8% for Bayrou. In Nice, a conservative stronghold, Sarkozy obtained more than 41% against 20.4% for Royal and less than 15% for Bayrou. Sarkozy also narrowly beat Royal in the industrial port of Le Havre (29% against 26.8%), as well as in Avignon, Nîmes, Metz, Nancy, and Strasbourg (these last three cities belonging to the Alsace-Lorraine region).

=== Regional votes ===
A map of France's departments shows the candidate of the Socialist Party, Ségolène Royal, came first in the South-West and the Massif Central, which were traditional bases of the Radical-Socialist Party during the Third Republic. She also topped the poll in Brittany, except in the department of Morbihan, but a fifth of electors in Brittany voted for Bayrou. Nièvre and Seine-Saint-Denis were other departments where she came first, as well as the overseas departments of Martinique and Réunion and the overseas territory of Saint Pierre and Miquelon. Sarkozy came first everywhere else, except for Pyrénées-Atlantiques, where Bayrou topped the poll in the department of his birth.

The left regressed, compared 2002, in the Nord-Pas-de-Calais region, which has traditionally favored Socialist and Communist candidates. The Nord department, hit hard during the 1980s by an industrial crisis, gave a plurality to Sarkozy (29.3%), while Royal won 24.8% (and won the city of Lille) and Bayrou received 15.6%. Marie-George Buffet barely received 5% in the constituency of the Communist deputy Alain Bocquet.

The Haute-Garonne, traditional Radical-Socialist territory, voted (including its capital, Toulouse), for Ségolène Royal, giving her 33%, against less than 27% for Sarkozy and slightly more than 19% for Bayrou. The Corrèze, where Jacques Chirac began his political career as the deputy of Ussel, also voted slightly in favour of Royal, as did the Creuse, one of the least-populated departments of France.

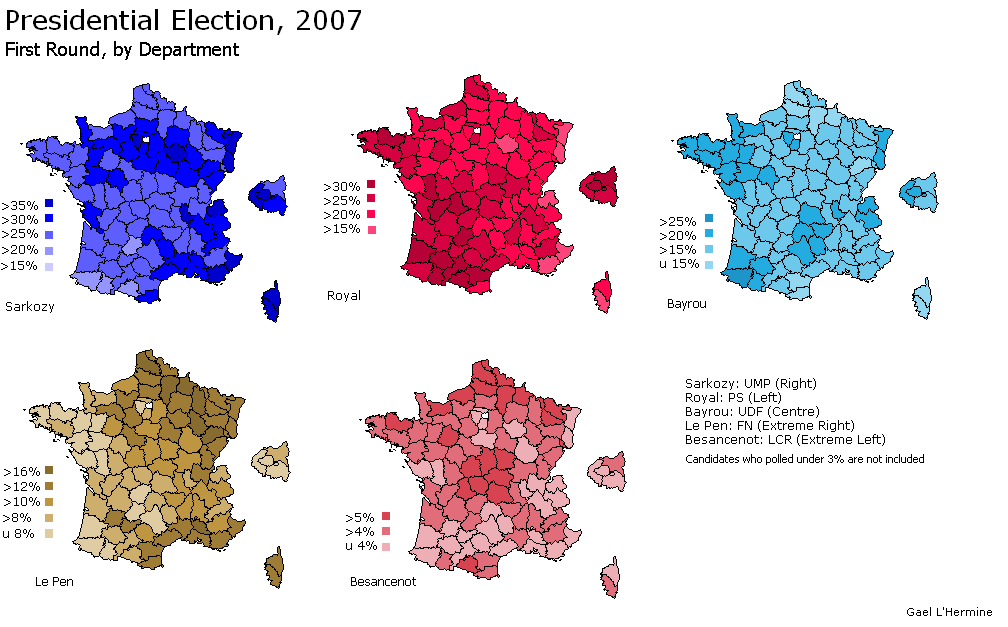
Results of candidates with over 3% of votes in the first round, by departments of Metropolitan France.

The Alpes-Maritimes, part of the Provence-Alpes-Côte d'Azur region where the National Front won several cities in the 1990s (Toulon of the Var, Marignane of the Bouches-du-Rhône and Orange of the Vaucluse) voted for Sarkozy at 43.6%, while Royal received only 17.9%, Bayrou 15.0%, and Jean-Marie Le Pen 13.5%. The Vaucluse department gave 32.8% of its votes to Sarkozy, 20.9% to Royal, 16.8% to Le Pen and 15.5% to Bayrou.

The Vendée voted 29.7% for Sarkozy, 21.7% for Royal, 20.8% for Bayrou, and 11.3% for Philippe de Villiers, deputy of the department. Le Pen. meanwhile, managed only 6.5%.

Le Pen's highest departmental tallies occurred in Aisne (17.3%) and Haute-Marne (17%). Other departments to give him more than 15% were the Vaucluse (16.8%), Haute-Saône (16.5%), Meuse (16.3%), Ardennes (16.2% – where left-wing candidate Besancenot received 5.35%), Pas-de-Calais (16%), Oise (15.9%), Corse-du-Sud (15.9%), Vosges (15.7%), and Gard (15.4%),

Departments where Besancenot obtained more than 5% of the vote include Ardennes, Aisne (where Le Pen also achieved a strong results), Ariège, Allier (where Sarkozy obtained 28% against nearly 26% for Royal), Calvados (where Sarkozy finished first with 29% to 25% for Royal), Finistère, Cher, Côtes d'Armor, Creuse, Indre, Meurthe-et-Moselle, Nord, Meuse, Moselle, Pas-de-Calais (6.2%), Sarthe, Nièvre, Puy-de-Dôme, Somme, Territoire-de-Belfort, Seine-Maritime, Haute-Vienne and the overseas collectivity of Saint Pierre and Miquelon (6.5%, along with 5.1% for José Bové; only 6.7% for Le Pen).

The overseas department of Martinique has been strongly opposed to Sarkozy; Aimé Césaire, mayor of Fort-de-France and leader of the Négritude movement, refused to see him during his visit there in December 2005 (due to the UMP vote of the 2005 law on colonialism). In the first round, it heavily supported Royal (48.5%, against 33.8% for Sarkozy and only 8.6% for Bayrou; the next highest total was received by Besancenot, with 2.5%). Réunion also strongly supported Royal (46.2%, to 25% for Sarkozy and 13% for Bayrou). Meanwhile, Sarkozy won in New Caledonia (with 49.7% of the vote) and in Guadeloupe (with 42.6%, against 38.3% for Royal), as well as in French Guiana and the overseas territories of French Polynesia and Wallis and Futuna.

=== Demographic breakdown of the first-round vote ===
Source: IPSOS, see Sociologie du vote du 1er tour, L'Humanité, 5 May 2007.

30% of men voted for Sarkozy, 24% of them for Royal. 32% of women voted Sarkozy, 27% Royal. 29% of 18- to 24-year-olds voted Royal, against 26% for Sarkozy. Sarkozy also made a higher score for 35- to 44-year-olds and 60- to 69-year-olds, but a lesser score in the 45- to 59-year-old category.

36% of farmers voted Sarkozy against 8% for Royal. Workers voted at similar levels for both Sarkozy and Royal (21% for each), while public servants voted at 34% for Royal (18% for Sarkozy). 19% of unemployed people voted for Sarkozy, 32% of them for Royal. Students also voted in majority for Royal (32% against 21%), while pensioned elders voted at 41% for Sarkozy (23% for Royal).

=== Second round ===
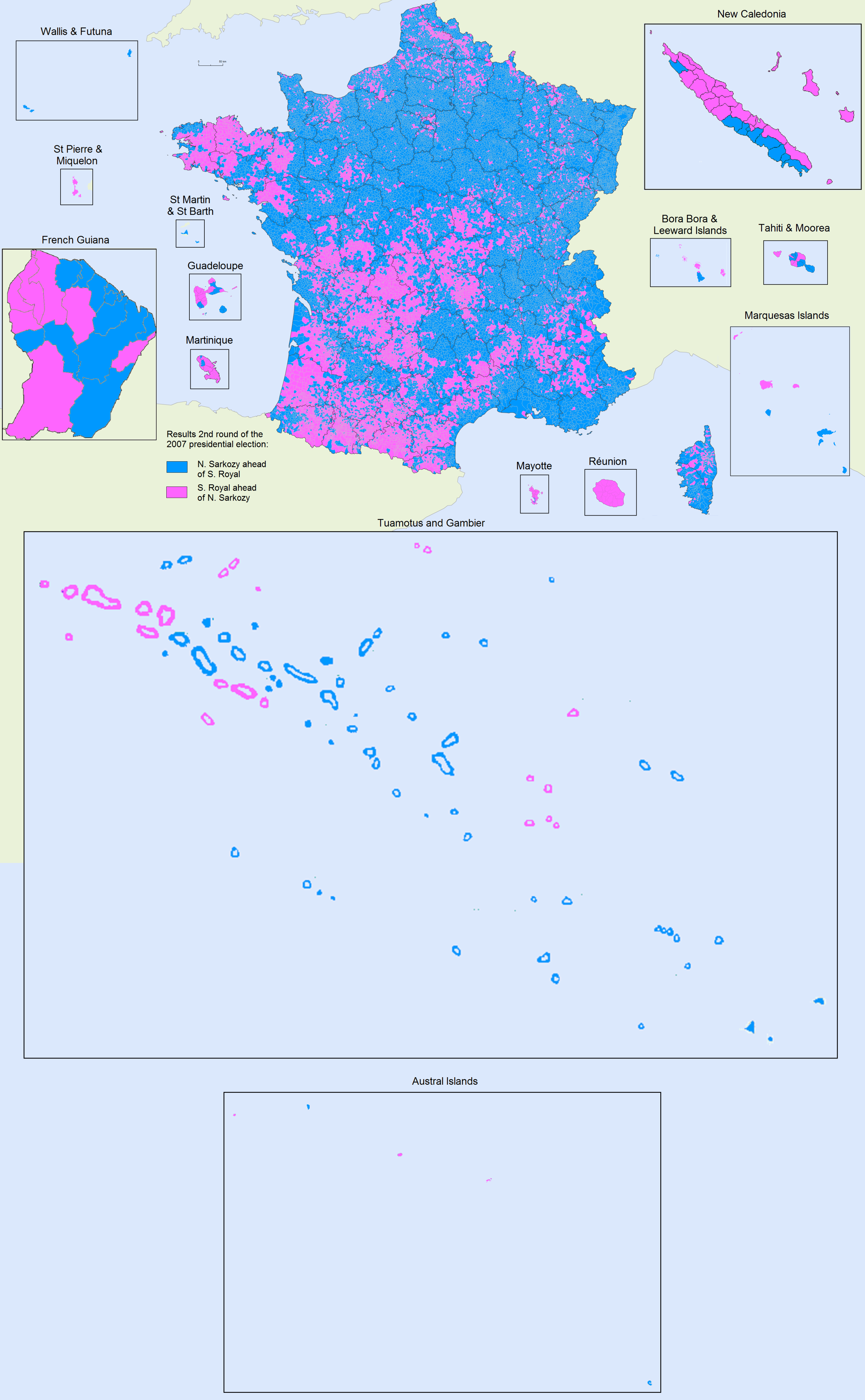
Results of the second round: the candidate with the majority of votes in each of the 36,784 communes of France. Nicolas Sarkozy: blue; Ségolène Royal: pink. All territories are shown at the same geographic scale.

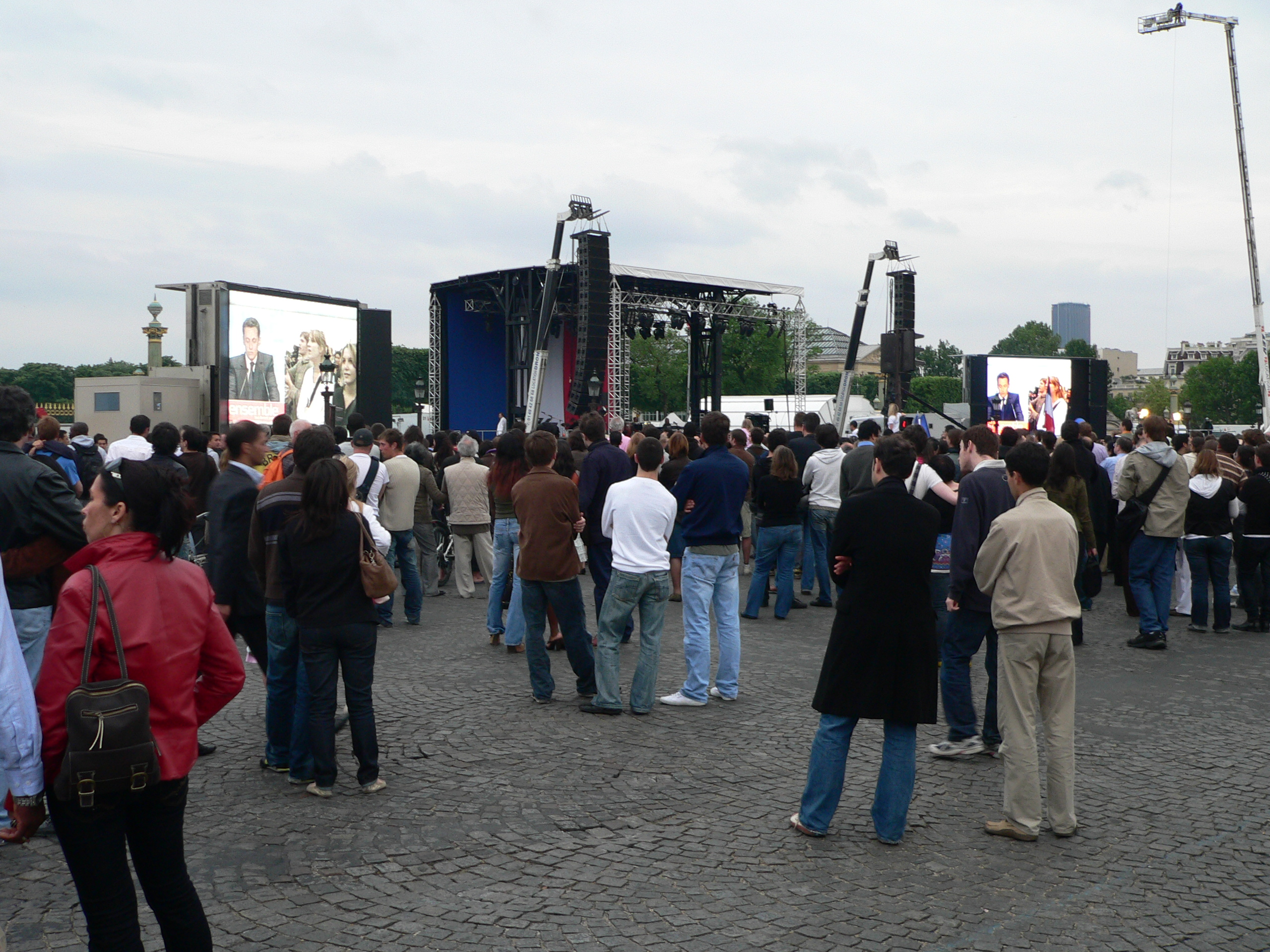
Nicolas Sarkozy supporters celebrate on the Place de la Concorde in Paris

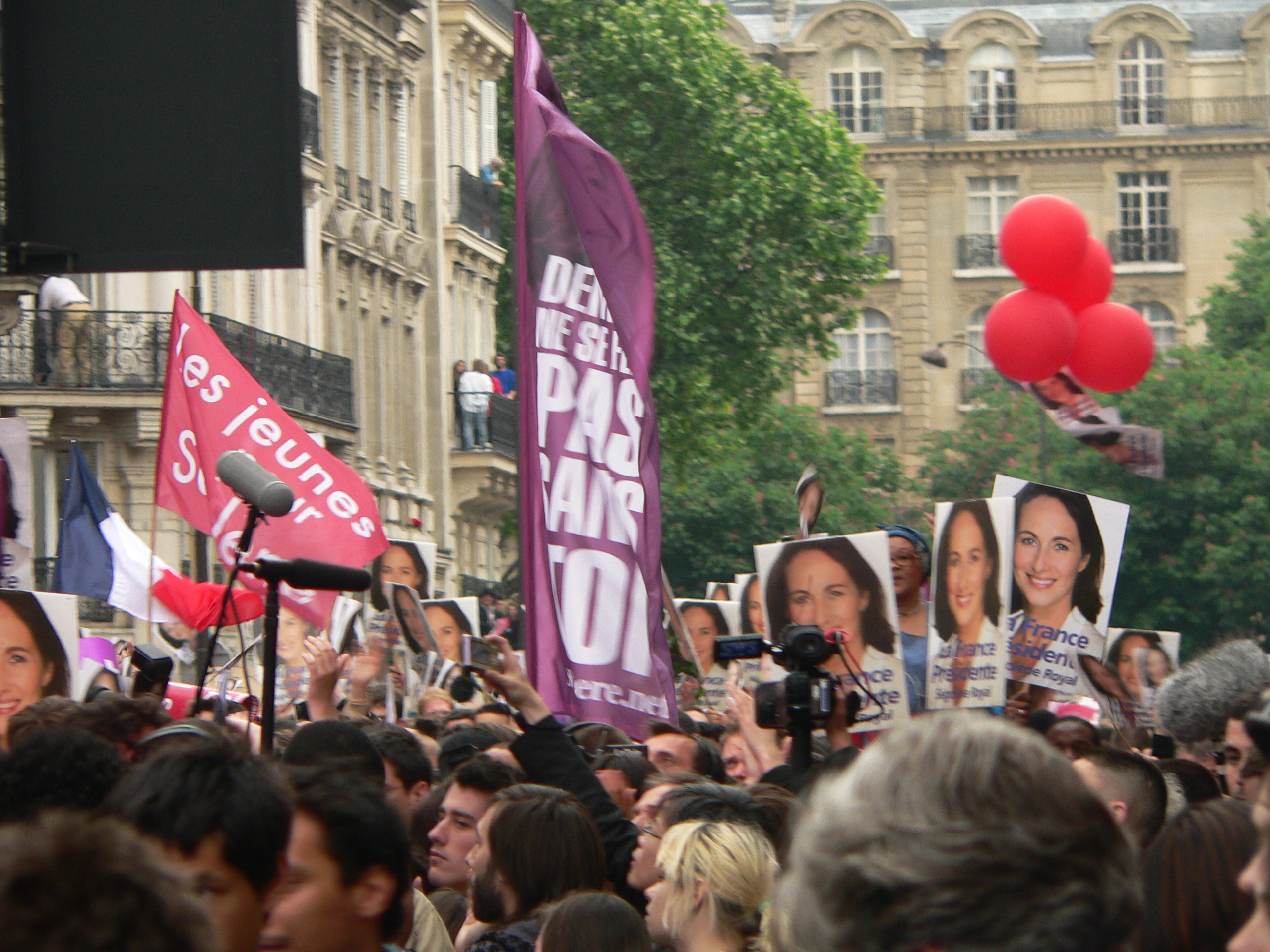
Supporters of Ségolène Royal awaiting the results, 8 pm, in front of the headquarters of the Socialist Party in Paris

The second round of the 2007 French presidential election started in Saint Pierre and Miquelon on Saturday 5 May 2007 at 8 am local time (2007-05-05 10:00 UTC) and ended in the large cities of Metropolitan France on Sunday, 6 May 2007 at 8 pm local time (2007-05-06 18:00 UTC). Turnout in the second round of the election was 84.0%, higher than in the first round. Nicolas Sarkozy got 53.06% of the votes and Ségolène Royal got 46.94%.

The left-right division was reinforced, according to many observers, by the election of Nicolas Sarkozy. 91% of the electors self-identifying as members of the centre-left voted for Royal, and 92% of those who self-identified as centre-right voted for Sarkozy. The center thus appears to have been polarized. The vast majority of the dissident left also voted for Royal, while the extreme right strongly supported Sarkozy. Although Jacques Chirac was successful among young electors in 1995, mostly owing to his discourse on the "social rupture" (fracture sociale), Sarkozy's electorate was more traditionally right-wing and focused on older people. The only age group that gave him a majority was the over-50, who accounted for 52% of his voters, compared to only 37% of Royal's. Sarkozy obtained only 40% among those 18–24 years old, while Chirac had obtained 55% in the same category in 1995.

In social categories, Sarkozy won majorities among pensioned and inactive elders (58%), business leaders, shopkeepers and craftworkers (82%), categories which are traditionally conservative. Sarkozy lost votes, compared to Chirac, among workers (59% for Royal) and employees (57% for Royal).

The general electoral geography did not significantly change from the first Chirac election. However, Sarkozy received a lesser score in Corrèze, Chirac's home department, and bettered Chirac's score in the North-East, where Le Pen had obtained some of his better scores in 2002. Overall, the increase in votes for Sarkozy between the two rounds occurred mostly in departments where the National Front's presence is strong.

Spoilt votes represented 4.2% of the electors (as much as in 2002 and 1995).

==== By department ====
Department	Nicolas Sarkozy	Ségolène Royal	Electorate	Votes	Valid votes	Invalid votes
Paris	511,920	508,082	1,222,231	1,055,532	1,020,002	35,530
Seine-et-Marne	367,080	285,492	801,895	680,359	652,572	27,787
Yvelines	435,014	305,909	893,701	770,145	740,923	29,222
Essonne	319,170	293,652	743,090	638,434	612,822	25,612
Hauts-de-Seine	416,666	332,096	905,058	777,472	748,762	28,710
Seine-Saint-Denis	245,337	319,205	708,163	583,909	564,542	19,367
Val-de Marne	302,513	304,978	746,130	630,817	607,491	23,326
Val-de Oise	288,062	262,693	675,274	572,186	550,755	21,431
Ardennes	84,607	73,442	199,104	165,433	158,049	7,384
Aube	101,291	62,885	204,735	171,773	164,176	7,597
Marne	177,028	121,988	382,293	313,648	299,016	14,632
Haute-Marne	66,782	46,134	142,345	118,995	112,916	6,079
Aisne	161,670	141,338	377,467	317,396	303,008	14,388
Oise	252,728	180,890	536,646	453,307	433,618	19,689
Somme	168,317	165,280	410,186	349,066	333,597	15,469
Eure	188,416	139,980	403,691	343,416	328,396	15,020
Seine-Maritime	354,988	352,174	873,623	738,271	707,162	31,109
Cher	94,447	89,323	232,240	193,636	183,770	9,866
Eure-et-Loir	138,452	99,601	293,844	249,003	238,053	10,950
Indre	71,321	71,818	177,331	151,359	143,139	8,220
Indre-et-Loire	174,646	156,774	401,748	346,227	331,420	14,807
Loir-et-Cher	109,232	86,101	240,584	205,510	195,333	10,177
Loiret	207,861	147,160	435,575	371,776	355,021	16,755
Calvados	203,583	194,026	482,675	414,393	397,609	16,784
Manche	171,038	133,482	371,790	318,603	304,520	14,083
Orne	101,634	74,641	216,339	184,475	176,275	8,200
Côte-d'Or	162,217	126,760	349,541	302,194	288,977	13,217
Nièvre	64,308	72,258	169,340	143,168	136,566	6,602
Saône-et-Loire	173,844	154,206	408,850	344,817	328,050	16,767
Yonne	115,458	81,254	245,501	206,567	196,712	9,855
Nord	721,506	672,679	1,776,605	1,456,277	1,394,185	62,092
Pas-de-Calais	410,398	445,273	1,078,402	897,261	855,671	41,590
Meurthe-et-Moselle	199,441	190,727	490,176	407,928	390,168	17,760
Meuse	64,701	48,951	141,227	119,369	113,652	5,717
Moselle	325,371	249,859	738,923	602,730	575,230	27,500
Vosges	125,734	104,024	288,654	243,164	229,758	13,406
Bas-Rhin	376,567	197,650	717,570	599,690	574,217	25,473
Haut-Rhin	264,757	140,131	506,854	424,033	404,888	19,145
Doubs	162,972	129,107	353,154	306,240	292,079	14,161
Jura	84,605	69,180	187,165	161,792	153,785	8,007
Haute-Saône	81,919	64,898	179,409	155,319	146,817	8,502
Territoire de Belfort	41,660	34,307	93,766	80,166	75,967	4,199
Loire-Atlantique	349,366	391,655	892,230	771,863	741,021	30,842
Maine-et-Loire	242,330	205,221	540,056	469,527	447,551	21,976
Mayenne	100,844	81,013	219,951	190,472	181,857	8,615
Sarthe	162,465	159,735	401,318	338,321	322,200	16,121
Vendée	220,680	166,060	464,228	405,307	386,740	18,567
Côtes-d'Armor	168,622	210,577	445,750	394,042	379,199	14,843
Finistère	258,614	301,826	667,354	582,964	560,440	22,524
Ille-et-Vilaine	265,929	292,606	665,677	582,202	558,535	23,667
Morbihan	228,053	218,085	534,904	465,991	446,138	19,853
Charente	100,357	112,632	259,795	222,344	212,989	9,355
Charente Maritime	193,372	179,017	453,387	388,229	372,389	15,840
Deux-Sèvres	102,474	124,204	269,097	236,020	226,678	9,342
Vienne	120,079	127,029	299,239	258,775	247,108	11,667
Dordogne	121,947	139,604	309,001	273,749	261,551	12,198
Gironde	382,366	409,550	953,649	826,882	791,916	34,966
Landes	112,211	125,638	282,988	248,153	237,849	10,304
Lot-et-Garonne	107,261	91,516	238,952	208,312	198,777	9,535
Pyrénées-Atlantiques	186,013	205,499	475,022	411,927	391,512	20,415
Ariège	38,449	56,628	113,782	99,563	95,077	4,486
Aveyron	93,433	90,382	217,855	192,585	183,815	8,770
Haute-Garonne	299,062	357,825	789,412	684,392	656,887	27,505
Gers	56,457	62,421	140,283	124,572	118,878	5,694
Lot	49,380	63,959	132,881	118,603	113,339	5,264
Hautes-Pyrénées	62,127	83,596	176,248	152,606	145,723	6,883
Tarn	114,518	117,836	276,335	243,815	232,354	11,461
Tarn-et-Garonne	73,925	65,547	165,795	145,708	139,472	6,236
Corrèze	73,548	82,909	187,179	164,528	156,457	8,071
Creuse	37,775	43,043	99,791	84,757	80,818	3,939
Haute-Vienne	96,295	123,518	265,881	232,072	219,813	12,259
Ain	185,174	120,679	372,951	319,523	305,853	13,670
Ardèche	100,414	94,121	235,544	203,934	194,535	9,399
Drôme	152,482	125,384	338,120	290,776	277,866	12,910
Isère	335,314	308,072	784,163	671,093	643,386	27,707
Loire	221,648	185,421	505,913	426,888	407,069	19,819
Rhône	485,628	364,978	1,037,922	884,920	850,606	34,314
Savoie	134,304	99,987	288,079	245,194	234,291	10,903
Haute-Savoie	241,466	141,582	472,858	400,243	383,048	17,195
Allier	102,426	107,442	259,503	220,677	209,868	10,809
Cantal	56,981	45,208	123,322	106,618	102,189	4,429
Haute-Loire	77,086	65,085	173,262	149,885	142,171	7,714
Puy-de-Dôme	168,859	197,915	443,310	384,474	366,774	17,700
Aude	101,128	109,195	254,384	220,228	210,323	9,905
Gard	226,132	176,806	488,820	421,299	402,938	18,361
Hérault	311,465	265,066	699,652	600,184	576,531	23,653
Lozère	28,100	22,307	59,991	52,838	50,407	2,431
Pyrénées-Orientales	143,043	113,784	314,805	267,988	256,827	11,161
Alpes-de-Haute-Provence	52,684	46,360	118,928	103,788	99,044	4,744
Haute Alpes	45,951	39,668	103,043	89,694	85,619	4,075
Alpes-Maritimes	399,120	187,169	721,912	606,764	586,289	20,475
Bouches-du-Rhône	597,318	431,992	1,260,808	1,069,368	1,029,310	40,058
Var	382,344	201,069	716,810	606,058	583,413	22,645
Vaucluse	184,714	119,516	370,704	318,223	304,230	13,993
Corse-du-Sud	43,844	27,249	94,554	73,997	71,093	2,904
Haute-Corse	49,927	34,960	111,875	88,224	84,887	3,337
Guadeloupe	92,387	95,510	303,222	198,537	187,897	10,640
Martinique	70,796	108,522	287,518	189,125	179,318	9,807
French Guiana	20,311	17,954	62,727	39,810	38,265	1,545
Réunion	138,807	242,231	511,033	394,482	381,038	13,444
Sainte Pierre and Miquelon	1,378	2,143	4,923	3,683	3,521	162
Mayotte	11,829	17,775	64,476	30,663	29,604	1,059
Wallis and Futuna	3,866	3,840	11,163	7,758	7,706	52
French Polynesia	64,055	59,374	167,577	125,138	123,429	1,709
New Caledonia	61,331	36,057	146,007	99,483	97,388	2,095
Source: European Election Database

==== By region ====
Region	Nicolas Sarkozy	Ségolène Royal	Electorate	Votes	Valid votes	Invalid votes
Île-de-France	2,885,762	2,612,107	6,695,542	5,708,854	5,497,869	210,985
Champagne-Ardenne	429,708	304,449	928,477	769,849	734,157	35,692
Picardy	582,715	487,508	1,324,299	1,119,769	1,070,223	49,546
Upper Normandy	543,404	492,154	1,277,314	1,081,687	1,035,558	46,129
Centre	795,959	650,777	1,781,322	1,517,511	1,446,736	70,775
Lower Normandy	476,255	402,149	1,070,804	917,471	878,404	39,067
Burgundy	515,827	434,478	1,173,232	996,746	950,305	46,441
Nord-Pas-de-Calais	1,131,904	1,117,952	2,855,007	2,353,538	2,249,856	103,682
Lorraine	715,247	593,561	1,658,980	1,373,191	1,308,808	64,383
Alsace	641,324	337,781	1,224,424	1,023,723	979,105	44,618
Franche-Comté	371,156	297,492	813,494	703,517	668,648	34,869
Pays de la Loire	1,075,685	1,003,684	2,517,783	2,175,490	2,079,369	96,121
Brittany	921,218	1,023,094	2,313,685	2,025,199	1,944,312	80,887
Poitou-Charentes	516,282	542,882	1,281,518	1,105,368	1,059,164	46,204
Aquitaine	909,798	971,807	2,259,612	1,969,023	1,881,605	87,418
Midi-Pyrénées	787,351	898,194	2,012,591	1,761,844	1,685,545	76,299
Limousin	207,618	249,470	552,851	481,357	457,088	24,269
Rhône-Alpes	1,856,430	1,440,224	4,035,550	3,442,571	3,296,654	145,917
Auvergne	405,352	415,650	999,397	861,654	821,002	40,652
Languedoc-Roussillon	809,868	687,158	1,817,652	1,562,537	1,497,026	65,511
Provence-Alpes-Côte d'Azur	1,662,131	1,025,774	3,292,205	2,793,895	2,687,905	105,990
Corsica	93,771	62,209	206,429	162,221	155,980	6,241
Guadeloupe	92,387	95,510	303,222	198,537	187,897	10,640
Martinique	70,796	108,522	287,518	189,125	179,318	9,807
French Guiana	20,311	17,954	62,727	39,810	38,265	1,545
Réunion	138,807	242,231	511,033	394,482	381,038	13,444
Saint Pierre and Miquelon	1,378	2,143	4,923	3,683	3,521	162
Mayotte	11,829	17,775	64,476	30,663	29,604	1,059
Wallis and Futuna	3,866	3,840	11,163	7,758	7,706	52
French Polynesia	64,055	59,374	167,577	125,138	123,429	1,709
New Caledonia	61,331	36,057	146,007	99,483	97,388	2,095
Source: European Election Database

=== Abstention and spoilt votes ===
Abstention was exceptionally low, as well as protest votes. Blank vote (going to vote, but deliberately cancelling one's ballot, by any means possible – tearing it in two, writing Tintin on it, or anything absurd as such) is not included in official counts – i.e. it is considered a spoilt vote, counted as equivalent to abstention. A very small party, the Parti Blanc (White Party, for "white vote", i.e. blank vote) called for the official count of white votes by the state (as in None of the above systems). It organised a march in Paris on Wednesday 18 March 2007 in which only thirty people participated.

== Aftermath ==
=== Riots ===
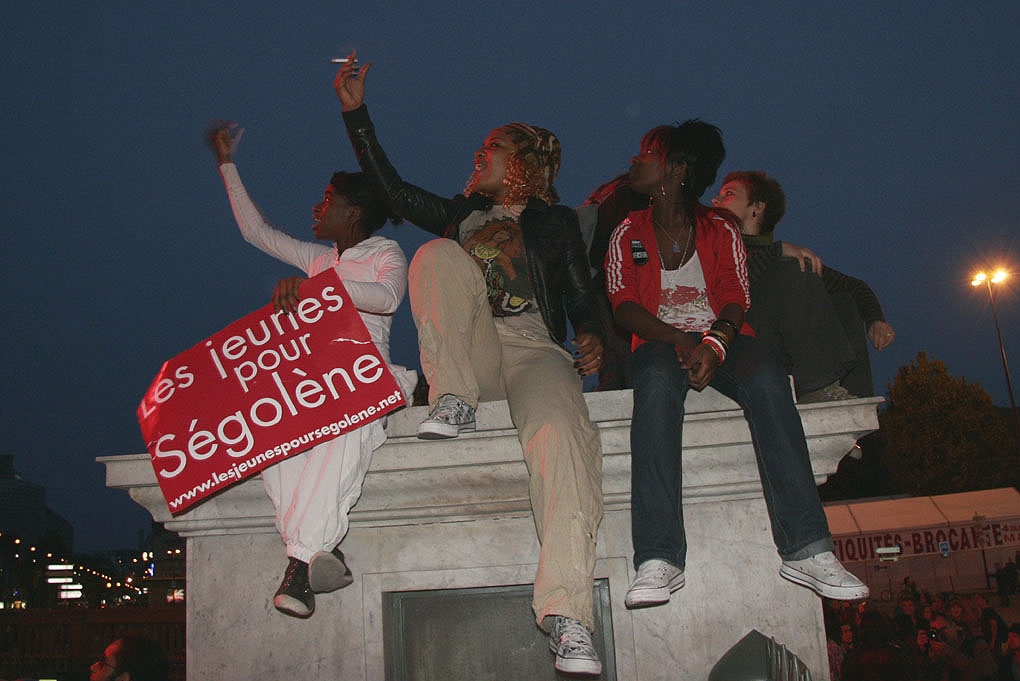
Pro-Ségolène Royal youth chanted against Nicolas Sarkozy

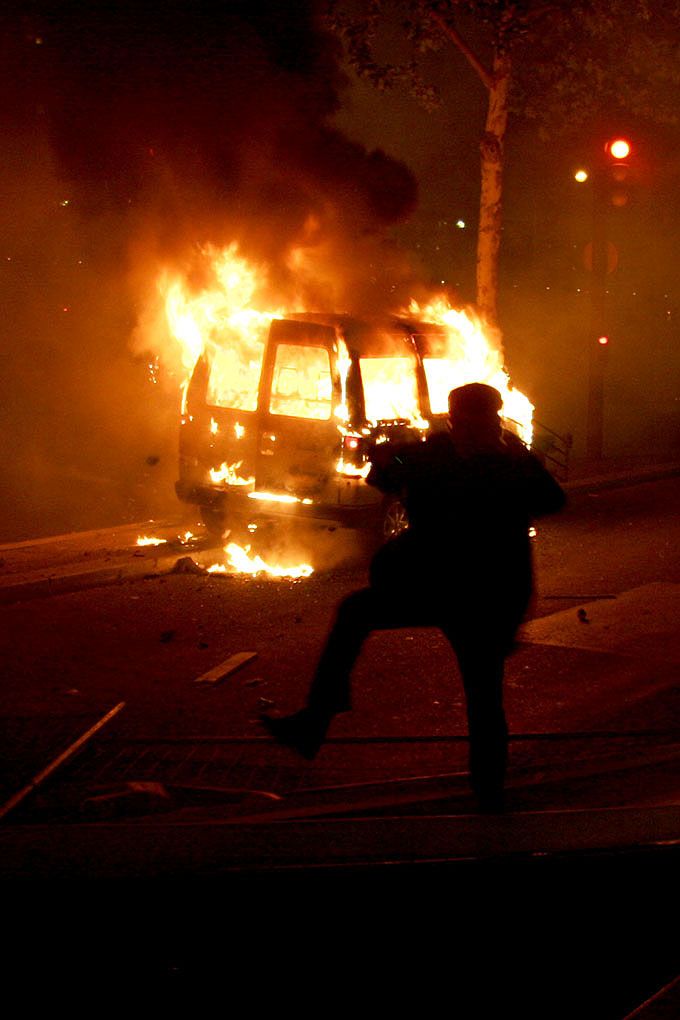
A gathering of opponents to Sarkozy on Place de la Bastille in Paris, on 6 May evening, quickly ended in confrontations between the far-left and the riot control forces

Bastille tear-gassed

Thousands of youths took to the streets Sunday night following the final presidential election results. While many simply expressed their discontent at the election of Nicolas Sarkozy, others chose to engage in violent action. Riots erupted in several urban centers including the capital Paris where some of the most intense clashes were reported in the Place de la Bastille. A gathering of opponents to Sarkozy there quickly ended in confrontations between the youth and the riot control forces, who tear gassed the whole place.

732 cars were torched according to estimates of the DGPN (direction of the police) and government buildings and property came under attack. Police clashed with protesters who were described by French media as members of the ultra-left and of the autonome movement or youth from the suburbs. During the fighting dozens of officers were injured and 592 alleged rioters were arrested. 70 people were arrested in the North department and 79 in Paris. Overall the situation remained calm.

Some clashes continued on the night of Monday to Tuesday, with 365 torched cars and 160 alleged rioters detained by the police. Ten people were in court already by Monday. Two of them were given firm prison sentences of six and three months respectively, and two others to 120 hours of TIG (General Interest Labour, an alternative sentence to prison). Another one has been given a two-month firm prison sentence and two others TIG hours. Some of the people judged in Lyon have denied any involvement in the riots (two of them received 120 hours of TIG and a 200 euros fine).

300 to 400 people demonstrated on the Boulevard Saint-Michel on Wednesday 9 May, in opposition to a demonstration of white supremacists. By 9 pm that night 118 of them had been arrested. A 31-year-old engineer took legal action following his release from custody claiming he had been a victim of police brutality. He claimed that he had not taken part to the demonstrations, but had been arrested nonetheless.

=== Sarkozy's detention March 2018 ===
On 20 March 2018, Sarkozy was arrested by the French Police because of the suspect having received 50 million euros for his presidential campaign from Muammar Gaddafi.

== See also ==
- President of France
- Politics of France
- French presidential elections under the Fifth Republic
- Alleged Libyan interference in the 2007 French elections
- 2007 French legislative election
