= Popular Party for French Democracy =

Political party in France

The Popular Party for French Democracy (French: Parti populaire pour la démocratie française, PPDF) was a centrist-liberal political party in France led by Hervé de Charette.

The PPDF was the continuation of the Perspectives and Realities Clubs, a parallel organisation of the Independent Republicans and, later, the Republican Party (PR) within the centre-right Union for French Democracy (UDF), a confederation of parties formed to counterbalance the neo-Gaullist Rally for the Republic (RPR) in 1978. The Clubs were launched in 1965 under the auspices of Valéry Giscard d'Estaing, president of France from 1974 to 1981 and president of the UDF from 1988 to 1996. While the Clubs were a sort of think tank formed mainly by PR members, the PPDF was a full-fledged party formed by Giscard's supporters when the PR traced a different political line from its founder.

The party was launched in July 1995 and became a new component of the UDF, along with the PR, Democratic Force (FD) – successor of the Centre of Social Democrats and the minor Social Democratic Party – and the Radical Party. Indeed, in the first round of the 1995 presidential election, most UDF members had supported incumbent Prime Minister Édouard Balladur, against the instruction of Giscard who had called to vote for the other RPR candidate Jacques Chirac, who went on to win. The PPDF was created to organise Giscard's faithfuls within the UDF, most of whom hailed from the PR. They included Hervé de Charette, Jean-Pierre Fourcade, Pierre Albertini, Dominique Bussereau, Robert Hersant, Françoise Hostalier, Jean-François Humbert, Jean-François Mattéi, Jean-Marc Nesme and Jean-Pierre Raffarin. De Charette was elected president of the new party, while Albertini, Humbert and Nesme were appointed general secretaries.

Nevertheless, the foundation of the PPDF could not prevent the departure of Giscard from the presidency of the UDF in 1996. François Léotard, a Republican and a former balladurien, was elected new UDF leader by defeating Alain Madelin, who was also a Republican, but had supported Chirac. After the defeat of the RPR–UDF front in the 1997 legislative election, the UDF faced a major crisis. In that context, while the Christian democrats of FD aimed at strengthening the centrist nature of the party, the conservative liberals tried to overcome the fracture between chiraquiens and balladuriens. The PR was thus joined by some politicians from the PPDF, such as Bussereau, Mattei and Raffarin, and was renamed Liberal Democracy (DL), under Madelin's leadership.

In 1998 the PPDF participated in the transformation of the UDF into the so-called nouvelle UDF (new UDF), that is from a confederation to a united party. The transformation was led by FD leader François Bayrou, who was keen to fully merge his party into the new UDF, which granted some autonomy only to the PPDF and the Radical Party. DL decided to opt out.

In 2002 the PPDF left the UDF and joined the Union for a Popular Movement (UMP), the new party formed by the merger of the RPR, DL and most of the UDF, not including the party's core around Bayrou which remained autonomous. Within the UMP, the PPDF became a faction and adopted the new name Democratic Convention.
