= Perspectives and Realities Clubs =

The National Federation of Perspectives and Realities Clubs (French: Fédération Nationale des Clubs Perspectives et Réalités), mostly known simply as Perspectives and Realities Clubs (CPR), was a liberal political association in France. It was a parallel organisation of Valéry Giscard d'Estaing's Independent Republicans and, later, the Republican Party.

After the creation of the first club in Paris in 1965, Michel Poniatowski, Jean-Pierre Fourcade, Jacques Dominati and others launched the national federation the following year, in parallel with the structuring of the Independent Republicans. Indeed, in January 1966, Giscard was not re-appointed as Minister of Finance and Economic Affairs and decided to structure the Gaullist wing of the National Centre of Independents and Peasants, which had grouped itself within the parliamentary group of the Independent Republicans in 1962, into a political party, by creating regional committees and a national federation. At the same time, he encouraged the creation of the CPR network, a non-partisan organisation, in order to open the new party to civil society and serve as a "doctrine laboratory", sort of think tank, and "pool" of future party activists and executives. The Clubs were thus entrusted with the preparation of a programmatic platform.

In 1978 the Clubs actively participated in the founding of the Union for French Democracy (UDF), along with the Republican Party, the Centre of Social Democrats, the Radical Party and the Social Democratic Party. The Clubs offered a transversal structure, not attached to one of the constituent parties, even though the majority of its members were Republican affiliates.

In the first round of the 1995 presidential election, most UDF members supported incumbent Prime Minister Édouard Balladur, against the instruction of Giscard who had called to vote for the other Rally for the Republic (RPR) candidate Jacques Chirac, who went on to win. As a result, in July, the Clubs broke away from the Republican Party and, in order to organise Giscard's faithfuls within the UDF, became the Popular Party for French Democracy (PPDF), a new component of the UDF. In the occasion, Hervé de Charette took over as president.
