= Independent Republican and Liberal Pole =

Political party (France)

The Independent Republican and Liberal Pole (French: Pôle républicain indépendant et libéral, PRIL) was a liberal-centrist political party in France.

The PRIL was founded in 1998 by members of Liberal Democracy (DL) who refused to leave the Union for French Democracy (UDF), as proposed by Alain Madelin. They included François Léotard, Gilles de Robien, Gérard Longuet, Jean-Pierre Fourcade, Alain Lamassoure, Renaud Donnedieu de Vabres, François Sauvadet, Bernard Lehideux and Rudy Salles.

PRIL merged with Democratic Force (itself a merger of the Centre of Social Democrats and the Social Democratic Party in 1995) and the so-called "Direct Adherents" to the New UDF, structured as a single party.

Some of them (Jean-Pierre Fourcade, Alain Lamassoure, Renaud Donnedieu de Vabres) joined the Union for a Popular Movement (UMP) in 2002, while others, including Gilles de Robien, represented the most pro-UMP and pro-Sarkozy faction within UDF, being also strong opponents of François Bayrou.
