= Democratic and Social Centre =

Democratic and Social Centre may refer to:

- Democratic and Social Center - People's Party (Portuguese: Centro Democrático e Social - Partido Popular), a Portuguese centre-right political party, with an ideological foundation on Christian democracy, Conservatism and Classical liberalism, founded on 19 July 1974.
- Centre of Social Democrats, a French Christian-democratic and centrist party, which existed from 1976 to 1995.
- Democratic and Social Centre (Spain), a Spanish moderate, social democratic and centrist political party, which was founded in 1982.
