= Créteil Congress =

The Créteil Congress was the eight national congress of the French Socialist Party (Parti socialiste or PS). It took place on 24 January 1981. François Mitterrand was unanimously approved as the party's candidate in the 1981 presidential election, which he eventually won.

Lionel Jospin was elected as First Secretary.
