= Union for French Democracy =

Union for French Democracy Union pour la démocratie française
- Abbreviation: UDF
- Leaders: Valéry Giscard d'Estaing; Raymond Barre; Jean Lecanuet; François Léotard; François Bayrou
- Founder: Valéry Giscard d'Estaing
- Founded: 1 February 1978 (alliance); 29 November 1998 (party)
- Dissolved: 30 November 2007 (de facto) (Note: MoDem assumed UDF's political activity on 1 December 2007 and the latter is no longer active, but its brand remains in the electoral register and the party has not been legally dissolved.)
- Merger of: Democratic Force; Independent Republican and Liberal Pole
- Succeeded by: Democratic Movement
- Headquarters: UDF 133 bis, rue de l'Université 75007 Paris
- Ideology: Liberalism; Christian democracy
- Political position: Centre-right
- European affiliation: EPP (1994–2004); EDP (2004–07)
- European Parliament group: LDR (PR and others 1979–94); EPP-ED (CDS and others 1979–94, UDF 1994–2004); ALDE (2004–07)
- International affiliation: None
- Colours: Blue (official) (1978–2004); Cyan (customary) (1978–2004); Orange (2004–2007)

Website
- www.udf.org (inactive)

The Union for French Democracy (French: Union pour la démocratie française [ynjɔ̃ puʁ la demɔkʁasi fʁɑ̃sɛːz]; UDF) was a centre-right political party in France. The UDF was founded in 1978 as an electoral alliance to support President Valéry Giscard d'Estaing in order to counterbalance the Gaullist preponderance over the French centre-right. The UDF took its name from Giscard's 1976 book, Démocratie française.

The founding parties of the UDF were Giscard's Republican Party (PR), the Centre of Social Democrats (CDS), the Radical Party (Rad), the Social Democratic Party (PSD) and the Perspectives and Realities Clubs (CPR). The UDF was most frequently a junior partner in coalitions with the neo-Gaullist Rally for the Republic (RPR). In 1998 the UDF became a single entity, causing the defection of Liberal Democracy (DL), PR's successor. In 2002 the RPR, DL and most of the remaining UDF members joined the Union for a Popular Movement (UMP), which aimed to unite the entire centre-right. The UDF effectively ceased to exist by the end of 2007 and its membership and assets were transferred to its successor, the Democratic Movement (MoDem). The UDF's last president and MoDem's founding leader was François Bayrou.

== History ==
=== Foundation and early years ===
In the 1974 presidential election, defying expectations, Valéry Giscard d'Estaing, leader of the Independent Republicans, was elected President of France by overcoming Jacques Chaban-Delmas of the Union of Democrats for the Republic (UDR), the largest centre-right party, in the first round and defeating François Mitterrand in the run-off. Two years later, Prime Minister Jacques Chirac (UDR) resigned and launched the Rally for the Republic (RPR), in order to restore the Gaullist domination over the centre-right. The RPR would represent the right wing of the presidential majority and would criticise with virulence the policies put forward by President Giscard and Prime Minister Raymond Barre.

In the run-up of the 1978 legislative election, during a speech in Verdun-sur-le-Doubs, Giscard noted that the political leanings of the French people were divided among four groups: the Communist Party (PCF), the Socialist Party (PS), the neo-Gaullist RPR and his own camp, which lacked a cohesive representation. Therefore, he sought to formally organise the centrist side of the presidential majority through the UDF. It consisted of the conservative-liberal Republican Party (PR) – the evolution of Giscard's Independent Republicans –, the Christian-democratic Centre of Social Democrats (CDS), the liberal Radical Party (Rad), the Social Democratic Party (PSD) and the Perspectives and Realities Clubs (CPR). Contrary to the RPR, the UDF advocated less market interventionism by the state, decentralisation and support of local authorities, and a strong commitment towards the building of a federal Europe. According to historian René Rémond, the UDF descended from the Orleanist tradition of the right, whereas the RPR was a reincarnation of the Bonapartist tradition, which promoted national independence by virtue of a strong state.

After the centre-right won the 1978 legislative election and the subsequent focus of both the RPR and the UDF toward the 1981 presidential election, their relations deteriorated. Especially, RPR leader Chirac criticised the market-oriented and pro-European policies of Giscard and Barre. In the run-up of the 1979 European Parliament election, Chirac published the Call of Cochin where the UDF was accused of being "the party of foreigners". Since the UDF list, led by Simone Veil, obtained 27.1% of the vote compared with RPR's 16.3%, the quarrels between the two parties and the rivalry between Giscard and Chirac contributed to the defeat of the incumbent president who ran for a second term.

=== 1980s ===
After the election of Mitterrand as president, the two centre-right parties reconciled. Gradually, the RPR abandoned Gaullist doctrine and joined the market-oriented and pro-European positions of the UDF. Although they presented a common list at the 1984 European Parliament election, their leaders Chirac and Barre still competed for the leadership of the French centre-right. Focused on winning the 1986 legislative election, Chirac, unlike Barre, accepted the principle of "cohabitation" with President Mitterrand. Furthermore, some UDF politicians (notably from the PR) covertly supported Chirac. Consequently, he served as Prime Minister from 1986 to 1988 and the UDF played a supporting role in his government.

Barre was a candidate in the 1988 presidential election, yet, despite his popularity, he was not supported by all UDF leaders. Giscard himself refused to choose clearly and publicly between his two former Prime Ministers. Eliminated in the first round, Barre called on his supporters to vote for Chirac in the second round, but despite this, Chirac was defeated by Mitterrand. After the re-election of Mitterrand, some UDF members participated as ministers in the centre-left governments led by Prime Minister Michel Rocard.

Also in 1988 Giscard retook the leadership of the UDF. However, his authority and that of the other centre-right leaders (Chirac, Barre etc.) were contested by a new generation of politicians called the "renovation men", who accused the old guard leadership of bearing responsibility for the successive electoral defeats. However, Giscard would give the party a more consistent centre-right approach, that would culminate in the entire UDF joining the European People's Party (EPP), which had been previously home only of the Christian-democratic CDS, in 1994.

=== 1990s ===
With the dismissal of Rocard in 1991 there were no longer UDF ministers from the government, thus RPR and the UDF were allied in opposition to the subsequent Socialist governments which were weakened by economic crisis, scandals and internal quarrels. The RPR–UDF coalition named "Union for France" comfortably won the 1993 legislative election and obtained a massive majority in the National Assembly. The new Prime Minister Édouard Balladur, who hailed from the RPR, nominated a large number of UDF members to his cabinet: François Léotard (PR) became minister of Defense, Gérard Longuet (PR) of Industry, Pierre Méhaignerie (CDS) of Justice, François Bayrou (CDS) of Education, Simone Veil (PR) of Health and Social Affairs, Alain Madelin (PR) of Commerce, Bernard Bosson (CDS) of Transport, Jean Puech (CDS) of Agriculture, André Rossinot (Rad) of Civil Service and Hervé de Charette (CPR) of Housing.

In the run-up of the 1995 presidential election the different components of the UDF were unable to agree on a common candidacy and consequently they divided between the two RPR candidates. Most UDF members supported Balladur, whereas a minority endorsed Chirac, as Giscard had proposed. In the aftermath, the CDS merged with the PSD into Democratic Force (FD), while CPR members and other supporters of Giscard within the PR formed the Popular Party for French Democracy (PPDF).

After Chirac's election as president of France, some UDF ministers were dismissed as a result of their support for Balladur. Nevertheless, in Alain Juppé's cabinet, the UDF was given several ministries including Foreign Affairs with Hervé de Charette (PPDF), Defense with Charles Millon (PR), Economy and Finances with Alain Madelin (PR), Industry with Yves Galland (Rad), Education with François Bayrou (CDS/FD), Commerce with Jean-Pierre Raffarin (PR), Labour with Jacques Barrot (CDS/FD), Agriculture with Philippe Vasseur (CDS/FD), Culture with Philippe Douste-Blazy (CDS/FD), Economic Development with Jean Arthuis (PR) and Reform and Decentralization with Claude Goasguen (PR).

In 1996 François Léotard, a Republican and a former balladurien, was elected president of the UDF by defeating Alain Madelin, who was also a Republican, but had supported Chirac. After the defeat of the RPR–UDF front in the 1997 legislative election, the UDF faced a major crisis. While the centrist components had merged into FD, the conservative liberals tried to overcome the fracture between chiraquiens and balladuriens. The PR was joined by some politicians from the PPDF, such as Jean-Pierre Raffarin (a former Republican), and was renamed Liberal Democracy (DL), under Madelin's leadership. DL soon began to reassert its autonomy within the alliance and finally broke ranks with the UDF in 1998. The split was triggered by the 1998 regional elections, during which some UDF politicians were elected regional presidents with the support of the National Front: DL refused to condemn the arrangement, whilst the UDF leadership did.

=== New UDF ===
This split of DL led to a re-organisation of the UDF. The nouvelle UDF (new UDF) was transformed into a single party through the merger of FD and the Independent Republican and Liberal Pole (PRIL), formed by those DL members who refused to leave UDF. The Radicals and the PPDF remained as autonomous entities within the new party.

Former FD leader Bayrou became the natural leader of the new UDF. He conceived it as the embryo of a future centrist party which would include politicians from both the left and right. Bayrou ran for president in the 2002 presidential election, but some UDF leaders supported Chirac. The latter won re-election comfortably, with Bayrou being eliminated after the first round, having gained only 6.8% of the vote. Bayrou subsequently refused Chirac's invitation to join the newly-formed centre-right, big-tent Union for a Popular Movement (UMP) for the upcoming 2002 legislative election. Other UDF members, led by Giscard, Barrot, Douste-Blazy, Méhaignerie and Raffarin, as well as the entire PPDF and DL, joined the UMP, leaving Bayrou somewhat isolated.

After the election, the UDF, whose parliamentary seats were quite reduced, joined the victorious UMP as a partner in the government of Prime Minister Raffarin. Despite this, the UDF sometimes criticised its policies, without initially quitting the majority coalition and entering the opposition, which was made up mostly of centre-left and left-wing parties. The UDF eft the government, except for Gilles de Robien, only after a cabinet reshuffle in March 2004, but still decided to remain in the parliamentary majority coalition.

At the European level, the UDF left the EPP and formed the European Democratic Party (EDP), along with Italy's Democracy is Freedom – The Daisy. The EDP was intended to be the home to all the Christian democrats and centrists who were disillusioned by the new course of the EPP, which had welcomed the RPR and, later, the UMP. With the exit of most of its conservative, Christian-democratic and conservative-liberal components in 1998 and 2002, the UDF was thus a centrist party with socially liberal tendencies, in Bayrou's mould.

There developed a split among UDF elected officials, between those such as de Robien and Pierre-Christophe Baguet, who favored closer ties with the UMP, and those such as Bayrou who advocate independent centrist policies, while others such as Jean Dionis du Séjour tried steering for a middle course. The most likely reason for many of the UDF's elected officials favouring close ties with the UMP was that most of the UDF's elected positions were obtained through cooperative alliances with the UMP. However, the party's base overwhelmingly favored independence. At the congress of Lyon, in January 2006, 91% of the members voted to retain the independence of the UDF from the UMP and transform it into an independent centrist party. This outcome meant that the orientation of the evolving UDF would be that of a social-liberal party aiming for a balance between social-democratic and conservative policies.

=== Democratic Movement ===
In May 2006 Bayrou and other ten UDF deputies, a minority within the parliamentary party, voted for the motion of no-confidence brought forward by the Socialist-led opposition calling for the resignation of Prime Minister Dominique de Villepin's government, embroiled in the Clearstream affair. This motion had no chance of being passed, given that the UMP had an absolute majority in the National Assembly. Following this event, France's television authority started to classify Bayrou and the other UDF deputies who had voted for the motion as being in the opposition for time allocation purposes; however, after Bayrou protested, they were classified as neither majority nor opposition.

In April 2007 Bayrou announced that he would be submitting a plan to a vote by UDF members to create a new Democratic Movement (MoDem), which was finally launched in May. However, most of the UDF's deputies protested and formed the New Centre (NC) – later The Centrists –, in order to support newly-elected President Nicolas Sarkozy of the UMP. In the subsequent 2007 legislative election held in June, the MoDem won 7.6% of the vote and three seats, while the NC stopped at 2.4%, but, thanks to its alliance with the UMP, obtained 22 seats.

In November 2007 the UDF effectively ceased to exist and was fully integrated within the MoDem, headed by Bayrou.

== Ideology, positions, platform ==
The UDF was a centre-right party, although the party itself and Maurice Duverger considered that they were centrist. Broadly, the UDF was a big tent, bringing together Christian democrats, liberals, radicals, social democrats and non-Gaullist conservatives. The main ideological trends in the party were Christian democracy, liberalism, social liberalism, conservative liberalism and liberal conservatism.

The UDF's most marked political trait was pro-Europeanism and support for European integration, up to the point of turning the European Union into a federal United States of Europe. In that respect, UDF was the likely target of Chirac's Call of Cochin (1978), in which he denounced the pro-European policies of "the party of the foreigners".

Until 2002, the UDF spanned a somewhat wide ideological spectrum on the centre-right. A tongue-in-cheek characterisation of UDF's membership is that it was the union of everybody on the right that was neither far-right nor a Jacques Chirac supporter. However, the UDF suffered for its lack of cohesion, in contrast to Chirac's Rally for the Republic. Its economic policies ranged from favouring left-leaning social justice to favouring laissez-faire liberalism. Such divergences led the laissez-faire advocates, such as Alain Madelin, to form Liberal Democracy in 1997 and split from the UDF in 1998. Similarly, social policies ranged from the social conservatism of the likes of Christine Boutin, famously opposed to civil unions for homosexuals, same-sex marriage, abortion and euthanasia, to more socially progressive policies. Boutin was eventually excluded from the UDF and in 2001 she formed the Forum of Social Republicans.

During the 2007 presidential electoral campaign, François Bayrou presented himself as a centrist and a social-liberal (he even opened the door to gay adoptions), proclaiming that if elected, he would "govern beyond the left-right divide". He won 18.6% of the vote, but this was not enough for him to reach the second round.

== Factions ==
- Bayrouistes, those who wanted the UDF to be independent: Marielle de Sarnez, Jean-Louis Bourlanges, Thierry Cornillet, Gilles Artigues, Bernard Bosson, Anne-Marie Comparini, Charles de Courson, Jean-Christophe Lagarde, Jean Lassalle, Maurice Leroy, Hervé Morin, Rudy Salles, Gérard Vignoble, Nicolas Perruchot, Jean-Luc Préel, François Rochebloine, François Sauvadet
- Society in Movement, those who wanted close ties with the UMP: Gilles de Robien, Olivier Jardé, Jean-Pierre Abelin, Pierre-Christophe Baguet, Jean Dionis du Séjour, Francis Hillmeyer, Michel Hunault, Stéphane Demilly, Yvan Lachaud, André Santini, Francis Vercamer, Claude Leteurtre, Rodolphe Thomas

When Bayrou launched his new Democratic Movement in 2007, only five deputies (Gilles Artigues, Anne-Marie Comparini, Jean-Christophe Lagarde, Jean Lassalle and Gérard Vignoble) out of 29, not counting Bayrou himself, joined. The others, comprising members of Society in Movement and some Bayrouistes, as Hervé Morin and Jean-Louis Bourlanges, joined the presidential majority in support of the new President Nicolas Sarkozy and formed a new "centrist pole" within it, the New Centre.

== Composition ==
Name	Ideology	Position	Leaders
Republican Party (1978–1997)	Conservative liberalism	Centre-right	Valéry Giscard d'Estaing; Jean-Pierre Soisson; François Léotard; Gérard Longuet; François Léotard; Alain Madelin
Centre of Social Democrats (1978–1995)	Christian democracy	Centre	Jean Lecanuet; Pierre Méhaignerie; François Bayrou
Social Democratic Party (1978–1995)	Social democracy	Centre-left	Max Lejeune; André Santini
Radical Party (1978–2002)	Liberalism	Centre	Jean-Jacques Servan-Schreiber; Didier Bariani; André Rossinot; Yves Galland; Thierry Cornillet; François Loos
Perspectives and Realities Clubs / Popular Party for French Democracy (1978–2002)	Liberalism	Centre-right	Jean-Pierre Fourcade; Hervé de Charette
Democratic Force (1995–1998)	Christian democracy Social liberalism	Centre	François Bayrou
Liberal Democracy (1997–1998)	Conservative liberalism	Centre-right	Alain Madelin
Independent Republican and Liberal Pole (1997–1998)	Conservative liberalism	Centre-right	François Léotard

== Presidents ==
- Jean Lecanuet (1978–1988)
- Valéry Giscard d'Estaing (1988–1996)
- François Léotard (1996–1998)
- François Bayrou (1998–2007)

== Election results ==
=== Presidential elections ===
Election	Candidate	First round		Second round		Result
Election	Candidate	Votes	%	Votes	%	Result
1981	Valéry Giscard d'Estaing	8,222,432	28.32%	14,642,306	48.24%	Lost
1988	Raymond Barre	5,031,849	16.55%	-	-	Lost
1995	endorsed Édouard Balladur	5,658,796	18.58%	-	-	Lost
2002	François Bayrou	1,949,170	6.84%	-	-	Lost

=== Legislative elections ===
Year	Leader	First round		Second round		Seats in the National Assembly	Notes
Year	Leader	Number of votes	Percentage of votes	Number of votes	Percentage of votes	Seats in the National Assembly	Notes
1978	Jean Lecanuet (CDS)	6,128,849	21.45	5,907,603	23.18	121 / 488	Part of "Presidential Majority" (with RPR)
1981	Jean-Claude Gaudin (PR)	4,827,437	19.20	3,489,363	18.68	62 / 491	Part of "Union for a New Majority" (with RPR)
1986	Jean-Claude Gaudin (PR)	6,008,612 (RPR-UDF joint lists); 2,330,167 (separate UDF lists)	21.44; 8.31	—N/a		127 / 573	Part of "RPR-UDF Union"
1988	Jean-Claude Gaudin (PR)	4,519,459	18.50	4,299,370	21.18	129 / 575	Part of "Union of Rally and Centre" (with RPR)
1993	Valéry Giscard d'Estaing (PR)	4,731,013	18.71	5,178,039	26.14	207 / 577	Part of "Union for France" (with RPR)
1997	François Léotard (PR)	3,617,440	14.22	5,284,203	20.07	112 / 577	Part of "Presidential Majority" (with RPR)
2002	François Bayrou	1,226,462	4.86	832,785	3.92	29 / 577	Part of "Presidential Majority" (with UMP)

=== European elections ===
Election year	Leader	# of overall votes	% of overall vote	# of overall seats won	Group
1979	Simone Veil	5,588,851	27.61 (#1)	25 / 81	LD (17); EPP (8)
1984	Simone Veil	8,683,596 (UDF-RPR joint lists)	43.03 (#1; UDF+RPR)	22 / 81	LDR (12); EPP (9); EDA (1)
1989	Valéry Giscard d'Estaing (PR)	5,242,038 (UDF-RPR joint lists)	28.88 (#1; UDF+RPR)	12 / 81	LDR (11); EPP (1)
1994	Dominique Baudis (CDS)	4,985,574 (UDF-RPR joint lists)	25.58 (#1; UDF+RPR)	14 / 87	EPP (13); ELDR (1)
1999	François Bayrou	1,638,680	9.28 (#5)	9 / 87	EPP-ED
2004	François Bayrou	2,053,446	11.96 (#3)	11 / 78	ALDE

== Literature ==
- Massart, Alexis (2004). Steven Van Hecke; Emmanuel Gerard (eds.). The Impossible Resurrection: Christian Democracy in France. Leuven University Press. pp. 197–215. ISBN 90-5867-377-4.
