= Liberal Democracy (France) =

Former French political party

Liberal Democracy Démocratie libérale
- President: Alain Madelin
- Vice President: Jean-Pierre Raffarin
- Founded: 24 June 1997
- Dissolved: 17 November 2002
- Preceded by: Republican Party
- Merged into: Union for a Popular Movement
- Headquarters: Paris
- Youth wing: Young Liberals
- Ideology: Conservative liberalism Classical liberalism
- Political position: Centre-right
- European Parliament group: European People's Party
- Colours: Blue

Liberal Democracy (French: Démocratie libérale, [demɔkʁasi libeʁal], DL) was a conservative-liberal political party in France which existed from 1997 to 2002. Led by Alain Madelin, it replaced the Republican Party (PR), the classical liberal component of the Union for French Democracy (UDF). It merged into the Union for a Popular Movement (UMP) between the two rounds of the 2002 presidential election.

== History ==
After Madelin won the leadership of the Republican Party on 24 June 1997 with 59.9% of the vote, he renamed the organisation 'Liberal Democracy', and moved the party further towards economic liberalism. This followed the formation of the Democratic Force (FD) by the centrist, Christian democratic component of the Union for French Democracy (UDF), leading to internal rivalry.

Liberal Democracy became independent in 1998, after a split from the UDF. The immediate cause of this departure was Liberal Democracy's refusal to condemn the election of four UDF president of Regional Councils with the votes of the National Front. However, the party had already feared that a tighter UDF would be dominated by economic centrists, preventing his free-market policies being heard.

Thus, Liberal Democracy voted on 16 May 1998 to become a separate party, with Madelin launching the 'Ten Tough Choices' programme advocating transforming the political debate in France. The economic liberals that refused to break ranks with the UDF launched the Independent Republican and Liberal Pole, which later merged with FD and the so-called 'Direct Adherents' to form the New UDF.

In the 1999 EU elections DL ran with the RPR list led by Nicolas Sarkozy. However, the pro-European tone of the RPR-DL campaign deceived and the list was placed in third, behind the eurosceptic RPF list led by Charles Pasqua and Philippe de Villiers. DL obtained four MEPs: Alain Madelin, Françoise Grossetête, Thierry Jean-Pierre and Hervé Novelli.

In the 2002 presidential election, the party split; while Alain Madelin obtained only 3.91% of the votes, party's Vice-President Jean-Pierre Raffarin endorsed incumbent Jacques Chirac. After Chirac won, he appointed Raffarin as Prime Minister on 6 May 2002. At the June 2002 legislative election, DL competed in alliance with the Rally for the Republic and other Chirac supporters as the Union for the Presidential Majority (UMP). On 21 September 2002, DL voted by 15,770 votes to 2,930 to merge with the RPR and pro-Chirac elements of the UDF. The merger was completed on 17 November 2002, creating the Union for a Popular Movement.

== Ideology ==
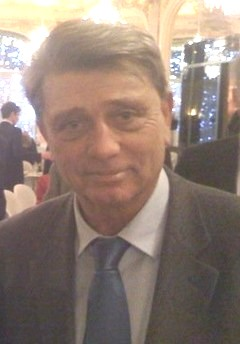
The classical liberal platform adopted by Liberal Democracy mirrored the personal views of its founder and President, Alain Madelin.

The party advocated classical liberalism: promoting less government intervention as the solution to both economic and social problems. In René Rémond's schematic of the French right, it represented the Orléanist strain. In contrast to the 'advanced liberalism' of Valéry Giscard d'Estaing, which still involved social conservatism, Madelin's was more consistently classical liberal and economically similar to Thatcherism.

On economics, DL was systematically more free-market than the UDF. In 1998, the party advocated cutting spending from 50% to 45% within five years, along with reducing the top income tax rate to 35%. Madelin had been fired as Minister of the Economy and Finances in Alain Juppé's government for proposing cutting public sector pay and benefits. As a presidential candidate in 2002, he renewed these calls, along with widespread public sector competition and privatisation.

It was also more secular than the UDF's centrist, Christian democratic elements from which it split, despite being dominated by well-known Catholics. Reflecting this Catholicism, the party was morally conservative, if not always conservative in social policy, and also emphasised anti-corruption, thanks particularly to judge Thierry Jean-Pierre. The party strongly opposed the dominance of École nationale d'administration in public life, with its MPs calling in 2002 for its funding to be halved.

In foreign policy, Liberal Democracy was strongly pro-American. Madelin set himself apart from the rest of the right after September 11 attacks by advocating total support for the United States.

== Political support ==
After its split, Liberal Democracy gained about one-third of the UDF's supporters. The party had significant support in rural areas.

DL's supporters were overall wealthy, highly educated, and from a high socio-economic class, even compared to the New UDF. 42% of DL voters earned over €22,500 a year, compared to 33% of New UDF. The party was firmly backed by managers, who made up 24% of DL's voters (18% for the New UDF); only 4% of DL voters were manual workers (13% for the New UDF). 50% of DL voters had high school diplomas, compared to 40% of New UDF voters.

== Leaders ==
Throughout its existence, Alain Madelin was Liberal Democracy's only President, with Jean-Pierre Raffarin as his Vice-President.

=== Leaders in the National Assembly ===
- José Rossi (1998–2000)
- Jean-François Mattei (2000–2002)
- François d'Aubert (2002)

== See also ==
- Liberal Democratic Party (France)
