= Hervé de Charette =

French politician

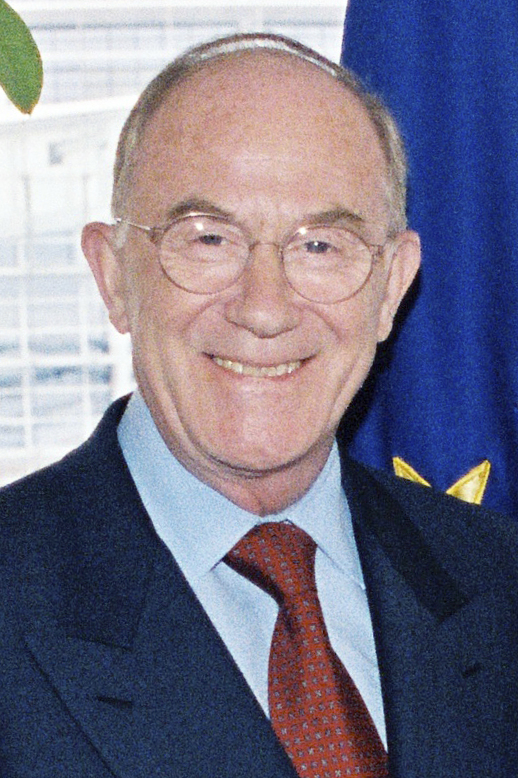
- De Charette in 1999

French Minister of Foreign Affairs
- In office 18 May 1995 – 2 June 1997
- President: Jacques Chirac
- Prime Minister: Alain Juppé
- Preceded by: Alain Juppé
- Succeeded by: Hubert Védrine

Personal details
- Born: 30 July 1938 (age 88) Paris, France
- Party: UDI
- Education: HEC Paris; Sciences Po; ÉNA

Hervé de Charette (French pronunciation: [ɛʁve də ʃaʁɛt]; born 30 July 1938 in Paris) is a French centrist politician. He is a descendant of the royalist military leader François de Charette and of king Charles X of France.

== Political career ==
A member of the Union for French Democracy (UDF), de Charette was elected deputy for the first time in 1986 as representative of the Maine-et-Loire département. During the first cohabitation, from 1986 to 1988, he served as Minister of Civil Service, then, during the second, from 1993 to 1995, as Minister of Housing. In the UDF, he remained faithful to its leader Valéry Giscard d'Estaing. Like him, and contrary to the most part of the UDF politicians, he supported the winning candidacy of Jacques Chirac in the 1995 presidential election and not that of Prime Minister Édouard Balladur. In this, after the campaign, he found and led the Popular Party for French Democracy (PPDF), a component of the UDF, and served as Minister of Foreign Affairs until the defeat of the Presidential Majority in the 1997 legislative election.

In 2002, de Charette joined the Union for a Popular Movement (Union pour un mouvement populaire or UMP). In December 2009, he left this party for the Nouveau Centre.

== Honors and awards ==
Knight of the Order of Legion of Honour (2025)

Political offices
Preceded by Jean-Louis Bianco	Minister of Housing; 1993–1995	Succeeded by Pierre-André Périssol
Preceded by Alain Juppé	Minister of Foreign Affairs; 1995–1997	Succeeded by Hubert Védrine
