= Hubert Védrine =

French politician (born 1947)

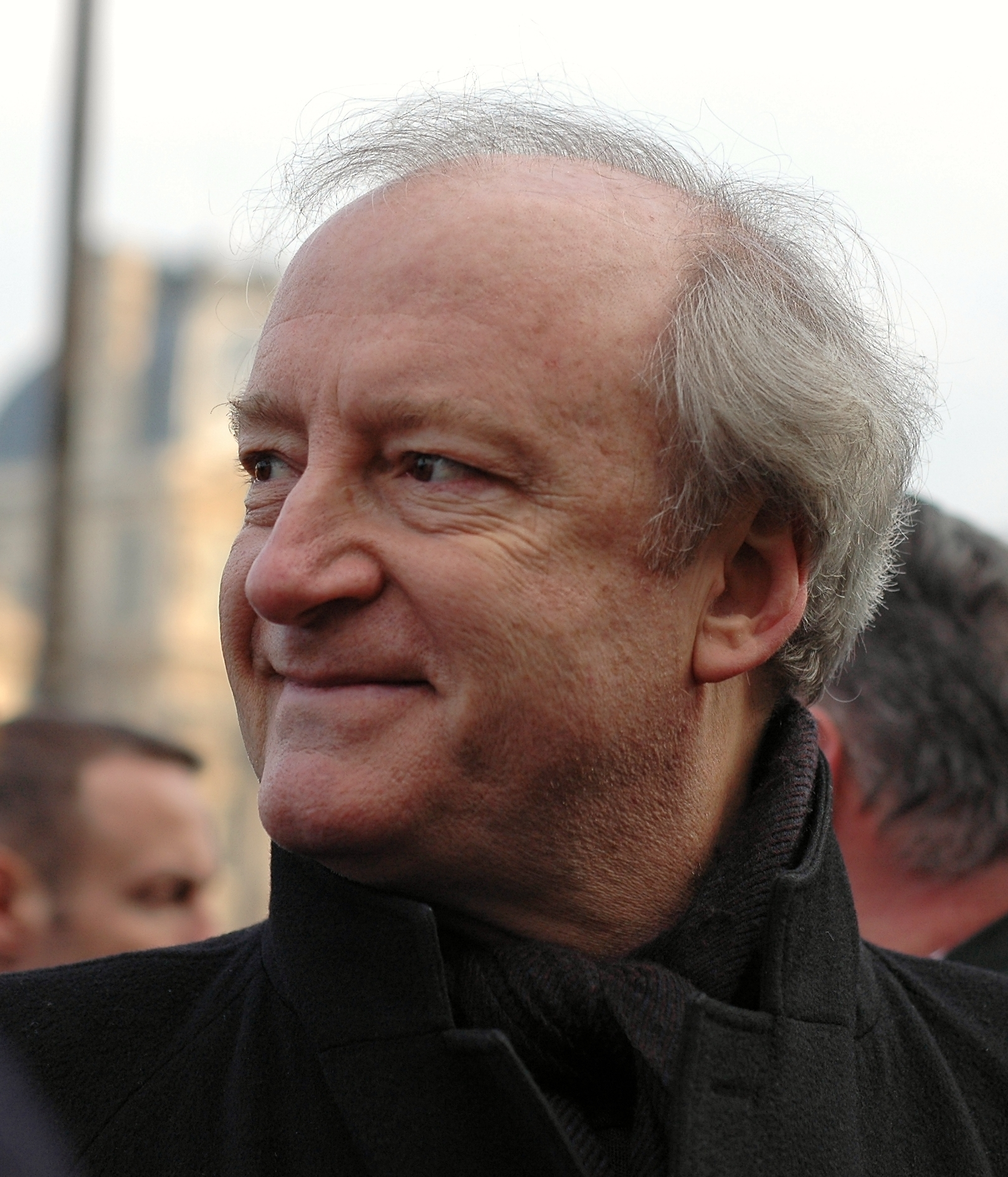
- Védrine in 2006

Minister of Foreign Affairs
- In office 4 June 1997 – 6 May 2002
- Prime Minister: Lionel Jospin
- Preceded by: Hervé de Charette
- Succeeded by: Dominique de Villepin

Secretary General to the President of France
- In office 17 May 1991 – 17 May 1995
- President: François Mitterrand
- Preceded by: Jean-Louis Bianco
- Succeeded by: Dominique de Villepin

Spokesperson of the President
- In office 24 May 1988 – 17 May 1991
- President: François Mitterrand
- Preceded by: Michèle Gendreau-Massaloux
- Succeeded by: Jean Musitelli

Diplomatic advisor to the President
- In office 24 May 1981 – 23 May 1988
- President: François Mitterrand
- Preceded by: Jacques Blot
- Succeeded by: Jean Musitelli

Personal details
- Born: Hubert Yves Pierre Védrine; 31 July 1947 (age 79) Saint-Silvain-Bellegarde, France
- Party: Socialist Party
- Education: Sciences Po; École nationale d'administration

Hubert Yves Pierre Védrine (French: [ybɛʁ vedʁin]; born 31 July 1947) is a French retired senior civil servant and politician who served as Minister of Foreign Affairs from 1997 to 2002. A member of the Socialist Party (PS), he was an advisor and later secretary general at the Élysée under President François Mitterrand. Following his retirement from politics, Védrine became an advisor at Moelis & Company.

== Early life and career ==
Following a history degree and graduating from both Sciences Po and ENA, Védrine had toyed with the idea of entering journalism but, on the advice of the historian and family friend Jean Lacouture, instead took a post at the culture ministry.

Védrine was one of the longest-serving aides to a French President and worked closely with President François Mitterrand from 1981 to 1995. Védrine served first as Mitterrand's diplomatic advisor (the French equivalent of the National Security Advisor) from 1981 to 1988, then as Mitterrand's spokesperson from 1988 to 1991, and finally as Secretary-General of the French presidency (the equivalent of the White House Chief of Staff) from 1991 to 1995.

Védrine then served as Foreign Minister of France from 1997 to 2002 in the government of Lionel Jospin.

After the re-election of Jacques Chirac in May 2002, Védrine was replaced by Dominique de Villepin. All three men were characterised by their strong opposition to unilateral action by the United States in Iraq.

Védrine popularized the neologism "hyperpower" to describe what he saw as the historically unparalleled influence and might that were held by the United States at the turn of the century.

== Later career ==
In 2003, Védrine founded Hubert Vedrine Conseil, a consulting firm.

In 2005, he was appointed by UN Secretary-General Kofi Annan, a member of the High Council for the Alliance of Civilizations, an initiative that seeks to galvanize international action against extremism through intercultural and interreligious dialogue and cooperation.

He took part in 2007 on the committee preparing the Paris Conference on the Environment to lay the foundations for a future United Nations Environment Organization.

Védrine is the author of more than 19 books, two of them having been translated in English by Philip H. Gordon: France in an age of globalization, co-authored with Dominique Moïsi (publisher: Brookings Institution Press, 2001) and History strikes back : how states, nations, and conflicts are shaping the twenty-first century (publisher: Brookings Institution Press, 2008), co-authored with Adrien Abecassis and Mohamed Bouabdallah.

Around the 2017 elections, news media reported that later President Emmanuel Macron sought regularly the advice of Védrine on foreign policy issues. In 2020, he was appointed by NATO Secretary General Jens Stoltenberg to join a group of experts to support his work in a reflection process to further strengthen NATO's political dimension.

== Other activities ==
=== Corporate boards ===
- Amundi, Chairman of the Global Advisory Board (since 2016)
- Moelis & Company, Member of the Global Advisory Board (since 2011)
- Richard Attias and Associates, Member of the International Advisory Board
- LVMH, Independent Member of the Board of Directors (since 2009)
- Ipsos, Independent Member of the Board of Directors (2009–2015)

=== Non-profit organizations ===
- Rencontres d'Arles, chairman of the Board of Directors
- Alliance of Civilizations, Member
- France China Foundation, Member of the Strategic Committee
- French Institute for International and Strategic Affairs (IRIS), Member of the Board of Directors
- Paris School of International Affairs (PSIA), Member of the Strategic Committee
- Senior Network Member at the European Leadership Network (ELN)

== Political positions ==
In February 2020, Védrine joined around fifty former European prime ministers and foreign ministers in signing an open letter published by British newspaper The Guardian to condemn U.S. President Donald Trump's Middle East peace plan, saying it would create an apartheid-like situation in occupied Palestinian territory.

== Recognition ==
Ribbon bar	Country	Honour
	Italy	Grand Officier of the Order of Merit of the Italian Republic
MDA Ordinul Gloria Muncii BAR	Moldova	Grand Officier of the Order of Work Glory
	Monaco	Grand Officier of the Order of Saint-Charles
1st class	Poland	Grand Cross of the Order of Merit of the Republic of Poland
PRT Order of Prince Henry - Grand Cross BAR	Portugal	Grand Cross of the Order of Prince Henry
ROU Order of the Star of Romania 1999 GOfficer BAR	Romania	Grand Officier of the Order of the Star of Romania

Political offices
Preceded by Hervé de Charette	Minister of Foreign Affairs; 1997–2002	Succeeded by Dominique de Villepin
