= Call of Cochin =

Discourse published by Jacques Chirac in 1978

The Call of Cochin (Appel de Cochin) is a famous discourse published on 6 December 1978, by former Prime Minister of France Jacques Chirac, while he was president of the Rally for the Republic (RPR) party and Mayor of Paris.

Its name derives from the name of the Parisian hospital (Hôpital Cochin) in which Chirac was then being treated following from a car accident in the Corrèze département ten days earlier, on 26 November. Chirac was then president of the General Council of the département, and one of its deputies to the National Assembly.

This eurosceptic text, clearly alluding to then president Valéry Giscard d'Estaing and his Union for French Democracy party, criticized the pro-federalist approach of those who sought to expand the power of the European Economic Community. Chirac went so far as to describe them (without naming them openly) as the "party of the foreigners".

== See also ==
- (in French) The text of the Call of Cochin
