= Centre of Social Democrats =

Defunct French political party

Centre of Social Democrats Centre des démocrates sociaux
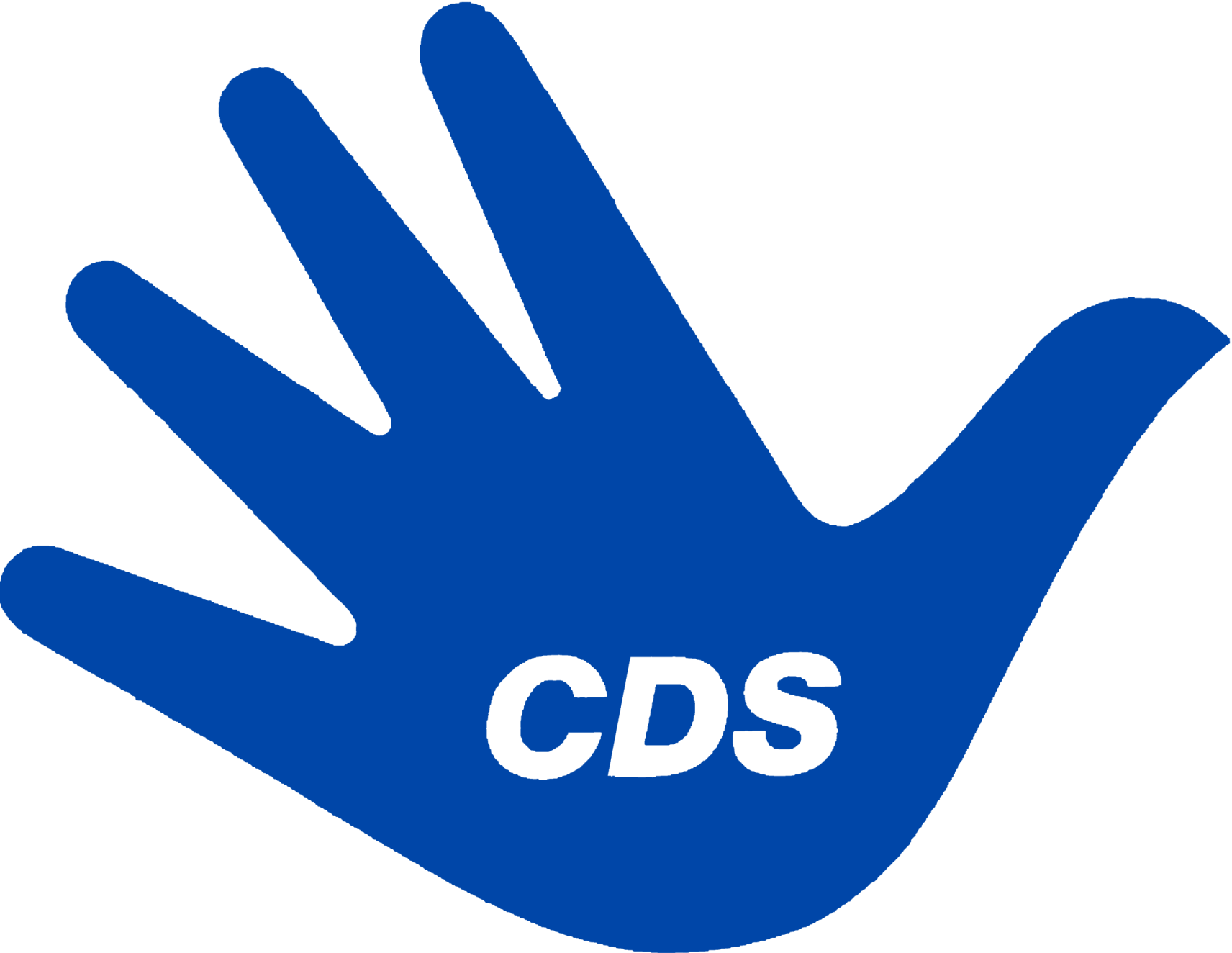
- President: Jean Lecanuet (first); François Bayrou (last)
- Secretary-General: Jacques Barrot (first); Philippe Douste-Blazy (last)
- Founded: 23 May 1976
- Dissolved: 25 November 1995
- Merger of: Democratic Centre; Centre, Democracy and Progress
- Merged into: Democratic Force
- Ideology: Christian democracy
- Political position: Centre
- National affiliation: Union for French Democracy
- European affiliation: European People's Party
- European Parliament group: European People's Party
- International affiliation: Christian Democrat International

The Centre of Social Democrats (French: Centre des démocrates sociaux, pronounced [sɑ̃tʁ de demɔkʁat sɔsjo], CDS; also translated as the "Democratic and Social Centre") was a Christian-democratic and centrist political party in France. It existed from 1976 to 1995 and was based both directly and indirectly on the tradition of the Popular Republican Movement (MRP). The CDS was one of the co-founding parties of the European People's Party (EPP); it later merged into the Democratic Force (FD).

== History ==
It was founded on 23 May 1976 by the merger of the Democratic Centre, Centre, Democracy and Progress, and former members of the Popular Republican Movement (MRP), the National Centre of Independents and Peasants (CNIP), and the Democratic and Socialist Union of the Resistance (UDSR).

On 1 February 1978, the CDS was a founding member of the Union for French Democracy (UDF), alongside the Republican Party of Valéry Giscard d'Estaing and the Radical Party of Jean-Jacques Servan-Schreiber. It was the centrist and Christian democratic component of the UDF. Its leader Jean Lecanuet was the first president of the UDF confederation. It supported the UDF candidates in presidential elections: the incumbent president Valéry Giscard d'Estaing in 1981 and the former Prime Minister Raymond Barre in 1988.

Within the UDF, the CDS was the component which was the less enthusiastic about the alliance with the Gaullist Rally for the Republic (RPR) and after 1988, its leader Pierre Méhaignerie negotiated with the Socialist Prime Minister Michel Rocard to form a governmental coalition with the Socialist Party, which failed. In 1993, Gaullist Prime Minister Edouard Balladur gave CDS politicians numerous positions in his cabinet. In return, and in due to the incapacity of the UDF confederation to nominate a candidate in the 1995 presidential election, the most part of the CDS politicians supported the candidacy of Balladur. But, he was eliminated in the first round. Under the presidency of Jacques Chirac, the place of CDS in the cabinet reduced.

On 25 November 1995, the CDS merged with the Social Democratic Party to form the Democratic Force, under the leadership of François Bayrou, founding component of the New UDF on 16 September 1998.

== Presidents ==
- Jean Lecanuet (1976–82)
- Pierre Méhaignerie (1982–94)
- François Bayrou (1994–95)
