= Republican Party (France) =

Former French political party

Republican Party Parti républicain
- Leader: Valéry Giscard d'Estaing
- President: Jean-Pierre Soisson; Jacques Blanc; Gérard Longuet; François Léotard
- Founder: Valéry Giscard d'Estaing
- Founded: 20 May 1977
- Dissolved: 24 June 1997
- Preceded by: Independent Republicans
- Succeeded by: Liberal Democracy
- Ideology: Liberal conservatism Pro-Europeanism
- Political position: Centre-right
- National affiliation: Union for French Democracy
- European affiliation: ELDR
- European Parliament group: ELDR Group (until 1994); EPP Group (from 1994)
- Colours: Blue and red

The Republican Party (French: Parti républicain, [paʁti ʁepyblikɛ̃], PR) was a liberal-conservative political party in France which existed from 1977 to 1997. Created by the then-President of France, Valéry Giscard d'Estaing, it replaced the National Federation of the Independent Republicans which was founded in 1966. It was known to be conservative in domestic, social and economic policies, pro-NATO, pro-G7, and pro-European.

In 1978, the Republican Party allied with centrist groups to form the Union for French Democracy (UDF), a confederation created in order to support President Giscard d'Estaing and counterbalance the influence of the Gaullist Rally for the Republic (RPR) over the French centre-right. However, after Giscard d'Estaing's defeat at the 1981 presidential election, the PR gravitated away from its founder and a new generation of politicians, led by François Léotard, took the lead.

This group called la bande à Léo ("Léo(tard)'s band"), advocated an alliance with the RPR and covertly supported RPR leader Jacques Chirac's candidacy in the 1988 presidential election, against the official UDF candidate Raymond Barre.

During the 1995 presidential campaign, the PR divided again between the two main centre-right candidates: François Léotard and Gérard Longuet supported Edouard Balladur while Alain Madelin and Jean-Pierre Raffarin supported Jacques Chirac, who won.

Until the split of the UDF confederation in 1998, the Republican Party was its liberal component, advocating economic liberalism. In 1997, it was replaced by Liberal Democracy (DL) led by Alain Madelin.

== Presidents ==
=== Independent Republicans ===
- Valéry Giscard d'Estaing (1966–74)
- Michel Poniatowski (1975–77)

=== Republican Party ===
- Jean-Pierre Soisson (1977–88)
- François Léotard (1988–90)
- Gérard Longuet (1990–95)
- François Léotard (1995–97)
- Alain Madelin (1997)
