= Independent Republicans =

French political party founded in 1966

Independent Republicans Républicains Indépendants
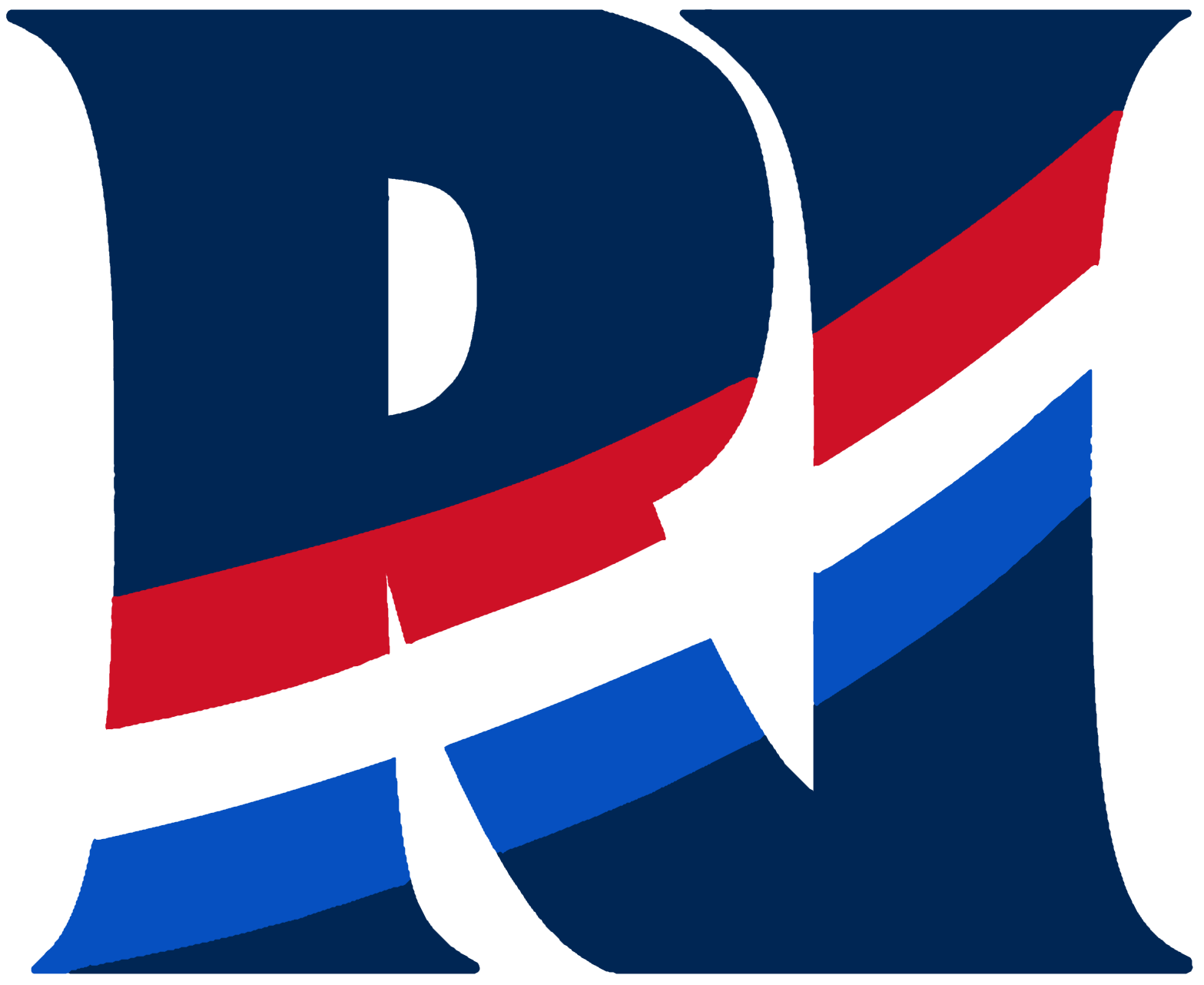
- President: Valéry Giscard d'Estaing
- Founded: December 6, 1962; 63 years ago (Note: as the Study and Liaison Committee of Independent Republicans); June 1, 1966; 60 years ago (Note: as the National Federation of the Independent Republicans)
- Dissolved: May 20, 1977; 49 years ago
- Split from: National Centre of Independents and Peasants
- Succeeded by: Republican Party
- Ideology: Liberal conservatism Pro-Europeanism
- Political position: Centre-right
- Colours: Navy

The Independent Republicans (French: Républicains Indépendants, pronounced [ʁepyblikɛ̃ ɛ̃depɑ̃dɑ̃]; RI) were a liberal-conservative political group in France founded in 1962, which became a political party in 1966 known as the National Federation of the Independent Republicans (Fédération nationale des républicains et indépendants [fedeʁɑsjɔ̃ nɑsjɔnal de ʁepyblikɛ̃ e ɛ̃depɑ̃dɑ̃]; FNRI). Its leader was Valéry Giscard d'Estaing.

In 1977 it became the Republican Party which joined the Union for French Democracy (UDF) the following year.

== History ==
The Independent Republicans came from the liberal-conservative National Centre of Independents and Peasants (CNIP). In 1962, the CNIP chose to leave Charles de Gaulle's coalition due to his Euroscepticism and the presidential nature of the regime. But, the CNIP ministers refused to leave the cabinet and the "presidential majority". Under the leadership of the Minister of Economy and Finances Valéry Giscard d'Estaing, they created the group of the Independent Republicans. It was the small partner of the Gaullists which tried to influence the executive's policy in favour of economic liberalism and European federalism.

The relation with the Gaullists tensed when Giscard was dismissed from the cabinet in 1966. The group became a political party, the National Federation of the Independent Republicans (FNRI), directed by the general secretary Michel Poniatowski. Giscard defined the Independent Republicans as "liberal, centrist and pro-European". It stood in the parliamentary majority, but chosen a critical attitude. Giscard summed up his opinion about the Gaullist policy by a "yes, but...".

In 1969, the party divided about the referendum of regionalization and Senate's reform. Giscard called to vote "no". President de Gaulle resigned when the "no" won. The FNRI supported the winning candidacy of Georges Pompidou for the presidency and its leader re-integrated the cabinet as Economy Minister.

In 1974, after President Pompidou's death, Giscard announced his candidacy at the 1974 presidential election. It was supported by the FNRI, the Reform Movement and, covertly, by some Gaullists. He eliminated Gaullist Jacques Chaban-Delmas in the first round and then defeated Socialist François Mitterrand in the run-off.

Three years later, the FNRI was replaced by the Republican Party (PR) which became the liberal-conservative wing of the Union for French Democracy (UDF) created in 1978.

== Election results ==
=== Presidential ===
Election	Candidate	First round		Second round		Result
Election	Candidate	Votes	%	Votes	%	Result
1965	Supported Charles de Gaulle					Won
1969	Supported Georges Pompidou					Won
1974	Valéry Giscard d'Estaing	8,326,774	32.60	13,396,203	50.81	Won

=== National Assembly ===
Election	Leader	1st round		2nd round		Seats	+/−	Government
Election	Leader	Votes	%	Votes	%	Seats	+/−	Government
1962	Valéry Giscard d'Estaing	1,089,348	5.94	1,444,666	9.46	27 / 491	▲27	Presidential majority
1967	Valéry Giscard d'Estaing	8,448,082	37.73	7,972,908	42.60	42 / 491	▲15	Presidential majority
1968	Valéry Giscard d'Estaing	9,667,532	43.65	6,762,170	46.39	61 / 491	▲19	Presidential majority
1973	Valéry Giscard d'Estaing	8,242,661	34.68	10,701,135	45.62	55 / 491	▼6	Presidential majority
