= Social Democratic Party (France) =

Defunct French political party

The Social Democratic Party (French: Parti social-démocrate, pronounced [paʁti sɔsjal demɔkʁat], PSD) was a centre-left political party in France.

Originally named Democratic Socialist Movement of France (Mouvement démocrate socialiste de France, MDSF), the party was founded in 1973, by a split from the Socialist Party (PS). Its founders (among them Max Lejeune, André Santini, Pierre-Cristophe Baguet, Charles Baur, Émile Muller, Joseph Klifa and Auguste Locoeur) opposed to the alliance with the French Communist Party (PCF) arranged by François Mitterrand on behalf of the PS based on the Common Programme.

In 1978, the PSD joined the Union for French Democracy (UDF), the centre-right confederation created in order to support President Valéry Giscard d'Estaing. In 1995, the PSD merged with the Centre of Social Democrats (CDS), the Christian-democratic component of the confederation, to form Democratic Force (FD), which later became the core of a unified UDF in 1998.
