= François Léotard =

French politician (1942–2023)

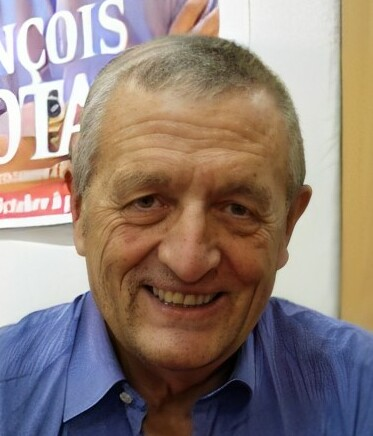
- Léotard in 2011

Minister of Defence
- In office 30 March 1993 – 18 May 1995
- President: François Mitterrand
- Prime Minister: Édouard Balladur
- Preceded by: Pierre Bérégovoy
- Succeeded by: Charles Millon

Minister of Culture
- In office 20 March 1986 – 10 May 1988
- President: François Mitterrand
- Prime Minister: Jacques Chirac
- Preceded by: Jack Lang
- Succeeded by: Jack Lang

President of the Union for French Democracy
- In office 31 March 1996 – 16 September 1998
- Preceded by: Valéry Giscard d'Estaing
- Succeeded by: François Bayrou

Mayor of Fréjus
- In office 1977–1997
- Preceded by: Léon Héritier
- Succeeded by: Élie Brun

Personal details
- Born: 26 March 1942 Cannes, France
- Died: 25 April 2023 (aged 81) Fréjus, France
- Party: UDF
- Relatives: Philippe Léotard (brother)
- Education: Sciences Po, ÉNA

François Gérard Marie Léotard (French pronunciation: [fʁɑ̃swa leɔtaʁ]; 26 March 1942 – 25 April 2023) was a French politician. Singer and actor Philippe Léotard was his brother.

A member of the Republican Party, the liberal-conservative component of the Union for French Democracy (UDF), he appeared in the foreground of the political scene in the 1980s. He led a new generation of right-wing politicians, the "renovationmen", who opposed the old right-wing leaders Jacques Chirac and Valéry Giscard d'Estaing.

In 1981, he was selected to be one of the first Young Leaders of the French-American Foundation. His political career started with being elected as the mayor of Fréjus in 1977. He served two terms as the deputy of Var.

As culture minister from 1986 to 1988, he sold the main public TV channel TF1. He returned to the French cabinet as defense minister, from 1993 to 1995. Supporting the candidacy of Edouard Balladur in the 1995 presidential election, he was dismissed after Chirac's election. Elected president of the UDF in 1996, he could not prevent the split of this confederation two years later with Alain Madelin's secession. This and the party's poor showing in the 1998 regional elections prompted his resignation. After a mission in Macedonia in 2001 as representative of the European Union, he retired from politics. In 2003, he created together with other prominent European personalities the Medbridge Strategy Center, whose goal is to promote dialogue and mutual understanding between Europe and the Middle East. He later authored several books.

Léotard died in Fréjus on 25 April 2023, at age 81.

== Political career ==
Governmental functions

Minister of state, minister of defence : 1993–1995.

Minister of Culture and Communication : 1986–1988.

Electoral mandates

National Assembly of France

Member of the National Assembly of France for Var : 1978–1986 (Became minister in 1986) / 1988–1993 (Became minister in 1993) / 1995–2001 (Resignation). Elected in 1978, reelected in 1981, 1986, 1988, 1993, 1995, 1997.

Regional Council

Regional councillor of Provence-Alpes-Côte d'Azur : 1998–2004.

General Council

General councillor of Var : 1979–1988 (Resignation). Reelected in 1985.

Municipal Council

Mayor of Fréjus : 1977–1997 (Resignation). Reelected in 1983, 1989, 1995.

Municipal councillor of Fréjus : 1977–1997 (Resignation). Reelected in 1983, 1989, 1995.

Political functions

President of the UDF : 1996–1998.

President of the Republican Party : 1982–1990 / 1995–1997.

== Books ==
Léotard wrote also several books including non-fiction and a couple of novels:

- Ma liberté (My freedom) published by Plon, 1995
- Pour l'honneur (For honor) published by B. Grasset, 1997
- La Couleur des femmes (The colour of women) published by Grasset & Fasquelle, 2002
- À mon frère qui n'est pas mort (For my brother who is not dead) published by Grasset & Fasquelle, 2003
- La vie mélancolique des méduses (The melancholic life of Jellyfish) published by Grasset & Fasquelle, 2005
- Ça va mal finir (It's going to end badly) published by Grasset & Fasquelle, 2008

== See also ==
- www.medbridge.org

Political offices
| Preceded by Pierre Bérégovoy | Minister of Defence; 1993–1995 | Succeeded by Charles Millon |
Party political offices
| Preceded by Valéry Giscard d'Estaing | President of the Union for French Democracy; 1996–1998 | Succeeded by François Bayrou |
