= 1981 French presidential election =

- 26 April 1981 (first round); 10 May 1981 (second round)
- Turnout: 81.09% (first round); 85.85% (second round)
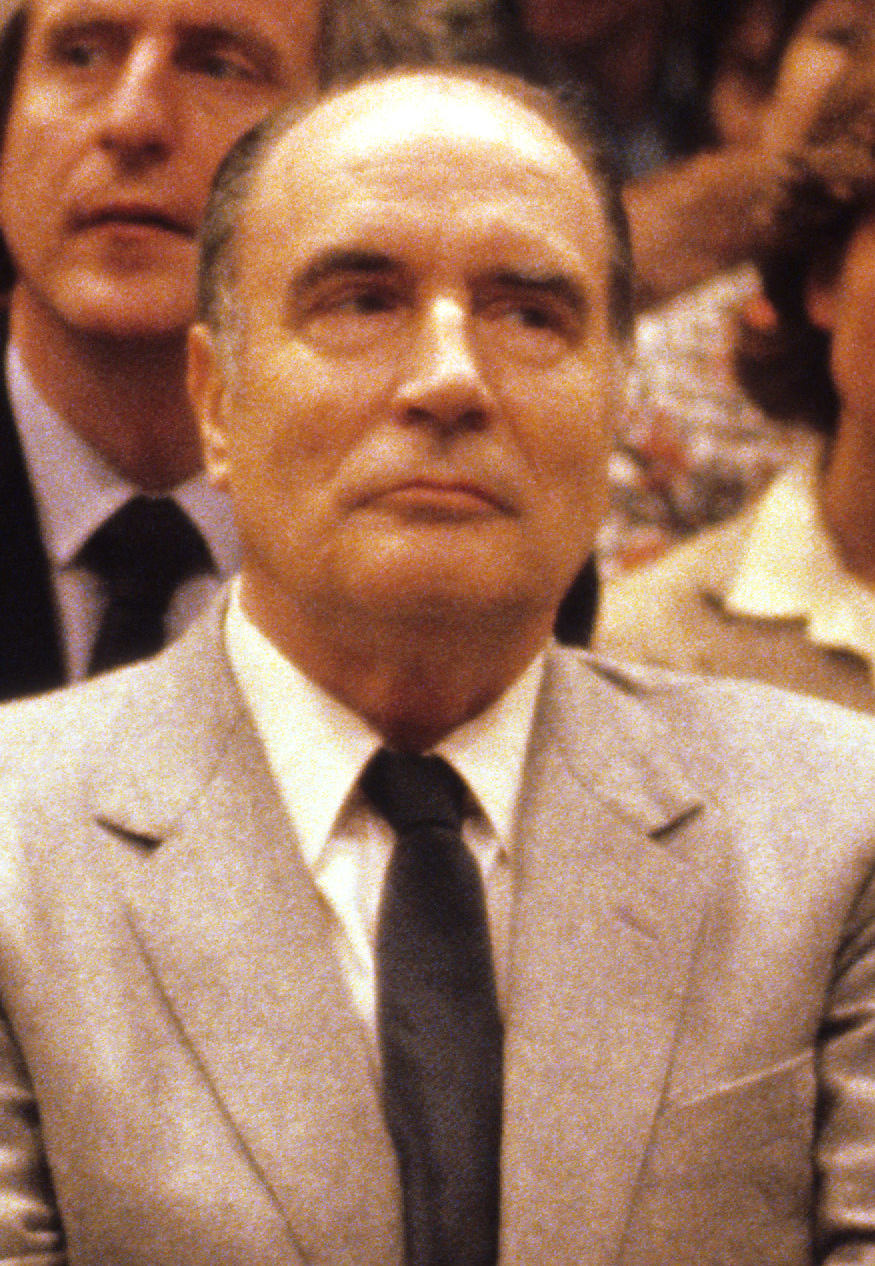

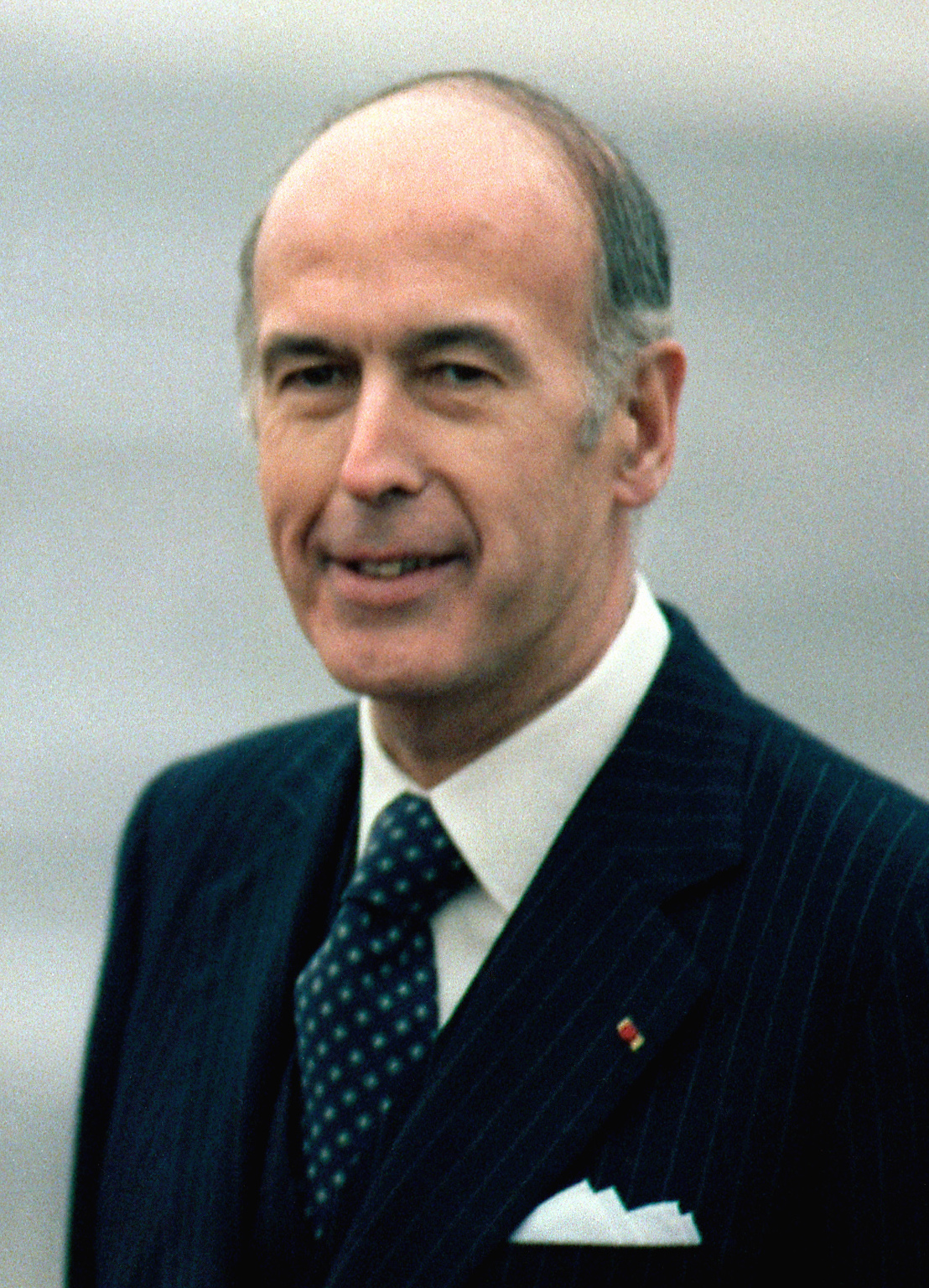
Candidate	François Mitterrand	Valéry Giscard d'Estaing
Party	PS	UDF
Popular vote	15,708,262	14,642,306
Percentage	51.76%	48.24%
President before election
Valéry Giscard d'Estaing
UDF
Elected President
François Mitterrand
PS

Presidential elections were held in France on 26 April 1981, with a second round on 10 May. François Mitterrand defeated incumbent president, Valéry Giscard d'Estaing to become the first Socialist president of the Fifth Republic. It was the first presidential election in French history where an incumbent president actively seeking reelection was denied a second term.

In the first round of voting on 26 April 1981, a political spectrum of ten candidates stood for election, and the leading two candidates – Mitterrand and Giscard d'Estaing – advanced to a second round. Mitterrand and his Socialist Party received 51.76% of the vote, while Giscard and his Union for French Democracy trailed with about 48.24%, a margin of 1,065,956 votes.

The Socialist Party's electoral program was called 110 Propositions for France. Mitterrand served as President of France for the full seven-year term (1981–1988) and won re-election in 1988.

== Electoral system ==
If Giscard's internal political handicaps had effectively "crippled" him in the initial race, the external factors that decided the 1981 election were a deadly blow. Neatly summarized in an article by Hugh Dauncey: "It was Giscard's double misfortune that his presidency should be blighted both by unprecedented economic difficulties, and by a political system which was stubbornly unreceptive to the ouverture and centralist compromise that he required for his reforms to fully succeed". The electoral and party system (political system) in France had, indeed, undergone many critical changes during the previous years. In particular the introduction of the two-round, majority vote requirement played a large role in the election of 1981. The new electoral system divided the various right and left factions within themselves during the first round, but led to right and left polarization during the second round. That forced the right and the left to strategize for both the first and second parts of the election.

In the first round, candidates must present themselves as the better candidate while being careful not to remove all credibility of his/her fellow right or left candidates, as their opponents may have to run again in the next round against the opposing right or left candidate. (It is much the same in US primary elections.)

In the second round, however, total unity must be achieved. That leads to the movement of both groups toward the center, with coalitions between center groups and extremists within the right and left.

Jean-Marie Le Pen of the National Front and Alain Krivine of the Revolutionary Communist League, both of whom had been candidates in 1974, declared their intentions to run again. However, presidential candidates have to secure support from a specific number of elected officials, from a specific number of departments, in order to be eligible to run for election; in 1976, the number of required elected officials had been increased fivefold, and the number of departments threefold. This increased requirement left Le Pen and Krivine unable to participate.

=== Division tactics ===
The new electoral "rules of the game", was one of the most notable factors that decided the 1981 election. The division within the right between the two main factions, Giscard's Union pour la démocratie française (UDF) and Chirac's neo-Gaullist Rassemblement pour la République (RPR), proved to be the final blow to Giscard (Painton, par. 12). When Chirac lost the "primary", he refused to advise his supporters to back Giscard in the runoff though he stated that he would vote for Giscard. In effect, Chirac refused to endorse Giscard as the sole candidate of the centre-right.

There was also the tactical ingenuity on the part of the Left that brought about Mitterrand's victory. As author Penniman points out, in a shrewd move, the left gained "strength through disunity". The right's disunity between the UDF and RPR factions brought about the downfall of their major candidate. The split between the left's Socialist and Communist Parties, however, allowed the electorate to be more comfortable voting for the Socialists while it gained Communist votes, which were roughly 20% of the electorate.

== Results ==
Candidate	Party	First round		Second round	
Candidate	Party	Votes	%	Votes	%
Valéry Giscard d'Estaing (incumbent)	Union for French Democracy	8,222,432	28.32	14,642,306	48.24
François Mitterrand	Socialist Party	7,505,960	25.85	15,708,262	51.76
Jacques Chirac	Rally for the Republic	5,225,848	18.00		
Georges Marchais	French Communist Party	4,456,922	15.35		
Brice Lalonde	Political Ecology Movement	1,126,254	3.88		
Arlette Laguiller	Workers' Struggle	668,057	2.30		
Michel Crépeau	Movement of Radicals of the Left	642,847	2.21		
Michel Debré	Rally for the Republic (splinter)	481,821	1.66		
Marie-France Garaud	Rally for the Republic (splinter)	386,623	1.33		
Huguette Bouchardeau	Unified Socialist Party	321,353	1.11		
Total		29,038,117	100.00	30,350,568	100.00
Valid votes		29,038,117	98.38	30,350,568	97.12
Invalid/blank votes		477,965	1.62	898,984	2.88
Total votes		29,516,082	100.00	31,249,552	100.00
Registered voters/turnout		36,398,859	81.09	36,398,762	85.85
Source: Constitutional Court, Constitutional Court

== See also ==
- President of France
- Politics of France
- French presidential elections under the Fifth Republic

== Sources ==
- Bell, David S. (2005). François Mitterrand: A Political Biography. Cambridge, England: Polity. ISBN 9780745631042.
- Bonfante, Jordan. "Holding Most of the Cards." TIME Europe 23 May 1988. 12 Nov. 2004 .
- Cauchy, Pascal (2011). L'Election d'un notable: Les coulisses de Mai 1981 [The Election of a Worthy: Behind the Scenes of May 1981] (in French). Paris: Vendemiaire. ISBN 9782363580078.
- Dauncey, Hugh. "The Giscard Presidency 1974–1981: Towards a New France". Contemporary France Online. Liverpool: Web Enhanced Language Learning Project at Liverpool John Moores University. Archived from the original on 21 January 2005.
- Girardet, Edward. "France Plunges into Socialist Era." Christian Science Monitor. 22 May 1981. LexisNexis. Stetson University Library, DeLand, FL. 22 Nov. 2004 .
- MacCulloch, Nancy and Anita McCarthy, ed. France: History and Culture. Irwindale, CA: Barr Films, 1988. Watched 1 Nov. 2004.
- Mosby, Aline. "Presidential Hopefuls Wage 'Campaign à la Américaine.'" United Press International. 25 Apr. 1981. LexisNexis. Stetson University Library, DeLand, FL. 22 Nov. 2004 .
- Painton, Frederick. "France Chooses Change." TIME Europe 18 May 1981. 12 Nov. 2004 .
- Penniman, Howard, ed. France at the Polls, 1981 and 1986: Three National Elections. Durham, NC: Duke University Press, 1988.
- Safran, William. The French Polity. New York: Longman, 1998.
