= Democratic Force (France) =

Defunct French political party

Democratic Force Force démocrate
- Abbreviation: FD
- President: François Bayrou
- Founded: 24 November 1995
- Dissolved: 29 November 1998
- Merger of: Centre of Social Democrats; Social Democratic Party
- Merged into: Union for French Democracy
- Headquarters: 133 bis rue de l'Université; 75007 Paris
- Ideology: Christian democracy Social liberalism European federalism
- Political position: Centre
- National affiliation: Union for French Democracy
- Colors: Blue; Red

The Democratic Force (French: Force démocrate, [fɔʁs(ə) demɔkʁat], FD) was a centrist political party in France that existed from 1995 to 1998. It was led by François Bayrou, who went on to become leader of the Union for French Democracy (UDF) upon the party's disestablishment.

== History ==
The party was founded in 1995 by the merger of the centrist components of the Union for French Democracy: the Christian-democratic Centre of Social Democrats (CDS) and the social-liberal Social Democratic Party (PSD).

The party disappeared in 1998, when the UDF confederation became a unified political party. The former leader (president) of the Democratic Force, François Bayrou, became leader of the new party, as well as more recently leader of the UDF's successor party, the Democratic Movement (MoDem). However, a large chunk of the FD's former members later sided with the more right-wing Union for a Popular Movement (UMP) and its successor The Republicans (LR), as well as the Democratic European Force (FED), formed by a New Centre splinter group led by Jean-Christophe Lagarde and later aligned with the Union of Democrats and Independents (UDI), of which Lagarde served as leader.

Philippe Douste-Blazy, the former CDS secretary-general, remained in office as FD secretary-general, assisted by Claude Goasguen (from 1996) and André Santini. Michel Mercier was treasurer.
