= Valéry Giscard d'Estaing =

President of France from 1974 to 1981

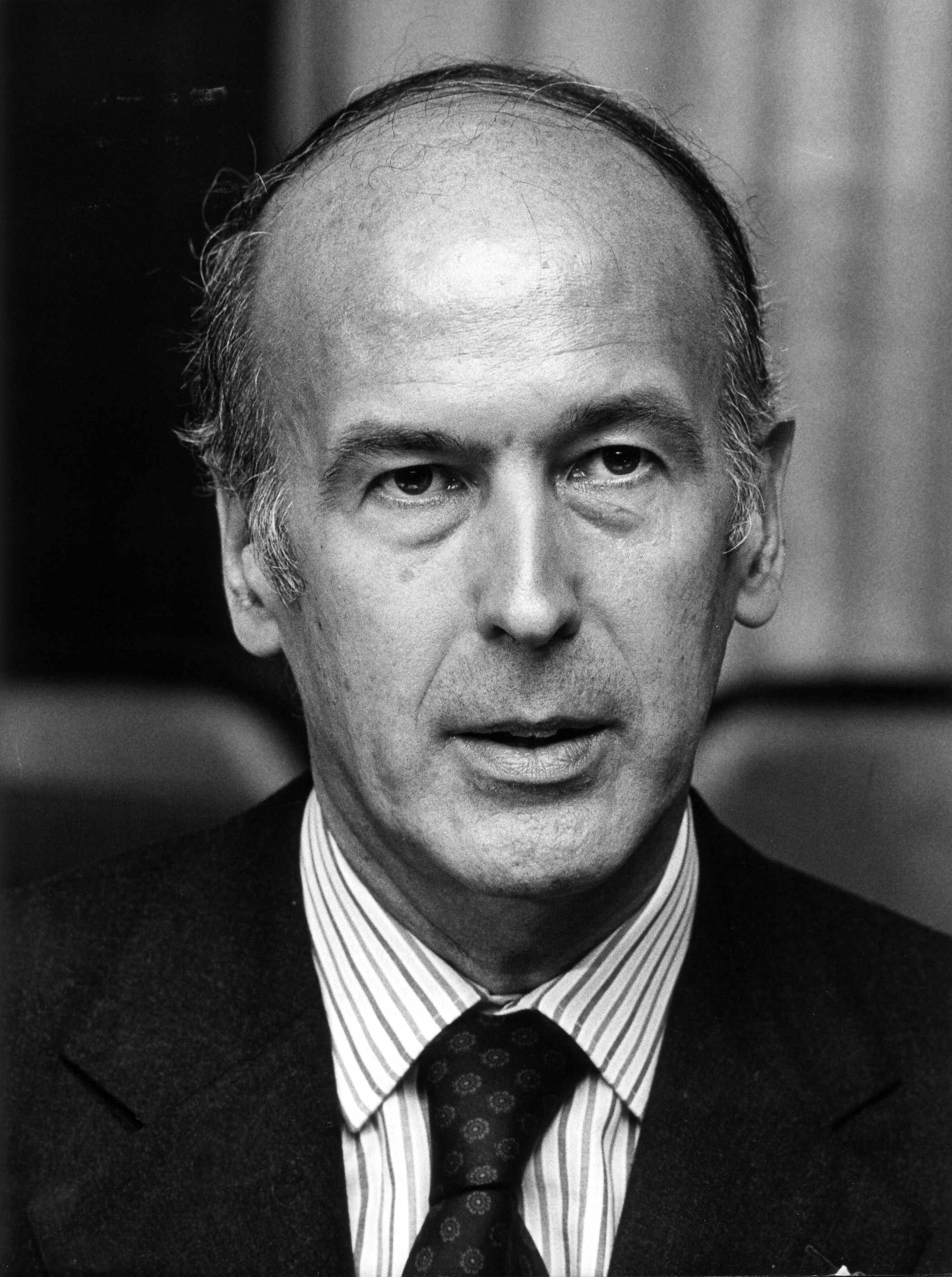
- Giscard d'Estaing in 1975

President of France
- In office 27 May 1974 – 21 May 1981
- Prime Minister: Jacques Chirac; Raymond Barre
- Preceded by: Georges Pompidou (Note: Alain Poher served as acting president from Pompidou's death until Giscard d'Estaing took office)
- Succeeded by: François Mitterrand

President of the Regional Council of Auvergne
- In office 21 March 1986 – 2 April 2004
- Preceded by: Maurice Pourchon
- Succeeded by: Pierre-Joël Bonté

Minister of the Economy and Finance
- In office 20 June 1969 – 27 May 1974
- Prime Minister: Jacques Chaban-Delmas; Pierre Messmer
- Preceded by: François-Xavier Ortoli
- Succeeded by: Jean-Pierre Fourcade
- In office 18 January 1962 – 8 January 1966
- Prime Minister: Michel Debré; Georges Pompidou
- Preceded by: Wilfrid Baumgartner
- Succeeded by: Michel Debré

Mayor of Chamalières
- In office 15 September 1967 – 19 May 1974
- Preceded by: Pierre Chatrousse
- Succeeded by: Claude Wolff

President of the Union for French Democracy
- In office 30 June 1988 – 31 March 1996
- Preceded by: Jean Lecanuet
- Succeeded by: François Léotard

Personal details
- Born: Valéry René Marie Georges Giscard d'Estaing; 2 February 1926 Koblenz, Germany
- Died: 2 December 2020 (aged 94) Authon, Loir-et-Cher, France
- Resting place: Authon Cemetery, Authon
- Party: CNIP (1956–1962); FNRI (1966–1977); PR (1977–1995); UDF (1978–2002); PPDF (1995–1997); DL (1997–1998); UMP (2002–2004)
- Spouse: Anne-Aymone Sauvage de Brantes (m. 1952)
- Children: 4, including Henri and Louis
- Education: École Polytechnique; ENA

Military service
- Allegiance: Free France
- Branch/service: Free French Forces
- Years of service: 1944–1945
- Rank: Brigadier-chef
- Battles/wars: World War II; Liberation of Paris
- Awards: Croix de Guerre 1939–1945

Valéry René Marie Georges Giscard d'Estaing (UK: /ˌʒiːskɑːr dɛˈstæ̃/, US: /ʒɪˌskɑːr -/; French: [valeʁi ʁəne maʁi ʒɔʁʒ ʒiskaʁ dɛstɛ̃]; 2 February 1926 – 2 December 2020), also known as simply Giscard or VGE, was President of France from 1974 to 1981.

After serving as Minister of Finance under prime ministers Jacques Chaban-Delmas and Pierre Messmer, Giscard d'Estaing won the presidential election of 1974 with 50.8% of the vote against François Mitterrand of the Socialist Party. His tenure was marked by a more liberal attitude on social issues—such as divorce, contraception and abortion—and by attempts to modernise the country and the office of the presidency, notably overseeing such far-reaching infrastructure projects as the TGV and the turn towards reliance on nuclear power as France's main energy source. Giscard d'Estaing launched the Grande Arche, Musée d'Orsay, Arab World Institute and Cité des Sciences et de l'Industrie projects in the Paris region, later included in the Grands Projets of François Mitterrand. He promoted liberalisation of trade; however, his popularity suffered from the economic downturn that followed the 1973 energy crisis, marking the end of the Trente Glorieuses (the "Thirty Glorious Years" of prosperity after 1945). He imposed austerity budgets, and allowed unemployment to rise in order to avoid deficits. Giscard d'Estaing in the centre faced political opposition from both sides of the spectrum: from the newly unified left under Mitterrand and a rising Jacques Chirac, who resurrected Gaullism on a right-wing opposition line. In 1981, despite a high approval rating, he was defeated in a runoff against Mitterrand, with 48.2% of the vote.

As president, Giscard d'Estaing promoted cooperation among the European nations, especially in tandem with West Germany under Chancellor Helmut Schmidt (SPD).

As a former president, Giscard d'Estaing was a member of the Constitutional Council. He also served as president of the Regional Council of Auvergne from 1986 to 2004. Involved with the process of European integration, he notably presided over the Convention on the Future of Europe that drafted the ill-fated Treaty establishing a Constitution for Europe. In 2003, he was elected to the Académie Française, taking the seat that his friend and former president of Senegal Léopold Sédar Senghor had held. He died at the age of 94, and is the longest-lived French president in history.

== Early life and ancestry ==
Valéry René Marie Georges Giscard d'Estaing was born on 2 February 1926 in Koblenz, Germany, during the French occupation of the Rhineland. He was the elder son of Jean Edmond Lucien Giscard d'Estaing, a high-ranking civil servant, and his wife, Marthe Clémence Jacqueline Marie (May) Bardoux. His mother was the daughter of senator and academic Achille Octave Marie Jacques Bardoux, and a granddaughter of minister of state education Agénor Bardoux.

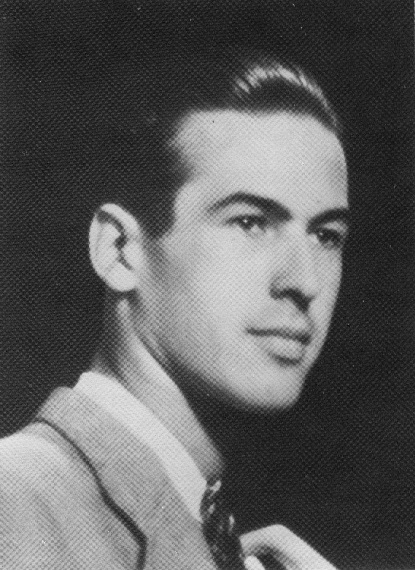
Giscard d'Estaing in the 1940s

Giscard had an elder sister, Sylvie, and younger siblings Olivier, Isabelle, and Marie-Laure. Despite the addition of “d’Estaing” to the family name by his grandfather, Giscard was not a patrilineal descendant of the extinct aristocratic d'Estaing family of Vice-Admiral d’Estaing, but rather descended through a female-line ancestor from the family’s illegitimate branch, five generations earlier.

Giscard studied at the Lycée Blaise-Pascal in Clermont-Ferrand, the École Gerson and the Lycées Janson-de-Sailly and Louis-le-Grand in Paris.

He joined the French Resistance and participated in the Liberation of Paris; during the liberation, he was assigned to protecting Alexandre Parodi. He then joined the French First Army and served until the end of the war. He was later awarded the Croix de guerre for his military service.

In 1948, he spent a year in Montreal, Canada, where he worked as a teacher at Collège Stanislas.

He graduated from the École Polytechnique and the École nationale d'administration (1949–1951) and chose to enter the prestigious Inspection des finances. He was admitted to the Tax and Revenue Service, then joined the staff of Prime Minister Edgar Faure (1955–1956). He was fluent in German.

== Early political career ==
=== First offices: 1956–1962 ===
In 1956, he was elected to the National Assembly as a deputy for the Puy-de-Dôme département, in the domain of his maternal family. He joined the National Centre of Independents and Peasants (CNIP), a conservative grouping. After the proclamation of the Fifth Republic, the CNIP leader Antoine Pinay became Minister of Economy and Finance and chose him as Secretary of State for Finances from 1959 to 1962.

=== Member of the Gaullist majority: 1962–1974 ===
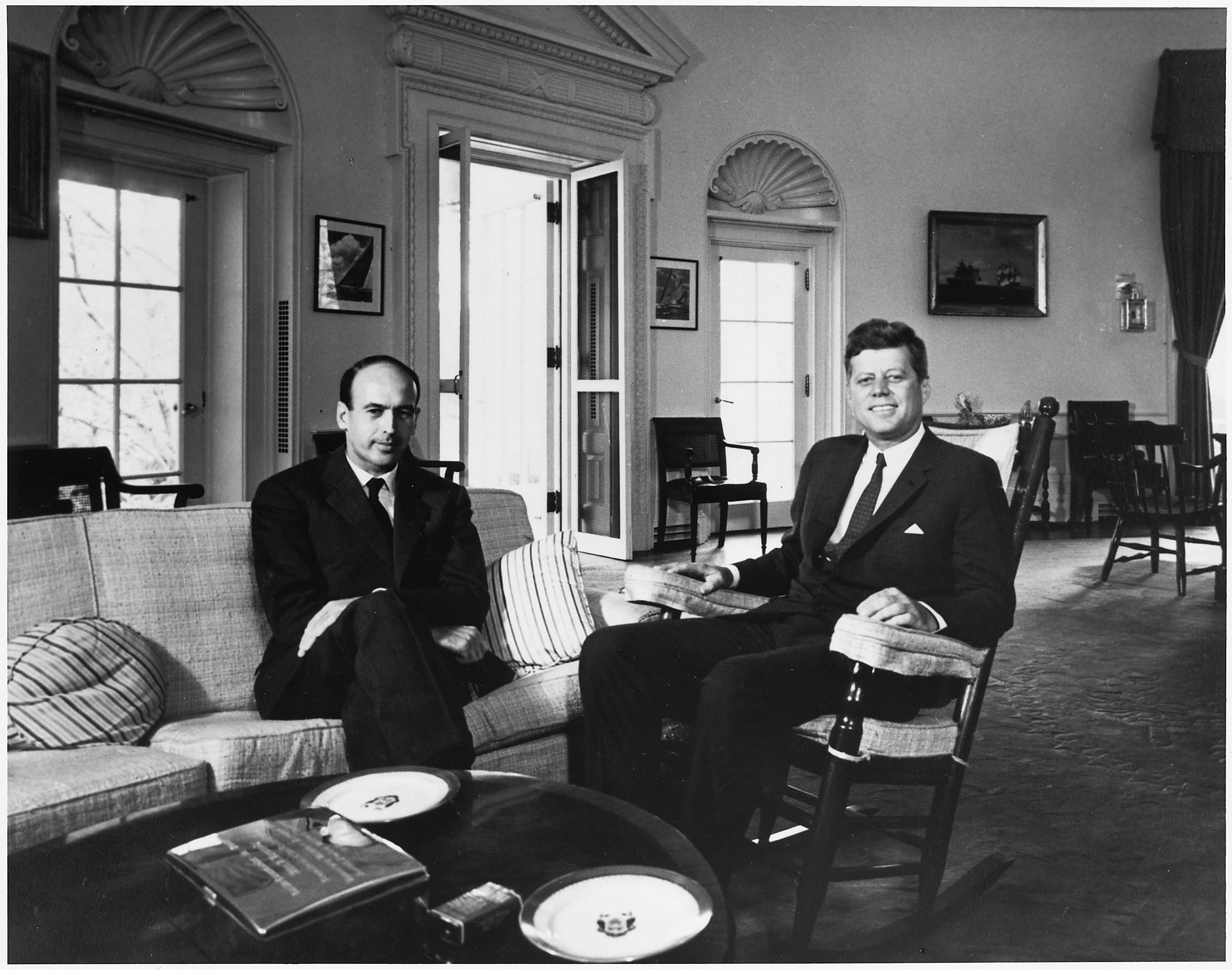
Giscard with US president John F. Kennedy at the White House in 1962

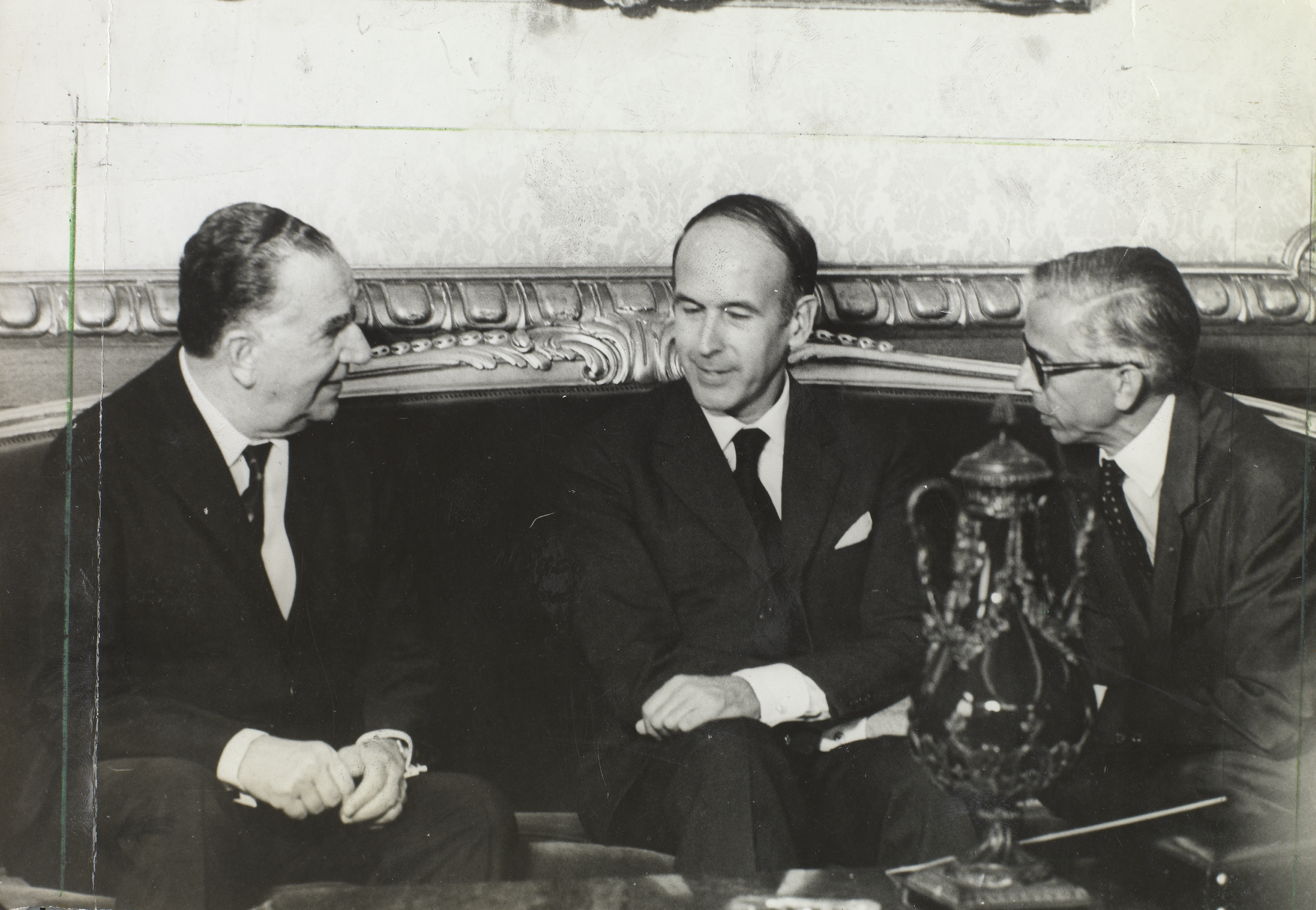
Giscard d'Estaing (center) with Brazilian president Emílio Garrastazu Médici (left) in Brazil, 1971

In 1962, while Giscard had been nominated Minister of Economy and Finance, his party broke with the Gaullists and left the majority coalition. Giscard refused to resign and founded the Independent Republicans (RI), which became the junior partner of the Gaullists in the "presidential majority". It was during his time at the Ministry of the Economy that he coined the phrase "exorbitant privilege" to characterise the hegemony of the US dollar in international payments under the Bretton Woods system.

However, in 1966, he was dismissed from the cabinet. He transformed the RI into a political party, the National Federation of the Independent Republicans (FNRI), and founded the Perspectives and Realities Clubs. In this, he criticised the "solitary practice of the power" and summarised his position towards De Gaulle's policy by a "yes, but ...". As chairman of the National Assembly Committee on Finances, he criticised his successor in the cabinet.

For that reason the Gaullists refused to re-elect him to that position after the 1968 legislative election. In 1969, unlike most of FNRI's elected officials, Giscard advocated a "no" vote in the constitutional referendum concerning the regions and the Senate, while De Gaulle had announced his intention to resign if the "no" won. The Gaullists accused him of being largely responsible for De Gaulle's departure.

During the 1969 presidential campaign, he supported the winning candidate Georges Pompidou, after which he returned to the Ministry of Economy and Finance. He was representative of a new generation of politicians emerging from the senior civil service, seen as "technocrats".

=== Presidential election victory ===
In 1974, after the sudden death of President Georges Pompidou, Giscard announced his candidacy for the presidency. His two main challengers were François Mitterrand for the left and Jacques Chaban-Delmas, a former Gaullist prime minister. Jacques Chirac and other Gaullist personalities published the Call of the 43 where they explained that Giscard was the best candidate to prevent the election of Mitterrand. In the election, Giscard finished well ahead of Chaban-Delmas in the first round, though coming second to Mitterrand. In the run-off on 20 May, however, Giscard narrowly defeated Mitterrand, receiving 50.7% of the vote.

== President of France ==
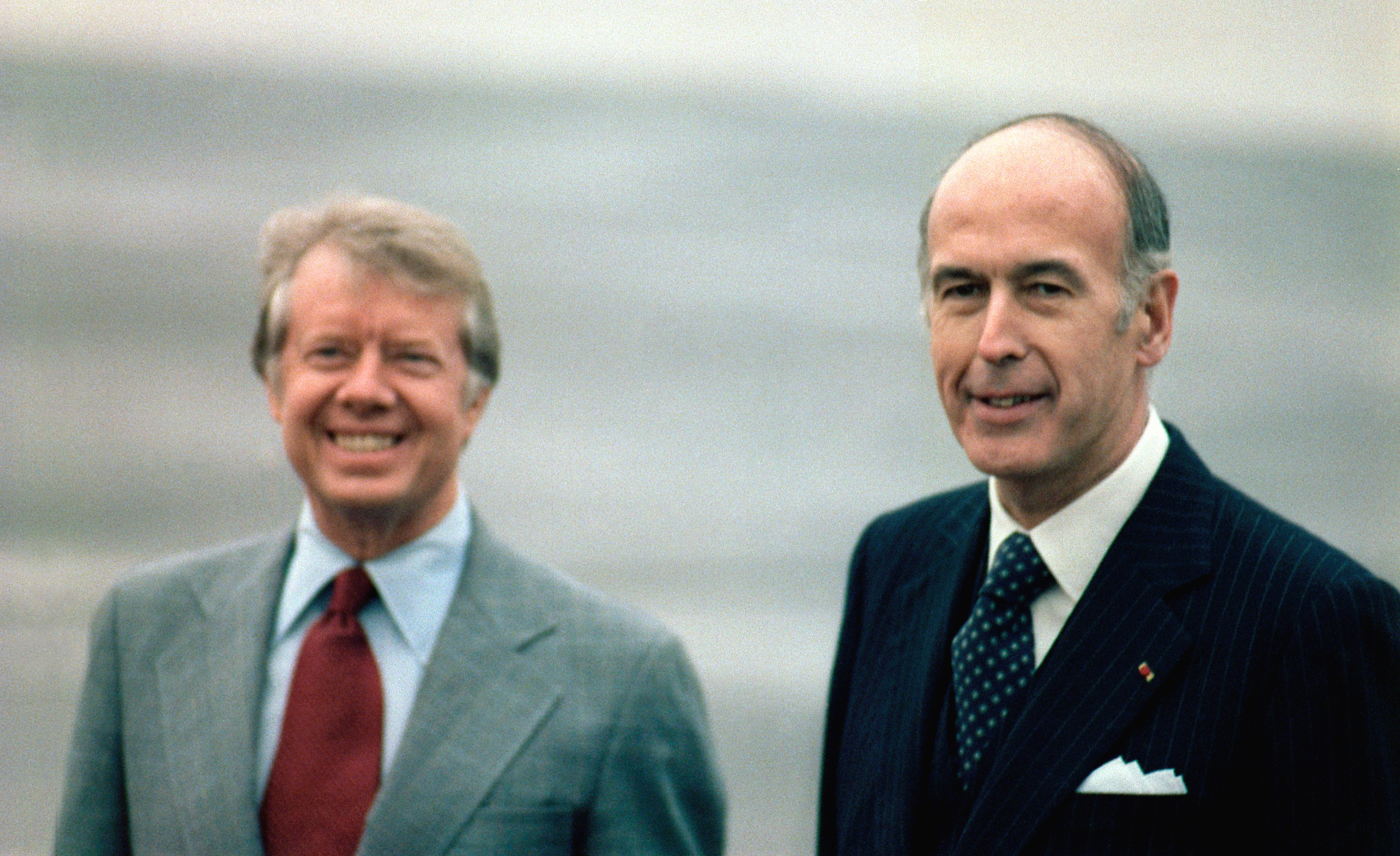
Giscard d'Estaing (right) with US president Jimmy Carter (left) in 1978

In 1974, Giscard was elected President of France, defeating Socialist candidate François Mitterrand by 425,000 votes. At 48, he was the third youngest president in French history at the time, after Louis-Napoléon Bonaparte and Jean Casimir-Perier.

In his appointments, he was innovative regarding women. He gave major cabinet positions to Simone Veil as Minister of Health and Françoise Giroud as secretary for women's affairs. Giroud worked to improve access to meaningful employment and to reconcile careers with childbearing. Veil confronted the abortion issue.

=== Domestic policy ===
On taking office, Giscard was quick to initiate reforms; they included increasing the minimum wage as well as family allowances and old-age pensions. He extended the right to political asylum, expanded health insurance to cover all Frenchmen, lowered the voting age to 18, and modernised the divorce law. On 25 September 1974, Giscard summed up his goals:

To reform the judicial system, modernize social institutions, reduce excessive inequalities of income, develop education, liberalize repressive legislation, develop culture.

He pushed for the development of the TGV high speed train network and the Minitel telephone upgrade, a precursor of the Internet. He promoted nuclear power, as a way to assert French independence, especially so after the Iranian Revolution and the following rise in the prices of oil.

Economically, Giscard's presidency saw a steady rise in personal incomes, with the purchasing power of workers going up by 29% and that of old age pensioners by 65%.

The great crisis that overwhelmed his term was a worldwide economic crisis based on rapidly rising oil prices. He turned to Prime Minister Raymond Barre in 1976, who advocated numerous complex, strict policies ("Barre Plans"). The first Barre plan emerged on 22 September 1976, with a priority to stop inflation. It included a 3-month price freeze; a reduction in the value added tax; wage controls; salary controls; a reduction of the growth in the money supply; and increases in the income tax, automobile taxes, luxury taxes and bank rates. There were measures to restore the trade balance, and support the growth of the economy and employment. Oil imports, whose price had shot up, were limited. There was special aid to exports, and an action fund was set up to aid industries. There was increased financial aid to farmers, who were suffering from a drought, and for social security. The package was not very popular, but was pursued with vigor.

Giscard initially tried to project a less monarchical image than had been the case for past French presidents. He took a ride on the Métro, ate monthly dinners with ordinary Frenchmen, and even invited garbage men from Paris to have breakfast with him in the Élysée Palace. However, when he learned that most Frenchmen were somewhat cool to this display of informality, Giscard became so aloof and distant that his opponents frequently attacked him as being too far removed from ordinary citizens.

In domestic policy, Giscard's reforms worried the conservative electorate and the Gaullist party, especially the law by Simone Veil legalising abortion. Although he said he had "deep aversion against capital punishment", Giscard claimed in his 1974 campaign that he would apply the death penalty to people committing the most heinous crimes. He did not commute three of the death sentences that he had to decide upon during his presidency. France under his administration was thus the last country in the European Community to apply the death penalty, and until the resumption of executions in the United States in 1977, the only one in the Western world. The last death sentence, bearing Giscard's signature, was executed in September 1977, the last ratified by the Court of Cassation in March 1981, but rescinded by presidential pardon after Giscard's defeat in the presidential election in May.

A rivalry arose with his Prime Minister Jacques Chirac, who resigned in 1976. Raymond Barre, called the "best economist in France" at the time, succeeded him.

Unexpectedly, the right-wing coalition won the 1978 legislative election. Nevertheless, relations with Chirac, who had founded the Rally for the Republic (RPR), became more tense. Giscard reacted by founding a centre-right confederation, the Union for French Democracy (UDF).

=== Foreign policy ===
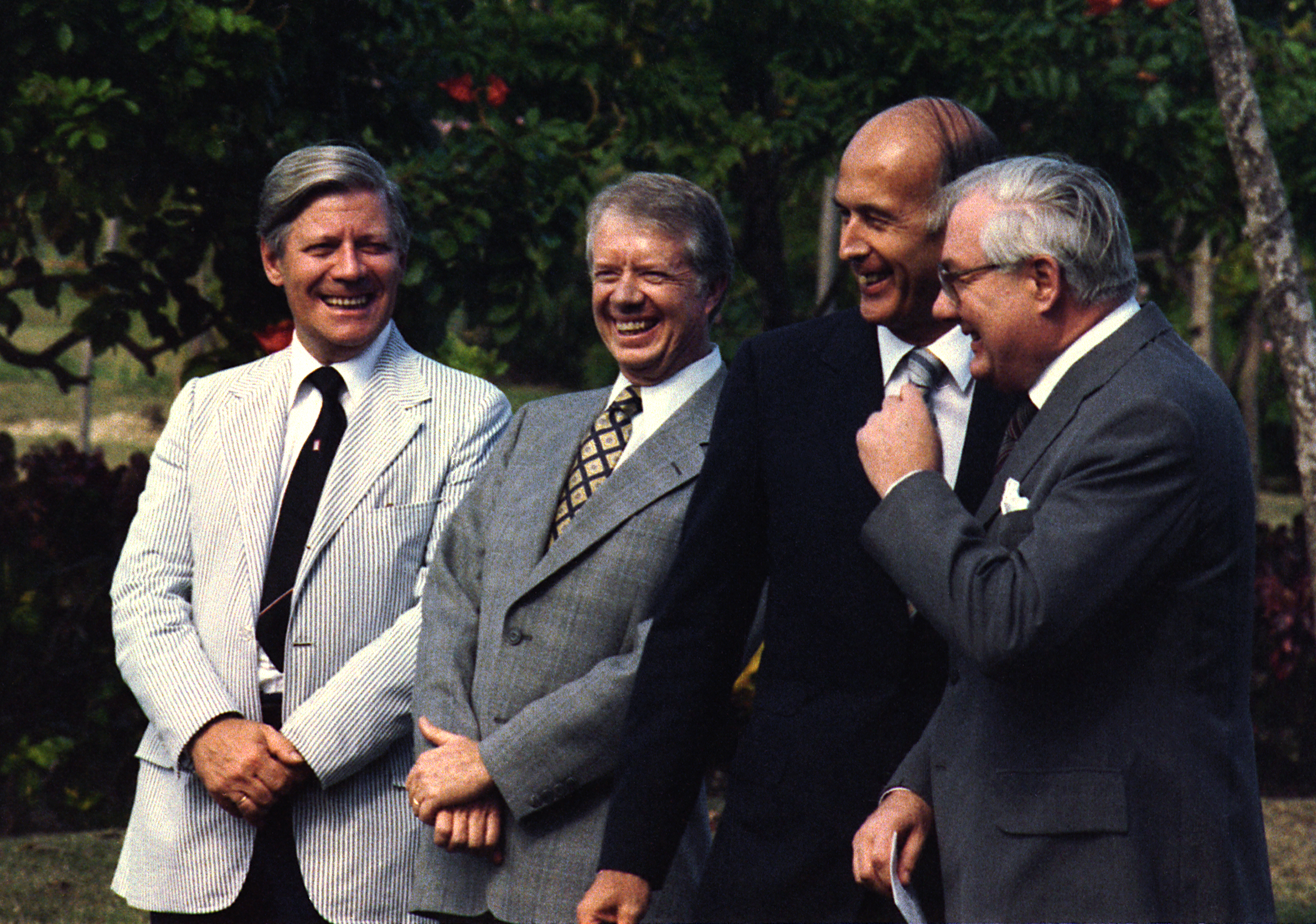
Giscard d'Estaing with German chancellor Helmut Schmidt (left), US president Jimmy Carter (second from left) and British prime minister James Callaghan (right) at the Guadeloupe Conference in 1979

Valéry Giscard d'Estaing was a close friend of West German chancellor Helmut Schmidt and together they persuaded smaller European states to hold regular summit meetings, and set up the European Monetary System. They induced the Soviet Union to establish a degree of liberalisation through the Helsinki Accords.

He promoted the creation of the European Council at the Paris Summit in December 1974. In 1975, he invited the heads of government from West Germany, Italy, Japan, the United Kingdom, and the United States to a summit in Rambouillet, to form the Group of Six major economic powers (now the G7, including Canada and the European Union).

In 1975, Giscard pressured the future King of Spain Juan Carlos I to leave Chilean dictator Augusto Pinochet out of his coronation by stating that if Pinochet attended he would not. Although France received many Chilean political refugees, Giscard d'Estaing's government secretly collaborated with Pinochet's and Videla's juntas as shown by journalist Marie-Monique Robin.

Giscard d'Estaing sought to improve Franco-Romanian ties and in 1979 visited Bucharest. In 1980 he received Romanian president Nicolae Ceaucescu as a guest in Paris.

==== Africa ====
Giscard continued de Gaulle's African policy, and sought to maintain good relations with Middle East Muslim countries so that they would continue delivering oil to France. Senegal, Ivory Coast, Gabon, and Cameroon were the largest and most reliable African allies, and received most of the investments. In 1977, in Opération Lamantin, he ordered fighter jets to deploy in Mauritania and suppress the Polisario guerrillas fighting against the Mauritanian government.

The most important advisor on African affairs during the Giscard era was René Journiac, successor of Jacques Foccart at the Secretariat for African and Malagasy Affairs, which was renamed to the "African Department" (Cellule africaine). Journiac largely continued Foccart's approach of maintaining French influence in its former colonies through a web of personal relationships with African strongmen. In 1977, documents forgotten by the mercenary Bob Denard during a coup attempt in Benin suggested that Denard's group had received support from official channels, namely through Journiac.

Most controversial was Giscard's involvement with the regime of Jean-Bédel Bokassa in the Central African Republic. Giscard was initially a friend of Bokassa, and supplied the regime. The growing unpopularity of that government led Giscard to begin distancing himself from Bokassa. In 1979's Operation Caban, French troops helped drive Bokassa out of power and restore former president David Dacko to power. This action was also controversial, particularly given that Dacko was Bokassa's cousin and had appointed Bokassa as head of the military; and unrest continued in the Central African Republic, leading to Dacko being overthrown in another coup in 1981.

The Diamonds Affair, known in France as l'affaire des diamants, was a major political scandal in the Fifth Republic. In 1973, while Minister of Finance, Giscard d'Estaing was given a number of diamonds by Bokassa. The affair was unveiled by the satirical newspaper Le Canard Enchaîné on 10 October 1979, towards the end of Giscard's presidency.

In order to defend himself, Giscard d'Estaing claimed to have sold the diamonds and donated the proceeds to the Central African Red Cross. He expected CARC authorities to confirm the story. However, the head of the local Red Cross society, Jeanne-Marie Ruth-Rolland, publicly denied the French claims. Ruth-Rolland was quickly dismissed from her post in what she described as a "coup de force" by Dacko. The saga contributed to Giscard losing his 1981 reelection bid.

==== Soviet Union ====
Giscard d'Estaing fancied himself a peace-maker with the Soviet Union and their embroilment in Afghanistan. At their summit in May 1980, he proposed an arrangement that would see Leonid Brezhnev partially withdraw his forces and thought the latter had agreed, only to be humiliated in front of his G7 partners when Brezhnev fooled him with a lie. His Socialist rival, François Mitterrand, acidly observed in the National Assembly that he was the "petit télégraphiste de Varsovie" ("little telegraph operator from Warsaw").

=== 1981 presidential election ===
In the 1981 presidential election, Giscard took a severe blow to his support when Chirac ran against him in the first round. Chirac finished third and refused to recommend that his supporters back Giscard in the runoff, though he declared that he himself would vote for Giscard. Giscard lost to Mitterrand by 3 points in the runoff and blamed Chirac for his defeat thereafter. In later years, it was widely said that Giscard loathed Chirac; certainly on many occasions Giscard criticised Chirac's policies despite supporting Chirac's governing coalition.

While campaigning for the election, Giscard was the target of an attempted assassination at Ajaccio airport on 16 April 1981. The attack was carried out by the Gravona brigade of the National Liberation Front of Corsica (FLNC). The FLNC had recently declared a ceasefire on 1 April 1981 as not to hinder the left in the upcoming elections, but disdain for Giscard and the right was still present. The Gravona brigade, led by François Santoni, placed two time bombs in the airport terminal in an area where Giscard was predicted to enter. The bombs went off two minutes after he entered the terminal, though he never entered the half of the building where the bombs were stored, and made it out unharmed. In a speech he delivered right after the attack, he condemned the action, calling it a "cowardly" attack and stated that it was an "attitude unworthy of Corsica."

Giscard's farewell speech as president became a legendary moment in French television. After delivering a solemn seven-minute address, he paused and bade a pronounced "Au revoir" before walking out as "La Marseillase" was played, leaving audiences to view his empty desk for the duration of the song.

== Post-presidency ==
=== Return to politics: 1984–2004 ===
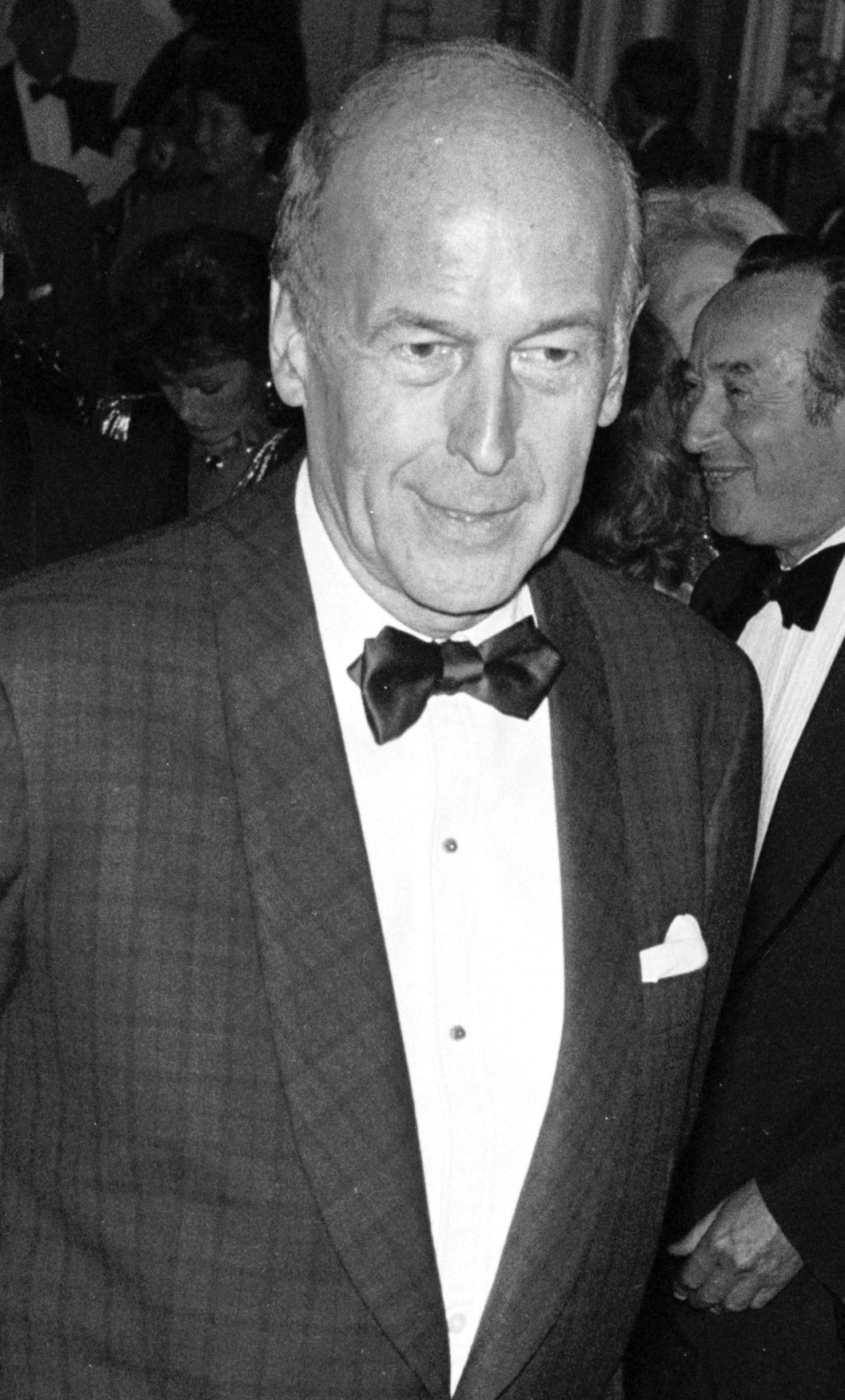
Giscard d'Estaing in 1986

After his defeat, Giscard retired temporarily from politics. In 1984, he was re-elected to his seat in the National Assembly and won the presidency of the regional council of Auvergne. He was president of the Council of European Municipalities and Regions from 1997 to 2004.

In 1982, along with his friend Gerald Ford, he co-founded the annual AEI World Forum. He also served on the Trilateral Commission after being president, writing papers with Henry Kissinger.

He hoped to become prime minister during the first "cohabitation" (1986–1988) or after the re-election of Mitterrand with the theme of "France united", but he was not chosen for this position. During the 1988 presidential campaign, he refused to choose publicly between the two right-wing candidates, his two former Prime Ministers Jacques Chirac and Raymond Barre.

He served as president of the UDF from 1988 to 1996, but he was faced with the rise of a new generation of politicians called the rénovateurs ("renovation men"). Most of the UDF politicians supported the candidacy of the RPR Prime Minister Édouard Balladur at the 1995 presidential election, but Giscard supported his old rival Jacques Chirac, who won the election. That same year Giscard suffered a setback when he lost a close election for the mayoralty of Clermont-Ferrand.

In 2000, he made a parliamentary proposal to reduce the length of a presidential term from seven to five years, a proposal that eventually won its referendum proposal by President Chirac. Following his retirement from the National Assembly his son Louis Giscard d'Estaing was elected in his former constituency.

=== Retirement: 2004–2020 ===
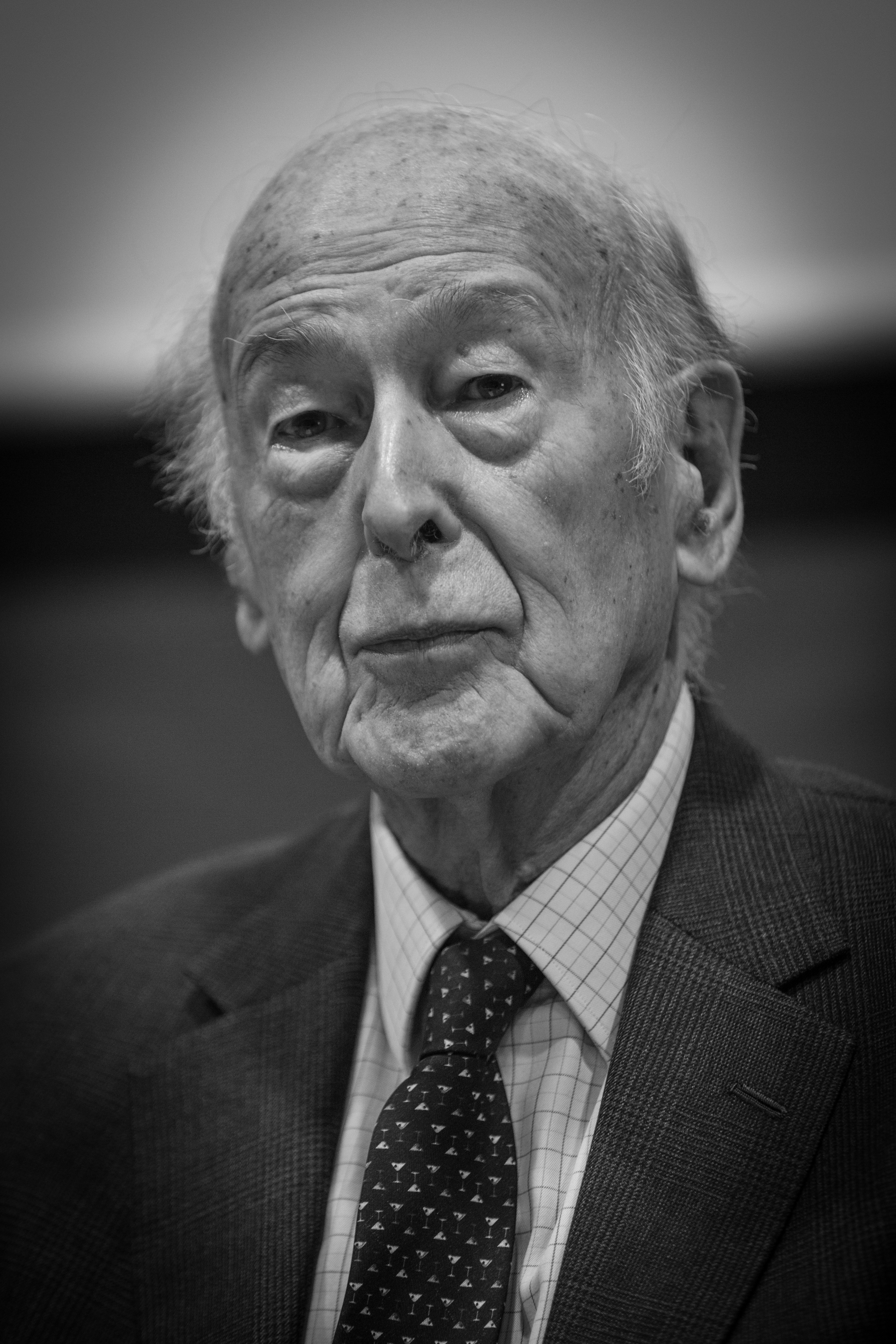
Giscard d'Estaing in 2015

In 2003, Valéry Giscard d'Estaing was admitted to the Académie française.

Following his narrow defeat in the regional elections of March 2004, marked by the victory of the left wing in 21 of 22 regions, he decided to leave partisan politics and to take his seat on the Constitutional Council as a former president of the country. Some of his actions there, such as his campaign in favour of the treaty establishing the European Constitution, were criticised as unbecoming to a member of this council, which should embody nonpartisanship and should not appear to favour one political option over the other. Indeed, the question of the membership of former presidents in the council was raised at this point, with some suggesting that it should be replaced by a life membership in the Senate.

On 19 April 2007, he endorsed Nicolas Sarkozy for the presidential election. He supported the creation of the centrist Union of Democrats and Independents in 2012 and the introduction of same-sex marriage in France in 2013. In 2016, he supported former Prime Minister François Fillon in The Republicans presidential primaries.

A 2014 poll suggested that 64% of the French thought he had been a good president. He was considered to be an honest and competent politician, but also a distant man.

On 21 January 2017, with a lifespan of 33,226 days, he surpassed Émile Loubet (1838–1929) in terms of longevity, and became the oldest former president in French history.

== European activities ==
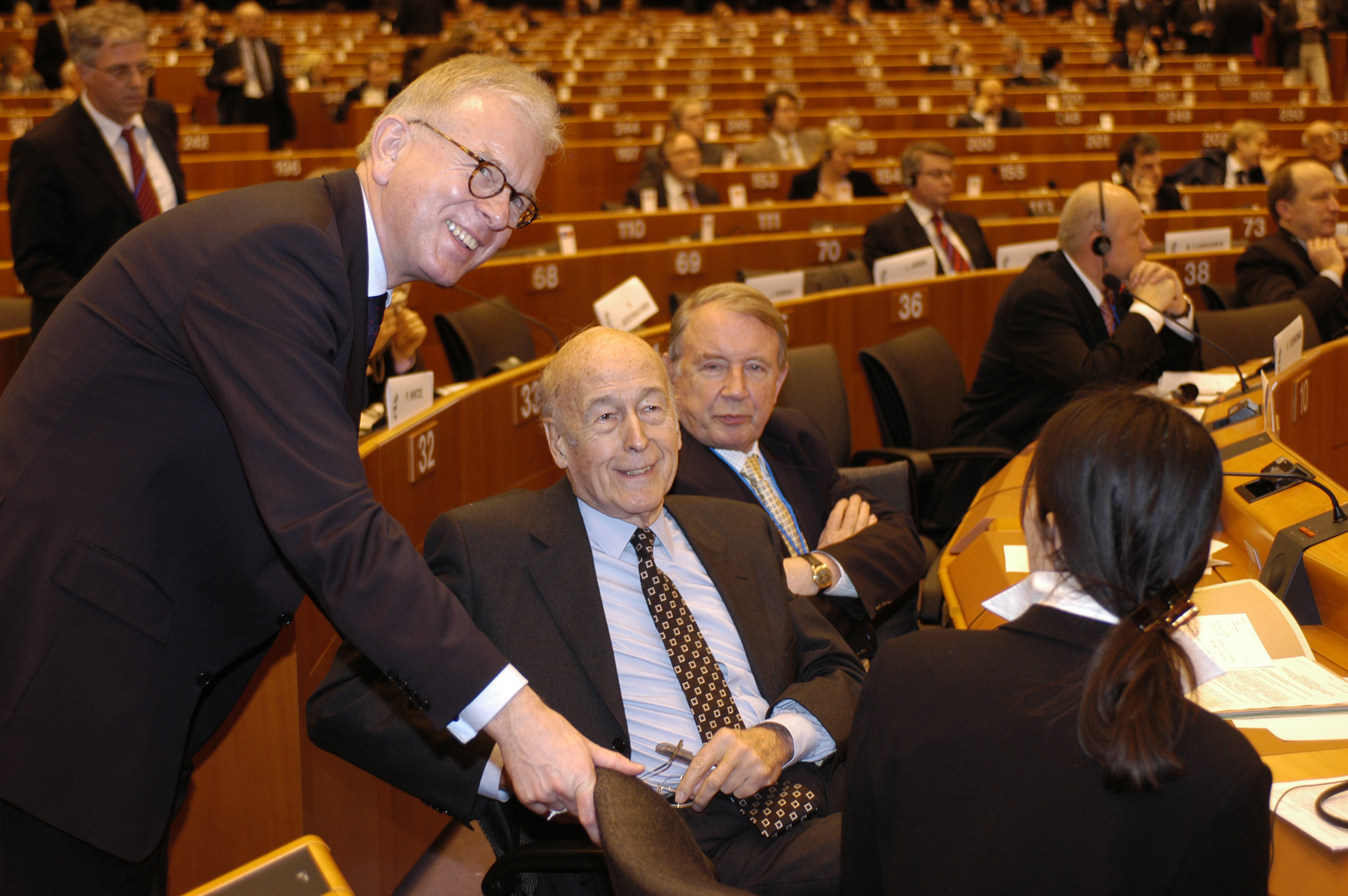
Giscard d'Estaing (centre) at the EPP Congress in Brussels, 2004

Throughout his political career, Giscard was a proponent of a greater amount of European integration in the European Community (in what would become the European Union), mentioning the need for "decisive progress in the organization of Europe". He was the main proponent of the Committee of Wise Men responsible for studying the adjustments to the European institutions that needed to be made after the development of the EMS, the first European elections and its enlargement. In 1978, he was the target of Jacques Chirac's Call of Cochin, denouncing his "party of the foreigners".

From 1989 to 1993, Giscard served as a member of the European Parliament. From 1989 to 1991, he was also chairman of the Liberal and Democratic Reformist Group.

From 2001 to 2004, he served as president of the Convention on the Future of Europe. On 29 October 2004, the heads of government of the European Union gathered in Rome, approved and signed the European Constitution based on a draft strongly influenced by Giscard's work at the convention. Although the Constitution was rejected by French voters in May 2005, Giscard continued to actively lobby for its passage in other EU states.

Giscard d'Estaing attracted international attention at the time of the June 2008 Irish vote on the Lisbon Treaty. In an article for Le Monde in June 2007, published in English translation by The Irish Times, he said that a "divide and ratify" approach, whereby "public opinion would be led to adopt, without knowing it, the proposals we dare not present to them directly", would be unworthy and would reinforce the idea that the construction of Europe was being organised behind the public's backs by lawyers and diplomats; the quotation was taken out of context by prominent supporters of a "no" vote and distorted to give the impression that Giscard was advocating such a deception, instead of repudiating it.

In 2008, he became the honorary president of the Atomium - European Institute for Science and Democracy. On 27 November 2009, Giscard publicly launched the institute during its first conference, held at the European Parliament, declaring: "European intelligence could be at the very root of the identity of the European people." A few days before he had signed, together with the President of the institute Michelangelo Baracchi Bonvicini, the European Manifesto of Atomium.

== Personal life ==
Giscard's name was often shortened to "VGE" by the French media. He was also known simply as l'Ex, particularly during the time he was the only living former president.

On 17 December 1952, Giscard married Anne-Aymone Sauvage de Brantes. The couple had four children.

Giscard's private life was the source of many rumours at both national and international level. His family did not live in the presidential Élysée Palace, and The Independent reported on his affairs with women. In 1974, Le Monde reported that he used to leave a sealed letter stating his whereabouts in case of emergency.

In May 2020, Giscard was accused of groping a German journalist's buttocks during an interview in 2018. He denied the accusation.

=== Possession of the Estaing castle ===
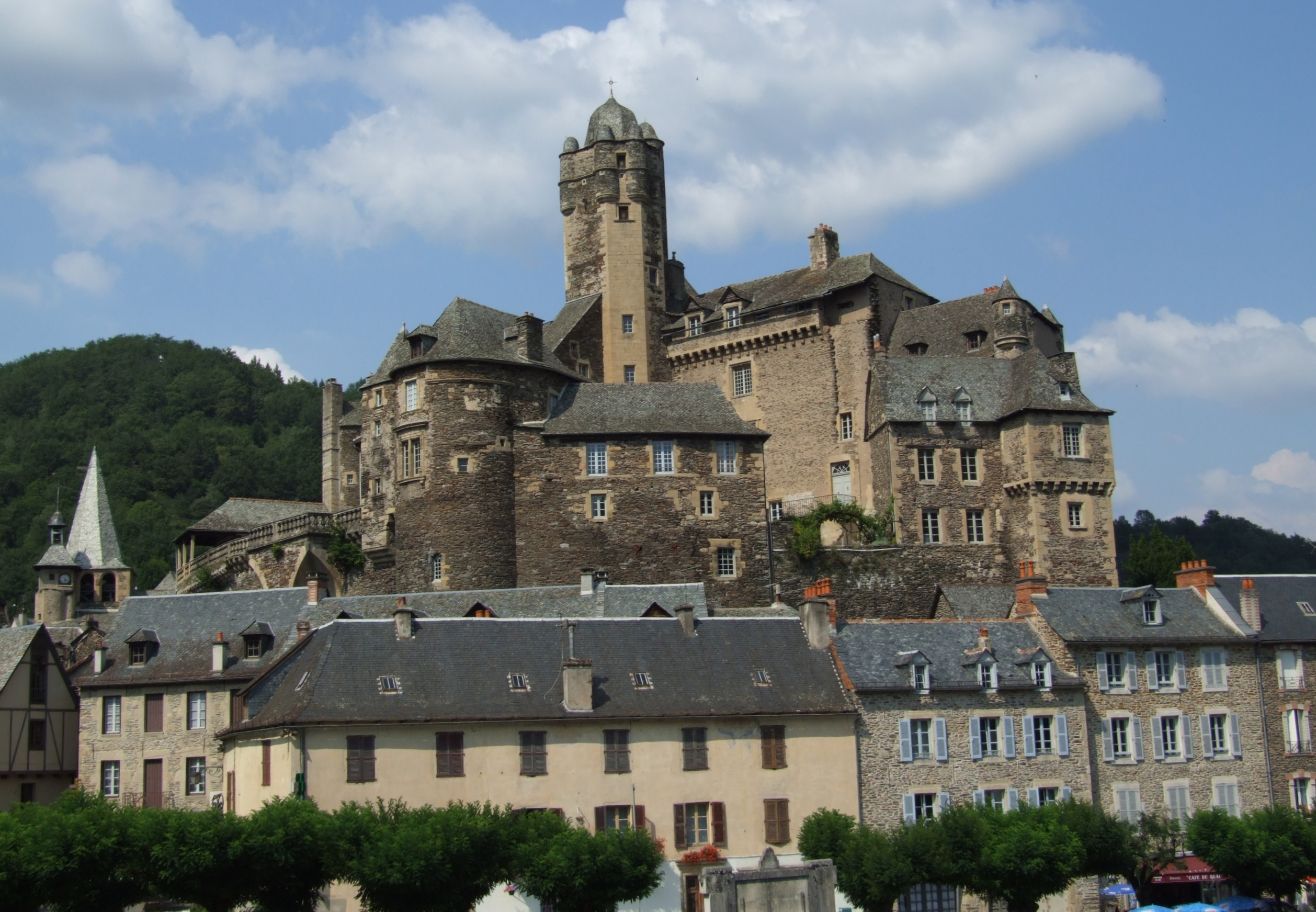
The Estaing castle in 2007

In 2005 he and his brother bought the castle of Estaing, formerly a possession of the above-mentioned Admiral d'Estaing who was beheaded in 1794. The brothers never used the castle as a residence but for its symbolic value, and they explained the purchase, supported by the local municipality, as an act of patronage. However, a number of major newspapers in several countries questioned their motives and some hinted at self-appointed nobility and a usurped historical identity. The castle was put up for sale in 2008 for €3 million and is now the property of the Valéry Giscard d'Estaing Foundation.

=== 2009 novel ===
Giscard wrote his second romantic novel, published on 1 October 2009 in France, entitled The Princess and the President. It tells the story of French President Jacques-Henri Lambertye having a romantic liaison with Patricia, Princess of Cardiff of the British royal family. This fuelled rumours that the piece of fiction was based on a real-life liaison between Giscard and Diana, Princess of Wales. He later stressed that the story was entirely made up and no such affair had actually occurred.

== Illness and death ==
On 14 September 2020, Giscard d'Estaing was hospitalised with breathing complications at the Hôpital Européen Georges-Pompidou in Paris. He was later diagnosed with a lung infection. He was hospitalised again on 15 November, but was discharged on 20 November.

Giscard d'Estaing died from complications attributed to COVID-19 on 2 December 2020, at the age of 94. His family said that his funeral would be held in "strict intimacy". His funeral and burial took place on 5 December in Authon with forty people attending the event.

President Emmanuel Macron released a statement describing Giscard d'Estaing as a "servant of the state, a politician of progress and freedom"; the president declared a national day of mourning for Giscard d'Estaing on 9 December. Former presidents Nicolas Sarkozy and François Hollande, 2017 presidential candidate Marine Le Pen, German chancellor Angela Merkel, and European Union leaders Charles Michel, David Sassoli, and Ursula von der Leyen all issued statements praising Giscard's efforts in modernising France and strengthening relations with the European Union.

== Legacy ==
Giscard d'Estaing was seen as the pioneer in modernising France and strengthening the European Union. He introduced numerous small social reforms, such as reducing the voting age by three years, allowing divorce by common consent, and legalising abortion. He was committed to supporting innovative technology, and focused on creating the TGV high-speed rail network, promoting nuclear power, and developing the telephone system.

Despite his ambitions, he was unable to resolve the great economic crisis of his term, a worldwide economic recession caused primarily by a very rapid increase in oil prices. His foreign policy was remembered for his close relationship with West German Chancellor Helmut Schmidt, and together they persuaded Europe's lesser economic powers to collaborate and form new permanent organisations, especially the European Monetary System and the G-7 system.

In December 2022, Anne-Aymone Giscard d'Estaing put up some of her late husband's art and furniture for sale at Hotel Drouot: the collection included a Rodin bust of Gustav Mahler.

== Honours and awards ==
Giscard d'Estaing's coat of arms as a knight of the Swedish Order of the Seraphim

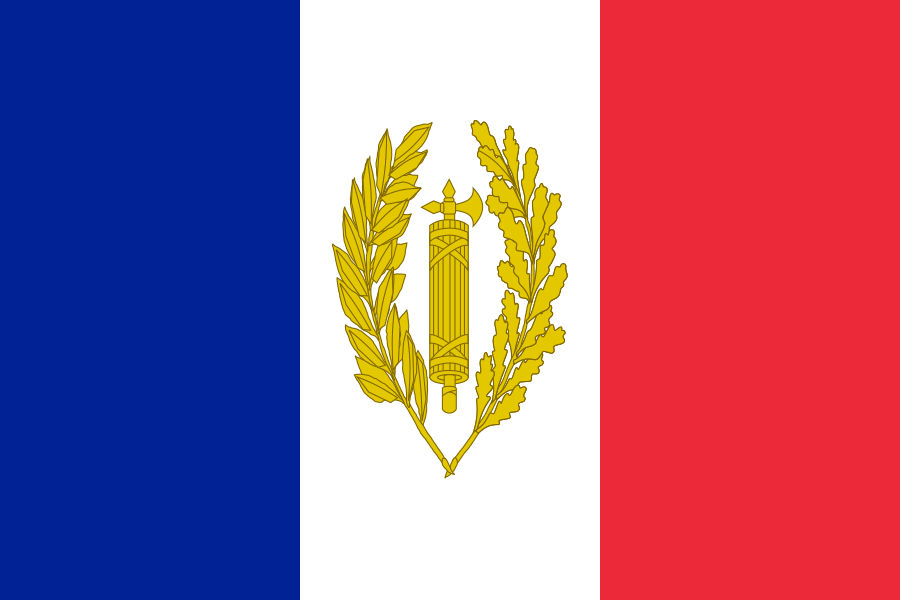
Presidential standard of Valéry Giscard d'Estaing

=== National honours ===
- Grand-croix (and former Grand Master) of the Legion of Honour
- Grand-croix (and former Grand Master) of the Ordre National du Mérite
- Croix de Guerre 1939–1945

=== European honours ===
In 2003, he received the Charlemagne Prize of the German city of Aachen. He was also a Knight of Malta.

=== Foreign honours ===
- Abu Dhabi: 1st Class of the Order of Al-Nahayyan (1980)
- Bahrain: Grand Collar of the Order Al Khalifa (1980)
- Brazil: Grand Collar of the Order of the Southern Cross (26 April 1976)
- Brazil: Collar of the Order of Rio Branco (1978)
- Brazil: Medal of the National Congress of Brazil (1978)
- Cameroon: Gran Cross of the Order of Valour (1979)
- Central African Republic: Gran Cross of the Order of Central African Merit (1976)
- Chad: Collar of the National Order of Chad (1974)
- Colombia: Gran Cross of the Order of Boyaca (1979)
- Denmark: Knight of the Order of the Elephant (12 October 1978)
- Egypt: Collar of the Order of the Nile (1975)
- Finland: Grand Cross with Collar of the Order of the White Rose of Finland (1 June 1980)
- Gabon: Grand Cross of the Order of the Equatorial Star (1976)
- West Germany: Grand Cross of the Order of Merit of the Federal Republic of Germany (1975)
- Germany: Medal of the Order of Merit of Baden-Württemberg (2005)
- Greece: Grand Cross of the Order of the Redeemer (1975)
- Guinea: Grand Cross of the National Order of Merit (Guinea) (1978)
- Iran: Member 1st class of the Order of Pahlavi (1976)
- Italy: Knight Grand Cross of the Order of Merit of the Italian Republic (10/1973)
- Ivory Coast: Grand Cross of the National Order of the Ivory Coast (1976)
- Jordan: Collar of the Order of Al-Hussein bin Ali (1980)
- Saudi Arabia: Collar of the Order of King Abdulaziz (1977)
- Kuwait: Collar of the Order of Mubarak the Great (1980)
- Luxembourg: Knight of the Order of the Gold Lion of the House of Nassau (1978)
- Mali: Grand Cross of the National Order of Mali (1977)
- Mexico: Collar of the Order of the Aztec Eagle (1979)
- Morocco: Special Class of the Order of Muhammad (1975)
- Monaco: Knight Grand Cross of the Order of Saint-Charles (1976)
- Norway: Grand Cross of the Order of St. Olav (1962)
- Oman: Collar of the Order of Oman (1980)
- Panama: Grand Cross of the Order of Vasco Núñez de Balboa (1979)
- Poland: Grand Cordon of the Order of Merit of the Republic of Poland (1975)
- Portugal: Grand Collar of the Order of Saint James of the Sword (14 October 1975)
- Portugal: Grand Collar of the Order of Prince Henry (21 October 1978)
- Qatar: Collar of the Collar of the Order of Independence (1980)
- Romania: Medal of the Order of the Star of the Romanian Socialist Republic (1979)
- Rwanda: Grand Cross of the Order of Milles Collines (1977)
- Senegal: Grand Cross of the National Order of the Lion (1978)
- Spain: Knight Grand Cross of the Order of Isabella the Catholic (1963)
- Spain: Knight of the Collar of the Order of Isabella the Catholic (1976)
- Spain: Knight of the Collar of the Order of Charles III (1978)
- Sudan: Grand Cordon of the National Order of the Republic of Sudan (1977)
- Sweden: Knight of the Order of the Seraphim (6 June 1980)
- Togo: Grand Cross of the Order of Mono (1980)
- Tunisia: Grand Cordon of the Order of Independence (1975)
- United Kingdom: Honorary Knight Grand Cross of the Order of the Bath (22 June 1976)
- United States: Bronze Star Medal (1945)
- Venezuela: Collar of the Order of the Liberator (1980)
- Yemen: Grand Cordon of the Order of the Republic of Yemen (1980)
- Yugoslavia: Great Star of the Order of the Yugoslav Star (1976)
- Zaire: Grand Cordon of the National Order of the Leopard (1975)

=== Other honours ===
- Sovereign Order of Malta: Bailiff Grand Cross of Honour and Devotion of the Sovereign Military Order of Malta
- Sovereign Order of Malta: Grand Cross pro Merito Melitensi

=== International awards ===
- Nansen Refugee Award, 1979.

=== Heraldry ===
Giscard d'Estaing was granted a coat of arms by Queen Margrethe II of Denmark upon his appointment to the Order of the Elephant. He was also granted a coat of arms by King Carl XVI Gustav of Sweden, for his induction as a Knight of the Seraphim.

== Sources ==
- Thody, Philip (31 January 2002). The Fifth French Republic: Presidents, Politics and Personalities: A Study of French Political Culture. Routledge. ISBN 978-1-134-66154-1.

National Assembly of France
Proportional representation	Member for Puy-de-Dôme; 1956–1958	Constituency abolished
New constituency	Member for Puy-de-Dôme; 1986–1988	Constituency abolished
Preceded by New constituency (1958); Guy Fric (1962, 1967); Jean Morellon (1973); Claude Wolff (1984)	Member for Puy-de-Dôme's 2nd constituency 1958–1959; 1962–1963; 1967–1969; 1973; 1984–1986	Succeeded by Guy Fric (1959, 1963); Jean Morellon (1969, 1973); Constituency abolished (1986)
New constituency	Member for Puy-de-Dôme's 3rd constituency 1988–1989	Succeeded by Claude Wolff
Preceded by Claude Wolff	Member for Puy-de-Dôme's 3rd constituency 1993–2002	Succeeded by Louis Giscard d'Estaing
European Parliament
Proportional representation	Member of the European Parliament for France; 1989–1993	Proportional representation
Political offices
New office	Secretary of State for Finance; 1959–1962	Succeeded by Max Fléchet
Preceded by Pierre Chatrousse	Mayor of Chamalières; 1967–1974	Succeeded by Claude Wolff
Preceded by Wilfrid Baumgartner	Minister of Finance and Economics Affairs; 1962–1966	Succeeded by Michel Debré
Preceded by François-Xavier Ortoli	Minister of Economy and Finance; 1969–1974	Succeeded by Jean-Pierre Fourcade
Preceded by Alain Poher (Acting)	President of France; 1974–1981	Succeeded by François Mitterrand
Preceded by Maurice Pourchon	President of the Regional Council of Auvergne; 1986–2004	Succeeded by Pierre-Joël Bonté
Party political offices
New political party	President of the Independent Republicans; 1966–1974	Succeeded by Michel Poniatowski
Preceded by Jean Lecanuet	President of the Union for French Democracy; 1988–1996	Succeeded by François Léotard
Regnal titles
Preceded by Alain Poher (Acting)	Co-Prince of Andorra; 1974–1981; With: Joan Martí i Alanis	Succeeded by François Mitterrand
Preceded by Joan Martí i Alanis	Co-Prince of Andorra; 1974–1981; With: Joan Martí i Alanis	Succeeded by Joan Martí i Alanis
Catholic Church titles
Preceded by Georges Pompidou	Honorary Canon of the Archbasilica of Saint John Lateran; 1974–1981	Succeeded by François Mitterrand
Diplomatic posts
New office	Chair of the G6; 1975	Succeeded by Gerald Ford
Academic offices
Preceded by Aleksander Kwaśniewski	Invocation Speaker of the College of Europe; 2002	Succeeded by Joschka Fischer
