= Jean-Pierre Fourcade =

French politician (born 1929)

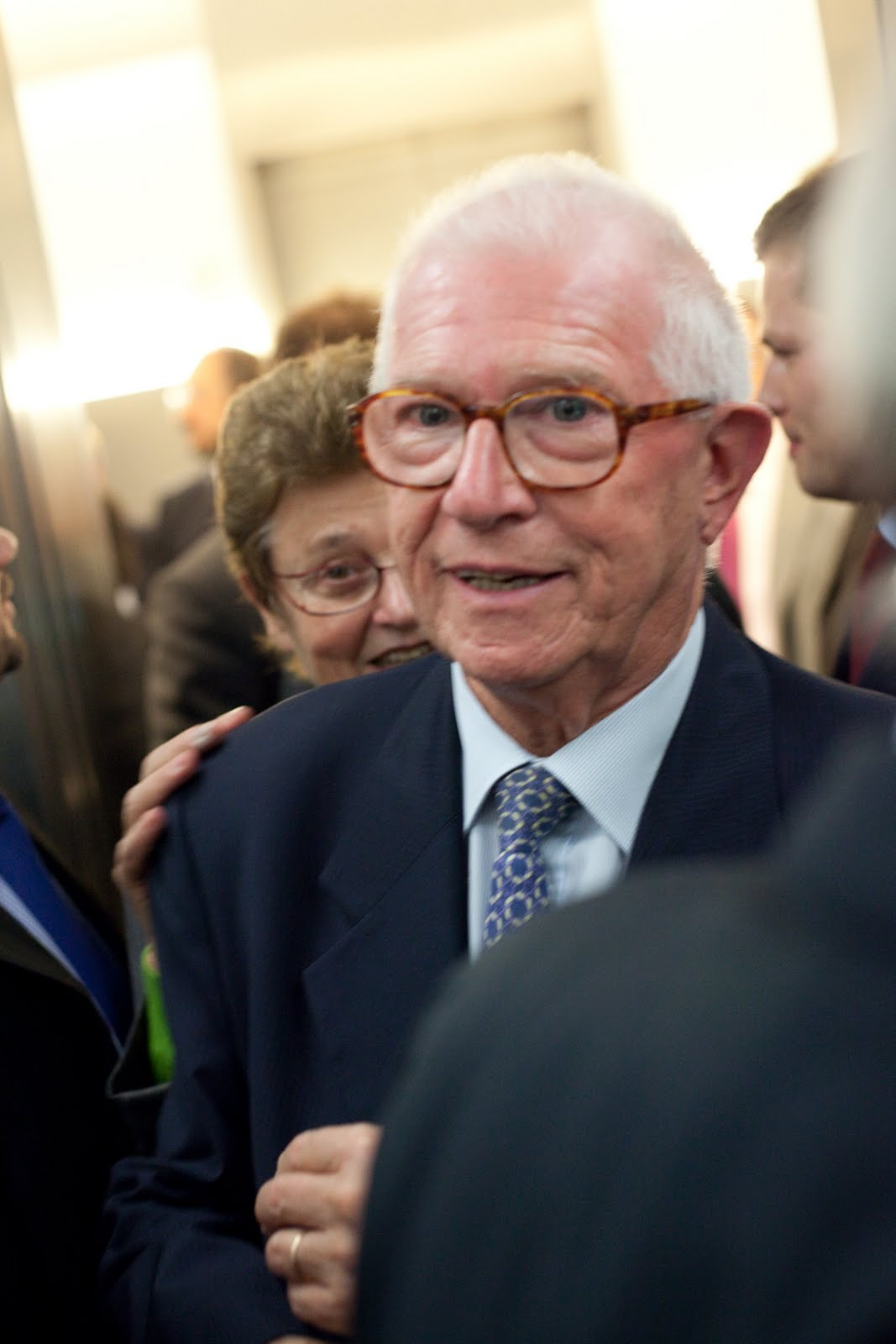

French Minister of the Economy
- In office 1974–1976
- President: Valéry Giscard d'Estaing
- Prime Minister: Raymond Barre
- Preceded by: Valéry Giscard d'Estaing
- Succeeded by: Raymond Barre

Member of the French Senate for Hauts-de-Seine
- In office 1977–2011

Mayor of Boulogne-Billancourt
- In office 1995–2007

Personal details
- Born: 18 October 1929 (age 96) Marmande, France
- Party: The Republicans
- Education: Sciences Po Bordeaux

Jean-Pierre Fourcade (French pronunciation: [ʒɑ̃ pjɛʁ fuʁkad]; born 18 October 1929) is a French politician and a member of the Senate of France. He represents the Hauts-de-Seine department and is a member of the Union for a Popular Movement Party. He is former minister for Economics and Finance (1974–1976), and equipment (1976–1981).

== Bibliography ==
- Page on the Senate website
