= List of écoles supérieures de commerce =

An école supérieure de commerce is a French business school.

== List ==
- MBA ESG
- INSEEC
- Kedge Business School - Created by the 2013 merger of BEM (Bordeaux Management School) and Euromed Management (Marseille)
- École supérieure de commerce de Montpellier
- École supérieure de commerce de Paris (Merged with EAP and formed ESCP Europe)
- ESSEC
- ESCEM
- HEC Paris
- ICN Nancy
- ESSCA
- IESEG
- ICN
- Audencia Business School
- EM LYON
- École supérieure de commerce de Reims - merged in 2013 with the École supérieure de commerce de Rouen to create NEOMA Business School
- École supérieure de commerce de Rennes
- École supérieure de commerce de Rouen - merged in 2013 with the École supérieure de commerce de Reims to create NEOMA Business School
- École supérieure de commerce de Grenoble
- Ecole Supérieure de Commerce de Pau
- Institut Supérieure de Gestion - Paris (ISG)
- ESC Clermont
