= Isli =

Isli or ISLI may refer to:

- Isli Hidi (born 1990), Albanian footballer
- Rozman Isli (born 1963), Malaysian politician
- Isli, a lake in Morocco, near Imilchil
- Isli trout, a species of trout
- WASP-161b, or Isli, an exoplanet orbiting WASP-161
- Institut Supérieur de Logistique Industrielle
- International Standard Link Identifier

== See also ==
- Isti Bolagh, also known as Isli Bulaq, a village in Iran
