= Norman A. Solomon =

Norman A. Solomon is Dean of the Charles F. Dolan School of Business at Fairfield University located in Fairfield, Connecticut and an expert in labor negotiations.

Solomon has initiated student exchange programs with several European universities while at Fairfield University. He has served as a Jury President at Institut de Formation Internationale (IFI)'s International Business Panel for three years and in 2003 and 2004 lectured, by special invitation, at the Durham University Business School in the United Kingdom. Solomon has also served on several accreditation teams for AACSB International.

He has co-authored a text on labor relations and he has authored many scholarly articles. Solomon teaches a graduate course on negotiations at the Dolan School.

== Education ==
Solomon earned a bachelor's degree from Cornell University in industrial and labor relations; and a master's degree and doctorate in industrial relations from the University of Wisconsin–Madison. He also holds a certificate in management and leadership in education from Harvard University.
