= Roy Thurik =

Dutch economist

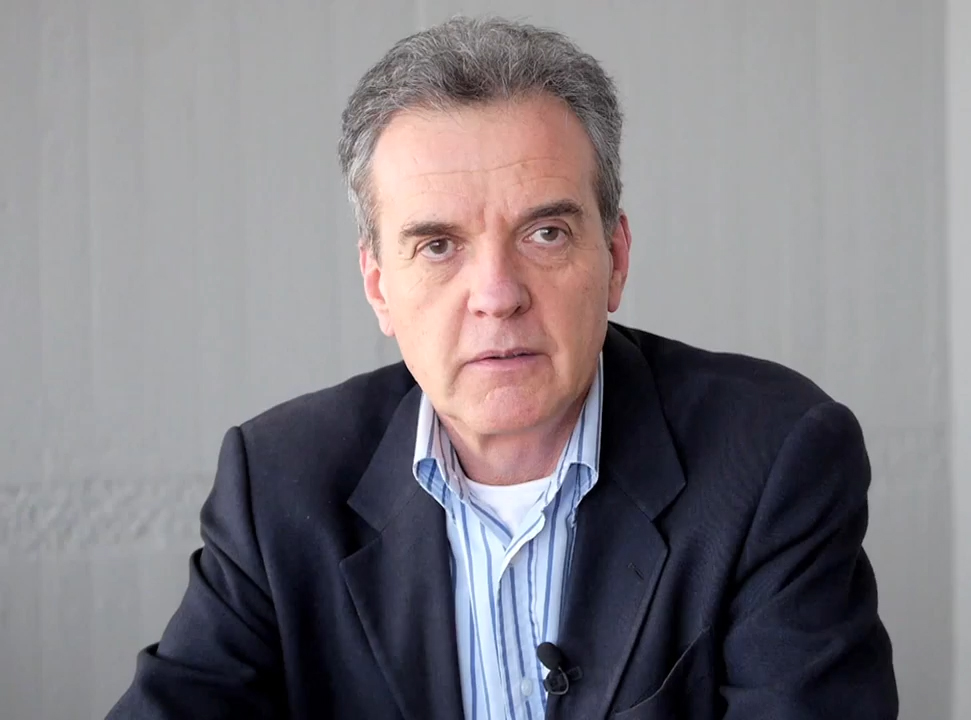
- Roy Thurik in 2014
- Born: 3 April 1952 (age 74); Rotterdam, Netherlands

Academic background
- Education: Erasmus University Rotterdam
- Doctoral advisor: Johannes Koerts

Academic work
- Discipline: Entrepreneurship
- Institutions: Montpellier Business School; Erasmus School of Economics; Free University in Amsterdam
- Website: personal.eur.nl/thurik/; Information at IDEAS / RePEc

Aadrian Roy Thurik (born 3 April 1952) is a Dutch economist who is professor of Entrepreneurship and Economics at Montpellier Business School in France. He is also an emeritus professor at both the Free University in Amsterdam and Erasmus University Rotterdam.
