= Badge (disambiguation) =

Badge or BADGE may refer to:

- Badge, a display indicating a special accomplishment, or as a symbol of authority:
  - Access badge, a credential used to gain entry to an area
  - Digital badge, an indicator of accomplishment, skill, quality or interest in various learning environments
  - Heraldic badge, a display of allegiance to a royal figure
  - Web badge, a small image used on websites to promote a web standard, product, or terms of service
  - Pin-back button, in the United Kingdom
  - Rebadging, the practice of applying a new brand or trademark to an existing product
  - Achievement (video gaming), a secondary goal within a video game
  - Electronic badge, a device to show a handle or software

== Arts and entertainment ==
- "Badge" (song) by the 1960s rock group Cream
- "Badge" (Law & Order: Criminal Intent episode), 2001 US TV episode
- The Badge, a 2002 American film
- James Badge Dale, American actor

== Other uses ==
- Bisphenol A diglycidyl ether, a component of epoxy resin
- Bilan d'aptitude délivré par les grandes écoles, an academic degree in France

== See also ==
- Stinking badges, a film quote
- Category:Badges
