= Georges Klenklé =

French entrepreneur

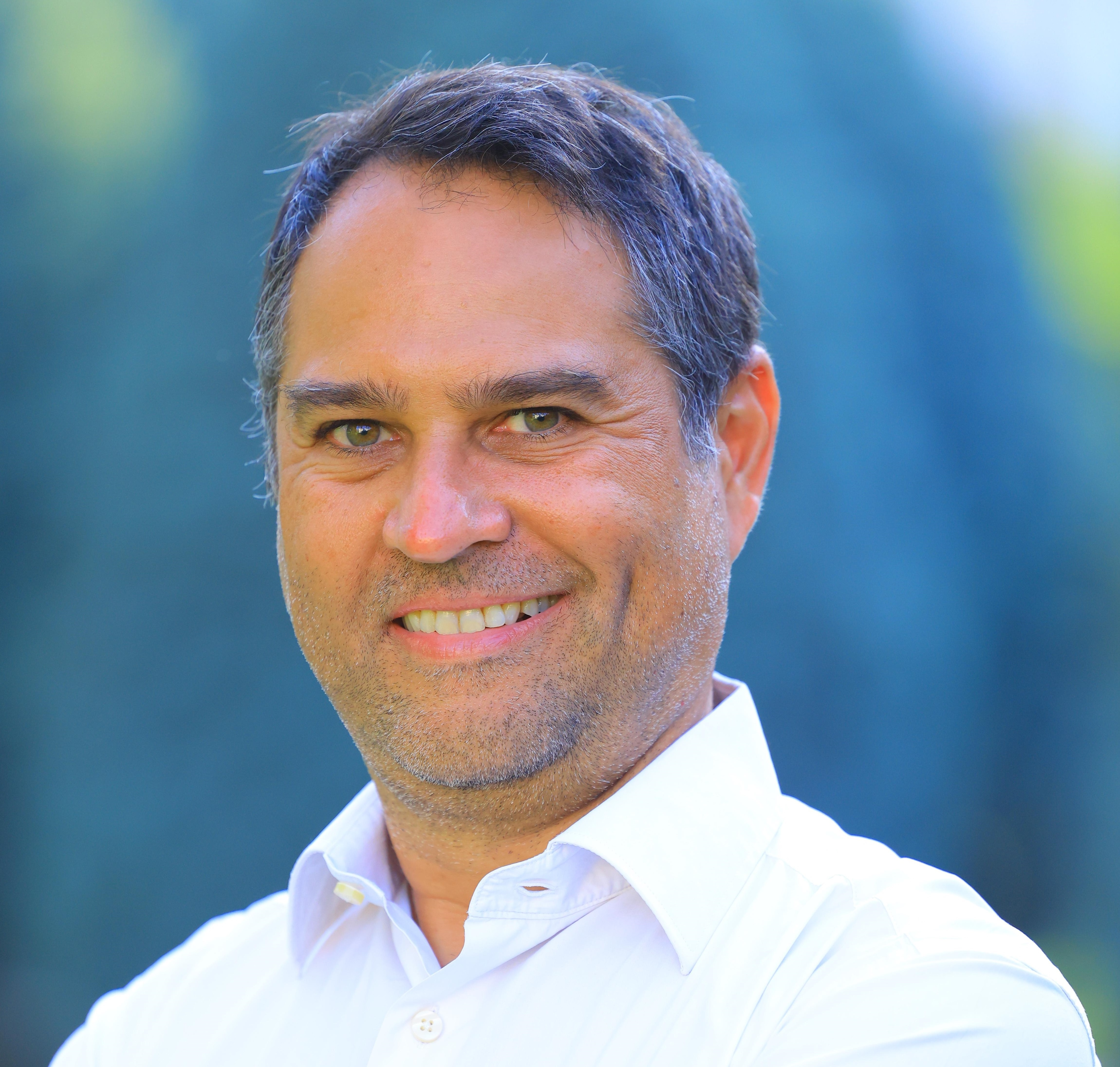
- Education: KEDGE Business School
- Occupations: Entrepreneur, business executive
- Years active: 1995–present
- Employer(s): Eugeka, FreemiumPlay
- Known for: Co-founder of Degetel, President of Kedge Alumni

Georges Klenklé is a French entrepreneur and business executive in the technology and new media sectors. He is the co-founder of Degetel, a consulting and engineering company. Additionally, he serves as the president and owner of the private investment fund Eugeka, which focuses on the new technologies sector. Klenkle is also a co-founder of FreemiumPlay.

In May 2021, he became President of Kedge Alumni at KEDGE Business School.

== Biography ==
Georges Klenklé graduated from KEDGE Business School, where he pursued a master's degree in management with a specialization in logistics. He completed his studies from 1992 to 1995 and has maintained ties with KEDGE Business School, becoming a member of the Fondation KEDGE in March 2010.

=== Career ===
Following the completion of his education, Klenklé started his career as a Software Engineer at ArcelorMittal in Germany from January 1995 to March 1997. He returned to Paris in March 1997 to assume the role of Business Manager at Sopra Steria. Continuing his career in France, Klenklé joined Paris-based multinational information technology (IT) services and consulting company Capgemini (formerly Transiciel) as a Business Manager in 1998.

In 1999, Klenklé co-founded Degetel, where he served as Chief Operating Officer (COO). Degetel is a consulting and engineering company specializing in the digital transformation of companies through digital strategy, digital studio (UX, UI, design), digital factory (web, mobile, IoT), digital transformation management, digital performance (AI, big data, cloud). In early 2020, Klenklé handed over Degetel to the Technology and Strategy Group. By then, the company had achieved a turnover of 46 million euros and had a team of 500 employees spread over 3 countries and 6 locations.

In September 2012, he founded Eugeka, a private investment fund focusing on the new technologies sector, where he assumed the role of president of the company.

Additionally, Klenklé co-founded FreemiumPlay with Nicolas Yvelin in August 2018. FreemiumPlay is a company that provides digital gift cards specifically for leisure activities. In September 2023, a Bordeaux-based startup FreemiumPlay raised 2 million euros with the help of Elevation Capital Partners investment fund.

In May 2021, he became President of Kedge Alumni at KEDGE Business School.
