= École supérieure de commerce =

Type of business school in France

An École Supérieure de Commerce or ESC is a French business school at the university level. Historically, however, these schools were not recognized by the state as university level.

In most instances, such a school is a private Grande École de Commerce (an elite business school) operated by a local chamber of commerce and industry, also abbreviated as Sup de Co'. Grande Écoles de Commerce are traditionally known for producing many, if not most, of the leading French business executives and government officials.

The Grandes Écoles (literally in French "grand schools" or "elite schools") of France are higher education establishments outside the mainstream framework of the public universities system. Unlike French public universities which have an obligation to accept all candidates of the same region who hold a baccalauréat, the selection criteria of grandes écoles rests mainly on competitive written and oral exams, usually undertaken by students from dedicated preparatory classes, although this is not always the case. They do not have a large student body (3,000 at the largest establishment; most have a few hundred students each year) and are generally focused on a single subject area, such as business or engineering.

Most of the French business schools have the term ESC in their name such as ESCP Europe (Ecole Supérieure de Commerce de Paris Europe). Some French business schools do not include the term ESC in the school name e.g. HEC Paris, EM Lyon, Grenoble École de Management (GEM), Audencia, Neoma Business School and Skema Business School. Some schools use an adapted version of ESC e.g. ESSEC (École supérieure des sciences économiques et commerciales).

== See also ==
- List of écoles supérieures de commerce
- Education in France
