= 2011 French cantonal elections =

Cantonal elections to elect half the membership of the general councils of France's 100 departments were held on 20 and 27 March 2011.

== Electoral system ==
The cantonal elections use a two-round system similar to that employed in the country's legislative elections.

- Councillors are elected from single-member constituencies (cantons).
- A candidate securing the votes of at least 25% of the canton's registered voters and more than 50% of the total number of votes actually cast in the first round of voting is thereby elected. If no candidate satisfies these conditions, then a second round of voting is held one week later.
- Entitled to present themselves in the second round are the two candidates who received the highest number of votes in the first round, plus any other candidate or candidates who received the votes of at least 12.5% of those registered to vote in the canton. This threshold used to be set at 10% and was modified for this election.
- In the second round, the candidate receiving the highest number of votes is elected.

== Context ==
French cantonal elections are usually paired with another election; for example, they were paired with the regional elections in 1998, the municipal elections in 2001, the regional elections in 2004, and the municipal elections in 2008. The 2011 elections were the first cantonal elections since 1992 not to be paired with another election.

Since cantonal councillors are electors for the senatorial elections, and considering that the forces in the Senate are, as of March 2011 almost balanced, the results of this election could play a role in the September 2011 senatorial elections.

== Opinion polls ==
The poll below was conducted only in cantons subject to renewal.

Polling firm	Fieldwork date	Sample size	Abs.	EXG	FG	PS/ PRG	DVG	EELV/ ECO	MoDem	UMP/ NC	DVD	FN	DIV
2011 election	20 March 2011	–	55.68%	0.58%	8.92%	26.43%	5.41%	8.59%	1.22%	22.43%	9.32%	15.06%	2.03%
Harris Interactive	12–13 Mar 2011	1,240	–	1%	10%	32%		9%	2%	28%		15%	3%

== Results ==
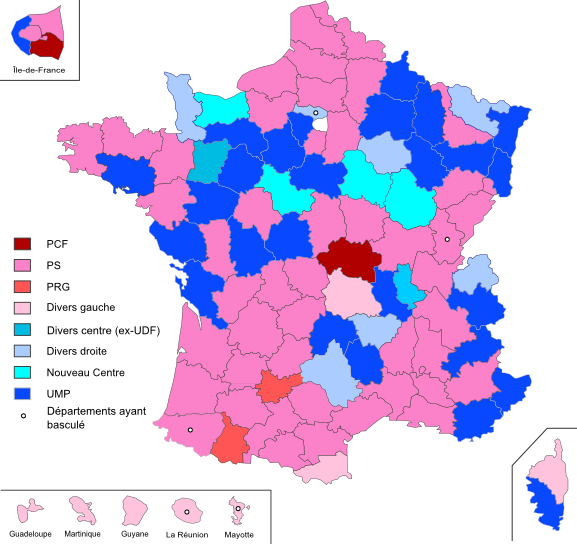
Party affiliation of the General Council Presidents of the various departments in the elections of 2011

Party	First round			Second round			Total seats
Party	Votes	%	Seats	Votes	%	Seats	Total seats
Socialist Party (Parti socialiste)	2,284,967	24.94	150	2,802,094	35.43	670	820
Europe Écologie – Les Verts	752,992	8.22	0	216,144	2.73	27	27
Communist Party (Parti communiste français)	724,911	7.91	19	381,096	4.82	97	116
Miscellaneous Left (Divers gauche)	495,822	5.41	57	437,823	5.54	137	194
Left Radical Party (Parti radical de gauche)	135,958	1.48	17	119,967	1.51	34	51
Left Party (Parti de gauche)	92,386	1.01	1	16,095	0.20	4	5
Total Parliamentary Left	4,487,036	48.97	244	3,972,949	50.23	968	1,212
Union for a Popular Movement (Union pour un mouvement populaire)	1,554,744	16.97	92	1,581,756	20.00	277	369
Miscellaneous Right (Divers droite)	853,892	9.32	77	744,170	9.41	187	264
Presidential Majority-New Centre (Majorité-Nouveau Centre)	293,543	3.20	16	289,328	3.66	42	58
Presidential Majority (Majorité)	206,488	2.25	21	197,085	2.49	41	62
Total "Presidential Majority"	2,908,667	31.74	206	2,812,339	35.56	547	753
National Front (Front national)	1,379,902	15.06	0	915,504	11.57	2	2
Others (Autres)	123,543	1.35	6	95,251	1.20	28	34
Democratic Movement (Mouvement démocrate)	111,887	1.22	2	74,224	0.94	14	16
Other Far-left (Extrême gauche)	53,316	0.58	0	273	0.00	0	0
Regionalists and separatists	48,468	0.53	2	18,280	0.23	3	5
Other ecologists	34,112	0.37	0	16,074	0.20	2	2
Other far-right (Extrême droite)	13,673	0.15	0	4,932	0.06	1	1
Totals	9,160,604	100.00	460	7,909,826	100.00	1,566	2,026
Turnout	9,439,097	44.32		8 513 399	44.77		

Abstention: 55.68%; invalid ballots; 2.95%

== Sources ==
- Results (Ministère de l'Intérieur)
