= Montpellier Business School =

French business school

Coordinates: 43°37′17″N 3°50′01″E

- École Supérieure de Commerce de Montpellier
- Motto: Excellence & commitment
- Type: Grande école de commerce et de management (Private research university Business school)
- Established: 1897; 129 years ago
- Accreditation: Triple accreditation: AACSB; AMBA; EQUIS
- Affiliations: Conférence des grandes écoles; Union of Independent Grandes Écoles
- President: André Deljarry
- Dean: Bruno Ducasse
- Academic staff: +100 teacher-researchers; 96% PhD.; 45% female; 67% international
- Students: 3,600; 60% international students
- Location: Montpellier, France
- Language: English-only & French-only instruction
- Nickname: MBS
- Website: www.montpellier-bs.com

Montpellier Business School (France)

Montpellier Business School is a French business school (grande école) located in Montpellier. Founded in 1897 by the Montpellier Chamber of Commerce and Industry, this Grande école is one of the oldest of the French Écoles Supérieures de Commerce.

Montpellier Business School offers several programmes: Bachelor, Master (programme Grande Ecole), 15 Masters of Science, and Executive MBA. The business school has the triple accreditation EQUIS, AACSB and AMBA.

== Legal non-profit status ==
Since 2013 Montpellier Business School has been constituted as an association under the law of 1901, which guarantees its non-profit status. Cementing this in 2017 Montpellier Business School was designated a Private Higher Education Institution of General Interest (EESPIG). by the French State, this further ensures that all its resources are exclusively assigned to the public service mission of higher education.

== History ==
The ESC Montpellier was created in 1897 by the Chamber of Commerce of Montpellier (CCI Montpellier).

- 1915, MBS became the first business school to admit women into its classes.
- 1993, the school became a member of the Conférence des Grandes écoles
- 1994, heralded the launch of the Executive MBA
- 2000 saw the creation of the Bachelor of Business Administration.
- 2007 the MBS Foundation for Equal Opportunities, under the aegis of the Fondation de France was created, and the school's commitment to equality and diversity was affirmed when in 2009 Montpellier Business School became the first higher education institution to be accredited with the Diversity Label awarded by AFNOR
- 2010, the school obtained the EFMD – EPAS accreditation of the Master's degree.
- 2011, the school received its AACSB accreditation, and at the same time, launches the BADGE® Executive Education programmes, accredited by the CGE.
- 2012, the Executive MBA programme was accredited AMBA.
- 2013, Montpellier Business School opened a new campus in Dakar.

== Rankings ==
In 2024 MSBS was ranked 69th in Europe overall by the Financial Times, with its flagship MiM program being placed at 40th.

In 2025 Le Figaro placed the MiM at 13th and the Bachelor Of International Business Administration 10th in its "Classement des écoles de commerce" 2025 (Ranking of schools of business).

== Grande école degrees ==
MBS is a grande école, a French institution of higher education that is separate from, but parallel and often connected to, the main framework of the French public university system. Grandes écoles are elite academic institutions that admit students through an extremely competitive process, and a significant proportion of their graduates occupy the highest levels of French society. Similar to Ivy League schools in the United States, Oxbridge in the UK, and C9 League in China, graduation from a grande école is considered the prerequisite credential for any top government, administrative and corporate position in France.

The degrees are accredited by the Conférence des Grandes Écoles and awarded by the Ministry of National Education (France). Higher education business degrees in France are organized into three levels thus facilitating international mobility: the Licence / Bachelor's degrees, and the Master's and Doctorat degrees. The Bachelors and the Masters are organized in semesters: 6 for the Bachelors and 4 for the Masters. Those levels of study include various "parcours" or paths based on UE (Unités d'enseignement or Modules), each worth a defined number of European credits (ECTS). A student accumulates those credits, which are generally transferable between paths. A Bachelors is awarded once 180 ECTS have been obtained (bac + 3); a Masters is awarded once 120 additional credits have been obtained (bac +5). The highly coveted PGE (Grand Ecole Program) ends with the degree of Master's in Management (MiM)

== Research ==
The research activities cover all traditional areas of management research. Research activities are based on the work of permanent teacher-researchers. Several Montpellier Business School's teacher-researchers are also part of the LabEx Entreprendre.

The researchers play a role in editorial activities and in the organisation of annual conferences such as the Interdisciplinary European Conference on Entrepreneurship Research (IECER) and the International Finance Conference (IFC). In November 2017, Montpellier Business School has also organised its first International Conference on Energy, Finance and the Macroeconomics Conférence Internationale sur l’Energie, la Finance et la Macroéconomie (ICEFM).

== Programmes ==
Montpellier Business School, member of the Conférence des Grandes écoles, develops courses from Bachelor's degrees, Master's degrees to an Executive MBA and a Digital Doctor of Business Administration

Every year, Montpellier Business School also offers a Spring & Summer School.

== Partnerships ==
MBS has over 180 partner universities worldwide.

== Notable alumni ==
- Éric Besson (MBS 1979) — French politician and businessman

== See also ==
- Education in France
