= The Progressives =

Social-democratic French political party

The Progressives (Les Progressistes) is a social-democratic French political party associated to the centre-right Union for a Popular Movement.

It was founded in September 2007 by Éric Besson, Secretary of State in François Fillon's government and former member of the Socialist Party, Emmanuel Dupuy, President of the Union of Radical Republicans and Marc d'Héré, President of European and Social Initiative, aiming at creating a left wing for the presidential majority within the framework of the 'ouverture'.

Thus, The Progressives along with the Modern Left of Jean-Marie Bockel represent the left wing of the coalition supporting ex-President Nicolas Sarkozy.

In the 2009 European Parliament election, the party obtained a few non-eligible spots on the lists of the Presidential Majority.

Since Besson is a member of the UMP's national leadership, the party is considered associated to the UMP. It is also a member of the Liaison Committee for the Presidential Majority.
