= BEM Management School =

French business school

BEM Bordeaux Management School
- Motto: BEM, a new way of teaching responsible management
- Type: Business school (école consulaire)
- Active: 1874–2012
- Affiliations: CGE, AACSB, AMBA, EQUIS
- Students: 2,700 (in 2010)
- Location: Talence, Aquitaine, France; 44.796173°N 0.601566°W

BEM - Bordeaux Management School was a French grande école founded in 1874, which merged with Euromed to form KEDGE Business School in 2013. It was managed and financed by the Bordeaux Chamber of Commerce. The Master of Science in Management programme was also known as "École Supérieure de Commerce de Bordeaux" or "ESC Bordeaux".

BEM was a member of the Chapitre de la Conference des Grandes Écoles, which is the association of France's leading schools.

BEM was based in Talence near Bordeaux. BEM is a member of the "campus d'excellence (IDEX)", "Université de Bordeaux", an élite research federation. In 2008, BEM opened new campuses in Dakar and Paris.

BEM Talents is the name of the alumni society.

== History ==
- 1873 : Foundation of École supérieure de commerce de Bordeaux
- 2000 : Equis accreditation
- 2001 : Wine MBA
- 2004 : The school was chosen by ONU and EFMD for the "Globally Responsible Leadership Initiative" launch
- 2007 : AMBA accreditation (Wine MBA)
- 2007 : Bordeaux École de Management becomes BEM - Bordeaux Management School
- 2008 : BEM Dakar Campus in Sénégal
- 2008 : BEM Paris Campus
- 2009 : AACSB Accreditation
- 2013 : Merger with EUROMED Management School, Marseille to form KEDGE Business School

== Accreditations ==
BEM was a member of the Chapitre de la Conférence des Grandes Ecoles a and the United Nations Global Compact. It was scheduled by the European Quality Improvement System (EQUIS; now the EFMD Quality Improvement System, the Association of MBAs (AMBA) and the Association to Advance Collegiate Schools of Business (AACSB). At the start of 2012, only 12 schools had this triple accreditation in France, and 57 in the world.

== Partnerships and joint degrees ==
=== Business partnerships ===
BEM had partnerships with JP Morgan, Société Générale, Auchan, Pricewaterhousecoopers, Procter & Gamble, Ernst & Young, L'Oréal and BNP Paribas.

=== Academic Partnerships ===
BEM was a member of the PRES Université de Bordeaux which included Sciences Po Bordeaux, the National Magistrates School (ENM), Institut Polytechnique de Bordeaux and most Bordeaux universities.

The Université de Bordeaux was selected by the French government to become an IDEX campus, a campus lauréat des initiatives d'excellence, intended to be the top-funded campuses in France with the aim of competing with the best American universities.

BEM students could complete a joint degree with either an international partner university (see list before) or with Bordeaux's bar school. They also had the possibility of being awarded the "DSCG", the main French accountancy diploma.

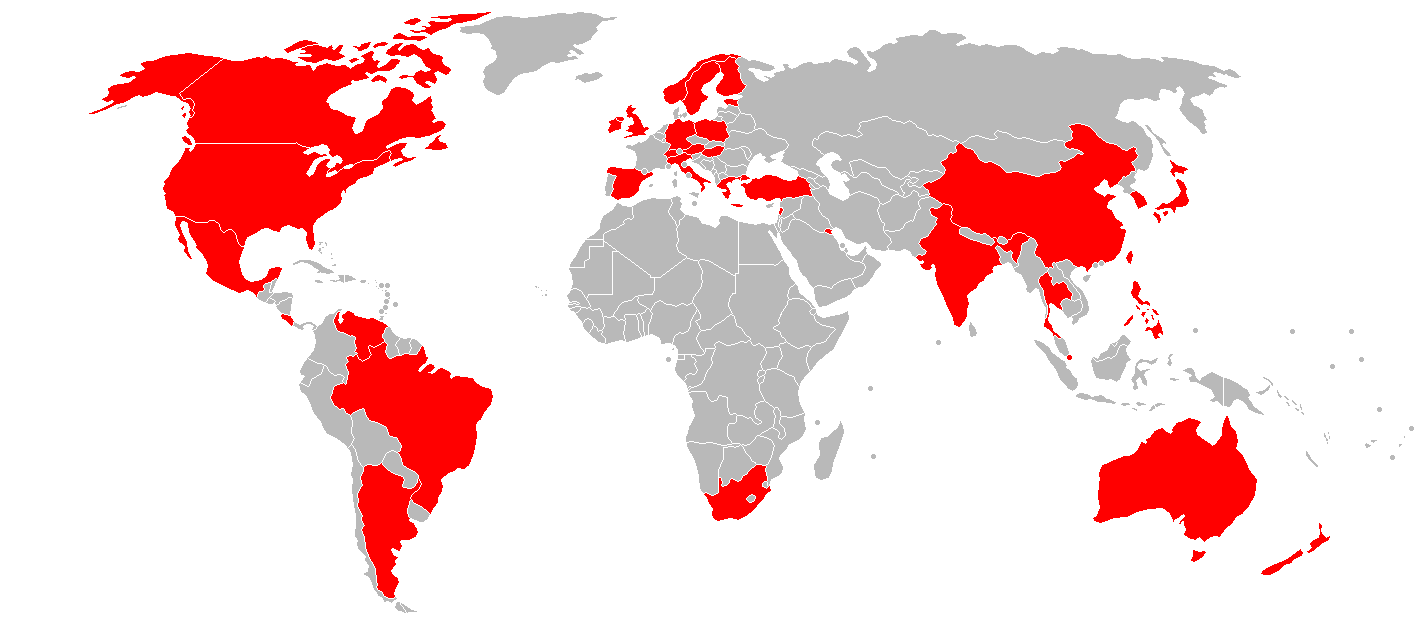
Universités partenaires de BEM dans le monde (2008)

International partner institutions as of 2011–12 were:

Country	Institution in partnership with BEM Bordeaux	Accreditation
Argentina	Universidad Belgrano - Buenos Aires	
Australia	University of South Australia - Adelaide	EQUIS
Australia	Royal Melbourne Institute of Technology - Melbourne	
Australia	University of La Trobe - Melbourne	EPAS
Australia	University of Technology - Sydney	AACSB
Austria	Karl-Franzens Universität - Graz	
Austria	Wirtschafts Universität - Vienna	EQUIS
Belgium	Solvay Brussels School of Economics and Management	EQUIS - AMBA
Brazil	Universidad São Paulo	
Canada	HEC - Montréal	EQUIS - AACSB - AMBA
Canada	Queens School of Business - Kingston	EQUIS - AACSB - AMBA
Canada	University of Laval - Québec	AACSB - EQUIS
Canada	University of Manitoba - Winnipeg	AACSB
Canada	University of Ottawa	EQUIS - AACSB - AMBA
Canada	Sauder Business School / U B C - Vancouver	EQUIS - AACSB
Chile	Universidad de Chile - Santiago	AMBA
Hong Kong	Hong Kong Baptist University	AACSB
Hong Kong	Hong Kong University of Science & Technology	EQUIS - AACSB
China	Huazhong University of Science & Technology - Wuhan	
Hong Kong	HKU Space	
China	Macau University	
China	Shanghai University of Finance & Economics	
China	Tongji University - Shanghai	AMBA
China	University Of International Business and Economics - Pekin	
China	Wuhan University of Technology	
Colombia	Universidad Los Andes - Bogota	EQUIS - AMBA - AACSB
Costa Rica	INCAE Business School - Alajuela	EQUIS - AACSB
Denmark	University of Aalborg - Aalborg	
Denmark	Copenhagen Business School	EQUIS - AACSB - AMBA
Estonia	Estonian Business School - Tallinn	
Finland	Aalto University School of Economic - Helsinki	EQUIS - AMBA - AACSB
Finland	Tampere University of Applied Sciences	
Finland	Hanken School of Economics - Helsinki	EQUIS - AMBA
Germany	WHU – Otto Beisheim School of Management - Coblence/Vallendar	EQUIS - AACSB
Germany	European Business School - Francfort	EQUIS
Germany	PFH - Göttingen	
Germany	University of Hamburg	
Germany	University of Mannheim	EQUIS - AMBA - AACSB
Germany	Technical University of Munich	
Germany	University of Passau	
Great Britain	Cardiff University Business School	
Great Britain	Oxford Brookes University	AMBA - EPAS
Great Britain	University of Aston, Aston Business School	EQUIS - AACSB - AMBA
Great Britain	University of Essex	
Great Britain	University of Hull	EQUIS - AACSB - AMBA
Great Britain	University of Hertfordshire, Hatfield	EPAS
Great Britain	University of Liverpool	AMBA
Great Britain	University of Nottingham	EQUIS - AMBA
Great Britain	University of Newcastle	EQUIS - AMBA - EPAS
Great Britain	University of Sheffield	EQUIS - AMBA
Great Britain	University of Staffordshire - Stafford	
Great Britain	University of Strathclyde - Glasgow	EQUIS - AMBA - AACSB
Great Britain	University of Wales Newport	
Great Britain	University of Winchester	
Greece	Athens Laboratory of Business Administration - Athènes	AMBA - EPAS
Greece	Athens University of Economics & Business - Athènes	AMBA
Hungary	Corvinus University of Budapest	EPAS
India	Birla Institute of Management Technology - New Delhi	
India	Indian Institute of Management - Bangalore	EQUIS
India	Indian Institute of Management - Calcutta	
India	Indian Institute of Management - Indore	AMBA
India	Indian Institute of Management - Kozhikode	AMBA
India	Loyola Institute of Business Administration - Madras	
India	SP Jain Management and Research Institute- Bombay	AMBA
India	XLRI, School of Business and Human Resources - Jamshedpur	
Indonesia	PPM Institute of Management - Jakarta	
Ireland	University College Dublin	EQUIS - AACSB - AMBA
Ireland	Dublin City University	AMBA - EPAS
Italy	Libero Institute Universita Cattanéo - Castellanza	
Italy	University of Trieste - Trieste	
Italy	Seconda Universita degli studi di Napoli, Naples	
Japan	Seinan Gakuin University - Fukuoka	
Kuwait	Koweit University, College of Business Administration	AACSB
Lebanon	Notre Dame University - Beyrouth	
Malaysia	Asian Institute of Medecine, Science and Technology, Bedong	
Morocco	École Nationale de Commerce et de Gestion (ENCG), Settat	
Mexico	Instituto Technologico Autonomo de Mexico ITAM, Mexico	EQUIS - AACSB
Mexico	Tecnologico de Monterrey - Cuernavaca campus	
Mexico	Tecnologico de Monterrey - Estado de Mexico	
Mexico	Tecnologico de Monterrey - Guadalaraja campus	
Mexico	Tecnologico de Monterrey - Monterrey campus	EQUIS - AACSB - AMBA
Mexico	Tecnologico de Monterrey - Ciudad de Mexico campus	
New Zealand	Auckland University of Technology - Auckland	AACSB
Norway	BI Norwegian School of Management - Oslo	EQUIS
Netherlands	Grônigen University	AACSB
Peru	Universidad del Pacifico - Lima	AACSB - AMBA
Philippines	Ateneo de Manila University - Manille	
Poland	Warsaw School of Economics	EPAS
Portugal	ISCTE Business School - Lisbonne	AMBA
Singapore	Singapore Management University	EQUIS - AACSB
Slovenia	University of Lubjana	EQUIS - AACSB
South Africa	University of Stellenbosch School - Cape Town	EQUIS - AMBA
South Korea	SungKyunKwan University - Séoul	AACSB
South Korea	Yonsei University - Seoul	AACSB
Spain	Universidad Carlos III - Madrid	
Spain	Universidad Pontifica Comillas - Madrid	
Spain	Universidad Rey Juan Carlos - Madrid	
Spain	Universidad Navarra - Pampelune	
Spain	Universidad Salamanca	
Spain	Universidad Deusto	
Spain	Universidad Valladolid	
Spain	Fundesem Business School, Alicante	
Sweden	Jönköping International Business School (JIBS)	EPAS
Sweden	Stockholm School of Economics	EQUIS
Sweden	University of Gothenburg	EQUIS
Sweden	University of Gotland	
Sweden	University of Lund	EQUIS
Sweden	University of Uppsala	
Switzerland	University of St Gall	EQUIS - AACSB
Switzerland	Zurich University of Applied Sciences, Winterthur	
Thailand	College of Management Mahidol University - Bangkok	
Taiwan	National Chengchi University, Taipei	EQUIS - AACSB
Taiwan	Fujen Catholic University, College of Law & Management - Taipei	AACSB
Turkey	Koç University - Istanbul	EQUIS
Uruguay	Universidad de Montevideo	
USA	Sonoma State University	AACSB
USA	University of Alabama - Tuscaloosa, AL	AACSB
USA	University of Clarkson - Potsdam, New-York	AACSB
USA	University of Louisville, KY	AACSB
USA	University of Minnesota, Carlson School of Management - Minneapolis, MN	AACSB
USA	University of Tennessee, College of Business Administration - Knoxville, TN	AACSB
USA	University of San Diego - CA	AACSB
USA	University of Willamette, Atkinson Graduate School of Management - Salem, OR	AACSB
USA	University of Wisconsin-Green Bay, WI	AACSB
USA	Wake Forest University, Babcock Graduate School of Management - Winston-Salem, NC	AACSB
USA	Wake Forest University, Wayne Calloway School of Business and Accounting - Winston-Salem, NC	AACSB
USA	Western Washington University - Bellingham, WA	AACSB
USA	Xavier University - Cincinnati, Ohio	AACSB
Venezuela	IESA - Caracas	AACSB - AMBA - EQUIS

=== * International Relations ===
BEM Grande Ecole Students have to complete a 6-month international experience through an internship or study abroad. They can study for a semester/year or a double-degree (MA, MSc or MBA) at a partner university, for instance at HEC Montréal, EBS Business School, Mannheim Business School, Stockholm School of Economics, Nottingham Business School, Laval, Hong Kong University and the highly prestigious Swiss university of Saint-Gallen. Most of them are accredited (EQUIS, AACSB et AMBA) and are highly ranked institutions.

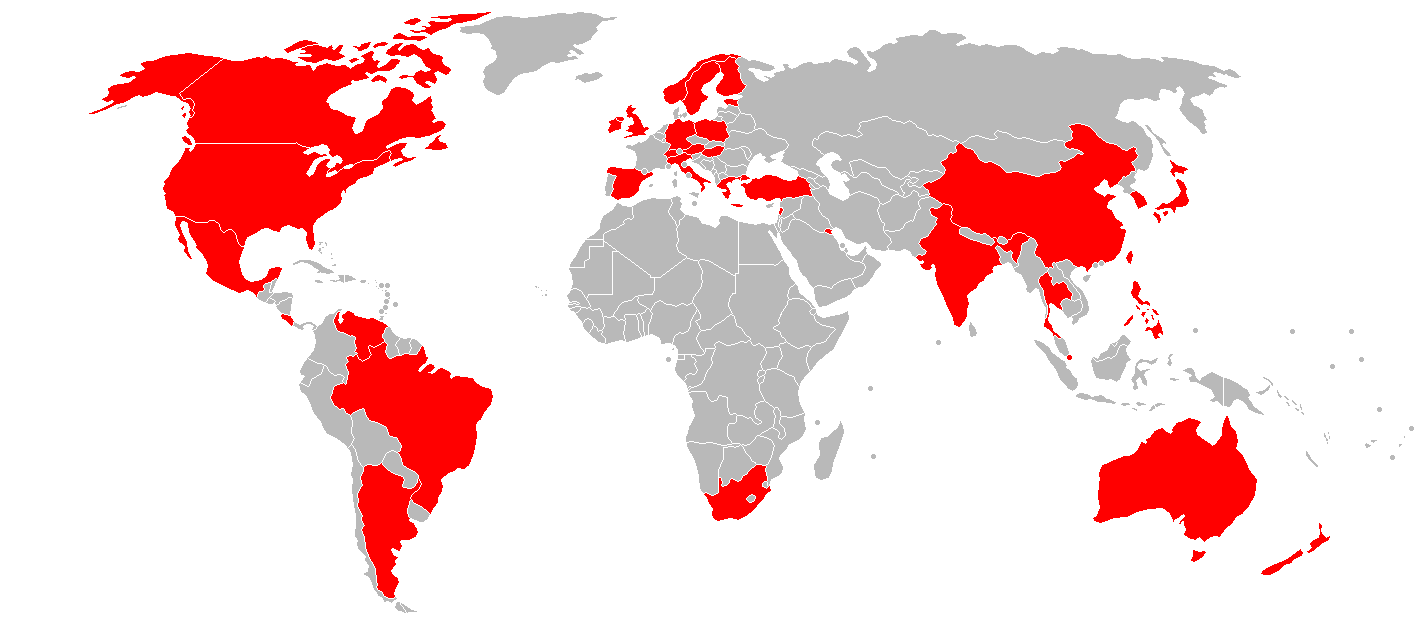
Universités partenaires de BEM dans le monde (2008)

== Research ==
Former French prime minister Alain Juppé, who is the current mayor of Bordeaux, has signed Bordeaux's Call for Responsible Management.

== Student life ==
More than 30 clubs (sports, culture,...). "AOC" is France's biggest student-run oenological club. It organises visits to the greatest vineyards (Château Rothschild, Château d'Yquem,... ), wine-tasting sessions and the "Wine Rally".

== Development of KEDGE Business School ==
In the year 2013, BEM merged with EUROMED Management School to form KEDGE Business School. The merged institution has its central administration on the former BEM campus in Bordeaux.

== Notable alumni ==
Bordeaux Management School had an active network of 20,000 alumni. Measured by the number of notable alumni, it was the eighth most powerful network in France among French business schools.
