= Éric Besson =

French politician and businessman

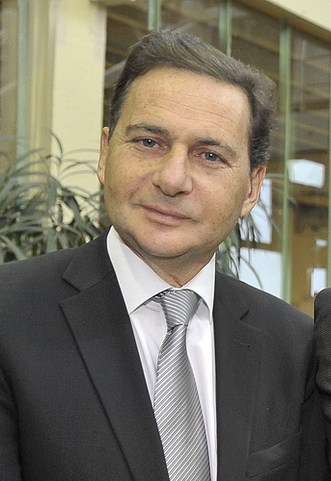
- Éric Besson, in 2010.

Minister for Industry, Energy and Digital Economy
- In office 14 November 2010 – 10 May 2012
- President: Nicolas Sarkozy
- Prime Minister: François Fillon
- Preceded by: Christian Estrosi
- Succeeded by: Arnaud Montebourg

Minister of Immigration, Integration, National Identity and Mutually-Supportive Development
- In office January 2009 – 13 November 2010
- President: Nicolas Sarkozy
- Prime Minister: François Fillon
- Preceded by: Brice Hortefeux
- Succeeded by: Vacant

State Secretary for Prospectives and Evaluation of Public Policies
- In office May 2007 – January 2009
- President: Nicolas Sarkozy
- Prime Minister: François Fillon

Personal details
- Born: 2 April 1958 (age 68) Marrakesh, Morocco
- Party: The Progressives / UMP (since 2007)
- Other political affiliations: Socialist Party (1993–2007)
- Spouse(s): Sylvie Brunel (m. 1983–2009, divorced); Yasmine Torjdman (m. 2010–2015, divorced); Jamila Azeroual (m. 2015–present)
- Children: 3 (with Sylvie Brunel)
- Education: Montpellier Business School, Sciences Po

Éric Besson (born 2 April 1958) is a French politician and businessman. From 2009 to 2010, he was the Minister of Immigration, Integration, National Identity and Co-Development in the government of François Fillon.

He left the Socialist Party (PS) during the first round of the 2007 presidential elections to found The Progressives, a social democratic affiliate party of Nicolas Sarkozy's Union for a Popular Movement (UMP). He has been Deputy Secretary-General of the UMP since 2009.

In 2012, Besson established a strategy consulting firm, Eric Besson Consulting, advising international industry and energy firms.

== Biography ==
Eric Besson was born in Marrakesh, Morocco, on 2 April 1958. His mother is of Lebanese origin. His father, an officer in the French Air Force, was killed in a flight accident three months before Éric Besson's birth.

After graduating high school in Casablanca, he moved to France to attend the Montpellier Business School. He then studied at the Institut d'études politiques de Paris (Sciences Po), before unsuccessfully applying to the École nationale d'administration (ENA).

Besson subsequently joined the French car company Renault, then was editor-in-chief of business magazine Challenges, before joining the Vivendi foundation.

== Political career ==
=== Beginnings (1993–2007) ===
Besson was a member of the Socialist Party from 1993 to 2007. He has been mayor of Donzère since 1995 and was the député for the Drôme between 1997 and 2007, when he did not stand for re-election. During his time as a Member of Parliament, Besson was a member of the National Commission for Defense and the Armed Forces from 1997 to 1998, the Financial and Economic Planning Commission from 1998 to 2002, the Commission of Inquiry on the Activity and Functioning of Commercial Courts, and the Commission of Inquiry on Superphénix and fast neutron reactors (both in 1998).

Following his re-election in 2002, he became a full member of the Supervisory Board of the Social Debt Amortizement Fund and the Supervisory Board of the Agency for Industrial Innovation.

Besson was appointed the PS National Secretary for the Economy, Employment and Business in 2003, and National Secretary for the Economy and Taxation in 2005.

=== State Secretary for Prospectives and Evaluation of Public Policies (2007–2009) ===
Besson began the 2007 French presidential election as a member of Ségolène Royal's campaign team. However, he resigned as the PS finance secretary on 14 February 2007 over frustration about Royal's presidential campaign, which he saw as "badly organised". He then quit the Socialist Party on 21 February and supported Nicolas Sarkozy's presidential bid for which he was harshly criticized.

In May 2007, he was appointed as State Secretary for Prospectives and Evaluation of Public Policies under the government of Francois Fillon.

That year, he also launched a new political party, The Progressives, affiliated with the Union for a Popular Movement, Nicolas Sarkozy's party, through the Liaison Committee for the Presidential Majority.

In March 2008, he was re-elected as mayor of Donzère after the first round with 69.92% of the votes.

On 18 March 2008, following a ministerial reshuffle, the position of Secretary of State for the Digital Economy was created and subsequently given to Besson. The creation of the post was a response to the Attali report that stressed the importance of digital development for France's economic future. In this capacity, Besson conducted a strategic analysis of 10 challenges facing France until 2025.

In October 2008, the "2012 Digital France" plan was released. The plan sought to reduce "the gap between France and its international competitors" in this sector. The strategy to achieve this was based around three major objectives: ensuring far-reaching access to broadband Internet, ensuring production and supply of digital content, and reducing the digital divide. The purpose was to increase economic growth and modernize the country.

=== Minister for Immigration, Integration, National Identity and Co-Development (2009–2010) ===
In January 2009, he was appointed Minister for Immigration, Integration, National Identity and Co-Development in the second government of Prime Minister François Fillon.

His tenure was characterized by a stronger fight against illegal immigration and human trafficking. While a guest on a French TV show, Besson described the immigration policy as based on "firmness and humanity". An immigration bill was presented in 2010 that prolonged the detention period of illegal immigrants, penalized employment of illegal immigrants, and called on immigrants wishing to acquire French citizenship to adhere "to the essential principles and values of the republic". Furthermore, Sarkozy gave the immigration ministry a target of 30,000 repatriations per year.

At the same time, the state budget for the reception and integration of those entering France legally was increased by more than 20% in order to discourage illegal immigration and, in turn, promote lawful ways of entering and settling in France. Entry formalities for foreigners were simplified, a long-term visa system was established, and 1,000 additional places in reception centers were opened to raise their capacity to absorb asylum seekers.

As part of an EU-wide resettlement system to distribute refugees in highly exposed countries such as Greece, Malta and Italy more evenly across the EU, Besson agreed to the resettlement of refugees from Malta to France, making France the first country to act on the scheme. Besson subsequently supported the creation of a common European asylum system and advocated for Malta to host the newly established European Asylum Support Office.

In September 2009, an area known as "the Jungle" near Calais, where many illegal immigrants had settled in order to cross the British channel to the UK, was cleared. According to Besson, the operation was targeting the "logistical infrastructure and mafia-style networks of people traffickers who sell the trip to England at a very high price".

Later in 2009, President Sarkozy initiated a public debate on French national identity. Besson was in charge of organizing the debate and argued that discussions about identity had been left to right-wing extremists such as Jean-Marie Le Pen for too long. The debate was concluded when Fillon announced the creation of an "experts committee" of politicians and historians in February 2010. The debate damaged Besson's political standing, with one weekly magazine calling him "the most hated man" in the Republic.

=== Minister for Industry, Energy and the Digital Economy (2010–2012) ===
Éric Besson was appointed Minister for Industry, Energy and the Digital Economy on 14 November 2010.

In December that year, Besson sent a letter to the French state agency governing internet use in order to stop French web hosting company OVH from hosting the WikiLeaks website. The French government had previously deemed WikiLeaks a "criminal" website for violating the "confidentiality of diplomatic relations" and endangering people "protected by diplomatic secrecy", making it illegal for French companies to host WikiLeaks.

Besson also reiterated his support for the Union for the Mediterranean on a visit to the organization's secretariat in May 2011.

During his tenure, he oversaw the extension of France's push for greater digitalization. In his capacity as Minister, he organized a "digital G8 seminar" for young professionals in May 2011, followed by the G20 Young Entrepreneurs Alliance Summit in November.

Also in November, the "Digital France 2012–2020: assessment and prospects" report was published, a follow-up to the "2012 Digital France" plan. The report set new targets for 2020 for the expansion of digitalization and the enhancement of the digital economy.

In April 2011, the Union for a Popular Movement selected him as its candidate in the newly created Fifth constituency for French residents overseas (covering French citizens resident in Andorra, Monaco, Portugal and Spain) for the June 2012 legislative elections.

Besson expressed continued support for the use of nuclear energy and the export of French nuclear technology. On a visit to Japan's Fukushima Daiichi plant in 2012, the first by an overseas minister, Besson is reported to have said that nuclear energy was too important as an energy source to be abandoned. A study he commissioned on the future of France's energy mix by 2025 nevertheless listed various scenarios for ending reliance on nuclear energy among possible options.

=== Retreat from national politics ===
Besson announced his retirement from national politics on 12 May 2012 and returned to the private sector. He retained his position of mayor of Donzère. Although he initially did not seek re-election as mayor, he once again ran for the position during the municipal elections in 2014 after the candidate he supported withdrew his candidacy for health reasons. Besson was re-elected in the first round with 61.49% of the votes.

=== Post-political career ===
Eric Besson Consulting was founded in 2012, advising energy and industrial production companies.

He is also a shareholder and member of the supervisory board of PayTop, a fintech start-up.

In 2016, he was elected to the board of Geocorail, an off-shore engineering company.

In July 2017, he became the president of the Blanc-Mesnil football club playing in the 5th French division. According to media reports, he plans to bring the club up to the professional level in 5 to 10 years and plans opening a sports academy by September 2018.

== Personal life ==
Besson was married from 1983–2009 to Sylvie Brunel, a geographer and writer and former president of Action Against Hunger, with whom he has three children. Their eldest child, Alexandra (born 1989), is a novelist.

Besson married Yasmine Tordjman in September 2010, an art student from Tunisia. She is the granddaughter of former Tunisian president Habib Bourguiba. In December 2012, the couple announced their intention to separate and divorced in 2015.

He married Jamila Azeroual in August 2015.

== Offices ==
- Governmental functions
  - Minister for Industry, Energy and Digital Economy: 2010–2012.
  - Minister of Immigration, Integration, National Identity and Mutually-Supportive Development: 2009–2010.
  - Secretary of State in charge of exploration, appraisal of public policies and development of the digital economy: 2007–2009.
- Electoral mandates
- National Assembly of France
  - Member of the National Assembly of France for Drôme (2nd constituency): 1997–2007 (Became minister in 2007). Elected in 1997, reelected in 2002.
- Municipal Council
  - Mayor of Donzère: Since 1995. Reelected in 2001, 2008, 2014.
  - Municipal councillor of Donzère: Since 1995. Reelected in 2001, 2008, 2014.

== List of publications ==
=== Books ===
- Pour la nation (2010)
- La République numérique (2008)
- Qui connaît Madame Royal? (2007)

=== Co-authored works ===
- Les inquiétantes ruptures de Monsieur Sarkozy (Parti Socialiste, 2007)
- Arnaud de Rosnay le magnifique (with Marie-Christine Zanni, 1987)

=== Prefaces ===
- L'homme et le marché: créer et répartir autrement, in Vincent Champain, Gilles Cazes, Xavier Greffe [et al.] (2006)

=== Reports ===
- Plan France numérique 2012–2020, Ed. Premier ministre (2011)
- France 2025 - Diagnostic stratégique : dix défis pour la France - Janvier 2009, Ed. Premier ministre (2009)
- Évaluation des grands projets publics : diagnostic et propositions, Ed. Premier ministre (2008)
- Accroître la compétitivité des clubs de football professionnel français, Ed. Premier ministre (2008)
- L'employabilité des jeunes issus de l'enseignement professionnel initial du second degré, Ed. Ministère de l'éducation nationale (2008)
- Flexicurité en Europe - Éléments d'analyse, Ed. Premier ministre (2008)
- Formation des prix alimentaires, Ed. Premier ministre (2008)
- Droit au logement opposable : 7 pistes pour accroître l'offre de logements sociaux, Ed. Premier ministre (2008)
- Valoriser l'acquis de l'expérience : une évaluation du dispositif de VAE, Ed. Premier ministre (2008)
- Plan France numérique 2012, Ed. Premier ministre (2008)
- Évaluation et proposition sur la mise en œuvre pratique de la "journée de solidarité" dans les entreprises et les administrations publiques, Ed. Premier ministre (2007)
- TVA sociale, Ed. Premier ministre (2007)
- Nouvelles régulations économiques, Assemblée Nationale (2000)
- Rapport d'information déposé par la Commission des finances, de l'économie générale et du plan sur un plan d'urgence d'aide à la création de "très petites entreprises", Assemblée nationale (1999)
