= Reims Management School =

Business school in Reims, France (1928–2013)

Coordinates: 49.2389°N 4.0030°E

- Type: Grande École
- Active: 1928–2013
- Students: 4,200
- Location: Reims, France
- Website: www.rms.fr

Reims Management School (RMS) was a business school or grande école in Reims, France, offering several specialized programs. It merged with Rouen Business School in 2013 to create NEOMA Business School. Founded in 1928, RMS was one of the few business schools worldwide (1%) to gain triple accreditation by the European EFMD (EQUIS label), the British AMBA, and the American AACSB. More than 50 nationalities were represented among its 4,200 students.

The school merged with Rouen Business School in 2013 to form NEOMA Business School.

In 2012, the Financial Times ranked the MBA programme as 22nd in Europe, and the Sup de Co programme as 19th in Europe. CESEM (Centre d'Etudes Supérieures Européennes de Management) delivers a double diploma, which includes a two-year stay abroad (see IPBS) and relevant work experience consisting of two six-month internships. Sup de Co, the main school, was ranked 8th in France by most rankings in the country.

The 18,000 alumni form one of the strongest business networks in France; 3,500 of whom are based outside France.

Reims Management School was partner of around 100 international universities worldwide.
