= Ministry of Immigration, Integration, National Identity and Codevelopment =

Former government ministry of France

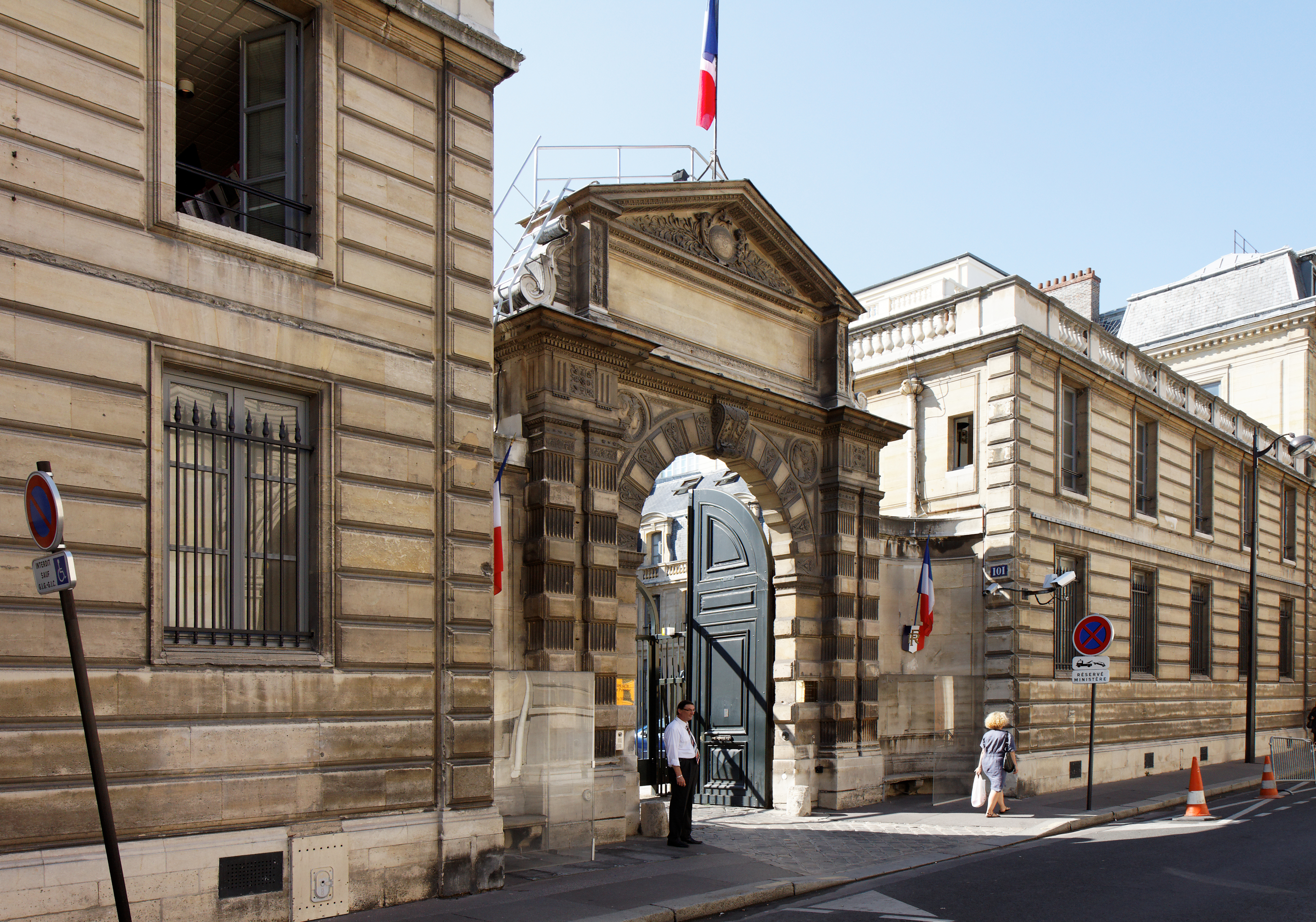
The Ministry of Immigration, Integration, National Identity and Codevelopment was housed at the Hôtel Rothelin-Charolais, 101 Rue de Grenelle in Paris

The Ministry of Immigration, Integration, National Identity and Codevelopment (French: Ministère de l'Immigration, de l'Intégration, de l'Identité nationale et du Codéveloppement) was a ministry of the Government of France that was created by President Nicolas Sarkozy in 2007. It was abolished in 2010.

== History ==
Sarkozy had suggested the formation of such a ministry during his 2007 bid for the presidency. When he presented his intention to create this ministry if elected, a spirited debate over its necessity and impact ensued.

He was inaugurated on 16 May 2007 as President of France; he soon afterward announced the composition of his government. He established the Ministry of Immigration, Integration, National Identity and Codevelopment and appointed Brice Hortefeux to head the newly announced institution. Hortefeux was later replaced by Eric Besson, on 15 January 2009. Besson remained in office until 13 November 2010, when the ministry was abolished. Its functions were redistributed amongst other government agencies.

== Role ==
- To rein in migration flows;
- To foster codevelopment;
- To improve the social integration of migrants;
- To promote the national identity.
