= Rouen Business School =

Business school

Coordinates: 49°27′48″N 1°03′52″E

- Ecole Supérieure de Commerce de Rouen
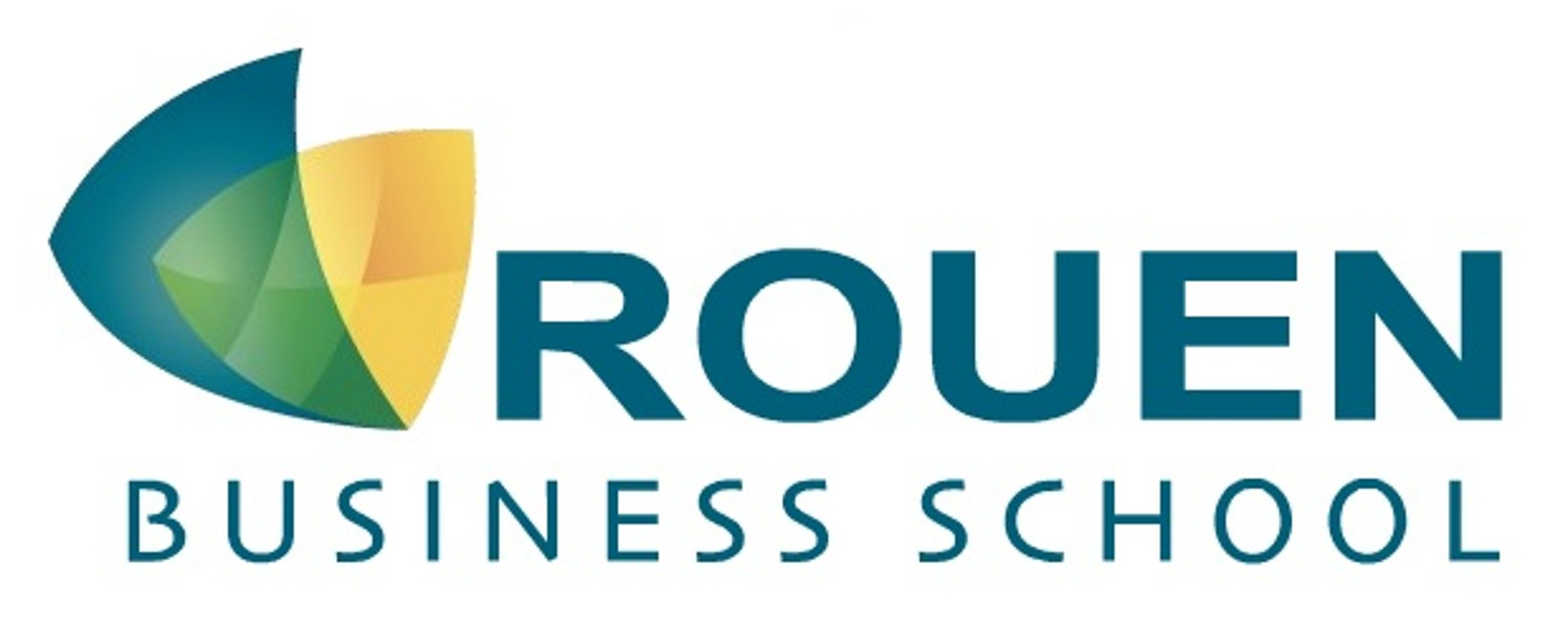
- Type: Grande école
- Active: 1871–2013
- Affiliations: Conférence des Grandes Ecoles; AACSB; AMBA; Equis
- Dean: Alain Dulondel
- Academic staff: 83
- Students: 3,650
- Location: Mont-Saint-Aignan near Rouen, Normandy, France
- Website: www.rouenbs.fr

The Rouen Business School (French: Ecole Supérieure de Commerce de Rouen) was a leading French business school. It was founded in 1871. On 24 April 2013, Rouen Business School and Reims Management School announced the merger of the two schools into a single entity - NEOMA Business School.

Rouen Business School's quality is recognised by its "triple-crown" accreditations (AACSB, AMBA, EQUIS) and its Financial Times' ranking 13th position best European Master in Management. The Financial Times also highlights the particular quality of the education it provides in finance, ranking the "Grande Ecole" program 8th best in Europe and 4th best in France.

== History ==
Established in 1871 in the then-vibrant industrial city of Rouen, it is the second business school to be created in France.

Groupe ESC Rouen was formed in 1996, gathering together four independent schools, all managed and financed mainly by the Rouen Chamber of Commerce and Industry. These schools are ESC Rouen, the leading school of the group, IFI, ISPP and ECAL - each school having a distinctive mission and student base.

ESC Rouen is a founding member of the Chapitre des Ecoles du Management de la Conférence des Grandes Ecoles (Chapter of Management Schools belonging to the Conférence des Grandes Ecoles). The school is also a member of EFMD (European Foundation for Management Development) and AACSB (International Association for Management Education).

ESC Rouen received EQUIS accreditation from the European Foundation for Management Development for a second time in May 2005. Later, the school has received AACSB (Association to Advance Collegiate Schools of Business) and AMBA (Association of Masters of Business Administration) accreditations.

== Notable faculty ==
- Louis Le Duff, billionaire businessman
