= Institut Supérieur de Logistique Industrielle =

Coordinates: 44.7962°N 0.6016°W

Institut Supérieur de Logistique Industrielle (ISLI)
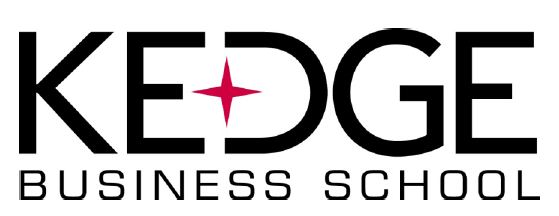
- Type: Grande école
- Established: 1984
- President: Dominique Estampe
- Students: 120 each year
- Location: Bordeaux, France; Paris, France
- Campus: Urban
- Website: www.kedgebs.com/en/programmes/msc-global-supply-chain-management-isli

The Institut Supérieur de Logistique Industrielle (ISLI), or Institute for Supply Chain Excellence as it is called in English, is the Supply Chain Management academic department and research center of KEDGE Business School and located in Talence, France, in the suburb area of Bordeaux. All of its programs are accredited by the Chartered Institute of Procurement & Supply.

== History ==
ISLI was founded in 1984. It was created in response to a demand by professional members of ASLOG (French Logistics Association) and ELA (European Logistics Association).

== Programs ==
Depending on the education level of the applicant, ISLI offers three different programs taught either in French or English.

- MSc in Global Supply Chain Management - intended for foreign students or French students with at least a Bachelor's degree who wish to take a program taught fully in English
- Mastère Spécialisé en Global Supply Chain Management - taught fully in French and intended for French students having completed a Master's degree
- Titre Professionnel Niveau I "Manager de la Chaîne Logistique - Supply Chain Manager" - taught fully in French and intended for French students who have completed their first year of Master's or have at least completed a Bachelor's degree

== Partners ==
ISLI has relationships with numerous multinational corporations as well as all major international professional associations. The Institute's partners are regularly involved in shaping the program's educational orientation and students benefit from these close links through company and factory visits, seminars, conferences and internships.

The research center maintains a network of academic partners worldwide through its international network dedicated to the exchange of best practices in Supply Chain Management.

== Alumni ==
Since its inception, more than 2,200 students have graduated from ISLI. Each year, ISLI alumni and a network of almost 4,000 Supply Chain Managers relay students' skills and resumes to their companies throughout the world.

ISLI's 2013 graduate survey shows that 70% of Mastère Spécialisé graduates work in a multinational company while 31% work overseas. 85% are hired during their apprenticeship (available only to Mastère Spécialisé and Titre Professionnel Niveau I students during their final year). The survey also shows that 80% of MSc graduates join large companies while 100% work in an international position. Regardless of the program, 94% of graduates are hired before actually graduating from the Institute.

== Annual Supply Chain Forum ==
Each year 300 professional speakers and participants from major corporations, who are at the forefront of their particular specialty and have been identified across the globe for their innovative approach to the Supply Chain and the ideas they have introduced into their firms, get together in Bordeaux during ISLI's Supply Chain Forum to discuss and exchange on the future of Supply Chain and share among themselves their experiences and vision.

== Publications ==
The Supply Chain Forum: An International Journal, is a peer-reviewed periodical providing a broad international coverage of subjects relating to the management of the Supply Chain. This academic publication presents research papers, case studies and other articles submitted by researchers and professionals, with the website associated with the publication serving as a center for discussion among supply chain specialists.

The journal is issued quarterly, and is available online or in print. The editorial and review board includes academics from institutions and corporations throughout the world.
