= École supérieure des sciences commerciales d'Angers =

French business school

Coordinates: 47°28′38″N 0°36′2″W

ESSCA School of Management
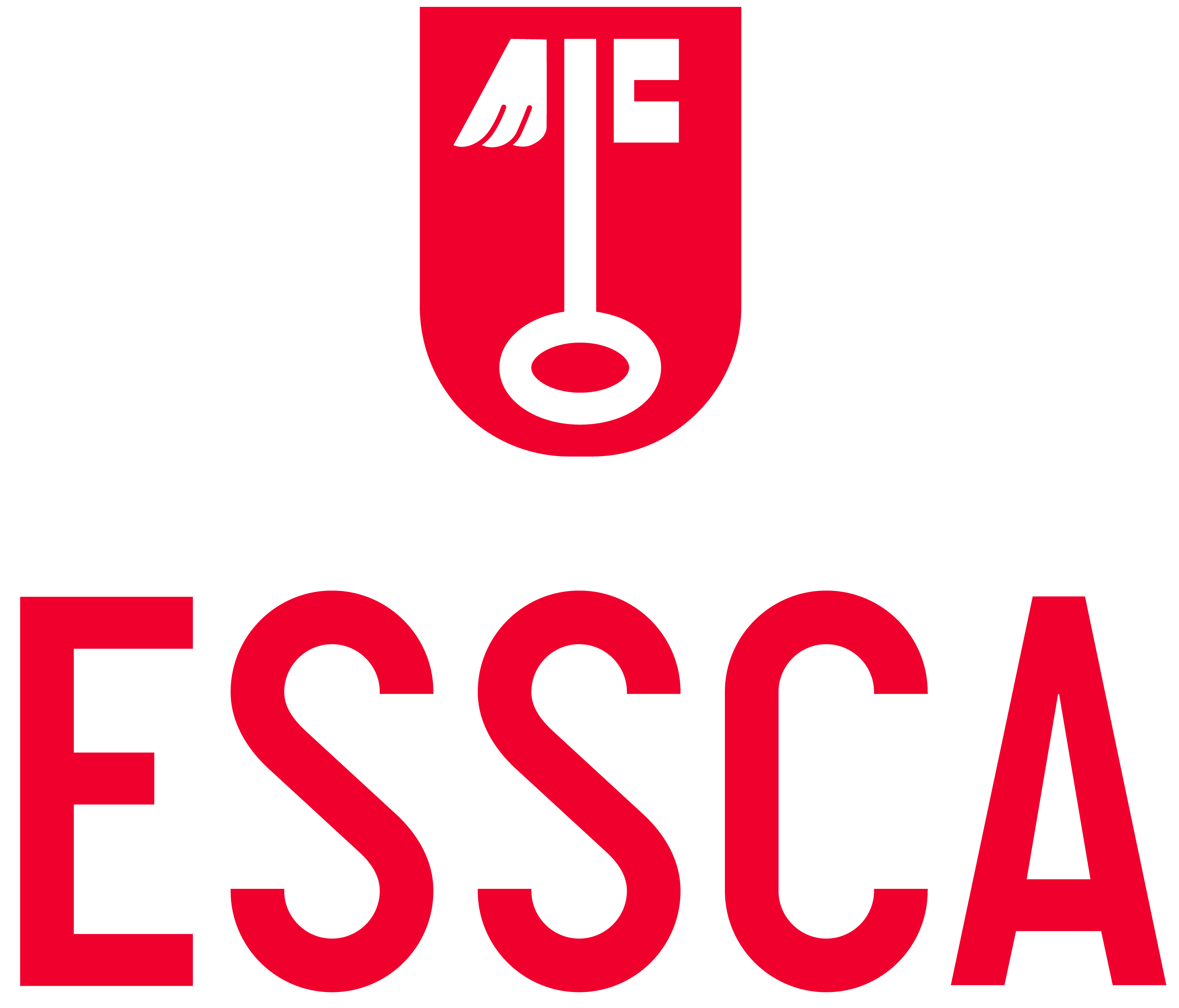
- Other names: ESSCA
- Motto: Créateurs d'avenirs
- Type: Grandes écoles
- Established: 1909
- Affiliations: Triple accreditation (AACSB, AMBA, and EQUIS), CGE, FESIC, UNAM (Université Nantes Angers Le Mans)
- Dean: Jean Charroin
- Academic staff: 132 full-time faculty and 370 adjunct and part-time faculty or international experts
- Students: 4000 full and part-time students
- Location: Angers, Boulogne-Billancourt, Aix en Provence, Bordeaux, Lyon, Strasbourg, Budapest, Málaga, Luxembourg, Shanghai
- Website: www.essca.eu/en/

ESSCA School of Management is a French grande école and business school. Historically based in Angers, it now has campuses in Paris, Aix-en-Provence, Lyon, Strasbourg, Bordeaux, Budapest, Málaga, Luxembourg and Shanghai.

The school offers several programmes, including a five-year course (known as the "Grande École" program) delivering a diploma approved by the French state and conferring the degree of master.

Triple accredited (AACSB, AMBA, and EQUIS), ESSCA is also a member of the Conférence des Grandes Ecoles.

== Overview ==
ESSCA competitive entrance exam takes place after the Baccalauréat, in contrast to some French graduate schools that recruit their students after two years of preparatory classes. The graduate school relies on this exam to keep its admission rate at no more than 600 students per year.

=== History ===
==== Creation and development ====
Founded in 1909 by the Dean of the Faculty of Law of the Catholic University of the West, ESSCA became an association (according to the French law of 1901) in 1967 and gained EESPIG certification (as a non-profit institution that works in partnership with the government to contribute to higher education and research) in 2016.

The school began by offering a two-year degree, which was extended to three years in 1954. In parallel with its change of location in Angers with the campus move to Belle-Beille, ESSCA's programs were extended in 1969 to four years. Recognized by the State in 1975, ESSCA was the first school offering direct entry after the baccalaureate to become a member of the Conférence des Grandes Écoles in 1977. The school reached the level of older French business schools. It obtained authorization to issue a state recognised diploma in 1980. In 1987, a new building (3,500 m2) was inaugurated on the Belle-Beille site. In 1993, the school opened its Paris and Budapest campuses. Since 1999 the school's masters programs have been completed in five years, aligning the MSc in management with comparable business schools in France and Europe.

ESSCA joined the ‘Management Chapter’ of the Conférence des Grandes Écoles in 1993. As part of the Bologna Process and the Bachelor-Master-Doctorate reforms, the duration of the main programme ("Grande École") was increased to 5 years in 1998, providing an integrated master's programme

The global expansion of the school started in the 1980s was consolidated by the opening of its Shanghai campus in 2006. At its 100th anniversary in 2009, ESSCA had campuses in Angers, Paris, Budapest and Shanghai.

==== Recent developments ====
In 2001, the site In Angers was enlarged by 2,500 m2. From 2004 onwards, and after having integrated the Bologna reforms, the "Grande École" programme was recognised as a master's degree. This same programme obtained its first international accreditation in 2006: the EFMD Programme Accreditation System (EPAS) from EFMD. ESSCA was the first post-baccalaureate business school to obtain this accreditation. The 2006-2010 period was marked by the opening of the Shanghai site (2007), the extension of the original site in Angers (2009) and the relocation of the Paris site to Boulogne-Billancourt (2010), in order to accommodate larger numbers. In 2012, the "Grande École" programme offered its first apprenticeship work-based specialization in the fourth and fifth years.

ESIAME (the Bachelors level programme) left the ESSCA group in 2009, to be taken up by the Maine-et-Loire chamber of commerce and industry. The programme re-joined the ESSCA portfolio in 2016. At the start of the 2016 school year, the programme was available in Cholet and in Paris under the name Bachelor of Business Management (BBM) in International Management (ESIAME). Since then the Bachelor programme has developed and been renamed Bachelor in International Management (BMI) and is now also provided on the Aix-en-Provence, Bordeaux and Lyon campuses.

== Accreditations and memberships ==
ESSCA grants a Grande École master's degree (MSc in management), including several options for double-degree arrangements with French and foreign business schools and universities in Economics, International Business and other subjects. The institution is also a member of the "Conférence des Grandes écoles".

ESSCA received EPAS accreditation from the European Foundation for Management Development on 24 April 2006, becoming the first French graduate school to be awarded this international label. In May 2014, ESSCA also received AACSB-accreditation and was awarded the EQUIS accreditation in June 2016.

In 2017, ESSCA was accredited by the AMBA, and thus joined the 1% business schools worldwide with triple accreditation.

== See also ==
- Education in France
- Grandes écoles
