= Liaison Committee for the Presidential Majority =

- Formation: June 30, 2009
- Type: Co-ordination structure of allied political parties
- Headquarters: 216, Boulevard Saint-Germain; Paris, France
- Members: Union for a Popular Movement, Radical Party, Christian Democratic Party, The Progressives, New Centre, Modern Left, Movement for France, Hunting, Fishing, Nature, Tradition
- President: Jean-Claude Gaudin

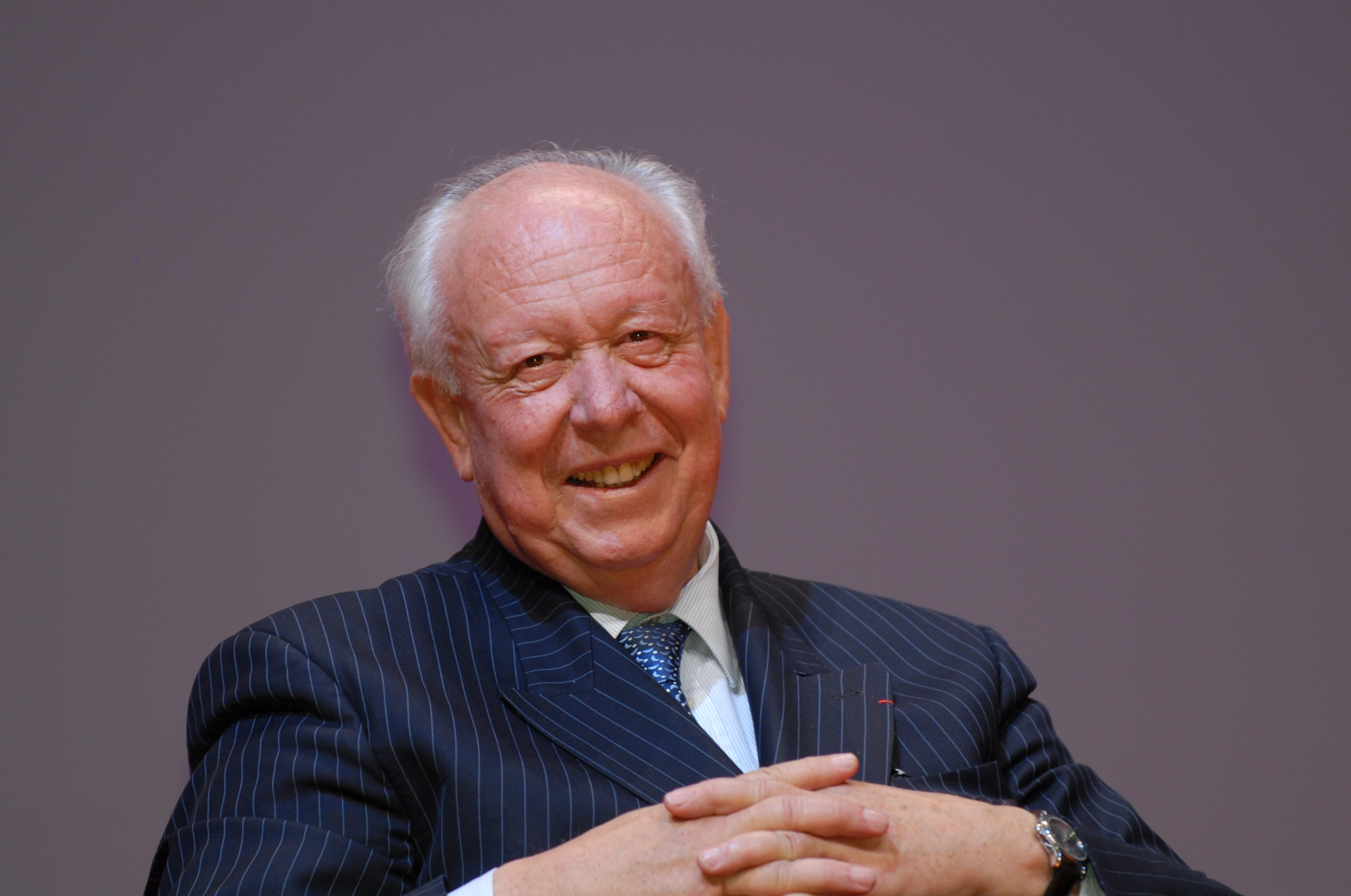
Jean-Claude Gaudin, 2008

The Liaison Committee for the Presidential Majority (French: Comité de liaison de la majorité présidentielle, also called the Committee of the Presidential Majority or Committee of the Majority) was a structure initiated by Nicolas Sarkozy to coordinate the political parties that support his action.

It was officially established by François Fillon on June 30, 2009, and is led by Jean-Claude Gaudin, member of the national executive of the Union for a Popular Movement.

== Creation ==
On April 9, 2008, following the municipal and cantonal elections of 2008, the President of the Republic, Nicolas Sarkozy, announced the creation of a liaison committee to strengthen ties within the majority, intensify the level of work between the components and prepare for future elections.

This committee would be composed of the main political leaders of the presidential majority: Patrick Devedjian (Secretary General of the UMP), Jean-Pierre Raffarin and Jean-Claude Gaudin (vice-chairmen of the National Council of the UMP), Bernard Accoyer (President of the National Assembly), Christian Poncelet (President of the Senate), Henri de Raincourt (President of the UMP group in the Senate), Xavier Bertrand (Deputy Secretary General of the UMP), Christine Boutin (President of the Christian Democratic Party), Michèle Alliot-Marie (president of Le Chêne club), Jean-Louis Borloo (president of the Radical Party), Hervé Morin (President of New Centre), François Sauvadet (President of the NC group in the National Assembly), Michel Mercier (ex-chairman of the UC-UDF Group in the Senate), Jean-Marie Cavada (President of the ACDE), Jean-Marie Bockel (Chairman of the Modern Left) and Eric Besson (President of The Progressives).

Without significant business since its inception, the committee became formally structured as a result of the 2009 European elections during which the lists of the presidential majority came first. It was inaugurated by Prime Minister François Fillon on June 30, 2009, on the occasion of the inauguration of its offices.

== Party members ==
- Union for a Popular Movement (UMP)

=== UMP 'associated' parties ===
- Radical Party (PR)
- Christian Democratic Party (PCD)
- The Progressives (LP)

=== UMP allied parties ===
- New Centre (NC)
- Modern Left (LGM)
- Movement for France (MPF)
- Hunting, Fishing, Nature, Tradition (CPNT)

== Objectives ==
After meeting informally since January 2009 and taking part in the preparation of the presidential majority's lists ahead of the European elections in June, the committee aims to prepare the forthcoming elections, most notably the regional elections in 2010.

According to François Fillon, the committee will also be "a laboratory of ideas, a place of confrontation between different projects that represent the broadest diversity possible in French society."

== Organization ==
The committee consists of about twenty people who will meet once a month. It is chaired by Jean-Claude Gaudin.
