= KEDGE Business School =

French Business School

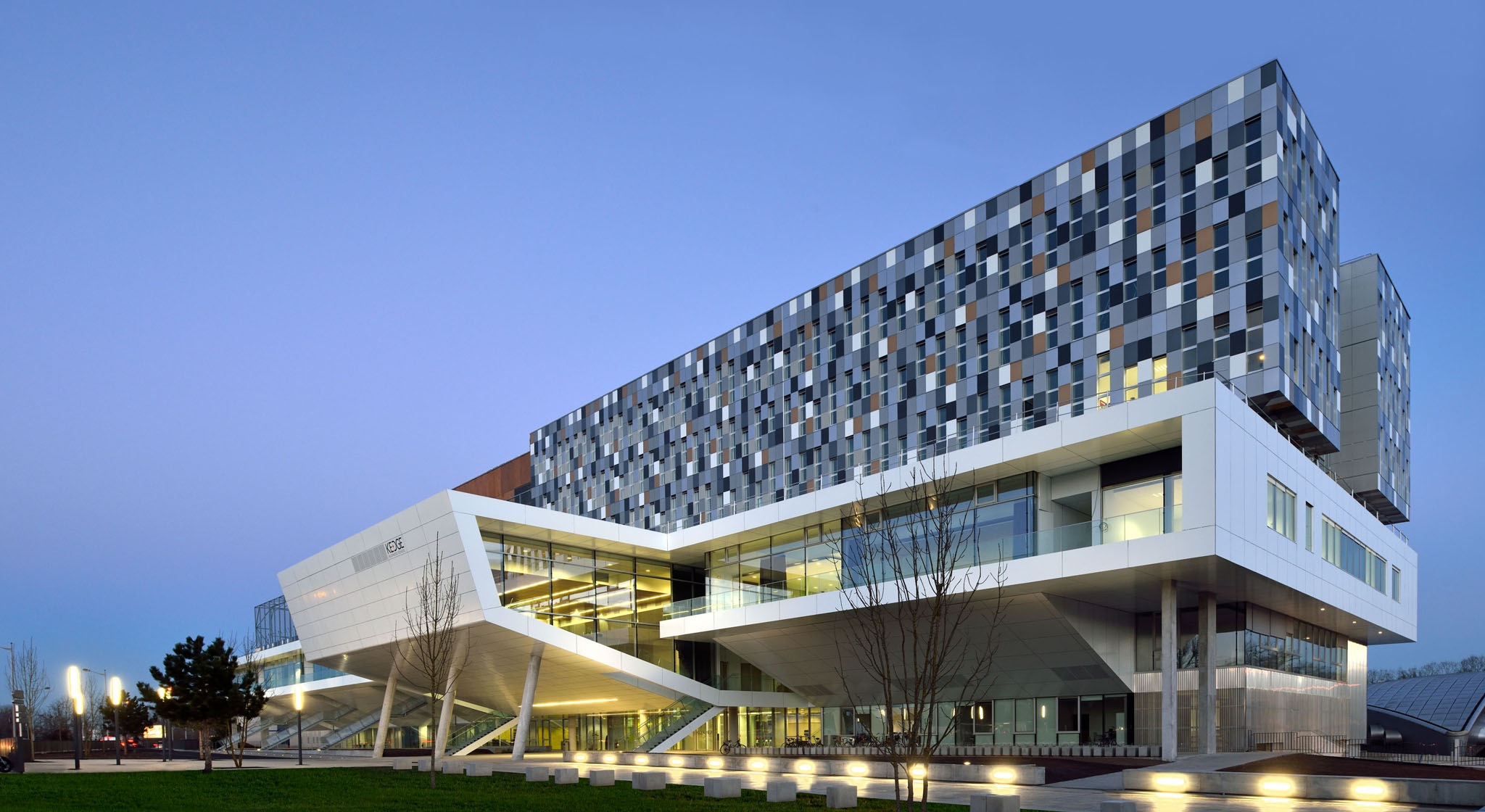
- Former names: EUROMED (est.1872) and BEM (est.1874) merger
- Type: Grande école de commerce et de management (Private research university Business school)
- Established: 2013; 13 years ago
- Accreditation: Triple accreditation: AACSB; AMBA; EQUIS
- Academic affiliations: Conférence des grandes écoles,
- Director: Alexandre de Navailles
- Academic staff: 172; 97% PhD.; 33% female; 46% international
- Students: 14,800
- Location: France: Marseille, Bordeaux, Toulon, Paris; China: Suzhou, Shanghai; Senegal: Dakar; Côte d'Ivoire: Abidjan
- Campus: 8
- Language: English-only & French-only instruction
- Website: kedge.edu
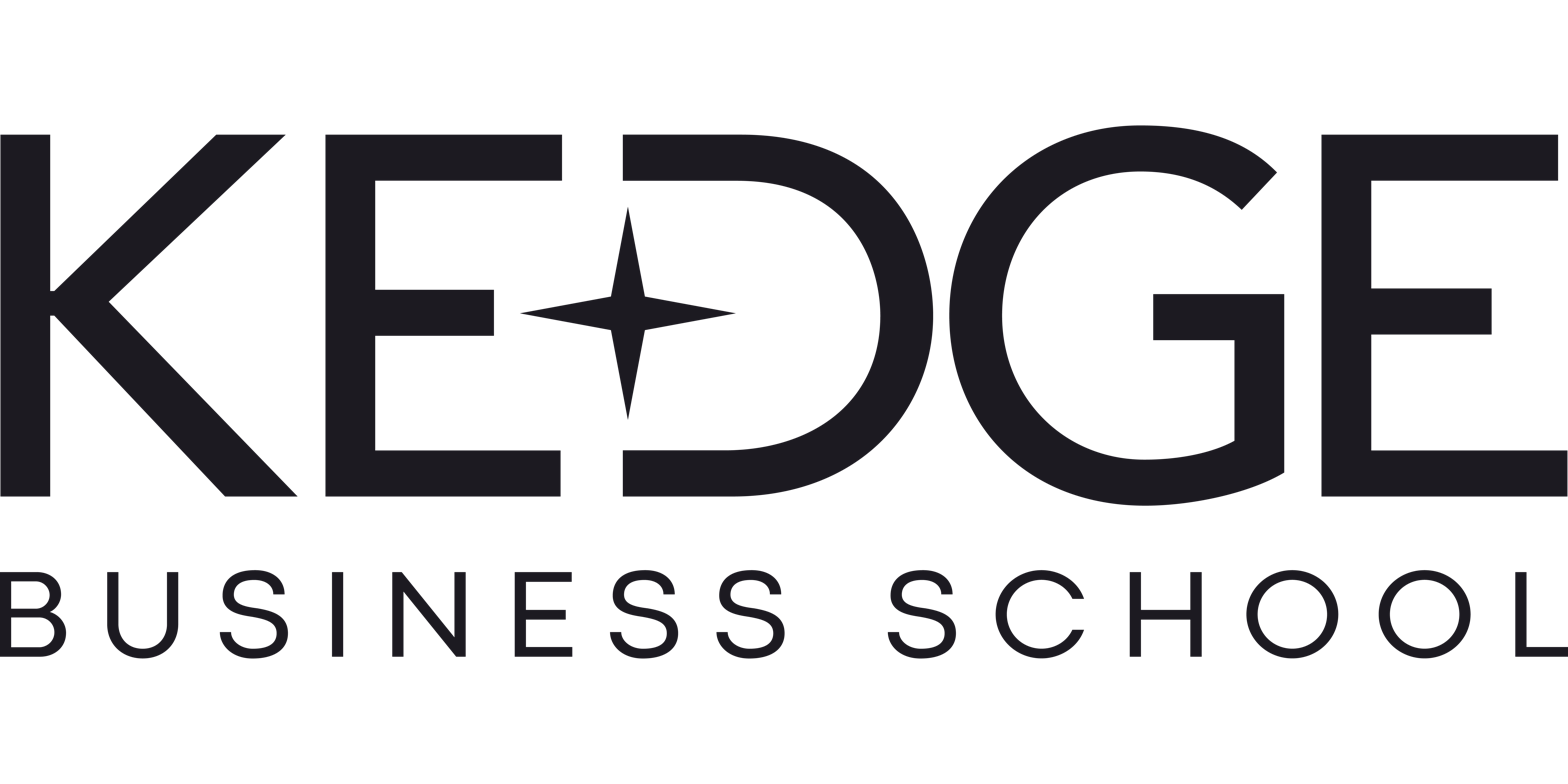

KEDGE Business School is a triple accredited (AACSB, EQUIS and AMBA) French business school and grande école. The Grande Ecole was founded in 2013 from the merger of two middle business schools: Bordeaux Ecole de Management (ESC Bordeaux), founded in 1874 in Bordeaux; and EUROMED Management in Marseilles (ESC Marseille), founded in 1872 in Marseille. KEDGE has campuses in France (Marseille, Bordeaux, Toulon, Paris); Senegal (Dakar); Côte d'Ivoire (Abidjan); and China (Shanghai, Suzhou).

== History ==
KEDGE business school was recently created in 2013, but it is the result of a merger of two of the earliest business schools in existence: BEM (Bordeaux Management School) in Bordeaux founded in 1874 and EUROMED Management in Marseilles founded in 1872.

- 1872 - École Supérieure de Commerce de Marseille (ESC Marseille, later EUROMED) founded. (now called: KEDGE Business School, Marseille)
- 1874 - École Supérieure de Commerce de Bordeaux (ESC Bordeaux, later BEM) founded. (now called: KEDGE Business School, Bordeaux)
- 1968 - ESC Marseille establishes a new campus in Luminy, France.
- 1969 - ESC Bordeaux establishes a new campus in Talence, France.
- 2001 - ESC Bordeaux awarded EQUIS accreditation.
- 2005 - ESC Marseille awarded EQUIS accreditation.
- 2007 - ESC Bordeaux and ESC Marseille awarded AMBA accreditation.
- 2008 - ESC Bordeaux establishes a new campus in Dakar, Senegal.
- 2009 - ESC Bordeaux awarded AACSB accreditation.
- 2010 - ESC Marseille establishes a new campus in Suzhou, China, and launches the Institut Franco-Chinese in partnership with Renmin University of China.
- 2010 - ESC Marseille acquires Toulon Ecole Supérieure de Commerce et Technologie (ESCT) and Ecole Internationale de Design (EID)
- 2011 - ESC Marseille awarded AACSB accreditation
- 2012 - ESC Bordeaux (BEM) and ESC Marseille (EUROMED) merge
- 2013 - KEDGE Business School founded.
- 2015 - KEDGE establishes a new campus in Paris, France.
- 2018 and 2019 - New campuses in Paris and Toulon, Marseille campus extension and new spaces on Bordeaux campus
- 2019 - Ph.D. program launched and KEDGE Design in Marseille opened.

== Grande école degrees ==
KEDGE Business School is a grande école, a French institution of higher education that is separate from, but parallel and often connected to, the main framework of the French public university system. Grandes écoles are elite academic institutions that admit students through an extremely competitive process, and a significant proportion of their graduates occupy the highest levels of French society. Similar to Ivy League schools in the United States, Oxbridge in the UK, and C9 League in China, graduation from a grande école is considered the prerequisite credential for any top government, administrative and corporate position in France.

The degrees are accredited by the Conférence des Grandes Écoles and awarded by the Ministry of National Education (France). Higher education business degrees in France are organized into three levels thus facilitating international mobility: the Licence / Bachelor's degrees, and the Master's and Doctorat degrees. The Bachelors and the Masters are organized in semesters: 6 for the Bachelors and 4 for the Masters. Those levels of study include various "parcours" or paths based on UE (Unités d'enseignement or Modules), each worth a defined number of European credits (ECTS). A student accumulates those credits, which are generally transferable between paths. A Bachelors is awarded once 180 ECTS have been obtained (bac + 3); a Masters is awarded once 120 additional credits have been obtained (bac +5). The highly coveted PGE (Grand Ecole Program) ends with the degree of Master's in Management (MiM).

== Partnerships ==
KEDGE partners with 300 universities worldwide, several offering dual-degrees.

Dual Bachelors

- University of Ottawa, Canada
- University of Chile, Chile
- Huazhong University of Science and Technology, China
- Zagreb School of Economics and Management, Croatia
- JAMK University of Applied Sciences, Finland
- University of Oulu, Finland
- American College of Greece, Greece
- Hochschule Bremen, Germany
- University of Göttingen, Germany
- International School of Management, Germany, Germany
- Corvinus University of Budapest, Hungary
- University of Limerick, Ireland
- KU Leuven, Belgium
- Zuyd University of Applied Sciences, Netherlands
- University of Groningen, Netherlands
- Kozminski University, Poland
- ISM University of Management and Economics, Lithuania
- ISCTE – University Institute of Lisbon, Portugal
- Plekhanov Russian University of Economics, Russia
- University of Ljubljana, Slovenia
- SolBridge International School of Business, South Korea
- University of Deusto, Spain
- Jönköping University, Sweden
- Northumbria University, UK
- University of Hertfordshire, UK
- Weber State University, USA
- Hofstra University, USA
- University of North Florida, USA
- University of Wisconsin–Green Bay, USA

Dual Masters

- University of São Paulo, Brazil
- Brock University, Canada
- Université Laval, Canada
- Andrés Bello National University, Chile
- University of Vaasa, Finland
- Kozminski University, Poland
- ISM University of Management and Economics, Lithuania
- Umeå School of Business, Sweden
- National Sun Yat-sen University, Taiwan
- Nottingham Trent University, UK
- Aston University, UK
- Centre Franco-Vietnamien de formation à la Gestion, Vietnam

== Programmes ==
=== Undergraduate programmes (Bachelor and Master) ===
- International BBA (Marseille)

=== Exchange programmes ===
- EBP International (Bordeaux)
- KEDGE Bachelor (Bordeaux, Marseille, Toulon, Avignon, Bastia, Bayonne, Dakar)

=== Post-graduate programmes ===
- Digital Marketing & Sales (Marseille)
- Arts & Creative Industries Management (Paris)
- Innovation, Transformation, Entrepreneurship (Marseille)
- Management Control and Reporting (Marseille)
- Corporate Finance (Marseille)
- PhD (Doctor of Philosophy in Business Administration) (Bordeaux, Marseille)
- Banking & Finance (Bordeaux)
- MVS - Wine & Spirits Management (Bordeaux)
- Master of Science in Wine & Hospitality Management (Bordeaux, Paris, Lausanne)
- MAI - International Purchasing & Innovation Management (Bordeaux)
- Marketing (Marseille, Bordeaux, Paris)
- ISLI - Global Supply Chain Management (Bordeaux)
- International Trade & Logistics (Bordeaux)
- Sustainable Finance (Paris)
- International Business (Bordeaux, Paris, Marseille)
- Sport - International sport & event management (Marseille)
- Master in Management Grande Ecole (Bordeaux, Marseille)

=== Short-term programmes ===
- The KEDGE International Winter School (now digital)

== International rankings ==
- In 2019, the Financial Times has ranked KEDGE's Master in Management 49th worldwide, and the Executive MBA 39th worldwide & 15th in Europe.
- In 2020, KEDGE BS was ranked 151st in the QS WUR Ranking for Business & Management.
- In 2021, KEDGE BS was ranked 41st in the QS World University Rankings for Masters in Management.
- In 2021, KEDGE BS was ranked 30th in the QS World University Rankings for Masters in Marketing Rankings.
- In 2022, KEDGE Business School's MSc International Business ranked 10th in the QS International Trade Rankings in partnership with the Hinrich Foundation.
- In 2026, KEDGE BS was ranked 201-250 in the QS WUR Ranking for Business & Management.

== Campus extension ==
In 2018, the expansion project in the Luminy campus (in the Adhesion Zone of the Calanques Natural park) is still controversial, with plans to modify 11,000 square meters of nature. According to critics, around 600 centennial trees will be cut down while the director of school says the old trees will be preserved.

== Alumni ==
- Daniel Carrasso (1905–2009): son of the founder of Danone, built up the group into a multinational business.
- Patrick Mennucci (1955–): French politician, former MP of the Bouches-du-Rhône's 4th constituency from June 2012 to June 2017.
- Xavier Rolet (1959–): ex-CEO of the London Stock Exchange Group.
- Sophie Cluzel (1961–): French politician, serving as the Secretary of State in charge of People with Disabilities in the Philippe Government since 17 May 2017.
- Ayodelé Ikuesan (1985–): French sprinter who specialises in the 60 metres and 4 × 100 metres relay.
- Éric Pichet (1960–): French economist, professor at KEDGE.
