= Bilan d'aptitude délivré par les grandes écoles =

French degree

The Bilan d'aptitude délivré par les grandes écoles (BADGE, in English Assessment of competency issued by grandes écoles) is a French degree created in 2001 by the Conférence des Grandes Écoles and primarily intended for owners of a two-year degree after the Baccalauréat.

== Presentation ==
According to the rules of organization of training programs accredited by the Conférence des Grandes Écoles, ""The BADGE ... of the School... " is a registered collective ownership of the Conférence des Grandes Écoles, attributed to a specific training organized by a school member of the CGE. It is intended primarily for owners of a two-year degree after the Baccalauréat.

Be considered applicants who hold one of the following qualifications:

- Two-year degree after the Baccalauréat;
- Baccalauréat and a significant professional experience relevant to the subject of the application of at least five years.

The BADGE program necessarily includes a number of common elements: at least 200 hours of instruction, including theoretical, practical work, team projects and possibly distance learning and a final validation test. The program takes place over a period of 7 weeks to 24 months maximum, subject to alternating training / business where the period exceeds 6 months and is 15 to 25 ECTS-credits.
