= École supérieure de commerce de Reims =

Coordinates: 49.238549°N 4.003180°E

École supérieure de commerce de Reims ("ESC Reims" or "Sup de Co Reims"), is one of France's leading Grandes Ecoles of management. Founded in 1928, it belongs to Reims Management School (RMS), a group of schools accredited EQUIS, AMBA and AACSB.

Le Nouvel Économiste magazine and l'Étudiant magazine classify "Sup de Co Reims" program at the 8th rank of French business schools in 2009.

== Sup de Co specificities ==
The Sup de Co program was the first one to be developed by Reims Management School. Requiring three years training after admission, it is accredited by the Ministry of Education as a master's degree.

== Admission ==
A minimum of 2 years under-graduate studies are necessary to undertake the competitive exam compulsory to enter Sup de Co. Different exams are organized according to initial education:

Preparatory class students: Ecricome examination, direct integration in the Bachelor year 2-year undergraduates: Tremplin 1 exam, direct integration in the Bachelor year 3-year undergraduates: Tremplin 2 exam, integration in the second year also known as PCM

== The program ==
The program is divided into two cycles: the Bachelor cycle and the Master cycle.

=== Bachelor cycle ===
This first cycle is common to all students coming from Ecricome contest or Tremplin 1. It lasts one year and has the goal of learning the basic concepts of management and business.

Students are encouraged to show initiative through group projects called "Team Leaders". As such, students can open their own association, create events on the campus, organize forums and debates.

The school also attaches great importance to personal development to improve critical thinking and open mindedness. Personal development seminars, general culture courses help students develop awareness of their priorities and talents. Meetings with exceptional personalities such as Franck Riboud - Danone's CEO - help them develop their landmarks.

Flexibility translates into the possibility of choosing electives as from the first year, or materializing an already developed professional project with an additional internship in France or abroad.

The sup de Co degree course may now be followed in English as from the first year.

Students earn their passage by validating 12 credits, 11 corresponding to the examinations and multi-material, they spend during the five year partial, corresponding to a validation of their internship at the end of 1st year.

=== Master cycle ===
This period represents the specialization and majoring cycle of the program. It last two years.

It is characterized by a tailor-made program called "electives". Each student has the opportunity to choose his own path among numerous electives (approximately 90) and can thus specialize according to their own ambitions and needs.

An elective is the 3-week course (6 for some subjects) evaluated by either an examination or continuous monitoring, or by a combination of both. Each elective, lasting 45 hours addresses a specific theme in a major management areas (Finance, Marketing, Accounting, etc.).

At the end of the second year, students typically perform their 6-month internship and go on an exchange program abroad.

The third year is marked by writing a thesis on a particular issue supervised by a tutor. This thesis remains one of the conditions necessary for graduation.

Students are free to pursue their courses in a fourth year (at no extra cost) if they chose to make a longer internship, or postpone their departure abroad.

== See also ==
- Reims Management School
