= Institut de Formation Internationale =

- Established: 1986
- President: Sarah Cooper
- Location: Rouen, France
- Website: www.ifi-rouen.com

Institut de Formation Internationale (IFI) is a business school in Rouen, France. The school is part of the ESC Rouen group of schools, and offers Bachelor of Business Administration degrees. IFI is EQUIS accredited by the EFMD (European Foundation for Management Education), and has the highest accreditation of the Ministry of Education ("visa").

The aim of IFI is to train students for careers in trade and management in companies with an international dimension. Immersion in the field of international business is the IFI's strong point; each student spends one year in a foreign university and carries out a six-month internship in a company outside France. Altogether, IFI students have the advantage of 18 months experience abroad. Skills such as awareness of intercultural differences, flexibility and adaptability, fluency in foreign languages (two languages compulsory), and expertise of international business are developed by the IFI programme.

The school teams up with prestigious international partners such as Georgetown University (McDonough School of Business), University of Western Ontario (Richard Ivey School of Business), Indiana University (Kelley School of Business), Calpoly State University, or the Hong Kong University of Science and Technology.
