= International Standard Link Identifier =

Identifier standard

The International Standard Link Identifier (ISLI), is an identifier standard. ISLI is a universal identifier for links between entities in the field of information and documentation. It was developed by the International Organization for Standardization (ISO) and published on May 15, 2015. ISO/TC 46/SC 9 is responsible for the development of the ISLI standard.

ISLI is used for identifying links between entities in the field of information and documentation. A linked entity can be physical, e.g. a print book or an electronic resource (text, audio, and video); or something abstract, e.g. a physical position within a frame of reference or the time of day. An Indian Standard IS-17316:2015 has been made adapting IS:17316:2015. The Bureau of Indian Standards (BIS) has made the standard available for sale on their website and through their offices across India. The Gazette notification was done on the 7th of July, 2020 by the Govt of India. The ISLI Codes can be issued in India from https://www.isliindia.org free of cost. This will help standardise talking books in India also.

In the context of modern information technology, the application of resources in the field of information and documentation is increasingly getting diversified. Isolated content products can no longer satisfy the ever-increasing user demand.

Using a link identifier to build links between resources in the field of information and documentation provides a basis for a combined application of resources in the field, and supports collaborative creation of content and data interoperability between systems.

The openness of the ISLI system will boost the emergence of new applications in both multimedia and other fields, which increases the value of the linked-resources.

== Link model ==
The link model of ISLI includes three elements: a source, a target, and the link between them. A link identified by an ISLI code is unidirectional from the source to the target.

== Format ==
An ISLI code consists of three parts: service code, link code and check digit. The service code comprises six decimal digits. The link code comprises decimal digits and its length is defined for each service. The check digit contains one decimal digit calculated from the service code and the link code. It is used for error detection.

== Display ==
An ISLI code shall be shown in the format " ISLI XXXXXX-XXXXX-X". The hyphen is used for separating the three fields (service code, link code and check digit) and the word "ISLI" must be prefixed.

== Administration ==
The ISLI system is administered by the ISLI Registration Authority (ISLI RA). And the International Information Content Industry Association (ICIA), a not-for-profit organization headquartered in Hong Kong, acts as the ISLI Registration Authority. ICIA is responsible for the maintenance of the ISLI system and other responsibilities specified in the ISLI standard.

== Benefits ==
The ISLI standard provides a way of linking entities without changing the properties of those entities, e.g. ownership, access rights and identifiers that are used to identify those entities.

== Obtaining a service code ==
To obtain a service code, the following procedures shall be followed: Decide the type of the specific link application. Search the list of link types in the ISLI RA Website to find the desired link type. Draw up the operational plan. Submit application for a service code, and specify the data access rights when registering metadata. Build the Service Provider Application and provide services to users.
