= Conférence des Grandes écoles =

French national institution created in 1973

- Conférence des Grandes écoles
- Nickname: CGE
- Formation: 16 May 1973; 53 years ago
- Founder: Philippe Olmer
- Founded at: Assemblée générale constitutive (consultative general assembly) at: École Nationale Supérieure des Arts et Métiers (Paris)
- Type: Association of Grandes écoles
- Legal status: (association law 1901)
- Purpose: Advocacy. National and International.
- Headquarters: 11 rue Carrier-Belleuse
- Location: Paris, France
- Origins: French student protests of May 1968
- Products: Summaries, studies and surveys in higher education for the French national education plan
- Services: Accrediting body. Guarantees the quality of educational programs.
- Method: Think tank, commissions, working groups.
- Fields: Primarily engineering, management, architecture, design, and political studies
- Members: 248 Grandes écoles, all recognized by the State, delivering a master's degree or higher.
- Official language: French
- Website: cge.asso.fr

The Conférence des Grandes Écoles (French pronunciation: [kɔ̃feʁɑ̃s de ɡʁɑ̃dz‿ekɔl]; French for "Conference of Grandes Écoles"; abbr. CGE) is a French national institution, created in 1973. It mainly acts as an association of Grandes Écoles, providing representation, research and accreditation. A Grande école is a French institution of higher education that is separate from, but parallel and often connected to, the main framework of the French public university system.

Since 2010, many of Grandes Écoles have been part of the new collegiate universities, that have emerged from prestigious universities and under the status of 'Grand établissement', such as the PSL University, the Saclay University, the Polytechnic University of Paris or the Assas University.

Grandes écoles are academic institutions that admit students through a competitive process, and a significant proportion of their graduates occupy the highest levels of French society.

Not all Grandes écoles are members of the conference. To be a member, Grandes écoles must be accredited for postgraduate education and apply a strict criteria for: student recruitment and enrollment; instruction and programs; international research and reputation; connections with private industry; and student support.

== Accreditation ==
The CGE provides nearly 600 accredited training courses and a range of training and research in line with the French labor market. Each of the Conférence des grandes écoles and CGE labels attests to the quality of a complete training process at each school and ensures compliance with these fundamental principles: excellence, professional integration, international openness, training accreditation. As an accreditation body, the CGE created an Accreditation Commission made up of 32 experts, headed by Stéphanie Lavigne, General Manager at TBS Education, to grant the training courses offered by its member schools one of the quality labels of the CGE. The CGE maintains the level of quality and excellence that defines its member schools by investigating requests for first accreditation and when a CGE school's accreditation period expires or when their content and training methods change, and through random checks and on-site audits.

CGE accredited programs:

- Programme Grande École (PGE) - A flagship, five-year professional training program that ends with a Bac+5 level diploma, such as a Masters in Management, Masters in Engineering, Masters in Veterinary Medicine, etc.
- Master of Science (MSc) French: Mastère en sciences - Mastery of an international, specialized field (such as finance, data science, fluids engineering, etc.) with at least half of all courses taught in English. Program ends with a Bac+5 or a Bac+6 level diploma, such as MSc in: Artificial Intelligence & Business Analytics; European Animal Management; Luxury & Fashion Management.
- Specialized Master (MS) French: Mastère spécialisé - An advanced level mastery in a specific field. Program ends with a Bac+6 level diploma, such as MS in: Administration and Public Policy; Biomedical Technology; or Œnology/Wines.
- BADGE French: Bilan d'aptitude délivré par les grandes écoles - A training certification for Bac+2 graduates or those with 5 years of professional experience.
- CQC (Certificate of Qualification and Skills) - Short courses and certification directed at a particular set of professional needs.

== Prestige ==
Grandes Écoles are highly selective public or private institutions accredited by the CGE with degrees are awarded by the Ministry of Higher Education (France) (French: Ministère de l'Enseignement supérieur) and recognized worldwide. Most Grandes Écoles are dedicated to business and engineering, but there are also the Écoles Normales Supérieures (ENS), the institutes of political studies (IEP), veterinary schools, journalism schools, and other schools in a variety of specialized areas. Although they are more expensive than public universities in France, Grandes Écoles typically have smaller class sizes and student bodies and many of their programs are taught in English. International internships, study abroad opportunities, and close ties with government and the corporate world are a hallmark of the Grandes Écoles.

Out of the 250 business schools in France, only 39 are Conférence des Grandes Écoles members, and many CGE Grandes Écoles are among the top ranked business schools in Europe.

Financial Times – European Business Schools (CGE members-only)	2019	2020	2021	Female faculty 2021
HEC Paris	1	1	1	30%
Insead, Sorbonne University Alliance	5	3	3	22%
ESSEC Business School, CY Alliance	7	6	8	36%
ESCP Business School, Panthéon-Sorbonne Alliance	14	8	14	38%
EDHEC Business School, Catholic University of Lille	15	14	10	33%
EMLyon Business School	20	20	19	40%
Grenoble Ecole de Management	25	28	36	47%
Audencia	40	45	31	44%
EM Normandie Business School	81	83	86	40%
ESC Clermont Business School	95			
ESSCA School of Management	76	70		
Excelia Business School	79	63	64	51%
Burgundy School of Business	81	80	82	49%
ICN Business School	69		80	55%
IÉSEG School of Management	64	55	62	46%
Institut Mines-Télécom Business School	75	73	84	48%
ISC Paris	88			
Kedge Business School	31	34	40	33%
Montpellier Business School	69	72	75	45%
Neoma Business School	50	39	44	44%
Paris Dauphine University, PSL University	89			
Paris School of Business		88		
Rennes School of Business	56	68	88	34%
Skema Business School	49		48	37%
TBS Education	57	58	58	50%

Times Higher Education ranked these Grandes Écoles in the top 20 worldwide (small universities: fewer than 5,000 students):

Times Higher Education – top 20 small universities worldwide (CGE members-only)	2017	2018	2019	2020	2021
École Polytechnique, Polytechnic University of Paris	4th	2nd	2nd	2nd	2nd
École normale supérieure de Lyon, University of Lyon	7th	5th	7th	9th	11th (tied)
Télécom Paris, Saclay University				6th	11th (tied)
École des Ponts ParisTech			9th		7th
École normale supérieure Paris-Saclay, Saclay University		18th			
École normale supérieure (Paris), PSL University	2nd				

Several CGE members have roots in the 18th and early 19th centuries, and a few are even older than the term Grande école, which dates to 1794. Grandes écoles in the 18th century focused mostly on training civil servants and military engineers, and the curriculum was primarily mathematics and physical sciences. During the early 19th century, a number of Grandes écoles were established to support industry and commerce. Some CGE members are among the oldest continually operating educational institutions in France. All schools were founded on a non-sectarian basis.

CGE member: founded 200+ years ago	Founded as	Year founded	Founding affiliation
École nationale supérieure de techniques avancées, Polytechnic University of Paris	École nationale supérieure du génie maritime	1741	Established to teach Naval engineering, the school closed at the start of the French Revolution, and re-opened in 1793.
École des ponts ParisTech	École nationale des ponts et chaussées	1747	Founded originally to train engineering officials and civil engineers, its focus is on education and research in the field of science, engineering and technology.
École nationale vétérinaire d'Alfort		1765	A Grande école for veterinarians that initially focused on animal anatomy, shoeing, therapy and surgery.
Arts et Métiers ParisTech	Ecole d'Arts et Métiers	1780	Founded to provide in-depth training for military officers and their children, this Grande école focus is on engineering.
Mines ParisTech, PSL University	École pratique des Mines du Mont-Blanc	1783	A Grande école of engineering in continual operation since 1794.
École Polytechnique	École centrale des travaux publics	1794	Established during the French Revolution to teach math and science, became a military academy under Napoleon Bonaparte in 1804. The institution is still supervised by the Ministry of Armed Forces (France), but it now operates as a public engineering Grande École.
École normale supérieure (ENS Paris)	École normale de l'an III	1794	Established during the French Revolution to provide homogeneous training to teachers in France.
Conservatoire national des arts et métiers		1794	Along with École Polytechnique and the École Normale Supérieure, this Grande école was created during the French Revolution for training and research in science and technology.
École spéciale militaire de Saint-Cyr		1802	Created by Napoleon Bonaparte to replace the École Royale Militaire. The school was mostly disbanded in 1942 during the time of occupation by Nazi Germany, but French cadet officer training (Cadets de la France Libre) went on in Cherchell (Algeria; then Free French territory) and in the United Kingdom under the command of General Charles de Gaulle .
École nationale supérieure des mines de Saint-Étienne	École nationale supérieure des mineurs	1816	A Grande école of engineering in continual operation since 1816.
Beaux-Arts de Paris	Écoles des beaux-arts	1817	Founded by the Royal Academy of Painting and Sculpture to teach the arts.
ESCP Business School	Ecole Supérieure de Commerce de Paris	1819	Modeled after the École Polytechnique, it is the world's oldest continuously operating school of commerce and management.
École Nationale des Chartes	École des Chartes	1821	The institute was created by order of King Louis XVIII to train archivists and historians, but its roots go further back to the French Revolution and the Napoleonic period.

== Founding members ==
- École Centrale des Arts et Manufactures (École Centrale Paris - ECP)
- École des Hautes Études Commerciales (HEC Paris)
- École Nationale des Ponts et Chaussées (Ponts - ENPC)
- École Nationale Supérieure de l'Aéronautique et de l'Espace (ISAE-SUPAERO)
- École Nationale Supérieure des Arts et Métiers (Paris) (Arts et Métiers ParisTech - ENSAM)
- École Nationale Supérieure des Mines de Paris (Mines ParisTech - ENSM.P.)
- École Nationale Supérieure des Mines de Saint-Étienne (MINES Saint-Étienne)
- École Nationale Supérieure des Mines de Nancy (Mines Nancy)
- École Nationale Supérieure des Techniques Avancées (ENSTA Paris)
- École Nationale Supérieure des Télécommunications (Télécom Paris - ENST)
- École Polytechnique (École Polytechnique - EP or l'X)
- École Supérieure d'Electricité (Supélec - ESE)
- École Supérieure de Physique et Chimie Industrielle de la Ville de Paris (ESPCI Paris)
- Institut National Agronomique Paris-Grignon (Institut national agronomique Paris Grignon INA-PG)

== See also ==
- Commission Nationale de la Certification Professionnelle
- Commission des Titres d'Ingénieur
- Conférence des Directeurs des Écoles Françaises d'Ingénieurs
- Grandes écoles
- Council of NITSER
- Education in France
