= NEOMA Business School =

Business and management school in Paris, France

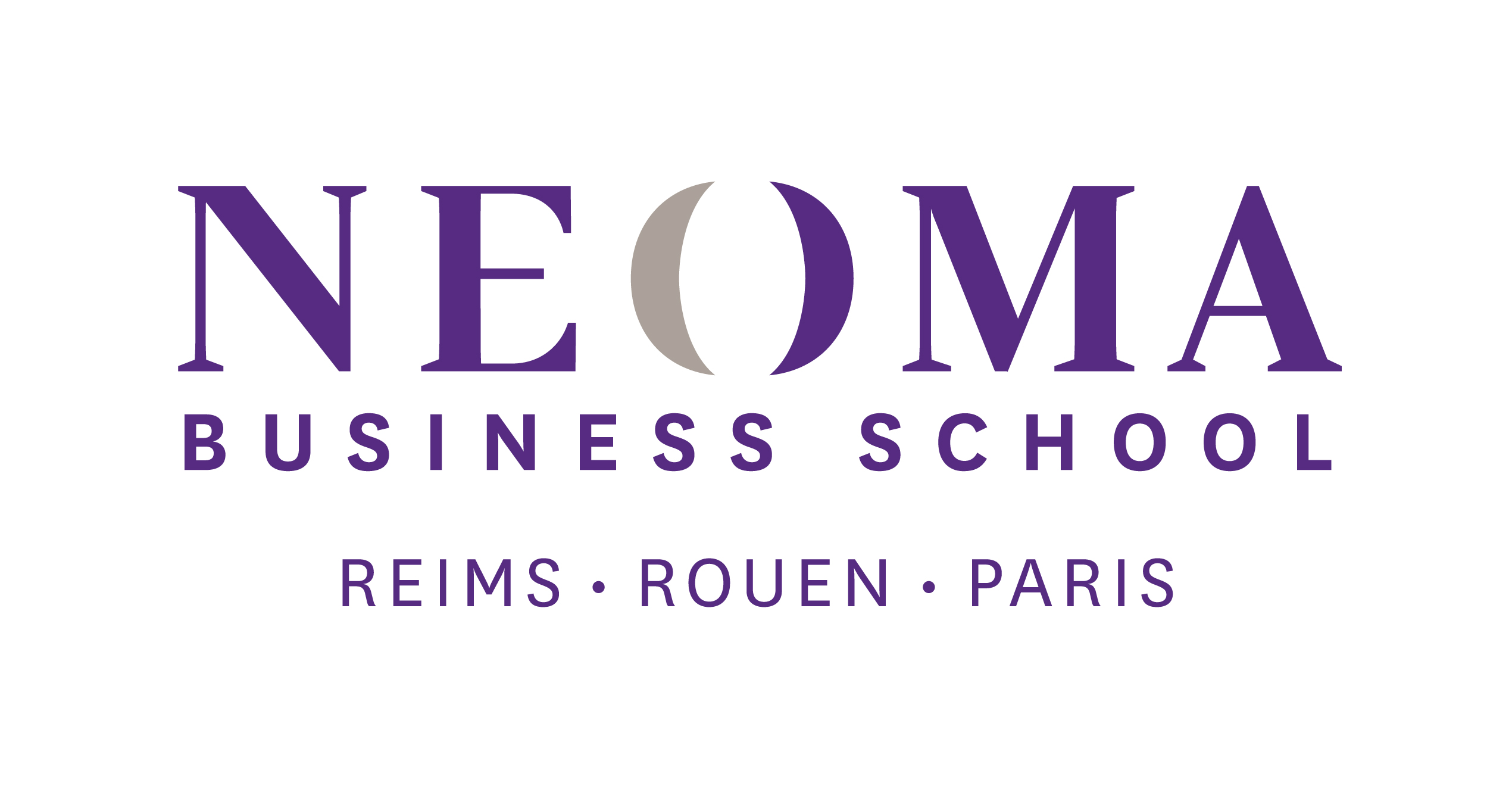
- Former names: Merger of Reims Management School (1928) and Rouen Business School (1871)
- Motto: Be passionate. Shape the future
- Type: Grande école de commerce et de management (Private research university Business school)
- Established: 2013; 13 years ago
- Accreditation: Triple accreditation: AACSB; AMBA; EQUIS
- Academic affiliations: Conférence des grandes écoles,
- Budget: 85 million euros
- President: Michel-Edouard Leclerc
- Dean: Delphine Manceau
- Faculty: 185 permanent faculty members 100% PhD.; 44% female; 72% international
- Students: 9,000; 25% international
- Location: Reims, Rouen, Paris, France
- Language: English-only & French-only instruction
- Website: www.neoma-bs.com (engl.)

Three NEOMA campuses in France

NEOMA Business School is a French business and management school founded in 2013, following the merger of Reims Management School (founded in 1928) and Rouen Business School (founded in 1871) for economic and strategic reasons.

NEOMA BS offers a wide range of educational programmes covering all fields of management such as bachelor's degrees, Master in Management, MBA and EMBA programs, specialized MSc programs, a PhD in management, and various executive education offerings. The school is consistently rated by the Financial Times, The Economist and Challenges as one of the top business schools in continental Europe and one of the leading business schools worldwide.

NEOMA is part of the Conférence des Grandes écoles, and is one of the only 1% of business schools in the world holding the Triple accreditation from the three international accreditation organisations, EQUIS, AACSB and AMBA. Presided over by Michel-Edouard Leclerc, the school has the status of a Consular Higher Education Institution (EESC). The school dean is Delphine Manceau.

Its student body is made up of 9,000 students, 25% of whom come from international backgrounds. The students study on the three different campuses in Reims, Rouen and Paris. Its merged Alumni Network becomes by size one of the leading alumni networks in France, with 72,000 graduates.

== History ==
The Advanced Business School of Rouen was created in 1873, in the Normandy's region. It took the name Rouen Business School at the beginning of the new millennium.

The Advanced Business School of Reims was created in 1928, in the Champagne's region. It took the name Reims Management School at the beginning of the new millennium.

NEOMA Business School was created at the start of the 2013 school year following the merger of the two middle schools. This merger was carried out by the regional Reims and Rouen Chambers of Commerce and Industry.

== Grande école degrees ==
NEOMA Business School is a grande école, a French institution of higher education that is separate from, but parallel and often connected to, the main framework of the French public university system. Grandes écoles are elite academic institutions that admit students through an extremely competitive process, and a significant proportion of their graduates occupy the highest levels of French society. Similar to Ivy League schools in the United States, Oxbridge in the UK, and C9 League in China, graduation from a grande école is considered the prerequisite credential for any top government, administrative and corporate position in France.

The degrees are accredited by the Conférence des Grandes Écoles and awarded by the Ministry of National Education (France). Higher education business degrees in France are organized into three levels thus facilitating international mobility: the Licence / Bachelor's degrees, and the Master's and Doctorat degrees. The Bachelors and the Masters are organized in semesters: 6 for the Bachelors and 4 for the Masters. Those levels of study include various "parcours" or paths based on UE (Unités d'enseignement or Modules), each worth a defined number of European credits (ECTS). A student accumulates those credits, which are generally transferable between paths. A Bachelors is awarded once 180 ECTS have been obtained (bac + 3); a Masters is awarded once 120 additional credits have been obtained (bac +5). The highly coveted PGE (Grand Ecole Program) ends with the degree of Master's in Management (MiM)

== Educational programmes ==
NEOMA Business School offers a broad portfolio of programmes covering undergraduate, graduate, executive and doctoral education.

Undergraduate programmes

- Global BBA — a four-year (Bac+4) bachelor's programme. The programme includes a general track and an international/double-degree track which incorporates elements of the former CESEM offering.
- TEMA (Tech, Digital & Innovation and Management) — an integrated five-year programme (Bac+5) combining management, technology, digital innovation and creative practice.
- Bachelor in Services Management (ECAL) — a three-year (Bac+3) bachelor programme focused on service and distribution/retail management; not an arts-and-design degree.

Graduate programmes

- Master in Management (Programme Grande École) — NEOMA's flagship postgraduate management programme (typically completed over two years after Bac+3 or as part of the Grande École track).
- MSc / Advanced Masters — a range of specialised master's programmes delivered in French and/or English in various fields such as finance, marketing, strategy and digital management.

Executive education

- Global Executive MBA — executive MBA programme for senior managers and executives.
- Customised corporate programmes — tailor-made training solutions for organisations and corporate clients.

Doctoral studies

- PhD in Management— a full-time doctoral research programme intended for students pursuing academic careers and high-level research.
- DBA (Doctor of Business Administration) — historically offered by the school; according to recent evaluation reports the DBA programme has been discontinued and is no longer active.

== International ==
The school teaches its students to apply solid managerial skills in a globalised and multicultural professional environment. In addition to providing multicultural exposure on its campuses, the curricula include immersive periods through student exchanges. NEOMA now has 400 partner universities in 61 countries.

=== Academic and economic links with China ===
NEOMA Business School, after being specifically selected by the Hanban, launched in 2014 the first Confucius Institute for Business of France, and the seventh in the world. Other Confucius Institutes for Business are notably present in the London School of Economics and the New York State University. NEOMA Business School, which welcomes each year 300 Chinese students, has many Chinese academic partners, among which Renmin University, the Beijing University of International Business and Economics, Nankai University and Wuhan University. NEOMA BS stated that the institute will act as a platform dedicated to the optimisation of economic relations between China and France by providing solutions and helping local companies develop their business activities in China. Laurent Fabius, a former French Foreign Minister, inaugurated the event. That same year, NEOMA Business School opened a Doctorate of Business Administration programme in Shanghai.

== Research and entrepreneurship ==
Over the last 5 years, NEOMA faculty have authored nearly 500 research articles in peer-reviewed publications. NEOMA supports several centers of excellence and research:

- The Future of Work - Leadership; Jobs and working conditions; Organising; and Knowledge. 65+ research projects;
- The World We Want - Developing sustainable practices; Finance for good; Health, well-being, and happiness; Inclusion, equality, and diversity. 80+ research projects;
- The Complexity Advantage - Value chain and operations; Markets, information, and complexity; Social and organizational complexity; Crowds; Problems, solutions, and decision making. 110+ research projects;
- AI, Data Science & Business - Data science & value creation; AI-based competitive advantage & growth; Unintended consequences of AI and data science; Users experience of AI. 50+ research projects.

In 2011, NEOMA created a Startup Lab for students and alumni. Over 225 start-ups have been launched, and over 100 projects are in incubation every year. The Startup Lab consists of 3 incubators, 2 specialised accelerators, and a Coding School to support the creation and development of start-ups.

== Rankings ==
In 2020, it was recently ranked 6th in the French Challenges business schools ranking. and 9th ex-aequo in Le Figaro Business school ranking.

In 2022, the Financial Times ranked its Masters in Management program 32nd in the world. It was ranked 30th in the 2021 Financial Times ranking of Masters in Management programs and 19th in The Economist.

In the 2024 Financial Times global ranking, NEOMA Business School placed 22nd worldwide for its Master in Management programme and 12th in Europe. NEOMA also appears in the QS Business Masters Rankings 2024, where its Master in Marketing ranks 9th in France and 51–60 worldwide.

== Notable alumni ==
The NEOMA Alumni network (Rouen + Reims) brings together and connects nearly 72,000 graduates and future graduates. The merger of the two former schools has helped to develop the fourth most active alumni network among French business schools.

- Robin Leproux, 1983, Gaming espot founder and former President of Paris Saint-Germain Football Club

== Gallery ==
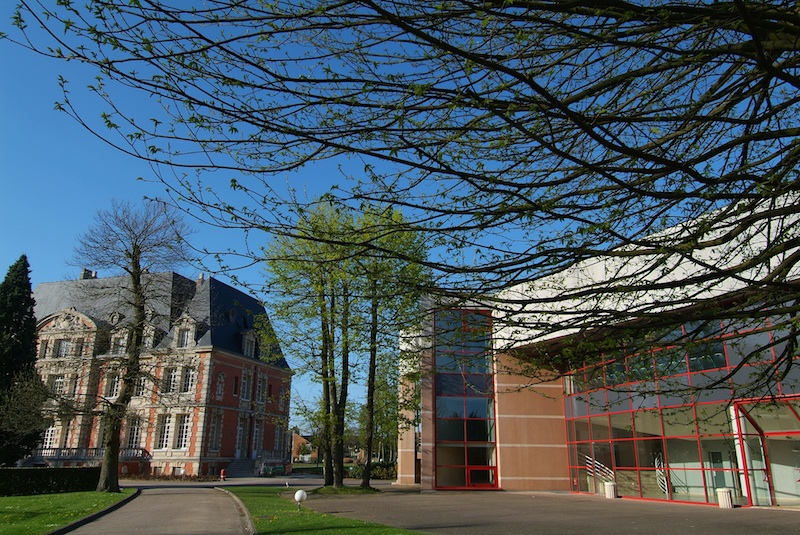
The Rouen Campus possesses a castle.

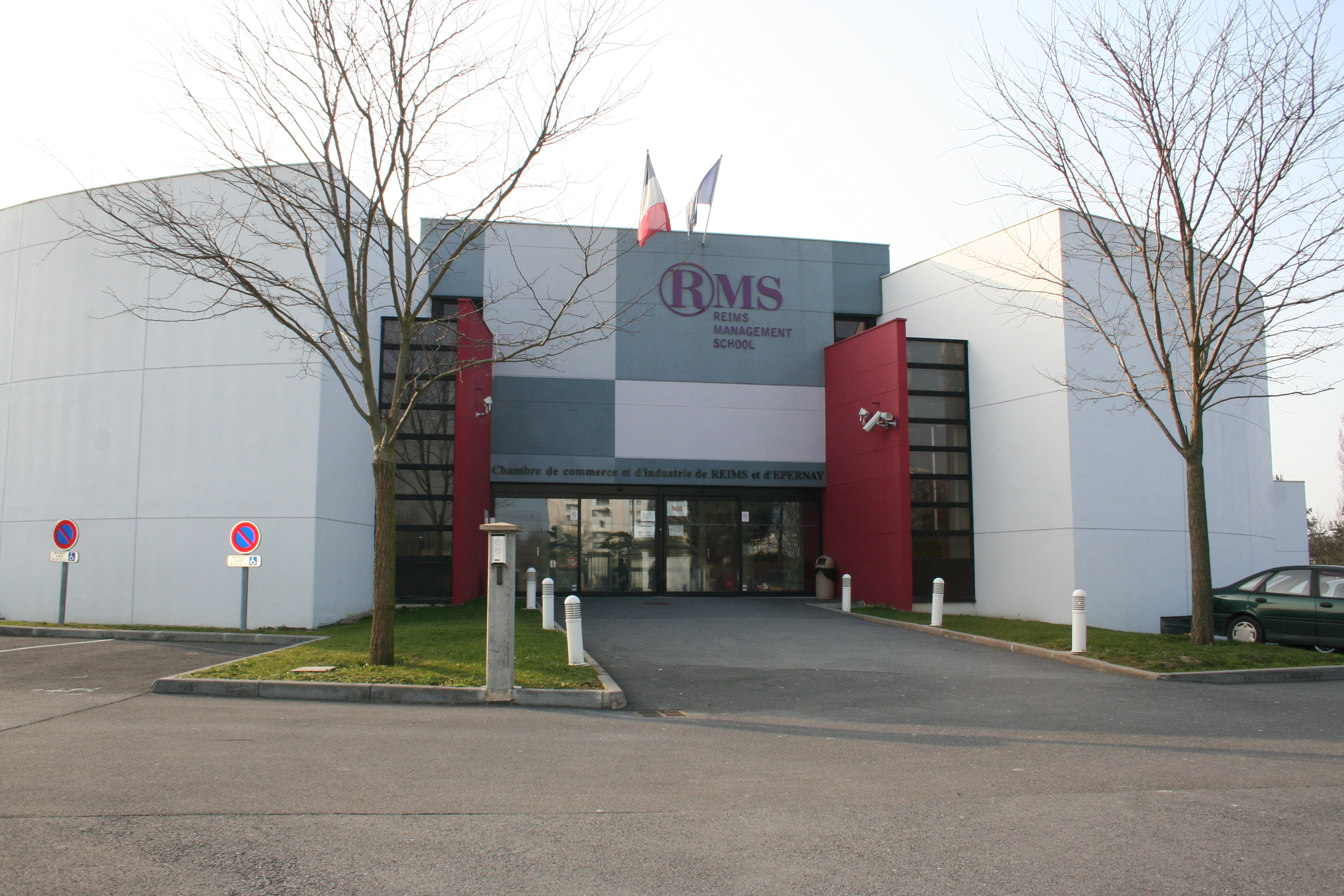
Main building of the Reims Campus.

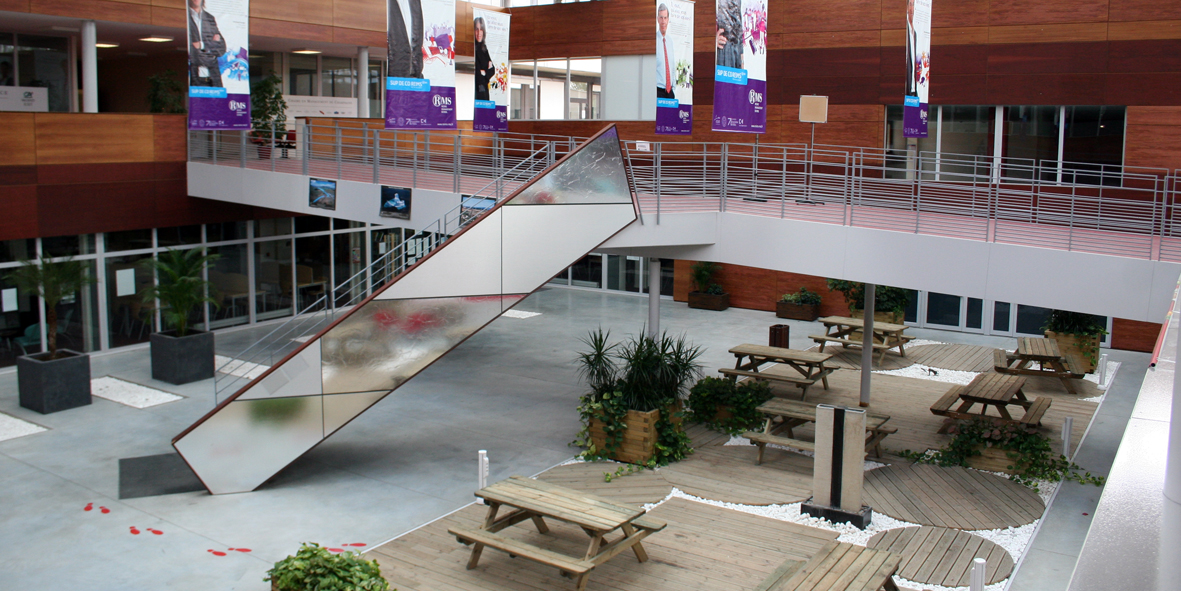
Inside of one of the Reims campus buildings.
