= Centrism in France =

Political history

Centrism in France (French: Centrisme politique) has played a major role in French politics over many decades. This page presents the parties, political movements and personalities linked to Centrism in France according to their political traditions or their background. The different families of centrism are presented in the different sections.

== Moderates, Democrats and Christian Democrats ==
=== History ===
The moderates, democrats and Christian democrats constitute the main political family of the center in France, they come from the Orleanist and liberal traditions of the French right, the moderates, democrats and Christian democrats were mainly structured into political parties after the Liberation of France. The Popular Republican Movement (MRP), under the French Fourth Republic, then the Union for French Democracy (UDF), under the French Fifth Republic constituted the two major political forces which brought the ideologies together. The Fifth Republic and the election by direct universal suffrage of the President of the Republic was established in 1962 would make the electoral success of centrist parties more difficult.

The MRP, founded as a party in 1944 by former resistance fighters, quickly became one of the three major parties (with the PCF and the SFIO) who dominated the national political life of the Fourth Republic. The MRP was the second largest party in the Constituent Assembly of 1945 and that the National Assembly elected in November 1946. The MRP was the largest party during the election of the second Constituent Assembly in June 1946 and was part of the two main coalitions of the Fourth Republic: Tripartisme (1946–47) and the Third Force (1947–51). The MRP then became a central political force of the new regime and counted among its ranks three Prime Ministers: Robert Schuman, Georges Bidault et Pierre Pflimlin. The Christian Democrats participated in all the governments of the Fourth Republic and, despite the political instability of their party, their ministers remained in place for many years with Schuman at the Ministry of Foreign Affairs (1948–1953), Jean-Marie Louvel at the Ministry of Industry and Commerce (1950–1954). However, the MRP fell back electorally: its vote share was halved during the legislative elections of 1951 and 1956. After the founding of the RPF, the MRP no longer appeared as the party of loyalty to Charles de Gaulle, while the traditional moderate right regrouped around the National Centre of Independents and Peasants (CNI). The MRP supported the return of De Gaulle and the establishment of the Fifth Republic and participated in the beginning of his presidency but disagreements over European politics pushed the MPR into opposition before dissolving in 1965. Jean Lecanuet was inspired to found a new party, the Democratic Centre. The Union for French democracy (UDF) was established in 1978 as a union between a number of centrist parties, including the Democratic Centre (from the MRP), the Republican Party (formerly FNRI) and the Radical Party. Other centrist factions, like the Social Democratic Party (PSD) and the Democratic Convention (PSD) succeeded in establishing itself as a political force of government thanks to the legitimacy of its founder, Valéry Giscard d'Estaing, who was elected President of France in 1974, the first time that the role hadn't been held by a Gaullist or a left winger. However, after the failure of Giscard to be re-elected in the 1981 presidential election, the UDF could only maintain its political influence by allying with right-wing forces, disputing the neo-Gaullist Rally for the Republic for leadership over the conservative electorate. Despite this conflict part of the UDF, mainly members of the Centre of Social Democrats (formerly the Democratic Centre of Jean Lecanuet) nevertheless took part in the government of openness led by Michel Rocard from 1988 to 1991, forming a distinct group (Union of the Centre) of the UDF in the National Assembly. From the mid-1990s onwards, the UDF experienced several splits, seeing the Liberals leave it in 1998 (including the Republican Party, which later became Liberal Democracy), then a majority of its executives and many activists in favour of the Union for a Popular Movement (UMP) in 2002 (including the Radical Party). At the same time, the "New-UDF" was created through the merging of most of the remaining components apart from the PPDF.

Logo of MoDem.

In 2007, François Bayrou, president of the UDF, reached 18.57% of the votes in the first round of the presidential election. The UDF finally disappeared through its integration into the new party founded by François Bayrou, the Democratic Movement (MoDem), which adopted a position independent of the right and left forces. Party members that refused to abandon the alliance with the right created The Centrists at the same time. In June 2008, Jean Arthuis, who left the MoDem, created a national association, the Centrist Alliance, which brought together elected officials and activists attached to the political heritage of the UDF.

In 2011, Jean-Louis Borloo president of the Radical Party, created the Republican, Ecologist and Social Alliance (ARES) which aimed to bring together the centrist groups that were members of Nicolas Sarkozy's presidential majority, with the prospect of a common candidacy in the 2012 presidential election. In November 2011, Jean-Louis Borloo decided not to run in the election as a candidate. The members of ARES mainly supported the candidacy of Nicolas Sarkozy after Hervé Morin also did not stand.

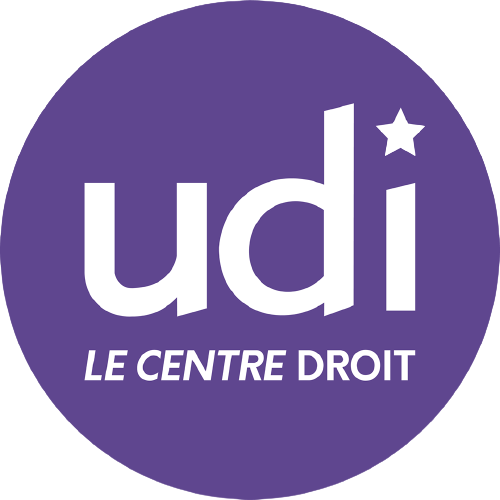
Logo of UDI.

In May 2012 Jean-Louis Borloo created the Union of Democrats and Independents (UDI) following the failure of Nicolas Sarkozy to win re-election. He relaunched his intention to bring together center-right political groups under one movement. Under its influence, Members of Parliament who were members of The Centrists, the Radical Party, and the Centrist Alliance (formerly Rassembler les centrists), and various right and center right (including Caledonia Together and the CNIP) form the Union group democrats and independents in the National Assembly, the UDI became a political party in September 2012 joined by the Democratic European Force (FED) under the leadership of Jean-Christophe Lagarde, which was founded by several members of the New Centre who opposed Hervé Morin's leadership.

In March 2017, the Centrist Alliance provided its support to Emmanuel Macron's En Marche campaign in the 2017 French presidential election, which led to its exclusion from the UDI as the party and its affiliates supported the candidacy of François Fillon (after having supported Alain Juppé during the primary). After the 2017 French legislative election, two other founding parties left the UDI: the Radical Party, which initiated a process of reunification with the left radicals, which led to the founding of the Radical Movement in December 2017. This was followed by Hervé's movement The Centrists.

Following the presidential election and legislative elections, radical centrism was considered France's dominant political ideology.

=== List of parties and movements ===
Party	Years of creation/dissolution	Founder	Other notable leaders	Notes
Democratic Republican Alliance	1901–1940	Adolphe Carnot	Charles Jonnart, Pierre-Étienne Flandin	Radical left; Left-wing Republicans
Popular Liberal Action	1901–1927	Jacques Piou and Albert de Mun		A center-right political force dominating the French right at the beginning of the 20th century, the group almost completely disappeared in 1919.
Popular Democratic Party	1923–1942	Georges Thibout	Auguste Champetier de Ribes	Civic Action Office
Popular Republican Movement	1944–1967	Georges Bidault	Maurice Schumann, Pierre-Henri Teitgen, Pierre Pflimlin, André Colin, Jean Lecanuet	Inspired by French social Catholicism
Democratic Centre	1966–1976	Jean Lecanuet		Became the Centre of Social Democrats in 1976.
Democratic Convention (Popular Party for French Democracy from 1995 to 2002)	1966	Jean-Pierre Fourcade (founder of the first club)	Louis Giscard d'Estaing Éric Hélard	The Perspectives and Realities Clubs brought together moderate liberals supporting Valéry Giscard d'Estaing. In 1978, they participated in the founding of the Union for French Democracy. In 1995, they took the form of the Popular Party for French Democracy under the leadership of Hervé de Charette, a party which joined the UMP in 2002. The Democratic Convention took the form of a political party to integrate the Republican Alliance, ecological and social in May 2011. After being put on hold, it was relaunched in 2014 by Yves Jégo in the form of a political club associated with the Union of Democrats and Independents.
Centre Democracy and Progress	1969–1976	René Pleven, Jacques Duhamel		Became the Centre of Social Democrats in 1976.
Centre of Social Democrats	1976–1995	Jean Lecanuet		Founding party of the Union for French Democracy in 1978 and of Democratic Force in 1995.
Union for French Democracy	1978–2007	Jean Lecanuet, Valéry Giscard d'Estaing	François Léotard and François Bayrou	Founding party of MoDem in 2007 (without real activity since, its definitive disappearance being set for 2010).
Democratic Force	1995–1998	François Bayrou		Merged in 1998 with the PRIL and direct members of the UDF within "the new UDF".
The Alliance	2011–2012	Jean-Louis Borloo		Founded in June 2011 with the aim of supporting a common candidacy for the 2012 French presidential election, this structure brings together the Radical Party, the New Center, the Democratic Convention and the Modern Left. It has been without public activity since Jean-Louis Borloo renounced his candidacy in November 2011.
Les Centristes (Nouveau Centre until 2016)	2007	Hervé Morin		Associated with Fetia Api; member of the Union of Democrats and Independents from 2012 to 2017
Democratic Movement (MoDem)	2007	François Bayrou		Broke away from the UDF; Part of the Together coalition (created in 2021).
Centrist Alliance	2009	Jean Arthuis	Philippe Folliot	Founded in June 2008 in the form of the Centrist Alliance, which transformed into a political party on 27 June 2009. Member of the Union of Democrats and Independents from 2012 to 2017, the party has been affiliated with LREM since 2017.
Democratic European Force	2012	Jean-Christophe Lagarde		Founded in July 2012 by former members of the Nouveau Center and the Democratic Movement. Component of the Union of Democrats and Independents (UDI).
Union des démocrates et indépendants	2012	Jean-Louis Borloo	Jean-Christophe Lagarde	Founded on 18 September 2012 composed of eight national political groups which maintain their existence: Components : FED, Parti radical (2012–2017), LC (2012–2017), AC (2012–2017), NED (2013–2019) Movements associated : CPPR, Calédonie ensemble, La Gauche moderne, Canal écologiste républicain, GayLib (2013–2018), Tapura Huiraatira (2016–2019)
Front démocrate	2014–2017	Jean-Luc Bennahmias		Dissolved into Union des démocrates et des écologistes
Résistons	2016	Jean Lassalle		Agrarian and regionalist movement.

=== French centrist personalities ===
- Raymond Barre
- Simone Veil
- Pierre Méhaignerie
- Philippe Douste-Blazy
- André Santini
- Jean-Pierre Raffarin
- Hervé de Charette
- Gilles de Robien
- Jean-Marie Cavada
- François Sauvadet
- Michel Mercier
- Marielle de Sarnez

== Liberals ==
Liberalism in France can be considered a right-wing ideology but many centrist movements have claimed to be liberal or have had liberal wings like the UDF.

=== History ===
Liberalism has never been a very popular political movement in France since the 20th century. This was partly due to the fact that liberals took quite a long time to organize themselves in the aftermath of the Second World War.

Even within the National Centre of Independents and Peasants (CNIP), it wasn't until the personalities of Antoine Pinay and Valéry Giscard d'Estaing to gain political stature for the liberals to find national leaders in France.

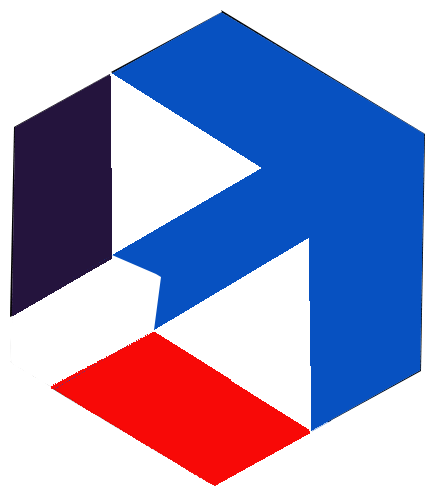
Logo of the Republican Party

During the 1960s, the CNIP experienced a split led by Valéry Giscard d'Estaing bringing together supporters of support for Charles de Gaulle within the Independent Republicans. This parliamentary group would quickly transform into a Giscardian political party which embodied the liberal movement until the creation of the UMP. However, this party would never be able to win the elections (legislative or presidential) alone. Suffering from opposition from the Gaullists after the resignation of Jacques Chirac from his post as Prime Minister in 1976, Valéry Giscard d'Estaing quickly allied himself with the centrist parties, resulting from the breakup of the MRP, which it brought together during the 1978 French legislative election within the UDF whose two main components become the Republican Party (PR – heir to the Independent Republicans) and the Centre of Social Democrats (CDS heir to the MPR). The PR would become a strong political force and be an important component of all right-wing majorities until 1997, but its liberal identity became somewhat blurred due to the essentially democratic image of the UDF. In 1997, it changed its name to Liberal Democracy after Alain Madelin became its president. More than symbolic, this new name embodies a change in attitude among liberals who assume for the first time the ideological identity of their political family. In 1998, the UDF broke up and DL became independent, and became an ally of the RPR with which it merged into the UMP in 2002. This anchored the liberals definitively on the right wing, a position widely accepted by most of them since the 1980s–1990s. However, other political parties continue to want to structure an independent liberal political family, beyond the right-left divide, such as Liberal Alternative or the Liberal Democratic Party (former member of the UDI).

Logo of Horizons

In 2017, some of the members of The Republicans (successor party to the UMP), considered the party line as too right-wing and created the Agir party stating to defend "liberal, social, European, humanist and reformist" ideas. Along the same lines, the Horizons party was created in 2021 .

=== List of liberal parties and movements ===
Party	Years of creation/dissolution	Founder	Other notable leaders	Supplements
Républicains indépendants	1962–1977	Valéry Giscard d'Estaing	Valéry Giscard d'Estaing	Scission du Centre national des indépendants et paysans mené pas Valéry Giscard d'Estaing.
Parti républicain	1977–1997	Valéry Giscard d'Estaing		Parti héritier des Républicains indépendants au sein de l'UDF.
Parti libéral	1980–1986	Serge Dassault		Scission du CNIP en 1980, l'Union des libéraux indépendants devient le PL en 1981. Son fondateur adhère en 1986 au RPR.
Démocratie libérale	1997–2002	Alain Madelin		Nouveau nom de parti républicain. Quitte l'UDF en 1998 pour s'allier avec le RPR puis pour fusionner avec lui pour former l'UMP en 2002
Union pour la démocratie française	1978–2007	Jean Lecanuet, Valéry Giscard d'Estaing	François Léotard, François Bayrou	Pour son aile libérale représentée par le Parti républicain puis par Démocratie libérale.
Union pour un mouvement populaire	2002–2015	Jacques Chirac et Alain Juppé		Le parti unit les libéraux de droite et du centre en 2002. Cependant le parti s'oriente plus vers la droite.
Alternative libérale	2006–2011	Frédéric de Harven	Louis-Marie Bachelot	Il devient en 2011 un club politique associé au Nouveau Centre.
Parti libéral démocrate	2008–2019	Aurélien Véron		Scission d'Alternative libérale membre de l'UDI en 2013. En 2019, le PLD est dissous à l'occasion de sa fusion avec Objectif France.
Agir	2017	Franck Riester		Dans une attitude d’abord « constructive » avec la majorité présidentielle d’Emmanuel Macron, il l’a rejoint de en 2018 avec l’entrée de Riester au gouvernement. Fait partie du collectif Ensemble citoyens.
Horizons	2021	Édouard Philippe		Parti s’inscrivant au sein de la majorité présidentielle d’Emmanuel Macron, rassemblant l’aile droite de celle-ci, autour de l’ancien Premier ministre Édouard Philippe. Fait partie du collectif Ensemble citoyens.

=== French Liberals ===
- Antoine Pinay
- Patrick Devedjian
- Virginie Calmels
- Valéry Giscard d'Estaing
- François Léotard
- Patrick Devedjian
- Alain Madelin

== Radicals ==
=== History ===
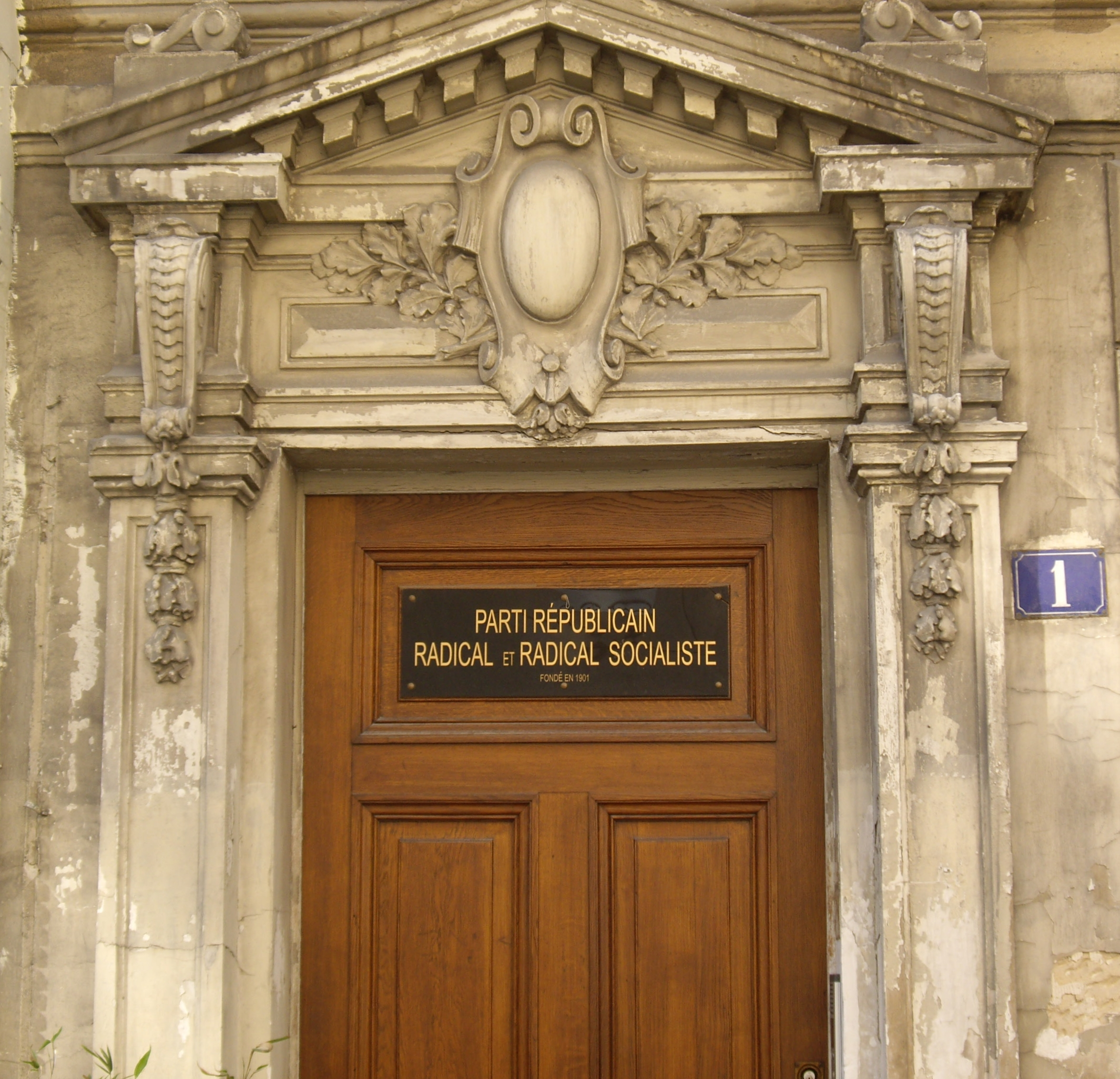
Plaque on the door of the headquarters of the Radical Party.

Radicalism is one of the oldest political families that has been structured in France. As supporters of a secular and social republic, they come from the extreme left of the 19th century.

The Radical Party was founded in 1901, even before the law authorizing the creation of associations and political parties existeed. The Republican Party containing radical and radical-socialists gradually evolved towards a central positioning on the political scene. This is most certainly due to its role as a pivotal party under the French Third Republic, and to the structuring of two competing families on the left: the socialists and the communists. Under the French Fifth Republic, the party lost most of its electoral influence and brought together politicians attached to radical values, but for some advocating an alliance with other left-wing forces and for others who wanted an alliance with centrists from the MRP and the Independent Republicans of Giscard d'Estaing.

Finally, in 1971, the party experienced a split, seeing the creation by the minority tendency of the Radical Party of the Left. In 1978, the so-called "Valoisien" Radical Party joined the Union for French Democracy within which it nevertheless retained a strong degree of autonomy. Finally, in 2002, the party left the UDF to join forces with the UMP, which it left in 2011 when its president, Jean-Louis Borloo, formed the Republican, Ecologist and Social Alliance (ARES) which aims to bring together the centrist groups that are members of Nicolas Sarkozy's presidential majority, with the prospect of a joint candidacy for the 2012 presidential election. Finally Jean-Louis Borloo formed the Union of Democrats and Independents (UDI) in 2012 with the same ambition of bringing together the centrists. The MRG, which became the Radical Left Party, concluded from its creation a lasting programmatic, electoral and financial alliance with the Socialist Party while retaining its legal independence.

=== List of radical parties and movements ===
Party	Year of creation/dissolution	Founder(s)	Other notable leaders	Supplements
**Radical Party**	1901	Léon Gambetta (1863), Jean-Jacques Servan-Schreiber (1971)	Laurent Hénart	Parti fondateur et membre de l'UDF (1978–2002) puis parti associé à l'UMP de 2002 à 2011, membre de l'UDI entre 2012 et 2017. Il fonde le Mouvement radical en 2017 avec le PRG et est mis en sommeil. Le parti est réactivé en 2021 et devient membre du collectif Ensemble citoyens soutenant l’action d’Emmanuel Macron.
Radicaux indépendants	1928–1958			Les radicaux indépendants, principalement alliés aux forces politiques de droite, n'étaient pas structurés en un véritable parti politique.
**Parti radical de gauche**	1972	Maurice Faure, Robert Fabre	Guillaume Lacroix	Scission du Parti radical (aile gauche), Mouvement des radicaux de gauche (MRG) de 1973 à 1994, il devient allié du Parti socialiste. De 2017 à 2019, le PRG fait partie du Mouvement radical, qu’il quitte avant d’être dissout en son sein. Redevenu indépendant, il n’envisage des alliances qu’avec des partis de gauche.
Parti démocrate français	1982–1988 (1978 pour FDR)	Guy Gennesseaux		Scission de l'aile libérale du MRG opérée par des proches de Robert Fabre en 1978 sous la forme de la Fédération pour une démocratie radicale (FDR), qui intégrera le Parti radical (1979) avant de le quitter (1981) pour fonder en 1982 un parti indépendant (PDF). Le parti s'alliera avec le Parti libéral (1985) puis deviendra un mouvement associé au Parti républicain, puis du RPR avant d'être mis en sommeil à partir de 1988.
Union des républicains radicaux	2002–2008	Emmanuel Dupuy	align="center"	Issue des radicaux ayant soutenus Jean-Pierre Chevènement en 2002, l'U2R soutint François Bayrou en 2007 avant de se rapprocher des Progressistes pour intégrer finalement La Gauche moderne, puis Les Centristes.
Mouvement radical	2017–2021	Sylvia Pinel et Laurent Hénart		Issu de la fusion du PRG et du PRV en 2017. En 2019, le PRG quitte le MR. En 2021, le Mouvement radical est dissous au sein du Parti radical, qui est réactivé.
**Les Radicaux de gauche**	2017	Virginie Rozière et Stéphane Saint-André		Scission du PRG, rassemblant les membres opposés à la création du MR.

In bold, parties still active.

=== List of radical politicians ===
- Jean-Jacques Servan-Schreiber
- Maurice Faure
- Robert Fabre
- Jean Médecin
- Jean-Louis Borloo
- Jean-Michel Baylet
- Roger-Gérard Schwartzenberg
- François Huwart
- André Rossinot
- François Loos
- Serge Lepeltier
- Rama Yade
- Yves Jégo
- Annick Girardin

== Social democrats, social liberals and progressives ==
=== History ===
Beyond the radicals, the center-left brings together in France two major currents from moderate socialism: the social democrats and the social liberals.

==== Social democrats ====
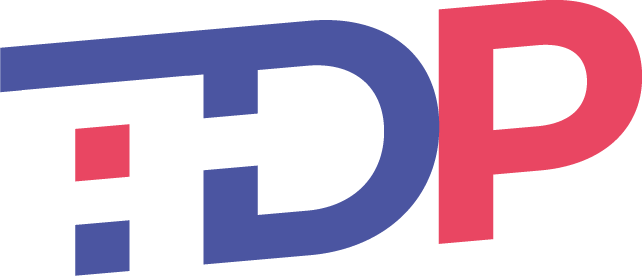
Logo of Territories of Progress.

French social democracy was mainly expressed within the Socialist Party, of which several members claimed to be such during the 2000s. However, they did not claim a centrist position on the political spectrum, but on the contrary an anchoring on the left which remained very majority and embodied in particular by politicians like Dominique Strauss-Kahn. Christian socialists, who were first structured in the trade union sector (French Confederation of Christian Workers) and youth organizations (Jeunesse Étudiante Chrétienne), some participated in the MRP, then in the Socialist Party, like Jacques Delors. Many Protestant socialist figures (or those from Protestant families), such as Michel Rocard, embodied within the "Deuxième gauche" a socialism closer to the forces of the center than to the communist left. In 2020, Territoires of Progress was created, a party claiming to be social democratic and part of Emmanuel Macron's presidential majority .

==== Social liberals ====
Logo of Renaissance.

A more recent trend, the social liberals come from the social democratic tradition. They gradually structured themselves within the Socialist Party (while remaining an extremely minority) claiming a political line inspired by social democracy and the New Labour project embodied by British prime Minister Tony Blair. Gérard Collomb was a figure of this movement in France. Some took the chance and backed liberal candidate Nicolas Sarkozy in 2007 like Jean-Marie Bockel or Éric Besson. Today, social liberalism is mainly expressed within Renaissance (formerly En Marche) although the movement does not claim to be one and prefers to use the term progressive. As the party founded by Emmanuel Macron, a former minister of the socialist government under François Hollande he has support from figures from the center, right and left.

==== Progressives ====
Even more than the homonymous party of Éric Besson, Renaissance claims a progressive identity which is focused on ecology, social liberalism and Pro-Europeanism which goes beyond any economic considerations. The "progressive" terminology does not refer to this movement, unlike social-liberalism. Progressivism is also defended in France by parties or personalities with various economic positions, ranging from the former liberal minister Nathalie Kosciusko-Morizet to the social-democratic movement Place Publique.

=== List of social democrats, social liberals and progressives movements ===
Party	Year of creation / dissolution	Founder(s)	Other notable leaders	Supplements
Le Sillon	1902–1910	Marc Sangnier		"Renaît" en 1912 sous la forme de la Ligue de la jeune république.
Ligue de la jeune République	1912–1957	Marc Sangnier		Fondateur de l'Union de la gauche socialiste en 1957.
Union démocratique et socialiste de la Résistance	1945–1964	François Mitterrand, René Pleven		Se dissout dans la Convention des institutions républicaines en 1964–1965.
Union de la gauche socialiste	1957–1960			Fondateur du Parti socialiste unifié en 1960.
Convention des institutions républicaines	1964–1971	François Mitterrand		Fondateur du Parti socialiste au congrès d'Épinay en 1971.
Objectif socialiste	1965–1971	Robert Buron		Issus notamment du MRP, ses membres intègrent le Parti socialiste au congrès d'Épinay de 1971. La motion qu'ils y présenteront recueillera 0.5% des suffrages.
Parti de la démocratie socialiste	1970–1973	Émile Muller		Fondateur du Mouvement démocrate-socialiste (devenu par la suite le Parti social-démocrate)
**Parti socialiste**	1969	François Mitterrand (1971)	Olivier Faure	Courant Socialisme et démocratie qui rassemble les sociaux-démocrates du PS.
Parti social-démocrate	1973–1995	Max Lejeune, Émile Muller	André Santini	Fondateur de l'UDF en 1978 et de Force démocrate en 1995.
Initiative européenne et sociale	2006–?	Marc d'Héré		Fondée par d'anciens membres du PS, IES s'est alliée au Nouveau Centre aux élections législatives de 2007. Son président est devenu secrétaire général des Progressistes en septembre 2007.
La Gauche moderne	2007–2017 (inactif)	Jean-Marie Bockel		Composante de l’UDI.Parti inactif depuis juillet 2017.
Les Progressistes	2007–2017 (inactif)	Éric Besson		
**Mouvement des progressistes** (Mouvement unitaire progressiste jusqu'en 2014)	2009	Robert Hue	François Béchieau	Scission du Parti communiste français, il s’oriente progressivement vers le centre jusqu’à soutenir et intégrer la majorité présidentielle d’Emmanuel Macron de 2017 à 2018. Il se réoriente néanmoins à gauche à partir de 2018 et fait partie du pôle écologiste depuis 2021.
**La République en marche**	2016	Emmanuel Macron	Stanislas Guerini	Fondé en mai 2016 dans le but d'appuyer la candidature d'Emmanuel Macron pour l'élection présidentielle de 2017. Devenu le parti présidentiel et majoritaire à l'Assemblée nationale depuis l'élection de son fondateur en mai 2017, il s'appuie sur des personnalités venant de la gauche et de la droite. Fait partie du collectif Ensemble citoyens.
**Place Publique**	2018	Raphaël Glucksmann, Thomas Porcher, Claire Nouvian, Jo Spiegel	Mathilde Maulat	Le parti se projette résolument vers les autres composantes de gauche, plutôt que vers La République en marche, malgré un positionnement au centre-gauche.
**Territoires de progrès**	2020	Jean-Yves Le Drian, Olivier Dussopt		Le parti souhaite incarnée l’aile gauche de la majorité présidentielle d’Emmanuel Macron. Fait partie du collectif Ensemble citoyens.

In bold, parties still active.

=== Other personalities ===
- Pierre Mendès France
- Jacques Delors
- Michel Rocard
- Olivier Stirn
- Dominique Strauss-Kahn
- Gérard Collomb
- Manuel Valls
- Pascal Lamy
- Bernard Kouchner
- Nathalie Kosciusko-Morizet
- Emmanuel Macron
- Manuel Valls

== Bonapartists and Social Gaullists ==
=== History ===
Bonapartism, as identified by René Rémond, was one of the three rights existing in France (Les Droites en France, 1954) and of which Gaullism is a direct heir, has also largely inspired the center and the center-left, by its transpartisan aspect and its social doctrine. A part of the social Gaullists and the left Gaullists thus embody, under the French Fifth Republic, the centrist and center-left branch of French Caesarism.

Unlike the social Gaullists, who have always been members of the right-wing Gaullist parties, the left-wing Gaullists were structured independently, notably within the UDT, until the 1980s. From this turning point, they rallied either to the neo-Gaullism of the RPR, or to the traditional left by rapprochement with the PS during the alternation of 1981, joining the presidential majority without however organizing themselves in a common structure.

The Republican Pole of Jean-Pierre Chevènement can nevertheless be considered as a partisan survival of left-wing Gaullism, at the turn of the 2000s. It was succeeded, after the failure of its founder in the 2002 presidential election, by the Deuxième gauche, which still brings together a part of the Republicans, Gaullists and left-wing sovereigntists but whose political audience is more confidential.

Subsequently, the Solidarity Republic party, founded by former Prime Minister Dominique de Villepin in 2010, wants to embody a social Gaullism anchored to the center-right.

=== List of movements ===
Party	Year of creation / dissolution	Founder(s)	Other notable leaders	Supplements
Union démocratique du travail (Deuxième gauche)	1959–1967	Louis Vallon, René Capitant, Jacques Debû-Bridel		Le parti réunit les soutiens de gauche du Général de Gaulle, plus progressistes sur les questions économiques et sociales que la frange majoritaire du gaullisme.
Mouvement des démocrates (Deuxième gauche)	1974–1984	Michel Jobert		Proche du PS de François Mitterrand.
Deuxième gauche	1993–2003 2018	Jean-Pierre Chevènement	Jean-Marie Alexandre	Membre du Pôle républicain. Refondé en 2018 à la suite du rapprochement de la direction du MRC avec La France Insoumise.
Action pour le renouveau du gaullisme et de ses objectifs sociaux (ARGOS)	1998–2007	Jean Charbonnel		Fusionne avec l’UGFR en 2008 dans la Convention des gaullistes sociaux pour la Ve République.
Mouvement républicain et citoyen	2003–2018 (pour la frange modérée)	Jean-Pierre Chevènement		Héritier du MDC, il voit le départ en la frange modérée, sociale-démocrate et centre-gauche lors de son union avec l’APRÉS au sein de la Gauche républicaine et socialiste.
Union gaulliste pour une France républicaine (UGFR)	2003–2008	Jérôme Baloge, Isabelle Gadois, Diane Le Béguec, Laurent Pelvey, Aurélie Tardieu		Fusionne avec l'ARGOS en 2008 dans la Convention des gaullistes sociaux pour la Ve République.
Convention des gaullistes sociaux pour la Ve République	2008–2014 (inactif)	Jean Charbonnel, Jérôme Baloge		Fusion de l'ARGOS et de l’UGFR.
République solidaire	2010–2012 (inactif)	Dominique de Villepin		

In bold, parties still active.

== Centrist ecology ==
=== History ===
From the beginnings of environmental movements, political ecology has been divided into two currents of thought, the first claiming to be left-wing, the second claiming to be independent of the right/left divide or even like centrist movements: this is ecology centrist. The main French environmentalist political party, the Greens, initially adhered to this second school of thought until 1994 when they chose to break with "neither right nor left" to ally themselves with the Socialist Party and then to enter the government of Plural left in 1997. This change of political line caused the departure of Antoine Waechter in 1994 who left to found the Independent Ecological Movement: it was then the beginning of the division between the centrist ecologists and the left ecologists who would impose themselves with The Greens then with The Ecologists as the first political ecological force in France.

In 2015, a new split tore the ecologists of EELV between supporters of a return to the government of Manuel Valls, they were rather center-left ecologists led by Jean-Vincent Placé and François de Rugy, and ecologists favorable to alliances electoral with the Left Front, they are rather left-wing or even radical left ecologists, led by Cécile Duflot.

Jean-Vincent Placé and François de Rugy then founded the Ecologist Party, which allied itself with the Socialist Party and returned to the presidential majority. The movement therefore moved towards La République en marche and joined the new presidential majority formed in 2017.

=== List of ecologist movements ===
Party	Year of creation / dissolution	Founder(s)	Other notable leaders	Supplements
Les Verts	1984–1994 (pour la frange centriste)	–	Dominique Voynet; Gilles Lemaire; Yann Wehrling; Cécile Duflot	
Génération écologie	1991	Brice Lalonde; Jean-Louis Borloo; Yves Piétrasanta; Noël Mamère; Corinne Lepage	Delphine Batho	Dans la foulée du mandat ministériel de Brice Lalonde, le mouvement Génération écologie se constitute avec les militants écologistes Il est créé à l'initiative de François Mitterrand pour concurrencer Les Verts avant les élections régionales. Le conseil national de Génération écologie appelle à voter pour Jacques Chirac à l’élection présidentielle de 1995, avant de signer un accord avec Démocratie libérale en 1998. Le mouvement glisse alors vers la droite. À partir de 2011, il s'ancre de nouveau davantage au centre gauche en se rapprochant notamment du PRG puis d’EELV, en rejoignant le pôle écologiste en 2021.
Mouvement écologiste indépendant	1994	Antoine Waechter		Scission des Verts créé à l'initiative d'Antoine Waechter (également cofondateur des Verts), qui considère l'écologisme comme un projet politique distinct de la droite et de la gauche, mais pouvant s'allier aussi bien avec l'une qu'avec l'autre, à l'opposé des Verts qui considèrent l'écologisme comme un courant de la gauche.
Cap21	2000–2021	Corinne Lepage		Associé au Mouvement démocrate de 2007 à 2010.
Alliance écologiste indépendante	2009–2021	Jean-Marc Governatori; Antoine Waechter; Noël Debroise		Coalition de trois partis écologistes transformée en parti unitaire après le départ de Génération écologie et du Mouvement écologiste indépendant.
Nouvelle Écologie démocrate	2013–2019 (inactif)	Éric Deltaye		Scission de Cap21, composante de l'UDI. En 2019, le parti quitte l’UDI et s’associe au MR. Il est depuis inactif.
Parti écologiste (Écologistes ! jusqu’en 2016)	2015–2017 (inactif)	Jean-Vincent Placé François de Rugy		Scission d'EELV qui dénonce la "dérive gauchiste" du parti. D'abord proche du Parti socialiste et membre de l'UDE (qu'il quitte en 2016), le PE s’affilie à La République en Marche ! en 2017 et est inactif depuis.
Union des démocrates et des écologistes	2015–2020 (inactif)	Jean-Luc Bennahmias; Jean-Vincent Placé; François de Rugy		Fondée par trois partis écologistes, Écologistes !, le Front démocrate et Génération écologie qui envisageaient de s'allier au sein d'une fédération nommée l'Union des démocrates et des écologistes. Finalement Génération écologie annonce qu'il ne rejoint pas l'UDE. Ce départ est suivi par le départ d'Écologistes ! en 2016. Le parti est placé sous administration judiciaire en 2020.
Liberté Écologie Fraternité	2020	Marie-Pierre Bresson		Rassemble l’aile gauche de l’UDE.
En Commun	2020	Barbara Pompili	Philippe Hardouin	Parti s’inscrivant au sein de la majorité présidentielle d’Emmanuel Macron, mais voulant porter une ligne plus à gauche et écologiste que LREM. Fait partie du collectif Ensemble citoyens.
Union des centristes et des écologistes	2021	Christophe Madrolle		Parti créé au départ en soutien à Emmanuel Macron. Parti politique désormais indépendant.
Cap écologie	2021	Corinne Lepage Jean-Marc Governatori		Fusion de Cap21 de Corinne Lepage et de l’Alliance écologiste indépendante de Jean-Marc Governatori.

=== Ecologist politicians ===
- Barbara Pompili
- François de Rugy
- Jean-Luc Bennahmias
- Nicolas Hulot

== Other centrist groups ==
It is also possible to place at the centre of the political spectrum certain "thematic" movements and parties such as the Federalist Party or regionalist-nationalist parties such as the Breton Party.

In the royalist movement, the Democratic Rally (RD) is a small centrist group bringing together the center left and the center right as well as the royalist Gaullists.

== See also ==
- Centrism
- Miscellaneous centre

== Bibliography ==
- Sylvie Guillaume (dir.), Le centrisme en France aux XIXe et XXe siècles : un échec ?, Bordeaux, MSH, 181p, 2005.
- François Roth, Les modérés dans la vie politique française 1870–1965, Nancy, PUN, 585p, 2000.
- Aurelian Craiutu, Le Centre introuvable. La pensée politique des doctrinaires sous la Restauration, Paris, Plon, 2006.
- Jean-Pierre Rioux, Les Centristes: de Mirabeau à Bayrou, Fayard, Paris, 320p, 2011.
- Alexandre Vatimbella, Le Centre et le Centrisme: De la Révolution à Macron, CREC Editions, 170p, 2017.
- Jean-Claude Delbreil, Centrisme et démocratie chrétienne. Le Parti Démocrate Populaire des origines au MRP 1919–1944, Paris, Publications de la Sorbonne, 485p, 1990.
- Rosemonde Sanson, L'Alliance républicaine et démocratique. Une formation du centre (1901–1920), Rennes, PUR, 562p, 2003.

Biographies

- Nadine-Josette Chaline, Jean Lecanuet. Témoignages de François Bayrou et Dominique Baudis, en collaboration, Beauchesne, 2003 ISBN 2701014050;
