= Liberalism and radicalism in France =

Liberalism and radicalism have played a role in the political history of France. The main line of conflict in France in the long nineteenth century was between monarchists (mainly Legitimists and Orléanists but also Bonapartists) and republicans (Radical-Socialists, Opportunist Republicans, and later socialists). The Orléanists, who favoured constitutional monarchy and economic liberalism, were opposed to the Republican Radicals.

The Radical Party and especially the "republican" parties (Democratic Republican Alliance, Republican Federation, National Centre of Independents and Peasants, Independent Republicans, Republican Party, and Liberal Democracy) have since embraced liberalism, including its economic version, and have mostly joined either the Union for a Popular Movement in 2002, later renamed The Republicans in 2015, while a minority are affiliated with the Union of Democrats and Independents, launched in 2012. Emmanuel Macron, a former member of the Socialist Party, launched En Marche! (later re-named Renaissance) in 2016 and has served as President of France since 2017.

== Background and history ==
The early high points of liberalism in France were:

- 1790–1792: when Girondins and Feuillants dominated the early French Revolution;
- 1848: the French Revolution of 1848, which ended the Orléans monarchy (since 1830) and led to the creation of the French Second Republic.

In France, as in much of Southern Europe, the term liberal was used during the 19th century either to refer to the traditional liberal anti-clericalism or economic liberalism. Economic liberalism in France was long associated more with the Orléanists and with Opportunist Republicans (whose heir was the Democratic Republican Alliance), rather than the Radical Party, leading to the use of the term radical to refer to political liberalism. The Radicals tended to be more statist than most European liberals, but shared liberal values on other issues, especially support for individual liberty and secularism, while the Republicans were keener on economic liberalism than secularism.

Intellectuals played a powerful role in all the movements, for example a major spokesman for radicalism was Émile Chartier (1868–1951), who wrote under the pseudonym of "Alain". He was a leading theorist of radicalism, and his influence extended through the Third and Fourth Republics. He stressed individualism, seeking to defend the citizen against the state. He warned against all forms of power – military, clerical, and economic. To oppose them, he exalted the small farmer, the small shopkeeper, the small town, and the little man. He idealized country life and saw Paris as a dangerous font of power.

After World War II, the Republicans gathered in the liberal-conservative National Centre of Independents and Peasants, from which the conservative-liberal Independent Republicans was formed in 1962. The originally centre-left Radical Party was a declining force and joined the centre-right in 1972, causing the split of the left-wing faction and the foundation of the Radical Party of the Left, closely associated to the Socialist Party. The former was later associated with the Union for a Popular Movement.

In 1978 both the Republican Party (successor of the Independent Republicans) and the Radical Party were founding components, along with the Christian-democratic Centre of Social Democrats, of the Union for French Democracy, an alliance of non-Gaullist centre-right forces. The Republican Party, re-founded as Liberal Democracy and re-shaped as an economic liberal party, left the federation in 1998 and was later merged, along with the Radical Party, into the liberal-conservative Union for a Popular Movement (later The Republicans) in 2002. The Radicals and several former Republicans launched the Union of Democrats and Independents in 2012.

In 2016 Emmanuel Macron, a former member of the Socialist Party, launched La République En Marche!, a liberal party, and was elected President of France in the 2017 presidential election. The party formed an alliance with the Democratic Movement, established in 2017 as a successor of the Union for French Democracy, stripped of most former Republicans, who joined the Union for a Popular Movement (later The Republicans) or the Union of Democrats and Independents.

== Timeline of parties ==
=== 19th Century ===
- 1815: The Doctrinaires were formed.
- 1817: Former Feuillants re-united in the Democrats, also known as Liberals.
- 1848: A radical faction forms the Radicals, supporting the Second Republic in opposition to the Orléanists and the Moderate Republicans emerge
- 1870: The Third Republic is formed.
- 1871: The Moderate Republicans split into the Opportunist Republicans, whose official name was Republican Left (GR), and the Republican Union (UR)
- 1885: The GR and the UR are united in the Democratic Union (UD).
- 1889: The Progressive Republicans, whose official name was Liberal Republican Union (ULR), are formed. The remaining Opportunist Republicans formed the National Republican Association (ANR).
- 1894: The Progressive Union (UR) is formed.

=== The Republican tradition ===
- 1901: The centre-right liberal Democratic Republican Alliance (ARD) and the Popular Liberal Action (ALP) are formed.
- 1902: The Progressive Union (UR) is merged into the ARD.
- 1903: The more conservative Republican Federation (FR) is founded and the Liberal Republican Union (ULR) and National Republican Association (ANR) are merged into it.
- 1911: The ARD is renamed Democratic Republican Party (PRD).
- 1917: The ARD goes back to its original name.
- 1919: The ALP is merged into the FR.
- 1920: The ARD is further renamed Social, Democratic and Republican Party (PRDS).
- 1926: The ARD is finally renamed Democratic Alliance (AD).
- 1945: The liberal-conservative Republican Party of Liberty (PRL), successor of the FR, is founded.
- 1948: The liberal-conservative National Centre of Independents and Peasants (CNIP) is founded.
- 1949: The declining AD and the PRL are absorbed by the CNIP.
- 1962: A group of splinters from the CNIP, led by Valéry Giscard d'Estaing, oppose the party's decision to withdraw support to President Charles de Gaulle and, in order to continue to be part of the government, form the Independent Republicans (RI).
- 1974: Giscard d'Estaing is elected President of France in the presidential election.
- 1976: The RI are a founding member of the European Liberal Democrat and Reform Party.
- 1977: The RI are renamed Republican Party (PR).
- 1978: The PR joins forces with the Centre of Social Democrats, the Radical Party and the Social Democratic Party to form the Union for French Democracy (UDF).
- 1995: The Popular Party for French Democracy (PPDF) is formed by supporters of Giscard, including several Republicans, within the UDF.
- 1997: The PR, under the new leader Alain Madelin, is renamed Liberal Democracy (DL).
- 1998: The DL separates from the UDF, but a group of dissidents form the Independent Republican and Liberal Pole (PRIL) in order to remain loyal to the UDF.
- 2002: The DL and the PPDF merge with the Gaullist-conservative Rally for the Republic (RPR) to form the Union for a Popular Movement (UMP). Liberal factions within the new party include The Reformers, the "Liberal Clubs", "Liberal Generation" and the "Free Right", as well as the Radical Party (see below).
- 2007: The UDF is transformed into the Democratic Movement (see below). Dissidents form the New Centre (NC) and the Civic Alliance for Democracy in Europe (ACDE) to continue the alliance with the UMP.
- 2009: Former UDF members formed the Centrist Alliance (AC).
- 2012: The NC, the AC, the ACDE, Modern Left and other minor centre-right or centrist parties form the Union of Democrats and Independents (UDI), which aims at becoming a centrist alternative to the UMP, while being in alliance with it. Democratic European Force splits from the NC.
- 2014: The UDI and the Democratic Movement form a short-lived alliance named The Alternative.
- 2015: The UMP is transformed into The Republicans (LR).
- 2016: The UDI joins the Alliance of Liberals and Democrats for Europe Party. The NC is transformed into The Centrists (LC), which continues to be part of the UDI.
- 2017: A moderate faction of LR forms Agir.
- 2021: Centre-right politicians form Horizons.
- 2021: Agir and Horizons join the ⇒ LREM-led Ensemble Citoyens.

=== The Radical tradition ===
- 1901: The Radicals organise themselves in the Republican, Radical and Radical-Socialist Party (Rad).
- 1926: Dissident Radicals form the Independent Radicals (RI), later Independent Radical Party (PRI).
- 1946: The Radicals, along with the PRI, the Democratic and Socialist Union of the Resistance (UDSR) and minor parties, form the Rally of Left Republicans (RGR).
- 1956: The Radicals and the other components of the RGR join forces with the French Section of the Workers' International (SFIO), however some dissidents transformed the RGR into a full-fledged party and other Radical dissidents from the Republican Centre (CR).
- 1959: The RGR merges into the Gaullist Union for the New Republic (UNR).
- 1961: Pierre Mendès France, a leading Radical and former Prime Minister, joins the Unified Socialist Party (PSU).
- 1972: A left-wing faction forms the Movement of Left Radicals (MRG).
- 1978: The Rad becomes an affiliated member of the centrist UDF.
- 1996: The MRG is renamed Radical-Socialist Party (PRS).
- 1996: The PRS is renamed Radical Party of the Left (PRG).
- 2002: The Rad leaves the UDF and becomes an affiliated member of the Union for a Popular Movement (UMP).
- 2011: The Rad cuts its ties with the UMP and joins The Alliance.
- 2012: The Rad is, along with other parties (see above), a founding member of the Union of Democrats and Independents (UDI).
- 2017: The Rad and the PRG are merged into the Radical Movement (MR).
- 2017: A group of PRG members founded The Radicals of the Left (LRG).
- 2019: A group of former members of the PRG re-form the PRG as an independent party.

=== Classical liberals ===
- 2006: A group of classical liberals establish the Liberal Alternative (AL).
- 2008: A group of dissidents leaves the AL and launches the Liberal Democratic Party (PLD).
- 2012: The PLD joins the Union of Democrats and Independents (UDI).

=== Democratic Movement ===
- 2007: The Democratic Movement (MoDem) is formed by François Bayrou, until then leader of the Union for French Democracy (which has suffered the split of some of its founding components in 1998–2002, see above), on the remnants of the latter party.
- 2014: The MoDem and the Union of Democrats and Independents form a short-lived alliance named The Alternative.
- 2017: The MoDem forms an alliance with La République En Marche! and endorses its leader Emmanuel Macron in the presidential election (see below).

=== La République En Marche! ===
- 2016: Emmanuel Macron, a former member of the Socialist Party, launches La République En Marche! (EM!).
- 2017: Macron is elected President of France in the presidential election.

== Liberal leaders ==
- 19th century: Lafayette, Benjamin Constant, François Guizot, Adolphe Thiers, Jules Grévy, Léon Gambetta
- ARD: Émile Loubet, Armand Fallières, Paul Deschanel, Raymond Poincaré, Louis Barthou, Albert Lebrun, André Tardieu, André Maginot, Pierre-Étienne Flandin
- Rad/MR: Émile Combes, Georges Clemenceau, Gaston Doumergue, Édouard Herriot, Henri Queuille, Édouard Daladier, Camille Chautemps, René Mayer, Gaston Monnerville, Pierre Mendès France, Edgar Faure, Maurice Faure, Jean-Jacques Servan-Schreiber, Jean-Louis Borloo, Laurent Hénart
- CNIP: Paul Reynaud (ex-ARD), René Coty (ex-Rad), Joseph Laniel (ex-ARD), Antoine Pinay (ex-ARD), Roger Duchet
- RI/PR/DL: Raymond Marcellin (ex-CNIP), Michel Poniatowski (ex-CNIP), Valéry Giscard d'Estaing (ex-CNIP), Simone Veil, Jean-Pierre Soisson, Alain Madelin
- MRS/PRS/PRG: Robert Fabre (ex-Rad), Michel Crépeau (ex-Rad), Émile Zuccarelli, Roger-Gérard Schwartzenberg, Jean-Michel Baylet, Sylvia Pinel
- UMP: Jean-Claude Gaudin (ex-PR/DL), Patrick Devedjian, Jean-Pierre Raffarin (ex-PR/DL)
- LREM: Emmanuel Macron (ex-PS), Sylvie Goulard (ex-MoDem)

== Liberal thinkers ==
- Montesquieu (1689–1755)
- Voltaire (1694–1778)
- Jean-Jacques Rousseau (1712–1778)
- Marquis de Condorcet (1743–1794)
- Benjamin Constant (1767–1830)
- Frédéric Bastiat (1801–1850)
- Alexis de Tocqueville (1805–1859)
- Raymond Aron (1905–1983)
- Raymond Boudon (1934–2013)

== See also ==
- History of France
- Politics of France
- List of political parties in France
- Nouveaux Philosophes
- French Republican Left (1871–1885)
