= Union of the Right and Centre =

Electoral label in French politics

Union of the Right and Centre Union de la droite et du centre
- Abbreviation: UDC
- Leader: Vacant
- Founder: Charles de Gaulle
- Founded: 1967
- Political position: Centre-right
- Colours: Blue
- Senate: 165 / 348
- National Assembly: 68 / 577
- European Parliament: 8 / 79
- Presidencies of Regional Councils: 6 / 17
- Presidency of Departmental Councils: 57 / 94

The Union of the Right and Centre (French: Union de la droite et du centre; UDC) is a term used in France to designate an electoral alliance between the parties of the right and of the centre-right.

Throughout the Fifth Republic, the Gaullist party allied itself with smaller right and centre political formations in order to obtain a majority in the National Assembly or for local elections. Between 2002 and 2012, almost all of this movement was united in the Union for a Popular Movement which then defined itself as the "party of the right and of the centre".

The term is subsequently used for the lists and candidacies presented by The Republicans (LR) party and its centrist allies (Union of Democrats and Independents and The Centrists).

With a view to the legislative elections of June 2022, the president of LR Christian Jacob unveiled during a National Congress organized on May 7, 2022, an agreement providing for mutual withdrawals between the three formations, including 457 candidates invested by LR, 59 by the UDI, 26 by LC and one by Liberties and Territories.

== Chronology of the different alliances ==
Alliance	Member parties	Elections
Union of the Republicans of Progress	Union of Democrats for the Republic (UDR)	1967 legislative election 1968 legislative election 1973 legislative election
Union of the Republicans of Progress	Independent Republicans (RI)	1967 legislative election 1968 legislative election 1973 legislative election
Union of the Republicans of Progress	Centre Democracy and Progress (CDP)	1967 legislative election 1968 legislative election 1973 legislative election
Union for the New Majority (1981); Union of the Opposition for Renewal (1984–1986); Union of Rally and Centre (1988); Union UDF-RPR (1989); Union for France (1990–1995)	Rally for the Republic (RPR)	1981 legislative election 1984 European Parliament election 1986 legislative election 1986 regional elections 1988 legislative election 1989 European Parliament election 1992 regional elections 1993 legislative election 1994 European Parliament election
Union for the New Majority (1981); Union of the Opposition for Renewal (1984–1986); Union of Rally and Centre (1988); Union UDF-RPR (1989); Union for France (1990–1995)	Union for French Democracy (UDF) • Republican Party • Centre of Social Democrats • Radical Party • Social Democratic Party	1981 legislative election 1984 European Parliament election 1986 legislative election 1986 regional elections 1988 legislative election 1989 European Parliament election 1992 regional elections 1993 legislative election 1994 European Parliament election
Union for the New Majority (1981); Union of the Opposition for Renewal (1984–1986); Union of Rally and Centre (1988); Union UDF-RPR (1989); Union for France (1990–1995)	National Centre of Independents and Peasants (CNIP)	1981 legislative election 1984 European Parliament election 1986 legislative election 1986 regional elections 1988 legislative election 1989 European Parliament election 1992 regional elections 1993 legislative election 1994 European Parliament election
Union RPR-UDF	Rally for the Republic (RPR)	1997 legislative election 1998 regional elections
Union RPR-UDF	Union for French Democracy (UDF) • Liberal Democracy • Democratic Force • Radical Party • Popular Party for French Democracy	1997 legislative election 1998 regional elections
The Alliance (1998–1999)	Rally for the Republic (RPR)	1999 European Parliament election
The Alliance (1998–1999)	New UDF until February 1999 • Radical Party • Popular Party for French Democracy	1999 European Parliament election
The Alliance (1998–1999)	Liberal Democracy (DL)	1999 European Parliament election
Union for the Presidential Majority	Rally for the Republic (RPR)	2002 legislative election
Union for the Presidential Majority	Liberal Democracy (DL)	2002 legislative election
Union for the Presidential Majority	elected majority from UDF	2002 legislative election
Union for the Presidential Majority	Radical Party (RAD)	2002 legislative election
Union for the Presidential Majority	Popular Party for French Democracy (PPDF)	2002 legislative election
Union for the Presidential Majority	Forum of Social Republicans (FRS)	2002 legislative election
Liaison Committee for the Presidential Majority	Union for a Popular Movement (UMP) • Radical Party • Democratic Convention • Christian Democratic Party • Le Chêne • Les Progressistes	2007 legislative election 2009 European Parliament election 2010 regional elections
Liaison Committee for the Presidential Majority	New Centre (NC)	2007 legislative election 2009 European Parliament election 2010 regional elections
Liaison Committee for the Presidential Majority	Modern Left (LGM)	2007 legislative election 2009 European Parliament election 2010 regional elections
Liaison Committee for the Presidential Majority	Movement for France (MPF) from 2010	2007 legislative election 2009 European Parliament election 2010 regional elections
Liaison Committee for the Presidential Majority	Hunting, Fishing, Nature and Traditions (CPNT) from 2010	2007 legislative election 2009 European Parliament election 2010 regional elections
Union of the Right and Centre	The Republicans (LR)	2015 regional elections 2017 presidential election 2017 legislative election 2019 European Parliament election (without UDI); 2021 regional elections 2022 presidential election
Union of the Right and Centre	Union of Democrats and Independents (UDI) • Democratic European Force • Clubs Perspectives and Realities • Radical Party until 2017 • Centrist Alliance until 2017 • Modern Left inactive since 2017	2015 regional elections 2017 presidential election 2017 legislative election 2019 European Parliament election (without UDI); 2021 regional elections 2022 presidential election
Union of the Right and Centre	The Centrists (LC) member of the UDI until 2017	2015 regional elections 2017 presidential election 2017 legislative election 2019 European Parliament election (without UDI); 2021 regional elections 2022 presidential election
Union of the Right and Centre	Rurality Movement (LMR) until 2021	2015 regional elections 2017 presidential election 2017 legislative election 2019 European Parliament election (without UDI); 2021 regional elections 2022 presidential election
Union of the Right and Centre	Democratic Movement (MoDem) until 2017	2015 regional elections 2017 presidential election 2017 legislative election 2019 European Parliament election (without UDI); 2021 regional elections 2022 presidential election
Union of the Right and Centre	Christian Democratic Party (PCD) until 2019	2015 regional elections 2017 presidential election 2017 legislative election 2019 European Parliament election (without UDI); 2021 regional elections 2022 presidential election
Union of the Right and Centre	The Republicans (LR)	2022 legislative election
Union of the Right and Centre	Union of Democrats and Independents (UDI)	2022 legislative election
Union of the Right and Centre	The Centrists (LC)	2022 legislative election
Union of the Right and Centre	Oser la France	2022 legislative election
Union of the Right and Centre	The Republicans (LR)	2024 French legislative election
Union of the Right and Centre	Nouvelle Énergie (NE)	2024 French legislative election
Union of the Right and Centre	The Republicans (LR)	2027 presidential election
Union of the Right and Centre	Nouvelle Énergie (NE)	2027 presidential election
Union of the Right and Centre	Renaissance (RE)	2027 presidential election
