= Y a-t-il une erreur qu'ils n'ont pas commise? =

- Author: Christian Perronne
- Working title: Y a-t-il une erreur qu'ils n'ont pas commise ?
- Language: French
- Subject: COVID-19 pandemic in France
- Genre: Essay
- Published: 2020
- Publisher: Éditions Albin Michel
- Publication place: France
- Pages: 206
- ISBN: 978-2-226-45518-5
- OCLC: 1162873888

Y a-t-il une erreur qu'ils n'ont pas commise ? : Covid-19 : l'union sacrée de l'incompétence et de l'arrogance (Is there a mistake THEY didn't make?: COVID-19: the sacred union of incompetence and arrogance) is an argumentative and polemical essay by Christian Perronne published in 2020 by Albin Michel. Its content deals with the controversial governmental and scientific issues relating to the management of the COVID-19 pandemic in France.

== Theme ==
In this book, Christian Perronne criticizes the French government's management of the COVID-19 pandemic in France. He denounces a "State lie" regarding the shortages of masks and tests. He castigates the infringement with doctors' freedom to prescribe and what he perceives as an intensive lobbying by pharmaceutical laboratories and “Big Pharma”. He blames the wait-and-see attitude of the French health authorities, in particular the Scientific Council, and he points out the inability of most internal administrative structures to adequately deal with an emergency situation.

== Critical reviews ==
In the daily newspaper Les Échos, Kevin Badeau wrote that the author's point of view “too often falls into excessive severity,” adding that “everything or almost everything is a scandal”. In the journal Financial Afrik, Laurent Mucchielli wrote “if the form of the commentary is sometimes criticizable, the well-argued textual substance reflects a widely shared anger”.

== Media coverage and sales ==
During the week of 22–28 June 2020, the book ranked twelfth in sales in France (it was first in the category “Tests and References”).

== Controversies on the fringes of the book's release ==
During several broadcast interviews and confrontations on television and radio, he attacked various decrees whose promulgation would have contributed to the doctors of the Nantes University Hospital being confronted with no other outcome than “letting his brother-in-law die” due to the impossibility for them to resort to the only drug that, according to him, could have helped to get his relative off the hook if the ban on prescribing Plaquenil had not been pronounced in high places, thus leaving the health care system destitute and “stark naked” in the face of the pandemic. He further states that “France is the only country in the world where doctors have been banned from prescribing chloroquine”. He therefore estimates that the treatment using this medication, if it had not been so arbitrarily banned, could have helped save the lives of 25,000 people. He adds that “there is a real corruption that has led tens of thousands of French people into death”, and that opponents of hydroxychloroquine are “bought and corrupted by the pharmaceutical industry”. These statements outrage many health care providers. Consequently, the Assistance Publique-Hôpitaux de Paris (AP-HP) referred the matter to its ethical authorities. By extension, in a letter dated June 24, 2020, the director general of this body, Martin Hirsch, asked its ethics committee to give an informed opinion “before the end of July” in order to detect or invalidate the existence of possible “breaches of ethical obligations (...) in a situation where statements are made with the authority conferred on a position of responsibility in a public university hospital”. The National Council of the French Medical Association (CNOM) was thus called upon to react and, shortly afterwards, referred the matter to the Departmental Council of the Hauts-de-Seine Medical Association for a decision on possible sanctions.
