= Sabine Herold =

French politician

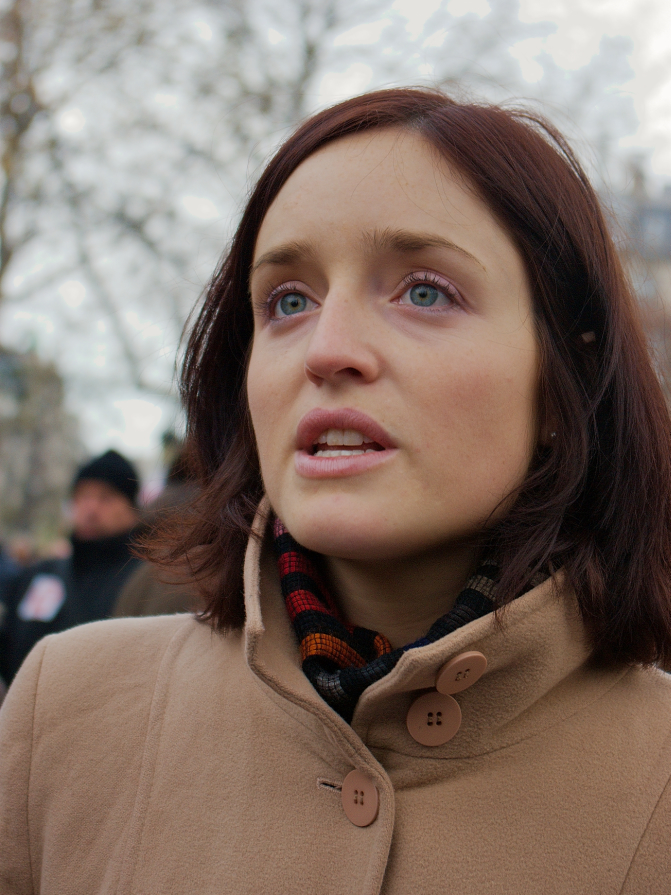
- Sabine Herold in 2007
- Born: 8 July 1981 (age 45); Reims, France
- Education: HEC Paris; Sciences Po
- Occupation: Venture capital
- Known for: Political activism

Sabine Herold (born 8 July 1981) is a French classical liberal activist and main spokeswoman of Alternative libérale, a French liberal/libertarian political party.

== Biography ==
Herold was born in Reims, France. Her parents are both teachers. She is an alumna in public administration from the Institut d'études politiques de Paris and a master of business from HEC Paris. Since 2002, she has been the editor and spokeswoman of Liberté chérie (Beloved Freedom), a French libertarian think tank. Sabine Herold became known in 2003 when she led an 80,000 member protest advocating reforms in France and demanding a responsible attitude from trade unions. Her stand against the unions led to her being described as the 'new Joan of Arc'.

She has often reflected upon the policy implemented by the British Prime Minister Margaret Thatcher and is commonly called "Mademoiselle Thatcher" by newspapers, a comparison that she considers to be a compliment.

She married fellow Alternative libérale leader Édouard Fillias in September 2006. She was a candidate for the 2007 parliamentary elections in Paris against conservative Françoise de Panafieu.

== Books ==
- Liberté, liberté chérie (English: Liberty, Dear Liberty), Sabine Herold and Édouard Fillias, Les Belles Lettres, 2003, ISBN 2-251-44247-2
- Le manifeste des alterlibéraux (English: Manifesto of the Alternative Liberals), Edouard Fillias, Aurélien Véron, Ludovic Lassauce, Jean-Paul Oury and Sabine Hérold
