= Cabinet of François Fillon =

First Fillon Government
- Cabinet of 32nd

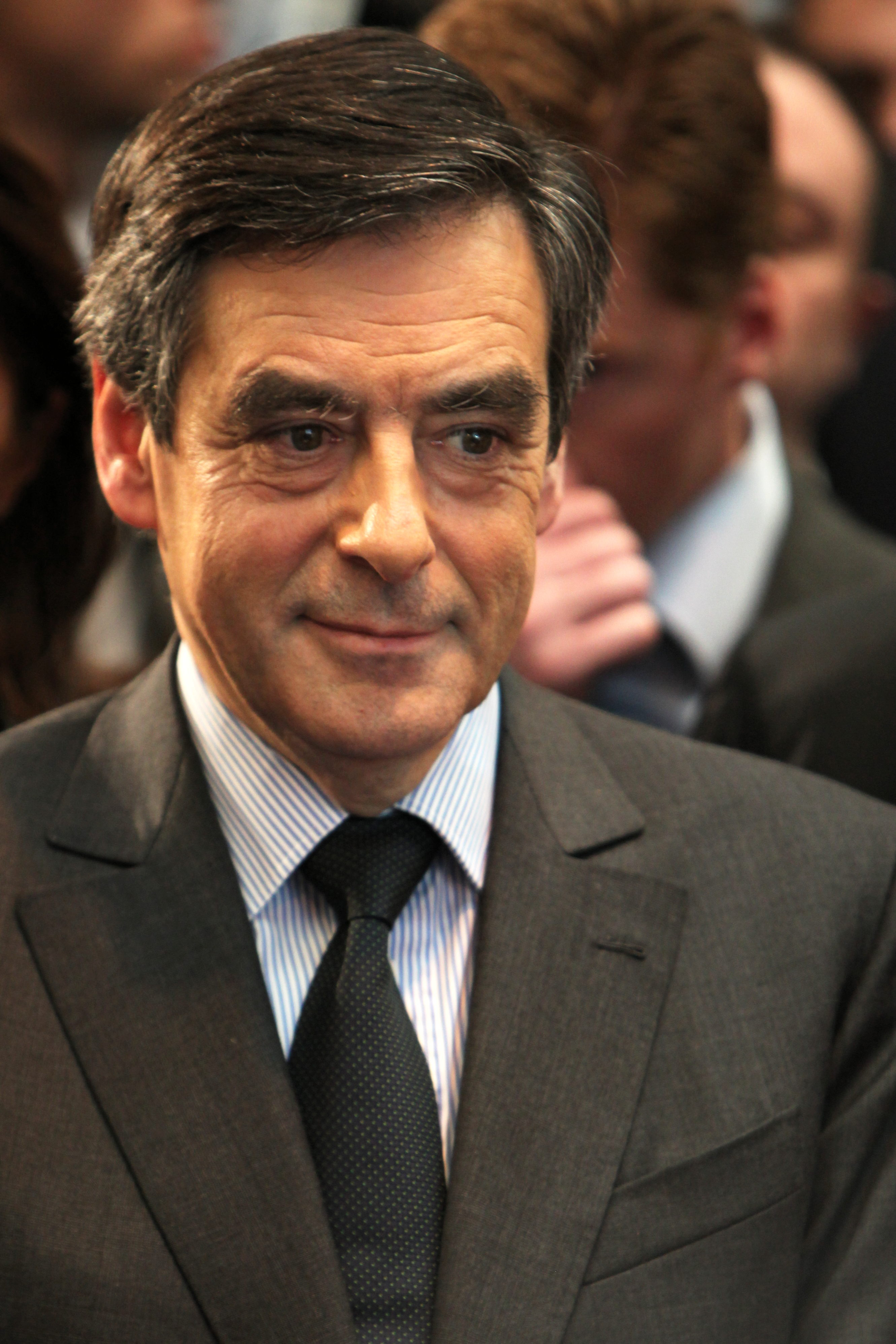
- Date formed: 17 May 2007
- Date dissolved: 19 June 2007

People and organisations
- Head of state: Nicolas Sarkozy
- Head of government: Francois Fillon
- Member party: UMP NC
- Status in legislature: Majority Government

History
- Election: 2007 French legislative election
- Legislature term: 13th legislature of the French Fifth Republic
- Predecessor: Villpen Government
- Successor: Second Fillon Government

The Cabinet of François Fillon were the members appointed by Prime Minister of France Francois Fillon in his two terms between 2007 and 2012.

== Fillon's First Government ==
From 17 May, to 18 June 2007.

- François Fillon – Prime Minister

=== Ministers ===
- Alain Juppé – Minister of State, Minister of Ecology and Sustainable Development and Planning (resigned on 17 June 2007 following his defeat in the legislative elections and thus non-reelection as a deputy for Bordeaux);
- Jean-Louis Borloo – Minister of the Economy, Finance and Employment;
- Michèle Alliot-Marie – Minister of the Interior, Overseas and Territorial Collectivities;
- Bernard Kouchner – Minister of Foreign and European Affairs;
- Brice Hortefeux – Minister of Immigration, Integration, National identity and Co-development;
- Rachida Dati – Keeper of the seals, Minister of Justice;
- Xavier Bertrand – Minister of Labour, Social Relations and Solidarity;
- Xavier Darcos – Minister of National Education;
- Valérie Pécresse – Minister of Higher Education and Research;
- Hervé Morin – Minister of Defence;
- Roselyne Bachelot-Narquin – Minister of Health, Youth Affairs and Sport;
- Christine Boutin – Minister of Housing and City;
- Christine Lagarde – Minister of Agriculture and Fishing;
- Christine Albanel – Minister of Culture and Communication – Spokeswoman of the Government;
- Éric Wœrth – Minister of Budget, Public Accounting and Civil Servants.

=== Secretaries of State ===
- Roger Karoutchi – Secretary of State for Relations with Parliament (under Fillon);
- Éric Besson – Secretary of State for Economic Prospective and Evaluation of Public Policies (under Fillon);
- Dominique Bussereau – Secretary of State for Transport (under Juppé);
- Jean-Pierre Jouyet – Secretary of State for European Affairs (under Kouchner).

=== High Commissioner ===
- Martin Hirsch – High Commissioner for Active Solidarities against Poverty.

== Fillon's Second Government ==
Appointed on 19 June 2007

- François Fillon – Prime Minister.

=== Ministers ===
- Jean-Louis Borloo – Minister of State, Minister of Ecology and Sustainable Development and Planning;
- Michèle Alliot-Marie – Minister of the Interior, Overseas and Territorial Collectivities;
- Bernard Kouchner – Minister of Foreign and European Affairs;
- Christine Lagarde – Minister of the Economy, Finance and Employment;
- Brice Hortefeux – Minister of Immigration, Integration, National identity and Co-development;
- Rachida Dati – Keeper of the seals, Minister of Justice;
- Michel Barnier – Minister of Agriculture and Fishing;
- Xavier Bertrand – Minister of Labour, Social Relations and Solidarity;
- Xavier Darcos – Minister of National Education;
- Valérie Pécresse – Minister of Higher Education and Research;
- Hervé Morin – Minister of Defence;
- Roselyne Bachelot-Narquin – Minister of Health, Youth Affairs and Sport;
- Christine Boutin – Minister of Housing and City;
- Christine Albanel – Minister of Culture and Communication;
- Éric Wœrth – Minister of Budget, Public Accounting and Civil Servants.

=== Secretaries of State ===
- Roger Karoutchi – Secretary of State for Relations with Parliament (under Fillon);
- Jean-Pierre Jouyet – Secretary of State for European Affairs (under Kouchner);
- Laurent Wauquiez – Secretary of State, Spokesman of the Government (under Fillon);
- Éric Besson – Secretary of State for Economic Prospective and Evaluation of Public Policies (under Fillon);
- Valérie Létard – Secretary of State for Solidarity (under Bertrand);
- Dominique Bussereau – Secretary of State for Transport (under Borloo);
- Nathalie Kosciusko-Morizet – Secretary of State for Ecology (under Borloo);
- Christian Estrosi – Secretary of State for Overseas (under Alliot-Marie);
- André Santini – Secretary of State for Civil Servants (under Wœrth);
- Jean-Marie Bockel – Secretary of State for Cooperation and Francophony (under Kouchner);
- Hervé Novelli – Secretary of State for Companies and Foreign Commerce (under Lagarde);
- Fadela Amara – Secretary of State for Urban Policies (under Boutin);
- Alain Marleix – Secretary of State for Veterans (under Morin);
- Rama Yade – Secretary of State for Foreign Affairs and Human Rights (under Kouchner);
- Luc Chatel – Secretary of State for Consumer affairs and Tourism (under Lagarde);
- Bernard Laporte – Secretary of State for Sport (under Bachelot-Narquin).

=== High Commissioner ===
- Martin Hirsch – High Commissioner for Active Solidarities against Poverty.

== Shuffles ==
=== Appointment of Secretary of State for Sport ===
22 October 2007

- Bernard Laporte is appointed Secretary of State for Sport (under Bachelot-Narquin).

=== After Municipal Elections of 2008 ===
18 March 2008
There was a shuffle of the secretaries of state following the municipal elections of 16 March 2008.

==== New Secretaries of State ====
- Yves Jégo is appointed Secretary of State for Overseas (under Alliot-Marie) to replace Christian Estrosi;
- Hubert Falco is appointed Secretary of State for development of the territory (under Borloo);
- Nadine Morano is appointed Secretary of State for Family (under Bertrand);
- Christian Blanc is appointed Secretary of State for the development of the «Région Capitale» (Region of Paris) (under Borloo);
- Anne-Marie Idrac is appointed Secretary of State for Foreign Commerce (under Lagarde);
- Alain Joyandet is appointed Secretary of State for Cooperation and Francophony to replace Jean-Marie Bockel (under Kouchner).

==== Changes of attributions – Ministers ====
- Jean-Louis Borloo – formerly Minister of State, Minister of Ecology and Sustainable Development and Planning becomes Minister of State, Minister of Ecology, Energy, Sustainable Development and Planning;
- Christine Lagarde – formerly Minister of the Economy, Finance and Employment becomes Minister of the Economy, Industry and Employment;
- Brice Hortefeux – formerly Minister of Immigration, Integration, National identity and Co-development becomes Minister of Immigration, Integration, National identity and Solidary development;
- Xavier Bertrand – formerly Minister of Labour, Social Relations and Solidarity becomes Minister of Labour, Social Relations, Family and Solidarity;
- Roselyne Bachelot-Narquin – formerly Minister of Health, Youth Affairs and Sport becomes Minister of Health, Youth Affairs, Sport and Associations.

==== Changes of attributions – Secretaries of State ====
- Laurent Wauquiez formerly Spokesman of the Government, is appointed Secretary of State for Employment (under Lagarde);
- Luc Chatel formerly Secretary of State for Consumer affairs and Tourism is appointed Secretary of State for Consumer affairs and Industry, Spokesman of the Government (under Lagarde);
- Éric Besson – Secretary of State for Economic Prospective and Evaluation of Public Policies is now also in charge of the Development of digital economy (under Fillon);
- Jean-Marie Bockel – formerly Secretary of State for Cooperation and Francophony (under Kouchner), becomes Secretary of State for Defense and Veterans (under Morin);
- Alain Marleix – formerly Secretary of State for Veterans (under Morin) becomes Secretary of State for Local Collectivities (under Alliot-Marie);
- Bernard Laporte – formerly Secretary of State for Sport becomes Secretary of State for Sport, Youth and Associations (under Bachelot-Narquin);
- Hervé Novelli – formerly Secretary of State for Companies and Foreign Commerce (under Lagarde) becomes Secretary of State for commerce, craft, small and medium companies, tourism and services (under Lagarde).

=== In December 2008 ===
- Patrick Devedjian is appointed minister under the prime minister in charge of the Implementation of the Recovery Plan;
- Bruno Le Maire replaces Jean-Pierre Jouyet as Secretary of State for European Affairs.

=== In January 2009 – Xavier Bertrand becomes head of UMP ===
- Brice Hortefeux becomes Minister of Labour, Social Relations, Solidarity and City to replace Xavier Bertrand;
- Éric Besson becomes Minister of Immigration, Integration, National identity and Solidary development;
- Nathalie Kosciusko-Morizet becomes Secretary of State for Economic Prospective and Development of digital economy (under Fillon);
- Christine Boutin, formerly Minister of Housing and City becomes Minister of Housing;
- Bernard Laporte becomes back Secretary of State for Sport;
- Martin Hirsch becomes High Commissioner for Active Solidarities against Poverty and High Commissioner for Youth;
- Létard, Amara, Morano and are now Secretaries of State with Hortefeux;
- Woerth is now in charge of Evaluation of Public Policies;
- Chantal Jouanno becomes Secretary of State for Ecology, replacing Nathalie Kosciusko-Morizet.

=== In June 2009 – After the European parliamentary elections ===
- Jean-Louis Borloo – Minister of State, Minister of Ecology, Energy, Sustainable Development and Sea, in charge of green technologies and of climate change negotiations;
- Michèle Alliot-Marie – Minister of State, Keeper of the seals, Minister of Justice and Freedoms;
- Brice Hortefeux – Minister of the Interior, Overseas and Territorial Collectivities;
- Xavier Darcos – Minister of Labour, Social Relations, Family and Solidarity;
- Éric Wœrth – Minister of Budget, Public Accounting, Civil Servants and Reform of the State;
- Luc Chatel – Minister of National Education, Spokesman of the Government;
- Bruno Le Maire – Minister of Food, Agriculture and Fishing;
- Frédéric Mitterrand – Minister of Culture and Communication;
- Michel Mercier – Minister of Rural Space and Spatial Planning;
- Henri de Raincourt – Minister of Parliamentary Relations (under Fillon);
- Christian Estrosi – Minister of Industry (under Lagarde);
- Valérie Létard – Secretary of State (under Borloo)
- Jean-Marie Bockel – Secretary of State (under Alliot-Marie);
- Hervé Novelli – Secretary of State for Commerce, Craftsmanship, Small and Medium Businesses, Tourism, Services and Consumer Rights (under Lagarde);
- Rama Yade – Secretary of State for Sport (under Bachelot-Narquin);
- Hubert Falco – Secretary of State for Defense and Veterans (under Morin);
- Nadine Morano – Secretary of State for Family and Solidarity (under Darcos);
- Pierre Lellouche – Secretary of State for European Affairs (under Kouchner);
- Nora Berra – Secretary of State for the Elderly (under Darcos);
- Benoist Apparu – Secretary of State for Housing and City (under Borloo);
- Marie-Luce Penchard – Secretary of State for Overseas (under Hortefeux);
- Christian Blanc – Secretary of State for the development of the «Région Capitale» (Region of Paris) (under Fillon).

In addition:

- Bernard Kouchner;
- Christine Lagarde;
- Patrick Devedjian;
- Valérie Pécresse;
- Hervé Morin;
- Roselyne Bachelot;
- Eric Besson;
- Laurent Wauquiez;
- Nathalie Kosciusko-Morizet;
- Dominique Bussereau;
- Fadela Amara;
- Alain Marleix;
- Anne-Marie Idrac;
- Alain Joyandet;
- Chantal Jouanno;
- Martin Hirsch;

keep their current functions.
