= Liberal Democratic Party (France) =

Liberal Democratic Party Parti libéral démocrate
- President: Aurélien Véron
- Founded: September 2008
- Dissolved: 2019
- Split from: Liberal Alternative
- Headquarters: 5, rue du Mail; 75002 Paris
- Ideology: Classical liberalism
- National affiliation: Union of Democrats and Independents
- European affiliation: European Party for Individual Liberty
- Colours: Sky blue and gold

The Liberal Democratic Party (French: Parti libéral démocrate, PLD) was a classical liberal political party in France. It was founded in 2008 by a split in the Liberal Alternative. It seeks to fulfil the same role as the former Liberal Democracy, uniting supporters of Alain Madelin.

== History ==
In the 2010 regional elections, the PLD were allied to Liberal Alternative and the Centrist Alliance. In the 2012 presidential election, the PLD didn't run its own candidate, but endorsed François Bayrou in the first round and Nicolas Sarkozy in the second round. In the 2012 legislative election, the party ran some of its own candidates, but also endorsed a number of Miscellaneous right, Union for a Popular Movement, Centrist Alliance, and Democratic Movement candidates.

== See also ==
- Politics of France
- List of political parties in France
