= Édouard Fillias =

French politician

Edouard Fillias
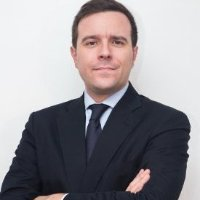
- Born: April 21, 1979 (age 47); Paris, France
- Education: Sciences Po; HEC Paris
- Occupations: Founder and President of Liberal Alternative (2006–2007); Founder and President of Liberté chérie (2001–2005)

Édouard Fillias (born 21 April 1979) is a French classical liberal activist of Spanish origin.

== Biography ==
Born in Paris, Fillias was president of Liberal Alternative and that party's 2007 French Presidential candidate. He is a graduate of Sciences Po and HEC Paris.

== Political and associative commitment ==
On March 1, 2006 he participated in the creation of a new liberal political party Liberal Alternative of which he became president.

On 13 March 2007 he withdrew and announced his support for François Bayrou. He was formerly president of Liberté chérie, and is married to Sabine Herold, a fellow activist.

In 2009, he professionally managed the internet aspects of the campaign of the Libertas list of Philippe de Villiers and Frédéric Nihous for the European elections, but said he had ceased all political involvement.
