= Florence Noiville =

French author and journalist

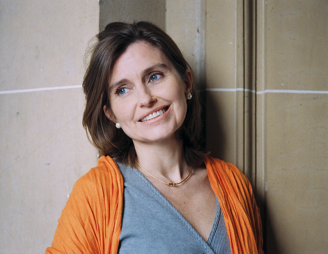
- Noiville in 2009
- Born: 23 July 1961 (age 65); Paris, France
- Education: HEC Paris; Sciences Po
- Occupation: Writer/Journalist
- Spouse: Martin Hirsch
- Children: Raphaëlle, Mathilde, Juliette
- Writing career
- Language: French
- Notable works: The Gift, The Attachment
- Notable awards: Simone Veil Prize in 2019 for "Nina Simone. Love Me or Leave Me" Biographical Story Award in 2004 for "Isaac B. Singer. A Life" Honorable mention at the RagazziAwards at the Bologna Book Festival in 2009 for "Et toi, ta grand-mère ?" Legion of Honour, 2014
- Website: noiville.com

Florence Noiville (French: [nwavil]), a French author and journalist, is a long time staff writer for Le Monde and editor of foreign fiction for Le Monde des Livres, the literary supplement of Le Monde.

== Life ==
After attending Sciences Po, the international business school HEC Paris, and receiving her Masters' in Business Law, Noiville began her professional career in an American corporation, working in the financial sector. Against all odds, she moved four years later from numbers to letters, leading her career towards what had always interested her: writing and literature. Since 1994 she has worked as a journalist and literary critic for the French newspaper Le Monde. She has done numerous interviews and profiles including Saul Bellow, Imre Kertész, John le Carré, Mario Vargas Llosa, Herta Müller. Her interviews and portraits of writers were published in English in Literary Miniatures (Seagull Books).

From 2007 to 2010, she also hosted a literary show on French television channel LCI entitled "Le Monde des Livres". Among the authors she invited to her show are: Claude Lanzmann, Joseph Stiglitz, Paul Auster, Umberto Eco... In 2007-2008, she was a judge for the Independent Foreign Fiction Prize organized by The Independent and the British Council in London.

Florence Noiville is also the author of four novels, two biographies and a pamphlet on the excesses of capitalism, called I Went to Business School and I apologize. Her novels combine literature and neuroscience. Her books are translated into 13 languages.

== Personal ==
Florence Noiville is married to Martin Hirsch. They live in Paris with their three children.

== Works ==
=== Adult books ===
==== Fiction ====
- The Gift, Northwestern University Press, 2012 (La Donation, Stock, 2007)
- The Attachment, Seagull Books, 2014 (L'Attachement, Stock, 2012)
- A Cage in Search of a Bird, Seagull Books, 2016
- Confessions d'une Cleptomane, Stock, 2018

==== Biography ====
- Isaac B. Singer, A Life, Farrar, Straus and Giroux, 2006 (Isaac B. Singer, Stock, 2003). Biographical Story Award 2014.
- Nina Simone. Love me or leave me, Paris, Tallandier, 2019, co-written with her daughter Mathilde Hirsch. Simone Veil Prize 2019.

==== Essay ====
- I Went to Business School and I Apologize, Stock, 2009
- Literary Miniatures, Seagull Books, 2017
- Après: Six femmes pour un monde différent, Stock, 2020, co-written with her daughter Juliette Hirsch.

=== Children's books ===
- Passions Couleurs, Gallimard Jeunesse, 1998, a conversation with Jacqueline Duhême
- Je cherche les clés du paradis, L'École des loisirs, 1999
- La Mythologie grecque, Actes Sud Junior, 2000
- Les Héros grecs, Actes Sud Junior, 2002
- La Mythologie romaine, Actes Sud Junior, 2003
- Histoires insolites des saints du calendrier, Actes Sud Junior, 2004
- Bébé Jules qui ne voulait pas naître, Gallimard Jeunesse, 2005
- Petites histoires de derrières les fourneaux, Actes Sud Junior, 2006
- Et toi, ta grand-mère ?, Actes Sud Junior, 2008
