= The Alliance (France) =

Former political alliance in France

The Alliance Republican, Ecologist and Social Alliance L'Alliance républicaine, écologiste et sociale
- Leader: Hervé Morin; Jean-Louis Borloo; Jean-Marie Bockel; Hervé de Charette
- Founded: 26 June 2011
- Dissolved: 17 September 2012
- Succeeded by: Union of Democrats and Independents
- Ideology: Centrism; Liberalism; Social liberalism Pro-Europeanism
- European Parliament group: European People's Party

Website
- Alliance-pour-une-France-juste.fr

The Alliance (French: L'Alliance) or Republican, Ecologist and Social Alliance (L'Alliance républicaine, écologique et sociale, ARES), often referred as "Confederation of the Centres" (Confédération des Centres), was a centrist, liberal, ecologist, and social-liberal coalition of political parties in France.

In a government reshuffle in November 2010, Jean-Louis Borloo, minister of Ecology, Energy and Sustainable Development and leader of the Radical Party, and Hervé Morin, minister of Defence and leader of New Centre, were excluded by Prime Minister François Fillon. This led many centrists to distance from President Nicolas Sarkozy. On 7 April 2011 Borloo announced the creation of a centrist coalition. On 14–15 May, during a party congress, the Radicals decided to cut their ties with Sarkozy's Union for a Popular Movement (UMP), of which they had been an associate party since 2002. The coalition was officially launched during a convention on 26 June 2011.

The loose coalition was supplanted in September 2012 by the Union of Democrats and Independents (UDI).

== Members ==
- New Centre (leader: Hervé Morin; ideology: Centrism, Social liberalism; 23 deputies, 10 senators, 3 MEPs)
- Radical Party (leader: Jean-Louis Borloo; ideology: Social liberalism; 20 deputies, 6 senators, 3 MEPs)
- Modern Left (leader: Jean-Marie Bockel; ideology: Social liberalism; 2 senators and 2 MEPs)
- Democratic Convention (leader: Hervé de Charette; ideology: Liberalism; 2 deputies and 1 MEP)
