= Liberté chérie (association) =

French political association

Liberté Chérie ("Cherished Liberty") is a French association created in March 2001 under the name Liberté j'écris ton nom ("Liberty, I write your name"). It first came to public prominence on 15 June 2003, when after its call to demonstrate "in favour of reforms and against blockings" and against government employees who were striking, an estimated 80,000 protesters, according to the Direction centrale des renseignements généraux, gathered on the Place de la Concorde in Paris. Promoting libertarian values both in society and in the media, Liberté Chérie as of January 2004 turned itself into a federation of associations active in the whole of French territory.

Former members of the association took part in the creation of Alternative Libérale.

The name "Liberté chérie" alludes to "Liberté chérie, j'écris ton nom" by French poet Paul Eluard, first published in "Poésie et vérité" (1942).

The original founder is Édouard Fillias, the chairman is Vincent Ginocchio and the spokesman is Jeannette Jaussaud.

== See also ==
- Libertarianism
- Tax Freedom Day
