= The Alternative (France) =

The Alternative L'Alternative
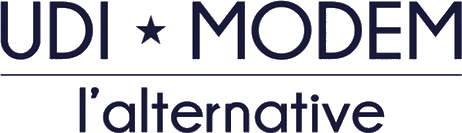
- Founded: 5 November 2013
- Dissolved: 14 November 2014
- Preceded by: Union of Democrats and Independents; Democratic Movement
- European affiliation: European Democratic Party
- French Assembly: 31 / 577
- French Senate: 42 / 348
- European Parliament: 8 / 74

The Alternative (French: L'Alternative) was an electoral coalition created the fall of 2013 by Jean-Louis Borloo and François Bayrou. It reunited the two major French centrists political parties: the Union of Democrats and Independents and the Democratic Movement. The Alternative united movements that had formerly been part of the Union for French Democracy and presented itself in the municipal elections of 2014 and in the following European Parliament election.
