= Émile Muller =

French politician (1915–1988)

Émile Muller (20 April 1915, Mulhouse, Haut-Rhin – 11 November 1988) was a French politician from Alsace. He was the candidate of the Democratic Socialist Movement of France in the 1974 French presidential election, where he won only 0.69% of the vote.

He was at first a member of the French Section of the Workers' International (SFIO), before leaving the party in 1970 to protest its alliance with the French Communist Party. He then founded the Party of Socialist Democracy (PDS), which participated in the Reforming Movement in 1972. In December 1973 he founded the Democratic Socialist Movement of France, or MDSF. The MDSF nominated him as its candidate in 1974 French presidential election, where he won only 0.69%.

In 1981, he was succeeded by Joseph Klifa as mayor of Mulhouse. He had held the city since 1956. He also stepped down as deputy in 1981; he had represented the Haut-Rhin since 1958.
