= Union of Radical Republicans =

The Union of Radical Republicans (Union des républicains radicaux, U2R) is a French political party with its origins in the Radical faction of the Republican Pole, an organization rallying together supporters of Jean-Pierre Chevènement's candidacy for the 2002 presidential election. It included members of the Left Radical Party, including Emile Zuccarelli, as well as Valoisien Radicals, including Gérard Benhamou, a former UDF MEP.

The U2R has since distanced itself from Chevènement's Citizen and Republican Movement (MRC), and supported François Bayrou's candidacy for the 2007 presidential election. However it later distanced itself from Bayrou and joined The Progressives.
