= Jean-Marie Bockel =

French politician

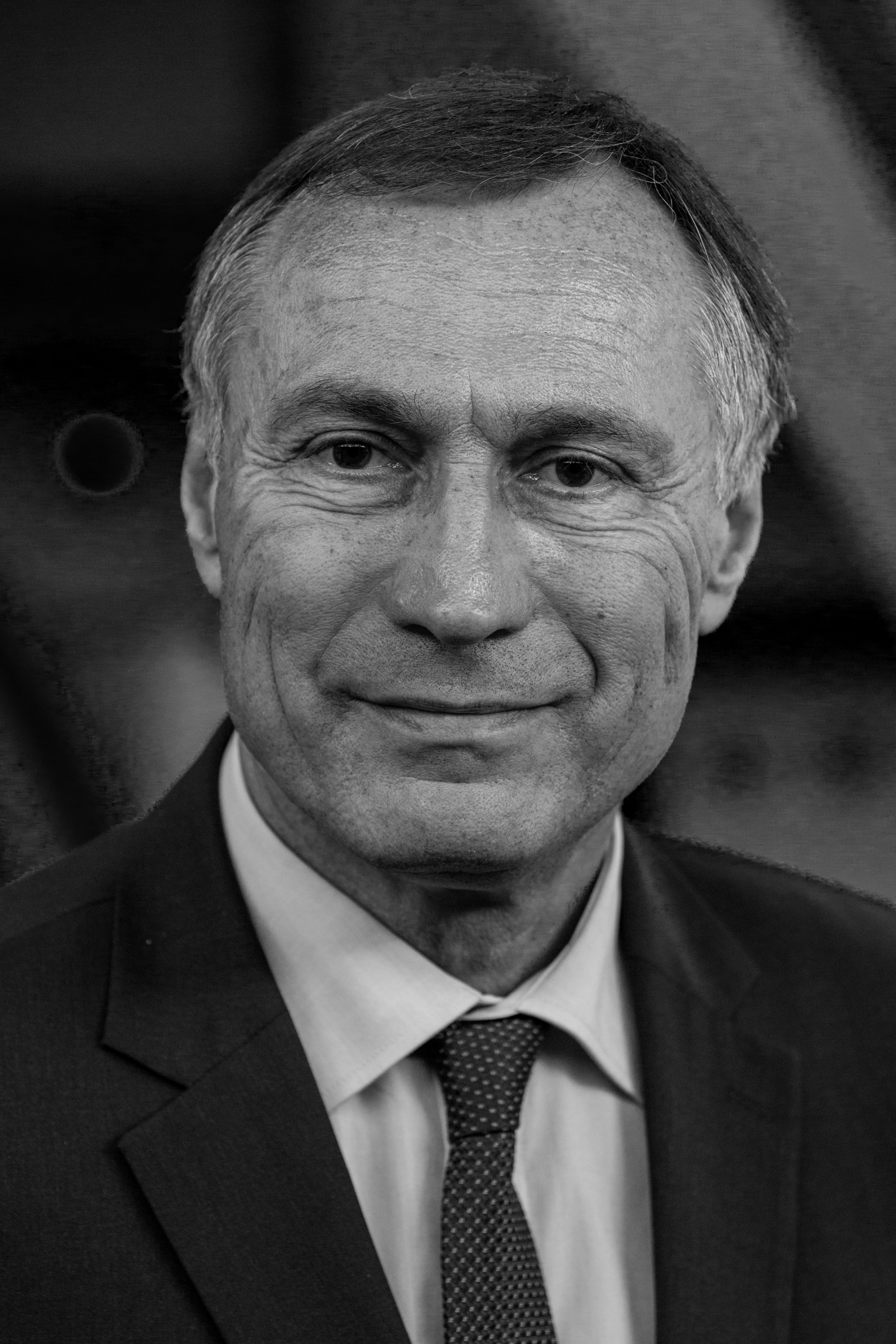

Member of the French Senate for Haut-Rhin
- In office 14 December 2010 – 30 September 2020
- Preceded by: Jacques Muller
- Succeeded by: Ludovic Haye

State Secretary of Justice
- In office 23 June 2009 – 13 November 2010
- President: Nicolas Sarkozy
- Prime Minister: François Fillon
- Preceded by: None

Secretary of State for Veterans' Affairs
- In office 18 March 2008 – 23 June 2009
- President: Emmanuel Macron
- Prime Minister: François Fillon
- Preceded by: Alain Marleix
- Succeeded by: Hubert Falco

Minister Delegate for Development and Francophonie
- In office 18 June 2007 – 18 March 2008
- President: Nicolas Sarkozy
- Prime Minister: François Fillon
- Preceded by: Brigitte Girardin
- Succeeded by: Alain Joyandet

Mayor of Mulhouse
- In office 1989–2010
- Preceded by: Joseph Klifa
- Succeeded by: Jean Rottner

Personal details
- Born: 22 June 1950 (age 75) Strasbourg, France
- Party: Modern Left

Jean-Marie Bockel (born 22 June 1950) is a French politician who has been serving as President Emmanuel Macron's Personal Envoy for Africa since 2024.

Earlier in his political career, Bockel served in several government positions, including as State Secretary of Justice (2009–2010), Secretary of State for Defence and Veterans (2008–2009) and Secretary of State for Cooperation and La Francophonie (2007–2008) in the government of Prime Minister François Fillon as well as Minister for Commerce (1984–1986) in the government of Prime Minister Laurent Fabius.

Bockel was a member of the French National Assembly from 1981, when he first stood as a Socialist Party candidate, and later served as a member of the Senate of France from 2004 to 2007 and again from 2010 to 2020.

== Early life and career ==
Bockel (commonly referred to as "JMB" in France) was born in Strasbourg. He is a lawyer.

== Political career ==
Bockel served as mayor of Mulhouse from 1989 to 2010. On the right wing of the Socialist Party, he declared himself to be an admirer and strong supporter of the policies of Tony Blair.

In 2006, together with Christian Blanc and Alain Lambert, Bockel launched the Committee for the Modernization of France that sought the "comprehensive and coherent" modernization of the French economy and society.

In August 2007, Bockel for the first time joined a cabinet under President Nicolas Sarkozy, arguing that Sarkozy's UMP was committed to genuine reform while his own party had failed to evolve. He subsequently had to leave the Socialist Party.

In November 2007 Bockel announced the formation of a new centre-left political party, Modern Left (Gauche Moderne), and used this party as a vehicle to campaign in the 2008 municipal elections for a fourth term as mayor.

During his time in the Fillon government, Bockel became an outspoken critic of the Françafrique idea. He also criticized the "squandering of public funds" by some African regimes.

In a 2010 cabinet reshuffle, Bockel was replaced by Hubert Falco.

As a member of the Senate from 2004 to 2007 and again from 2010 to 2014, Bockel represented the department of Haut-Rhin and served on the Committee on Foreign Affairs and Defense. In this capacity, he notably authored a 2012 report calling on the French government to ban the use of routers and other equipment from Huawei and ZTE in French telecommunications networks.

In addition to his work in the Senate, Bockel served as member of the French delegation to the Parliamentary Assembly of the Council of Europe from 2012 to 2015. In this capacity, he was a member of the Committee on Political Affairs and Democracy (2012–2015); the Sub-Committee on the Rights of Minorities (2012–2015); and the Sub-Committee on conflict prevention through dialogue and reconciliation (2012–2013). He also participated in the Assembly’s observer mission to the 2014 Tunisian presidential election and later served as the Assembly’s rapporteur on humanitarian consequences of the threats posed by the terrorist group Islamic State.

Ahead of the 2012 presidential elections, Bockel publicly declared his support for Sarkozy as the Republicans' candidate.

In 2022, President Macron appointed Bockel as chair of a commission in charge of "recognition" and "reparations" for the Harkis, the Muslims who served as civilian auxiliaries in the French army during the Algerian War (1954-1962).

In February 2024, President Macron appointed Bockel as his "personal envoy" to Africa.

In November 2024, Jean-Marie Bockel will submit a report to President Emmanuel Macron on the reconfiguration of the French military presence in Africa. The report advocates a “renewed” and “rebuilt” partnership with African countries.

=== Governmental functions ===
Secretary of State for Prisons and Prison Reform : 2009–2010.

Secretary of State for Defense and Veterans : 2008–2009.

Secretary of State for Cooperation and Francophony : 2007–2008.

Minister of Commerce, Handicrafts and Tourism : February–March 1986.

State Secretary to the Minister of Commerce, Handicrafts and Tourism : 1984–1986.

=== Electoral mandates ===
National Assembly of France

Member of the National Assembly of France for Haut-Rhin : 1981–1984 (Became secretary of State in 1984) / 1986–1993 / 1997–2002. Elected in 1981, reelected in 1986, 1988, 1997.

Senate of France

Senator of Haut-Rhin : 2004–2007 (Became secretary of State in 2007). Elected in 2004. Reelected in 2008, but he stays minister.

General Council

General councillor of Haut-Rhin : 1982–1989 (Resignation) / 1994–1997 (Resignation). Reelected in 1988, 1994.

Municipal Council

Mayor of Mulhouse : 1989–2010 (Resignation). Reelected in 1995, 2001, 2008.

Municipal councillor of Mulhouse : Since 1989. Reelected in 1995, 2001, 2008.

Agglomeration community Council

President of the Agglomeration community of Mulhouse Sud Alsace : Since 2001. Reelected in 2008.

Member of the Agglomeration community of Mulhouse Sud Alsace : Since 2001. Reelected in 2008.

== Other activities ==
- Orous Capital, Member of the Advisory Board (since 2023)
- Tilder, Senior Advisor
- Groupe Hospitalier de la Région de Mulhouse et Sud Alsace, Member of the Board of Directors (–2017)

== Personal life ==
Pierre-Emmanuel, one of Bockel's five sons, died in a helicopter crash in Mali on 25 November 2019.
