= Democratic Convention (France) =

Political party in France

Democratic Convention (French: Convention démocrate, CD) is a centrist-liberal political party in France.

It is the continuation of the Perspectives and Realities Clubs (CPR) and the Popular Party for French Democracy (PPDF), both constituent members of the centre-right Union for French Democracy (UDF), a confederation of parties formed in 1978, and both established under the auspices of Valéry Giscard d'Estaing, president of France from 1974 to 1981 and president of the UDF from 1988 to 1996. The Clubs, established in 1965, were a parallel organisation of Giscard's Independent Republicans and, later, the Republican Party (PR), and a sort of "doctrine laboratory" or think tank, while the PPDF was a full-fledged party formed in 1995 by Giscard's supporters when the PR traced a different political line from its founder.

In 2002 the PPDF left the UDF and joined the Union for a Popular Movement (UMP), the new party formed at the merger of the Rally for the Republic, Liberal Democracy and most of the UDF, not including the party's core which remained autonomous. Within the UMP, the PPDF became a faction and adopted the new name "Democratic Convention".

The affiliation continued until 2010, when the CD joined the New Centre and, through it, The Alliance, a new centrist coalition led by Jean-Louis Borloo. In 2012 the latter evolved into the Union of Democrats and Independents (UDI), to which the CD affiliated. After unsuccessfully running for president of the UDI, Yves Jégo, a former RPR turned Radical, reactivated the Clubs in 2013–2014 to "contribute to the development and deepening of political thought, values and convictions of the liberal, social and European family". The new organisation, less think tank and more political party, was led by Jégo as president and de Charette honorary president. In 2018, after Jégo's retirement, the party was co-chaired by Éric Hélard, Sophie Auconie and Laurent Lafon.
