= Martin Hirsch =

French civil servant (born 1963)

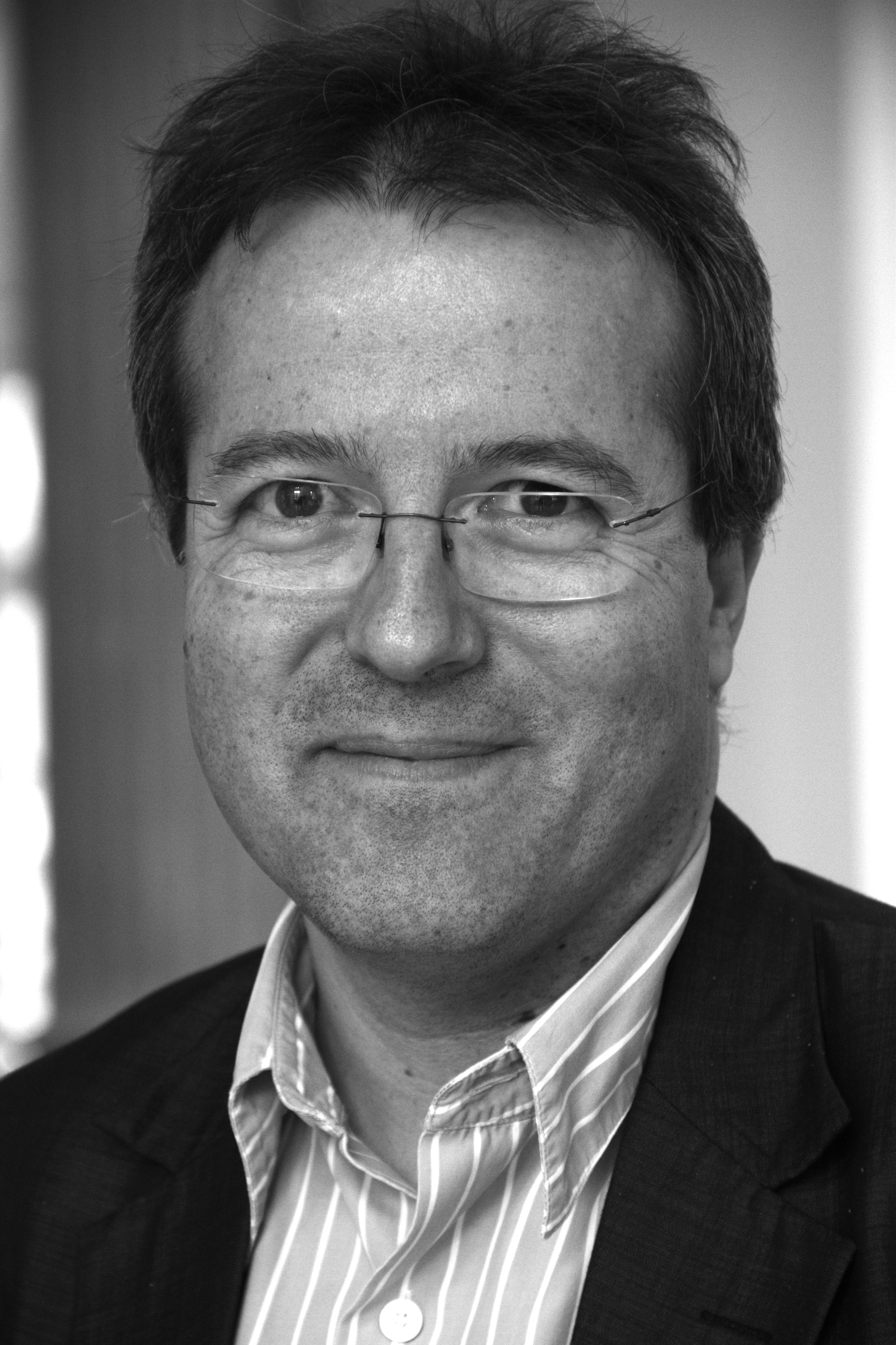
Hirsch in 2013

Martin Hirsch (born 6 December 1963 in Suresnes) is a French civil servant who was the former head of Emmaüs France, the former High Commissioner for Active Solidarity against Poverty, and the High Commissioner for Youth in the government of François Fillon. Hirsch was in charge of setting up the Revenu de solidarité active and left the government in March 2010 to head the state's Civic Service Agency.

Hirsch holds a master's degree in Neurobiology and is an alumnus of the École Normale Supérieure and of the École Nationale d'Administration.

He is married to Florence Noiville.

== Bibliography ==
- Les Enjeux de la protection sociale (1993)
- L'Affolante Histoire de la vache folle (en coll., 1996)
- Ces Peurs qui nous gouvernent (2002)
- Manifeste contre la pauvreté (2004)
- La Pauvreté en héritage: deux millions d'enfants pauvres en France (2006)
- L'abbé Pierre : « Mes amis, au secours ! », coll. "Découvertes Gallimard" (n° 583) (2012)
