= Democratic European Force =

Democratic European Force Force européenne démocrate
- President: Hervé Marseille
- Founder: Jean-Christophe Lagarde
- Founded: 10 July 2012
- Split from: New Centre
- Ideology: Centrism; Social liberalism; Pro-Europeanism; Christian democracy
- Political position: Centre-right
- National affiliation: Union of Democrats and Independents
- European affiliation: European Democratic Party
- European Parliament group: Alliance of Liberals and Democrats
- Colours: Purple
- National Assembly: 2 / 577
- Senate: 4 / 348
- European Parliament: 0 / 74
- Presidency of Regional Councils: 0 / 17
- Presidency of Departmental Councils: 0 / 101

Website
- www.forceeuropeennedemocrate.fr/

The Democratic European Force (Force européenne démocrate, FED) is a centre-right political party in France founded in July 2012 by Jean-Christophe Lagarde and other dissidents of the New Centre who opposed Hervé Morin's leadership. It is a member of the Union of Democrats and Independents.

== Elected officials ==
- Deputies: Jean-Christophe Lagarde, François Rochebloine, André Santini and François Sauvadet
- Senators: Vincent Capo-Canellas, Hervé Marseille, Michel Mercier and Yves Pozzo di Borgo
- Presidents of General Councils: François Sauvadet (Côte-d'Or), Danielle Chuzeville (Rhône)
