= Modern Left =

Political party

Modern Left Gauche Moderne
- Leader: Jean-Marie Bockel
- President: Christian Debève
- Founded: 2007
- Split from: Socialist Party
- Headquarters: 10 rue des Haudriettes; 75003 Paris
- Ideology: Social liberalism
- Political position: Centre
- National affiliation: Union of Democrats and Independents
- European Parliament group: European People's Party (2009–14)
- Colours: Violet
- Seats in the National Assembly: 0 / 577
- Seats in the Senate: 0 / 348
- Seats in the European Parliament: 0 / 74

The Modern Left (French: La Gauche moderne, LGM), was a centrist political party in France active between 2007 and 2017.

The party was founded following the nomination of the former Socialist Party (PS) Senator and Mayor of Mulhouse, Jean-Marie Bockel to the François Fillon government in May 2007. Along with The Progressives of Éric Besson the Modern Left represented the left wing of the coalition supporting the then-President Nicolas Sarkozy. The party calls itself social liberal, and supports a social market economy.

LGM was widely funded by Union for a Popular Movement (UMP), the right-wing party of the presidential majority under president Sarkozy. It received €100,000 in 2008 from UMP.

In the 2008 local elections, the party obtained around 40 councillors, and Bockel won a narrow re-election in Mulhouse. However, the LGM incumbent in Pau, Yves Uriéta, was defeated. In the 2009 European Parliament election, the party obtained two MEPs on the lists of the Union for a Popular Movement. Both MEPs sat, like all other UMP MEPs, in the European People's Party Group.

In 2011, La Gauche Moderne united with centre-right parties (Radical Party, New Centre) to create the Republican, Ecologist and Social Alliance. Under the initiative of Jean-Louis Borloo, the Alliance wanted to present a centrist candidate in the 2012 presidential election. Eventually, Borloo chose not to run for president, and LGM supported Nicolas Sarkozy. In the following legislative election, the party presented 23 candidates alongside the outgoing right-wing majority..

LGM endorsed François Fillon, as the winner of primary of the right and centre, for the 2017 presidential election. In the second round of the ballot, the party called for a vote for Emmanuel Macron against Marine Le Pen.. It has been inactive since 2017..

== Former elected officials ==
- Senators: Daniel Marsin, Jean-Marie Bockel (RDSE)
- MEPs: Michèle Striffler, Marielle Gallo (EPP)

Jean-Marie Bockel was Mayor of Mulhouse from 1989 to 2010 and the party claims a number of councillors in various cities throughout the country.

In addition, Bockel is Secretary of State for Justice and Liberties in the Fillon II government.

== See also ==
- Politics of France
- List of political parties in France
- Sinistrisme
