= Liberal Alternative =

Liberal Alternative Alternative Libérale
- Abbreviation: AL
- Leader: Sabine Herold
- Founded: March 1, 2006
- Dissolved: 2011
- Headquarters: 94, boulevard Flandrin; 75116 Paris
- Ideology: Libertarianism
- Political position: Centre
- Colours: Purple
- National Assembly: 0 / 577
- Senate: 0 / 348
- European Parliament: 0 / 74

Website
- www.alternative-liberale.fr

The Liberal Alternative (French: Alternative Libérale, AL) was a French political party created on March 1, 2006. The party advocates for classical liberalism and libertarianism and against socialism and conservatism. Therefore their political colour is purple, between the red of the left-wing and the blue of the right-wing.

It advocates stronger powers given to the Parliament and a separation from the Prime Minister; favouring a presidential/congressional system as opposed to a strict parliamentary system. It emphasizes a more political, rather than economic, role in the European Union (EU) to promote civil liberties and liberalism as the basis of the EU Constitution.

Some members of Liberté chérie, a classical liberal association, took part in the creation of the Liberal Alternative, including Édouard Fillias, founder of Liberté Chérie, Aurélien Veron, former president and Sabine Herold, cofounder.

== Popular support and electoral record ==
In the 2007 presidential election, Édouard Fillias, the founder and leader of AL, failed to obtain the necessary endorsements from at least 500 French elected officials. Liberal Alternative, with no candidate of its own, endorsed the centrist Union for French Democracy (UDF) candidate François Bayrou.

Liberal Alternative also fielded nearly 50 candidates for the 2007 legislative elections, it obtained between 0.09% and 1.49%.

=== European Parliament ===
European Parliament
Election year	Number of votes	% of overall vote	# of seats won
2009	16,944	0.10%	0

Despite a recent split, AL ran five lists in the 2009 European Parliament election: in the Île-de-France, West, East, South East and South-West constituencies. Overall, the party won 0.10% in Île-de-France, 0.26% in the East, 0.13% in the South-West, 0.02% in the South-East, and 0.18% in the West.
