= Union of Democrats and Independents =

French political party and electoral alliance

Union of Democrats and Independents Union des démocrates et indépendants
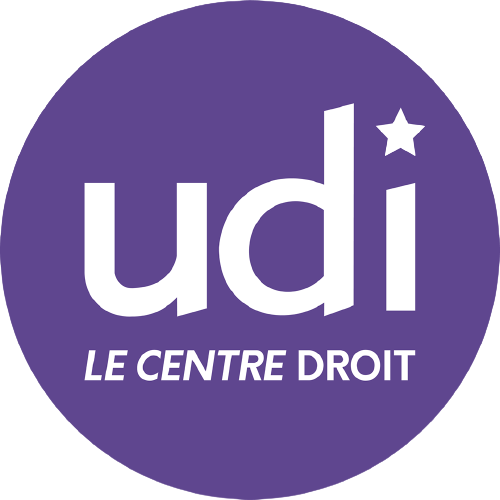
- Abbreviation: UDI
- President: Hervé Marseille
- General Secretaries: Brigitte Fouré; Michel Zumkeller
- Founded: 18 September 2012; 14 years ago
- Split from: Union for a Popular Movement
- Headquarters: 22 bis, Rue des Volontaires, Paris
- LGBT wing: GayLib (until 2018)
- Membership (2017): ▼20,000
- Ideology: Liberalism (French)
- Political position: Centre to centre-right
- National affiliation: Union of the Right and Centre (2012–2024); The Alternative (2013–2014); Ensemble (2024–)
- European affiliation: European Democratic Party (before 2016); Alliance of Liberals and Democrats for Europe (2016–)
- Colours: Violet; Sky blue (customary)
- National Assembly: 7 / 577
- Senate: 36 / 348
- European Parliament: 1 / 81
- Presidency of Regional Councils: 0 / 17
- Presidency of Departmental Councils: 8 / 95

Website
- parti-udi.fr

The Union of Democrats and Independents (French: Union des démocrates et indépendants, pronounced [ynjɔ̃ de demɔkʁat e ɛ̃depɑ̃dɑ̃], UDI) is a liberal political party in France and former electoral alliance founded on 18 September 2012 on the basis of the eponymous parliamentary group in the National Assembly.

The party was composed of separate political parties that retained their legal independence, but were in coalition with the larger right-wing party The Republicans (LR, formerly the Union for a Popular Movement). As most of them have been expelled or left, the Democratic European Force (FED) is the last of the founding parties to remain a participant in the UDI.

The party's current president is Senator Hervé Marseille of the FED, also president of the Centrist Union group in the Senate. He succeeded Jean-Christophe Lagarde, who was elected at the congress of the party on 15 November 2014, following the resignation of Jean-Louis Borloo on 6 April 2014 for health reasons.

The UDI was part of the Ensemble coalition in the 2024 snap legislative election.

== History ==
On 9 October 2012, the leaderships of the parties making up the UDI parliamentary group announced the creation of a new political party and set up a temporary office in Paris. On 21 October, a founding assembly was convened at the Maison de la Mutualité in Paris, which marked the official foundation of the movement.

Following the congress of the Union for a Popular Movement (UMP) on 18 November 2012 and the ensuing tensions between the two rival candidates for the party's presidency, a number of leading figures of the UMP announced that they were joining the UDI, including former cabinet minister and deputy Pierre Méhaignerie and Mayenne deputy Yannick Favennec. However, during a legislative by-election on 9 and 16 December 2012 in the Val-de-Marne's 1st constituency, UDI incumbent Henri Plagnol – a former member of the UMP who had joined the UDI in June – was defeated by a right-wing dissident, Sylvain Berrios.

On 9 June 2013, the UDI gained a deputy (Meyer Habib) at the by-election in the Eighth constituency for French residents overseas, but this contribution was cancelled out by Gilles Bourdouleix's resignation from UDI after the controversy for saying Adolf Hitler had not killed enough Romani people.

The UDI became a member of the Alliance of Liberals and Democrats for Europe Party on 2 December 2016.

Although the UDI leadership supported François Fillon in the 2017 French presidential election, several members of the party were supporting En Marche! candidate Emmanuel Macron.

=== Former members ===
The National Centre of Independents and Peasants was expelled after its leader and only deputy Gilles Bourdouleix's resigned for saying Adolf Hitler had not killed enough Romani people. The Centrist Alliance was excluded on 25 March 2017 as a result of its support for Emmanuel Macron; Territories in Movement left after the results of the 2015 regional elections; and the Liberal Democratic Party (PLD) was excluded from the UDI in December 2013. The Radical Party left after its reunification with the Radical Party of the Left to form the Radical Movement on 10 December 2017 (and therefore the Modern Left as well); on 16 December, The Centrists followed suit in announcing its intention to quit the UDI. The Democratic European Force is the last founding party to remain a component of the UDI.

== Election results ==
=== Legislative elections ===
Election year	1st round		2nd round		Seats	+/−	Rank (seats)	Government
Election year	Votes	%	Votes	%	Seats	+/−	Rank (seats)	Government
2017	687,225	3.03	551,784	3.04	18 / 577	▼10	5th	Opposition
2022	198,062	0.87	64,443	0.31	3 / 577	▼15	16th?	Opposition
2024	114,672	0.36	90,015	0.33	5 / 577	▲2	Part of Ensemble	Government

=== European elections ===
The 2014 elections involved an alliance with the forces of the Democratic Movement (MoDem); this joint list, The Alternative (L'Alternative), saw three UDI MEPs out of seven elected from the list. The change in seats shown is since the 2009 election for the MoDem list.

Election	Leader	Votes	%	Seats	+/−	EP Group
2014 (Note: Run as part of The Alternative coalition.)	Jean-Louis Borloo	1,884,565	9.94 (#4)	4 / 74	New	ALDE
2019	Jean-Christophe Lagarde	566,057	2.50 (#9)	0 / 79	▼4	−
2024 (Note: Run as part of the Ensemble coalition.)	Hervé Marseille	3,589,114	14.56 (#2)	1 / 81	▲1	RE

== See also ==
- The Constructives: Republicans, UDI, and Independents group
- Centrist Union group
