= Democratic Movement (France) =

French political party

Democratic Movement Mouvement démocrate
- Abbreviation: MoDem
- President: François Bayrou
- Founder: François Bayrou
- Founded: 1 December 2007; 18 years ago
- Preceded by: Union for French Democracy
- Headquarters: 133 bis Rue de l'Université; 75007 Paris
- Membership (2017): ▼13,000
- Ideology: Christian democracy
- Political position: Centre-right
- National affiliation: The Alternative (2013–2014); Ensemble (since 2021)
- European affiliation: European Democratic Party
- European Parliament group: Renew Europe
- Colours: Orange
- National Assembly: 36 / 577
- Senate: 4 / 348
- European Parliament: 2 / 81
- Presidency of Regional Councils: 0 / 17
- Presidency of Departmental Councils: 1 / 95

Website
- mouvementdemocrate.fr

The Democratic Movement (French: Mouvement démocrate, pronounced [muvmɑ̃ demɔkʁat]; MoDem [mɔdɛm]) is a centre-right political party in France. MoDem was established by François Bayrou to succeed the Union for French Democracy (UDF) and contest the 2007 legislative election, after his strong showing in the 2007 presidential election. Initially named the Democratic Party (Parti démocrate), the party was renamed "Democratic Movement", because there was already a small Democratic Party in France.

MoDem secured an agreement with La République En Marche! (LRM) — later Renaissance (RE) — in the 2017 legislative election after Bayrou had endorsed the candidacy of Emmanuel Macron in February. The two parties have since been in alliance, as of late named Ensemble.

The party's founder and leader Bayrou served as Prime Minister of France from December 2024 to September 2025. The party has additionally been described as social liberal, pro-European, and moderately reformist with influences from Christian democracy, support for a social market economy, and strict debt regulations.

== History ==
=== Background ===
MoDem traces its roots to the Union for French Democracy (UDF), a centrist coalition/party active from 1978 to 2007. The UDF had always supported centre-right governments since its creation by Valéry Giscard d'Estaing, who was president of France from 1974 to 1981.

In the 2002 presidential election the centre-right was so fractured that each of its constituent parties, the Rally for the Republic, the UDF and Liberal Democracy, ran a candidate: Jacques Chirac (19.9%), François Bayrou (6.8%) and Alain Madelin (3.9%), respectively. Following Chirac's landslide re-election over Jean-Marie Le Pen, the UDF aligned with the newly-formed Union for a Popular Movement (UMP), but chose not to be part of it and, while most of its members directly joined the UMP, the rump of the UDF became increasingly independent. During Chirac's second term, it did not participate in the governments led by Jean-Pierre Raffarin and François Fillon (except for Gilles de Robien), but took part in the government coalition in the Senate until 2007. However, on the initiative of its leader Bayrou, it eventually supported a censure motion along with the Socialist Party (PS).

=== 2007 presidential and legislative elections ===
During the campaign for the 2007 presidential election, candidate Bayrou advocated a national unity government. He presented himself as a centrist and a social-liberal, proclaiming that, if elected, he would "govern beyond the left–right divide". Although eliminated in the first round, he was able to garner 18.6% of the vote, with voters supporting him partly because of his independence from major parties. Following the election, he launched the Democratic Movement (MoDem) on 29 May to reinforce his strategy of political autonomy from the centre-right. MoDem was also supported by the Union of Radical Republicans. Some members of the UDF did not agree with this new strategy because the weighted French balloting system would hinder the party from obtaining seats in the upcoming legislative election. These members created the New Centre (NC) — later The Centrists —, continuing their support for the newly elected president Nicolas Sarkozy.

In the first round of the 2007 legislative election MoDem won 7.6% of the vote. Candidates ran under the UDF-MoDem banner, since the party had not yet been created officially. The party gained only three seats in the National Assembly (not including Abdoulatifou Aly, who was elected in Mayotte for a party affiliated to MoDem, sat with the NC for a while and later sat with MoDem deputies). Additionally, one of its MPs, Thierry Benoit, was vocally critical of the party and its strategy, indicating that he was elected as a UDF, rather than a MoDem, representative, while defending the party's third-way policies, and soon left for Rally the Centrists, later incorporated in the Centrist Alliance.

=== Official foundation and following elections ===
MoDem became an official political party in December 2007 following its founding assembly in Villepinte, Seine-Saint-Denis, in the suburbs of Paris. The assembly elected Bayrou, who ran uncontested, as party president, as well its provisional executive board. In November, the UDF effectively ceased to exist, and was fully integrated into MoDem.

During its early stages, the Democratic Movement attracted a substantial amount of members who had not previously belonged to a political party. In November 2007, approximately 60% of its new members were reported to have no prior affiliation to a party. Online networks played an important role in organizing the movement during that period of time, with more than 200 websites and blogs associated with MoDem contributing to the coordination of activists and discussions on its status. However, the party's establishment also involved internal disagreements over its leadership and political direction, particularly concerning Bayrou's strategy of maintaining independence from the established political blocks.

In the 2009 European Parliament election MoDem won 8.5% of the vote and six seats.

In the 2012 presidential election Bayrou ran for the third time, winning 9.3% of the vote, half of what he had obtained five years before. In the subsequent legislative election the party was reduced to 1.8% and two seats. Also Bayrou lost his seat in the National Assembly, a seat he had held for most of his political career.

MoDem made a comeback in the 2014 European Parliament election: along with the newly-formed Union of Democrats and Independents (UDI), also a successor of the UDF formed by UMP splinters, the party obtained 9.9% of the vote and seven seats. Before that, in the 2014 municipal elections, MoDem scored an average of 15% in cities with more than 10,000 inhabitants, won over 50 cities, including Pau (with Bayrou), Biarritz, Saint-Brieuc, Mont-de-Marsan and Talence, and joined ruling coalitions in Bordeaux, Dijon, Saint-Étienne and Auxerre, among others.

=== Centrist coalition with President Macron ===
In the 2017 presidential election Bayrou did not stand as candidate for the first time in 15 years, but endorsed Emmanuel Macron, who was elected by a landslide in second round over Marine Le Pen. Macron's strategy was to govern beyond the left–right divide, similarly to Bayrou's in 2007 and 2012, and bring about a political realignment. Consequently, in the following legislative election MoDem joined forces with Macron's La République En Marche! (LRM) — later Renaissance (RE) — and largely increased its seats in the National Assembly. Bayrou briefly served as minister of Justice in the first government under president Macron, before resigning as MoDem and its MEPs were accused of potentially fictitious employment practices within the European Parliament. However, MoDem continued to be an active part of the presidential majority and governments for the entire presidential term, as well as in the 2019 European Parliament election.

Macron was then re-elected in the 2022 presidential election, again with MoDem's support. Ahead of the 2022 legislative election, MoDem joined the Ensemble coalition with other centrist parties, notably including RE, Horizons and UDI, but the coalition lost the majority it previously held in the National Assembly. MoDem was part of the coalition also in the 2024 European Parliament election (obtaining three seats, down from five in 2019) and the subsequent, snap 2024 legislative election (obtaining 33 seats, down from 48 in 2022), during which the centrist camp was further reduced in its parliamentary seats. After the enlargement of the government coalition to The Republicans, the centre-right successor of the UMP, with Michel Barnier's minority government and the latter's fall due to a vote of no-confidence, in December 2024 Macron appointed Bayrou as prime minister, at the head of another minority government which would last until September 2025.

== International affiliations ==
In 2004, Bayrou launched the European Democratic Party (EDP) along with his Italian ally Francesco Rutelli, whose Democracy is Freedom – The Daisy party was later incorporated in the social-democratic Democratic Party (PD) and replaced by minor groups in the EDP, as the PD had joined the Party of European Socialists instead. In 2005, the EDP created, along with the New Democrat Coalition of the Democratic Party of the United States, the Alliance of Democrats, a worldwide network of centrist and social-liberal parties.

In the European Parliament, MoDem is part of the Renew Europe Group. In the European Committee of the Regions, MoDem sits in the Renew Europe CoR group, with three full and one alternate members for the 2025-2030 mandate. Mayor of Saint-Omer, François Decoster is the President of the Group.

== Electoral results ==
=== Presidential elections ===
This table includes the 2002 and 2007 elections in which Bayrou presented himself as a candidate of the Union for French Democracy (UDF).

Presidency of the French Republic
| Election year | Candidate | 1st round | | | 2nd round | | | Result |
| Election year | Candidate | Votes | % | Rank | Votes | % | Rank | Result |
|---|---|---|---|---|---|---|---|---|
| 2002 | François Bayrou | 1,949,170 | 6.84 | 4th | —N/a | | | Lost |
| 2007 | François Bayrou | 6,820,119 | 18.57 | 3rd | —N/a | | | Lost |
| 2012 | François Bayrou | 3,275,122 | 9.13 | 5th | —N/a | | | Lost |
| 2017 | Supported Emmanuel Macron | | | | | | | Won |
| 2022 | Supported Emmanuel Macron | | | | | | | Won |

=== Legislative elections ===
National Assembly
| Election year | Leader | 1st round | | 2nd round | | Seats | +/− | Rank (seats) | Government |
| Election year | Leader | Votes | % | Votes | % | Seats | +/− | Rank (seats) | Government |
|---|---|---|---|---|---|---|---|---|---|
| 2007 | François Bayrou | 1,981,107 | 7.61 | 100,115 | 0.49 | 3 / 577 | ▼24 | 9th | Opposition |
| 2012 | François Bayrou | 458,098 | 1.77 | 113,196 | 0.49 | 2 / 577 | ▼1 | 10th | Opposition |
| 2017 | François Bayrou | 932,227 | 4.12 | 1,100,656 | 6.06 | 42 / 577 | ▲40 | 3rd | Presidential majority (under REM) |
| 2022 | François Bayrou | 1,044,807 (Note: Votes obtained as part of Ensemble coalition.) | 4.59 | 1,441,218 | 6.95 | 48 / 577 | ▲6 | 5th | Presidential minority (under Ensemble) |
| 2024 | François Bayrou | 1,205,976 (Note: Votes obtained as part of Ensemble coalition.) | 3.76 | 1,363,656 | 5.00 | 33 / 577 | ▼15 | 6th | Presidential minority (under Ensemble) |

=== European Parliament elections ===
The 2014 elections involved an alliance with the forces of the Union of Democrats and Independents (UDI); this joint list, The Alternative (L'Alternative), saw four MoDem MEPs out of seven elected from the list.

| Election | Leader | Votes | % | Seats | +/− | EP Group |
|---|---|---|---|---|---|---|
| 2009 | François Bayrou | 1,455,841 | 8.46 (#4) | 6 / 72 | ▼5 | ALDE |
| 2014 (Note: Run as part of The Alternative coalition.) | François Bayrou | 1,884,565 | 9.94 (#4) | 4 / 74 | ▼2 | ALDE |
| 2019 (Note: Run as part of the Ensemble coalition.) | François Bayrou | 5,079,015 | 22.42 (#2) | 5 / 79 | ▲1 | RE |
| 2024 | François Bayrou | 3,589,114 | 14.56 (#2) | 3 / 81 | ▼2 | RE |

== See also ==
- Democratic Movement and affiliated group
- Centrist Union group
