= French presidential elections under the Fifth Republic =

Presidential elections since 1958

There have been eleven presidential elections in France since the establishment of the Fifth Republic in 1958.

Originally the president was elected by the Collège des Notables (an assembly of "notable electors") that included around 80,000 county and city/town councillors (who had been elected locally).

Following constitutional reform in November 1962 (the constitutional Act of 6 November), pushed by President de Gaulle, the president has been directly elected by the people of France in a two-round election.

Until a 24 September 2000 constitutional referendum, the president had been elected for a seven-year term since 1974. With the referendum being successful, the term was reduced to five years. Therefore, once the winner of the 2002 election, Jacques Chirac, took office as president, the next election was scheduled for 2007 rather than 2009.

Currently, the President of the French Republic is elected to a five-year term in a two-round election under Article 7 of the Constitution: if no candidate secures an absolute majority (including blank and void ballots) of votes in the first round, a second round is held two weeks later between the two candidates who received the most votes. Since 1965, when the current (direct) election system was introduced, every election has gone to a second round.

The latest election was in 2022. The first round was held on 10 April 2022, the second on 24 April.

== List of elections under the Fifth Republic ==
=== 1958 ===
The 1958 election, held on 21 December, was the sole presidential election by electoral college under the Fifth Republic. Charles de Gaulle, who had come back to power during the May 1958 crisis, was elected with 78.51% of the votes, defeating Georges Marrane, candidate of the French Communist Party (13.03%) and Albert Châtelet, candidate of the moderate left (8.46%).

=== 1965 ===
The 1965 election was the first direct presidential election under the Fifth Republic, following the 1962 presidential election referendum. Charles de Gaulle stood for reelection; his challengers included François Mitterrand, candidate of the non-communist left, centrist candidate Jean Lecanuet and far-right candidate Jean-Louis Tixier-Vignancour. While de Gaulle won the first round with 44.65% of the vote, he unexpectedly came up short of a majority, forcing a runoff against Mitterrand. In the second round, de Gaulle defeated Mitterrand with 55.20% of the vote.

=== 1969 ===
Following de Gaulle's resignation after the failure of the 1969 French constitutional referendum, a snap election was triggered. Former prime minister Georges Pompidou faced centre right candidate Alain Poher, who, as president of the Senate, had become acting president when de Gaulle left office. Pompidou won the first round with 44.47% of the vote, Poher came a distant second (23.31%), communist candidate Jacques Duclos had an unexpectedly strong showing (21.27%) and socialist candidate Gaston Defferre performed dismally (5.01%). In the runoff, which pitted two conservative candidates against each other, Pompidou decisively defeated Poher with 58.21% of the vote.

=== 1974 ===
President Pompidou died in office, triggering another snap election. Minister of Economy Valéry Giscard d'Estaing stood for the centre right, against François Mitterrand who ran for the Union of the Left (left-wing coalition including the Socialist Party and the Communist Party) and former prime minister and Gaullist candidate Jacques Chaban-Delmas. Mitterrand won the first round with 43.25%; Giscard d'Estaing benefited from the support of Gaullist party leader Jacques Chirac and, with 32.60% of the vote, handily defeated Chaban-Delmas (15.11%). Giscard d'Estaing then narrowly defeated Mitterrand in the runoff, with 50.81% of the vote. Other notable candidates included Jean Royer (right-wing conservative), René Dumont (first environmentalist candidate), Arlette Laguiller (far-left, first female candidate) and Jean-Marie Le Pen (far-right); the latter two subsequently ran for president on multiple occasions.

=== 1981 ===
Giscard d'Estaing stood for reelection but had to face competition from his Gaullist former prime minister Jacques Chirac. Mitterrand ran again but, following the split of the Union of the Left, had to face competition from Communist leader Georges Marchais. Giscard d'Estaing won the first round with 28.32%, followed by Mitterrand (25.85%). It was the first election to be held after the voting age was lowered from 21 to 18. In the second round, Mitterrand defeated Giscard d'Estaing with 51.76% of the vote.

=== 1988 ===
Following the left's defeat in the 1986 legislative election, Mitterrand was forced into a cohabitation with a conservative government, headed by Jacques Chirac. In 1988, Mitterrand stood for reelection, which resulted in the unprecedented situation of an incumbent president running against his prime minister. Chirac had to face competition from a centre right candidate, former primer minister Raymond Barre. Mitterrand won the first round by a wide margin (34.10%) and defeated Chirac in the second round (54.02%). The election was also marked by the unexpectedly strong showing of far-right candidate Jean-Marie Le Pen (14.39%) and the poor performance of Communist candidate André Lajoinie (6.76%).

=== 1995 ===
Mitterrand, then forced into a second cohabitation with prime minister Édouard Balladur, did not seek reelection. Emboldened by good poll numbers, Balladur decided to run for president as a dissident conservative candidate, competing against Jacques Chirac. Socialist candidate Lionel Jospin unexpectedly won the first round with 23.30% of the vote, while Chirac defeated Balladur. Le Pen secured 15% of the vote, Communist candidate Robert Hue achieved a somewhat better result than Lajoinie (8.64%) and far-left perennial candidate Arlette Laguiller exceeded the 5% threshold for the first time. Chirac defeated Jospin in the second round with 52.64% of the vote.

=== 2002 ===
Following his decision to call for a snap legislative election in 1997, Chirac was forced into a five-years cohabitation period with his 1995 rival Lionel Jospin. Chirac ran for a second term, reduced to five years following the 2000 referendum. Jospin appeared to be his main challenger, marking the second time an incumbent prime minister ran against the incumbent president. Jospin's candidacy was hampered by multiple competitors on the left. Chirac won the first round with 19.88% of the vote whereas, in a major upset, Jospin was narrowly bypassed by far-right candidate Jean-Marie Le Pen (16.86%). Hue performed dismally (3.37%) and was bypassed by two far-left candidates, marking the communists' decline. Noël Mamère became the first environmentalist candidate to pass the 5% threshold. In the second round, Chirac received support from all major parties and won in a landslide against Le Pen with 82.21% of the vote.

=== 2007 ===
Chirac did not seek reelection. Interior minister Nicolas Sarkozy ran under a conservative platform and won the first round with 31.18% against Socialist candidate Ségolène Royal, who became the first female candidate to reach the second round. The first round was also marked by the unexpectedly strong result of centrist candidate François Bayrou (18.57%) while Le Pen experienced a sharp decline (10.44%). In the runoff, Sarkozy defeated Royal with 53.06%.

=== 2012 ===
Sarkozy stood for reelection; Socialist candidate François Hollande - the first left-wing candidate to be selected by an open primary - won the first round with 28.63% of the vote and went on to defeat Sarkozy in the runoff with 51.64%. The first round was also marked by strong showings from far-right candidate Marine Le Pen, who had succeeded her father (17.90%) and far-left candidate Jean-Luc Mélenchon (11.10%) while Bayrou experienced a decline (9.13%).

=== 2017 ===
Hollande, facing strong internal opposition and dismal poll numbers, did not seek reelection. The Republican and Socialist primaries were unexpectedly won by François Fillon and Benoît Hamon, respectively; but both candidates' campaigns eventually collapsed, with Fillon suffering from a highly-publicized scandal. In a major upset, former Economy minister Emmanuel Macron, who had launched his own campaign, bypassed the traditional parties and won the first round with 24.01% of the vote, followed by Marine Le Pen (21.30%). This marked the second time a far-right candidate reached the runoff. Mélenchon placed fourth behind Fillon, improving his previous performance (19.58%) while Hamon performed dismally (6.36%). While Macron handily won the second round with 66.10%, Le Pen's result marked a sharp increase in far-right votes (33.90%).

=== 2022 ===
Macron stood for reelection, with Marine Le Pen appearing again as his main competitor. Macron won the first round with 27.85%, again followed by Le Pen (23.15%). Jean-Luc Mélenchon improved his showing on the left (21.95%). The previously dominant parties suffered an unprecedented defeat: Republican candidate Valérie Pécresse secured 4.78% of the vote while Socialist candidate Anne Hidalgo received 1.75%. Éric Zemmour (7,07%) failed to wrest leadership on the far-right from Marine Le Pen. In the second round, Macron defeated Le Pen again with 58.55% of the vote, but Le Pen significantly improved her showing (41.45%).

=== Upcoming election ===
The next presidential election is scheduled to be held on 18 April 2027, with a second round on 2 May.

== See also ==
- President of France
- Politics of France
