= 1958 French presidential election =

- 21 December 1958

Electoral college of France
- Registered: 81,764
- Turnout: 99.42%
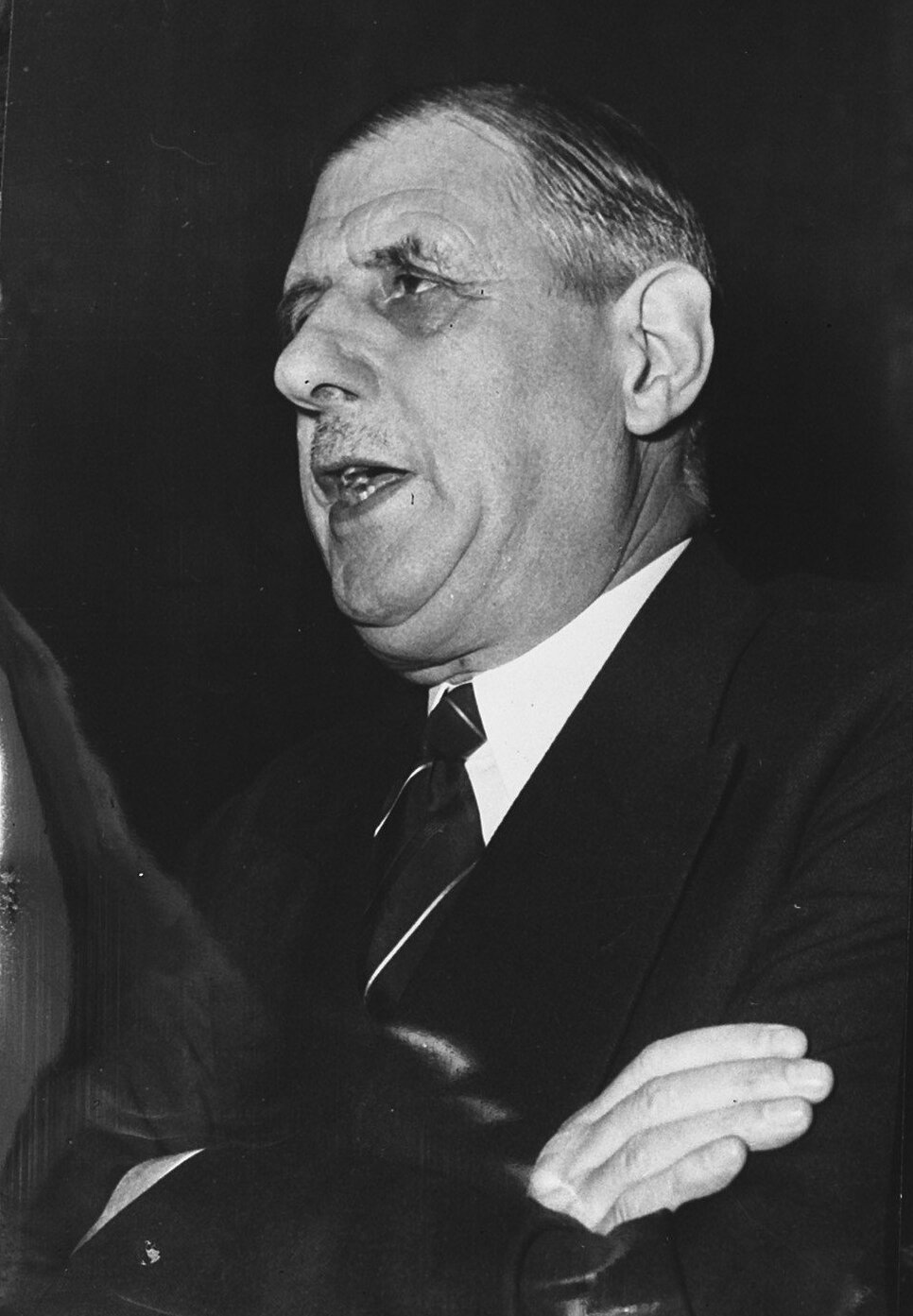

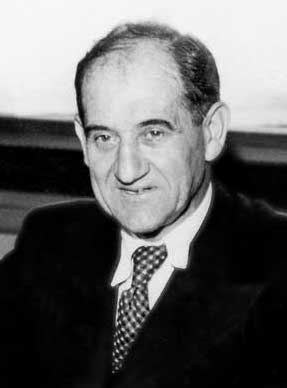

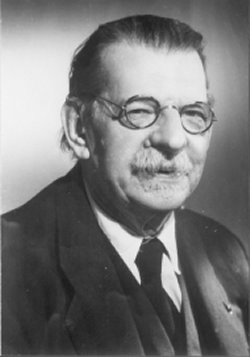
Candidate	Charles de Gaulle	Georges Marrane	Albert Châtelet
Party	UNR	PCF	UFD
Electoral vote	62,394	10,355	6,721
Percentage	78.51%	13.03%	8.46%
President before election
René Coty
CNIP
Elected President
Charles de Gaulle
UNR

The 1958 French presidential election was the first held under the French Fifth Republic, on 21 December. It was the sole presidential election by electoral college (gathering the members of the French Parliament, the general councils, the overseas assemblies, as well as tens of thousands of mayors, deputy mayors and municipal councillors) under the Fifth Republic. To win, a candidate was required to receive over 50% of the vote. This system was used solely for this election, as it was abolished following a 1962 referendum.

Charles de Gaulle, who became President of the Council of Ministers (Prime Minister) after the May 1958 crisis amid the Algerian War, won in a landslide victory in the first round of voting with 78.5% of the votes cast, against Georges Marrane of the French Communist Party and Albert Châtelet of the Union of Democratic Forces. De Gaulle took office on 8 January 1959; following the 1962 referendum, he established direct universal suffrage for presidential elections, starting in 1965, which saw him win reelection to a second term.

== Background ==
The election took place during the Algerian War and after the May 1958 crisis, which led to General Charles de Gaulle's return to power. On June 1, 1958, after having been President of the Provisional Government of the French Republic at the end of the Second World War, "the General", at the request of President René Coty, became President of the Council of Ministers. Three months later, at the end of September, he had the Constitution of the Fifth Republic adopted by referendum, with 82.6% of "yes" votes.

The conditions for General de Gaulle's return to power - the investiture of his government by the National Assembly in a context of high tension - were denounced by a section of the left, notably the French Communist Party (PCF), which saw it as a "coup d'état". The Radical Party and the French Section of the Workers' International (SFIO) entered the government, with the socialist leader Guy Mollet being Minister of State, but opposition to support for de Gaulle within these parties quickly led to schisms. This is how the coalition of the Union of the Democratic Forces (UFD) was created, which brought together figures such as Pierre Mendès France, a radical dissident, and François Mitterrand (UDSR).

The vote also took place during the Cold War. As such, the PCF, the leading party in France after the Second World War were concerned the public opinion was increasingly rejecting the Eastern Bloc and appeared to be losing momentum while systematically supporting the USSR.

The legislative elections of November 1958 were marked by a victory for the Gaullist right and by a historic decline in the number of left-wing deputies, notably communists - only 10 were elected, a great loss from the 150 elected in 1956. With less than 2% of the votes, the UFD did not obtain any seats.

== Terms ==
Article 6 of the 1958 Constitution indicates that the President of the Republic is elected for seven years "by an electoral college comprising members of Parliament, general councils and assemblies of overseas territories, as well as elected representatives of municipal councils", the latter differing according to the size of the municipalities. The two-round majority single-member constituency system is retained by article 7.

Due to the large number of sparsely populated communes in France, the electoral college mainly favours rural areas or the "France du seigle et de la châtaigne" (France of rye and chestnuts), according to the expression of Georges Vedel. Indeed, communes with fewer than 4,000 inhabitants have three times more delegates than towns with more than 100,000 inhabitants.

The order of the November 7, 1958 organic law specifies the voting procedures. It provides that candidates must have collected, at least twelve days before the first round, 50 signatures from the electoral college. These electors vote in the capital of their department of election. If no candidate has obtained the majority of votes cast, a second round is planned within eight days.

The choice not to impose direct universal suffrage resulted from a compromise with the opponents of de Gaulle, who feared too great a break with the Fourth Republic. Furthermore, the French colonial Empire was expected to vote almost exclusively for the General, which predestined the latter to extremely high scores in the colonies if direct universal suffrage had been chosen.

== Candidates ==
On December 13, 1958, when a duel between the right (Charles de Gaulle) and the communist left (Georges Marrane) was expected, the Provisional Constitutional Commission (Constitutional Council) announced that Albert Châtelet, honorary dean of the Paris Faculty of Sciences, had also gathered the necessary signatures to run. This candidacy, submitted just before the deadline on the initiative of Daniel Mayer, was supported by the UFD, which stated that it “opposed the dangerous simplification that tends to present French politics as a battle between two blocs.”

Candidate and political party / coalition	Main political function during the campaign	Comments
Albert Châtelet (75 years old) Union of Democratic Forces (UFD)	President of the Audin Committee (since 1957)	While François Mitterrand and Pierre Mendès France refused to run in the presidential election, Albert Châtelet, a mathematician and academic, was nominated as the candidate of the UFD, a non-communist left-wing coalition opposed to the return to power of General de Gaulle. Close to the ideas of the Radical Party, in favor of Franco- Soviet friendship and hostile to the Algerian War, Albert Châtelet entered politics after the crisis of May 1958 and campaigned for a "no" vote in the constitutional referendum .
Charles de Gaulle (68 years old) Union for the New Republic (UNR)	President of the Council of Ministers (since 1958)	Basking in his prestige as leader of Free France during the Second World War, General de Gaulle was the clear favourite in the election. After serving as President of the Provisional Government of the French Republic from 1944 to 1946, he experienced a "crossing of the desert" until the Algiers Putsch and the resulting crisis. It was in this context that he returned to power by becoming President of the council. He then had the Constitution of the Fifth Republic drafted and approved by referendum.
Georges Marrane (70 years old) French Communist Party (PCF)	Mayor of Ivry-sur-Seine (since 1945)	Since 1925, Georges Marrane has been elected in the department of Seine, where he was for a time president of the general council, senator and deputy until his defeat in the legislative elections of 1958. He was briefly Minister of Public Health and Population in the first Ramadier government, in 1947, resigning following the ousting of the communist ministers.

== Campaign ==
The academic Jean-François Condette sums up the situation of the two candidates facing Charles de Gaulle as follows: "Georges Marrane is identified by his political label, the designated representative of the communist danger who, in the midst of the Cold War, must serve as a foil. Albert Châtelet, for his part, is presented as 'the dean', a respectable but outdated figure, an academic lost in politics" .

The fact that Charles de Gaulle was the clear favorite due to his prestige and his position, as well as the voting method, did not give rise to an intense or media-heavy campaign. Albert Châtelet, while believing that "de Gaulle and the communists contain the seeds of civil war", refused to campaign, recognizing that his candidacy was "symbolic and principled".

== Results ==
Results of the 1958 French presidential election
Candidates	Parties	First round	
Candidates	Parties	Voice	%
Charles de Gaulle	UNR	62,394	78.51
Georges Marrane	PCF	10,355	13.03
Albert Châtelet	UFD	6,721	8.46
Votes cast		79,470	97.76
Blank or invalid votes		1,820	2.24
Total voters		81,290	100
Abstention		474	0.58
Registered / Participation		81,764	99.42

=== Analysis ===
As widely predicted, General de Gaulle easily obtained an absolute majority of the votes cast, which did not require a second round. In Metropolitan France alone (i.e., excluding Algeria and the overseas territories), the 74,391 votes cast were distributed as follows: 77.5% for the winner, 13.6% for Georges Marrane and 8.9% for Albert Châtelet .

Although the President of the Council won in all the departments, his victory was not considered humiliating for his opponents. The communist candidate achieved his best scores in his party's strongholds, particularly Nord-Pas-de-Calais, while Albert Châtelet came second in 39 metropolitan departments, notably in the socialist and radical strongholds located in the south of France.

== See also ==
- List of indirect presidential elections in France
- President of France
- Politics of France
- French presidential elections under the Fifth Republic
- Presidency of Charles de Gaulle
