= 1960s in France =

France emerged from World War II in the 1960s, rebuilding the country physically and the nation's national identity through the French Fifth Republic. Under the leadership of President Charles de Gaulle (1959–1969), France regained its great power status.

== 1958–62: Founding of the Fifth Republic ==
In the November 1958 elections, de Gaulle and his supporters (initially organised in the Union pour la Nouvelle République-Union Démocratique du Travail, then the Union des Démocrates pour la Vème République, and later still the Union des Démocrates pour la République, UDR) won a comfortable majority. In December, de Gaulle was elected President by the electoral college with 78% of the vote, and inaugurated in January 1959.

He oversaw tough economic measures to revitalize the country, including the issuing of a new franc (worth 100 old francs). Internationally, he rebuffed both the United States and the Soviet Union, pushing for an independent France with its own nuclear weapons, and strongly encouraged a "Free Europe," believing that a confederation of all European nations would restore the past glories of the great European empires. He set about building Franco-German cooperation as the cornerstone of the European Economic Community (EEC), paying the first state visit to Germany by a French head of state since Napoleon. In 1963, Germany and France signed a treaty of friendship, the Élysée Treaty. France also reduced its dollar reserves, trading them for gold from the U.S. government, thereby reducing America's economic influence abroad.

On 23 November 1959 in a speech in Strasbourg, de Gaulle announced his vision for Europe:

Oui, c'est l'Europe, depuis l'Atlantique jusqu'à l'Oural, c'est toute l'Europe, qui décidera du destin du monde.

("Yes, it is Europe, from the Atlantic to the Urals, it is Europe, it is the whole of Europe, that will decide the destiny of the world")

His expression, "Europe, from the Atlantic to the Urals," has often been cited throughout the history of European integration. It became, for the next ten years, de Gaulle's favorite political rallying cry. His vision stood in contrast to the Atlanticism of the United States, Britain and NATO, preferring instead a Europe that would act as a third pole between the United States and the Soviet Union. By including in his ideal of Europe all the territory up to the Urals, de Gaulle was implicitly offering détente to the Soviets, while his phrase was also interpreted as excluding the United Kingdom from a future Europe.

He vetoed the British application to join the EEC in 1963, because he thought that the United Kingdom lacked the political will to join the community. Many Britons took de Gaulle's "non" as an insult, especially with the role the United Kingdom had played in the Liberation of France only 19 years earlier.

De Gaulle believed that while the war in Algeria was militarily winnable, it was not defensible internationally, and he became reconciled to the colony's eventual independence. This stance greatly angered the French settlers and their metropolitan supporters, and de Gaulle was forced to suppress two uprisings in Algeria by French settlers and troops, in the second of which (the Generals' Putsch in April 1961) France herself was threatened with invasion by rebel paratroops. De Gaulle's government also covered up the Paris massacre of 1961, issued under the orders of the police prefect Maurice Papon. He was also targeted by the settler Organisation armée secrète (OAS) terrorist group and several assassination attempts were made on him; the most famous is that of 22 August 1962, when he and his wife narrowly escaped an assassination attempt when their Citroën DS was targeted by machine gun fire arranged by Jean-Marie Bastien-Thiry in Petit-Clamart. After a referendum on Algerian self-determination carried out in 1961, de Gaulle arranged a cease-fire in Algeria with the March 1962 Évian Accords, legitimated by another referendum a month later. Algeria became independent in July 1962, while an amnesty was later issued covering all crimes committed during the war, including the use of torture. In just a few months in 1962, 900,000 French settlers left the country The exodus accelerated after the 5th of July 1962 massacre.

In September 1962, de Gaulle sought a constitutional amendment to allow the president to be directly elected by the people and issued another referendum to this end, approved by more than three-fifths of voters despite a broad "coalition of no" formed by most of the parties, opposed to a presidential regime. After a motion of censure voted by the Parliament on 4 October 1962 de Gaulle dissolved the National Assembly and held new elections. Although the left progressed, the Gaullists won an increased majority, despite opposition from the Christian democratic Popular Republican Movement and the National Centre of Independents and Peasants (CNIP) who criticized de Gaulle's euroscepticism and presidentialism. Although the government settled the Algerian issue, Prime Minister Michel Debré resigned over the final settlement and Georges Pompidou replaced him.

== 1962–68: Politics of grandeur ==
With the Algerian conflict behind him, de Gaulle achieved his two main objectives: to reform and develop the French economy, and to promote an independent foreign policy and a strong stance on the international stage. This was, as named by foreign observers, the "politics of grandeur" (politique de grandeur).

== "Thirty glorious years" ==
In the context of a population boom unseen in France since the 18th century, the government under prime minister Georges Pompidou oversaw a rapid transformation and expansion of the French economy. With dirigisme — a combination of capitalism and state-directed economy — the government intervened heavily in the economy, using indicative five-year plans as its main tool.

High-profile projects, mostly but not always financially successful, were launched: the extension of Marseille harbor (soon ranking third in Europe and first in the Mediterranean); the promotion of the Caravelle passenger jetliner (a predecessor of Airbus); the decision to start building the supersonic Franco-British Concorde airliner in Toulouse; the expansion of the French auto industry with state-owned Renault at its center; and the building of the first motorways between Paris and the provinces.

With these projects, the French economy recorded growth rates unrivaled since the 19th century. In 1963, de Gaulle vetoed Britain's entry into the EEC for the first of two times. In 1964, for the first time in 200 years, France's GDP overtook that of the United Kingdom, a position it held until the 1990s. This period is still remembered in France with some nostalgia as the peak of the Trente Glorieuses ("Thirty Glorious Years" of economic growth between 1945 and 1974).

== Fourth nuclear power ==
This strong economic foundation enabled de Gaulle to implement his independent foreign policy. In 1960, France became the fourth state to acquire a nuclear arsenal, detonating an atomic bomb in the Algerian desert (a secret clause of the 1962 Évian Accords with the Algerian National Liberation Front stated that "Algeria concede... to France the use of certain air bases, terrains, sites and military installations which are necessary to it [France]" during five years.) In 1968, at the insistence of de Gaulle, French scientists finally succeeded in detonating a hydrogen bomb without American assistance. In what was regarded as a snub to Britain, de Gaulle declared France to be the third big independent nuclear power, as Britain's nuclear force was closely coordinated with that of the United States.

While grandeur was surely an essential motive in these nuclear developments, another was the concern that the U.S., involved in an unpopular and costly war in Vietnam, would hesitate to intervene in Europe should the Soviet Union decide to invade. De Gaulle wanted to develop an independent force de frappe. An additional effect was that the French military, which had been demoralized and close to rebellion after the loss of Algeria, was kept busy. In 1965, France launched its first satellite into orbit, being the third country in the world to build a complete delivery system, after the Soviet Union and the United States.

== China ==
De Gaulle was convinced that a strong and independent France could act as a balancing force between the United States and the Soviet Union, a policy seen as little more than posturing and opportunism by his critics, particularly in Britain and the United States, to which France was formally allied. In January 1964, he officially recognized the People's Republic of China, despite the opposition of the U.S. government. Eight years later U.S. President Richard Nixon visited the PRC and began normalizing relations.

Nixon's first foreign visit after his election was to France in 1969. He and de Gaulle both shared the same non-Wilsonian approach to world affairs, believing in nations and their relative strengths, rather than in ideologies, international organizations, or multilateral agreements. De Gaulle is famously known for calling the United Nations le Machin ("the thing").

== Second round ==
In December 1965, de Gaulle returned as president for a second seven-year term, but this time he had to go through a second round of voting in which he defeated François Mitterrand. In February 1966, France withdrew from the common NATO military command, but remained within the organization. He also declared that all foreign military forces had to leave French territory, giving them one year to redeploy.

In September 1966, in a famous speech in Phnom Penh (Cambodia), he expressed France's disapproval of U.S. involvement in the Vietnam War, calling for a U.S. withdrawal from Vietnam as the only way to ensure peace. As the Vietnam War had its roots in French colonialism in southeast Asia, this speech did little to endear de Gaulle to the Americans, even if they later came to the same conclusion.

== Empty Chair Crisis ==
During the establishment of the European Community, de Gaulle helped precipitate one of the greatest crises in the history of the EC, the Empty Chair Crisis. It involved the financing of the Common Agricultural Policy, but almost more importantly the use of qualified majority voting in the EC (as opposed to unanimity). In June 1965, after France and the other five members could not agree, de Gaulle withdrew France's representatives from the EC. Their absence left the organization essentially unable to run its affairs until the Luxembourg compromise was reached in January 1966. De Gaulle managed to make qualified voting majority (QVM) mechanism essentially meaningless for years to come, and halted more federalist plans for the EC, which he opposed.

== Six-Day War ==
Having vetoed Britain's entry into the EEC a second time, in June 1967, he condemned the Israelis for their occupation of the West Bank and Gaza following the Six-Day War, saying "Israel is organizing, on the territories which it has taken, an occupation which cannot work without oppression, repression and expulsions - and if there appears resistance to this, it will in turn be called 'terrorism'." This was a major change in French policy. Until then, France had been a staunch ally, helping Israel militarily and jointly planning the Suez Campaign in 1956.

Under de Gaulle, following the independence of Algeria, France embarked on foreign policies more favorable to the Arab side, still a distinct aspect of French foreign policy today. Israel's leadership, stung by what it considered its capricious abandonment, turned towards the United States for military support. However, de Gaulle supported the principle of a just settlement for both the Arab and Jewish refugees of the Middle East within the framework of the United Nations. This was stated upon the adoption of UN Resolution 242, in his press conference of 27 November 1967 and contained in his letter to David Ben-Gurion dated 9 January 1968.

== Nigerian Civil War ==
During Nigeria's civil war of 1967–1970, de Gaulle's government supported the Republic of Biafra in its struggle to gain independence from Nigeria. Despite lack of official recognition, de Gaulle provided covert military assistance through France's former African colonies. The United Kingdom opposed de Gaulle's stance, but he viewed the political position of the Igbo in Nigeria as analogous to that of the French Québécois living in Canada.

== Vive le Québec libre! ==
In July 1967, de Gaulle visited Canada, then-celebrating its centennial with a world's fair, Expo 67. On 24 July, speaking to a large crowd from a balcony at Montreal's city hall, de Gaulle uttered Vive le Québec ! (Long live Quebec!) then added, Vive le Québec libre ! (Long live free Quebec!). Canadian media outlets strongly criticized the statement, and the Prime Minister of Canada, Lester B. Pearson, a soldier who had fought in World War I and a Nobel Peace Prize winner, stated that "Canadians do not need to be liberated." De Gaulle left Canada of his own accord the next day without proceeding to Ottawa as scheduled. He never returned to Canada. The speech caused outrage in most of Canada and led to a serious diplomatic rift between the two countries. However, the event was seen as a watershed moment by the Quebec sovereignty movement.

In December 1967, claiming continental European solidarity, he again rejected British entry into the European Economic Community. Many have commented that the "policy of grandeur" was probably too ambitious and heavy for the shoulders of France. This policy, it is argued, was only made possible by de Gaulle's resolve, and was not sustainable in the long run. In any case, it is still remembered in France as a defining era of modern French foreign policy, and it still largely inspires policy to this day.

== May 1968 ==
De Gaulle's government was criticized within France, particularly for its heavy-handed style. While the written press and elections were free, the state had a monopoly on television and radio broadcasts (though there were private stations broadcasting from abroad; see ORTF) and the executive occasionally told public broadcasters the bias that they desired on news. In many respects, society was traditionalist and repressive. Many factors contributed to a general weariness of sections of the public, particularly the student youth, which led to the events of May 1968.

The huge demonstrations and strikes in France in May 1968 severely challenged de Gaulle's legitimacy. He briefly fled to Baden-Baden and met Massu, then French commander in Germany (to discuss possible army intervention against the protesters, according to popular unofficial accounts).

In a private meeting discussing the students' and workers' demands for direct participation in business and government he coined the phrase "La réforme oui, la chienlit non," politely translated as 'reform yes, masquerade/chaos no.' It was a vernacular scatological pun meaning 'chie-en-lit, no'. The term is now common parlance in French political commentary, used both critically and ironically referring back to de Gaulle.

De Gaulle offered to accept some of the reforms the demonstrators sought. He again considered a referendum to support his moves, but Pompidou persuaded him to dissolve parliament (in which the government had all but lost its majority in the March 1967 elections) and hold new elections instead. The June 1968 elections were a major success for the Gaullists and their allies; when shown the specter of revolution or even civil war, the majority of the country rallied to him. His party won 358 of 487 seats. Maurice Couve de Murville replaced Pompidou in July.

== Retirement and death ==
De Gaulle resigned on 29 April 1969, following the defeat of his referendum to transform the Senate into an advisory body while giving extended powers to regional councils. Some said the referendum was a self-conscious political suicide committed by de Gaulle after the traumatizing events of May 1968.
