= UFD =

UFD may refer to:

- Union of the Democratic Forces (France), a defunct electoral coalition (French: Union des forces démocratiques)
- Unique factorization domain, in abstract algebra
- United Front Department, a North Korean government body
- Upfield railway station, Melbourne
- Ural Federal District, Russia
- USB flash drive, in computing
- Ultra faint dwarf, a type of dwarf spheroidal galaxy
