= Presidential elections in France =

The president of France (ex officio also a co-prince of Andorra) is elected by direct popular vote to a five-year term. If the office falls vacant before the end of five years, an election to a new five-year term is held, generally within 20 to 35 days of the vacancy.

In France, constitution mandates that presidents cannot be elected for more than two consecutive five-year terms.

The presidential term was set at five years beginning with the 2002 election. In elections held from 1965 until 1995, the president was elected to a seven-year term. Elections are always held on a Sunday. Candidates appear on the ballot after the Constitutional Council has validated their candidacy. Should no candidate receive over 50% of the vote in the first round, a second round is organised two weeks later with the top two contenders.

For their candidacy to be validated, candidates must secure a minimum of 500 endorsements (popularly known in France as the "500 signatures") from elected officials, who may include mayors, members of the parliament, regional and departmental councillors, as well as members of the assemblies of Corsica and the overseas. The endorsements must come from at least 30 different departments or overseas collectivities, with no more than 10% coming from the same department or overseas collectivity. Each official may endorse only one candidate. The number of required endorsements was originally 100, but it was raised to 500 in 1976.

Candidates in presidential elections in France have the right to visit French military bases on national soil and abroad to gain a better understanding of the French Armed Forces, although they are prohibited from using such visits for campaign events. Depending on their respective results in the election, they are eligible to different modalities of reimbursement of their campaign expenses by the state. The state also monitors appearances on television and radio programmes through its Regulatory Authority for Audiovisual and Digital Communication (ARCOM) to ensure equal airtime between candidates during the campaign; each candidate has the right to a certain amount of time not to be exceeded per media platform.

== History ==
=== Second Republic ===
There was one presidential election in France during the government known as the Second Republic (1848–1851). It was held in 1848. The president was elected by direct popular vote.

=== Third Republic ===
There were 15 presidential elections in France during the government known as the Third Republic (1870–1940).

According to the Constitutional Laws of 1875, the President was elected by an absolute majority of votes by the two houses of the Parliament assembled at the National Assembly.

=== Fourth Republic ===
There were two presidential elections in France during the republican government known as the Fourth Republic (1946–1958). They were held in 1947 and 1953.

The president was elected by the Congress of the French Parliament, a joint meeting of both houses of the French Parliament (the National Assembly and the Council of the Republic).

=== Fifth Republic ===
There have been twelve presidential elections in France since the establishment of the Fifth Republic in 1958.

Originally the president was elected by an electoral college comprising the members of French Parliament, the general councils and the assemblies of the overseas territories, as well as the elected representatives of the municipal councils. This electoral college included around 80,000 departmental and municipal councillors (who had been elected locally).

Following constitutional reform in November 1962 (the constitutional Act of 6 November) pushed by President Charles de Gaulle, the president has been directly elected by the people of France in a two-round election.

Until a 24 September 2000 constitutional referendum, the president had been elected for a seven-year term since 1958. With the referendum being successful, the term was reduced to five years. Therefore once the winner of the 2002 election, Jacques Chirac, took office as president, the next election was scheduled for 2007 rather than 2009. The French constitutional law of 23 July 2008 proposed by President Nicolas Sarkozy following an election pledge introduced term limits. No president can be reelected to a third consecutive term; any president can however run for a third term after having left office.

Currently, the President of the French Republic is elected to a five-year term in a two-round election under Article 7 of the Constitution: if no candidate secures an absolute majority (including blank and void ballots) of votes in the first round, a second round is held two weeks later between the two candidates who received the most votes. As of 2022 every election since the direct election system was introduced has gone to a second round.

The most recent election took place in 2022, with the first round being held on 10 April and the second round on 24 April.

== See also ==
- Elections in France
- Politics of France
