= Algiers putsch (disambiguation) =

The Algiers putsch can be one of the three historical military coups d'état that happened in French Algeria's capital -then second to Paris as most populated French city- in different contexts;

== World War II (1939–1945) ==
- Algiers putsch of 1942 on November 8, 1942, a Free French resistance uprising against Vichy French administration

== Algerian War (1954–1962) ==
- Algiers putsch of 1958 on May 13, 1958, supporting retired General Charles de Gaulle
- Algiers putsch of 1961 on April 21, 1961, against Fifth French Republic President Charles de Gaulle
