= 1965 French presidential election =

- 5 December 1965 (first round); 19 December 1965 (second round)
- Turnout: 84.75% (first round); 84.32% (second round)
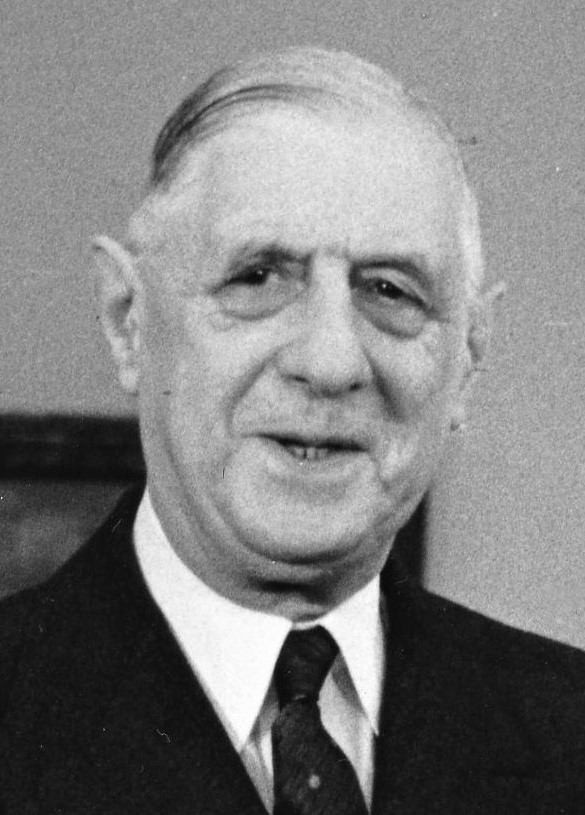

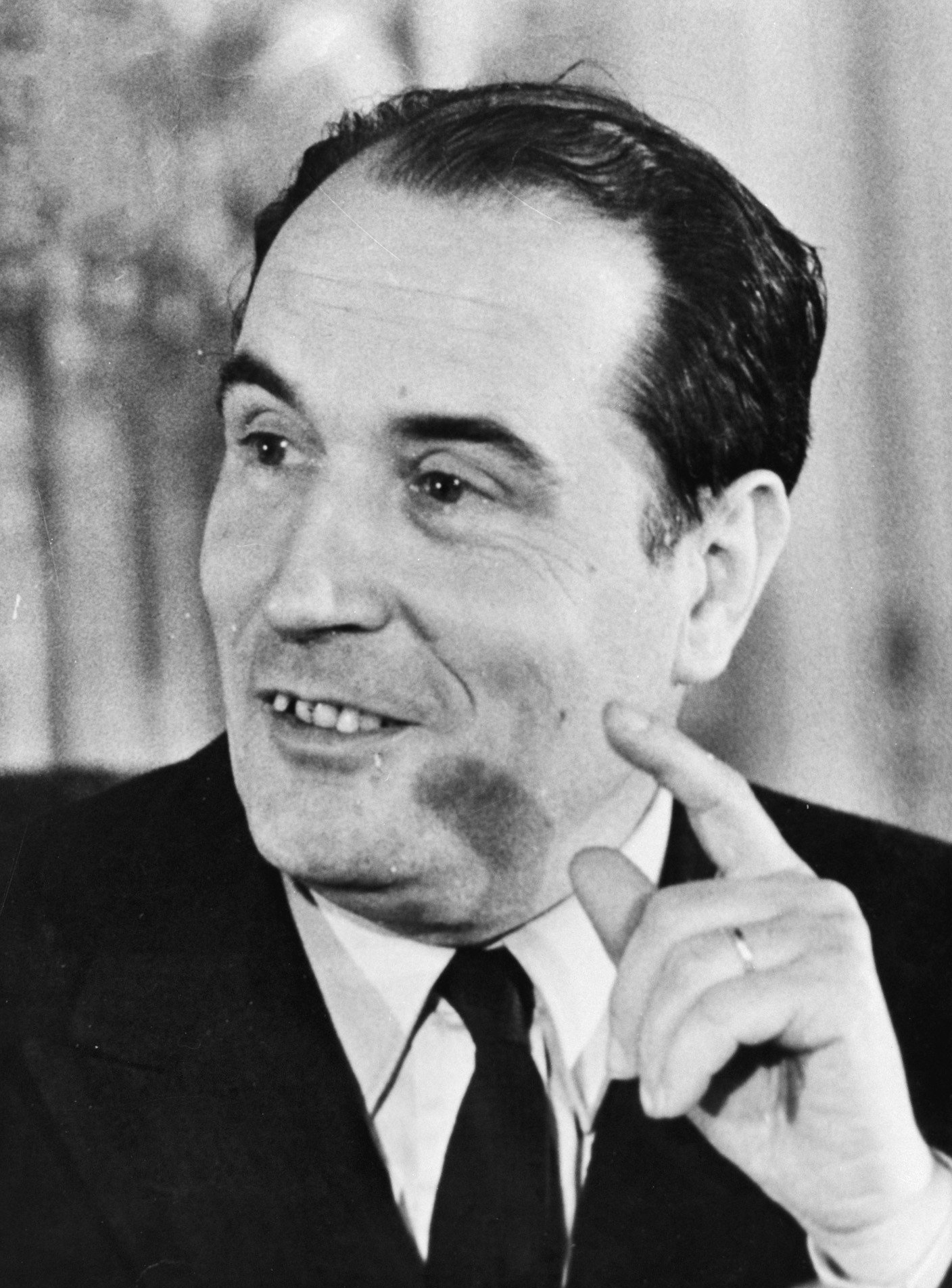
Candidate	Charles de Gaulle	François Mitterrand
Party	UNR	FGDS
Popular vote	13,083,699	10,619,735
Percentage	55.20%	44.80%
President before election
Charles de Gaulle
UNR
Elected President
Charles de Gaulle
UNR

Presidential elections were held in France on 5 December 1965, with a second round on 19 December. They were the first direct presidential elections in the Fifth Republic and the first since the Second Republic in 1848. It had been widely expected that incumbent president Charles de Gaulle would be re-elected, but the election was notable for the unexpectedly strong performance of his left-wing challenger and future president François Mitterrand.

== Background ==
This was the second presidential election since the beginning of the Fifth Republic. Under the first draft of the 1958 constitution, the president was to be elected by an electoral college, in order to appease concerns about de Gaulle's allegedly authoritarian or Bonapartist tendencies. There had been a historical reluctance in France to have a directly elected president, because Louis-Napoléon Bonaparte (the winner of the 1848 presidential election) had seized power in the 1851 coup d'état, before the end of his term. However, a direct presidential election had always been essential to de Gaulle's political vision, and he had it adopted by the 1962 referendum.

== Candidates ==
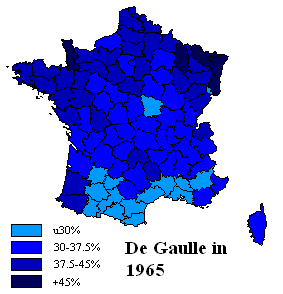
% of vote for Charles de Gaulle, first round

When the electoral campaign started, the majority of political commentators believed that de Gaulle would succeed in winning re-election in a single round. Many of the leaders of the opposition parties were therefore reluctant to challenge de Gaulle. Furthermore, some potential candidates such as former Prime Minister Pierre Mendès-France declined to run, due to their opposition to direct presidential elections. De Gaulle did not expect a significant challenger, announced his candidacy only one month before the first round of voting, and did not lead a very active campaign.

The centre-left paper L'Express campaigned for the nomination of a candidate of the non-Communist opposition. One potential challenger identified was Gaston Defferre, Mayor of Marseille and an internal opponent of the then leader of the French Section of the Workers' International (SFIO, socialist party), Guy Mollet. In his municipality, Defferre led a coalition composed of the SFIO, the Radical Party, and the centre-right Popular Republican Movement (MRP). Nevertheless, the leaders of these parties refused to support his candidacy.

The failure of Defferre's candidacy led to other politicians entering the race. The MRP leader Jean Lecanuet was nominated by his party and the National Centre of Independents and Peasants (CNIP) to represent the centre. He ran a liberal and pro-European campaign, influenced by John F. Kennedy, and criticizing the "archaism" and the "nationalism" of de Gaulle in a bid to rally younger and more moderate conservatives.

François Mitterrand, a former Fourth Republic minister who did not belong to any party, offered to run as the sole candidate of the left. Mitterrand had been an opponent to de Gaulle since 1958 (like the Communists but contrary to the SFIO leadership) and had written the book The Permanent Coup d'État, strongly criticising de Gaulle's policies. He obtained the support from several left-wing parties, including the French Communist Party (PCF), which wished to get out of its isolation.

== Results ==
Despite running a somewhat lacklustre campaign, de Gaulle won the first round by over three million votes. However, he came up short of a majority, forcing a runoff being held two weeks later, pitting him against Mitterrand. Tixier-Vignancour supported Mitterrand in the second round, Lecanuet called on his voters not to vote for de Gaulle. De Gaulle defeated Mitterrand by a decisive margin in the runoff. However, Mitterrand performed better than expected, one of the first warnings that de Gaulle's popularity was waning.

De Gaulle retained his Prime Minister Georges Pompidou but decided to carry out a cabinet reshuffle. He dismissed his Economy Minister Valéry Giscard d'Estaing, thus damaging relations in the majority coalition with Giscard's party, the Independent Republicans, the last allies of the Gaullists.

Candidate	Party	First round		Second round	
Candidate	Party	Votes	%	Votes	%
Charles de Gaulle (incumbent)	Union for the New Republic	10,828,521	44.65	13,083,699	55.20
François Mitterrand	Federation of the Democratic and Socialist Left	7,694,005	31.72	10,619,735	44.80
Jean Lecanuet	Popular Republican Movement	3,777,120	15.57		
Jean-Louis Tixier-Vignancour	Tixier-Vignancour Committees	1,260,208	5.20		
Pierre Marcilhacy	European Liberal Party	415,017	1.71		
Marcel Barbu	Miscellaneous left	279,685	1.15		
Total		24,254,556	100.00	23,703,434	100.00
Valid votes		24,254,556	98.99	23,703,434	97.26
Invalid/blank votes		248,360	1.01	668,213	2.74
Total votes		24,502,916	100.00	24,371,647	100.00
Registered voters/turnout		28,910,581	84.75	28,902,704	84.32
Source: Constitutional Court

== See also ==
- President of France
- Politics of France
- French presidential elections under the Fifth Republic
- Presidency of Charles de Gaulle
