= Marcel Barbu =

French politician

Marcel Barbu (October 17, 1907 – November 7, 1984) was a French politician.

== Background and earlier life ==
Born in Nanterre, Hauts-de-Seine, Barbu was deported to Buchenwald concentration camp during the Second World War. Barbu won election in 1945 in the Drôme for a small left-wing party.

== French presidential candidate ==
In the 1965 French presidential election he ran as an independent candidate and obtained 1.15% of the votes. Barbu claimed to have been mistreated by the press and establishment, and wept at the end of one of his speeches. He is remembered as the candidate of the chiens battus or beaten dogs.

Barbu is remembered as one of a number of widely diverse candidates — from both left and right — who stood against Charles de Gaulle in 1965.

== Death ==
He died in 1984.
