= Jacques Riguet =

French mathematician, developed calculus of relations (1921 to 2013)

Jacques Riguet (1921 to October 20, 2013) was a French mathematician known for his contributions to algebraic logic and category theory. According to Gunther Schmidt and Thomas Ströhlein, "Alfred Tarski and Jacques Riguet founded the modern calculus of relations".

== Career ==
Already at his lycée, Riguet was impressed by the power of logical reasoning in geometry. He studied Louis Couturat and Bourbaki, who made contributions to logic and set theory. Riguet studied higher mathematics with Albert Châtelet and was introduced to lattices. In 1948 he published "Relations binaires, fermetures, correspondances de Galois" which revived the calculus of binary relations.

He published his thesis Fondements de la Theorie de Relations Binaires in October 1951. In 1954 Riguet gave a plenary address at the International Congress of Mathematicians in Amsterdam, speaking on the applications of binary relations to algebra and machine theory. For a time, Riguet attended the seminary of Jacques Lacan.

Riguet was employed at Centre national de la recherche scientifique until 1957.

== Relations ==
In Riguet's work the composition of relations is the basis for characterizing relations, replacing the element-wise descriptions that use logical formulations. For example, he described the Schröder rules. His work was reviewed in Journal of Symbolic Logic by Øystein Ore.

Some of Riguet’s contributions can be described using structure of the logical matrix associated with a relation. If u and v are logical vectors, then their logical outer product produces the associated logical matrix $u_i \land v_j .$ Riguet calls the associated relation a rectangular relation, and if it happens to be symmetric it is a square relation.

In 1950 he submitted "Sur les ensembles reguliers de relations binaires", and an article on difunctional relations, those with logical matrix in a block diagonal form. The following year he provided an algebraic characterization of heterogeneous relations with a logical matrix comparable to a Ferrers diagram. Since Ferrers diagrams order the partitions of an integer, Riguet extended order theory beyond relations restricted to one set.

In 1954 Riguet described the extension of the calculus of binary relations to a calculus of Boolean matrices.

== Category theory ==
In 1958 Riguet went to Zurich, working with IBM, studying category theory. He published the following papers on that topic:

- 1962: "Programmation et theorie des categories", in Proceedings of Symposium on Symbolic Languages and Data Processing, Rome (1961), pp 88–98, Gordon & Breach
- 1973: "Probabilites et theorie de la decision du point de vue de la theorie des categories" (Amiens colloquium) Cahiers de Topologie et Géométrie Différentielle Catégoriques 14(2)
- 1975 : "Theorie des jeux et funciones de Grundy du point de vue de la theorie des categories" (TAC-Chantilly) Cahiers de Topologie et Géométrie Différentielle Catégoriques 16(4) : 441
- 1989 : "Galois correspondences in category theory", Hesselberg-Combinatorics
- 1992: (with Rene Guitart) Enveloppe Karoubienne et categorie de Kleisli, Cahiers de Topologie et Géométrie Différentielle Catégoriques 33(3) : 261–6, via Numdam.org

Riguet participated in the Séminaire Itinérant des Catégories.
