= Jacques Soustelle =

French politician

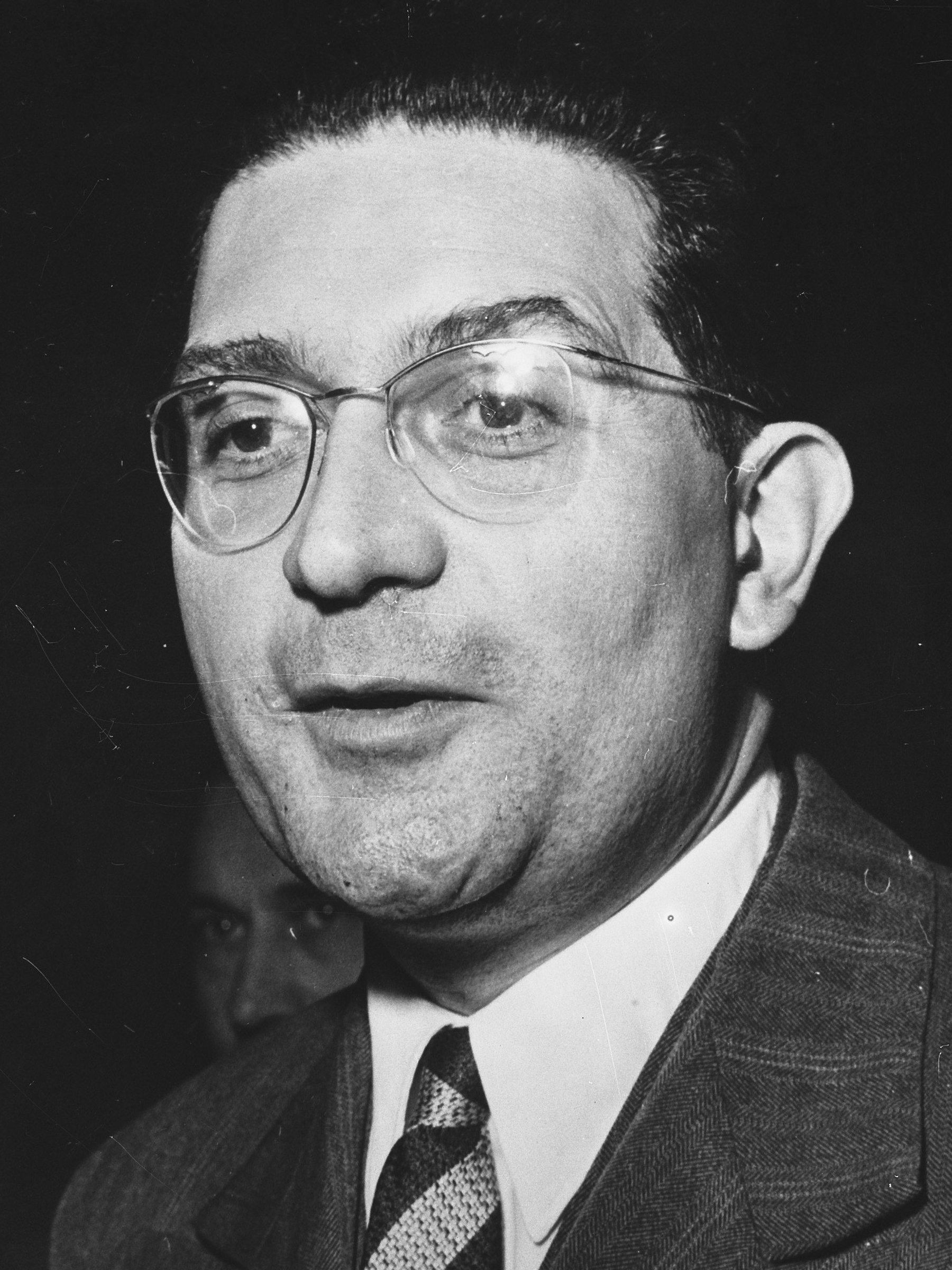
- Jacques Soustelle in 1958
- Born: 3 February 1912; Montpellier, France
- Died: 6 August 1990 (aged 78); Neuilly-sur-Seine, France
- Education: Lycée du Parc
- Alma mater: École normale supérieure
- Known for: Member of the Académie française
- Spouse: Georgette Fagot

Jacques Soustelle (French pronunciation: [ʒak sustɛl]; 3 February 1912 – 6 August 1990) was an important and early figure of the Free French Forces, a politician who served in the French National Assembly and at one time served as Governor General of Algeria, an anthropologist specializing in Pre-Columbian civilizations, and vice-director of the Musée de l'Homme in Paris in 1939. Soustelle and his followers opposed any compromise with anticolonial activists in Algeria in the Algerian War.

As Governor-General of Algeria, he helped the rise of Charles de Gaulle to the presidency of the Fifth Republic, but broke with De Gaulle over Algerian independence, joined the OAS in their efforts to overthrow De Gaulle and lived in exile between 1961 and 1968. On returning to France he resumed political and academic activity and was elected to the Académie française in 1983.

== Biography ==
Jacques Soustelle was born in Montpellier, into a Protestant working-class family. A brilliant high school student, he was admitted to the École Normale Supérieure de la rue d'Ulm. At the age of 20, he was admitted at the first place at the competitive exam of agrégation de philosophie (high-level grade for teaching). An anti-fascist, he was general-secretary in 1935 of the French Union of Intellectuals against Fascism.

=== Anthropology of Mesoamerica ===
Soustelle developed an interest in Ethnology while working at the Musée de l'Homme under Paul Rivet. Rivet sent him to Mexico, after Soustelle became an Agrégé, to study the Otomi people. Soustelle wrote his first major book Mexique, Terre Indienne (Mexico is Indian) about his time with the Otomi.

=== France Libre ===
After the Armistice of 22 June 1940, he left Mexico to join the Free French Forces (FFL) in London. Charles de Gaulle charged him with a diplomatic mission in Latin America (1941), to set up support committees for Free France, to cut short the diplomatic efforts of Petainists throughout the continent. He headed the intelligence service Bureau Central de Renseignements et d'Action (BCRA). He joined the Comité national français, (Government of the Free France, fighting Vichy France, and the Axis powers) in London, then ran the commissariat national à l’Information (1942).

Appointed to head the Special Services Branch (DGHS) in Algiers in (1943–1944) by the French Committee of National Liberation), He was Commissioner of the Republic (prefect) in Bordeaux then in the Liberation deputy of Mayenne. The name of the agency was changed on 26 October 1944, to DGER (Direction générale des études et recherches). As the organisation was characterised by numerous cases of nepotism, abuses and political feuds, Soustelle was removed from his position as Director.

=== Reconstruction of France ===
In 1945, he served first as Minister of Information, then as Minister of the Colonies. From 1947 to 1951, he served as Secretary General of the Gaullist party Rassemblement du Peuple Français (RPF) and was one De Gaulle's closest counsellors. Soustelle was a strong supporter of Israel. He was a chairman of the Franco-Israel Alliance, which campaigned for a closer military relationship between France and Israel.

=== Algeria ===
He was nominated Governor General of Algeria by Pierre Mendès France in 1955–56, favouring the integration of the Muslim community in the French Departments along the Mediterranean coast. Thanks to Soustelle's support during the May 1958 Algiers revolt, De Gaulle returned to power.

Though he believed he would become Algeria Secretary, Soustelle was only named Information Minister in June 1958. In 1959, he was appointed Minister of State in charge of Overseas Departments by De Gaulle. He was unharmed after three Front de Libération Nationale (FLN) members attempted to assassinate him by shooting his car on the Place de l'Étoile in Paris. He asked De Gaulle for a presidential pardon for the only attacker who had been arrested and sentenced to death. Soustelle disagreed with De Gaulle's sudden turn for Algerian independence. He analyzed this turnaround in his book L'Espérance trahie (Broken Hope). Soustelle was dismissed from the cabinet and the Gaullist party Union pour la nouvelle République (UNR) in 1960 and joined the terrorist Organisation armée secrète (OAS) in the fight against the independence of Algeria. When the OAS was replaced by the Conseil National de la Résistance (CNR), he joined this new organization with Georges Bidault, former President of the World War II National Council of the Resistance. His activities led his being sued for attempting to undermine the authority of the French state. He lived in exile between 1961 and his 1968 amnesty.

=== National Assembly ===
Soustelle was elected to France's National Assembly (France's lower House) three times, first representing Mayenne in 1945–46, then the Rhône (1951–58) as a Gaullist, and from 1973 to 1978 as a member of the centrist Mouvement Réformateur. In 1974, he supported the bill legalizing abortion presented by Simone Veil.

He died, aged 78, in Neuilly-sur-Seine.

== Honours ==
- Commandeur de la Légion d'honneur
- Médaille de la Résistance

== Selected publications ==
- La culture matérielle des Indiens Lacandons (1937)
- La famille otomi-pame du Mexique central (1937)
- Envers et contre tout: souvenirs et documents sur la France libre (1947, 1950)
- La vie quotidienne des Aztèques (1955)
- Aimée et souffrante Algérie (1956)
- Le drame algérien et la décadence française (1957)
- L'espérance trahie, 1958–1961 (1962)
- L'art du Mexique ancien (1966)
- Les quatre soleils: souvenirs et réflexion d'un ethnologue en Mexique (1967)
- La longue marche d'Israël (1968)
- Mexique, terre indienne (1971)
- Les Olmèques (1979)
- Lettre ouvert aux victimes de la decolonisation (1973)
- L'anthropologie française et les civilisations autochtones de l'Amérique (1989)

Cultural offices
Preceded by Pierre Gaxotte	Seat 36; Académie française 1983–1990	Succeeded by Jean-François Deniau
