= Valhuon =

- Commune
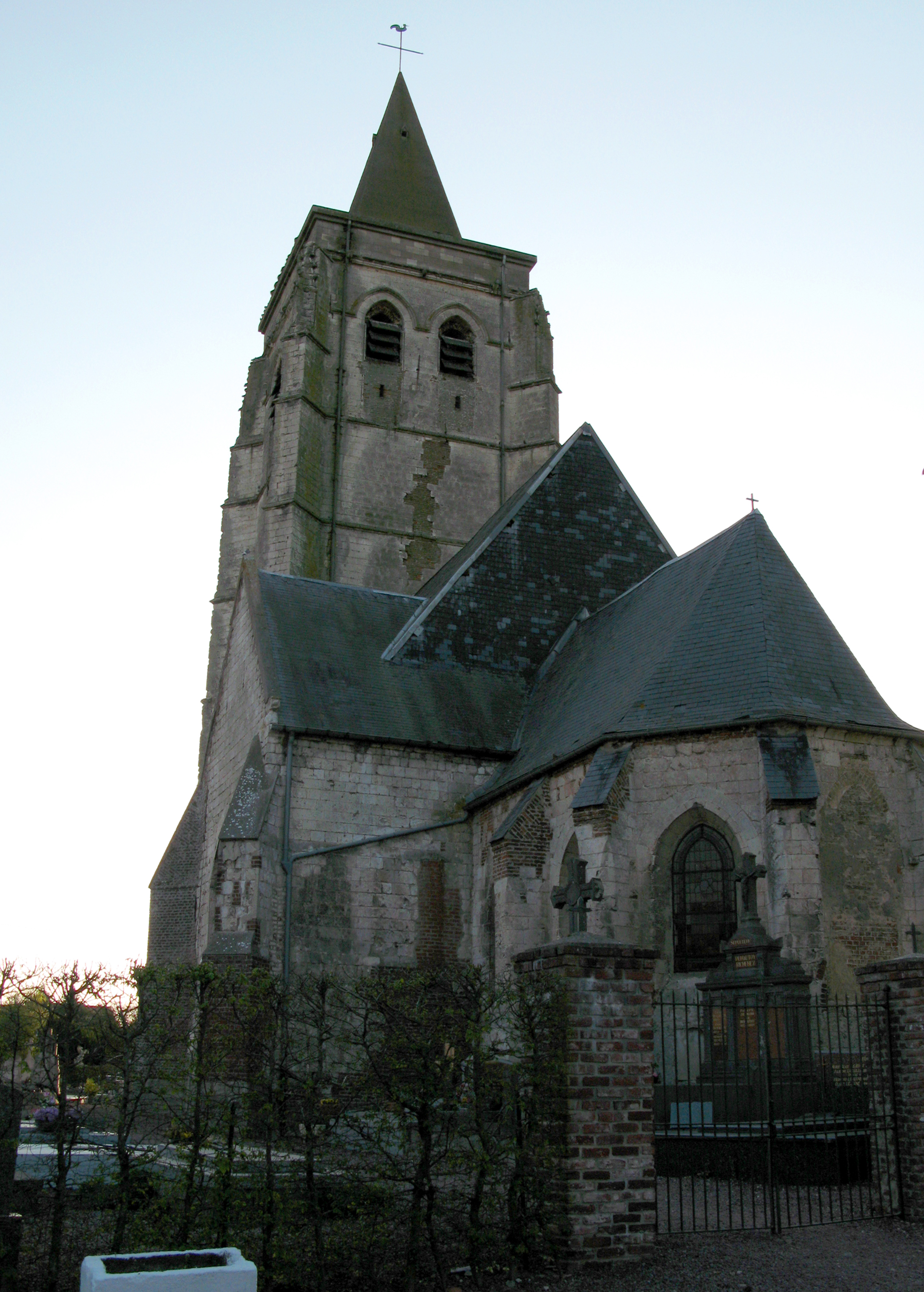
- The church of Valhuon

- Coat of arms
- Location of Valhuon
- Location within France Location within Hauts-de-France
- Coordinates: 50°26′05″N 2°22′41″E
- Country: France
- Region: Hauts-de-France
- Department: Pas-de-Calais
- Arrondissement: Arras
- Canton: Saint-Pol-sur-Ternoise
- Intercommunality: CC Ternois

Government
  - Mayor (2020–2026): Marie-Claude Pagerie
- Area^{1}: 9.17 km^{2} (3.54 sq mi)
- Elevation: 145 m (476 ft)
- Highest elevation: 167 m (548 ft)
- Lowest elevation: 118 m (387 ft)
- Population (2023): 538
  - Density: 58.7/km^{2} (152/sq mi)
- Time zone: UTC+01:00 (CET)
  - Summer (DST): UTC+02:00 (CEST)
- INSEE/Postal code: 62835 /62550
- ^{1} French Land Register data, which excludes lakes, ponds, glaciers > 1 km^{2} (0.386 sq mi or 247 acres) and river estuaries.

Valhuon (French pronunciation: [valɥɔ̃]) is a commune in the Pas-de-Calais department in the Hauts-de-France region of France 26 miles (42 km) northwest of Arras.

== Population ==
Historical population
Year	Pop.	±% p.a.
1968	529	—
1975	513	−0.44%
1982	545	+0.87%
1990	535	−0.23%
1999	469	−1.45%
2007	545	+1.90%
2012	580	+1.25%
2017	569	−0.38%
2023	538	−0.93%
Source: INSEE

== Notable person ==
- Albert Châtelet (1883–1960) politician and mathematician, was born in Valhuon

== See also ==
- Communes of the Pas-de-Calais department
