= Georges Marrane =

French politician (1888–1976)

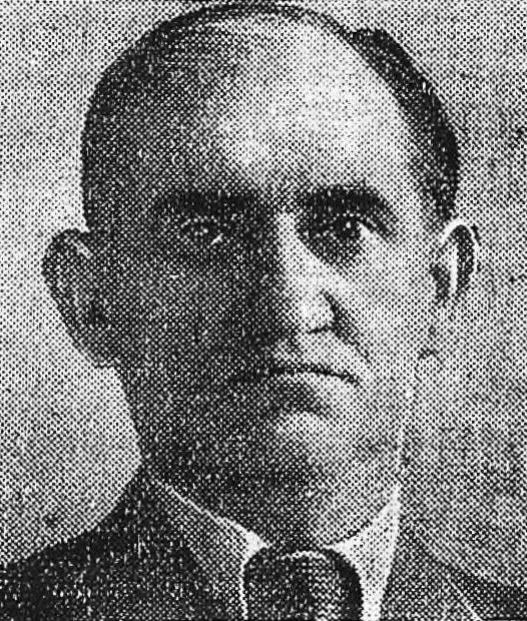
Georges Marrane

Georges Marrane (20 January 1888, Louviers, Eure – 27 August 1976) was a French politician. He was the candidate of the French Communist Party for the presidential election of 1958.

== Life and career ==
Marrane became the first Communist mayor of the northern city of Ivry in 1925. He remained in this elected position for forty years, except for the occupied period during World War II, until his retirement from politics in 1965. However, one must also acknowledge Marrane for his work in 1941 bringing together various factions of the French Resistance to lead the formation of the Front National. Marrane chose the identity of an eccentric, harmless old man on a bicycle, with a long French bread stick in his bicycle pannier. Madeleine Braun, who in the 1930s had been active in the anti-fascist Amsterdam-Pleyel movement and the Aid for Spain Committee recalled that: "Georges preferred the bicycle because of a liking for sport but also to avoid checkpoints at railway stations ... Marrane always carried a loaf of bread on the back of his bike in order to look like a pensioner on his way back from market ... He always went around with a droopy moustache which attracted the name Vercingetorix from other resistance movements." This Gallic identity with his hallmark bicycle and hirsute face made him quite acceptable to anyone, almost a figure of fun and certainly not a security threat. Children over a wide area knew him by sight and called him "the cyclist" while others knew him as Vercingetorix. For three years he furrowed the back roads of the Free Zone taking vital intelligence and orders hither and thither without being intercepted. Later in the war, he served on the Paris Liberation Committee and helped in the handover to de Gaulle's Free French in 1944.

== Presidential election of 1958 ==
The election of 1958 was the first presidential contest of the French Fifth Republic. Marrane competed against the wartime hero Charles de Gaulle; a third candidate, Albert Châtelet, represented a coalition of non-communist leftist groups. On 21 December 1958, de Gaulle swept the election, taking approximately 77% of the vote. Marrane received 13%, just a few percentage points above Châtelet.
