= Soustelle Plan =

The Soustelle Plan was a reform program envisioned by Jacques Soustelle, then governor general of Algeria, for the improvement of several administrative, political, social and economic works which emphasized the integration of Muslim Algerians within the French system. The plan was proposed to the French government in June 1955 but was never fully implemented.

== The proposal ==
Soustelle’s first concern for the implementation of his plan was to inject funds into the Algerian economy for small improvement projects designed to have an immediate effect. After a short struggle with the finance ministry in Paris, an allocation of 4,300 million francs was obtained. Thereafter, Soustelle engaged in social-political reforms by sending out a circular, making it compulsory on all persons in authority to pursue a "policy of consideration and confidence".

His intention was to eradicate the superiority complex which the European population had adopted in terms of discrimination and condescension towards the Arab-Algerian populace. Third, Soustelle took into consideration the agricultural situation of Algeria as this was the primary source of revenue for the country. However, there were several obstacles; erosion had claimed 100,000 acres (400 km^{2}) per year.

To meet the challenge of the countryside, Soustelle administered an agency with wide powers to acquire public and private land for redistribution to Muslim peasants and to secure land beneficiaries with the technical and financial assistance which could improve these new holdings. He also expanded the existing facilities such as the Provident Societies and Rural Improvement Sectors and also abolished the cultural phenomenon of khammessat, a sharecropping system under which the tenant got one fifth of the crop and the landowner four-fifths. As the cost of power in Algeria was 60% higher than in metropolitan France; Soustelle advocated lower costs of power which increased industrialization. He sought to amalgamate the Algerian Gas and Power Company with the nationalized Électricité de France or through a system of tax relief.

Soustelle also had concerns about the social structure of the country. Only 29% of civil jobs were held by Muslims, while the rest were occupied by Europeans. To amend this anomaly, Soustelle instituted an Administration Training Center in Algiers, as a means of finding qualified Muslim candidates for suitable jobs. He also attempted, without success, to implement a system whereby qualified Muslims would be exempted from completing any competitive entry examination. Likewise, Soustelle was passionate about schools. He fought for funding to build 1,200 schools instead of the originally planned 600 schools.

Faced with an overwhelming number of requests from teachers that wanted to leave the unsettled areas of Algeria, he hired supplementary teachers to keep the schools open. Likewise, he proposed to make the study of Arabic compulsory or at least optional in all schools. He also planned to envelop the country with social centers which would combat illiteracy, promote hygiene and encourage small crafts.

He also had a goal to reduce the large territory division into more manageable units and to bring administration closer to the people. He intended to create several departments to aid him. Soustelle proposed to divide the previous administrative townships into smaller rural townships each corresponding with their own natural community. Soustelle envisaged that the rural townships would remain under the subtle tutelage of the administration until they were ready to self-govern themselves. Finally to fill in the vacuum between the civil administrator and the dispersed inhabitants Soustelle set up 400 Specialized Administration Sections (S.A.S) to be manned by a new corps of Algerian Affairs officer. Amongst their many duties were to create a protective web for populations that might be subject to rebels or trammeled by the army or both.

The Soustelle Plan was submitted to the French government in June 1955; however it was never fully carried out in all the planned prospects.

== Notes ==
=== Bibliography ===
- Adams, Geoffrey (1998). The Call of Conscience. Waterloo: Wilfrid Laurier University Press. ISBN 0-88920-299-0.
- Ageron, Charles (1990). Modern Algeria. New Jersey: Africa World Press. ISBN 1-85065-027-6.
- Bocca, Geoffrey (1968). The Secret Army. New Jersey: Prentice Hall Publishers.
- Brace, Richard (1960). Ordeal in Algeria. New Jersey: D.Van Nostrand Company.
- Clark, Michael (1959). Algeria in Turmoil. New York: Frederick A Praeger Publishers.
