= Conseil national de la Résistance (1962) =

The Conseil national de la Résistance (CNR) was an underground French nationalist militant organization, founded 20 May 1962 in Milan. It was named after the 1943 Conseil national de la Résistance French resistance organization. It was dissolved in 1963, when Antoine Argoud was arrested by the French secret service in Munich, charged with the attempted assassination of French president Charles de Gaulle, and several of the other members went into exile, facing charges from the government. In 1968, a general amnesty was issued, Argoud was released from prison, and several of the former CNR members returned to France, some even returning to public life.

== See also ==
- Conseil national de la Résistance
- Organisation armée secrète
- Georges Bidault
- Jacques Soustelle
- Antoine Argoud
- Pierre Sergent
- Pied-Noir
