= Union of the Democratic Forces (France) =

Union of the Democratic Forces Union des forces démocratiques
- Founded: 7 July 1958; 66 years ago
- Dissolved: April 1960; 64 years ago
- Succeeded by: Unified Socialist Party (unofficially)
- Headquarters: Paris
- Ideology: Democratic socialism Socialism; Anti-Gaullism
- Political position: Centre-left to left-wing

The Union of the Democratic Forces (Union des forces démocratiques, UFD) was an electoral coalition set up in 1958 by many trade unions, political, and associative organizations to unite the non-communist left opposed to the return of General Charles de Gaulle to power and the French Fifth Republic. It was also strongly opposed to the 1958 constitutional referendum, also put forward by de Gaulle.

All except two of its candidates were defeated in the 1958 legislative election. However, its candidate in the indirect 1958 presidential election, Albert Châtelet, a left-wing scientist, finished third. He obtained 6,721 votes or 8.46% of the vote, mostly due to the absence of a democratic socialist candidate.

Having failed to overcome debates over its ideology and role, as well as the fact that the population voted strongly for the 1958 referendum, the UFD disappeared, with many joining the Unified Socialist Party.
