= Chienlit =

Traditional French term typically translated as masquerade

Chienlit is a traditional French term typically translated as masquerade (French: Mascarade) or carnival/chaos. It was brought to notoriety by General Charles de Gaulle in an angry speech during the student protests in Paris during May 1968 in France, when he used the vernacular term as a scatological pun "La réforme oui, la chie-en-lit non" meaning Reform yes, but chaos—no whilst the pun was Reform—yes, shit in bed—no.

The term is now common parlance in French political commentary, used both critically and ironically referring back to de Gaulle.

== Origins ==
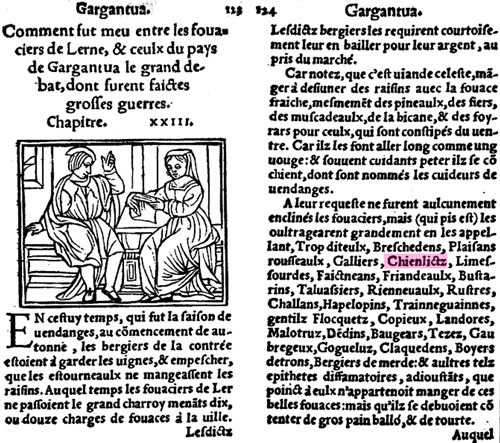
First written appearance of the word Chienlictz in Gargantua.

The blurred etymological origin of chie-en-lit / chienlit was the medieval carnival/masquerade when peasants and artisans had one day per year to celebrate, to abandon all work and chores, to abandon contemporary mores and conventions, to shit in bed. Somebody would be chosen as king for a day, and even the lord of the manor sometimes joined in, enduring ritual humiliation, such as being led through the streets like a servant, or slave, or dog.

The first known appearance of the term is in the 16th century novel Les Cinq livres des faits et dits de Gargantua et Pantagruel (The Five Books of the Lives and Deeds of Gargantua and Pantagruel by François Rabelais. and it was used by Émile Zola in both Nana (1880), and L'Assommoir (1887).

== Charles de Gaulle ==
'Chienlit' was brought to notoriety by General Charles de Gaulle in an angry speech during the student protests in Paris during May 1968 in France, when he used the vernacular term as a scatological pun "La réforme oui, la chie-en-lit non" meaning shit in bed. He used it first in a private meeting discussing the demand for direct participation in business and government by students and workers. This was first reported by the Minister of Information Georges Gorse and softened by the French media to 'masquerade/chaos'. De Gaulle then repeated it in a TV broadcast for high impact.

Subsequently, the students re-used the expression on leaflets where the silhouette of de Gaulle was accompanied by the slogans "La chienlit, c'est lui ! - the chienlit, it's him!" and "La chienlit, c'est encore lui ! - it's still him!"

The term is now common parlance in French political commentary, used both critically and ironically referring back to de Gaulle.

== Chien lit - dog bed ==
De Gaulle's use of obscure vernacular profanity in a major speech was initially mistranslated by The Guardian and the English press corps as chien lit - dog bed, alluding to a chaotic, dishevelled, malodorous, flea pit, as in the English expression "a dog's breakfast".

== See also ==
- Movement of 22 March
- Anarchism in France
