= 2000 French constitutional referendum =

- 24 September 2000
- Reduce the term of the President from seven years to five years.

Results
Choice	Votes	%
Yes	7,407,697	73.21%
No	2,710,651	26.79%
Valid votes	10,118,348	83.91%
Invalid or blank votes	1,940,340	16.09%
Total votes	12,058,688	100.00%
Registered voters/turnout	39,941,192	30.19%
- Referendum results in each department (darker hue = higher percentage voted "yes")

A constitutional referendum was held in France on 24 September 2000. The proposal to reduce the mandate of the President from seven years to five years was approved by 73.2% of those who voted, but turnout was just 30.2%.

== Background ==
The idea of a five-year term was discussed during the French parliamentary session of 1848, but rejected in favor of a four-year term. A seven-year term was adopted in 1873 for what became the Third Republic. In 2000, Jacques Chirac led the campaign for the referendum reducing the President's term from seven to five years. After he was re-elected in 2002, his term ended in 2007 rather than 2009. The aim of the quinquennat (five-year term) was for the legislative elections to follow the presidential election (as the presidential election took place in April–May 2007, while the legislative election took place in June), providing similar electoral results and reducing the risk of cohabitation.

== Results ==
Choice	Metropolitan France		Total	
Choice	Votes	%	Votes	%
For	7,372,976	73.2	7,407,697	73.2
Against	2,703,657	26.8	2,710,651	26.8
Invalid/blank votes	1,939,282	–	1,940,340	–
Total	12,015,915	100	12,058,688	100
Registered voters/turnout	39,631,063	30.3	39,941,192	30.2
Source: Nohlen & Stöver

== See also ==
- Constitutional amendments under the Fifth French Republic
- Sexenio (Mexico)
