= Albert Châtelet =

French politician and mathematician (1883–1960)

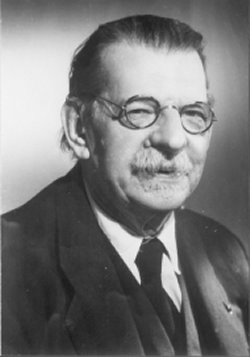
- Born: 24 October 1883; Valhuon, France
- Died: 30 June 1960 (aged 76); Paris, France
- Education: École Normale Supérieure
- Scientific career
- Fields: Mathematics
- Doctoral advisor: Jules Tannery
- Doctoral students: André Néron; Marcel-Paul Schützenberger; Jacques Riguet

Albert Châtelet (24 October 1883 – 30 June 1960) was a French mathematician and politician.

== Biography ==
Châtelet was a student at the École normale supérieure (Paris) from 1905 to 1908, succeeding to the Agrégation (a highly selective competitive examination for future high-school teachers) in 1908. After earning a doctorate in 1911 and serving first in the health service, then in a ballistic research unit during the First World War, Châtelet became a lecturer at École centrale de Lille and in 1920 a professor at Université de Lille, rising to the rank of vice-chancellor by 1924. After thirteen years of chancellorship he was appointed as the director of secondary education by the Ministry of National Education, where he served under Jean Zay until 1940. In 1945 he joined the Faculty of Science at the University of Paris, succeeding Jean Cabannes as its dean in 1949.

In 1947 Châtelet introduced a concept of normality for relations in composition series and proved a general theorem similar to Jordan–Hölder decomposition and Schreier refinement theorem. He also wrote "Algebra de relations de congruence". Investigation of binary relations was further pursued by his student Jacques Riguet.

Châtelet also did research on number theory and group theory. He introduced the research of Kurt Hensel, Helmut Hasse, and the German school of p-adic number theorists into France. Châtelet edited volume 5 of the collected works of Henri Poincaré. In 1920 he gave a plenary address at the International Congress of Mathematicians in Strasbourg: Loi de Réciprocité Abélienne. In 1947 he was the president of the Société Mathématique de France. A university center in the 5th Arrondissement of Paris and a prize of the CNRS (Albert-Châtelet-Medaille) are named in his honor.

After his retirement as dean in 1954, Châtelet began participating in political movements at the forefront of the downfall of the French Fourth Republic by joining the Rationalist Union in 1955. In 1958 Albert Châtelet was chosen to represent the Union of Democratic Forces as its candidate during the French presidential election. He earned only 8.4% of the vote, losing out to the Union of Democrats for the Republic candidate Charles de Gaulle.

One of his sons was the mathematician François Châtelet, who is not to be confused with the French philosopher of the same name.
