= May 1958 crisis in France =

Political crisis in France during the Algerian War of Independence

May 1958 crisis
- Part of the Algerian War
Date	13–29 May 1958
Location	France, Algeria
Result	Fall of the French Fourth Republic

Belligerents
French Fourth Republic	Units of French Army, French Navy and French Air Force

Commanders and leaders
René Coty; Pierre Pflimlin	Army General Raoul Salan; Army General Jacques Massu; Army Air General Edmond Jouhaud; Admiral Philippe Auboyneau; Jacques Soustelle; Pierre Lagaillarde

Strength
Government-loyal armed forces	Dissident armed forces

Casualties and losses
None	Unknown

The May 1958 crisis (French: Crise de mai 1958), also known as the Algiers putsch or the coup of 13 May, was a political crisis in France during the turmoil of the Algerian War (1954–1962). The events of May 1958 led to the collapse of the Fourth Republic and its replacement by the Fifth Republic led by Charles de Gaulle, who returned to power after a twelve-year absence.

The crisis started as a right-wing political uprising in Algiers on 13 May 1958 and then became a military coup d'état led by a coalition headed by Algiers deputy and reserve airborne-officer Pierre Lagaillarde, by Generals Raoul Salan, Edmond Jouhaud, Jean Gracieux and Jacques Massu, and by Admiral Philippe Auboyneau, commander of the Mediterranean fleet. Former Algerian Governor General Jacques Soustelle and his activist allies supported the coup.

The coup aimed to oppose the formation of Pierre Pflimlin's proposed new government in Paris and to impose a change of policies in favor of the right-wing partisans of French Algeria.

== Context ==
Recurrent cabinet crises focused attention on the inherent instability of the Fourth Republic and increased the misgivings of the French Army and of the Pieds-noirs (European Algerians) that the security of French Algeria, a then overseas department of France, was being undermined by party politics. Army commanders chafed at what they took to be inadequate and incompetent government support of military efforts to end the war. The feeling was widespread that another debacle like that of Indochina in 1954 was in the offing and that the government would order another overly precipitous pullout and sacrifice French honor to political expediency.

== The coup ==
After his tour as Governor General, Jacques Soustelle had returned to France to organize support for de Gaulle's return to power, while retaining close ties to the army and the settlers. By early 1958, he had organized a coup d'état, bringing together dissident army officers and colonial officials with sympathetic Gaullists. On 13 May, right-wing elements seized power in Algiers and called for a Government of Public Safety under General de Gaulle. Massu became chairman of the Public Safety Committee and one of the leaders of the revolt. General Salan assumed leadership of a Committee of Public Safety formed to replace the civil authority and pressed the junta's demands that de Gaulle be named by French president René Coty to head a government of national union invested with extraordinary powers to prevent the "abandonment of Algeria". Salan announced on radio that the Army had "provisionally taken over responsibility for the destiny of French Algeria". Under the pressure of Massu, Salan declared Vive de Gaulle! from the balcony of the Algiers Government-General building on 15 May. De Gaulle answered two days later that he was ready to "assume the powers of the Republic". Many worried as they saw this answer as support for the army.

At a 19 May press conference, de Gaulle asserted again that he was at the disposal of the country. When a journalist expressed the concerns of some who feared that he would violate civil liberties, de Gaulle retorted vehemently:

Have I ever done that? Quite the opposite, I have reestablished them when they had disappeared. Who honestly believes that, at age 67, I would start a career as a dictator?

On 24 May, French paratroopers from Algeria landed on Corsica by aircraft, taking the French island in a bloodless action called "Opération Corse." Subsequently, preparations were made in Algeria for "Operation Resurrection," which had as objectives the seizure of Paris and the removal of the French government, through the use of paratroopers and armoured forces based at Rambouillet. "Operation Resurrection" was to be implemented if one of three scenarios occurred: if de Gaulle was not approved as leader of France by Parliament, if de Gaulle asked for military assistance to take power, or if it seemed that the French Communist Party was making any move to take power in France.

Political leaders on many sides agreed to support the general's return to power with the notable exceptions of François Mitterrand, who was a minister in Guy Mollet's Socialist government, Pierre Mendès-France (a member of the Radical-Socialist Party, former Prime Minister), Alain Savary (also a member of the French Section of the Workers' International (SFIO)), and the Communist Party. The philosopher Jean-Paul Sartre, a noted atheist, said, “I would rather vote for God,” as he would at least be more modest than de Gaulle. Mendès-France and Savary, opposed to their respective parties' support of de Gaulle, would form together, in 1960, the Parti socialiste autonome (PSA, Socialist Autonomous Party), ancestor of the Parti socialiste unifié (PSU, Unified Socialist Party).

== De Gaulle's return to power (29 May 1958) ==
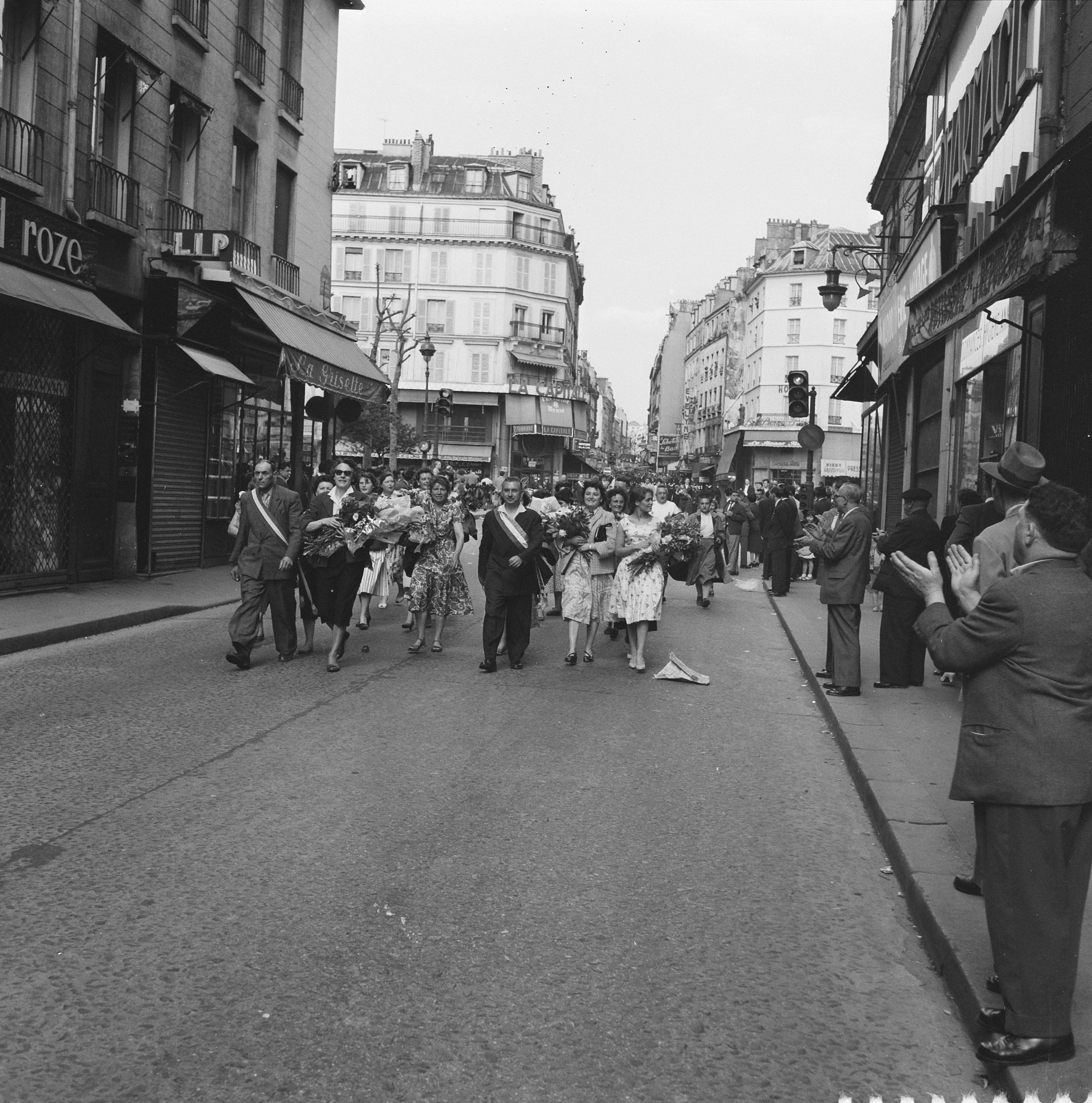
Demonstration on rue du Faubourg-du-Temple in Paris on 1 June

On 29 May President René Coty told parliament that the nation was on the brink of civil war, so he was "turning towards the most illustrious of Frenchmen, towards the man who, in the darkest years of our history, was our chief for the reconquest of freedom and who refused dictatorship in order to re-establish the Republic. I ask General de Gaulle to confer with the head of state and to examine with him what, in the framework of Republican legality, is necessary for the immediate formation of a government of national safety and what can be done, in a fairly short time, for a deep reform of our institutions." De Gaulle accepted Coty's proposal under the precondition that a new constitution would be introduced creating a powerful presidency in which a sole executive, the first of which was to be himself, ruled for seven-year periods. Another condition was that he be granted extraordinary powers for a period of six months.

De Gaulle's newly formed cabinet was approved by the National Assembly on 1 June 1958, by 329 votes against 224, while he was granted the power to govern by ordinances for a six-month period as well as the task to draft a new Constitution.

The May 1958 crisis indicated that the Fourth Republic by 1958 no longer had any support from the French army in Algeria, and was at its mercy even in civilian political matters. This decisive shift in the balance of power in civil-military relations in France in 1958 and the threat of force was the main immediate factor in the return of de Gaulle to power in France.

=== The new constitution ===
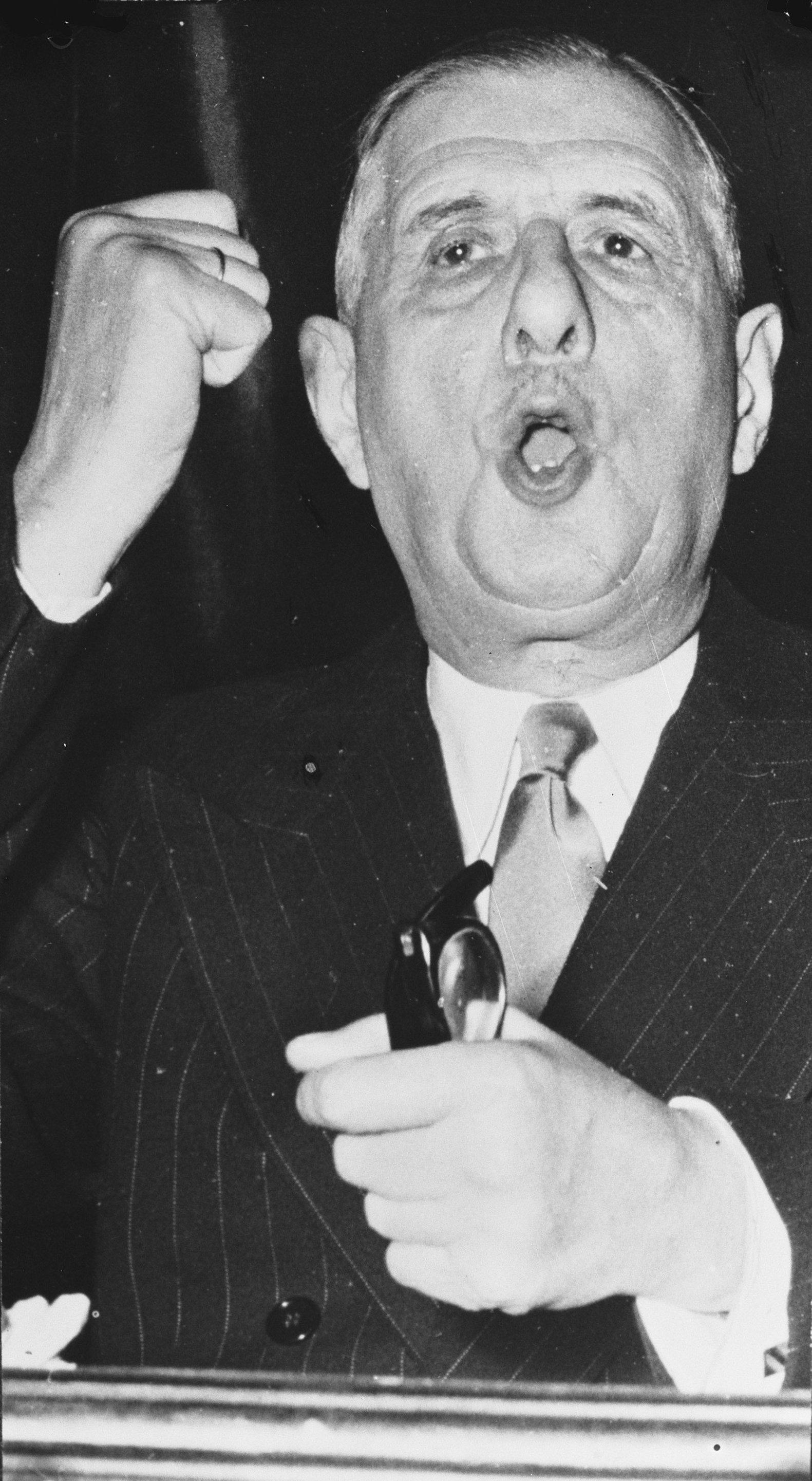
Charles de Gaulle, pictured in 1958

De Gaulle blamed the institutions of the Fourth Republic for France's political weakness – a Gaullist reading still popular today. As he commissioned the new constitution and was responsible for its overall framework, de Gaulle is sometimes described as the author of the constitution, although it was effectively drafted during the summer of 1958 by the Gaullist Michel Debré. The draft closely followed the propositions in de Gaulle’s speech in Bayeux in 1946, leading to a strong executive and to a rather presidential regime – the President being granted the responsibility of governing the Council of Ministers, as well as to the adoption of article 16, granting "extraordinary powers" to the president if a state of emergency was proclaimed, and to bicameralism.

Although most politicians supported de Gaulle, Mitterrand, who opposed the new Constitution, famously denounced "a permanent coup d'état" in 1964. On 28 September 1958, a referendum took place and 79.2% of those who voted supported the new constitution and the creation of the Fifth Republic. The colonies (Algeria was officially three departments of France, not a colony) were given the choice between immediate independence and the new constitution. All colonies voted for the new constitution and the replacement of the French Union by the French Community, except Guinea – which thus became the first French African colony to gain independence, at the cost of the immediate cessation of all French assistance.

De Gaulle was elected President of the French Republic and of the African and Malagasy Community on 21 December 1958 by indirect suffrage. He was inaugurated on 8 January 1959. In the meanwhile, de Gaulle had met the German chancellor Konrad Adenauer on 14 September 1958 at his home in Colombey-les-Deux-Églises; he had sent a memorandum to US President Dwight D. Eisenhower on 17 September 1958, recalling his will of national independence; he also took financial measures on 27 December 1958 to reduce the state deficit, and, in Algeria, called for the "peace of the brave" (paix des braves) in October 1958.

== See also ==
- Algiers putsch of 1961
- 16 May 1877 crisis (establishing the pre-eminency of Parliament over the President in the French Third Republic)
- 28th of February process, a process in which the Turkish Armed Forces forced the Islamist prime minister out of office
