= 1962 French presidential election referendum =

- 28 October 1962
- Do you approve of the bill submitted to the French people by the President of the Republic and relating to the election of the President of the Republic by universal suffrage?

Results
Choice	Votes	%
Yes	13,150,516	62.25%
No	7,974,538	37.75%
Valid votes	21,125,054	97.37%
Invalid or blank votes	569,509	2.63%
Total votes	21,694,563	100.00%
Registered voters/turnout	28,185,478	76.97%

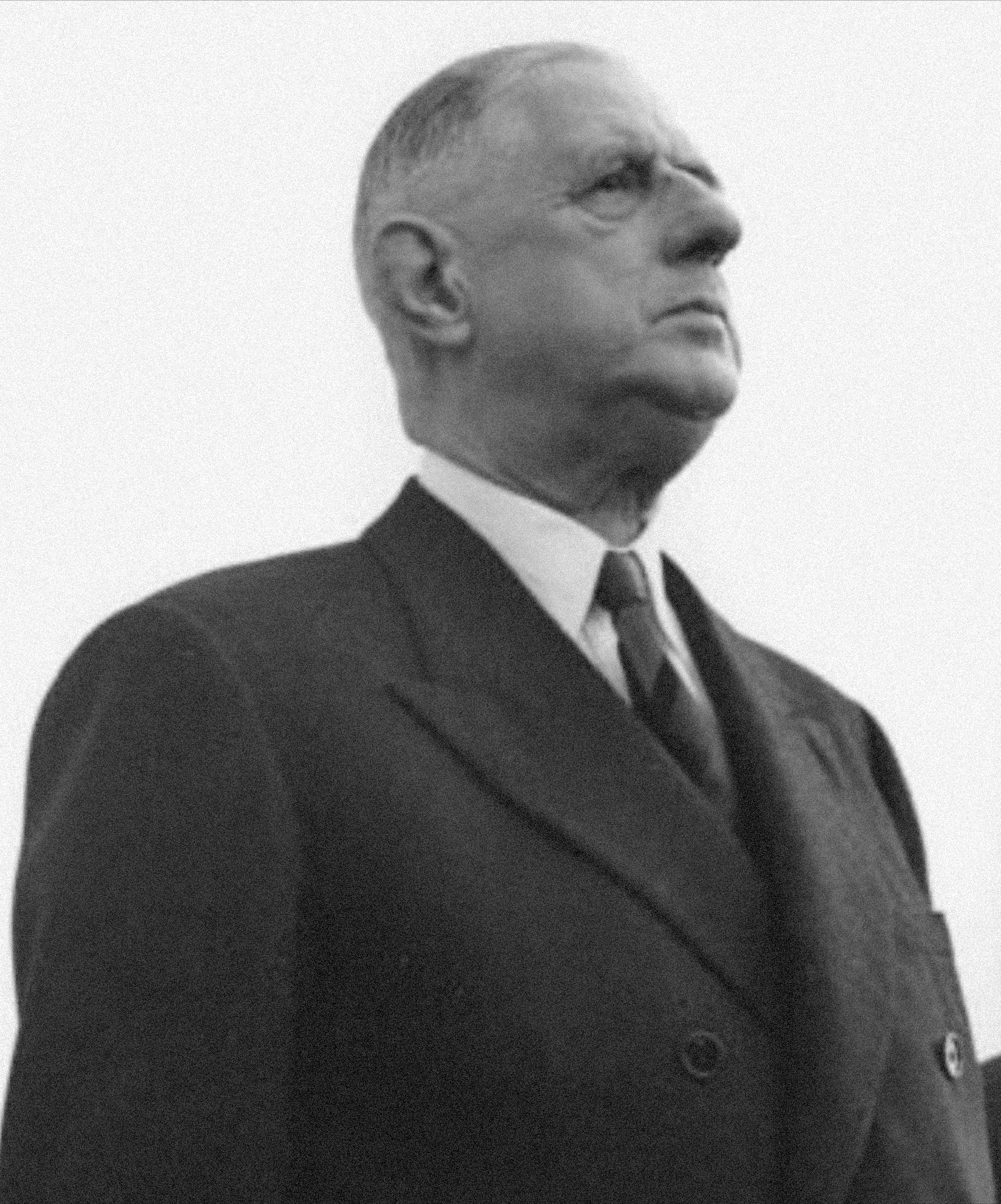
President Charles de Gaulle in 1961

A referendum on the method of the election of the president was held in France on 28 October 1962. The question was whether to have the President of the French Republic elected by direct popular vote, rather than by an electoral college. It was approved by 62.3% of voters with a 77.0% turnout. The reform was controversial because it strengthened the executive at the expense of Parliament, and because of the disputed constitutionality of the procedure used.

== Background ==
In the Third and Fourth Republic, Parliament elected the President of the Republic. In the original 1958 constitution of the Fifth Republic, the president was elected by an electoral college, in a manner similar to the senators: electors were the members of Parliament, members of the departmental assemblies, and representatives of cities, towns and villages (such as mayors). Charles de Gaulle was elected in this manner in the 1958 presidential election.

The presidential office in the Third and Fourth republic was largely ceremonial, with most executive power vested in the President of the Council of Ministers, a more powerful analogue to the present-day Prime Minister. De Gaulle, who largely designed the constitution of the Fifth Republic, wanted a more powerful presidential office. The proposed change would have the president elected by the two-round system of voting; the president being directly elected by citizenry, and with at least half of the non-blank ballots cast, would give the office much more legitimacy and status in the eyes of the public than indirect election by the presidential college, and thus greater political influence even with unchanged constitutional powers.

== Proposal and debate ==
See 1962 French legislative election for more about the French politics of that time.

De Gaulle soon preferred to be elected by direct popular vote, which would give him a stronger political position, and proposed that the Constitution be amended.

The referendum was highly controversial. Part of the controversy concerned the constitutional processes for modifying the Constitution. According to article 89 of the Constitution of France, any constitutional reform must be first approved by both houses of Parliament: the National Assembly and the Senate. Then it is either approved by a referendum, or by a solemn joint session of both houses known as Congress. Instead, de Gaulle used Article 11 of the Constitution, which allows the Prime Minister, then Georges Pompidou, to request the President to submit to a referendum a bill in certain areas of law, including "the organization of public powers". To summarize, supporters of de Gaulle and the referendum contended that Article 11 allowed bills to be passed on constitutional matters, while opponents considered that the existence of a special process in Article 89 precluded this.

Many legal scholars and politicians disagreed with this application of Article 11, which they felt was unconstitutional, while Gaullists generally supported the move. François Mitterrand, former minister and future President of the Republic, characterized the referendum as unconstitutional. Gaston Monnerville, president of the Senate, referred the matter to the Constitutional Council (Article 61). The council however ruled that it fell outside of its jurisdiction to strike down a reform voted by the French people, thus upholding de Gaulle's action. This was unsurprising: from 1958 to 1970, under de Gaulle's presidency, the Constitutional Council was sometimes described as a "cannon aimed at Parliament", protecting the executive branch against encroachment by Parliament; all referrals except the one from Monnerville had come from the Prime Minister, who always got a ruling of partial unconstitutionality (the council had struck down for unconstitutionality provisions introduced by Parliament that the Prime Minister disagreed with). Monnerville went as far as to use the strong word of forfaiture ("abuse of authority") against the behaviour of Prime Minister Pompidou, who had accepted the referendum project.

Many members of the National Assembly were also very unhappy about the situation. On 4 October 1962, the Assembly passed a motion of no confidence in the Government, resulting in the automatic resignation of the Prime Minister (per article 49-2); this was the only successful vote of no-confidence of the Fifth Republic until 2024. The vote was supported by, among others, former prime ministers Paul Reynaud and Guy Mollet, who severely criticized the referendum. De Gaulle dissolved the Assembly within a few days, thus provoking legislative elections in November, and appointed Georges Pompidou again.

== Results ==
Choice	Metropolitan France		Total	
Choice	Votes	%	Votes	%
For	12,809,363	61.8	13,150,516	62.3
Against	7,932,695	38.2	7,974,538	37.7
Invalid/blank votes	559,758	–	569,509	–
Total	21,301,816	100	21,694,563	100
Registered voters	27,582,113	–	28,185,478	–
Source: Nohlen & Stöver

== Aftermath ==
Since the referendum was positive, the mode of election of the president changed, and Charles de Gaulle remains the only president of France elected by an electoral college. Charles de Gaulle was reelected in 1965, this time by direct suffrage.
