= 1973 French legislative election =

- 4 March and 11 March 1973

All 491 seats to the French National Assembly 246 seats were needed for a majority
- Turnout: 81.2% (▲1.2 pp) (1st round); 81.9% (▲0.7 pp) (2nd round)
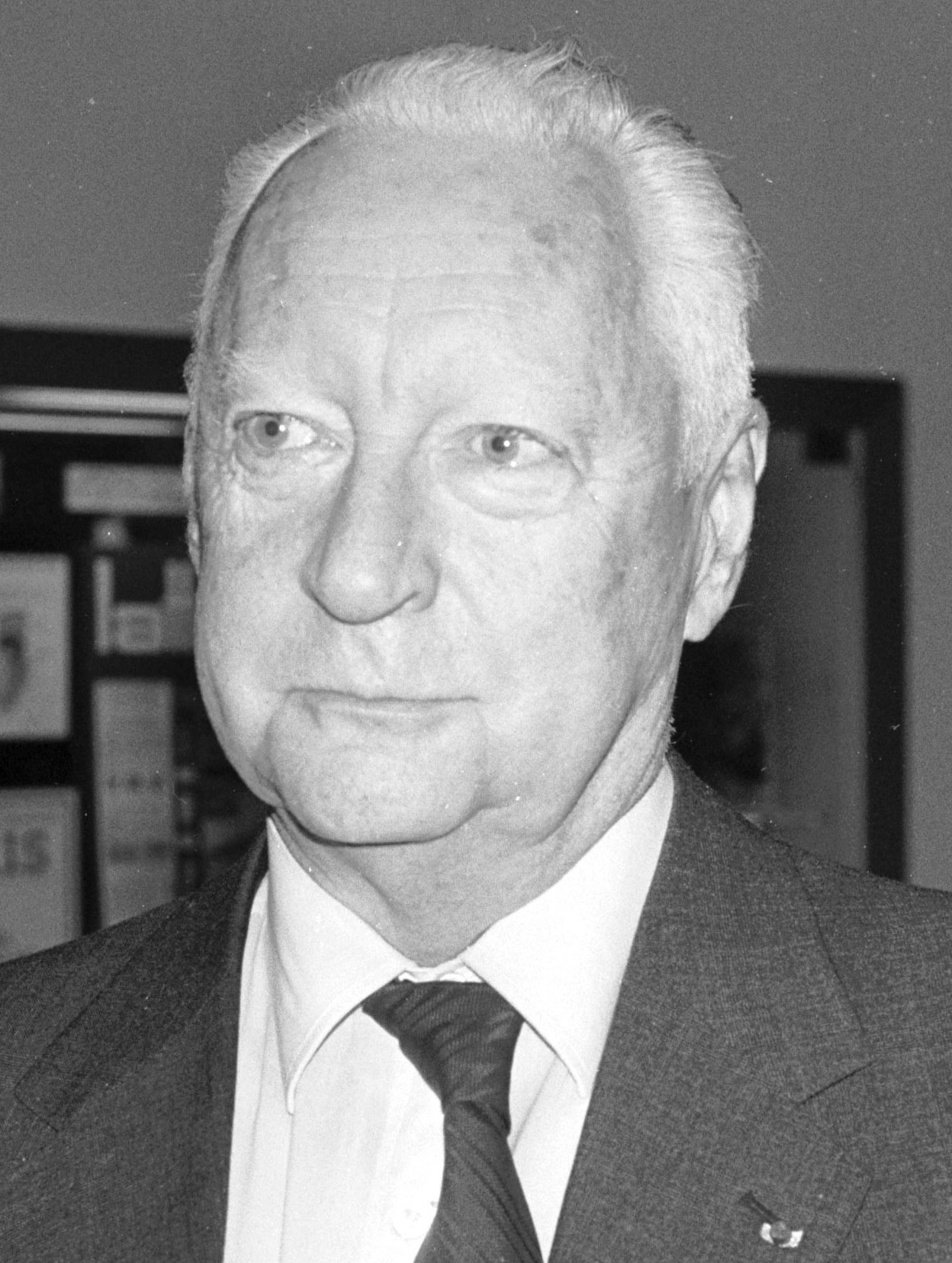

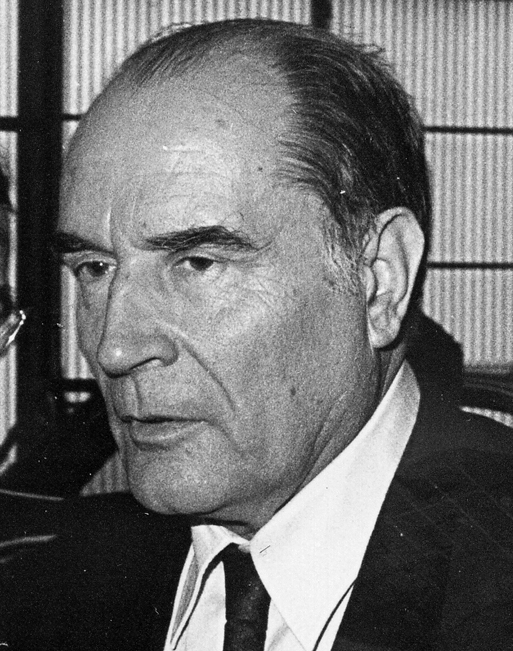

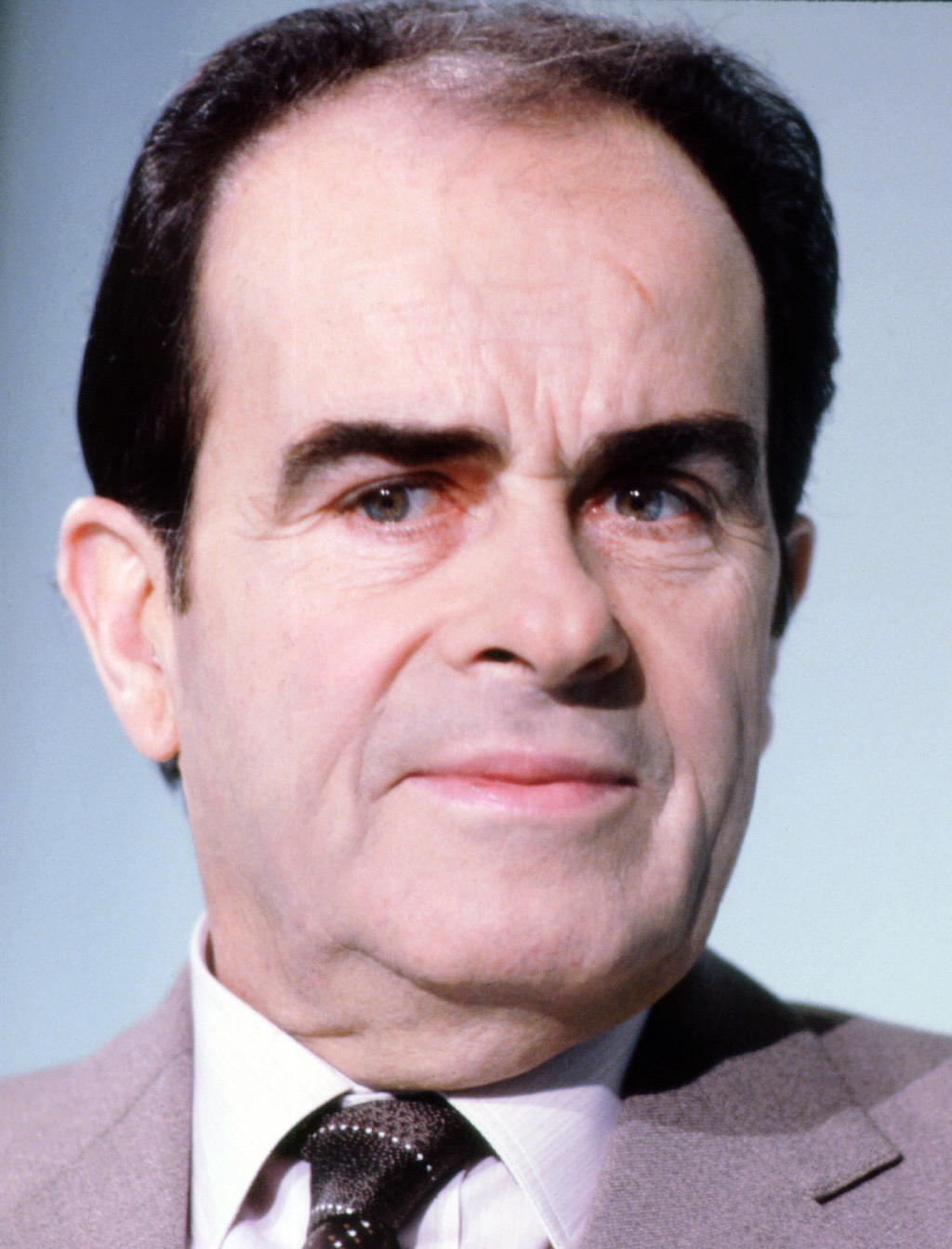

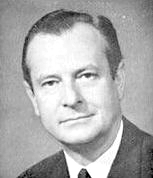
	Majority party	Minority party
Leader	Pierre Messmer	François Mitterrand
Party	UDR	PS
Leader's seat	Moselle-8th	Nièvre-3rd
Last election	354 seats, 43.7%	57 seats, 16.5%
Seats won	272^{*}	102
Seat change	▼82	▲45
Popular vote	8,242,661 (1st round); 10,701,135 (2nd round)	4,559,241 (1st round); 5,564,610 (2nd round)
Percentage	34.68% (1st round); 45.62% (2nd round)	19.18% (1st round); 23.72% (2nd round)
	Third party	Fourth party
Leader	Georges Marchais	Jean-Jacques Servan-Schreiber (PR), Jean Lecanuet (CD, above)
Party	PCF	MR
Leader's seat	none	Nancy (Servan-Schreiber), Seine-Maritime (Lecanuet)
Last election	34 seats, 20.0%	33 (PDM)
Seats won	73	30
Seat change	▲39	▼3
Popular vote	5,085,108 (1st round); 4,893,876 (2nd round)	2,979,781 (1st round); 1,631,978 (2nd round)
Percentage	21.39% (1st round); 20.86% (2nd round)	12.54% (1st round); 6.96% (2nd round)
- ^{*} Including Independent Republicans and Centre, Democracy and Progress.
PM before election
Pierre Messmer
UDR
Elected PM
Pierre Messmer
UDR

Legislative elections were held in France on 4 and 11 March 1973, to elect the fifth National Assembly of the Fifth Republic.

In order to end the May 1968 crisis, President Charles de Gaulle dissolved the National Assembly and his party, the Gaullist Party Union of Democrats for the Republic (UDR), won the absolute majority of the seats in the May 1968 elections. However, the failure of his 1969 constitutional referendum led him to resign. His former Prime minister Georges Pompidou was elected president.

In order to respond to the discontent expressed during May 1968, Jacques Chaban-Delmas, the left-wing Gaullist who led the cabinet, promoted a programme of reforms for the advent of a "New Society", which advocated social dialogue and political liberalisation. This worried the conservative part of the Presidential Majority and Pompidou himself. Furthermore, Chaban-Delmas was accused, by the presidential circle, to want strengthen his powers to the detriment of Pompidou. In 1972, Chaban-Delmas is replaced by Pierre Messmer, a classical and conservative Gaullist.

After Gaston Defferre's catastrophic result in the 1969 presidential election, the SFIO was replaced by the Socialist Party (PS), formed by the SFIO's merger with an array of political clubs on the democratic left. Two years later, François Mitterrand's Convention of Republican Institutions joined the PS. He took the party's lead during the Epinay Congress, and proposed to form an alliance with the French Communist Party (PCF). In order to prepare the legislative elections, Communists and Socialists signed the Programme commun.

The Radical Party split over the question of the Programme commun. The left-wing minority joined the "Union of Left" and founded the Movement of the Radical-Socialist Left (MGRS). The majority created the Reforming Movement with a part of the center-right. This new group claimed its independence towards the "Union of Left" and the Presidential Majority.

The Programme commun was the main issue of the campaign. Its defenders pleaded the necessity to nationalize banks and companies which were in a situation of monopoly. The members of the Presidential Majority denounced a collectivist project and warned against the participation of Communists in the government if the Left won. The Reforming Movement tried to express a third way rejecting the Marxism of the Left and the Euroscepticism of the Gaullists, but it was obliged to link with the Right to obtain parliamentary seats.

Whilst the left won an increased number of votes and MPs, the Presidential Majority won the election. The Gaullist UDR lost one third of its parliamentary seats due to the growth of the Left and electoral agreements with its allies, the Independent Republicans and Centre, Democracy and Progress. Messmer was confirmed as Prime Minister.

== Results ==
Party	First round		Second round		Total seats
Party	Votes	%	Votes	%	Total seats
Union of Republicans for Progress	8,242,661	34.76	10,701,135	45.62	262
French Communist Party	5,063,981	21.35	4,893,876	20.86	73
Socialist Party–MGRS	4,899,965	20.66	5,564,610	23.72	101
Reformist Movement	2,967,481	12.51	1,631,978	6.96	32
Unified Socialist Party and far-left	781,976	3.30	114,540	0.49	3
Presidential majority	779,259	3.29	337,399	1.44	14
Miscellaneous right	679,684	2.87	21,053	0.09	2
Miscellaneous left	299,938	1.26	191,441	0.82	3
Total	23,714,945	100.00	23,456,032	100.00	490
Valid votes	23,714,945	97.77	23,456,032	96.68	
Invalid/blank votes	541,877	2.23	804,390	3.32	
Total votes	24,256,822	100.00	24,260,422	100.00	
Registered voters/turnout	29,865,345	81.22	29,666,161	81.78	
Source: Quid, IPU
