= 1981 French legislative election =

- 14 June and 21 June 1981

All 491 seats to the French National Assembly 246 seats were needed for a majority
- Turnout: 70.3% (first round) ▼12.5pp 74.5% (second round) ▲4.2pp
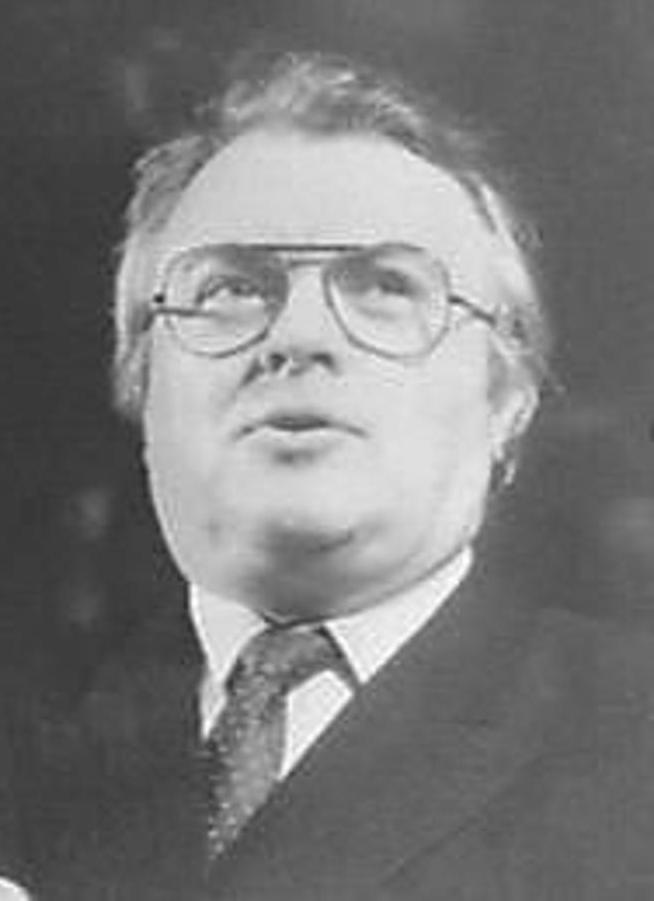

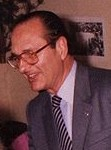

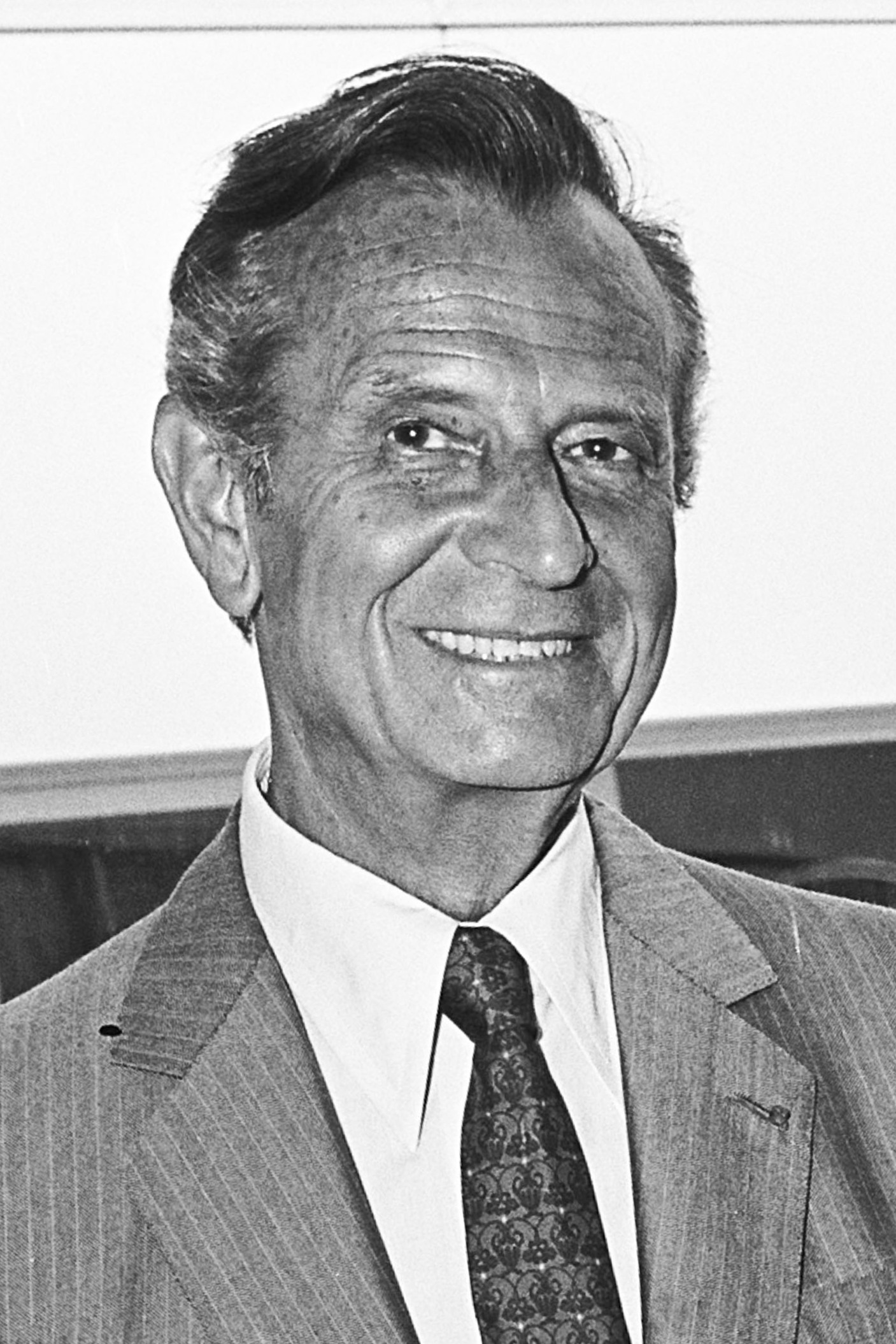

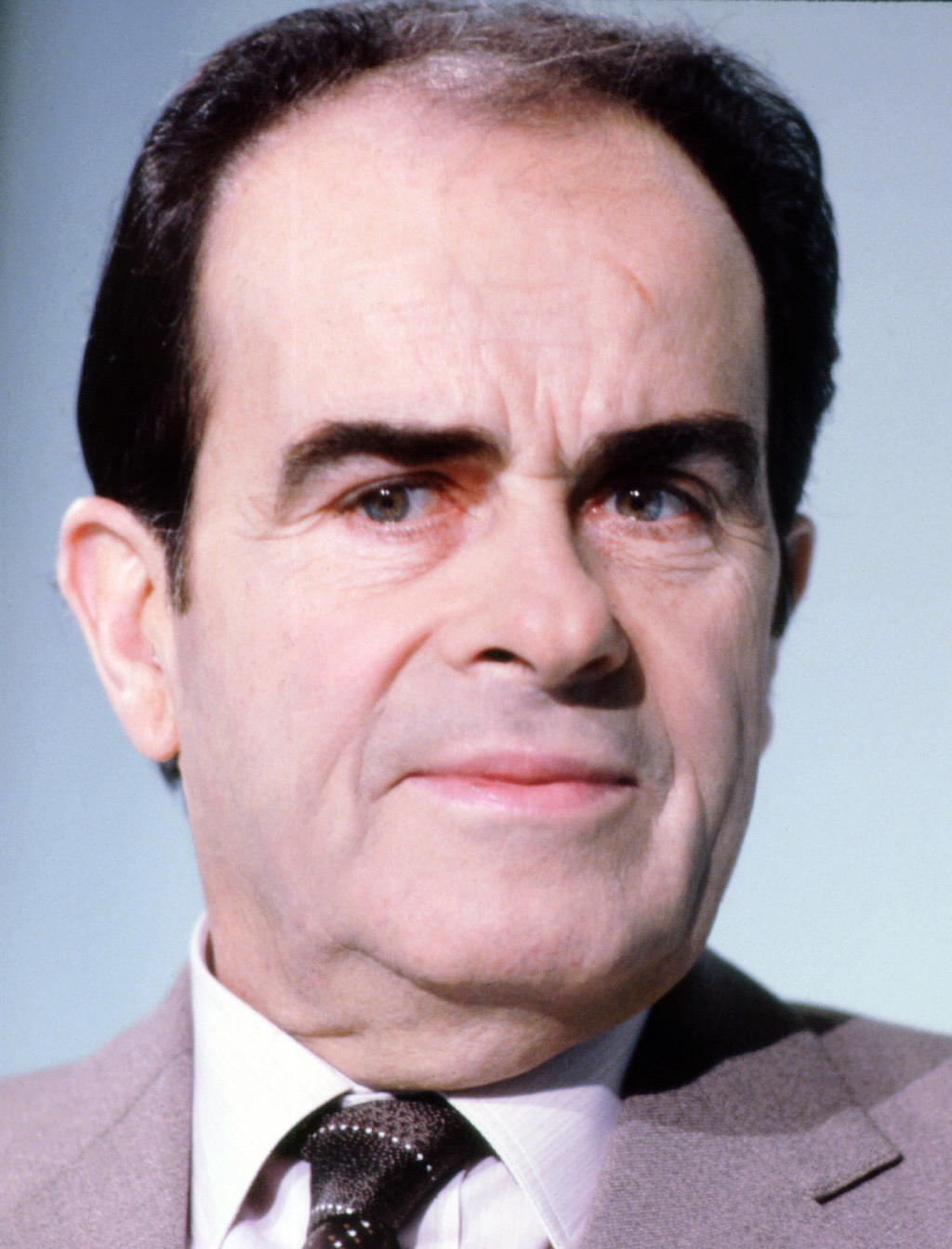
	Majority party	Minority party
Leader	Pierre Mauroy	Jacques Chirac
Party	PS	RPR
Leader's seat	Nord	Corrèze
Last election	103 seats, 22.6%	148 seats, 22.6%
Seats won	269	85
Seat change	▲166	▼63
Popular vote	9,432,362 (1st round); 9,198,332 (2nd round)	5,231,269 (1st round); 4,174,302 (2nd round)
Percentage	37.52% (1st round); 49.25% (2nd round)	20.81% (1st round); 22.35% (2nd round)
	Third party	Fourth party
Leader	Jean Lecanuet	Georges Marchais
Party	UDF	PCF
Leader's seat	Seine-Maritime (Senator)	none
Last election	121 seats, 21.5%	86 seats, 20.6%
Seats won	62	44
Seat change	▼59	▼42
Popular vote	4,827,437 (1st round); 3,489,363 (2nd round)	4,065,540 (1st round); 1,303,587 (2nd round)
Percentage	19.20% (1st round); 18.68% (2nd round)	16.17% (1st round); 6.98% (2nd round)
Prime Minister before election
Raymond Barre
UDF
Elected Prime Minister
Pierre Mauroy
PS

Legislative elections were held in France on 14 and 21 June 1981, to elect the seventh National Assembly of the Fifth Republic. The elections were called after François Mitterrand won the 1981 presidential elections and subsequently dissolved the National Assembly.

The Socialist Party (PS) achieved the biggest electoral success of their history. This result marked the triumph of Mitterrand's strategy. Like the Gaullist Union of Democrats for the Republic in 1968, the PS obtained an absolute parliamentary majority. The French Communist Party (PCF) obtained its poorest result since 1936 and lost the half of its MPs, most of them to the PS. However, four Communists became members of Pierre Mauroy's government. This was the first PCF governmental participation since 1947. The two main right-wing parliamentary parties, the Rally for the Republic (RPR) and Union for French Democracy (UDF), lost the half of their seats too. This result earned the nickname "the pink wave" from the press.

== Background ==
On 10 May 1981 François Mitterrand was elected president, becoming the first Socialist to win a presidential election under universal suffrage. It was also the first occasion of alternance (between the right and the left) in government during the Fifth Republic.

The new head of state nominated Pierre Mauroy to lead a Socialist cabinet. He then dissolved the National Assembly so that he could rely on a parliamentary majority. The left had lost the 1978 legislative election and the full term of the National Assembly would have expired in 1983.

== Campaign ==
Knocked out after its defeat in the recent presidential election, the right campaigned against the concentration of the powers and the possible nomination of Communist ministers. However, it suffered from the economic crisis, the will for change amongst the electorate, and the rivalry between RPR leader Jacques Chirac and previous UDF President Valéry Giscard d'Estaing. The formation of the Union for a New Majority appeared as a false reconciliation and so, had not convinced voters. Furthermore, as the PCF had been declining, and was no longer the dominant party of the Left, it did not seem to be a real danger.

The Communist leaders were very disappointed by the result of their candidate, Georges Marchais, in the presidential election, and very worried by the legislative elections. During the presidential campaign, the PCF had denounced the "turn towards the right" of the Socialist Party, in vain. It understood that Mitterrand was ready to win his bet, expressed in the 1972 Congress of the Socialist International, to capture 3 of the 5 million PCF voters. Perceiving the great hope of the left-wing voters after Mitterrand's election, Marchais signed a "contract of government" with the First Secretary of the PS Lionel Jospin.

== Results ==
Party	First round			Second round			Total seats
Party	Votes	%	Seats	Votes	%	Seats	Total seats
Socialist Party	9,432,362	37.52	47	9,198,332	49.25	222	269
Movement of Left Radicals	9,432,362	37.52	1	9,198,332	49.25	13	14
Rally for the Republic	5,231,269	20.81	50	4,174,302	22.35	35	85
Union for French Democracy	4,827,437	19.20	43	3,489,363	18.68	18	61
French Communist Party	4,065,540	16.17	7	1,303,587	6.98	37	44
Miscellaneous right	704,788	2.80	7	408,861	2.19	4	11
Far-left	334,674	1.33	0	3,517	0.02	0	0
Ecologists	271,688	1.08	0				0
Miscellaneous left	183,010	0.73	1	97,066	0.52	6	7
Far-right	90,422	0.36	0				0
Total	25,141,190	100.00	156	18,675,028	100.00	335	491
Valid votes	25,141,190	98.56		18,675,028	97.33		
Invalid/blank votes	367,610	1.44		512,678	2.67		
Total votes	25,508,800	100.00		19,187,706	100.00		
Registered voters/turnout	36,257,433	70.35		27,757,374	69.13		
Source: IPU

=== Parliamentary groups in the National Assembly ===
Party	Seats
Socialist Group	285
RPR Group	88
UDF Group	62
Communist Group	44
Non-Inscrits	12
Total	491
