= 1967 French legislative election =

- 5 March 1967 (first round); 12 March 1967 (second round)

All 487 seats in the French National Assembly 244 seats needed for a majority
- Turnout: 80.90% (first round) ▲12.17pp 70.09% (second round) ▼2.21pp
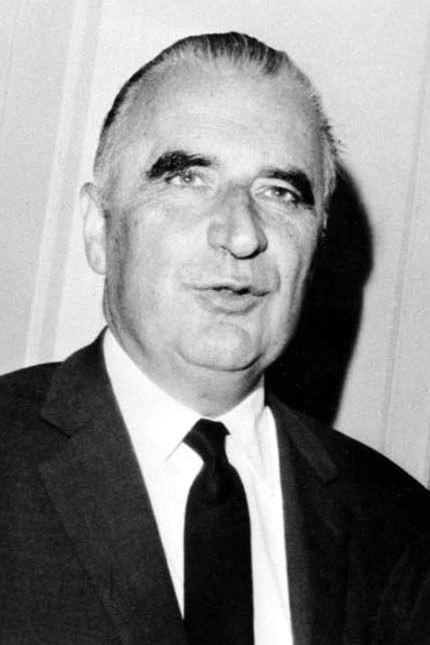

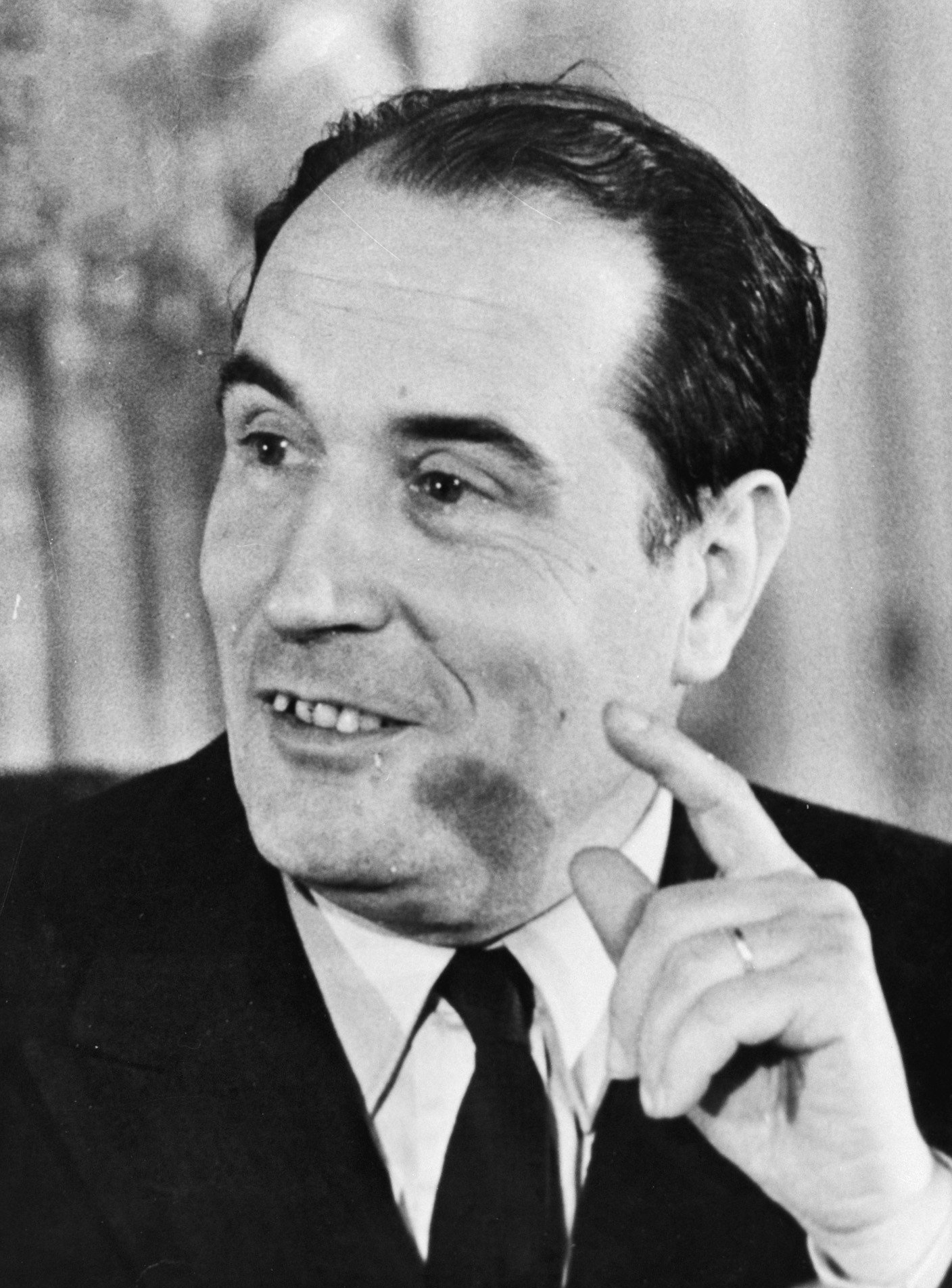

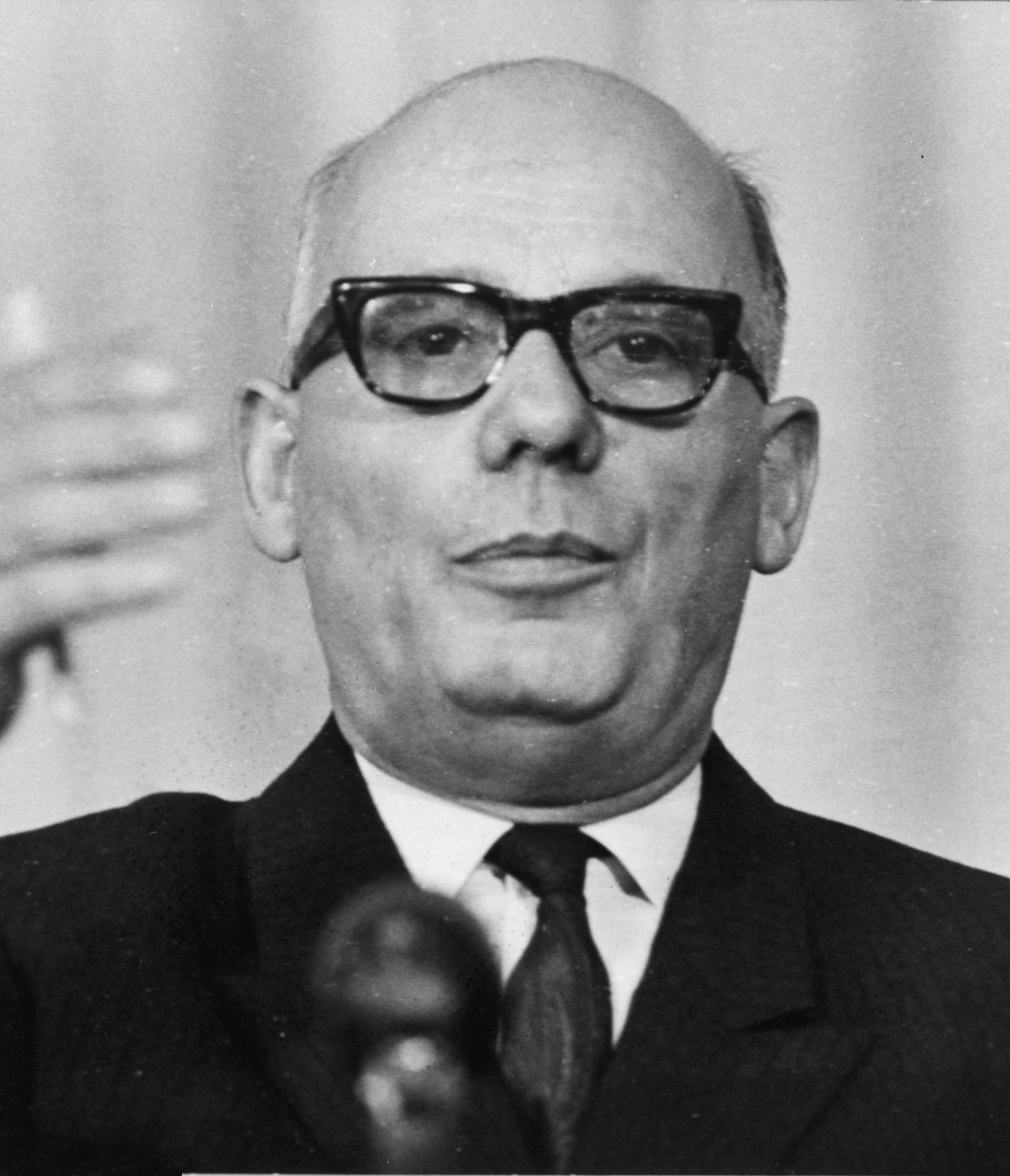

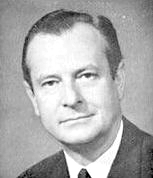
	Majority party	Minority party
Leader	Georges Pompidou	François Mitterrand
Party	UDR	FGDS
Leader's seat	Cantal-2nd	Nièvre-3rd
Last election	249 seats, 31.9%	107 seats, 20.3%
Seats won	240	118
Seat change	▼8	▲11
Popular vote	8,453,512 (1st round); 7,972,908 (2nd round)	4,207,166 (1st round); 4,505,329 (2nd round)
Percentage	37.75% (1st round); 42.61% (2nd round)	18.79% (1st round); 24.08% (2nd round)
	Third party	Fourth party
Leader	Waldeck Rochet	Jean Lecanuet
Party	PCF	CD
Leader's seat	Seine-Saint-Denis-3rd	Seine-Maritime (Senator)
Last election	41 seats, 21.8%	64 seats (MRP and CNIP)
Seats won	73	42
Seat change	▲32	▼22
Popular vote	5,029,808 (1st round); 3,998,790 (2nd round)	2,864,272 (1st round); 1,328,777 (2nd round)
Percentage	22.46% (1st round); 21.37% (2nd round)	12.79% (1st round); 7.10% (2nd round)
PM before election
Georges Pompidou
UDR
Elected PM
Georges Pompidou
UDR

Legislative elections were held in France on 5 March 1967, with a second round on 12 March, electing the third National Assembly of the Fifth Republic. Although the Gaullists retained their absolute majority, the results made it clear that Charles de Gaulle's position was weakening, as the French Communist Party and the Socialists achieved 40% representation in parliament.

== Background ==
In December 1965 Charles de Gaulle was re-elected President of France in the first Presidential election by universal suffrage. However, contrary to predictions, there had been a second ballot. This election marked a process of rebuilding by the opposition.

François Mitterrand's unexpected result, as De Gaulle's challenger in the second round of the presidential election, allowed him to establish himself as the leader of the non-Communist Left. He led the Federation of the Democratic and Socialist Left (FGDS), composed of the French Section of the Workers' International (SFIO, socialist party), the Radical Party and several left-wing republican clubs, which concluded an electoral agreement with the French Communist Party (PCF).

Ahead of the election, minor redistricting occurred to account for the impending dissolution of the Seine and Seine-et-Oise departments in Ile-de-France, which contained Paris and its western suburbs, due to take place on 1 January 1968. While the existing constituencies in Paris were already fully contained within the city's boundaries, and thus needed no change in light of its promotion to a department in its own right, the remaining constituencies of the two dissolved departments were replaced by ones for the then-unestablished Yvelines, Essonne, Hauts-de-Seine, Seine-Saint-Denis, Val-de-Marne, and Val-d'Oise.

The centrist and right-wing opposition to de Gaulle gathered in the Democratic Centre led by Jean Lecanuet, the "third man" of 1965 presidential election. However some centrists refused to integrate into this group and joined the Gaullist Party, which became the Union of Democrats for the Fifth Republic (UD5).

== Campaign ==
Prime Minister Georges Pompidou led the campaign of the incumbent majority, but this was divided. In January 1966, a cabinet reshuffle took place. The Independent Republicans (RI) leader and Economy minister Valéry Giscard d'Estaing was dismissed from the cabinet. His group stayed in the Presidential Majority but with a more critical position. He summed up this attitude by a "yes, but..." to Gaullist policies.

== Results ==
The result of the first round was perceived as a punishment against the Presidential Majority, which obtained a surprisingly low result. The outcome of the second round depended on the centrist voters. The Gaullists warned voters against a return to the Fourth Republic, political instability and "Communist danger". The alliance between centrists and the candidates of the Presidential Majority in some constituencies explained the victory of the Right in the second round.

The left improved in comparison with the previous legislative election and the Presidential Majority won with only a one-seat majority. The centrist deputies were not numerous enough to force the Gaullists to make compromises. Georges Pompidou was confirmed as Prime Minister of a UDR-RI cabinet.

Party	First round		Second round		Total seats
Party	Votes	%	Votes	%	Total seats
Union for the Defence of the Republic–Independent Republicans	8,453,512	37.75	7,972,908	42.61	240
French Communist Party	5,029,808	22.46	3,998,790	21.37	73
Federation of the Democratic and Socialist Left	4,207,166	18.79	4,505,329	24.08	118
Democratic Centre	2,864,272	12.79	1,328,777	7.10	42
Miscellaneous	1,136,191	5.07	702,352	3.75	9
Unified Socialist Party and far-left	506,592	2.26	173,466	0.93	5
Republican Alliance for Progress and Liberties	194,776	0.87	28,347	0.15	0
Total	22,392,317	100.00	18,709,969	100.00	487
Valid votes	22,392,317	97.84	18,709,969	96.97	
Invalid/blank votes	494,834	2.16	584,368	3.03	
Total votes	22,887,151	100.00	19,294,337	100.00	
Registered voters/turnout	28,291,838	80.90	27,526,358	70.09	
Source: Quid, IPU

=== Parliamentary groups in the National Assembly ===
Graph of the party split among 486 seats.
Party	Seats
Union for the Defence of the Republic Group	200
Federation of the Democratic and Socialist Left Group	121
French Communist Party Group	73
Independent Republicans Group	42
Progress and Modern Democracy Group	41
Non-Inscrits	9
Total	486
Source: Quid
