= Reformist Movement (France) =

Defunct political group in France

The Reformist Movement (French: Mouvement réformateur, MR) was a French centrist political alliance created in 1971 by the Radical Party (PR) led by Jean-Jacques Servan-Schreiber, and the Christian-democratic Democratic Centre (CD) headed by Jean Lecanuet.

The first convention of the movement was held on 3 November 1971 in Saint-Germain-en-Laye. In addition to the two major components, the Reformist Movement was joined by the Republican Centre led by André Morice (that had split from the Radical Party during the Algerian War); as well as two anti-communist breakaway groups from the Socialist Party, namely Émile Muller's "Party of Socialist Democracy" and Max Lejeune's "Democratic-Socialist Movement of France" (that later became the Social Democratic Party). The tiny parties "Progress and Freedom" of Jacques Soustelle and "European Liberal Party" of Jean-Paul David were linked to the movement as well, but not invited to the founding convention at the request of Pierre Abelin.

The movement proposed to form a third alternative between the rightist "Presidential Majority" of Georges Pompidou, dominated by the Gaullists, on the one hand, and the "Union of the Left" comprising the Socialist and Communist parties on the other hand. However, the more leftist faction of the Radical Party (the nascent "Movement of the Radical Socialist Left" led by Robert Fabre, that later became the Radical Party of the Left) refused the alliance with the Christian Democrats and joined the Union of the Left instead.

The rivalry of the two main parties and its leaders Lecanuet and Servan-Schreiber destabilised the alliance, its components remained largely independent. In the first round of the 1973 legislative election, it won 12.5 percent of votes, trailing far behind the two major camps. Due to the majoritarian electoral system, their candidates qualified for the run-off in only a few constituencies. Thanks to withdrawal agreements with the right-wing parties, however, the Reformist Movement succeeded in forming a parliamentary group of 30 members and 4 affiliated, called the "Social Democratic Reformers" (Réformateurs démocrates sociaux, RDS).

One year later, the Reformist Movement's components supported the winning candidacy of Valéry Giscard d'Estaing, leader of the conservative-liberal Independent Republicans, at the 1974 presidential election. The member parties of the MR joined Giscard's centre-right government. In July 1974, the RDS parliamentary group merged with the Centrist Union group (formerly allied with the Gaullists) to form the "Reformers, Centrists and Social Democrats" (RCDS) group. The Reformist Movement itself became inactive. In 1978, the constituent parties of the former Reformist Movement, together with Giscard d'Estaing's Independent Republicans, formed the centre-right Union for French Democracy (UDF).

== See also ==
- Category:Reformist Movement (France) politicians
