= 1978 French legislative election =

- 12 and 19 March 1978

All 491 seats to the French National Assembly 246 seats were needed for a majority
- Turnout: 82.8% (▲1.6 pp) (1st round); 84.7% (▲1.9 pp) (2nd round)
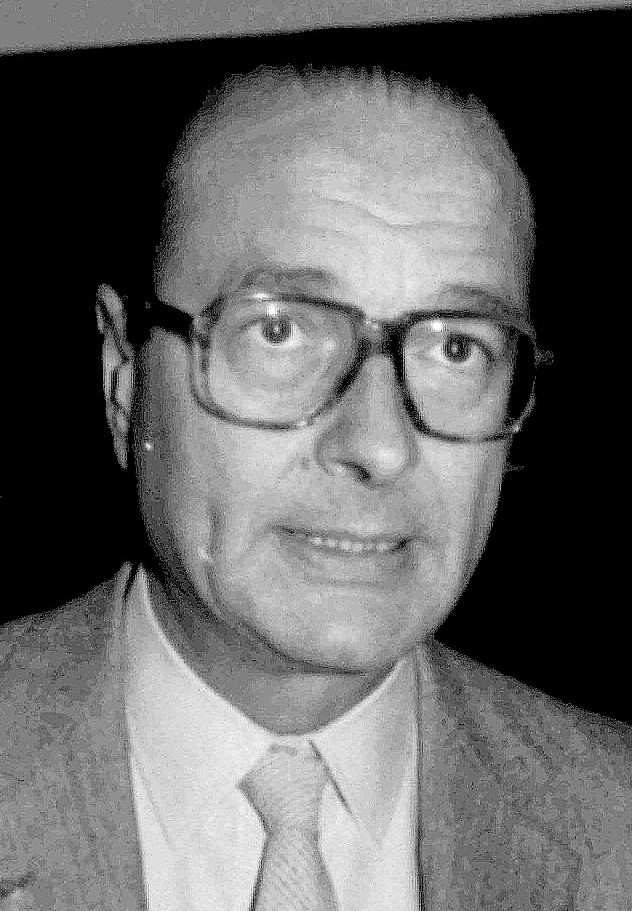

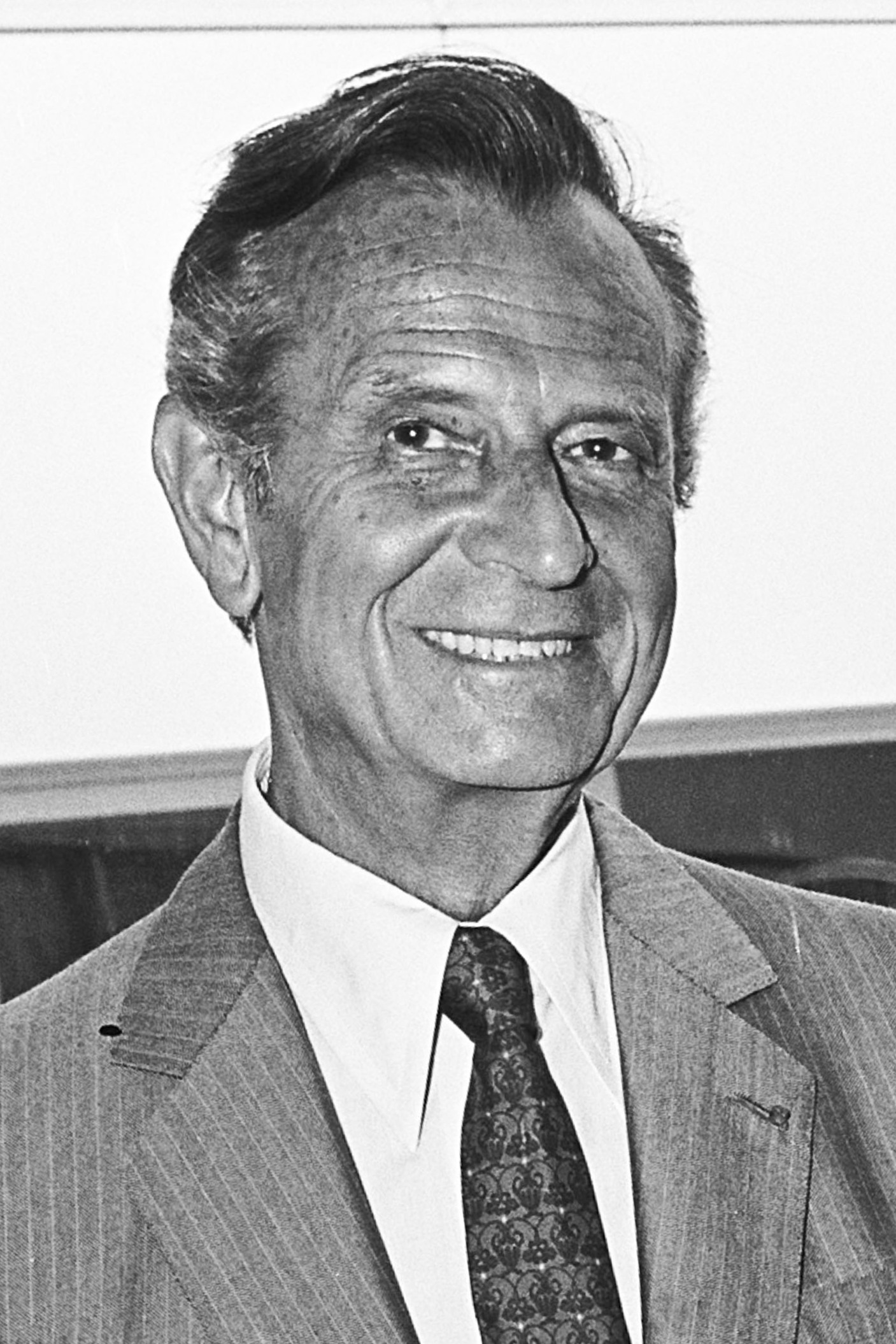

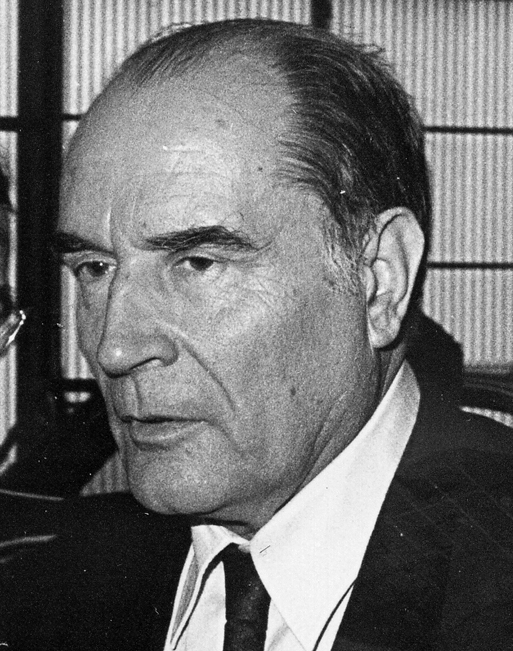

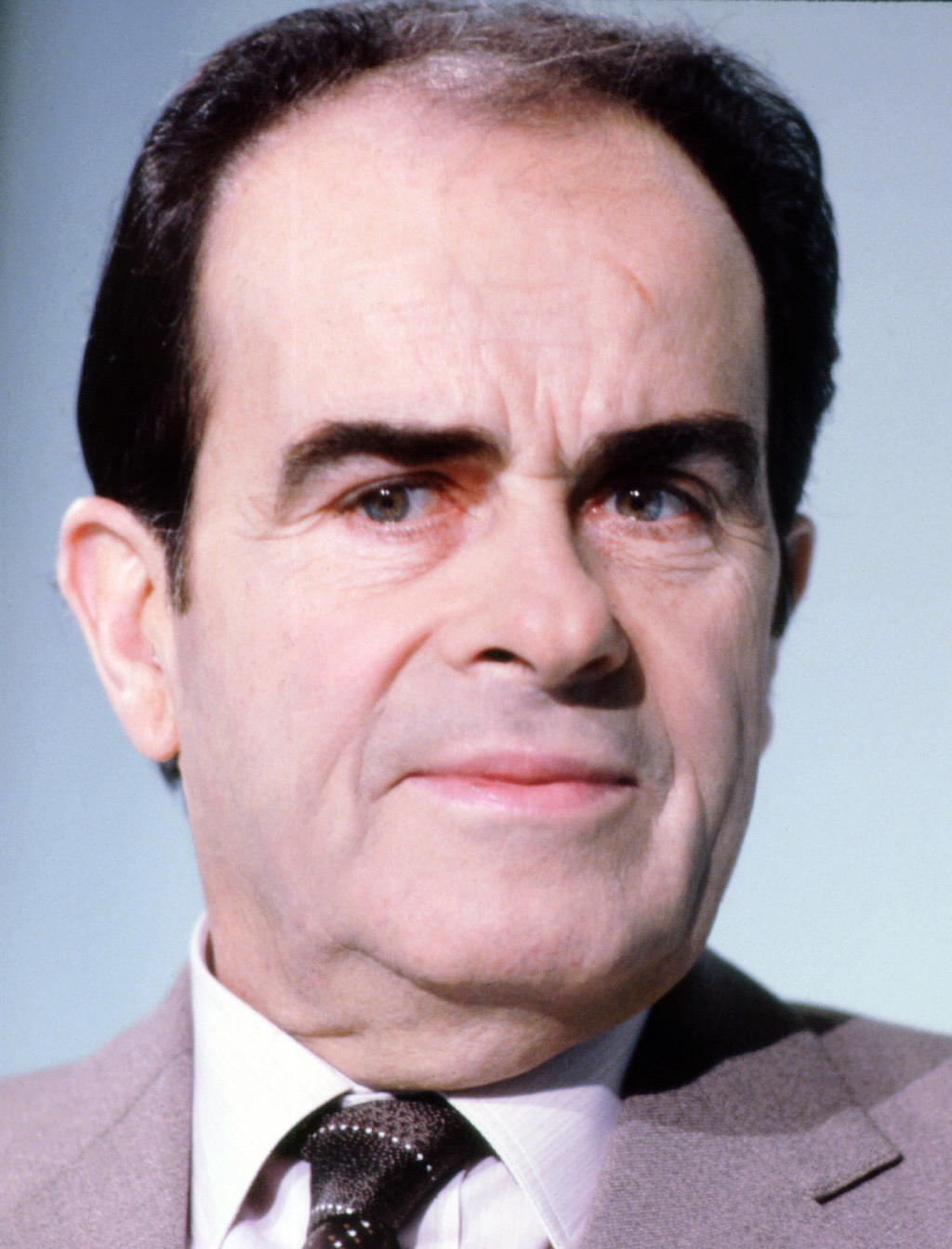
	Majority party	Minority party
Leader	Jacques Chirac	Jean Lecanuet
Party	RPR	UDF
Leader's seat	Corrèze-3rd	Seine-Maritime (Senator)
Last election	183 seats (UDR)	119 seats (MR)
Seats won	150	121
Seat change	▼33	▲2
Popular vote	6,462,462 (1st round); 6,651,756 (2nd round)	6,128,849 (1st round); 5,907,603 (2nd round)
Percentage	22.62% (1st round); 26.11% (2nd round)	21.45% (1st round); 23.18% (2nd round)
	Third party	Fourth party
Leader	François Mitterrand	Georges Marchais
Party	PS	PCF
Leader's seat	Nièvre-3rd	none
Last election	102 seats, 20.7%	73 seats, 21.4%
Seats won	104	86
Seat change	▲2	▲13
Popular vote	6,451,151 (1st round); 7,212,916 (2nd round)	5,870,402 (1st round); 4,744,868 (2nd round)
Percentage	22.58% (1st round); 28.31% (2nd round)	20.55% (1st round); 18.62% (2nd round)
Prime Minister before election
Raymond Barre
UDF
Elected Prime Minister
Raymond Barre
UDF

Legislative elections were held in France on 12 and 19 March 1978 to elect the sixth National Assembly of the Fifth Republic. The election results were a victory for conservatives. The results were considered a surprise, as most electoral indications were that the left-wing would win the elections.

On 2 April 1974, President Georges Pompidou died. The non-Gaullist centre-right leader Valéry Giscard d'Estaing was elected to succeed him. Because the Gaullist Union of Democrats for the Republic (Union des démocrates pour la République, UDR) was the largest party in the pro-Giscard majority in the Assembly, Giscard chose Jacques Chirac to lead the cabinet. This period was one of renovation for Gaullism.

The presidential will to "govern towards the centre" and to promote a "modern liberal society" disconcerted the Gaullist party. The Abortion Act and the reduction of the age of majority to 18 years worried a part of the conservative electorate. Furthermore, a personal conflict opposed the two heads of the executive. In August 1976, Chirac resigned because he considered that he did not have "the means to carry on [his] function of Prime Minister".

Three months later, the UDR was replaced by the Rally for the Republic (Rassemblement pour la République, RPR). This, Chirac's electoral machine, was officially a member of the Presidential Majority but frequently criticized the liberal and pro-European policy of President Giscard d'Estaing and his new prime minister Raymond Barre. The executive duo reacted by federating the non-Gaullist centre-right in the Union for French Democracy (Union pour la démocratie française, UDF).

While the right-wing majority was divided and the economic situation deteriorated, the "Union of the Left" won the mid-term local elections. According to the polls, it was the favourite to win the legislative election. In his Verdun-sur-le-Doubs speech, President Giscard d'Estaing warned the French voters that he could not prevent the enforcement of the left-wing Common programme if the "Union of the Left" won. The Socialist Party (Parti socialiste, PS) and the French Communist Party (Parti communiste français, PCF) did not update their Common programme due to increasing tension between the two parties resulting from the PS gaining in electoral success at the PCF's expense.

For the first time since 1936, the Socialists obtained more votes than the Communists. Furthermore, the French electorate appeared evenly shared among four equivalent political parties (RPR, UDF, PS, PCF). Barre was confirmed as Prime Minister. Until the 2007 French legislative election, it was the last time that either the right or the left had won back-to-back legislative elections.

== Results ==
Party	First round			Second round			Total seats
Party	Votes	%	Seats	Votes	%	Seats	Total seats
Rally for the Republic	6,462,462	22.63	31	6,651,756	26.11	119	150
Socialist Party	6,451,151	22.59	1	7,212,916	28.31	103	104
Union for French Democracy	6,128,849	21.46	26	5,907,603	23.19	98	124
French Communist Party	5,870,402	20.55	4	4,744,868	18.62	82	86
Far-left	953,088	3.34	0				0
Miscellaneous	793,274	2.78	0	57,418	0.23	1	1
Presidential majority	684,985	2.40	6	305,763	1.20	10	16
Ecologists	612,100	2.14	0				0
Radical Movement of the Left	603,932	2.11	0	595,478	2.34	10	10
Total	28,560,243	100.00	68	25,475,802	100.00	423	491
Valid votes	28,560,243	98.00		25,475,802	97.21		
Invalid/blank votes	581,736	2.00		730,908	2.79		
Total votes	29,141,979	100.00		26,206,710	100.00		
Registered voters/turnout		–		30,956,076	84.66		
Source: Roi et President, IPU, Quid
