= Pierre Abelin =

French politician (1909–1977)

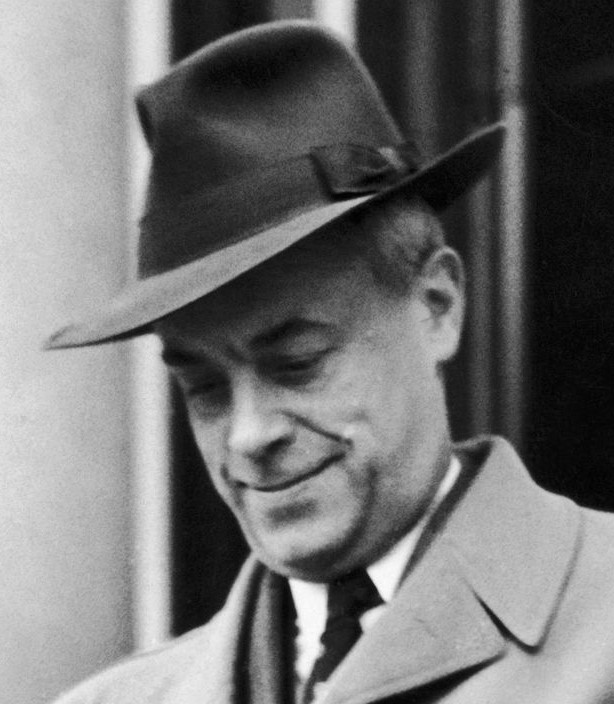
- Abelin in 1952
- Born: Pierre Louis Ernest Armand Abelin; 16 May 1909; Poitiers, France
- Died: 23 May 1977 (aged 68); Poitiers, France

Pierre Louis Ernest Armand Abelin (16 May 1909 – 23 May 1977) was a French Christian Democratic politician, parliamentarian and government minister. Abelin took part in the founding of the Popular Republican Movement (MRP). An adherent of the notion of building a 'third force' in French politics, he retained a staunch anti-Gaullist stance. He later became the general secretary of the Democratic Centre.

Abelin was born and died in Poitiers. He represented the Vienne constituency in the first and second Constituent National Assemblies. He was Member of Parliament from Vienee between 1946 and 1958, and again from 1962 to 1974.

He served as Secretary of State to the Presiding Council November 1947-July 1948, and in September 1948, as Secretary of State for Finances September 1952 to January 1953 and Secretary of State for Economic Affairs March 1955 to January 1956.

Abelin moved to Châtellerault, where he was elected to the municipal council. He later became the mayor of Châtellerault.

Abelin served as president of the High Council on Cooperation with Foreign Countries between 1956 and 1958. On June 17, 1957 he became the president of the Economic Affairs Committee of the National Assembly. He also held positions in the United Nations.

After the split in the Democratic Centre following the 1969 presidential election, the group led by Abelin and Jean Lecanuet (who rejected any reconciliation with the Gaullists) moved to form an alliance with the Radical Party. Abelin became one of the leaders of the new alliance, the Reforming Movement.

He was Minister of Cooperation between May 27, 1974 to January 12, 1976. In his function as minister he initiated the process which would lead to the signing of the Lomé Convention in 1975.

Pierre Abelin was the father of Jean-Pierre Abelin, who (as of 2009) is the mayor of Châtellerault.
