= Centre Democracy and Progress =

Centre Democracy and Progress Centre démocratie et progrès
- Jacques Duhamel
- Vice-president: Joseph Fontanet
- Founded: 1969
- Dissolved: 1976
- Split from: Democratic Centre
- Merged into: Centre of Social Democrats
- Ideology: Christian democracy Centrism
- Political position: Centre-right

Centre Democracy and Progress (French: Centre démocratie et progrès, CDP) was a centrist and Christian democratic political party in France. The party was founded in 1969 by centrists from the Democratic Centre (CD) who supported Gaullist Georges Pompidou in the 1969 presidential election, and joined the coalition of the cabinet of Prime Minister Jacques Chaban-Delmas.

Its goal was to influence governmental policy in a pro-European, liberal and reformist direction. It supported the program of Chaban-Delmas for the advent of a "New Society", in which the relations between social forces would be based on dialogue, and in which there would be less control of society by the state. The CDP supported the unsuccessful presidential candidacy of Chaban-Delmas in the 1974 presidential election.

In the 1973 legislative election, the CDP won 23 seats.

In May 1976, CDP merged with the CD to form the Centre of Social Democrats (CDS), which in 1978 joined the Union for French Democracy (UDF).

== See also ==
- Category:Centre Democracy and Progress politicians
