= 1968 French legislative election =

- 23 June and 30 June 1968

All 487 seats to the French National Assembly 244 seats were needed for a majority
- Turnout: 80.0% (▼0.9 pp) (1st round); 77.8% (▼2.2 pp) (2nd round)
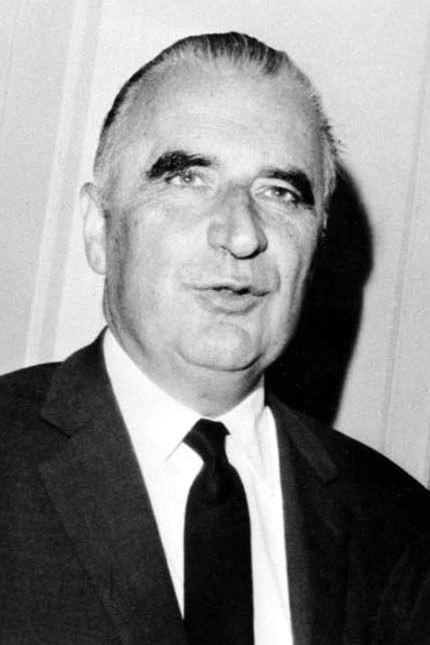

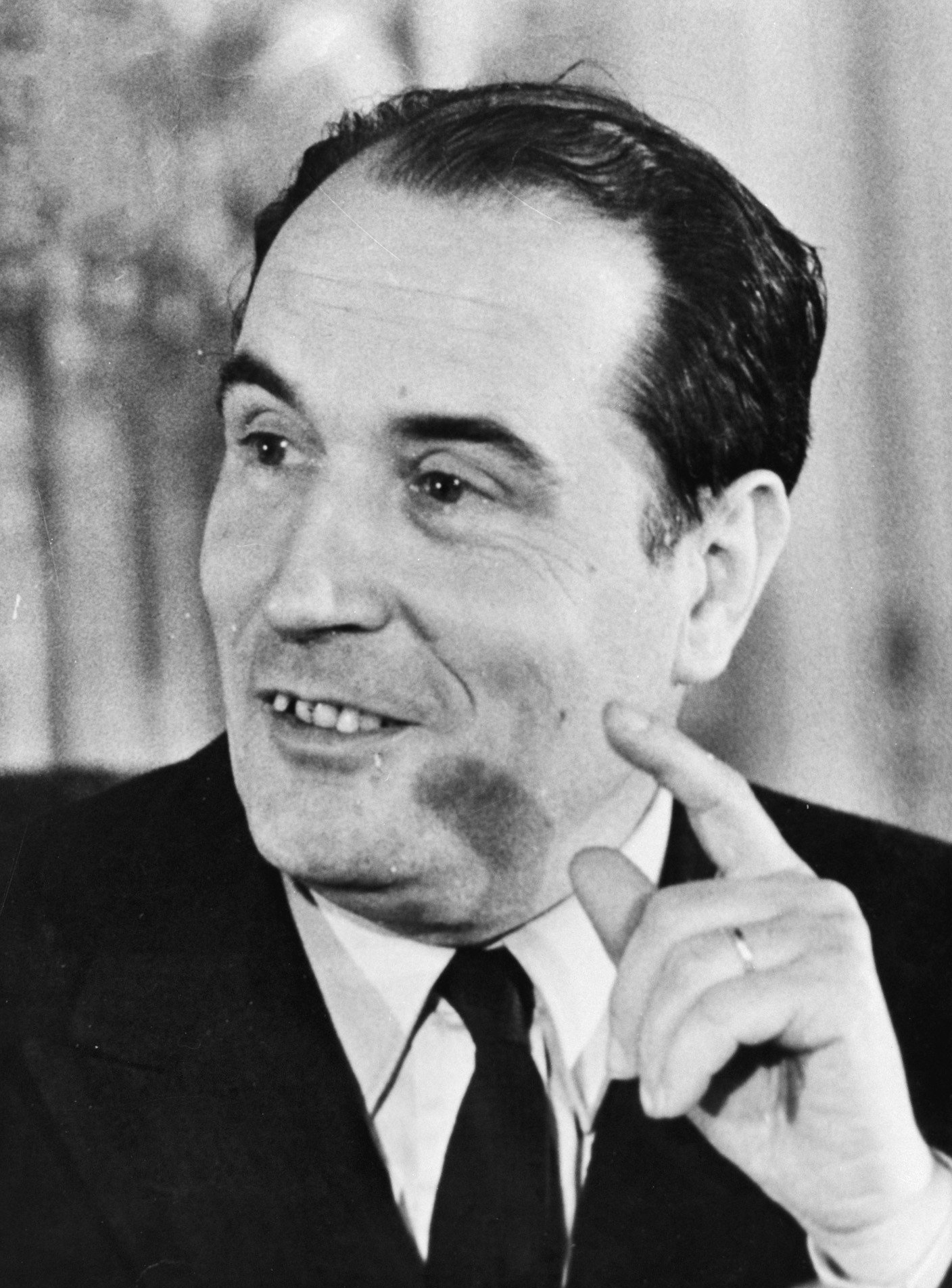

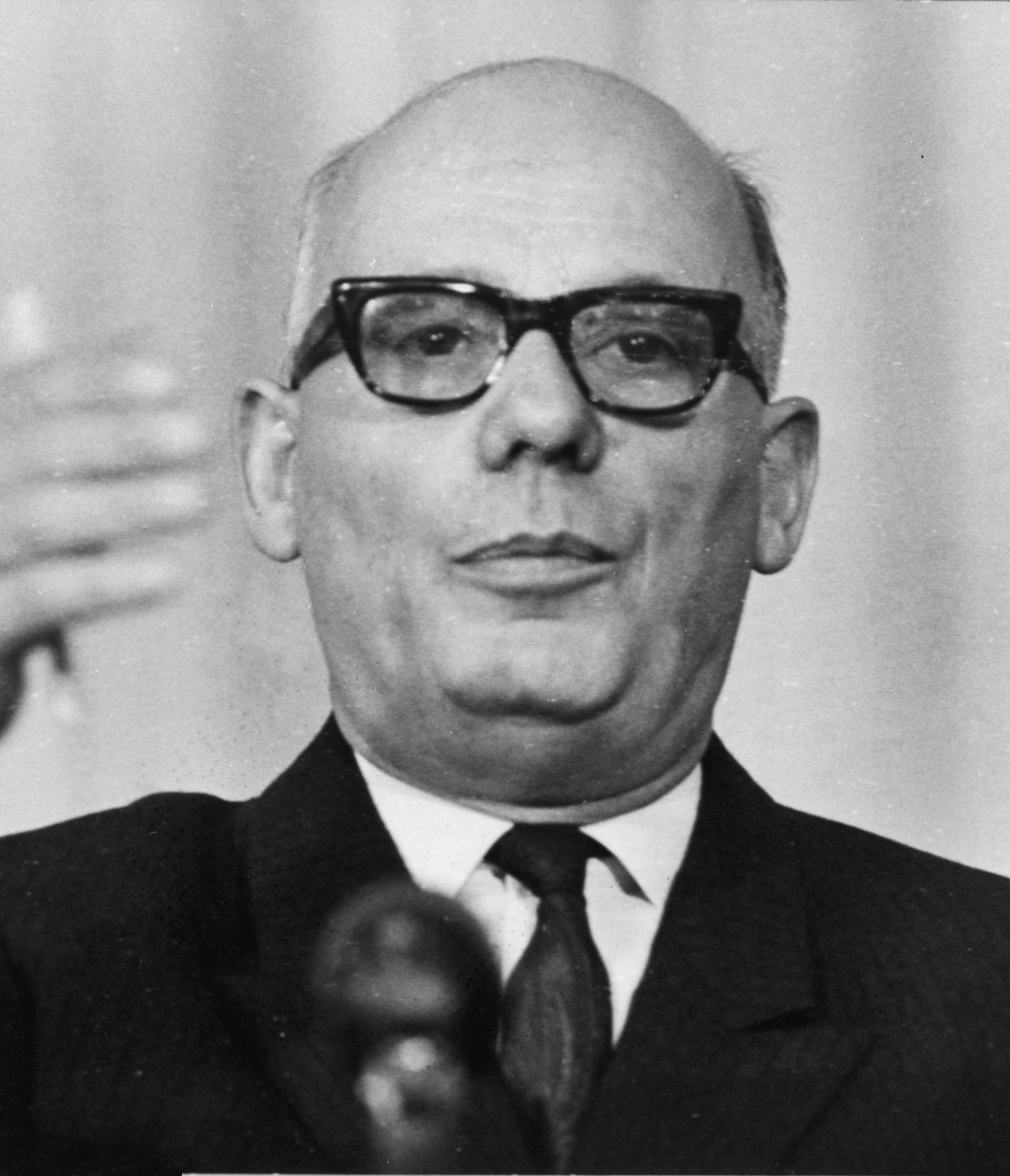

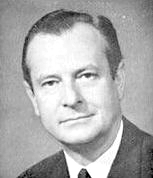
	Majority party	Minority party
Leader	Georges Pompidou	François Mitterrand
Party	UDR	FGDS
Leader's seat	Cantal-2nd	Nièvre-3rd
Last election	243 seats, 37.8%	117 seats, 18.8%
Seats won	354^{*}	57
Seat change	▲111	▼60
Popular vote	9,667,532 (1st round); 6,762,170 (2nd round)	3,660,250 (1st round); 3,097,338 (2nd round)
Percentage	43.65% (1st round); 46.39% (2nd round)	16.53% (1st round); 21.25% (2nd round)
	Third party	Fourth party
Leader	Waldeck Rochet	Camille Laurens (NCIP), Jean Lecanuet (CD, above)
Party	PCF	PDM
Leader's seat	Seine-Saint-Denis	Seine-Maritime (Lecanuet, as Senator)
Last election	73 seats, 22.5%	41 seats (CD)
Seats won	34	33
Seat change	▼39	▼11
Popular vote	4,434,832 (1st round); 2,935,775 (2nd round)	2,289,849 (1st round); 1,141,305 (2nd round)
Percentage	20.02% (1st round); 20.14% (2nd round)	10.34% (1st round); 7.83% (2nd round)
- ^{*} Including Independent Republicans.
PM before election
Georges Pompidou
UDR
Elected PM
Maurice Couve de Murville
UDR

Early legislative elections were held in France on 23 and 30 June 1968, to elect the fourth National Assembly of the Fifth Republic. They were held in the aftermath of the general strike in May 1968. On 30 May 1968, President Charles de Gaulle delivered a radio address after a three-day public absence. During this time, he had gone into temporary exile in Baden-Baden, Germany, to avoid a potential violent overthrow. In his speech, he dissolved the National Assembly and called for legislative elections to restore order.

While the workers returned to their jobs, Prime Minister Georges Pompidou campaigned for the defence of the Republic in the face of what he called the communist threat. He called for the silent majority to make themselves heard. Meanwhile, the leftists missed its opportunity to gain power due to internal division. The Communists reproached François Mitterrand, leader of the Federation of the Democratic and Socialist Left (FGDS), for announcing his presidential candidacy without consulting them and for proposing a provisional government under Pierre Mendès-France. Simultaneously, the far-left and the Unified Socialist Party protested against the overall passivity of the mainstream left-wing parties.

As a result of this leftist infighting, the Gaullist Union for the Defence of the Republic won an absolute parliamentary majority, a first in the history of the French Republic. It was the worst electoral performance of the French left in the post-WWII era. This historic defeat caused the FGDS to disintegrate. However, the crisis severely deteriorated the relationship between the two heads of executive power. Just one month after this major electoral triumph, Georges Pompidou resigned from his post and was replaced as Prime Minister by Maurice Couve de Murville.

== Results ==
Party	First round		Second round		Total seats
Party	Votes	%	Votes	%	Total seats
Union for the Defence of the Republic–Independent Republicans	9,667,532	43.65	6,762,170	46.39	359
French Communist Party	4,434,832	20.02	2,935,775	20.14	34
Federation of the Democratic and Socialist Left	3,660,250	16.53	3,097,338	21.25	57
Progress and Modern Democracy	2,289,489	10.34	1,141,305	7.83	28
Miscellaneous right	917,758	4.14	496,463	3.41	9
Unified Socialist Party and far-left	873,581	3.94	83,777	0.57	0
Miscellaneous left	163,482	0.74	60,584	0.42	0
Technique and Democracy	77,360	0.35			0
Movement for Reform	33,835	0.15			0
Far-right	28,736	0.13			0
Total	22,146,855	100.00	14,577,412	100.00	487
Valid votes	22,146,855	98.29	14,577,412	97.22	
Invalid/blank votes	385,192	1.71	416,762	2.78	
Total votes	22,532,047	100.00	14,994,174	100.00	
Registered voters/turnout	28,181,848	79.95	19,266,974	77.82	
Source: Quid, IPU

=== Parliamentary groups in the National Assembly ===
Graph of the party split among 487 seats.
Party	Seats
Union for the Defence of the Republic Group	292
Independent Republicans Group	61
Federation of the Democratic and Socialist Left Group	57
French Communist Party Group	34
Progress and Modern Democracy Group	33
Non-Inscrits	10
Total	487
Source: IPU
