= Louis Ducatel =

French politician and businessman

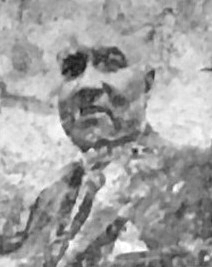
Louis Ducatel

Louis Ducatel (13 March 1902 – 28 June 1999) was a French politician and businessman from the Pas-de-Calais. He is best known for his candidacy in the 1969 French presidential election, where he obtained 1.27% of the vote.
