= Democratic Centre (France) =

Democratic Centre Centre Démocrate
- President: Jean Lecanuet
- Secretary-General: Pierre Abelin
- Founded: 1966
- Dissolved: 1976
- Merger of: MRP, CNIP
- Merged into: Centre of Social Democrats
- Ideology: Christian democracy
- Political position: Centre
- European affiliation: European People's Party
- European Parliament group: Christian Democratic Group
- International affiliation: Christian Democrat International
- Colours: Light blue

Democratic Centre (French: Centre Démocrate, CD) was a Christian-democratic and centrist political party in France. The party existed from 1966 until 1976, when it merged with Centre, Democracy and Progress (CDP) to form the Centre of Social Democrats (CDS). The party's long-time leader was Jean Lecanuet.

== History ==
Democratic Centre was founded on 2 February 1966 by Jean Lecanuet after his 1965 presidential campaign. It came from the merger of the Christian-democratic and centrist Popular Republican Movement (MRP) and the liberal and conservative National Center of Independents and Peasants (CNIP). Its goal was to incarnate a third way between the left-wing opposition (which was Marxist and anticlerical) and the Gaullist coalition (accused of being Eurosceptic, nationalist and authoritarian).

Before the 1967 legislative election, some Christian Democrats left the party to join the Gaullist movement Union of Democrats for the Fifth Republic. One year later, the CNIP left the Democratic Centre.

In 1969, the party called for a "no" vote at the referendum about regionalization and Senate reform which caused the resignation of De Gaulle. At the ensuing 1969 presidential election Democratic Centre supported the candidacy of Alain Poher, chairman of the Senate. Poher reached the second round but was defeated by Georges Pompidou, a former Gaullist Prime Minister. Later in 1969 some centrists joined the presidential majority and the cabinet of Jacques Chaban-Delmas, a reforming Gaullist, and founded the Centre, Democracy and Progress (CDP) as a majority of members split from the Democratic Centre. At the beginning of the 1970s there were therefore two centrist parties: the CDP, a component of the presidential majority, and the Democratic Centre, which remained in opposition.

The Democratic Centre allied with the centrist Radical Party of Jean-Jacques Servan-Schreiber to form the Reform Movement in 1972, Nevertheless, due to the ballot system in the legislative election (the Two-round system), it concluded electoral agreements with the presidential majority in a number of constituencies in the 1973 legislative election. Finally, the Democratic Centre supported the winning presidential candidacy of Valéry Giscard d'Estaing at the 1974 presidential election and was integrated into the presidential majority.

On 23 May 1976, the Democratic Centre rejoined with the CDP to form the Centre of Social Democrats (CDS). The CDS joined on 1 February 1978 the newly founded Union for French Democracy (UDF) of Giscard d'Estaing.

== Election results ==
=== Presidential ===
Presidency of the French Republic
Election	Candidate	First round		Second round		Result
Election	Candidate	Votes	%	Votes	%	Result
1969	Alain Poher	5,268,613	23.31%	7,943,118	41.79%	Lost
