= Maurice Couve de Murville =

Prime Minister of France from 1968 to 1969

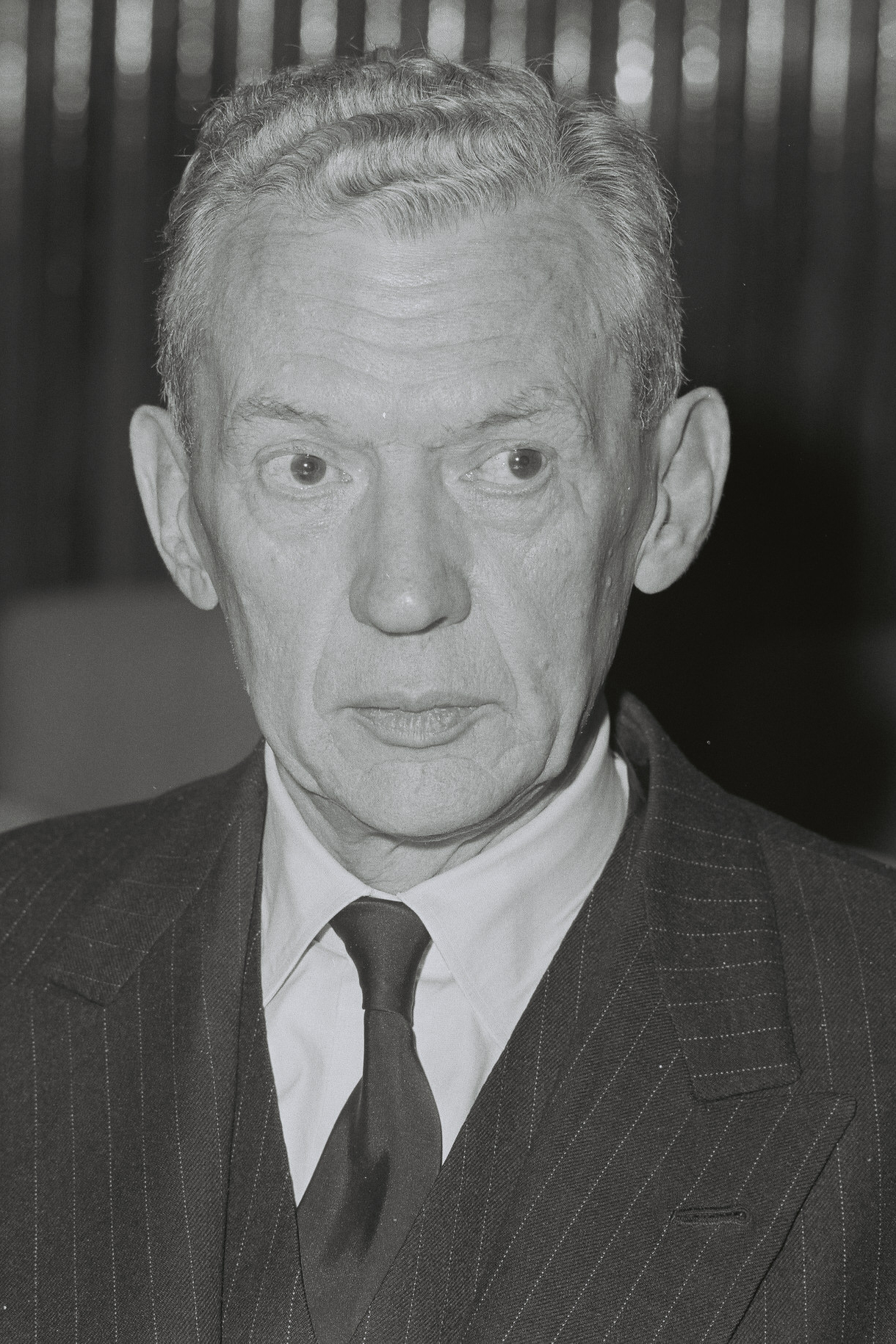
- Couve de Murville in 1967

Prime Minister of France
- In office 10 July 1968 – 20 June 1969
- President: Charles de Gaulle; Alain Poher (Acting)
- Preceded by: Georges Pompidou
- Succeeded by: Jacques Chaban-Delmas

Minister of Economy and Finance
- In office 31 May 1968 – 10 July 1968
- Prime Minister: Georges Pompidou
- Preceded by: Michel Debré
- Succeeded by: François-Xavier Ortoli

Minister of Foreign Affairs
- In office 1 June 1958 – 30 May 1968
- Prime Minister: Charles de Gaulle; Michel Debré; Georges Pompidou
- Preceded by: René Pleven
- Succeeded by: Michel Debré

Senator for Paris
- In office 28 September 1986 – 1 October 1995

Member of the National Assembly for Paris 6th constituency
- In office 11 March 1973 – 1 April 1986
- Preceded by: Raymond Bousquet
- Succeeded by: Constituency abolished
- In office 23 June 1968 – 10 August 1968
- Preceded by: Raymond Bousquet
- Succeeded by: Raymond Bousquet

Personal details
- Born: Maurice Couve; 24 January 1907 Reims, France
- Died: 24 December 1999 (aged 92) Paris, France
- Party: UDR
- Spouse: Jacqueline Schweisguth
- Children: Juliette; Dorothée; Béatrice
- Occupation: Military; Diplomat; Civil Servant; Politician

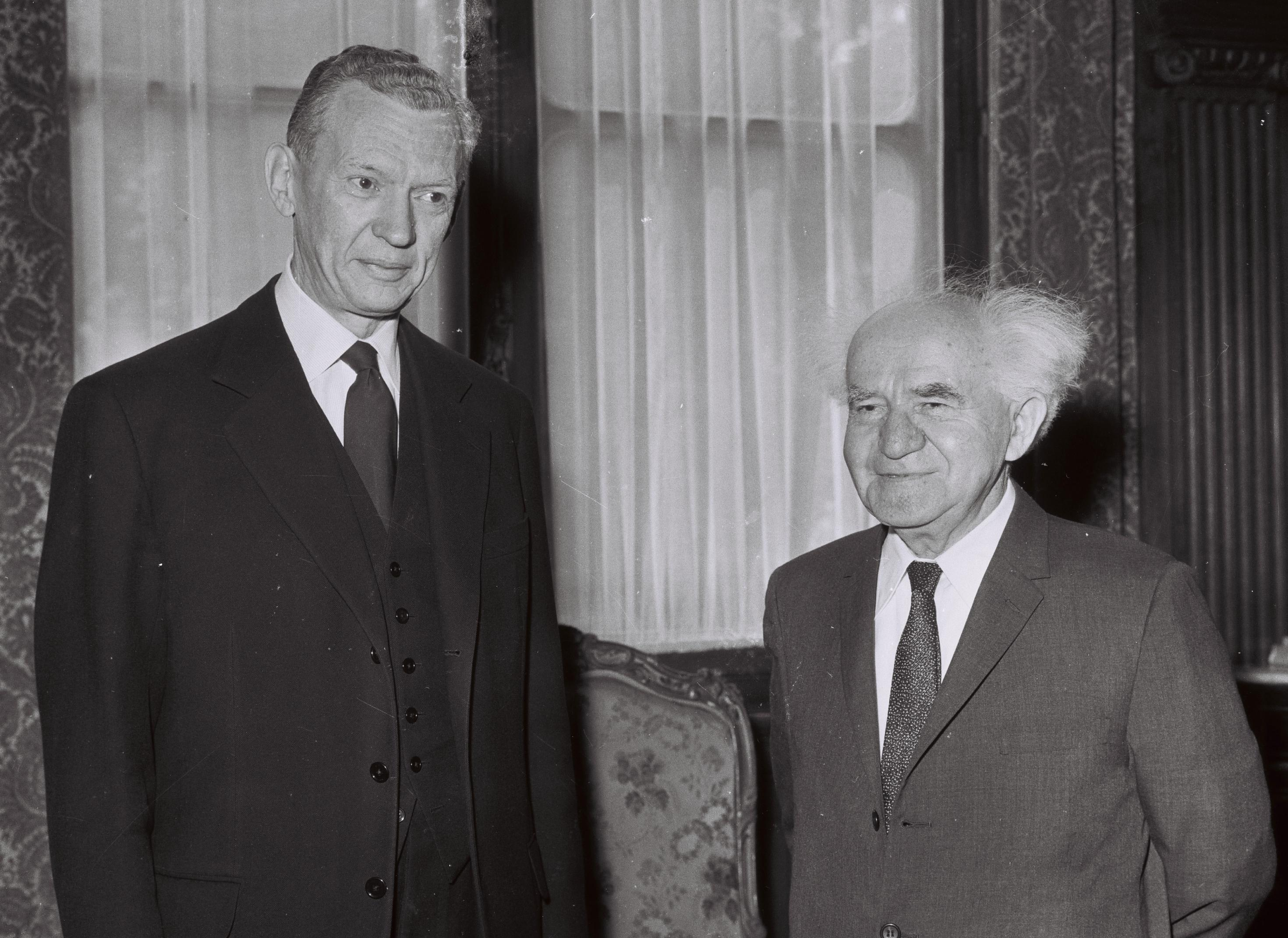
Foreign Minister Maurice Couve de Murville receiving David Ben-Gurion at the Quai d'Orsay in Paris, June 1960

Jacques-Maurice Couve de Murville (French: [mɔʁis kuv də myʁvil, moʁ-]; 24 January 1907 – 24 December 1999) was a French diplomat and politician who was Minister of Foreign Affairs from 1958 to 1968 and Prime Minister from 1968 to 1969 under the presidency of General de Gaulle. As foreign minister he played the leading role in the critical Franco-German treaty of cooperation in 1963, he laid the foundation for the Paris-Bonn axis that was central in building a united Europe.

== Life ==
He was born Maurice Couve (his father acquired the name de Murville in 1925 in Reims. Maurice Couve de Murville, the Roman Catholic Archbishop of Birmingham (1929–2007), was his cousin.

Couve de Murville joined the corps of finance inspectors in 1930, and he became Director of External Finances of the Vichy régime in 1940 in which capacity he sat at the armistice council of Wiesbaden. In March 1943, after the American landing in North Africa, he was one of the few senior officials of Vichy to join the Free French. He left for Algiers, via Spain, where he joined General Henri Giraud. On 7 June 1943, he was named commissioner of finance of the French Committee of National Liberation (CFLN). A few months later, he joined General Charles de Gaulle. In February 1945, he became a member of the Provisional Government of the French Republic (GPRF) with the rank of ambassador attached to the Italian government.

After the war, he occupied several posts as French Ambassador in Cairo (1950 to 1954), at NATO (1954), in Washington (1955 to 1956) and in Bonn (1956 to 1958). When General de Gaulle returned to power in 1958, he became Foreign Minister, a post he retained for ten years until the reshuffle that followed the events of May 1968 where he replaced Finance Minister Michel Debré, keeping this post only a short time. Very soon after the elections, he became a transitional Prime Minister, replacing Georges Pompidou. The following year he was succeeded by Jacques Chaban-Delmas.

Couve de Murville continued his political career first as a UDR deputy, then RPR deputy for Paris until 1986, then as a senator until 1995. He died in Paris at the age of 92 from natural causes.

== Political career ==
Governmental functions

Prime minister : 1968–1969

Minister of Foreign Affairs : 1958–1968

Minister of Economy and Finance : May–July 1968

Chairman of the Foreign Affairs Committee of the National Assembly 1973–1981.

Electoral mandates

Member of the National Assembly of France for Paris : June 1968 (He left his seat when he became a minister) / 1973–1986

Senator of Paris : 1986–1995

== Couve de Murville's Government ==
The cabinet from 10 July 1968 – 20 June 1969

- Maurice Couve de Murville – Prime Minister
- Michel Debré – Minister of Foreign Affairs
- Pierre Messmer – Minister of Armies
- Raymond Marcellin – Minister of the Interior, Public Health, and Population
- François-Xavier Ortoli – Minister of Economy and Finance
- André Bettencourt – Minister of Industry
- Joseph Fontanet – Minister of Labour, Employment, and Population
- René Capitant – Minister of Justice
- Edgar Faure – Minister of National Education
- Henri Duvillard – Minister of Veterans and War Victims
- André Malraux – Minister of Cultural Affairs
- Robert Boulin – Minister of Agriculture
- Albin Chalandon – Minister of Equipment and Housing
- Jean Chamant – Minister of Transport
- Roger Frey – Minister of Relations with Parliament
- Yves Guéna – Minister of Posts and Telecommunications
- Maurice Schumann – Minister of Social Affairs

On 28 April 1969, Jean-Marcel Jeanneney succeeded Capitant as interim Minister of Justice.

== Published works ==
- Une politique étrangère, 1958–1969 (1971). ISBN unknown
- Le Monde en face (1989). ISBN 2-259-02222-7

Political offices
Preceded by André Diethelm	Free French Commissioner for Finance; 1943	Succeeded by Pierre Mendès-France
Preceded by René Pleven	Minister of Foreign Affairs; 1958–1968	Succeeded by Michel Debré
Preceded by Michel Debré	Minister of Economy and Finance; 1968	Succeeded by François-Xavier Ortoli
Preceded by Georges Pompidou	Prime Minister of France; 1968–1969	Succeeded by Jacques Chaban-Delmas
