= Alain Poher =

French politician (1909–1996)

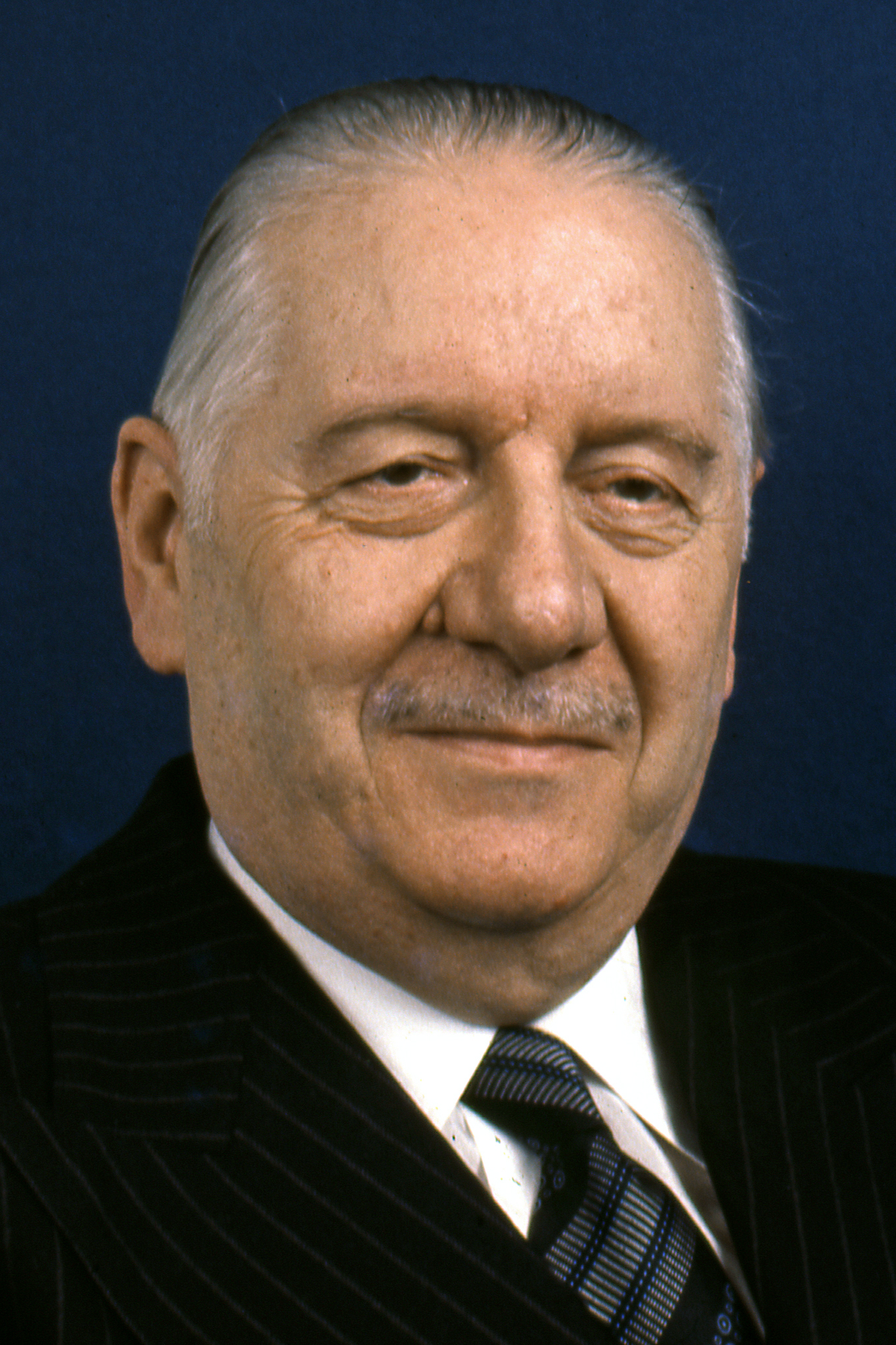
- Poher in the 1980s

President of the Senate
- In office 3 October 1968 – 1 October 1992
- Preceded by: Gaston Monnerville
- Succeeded by: René Monory

Acting President of France
- In office 2 April 1974 – 27 May 1974
- Prime Minister: Pierre Messmer
- Preceded by: Georges Pompidou
- Succeeded by: Valéry Giscard d'Estaing
- In office 28 April 1969 – 20 June 1969
- Prime Minister: Maurice Couve de Murville
- Preceded by: Charles de Gaulle
- Succeeded by: Georges Pompidou

7th President of the European Parliament
- In office 7 March 1966 – 11 March 1969
- Preceded by: Victor Leemans
- Succeeded by: Mario Scelba

Senator
- In office 18 May 1952 – 1 October 1995
- Constituency: Seine-et-Oise (1952–1968); Val-de-Marne (1968–1995)
- In office 8 December 1946 – 7 November 1948
- Constituency: Seine-et-Oise

Mayor of Ablon-sur-Seine
- In office 18 May 1945 – March 1983
- Preceded by: Édouard Désiré Juvigny
- Succeeded by: Jean-Pierre Hermellin

Personal details
- Born: Alain Émile Louis Marie Poher; 17 April 1909 Ablon-sur-Seine, France
- Died: 9 December 1996 (aged 87) 16th arrondissement of Paris, France
- Party: Popular Republican Movement (1946–1966); Democratic Centre (1966–1976); Centre of Social Democrats (1976–1995); Democratic Force (1995–1996)
- Other political affiliations: Union for French Democracy (1978–1996)
- Spouse: Henriette Tugler
- Children: 2
- Education: Mines ParisTech; Sciences Po
- Occupation: Engineer, civil servant
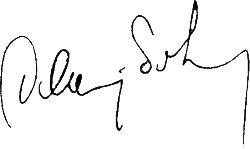
- Signature

Alain Émile Louis Marie Poher (French: [alɛ̃ pɔɛʁ]; 17 April 1909 – 9 December 1996) was a French politician who served as president of the Senate from 1968 to 1992 and as acting president of France in 1969 and 1974. Poher was affiliated with the Popular Republican Movement (MRP) until 1966 and later with the Democratic Centre (CD) and Centre of Social Democrats (CSD), which he joined in 1976.

A native of Ablon-sur-Seine south of Paris, Poher was a longtime member of the Senate (1946–1948; 1952–1995), where he sat first for Seine-et-Oise until 1968 and then Val-de-Marne. He also served as president of the European Parliament from 1966 to 1969. As the longest-serving president of the Senate and the sole unelected president of the Fifth Republic, Poher remained an influential figure in 20th-century French politics. He ran in the 1969 presidential election but was defeated by Georges Pompidou in the second round.

Poher died at the age of 87 in 1996, a year after his retirement from the Senate.

== Early career ==
Poher was born in Ablon-sur-Seine, current-day Val-de-Marne, to a family from Brittany.

He graduated from the Lycée Louis-le-Grand and the Lycée Saint-Louis in Paris and later studied law. On 19 August 1938 he married Henriette Tugler (1907–2004) in La Baule-Escoublac, with whom he had two daughters, Marie-Agnès (born 1939) and Marie-Thérèse (1944–2002).

His administrative career began in 1938 when he became a junior executive officer at the Ministry of Finance. In World War II, he was wounded in combat after being sent to the front lines to defend against the German invasion. Later, he became a member of the French Resistance against Nazi Germany.

In the aftermath of the Liberation of France, he served in several political positions prior to entering the Senate: chairman at the Ministry of Finance's Liberation Committee (from 20 July 1944); head of Social Services, Ministry of Finance (from 1 January 1945); and Mayor of Ablon-sur-Seine (from 18 May 1945).

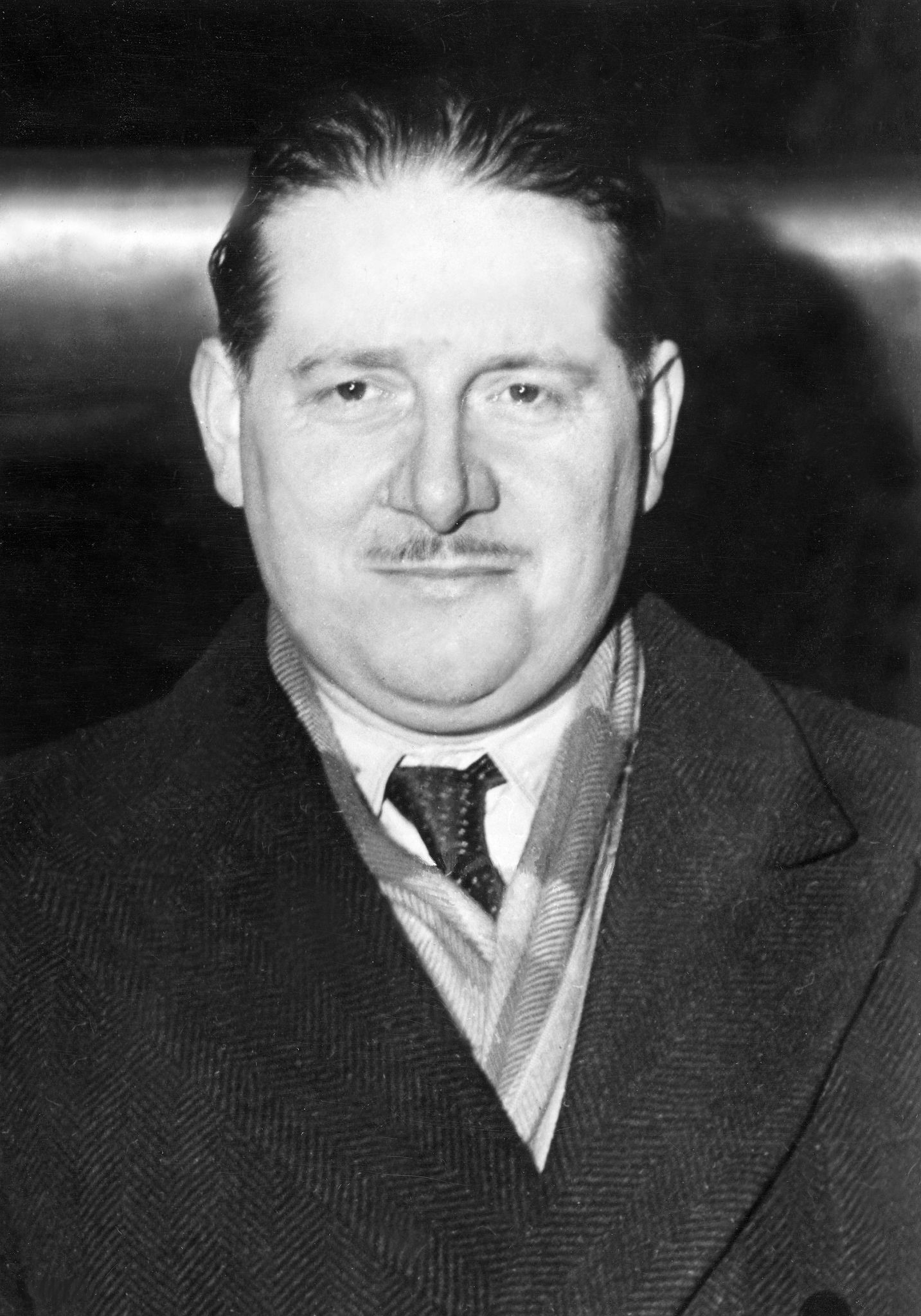
Alain Poher in February 1949 as French General Commissioner for German and Austrian Affairs

He was also General Commissioner for German and Austrian Affairs (1948–1950); Secretary of State for the Budget in the second government of Prime Minister Robert Schuman and first government of Prime Minister Henri Queuille (1948); Secretary of State for the Armed Forces (Navy) in the government of Prime Minister Félix Gaillard (1957–1958); and president of the Association des maires de France or AMF (1974–1983).

A longtime ally and political protégé of Schuman, Poher was reelected to the Senate in 1952, where he remained for over 40 years, until 1995. As a Senator, he continued to serve in government (as Secretary of State for the Armed Forces, tasked with the Navy, in the government of Prime Minister Félix Gaillard in the late 1950s), in addition to his duties as mayor of his home town, Ablon-sur-Seine. Like Schuman, he was known for strongly pro-European integration positions; he served as President of the European Parliament from 1966 to 1969.

== President of the Senate ==
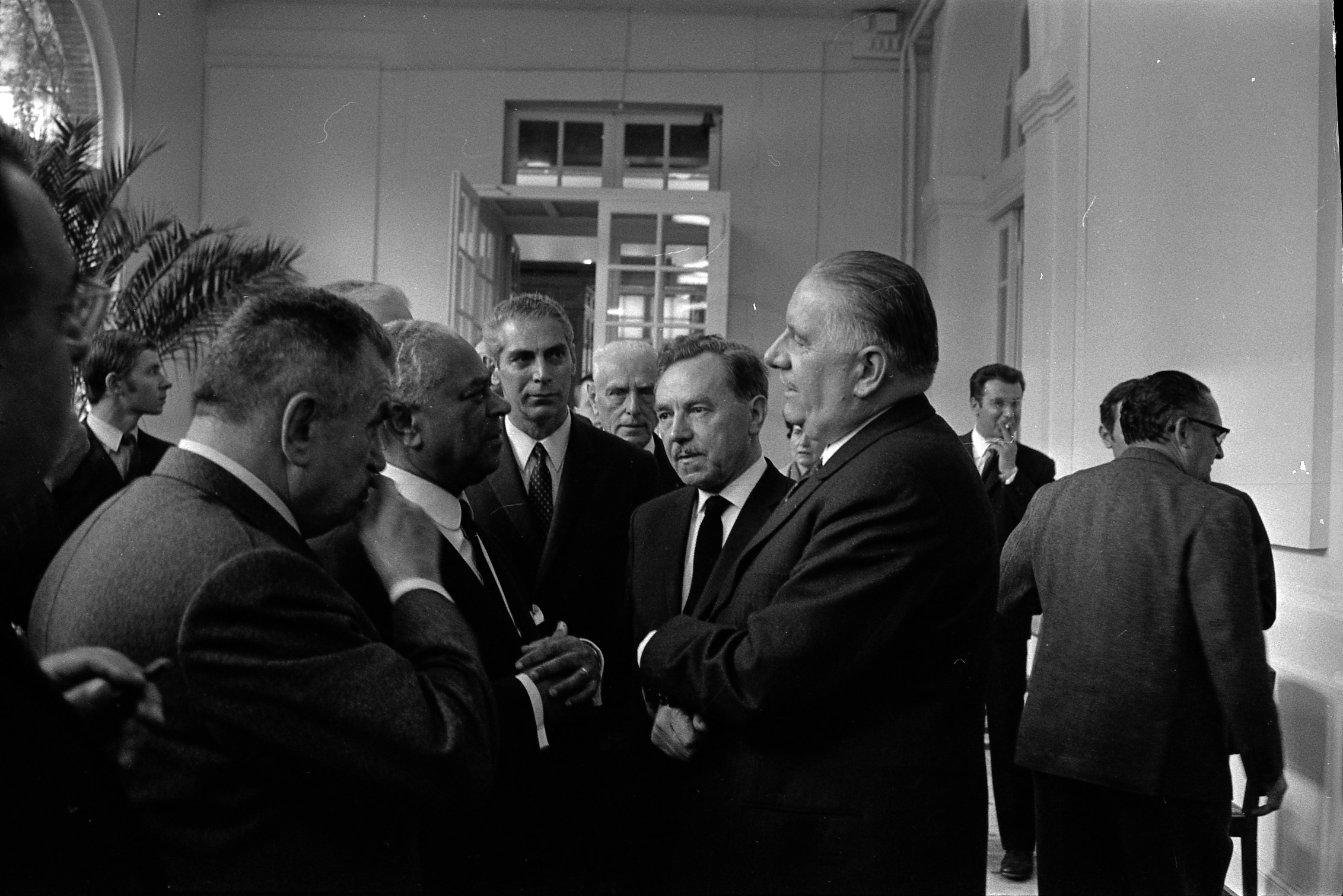
Poher (right) speaking with Gaston Monnerville, his predecessor as Senate President, in April 1969.

During his tenure, Poher served with the Gaullist government of Prime Minister Maurice Couve de Murville, Charles de Gaulle's close ally. Some even referred to this period as the first cohabitation. Despite sharp political differences, Poher was widely credited for model cooperation with the government.

=== Acting President of France ===
According to the order of succession established by the Constitution of the Fifth Republic, the President of the Senate assumes the nation's presidential powers and duties following the president's death or resignation; the officeholder thus becomes ad interim head of state until the next early presidential election.

Poher's first service as interim president came on 29 April 1969, when Charles de Gaulle resigned. Previously he was one of Charles de Gaulle's most notable political opponents and played a key role in the successful "no" campaign in the final referendum of his presidency. During his interim presidency, Poher continued to serve as Senate President. However, he resided during this time in the Élysée Palace as acting president.

Initially, Poher tried to recruit General Marie-Pierre Kœnig as a candidate for the presidency and offered him his full support. Kœnig, however, declined to run, citing his poor health and stating that one general should not replace another general as the head of state. After Kœnig's refusal, Poher himself announced his candidacy. Due to favourable polls, he was viewed as the strongest opponent to Georges Pompidou and the only non-Gaullist candidate who had a real opportunity to win the election. The lack of a longstanding party machine nevertheless hurt his chances.

During his short term in office Poher's main task was overseeing the incoming election, in which he himself participated. However, during his tenure he also took some major initiatives; notably, he fired longtime Charles de Gaulle confidant Jacques Foccart, a Secretary-General for African Affairs as well as, unofficially, the chief of the Gaullist secret services, who returned to the Élysée after Pompidou's election.

Poher also ordered the directors of France's state-controlled radio and television networks to keep public media politically neutral and refrain from acting in the interest of any particular party. His successors followed this precedent. He also ordered the redeployment of a large police force in Paris in the wake of the May 68 events. His accomplishments helped Poher, previously largely unknown to the public, develop significant popularity during his interim presidency, despite his defeat in the election.

Regarding the usage of the Force de dissuasion in 1969, he later wrote: "As head of the armed forces, I should have received the famous envelope containing the 'instructions for use' of the atomic weapon. However, General de Gaulle's chief of the military staff (...) had disappeared. After a stubborn search which lasted three days, a period during which France was deprived of any possibility of nuclear response, he was finally found."

He served again as ad interim head of state in 1974 after Pompidou died in office. This time, however, he did not run for his own term and stepped down after Valéry Giscard d'Estaing was elected against François Mitterrand.

== Political career ==
- Interim President of the French Republic: 28 April – 20 June 1969, 2 April – 27 May 1974

Government functions

- Secretary of State for the Budget: 5 September – 20 November 1948
- Secretary of State for the Navy: 11 November 1957 – 14 May 1958

Electoral mandates

European Parliament

- President of the European Parliament: 1966–1969

Senate

- Senator for Seine-et-Oise, Val-de-Marne: 1946–1948, 1952–1995
- President of the Senate of France: 1968–1992

Local

- Mayor of Ablon-sur-Seine: 1945–1983

Political offices
Preceded by Victor Leemans	President of the European Parliament; 1966–1969	Succeeded by Mario Scelba
Preceded by Gaston Monnerville	President of the French Senate; 1968–1992	Succeeded by René Monory
Preceded by Charles de Gaulle	President of France; Acting; 1969	Succeeded by Georges Pompidou
Preceded by Georges Pompidou	President of France; Acting; 1974	Succeeded by Valéry Giscard d'Estaing
Regnal titles
Preceded by Charles de Gaulle	Co-Prince of Andorra; Acting; 1969; With Ramon Malla Call	Succeeded by Georges Pompidou
Preceded by Georges Pompidou	Co-Prince of Andorra; Acting; 1974; With Joan Martí i Alanis	Succeeded by Valéry Giscard d'Estaing
