= 1969 French constitutional referendum =

Failed constitutional referendum on decentralization

- 27 April 1969
- Do you approve of the bill submitted to the French people by the President of the Republic and relating to the creation of regions and the reform of the Senate?
- Outcome: The constitutional amendments are rejected.; President Charles de Gaulle resigns.

Results
Choice	Votes	%
Yes	10,901,753	47.59%
No	12,007,102	52.41%
Valid votes	22,908,855	97.27%
Invalid or blank votes	643,756	2.73%
Total votes	23,552,611	100.00%
Registered voters/turnout	29,392,390	80.13%
- Results by department

A constitutional referendum was held in France on 27 April 1969. The referendum proposed government decentralization and changes to the Senate. These reforms were rejected by 52.4% of voters, leading to President Charles de Gaulle's resignation.

== Proposals ==
=== Government decentralization ===
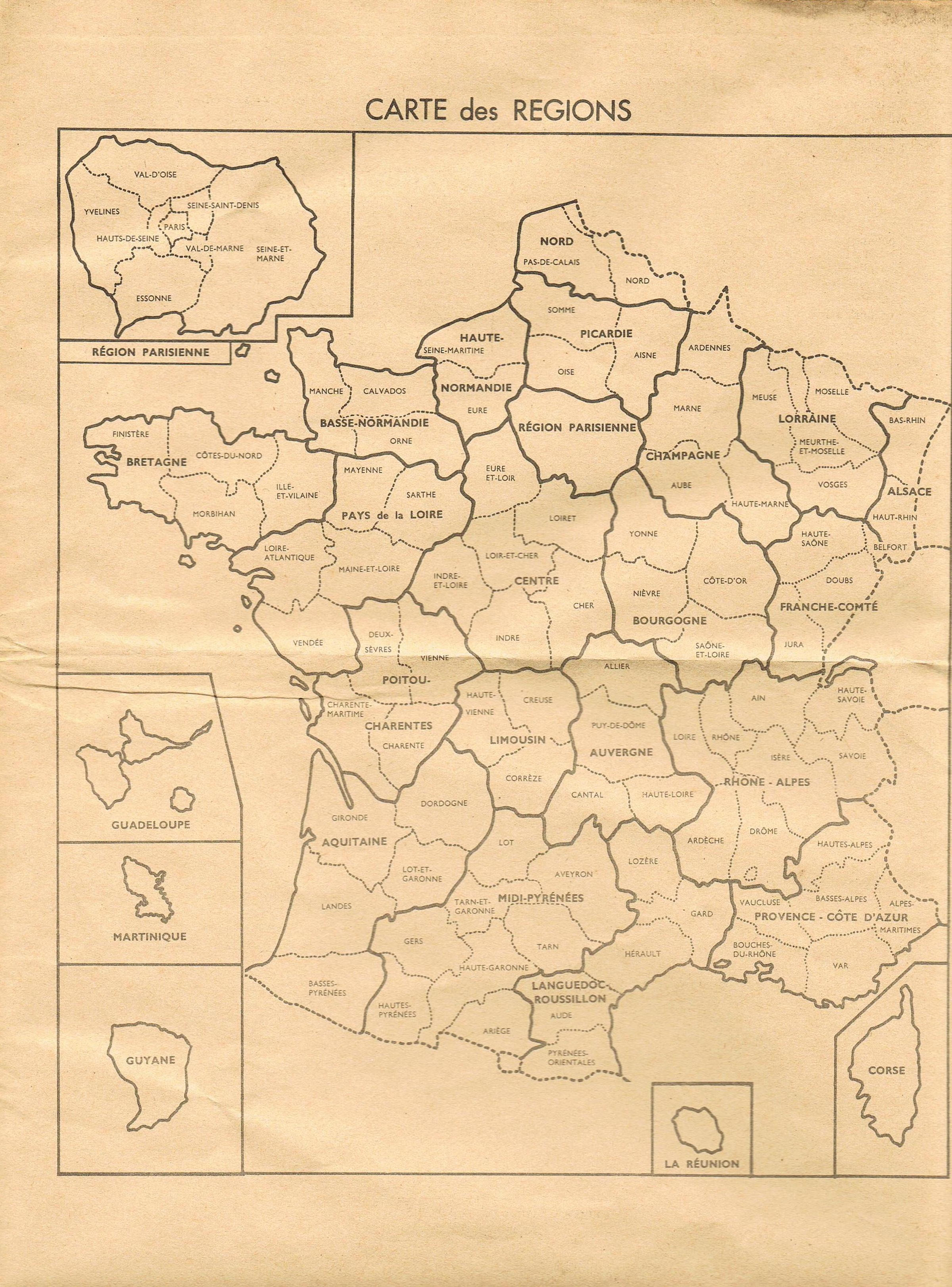
The regions, as intended by the reform

The first part of the project aimed to classify the existence of regions in the constitution as territorial collectivities. That would affect the regional circonscriptions created in 1960, and Corsica.

The Region's jurisdiction would be enlarged, primarily with taking control of public utilities, housing and urbanization. In order to exercise these new powers, the Region would be able to borrow money, enter into contracts, create, manage or grant public organizations and enter into agreements with other Regions.

The Regional Councils would be composed of:

- three-fifths elected regional députés (deputies) and territorial regional councillors, elected by the General Councils (one per department, for three years) and by the municipal councils or their délégués, for six years;
- two-fifths regional councillors, designated by representative agencies, for six years.

Special arrangements would be taken for the Parisian Region, Corsica and the overseas departments.

=== Senate reform ===
The second part of the project would combine the Senate and the Economic and Social Council into one new Senate having a consultative function and no blocking power. The necessity of a second consultative house representing the territorial collectivities and economic, familial and intellectual organizations had been announced by de Gaulle in his Bayeux speech, on 16 June 1946, and mentioned again during his presidency and to Alain Peyrefitte. The main changes in the role of the Senate would be the following:

- The acting president of the Republic, in case of incapacity or death of the president, would be the Prime Minister rather than the President of the Senate;
- Declaration of war and prorogation of a state of siege would be authorized by the National Assembly;
- Senators would no longer be able to make new laws;
- Bills of law would first be presented to the Senate, which would be able to propose their adoption, rejection, or amendment, before they are put before the National Assembly; after this, the Government or the National Assembly would be able to send them back to the Senate;
- Constitutional amendments would be passed only by an absolute majority in the National Assembly before being voted on in a national referendum; they would then be submitted once more to the National Assembly, which would be able finally to ratify them only by a two-thirds majority of its members;
- Senators would no longer be allowed to question the government;
- In matters concerning the High Court of Justice, only a meeting of senators representing Territorial Collectivities would have a role (with the National Assembly), rather than the Senate.

Senators would be elected for six years, with elections held for half the house every three years (as has been the case since 2003). They would have to be over twenty-three, rather than the then minimum age of thirty-five.

The Senate's composition would be the following:

- 173 senators representing territorial collectivities of metropolitan France (160) and its overseas territories (DOM: 7, TOM: 6), elected, the regions being the electoral constituencies, by deputies, territorial regional councilors, general councilors and representatives of the municipal councils;
- 4 senators representing French citizens residing abroad, appointed by the High Council of French Citizens Abroad;
- 146 senators representing economic, social and cultural activities, appointed by representative agencies:
  - 42 senators for the working-class;
  - 30 for farmers;
  - 36 for businesses;
  - 10 for families;
  - 8 for accredited professionals;
  - 8 for higher education and research;
  - 12 for social and cultural activities.

== Campaign ==
President Charles de Gaulle threatened to resign if the reforms were rejected. The opposition urged people to vote no, and the president was equally hindered by popular former right-wing prime minister Georges Pompidou, who would stand as a presidential candidate if de Gaulle were to leave, reducing the fear of a power vacuum felt by the right-wing Gaullist electorate. Former finance minister Valéry Giscard d'Estaing also announced that he would not vote in favour of the reforms. Only the Gaullist Union of Democrats for the Republic campaigned for a yes.

== Results ==
Results of the referendum by administrative division

Choice	Metropolitan France		Total	
Choice	Votes	%	Votes	%
For	10,512,469	46.8	10,901,753	47.6
Against	11,945,149	53.2	12,007,102	52.4
Invalid/blank votes	635,678	–	643,756	–
Total	23,093,296	100	23,552,611	100
Registered voters	28,655,692	–	29,392,390	–
Source: Nohlen & Stöver

== Aftermath ==
Following the referendum's failure, de Gaulle's office published a statement announcing his resignation at eleven past midnight on 28 April:

Je cesse d'exercer mes fonctions de président de la République. Cette décision prend effet aujourd'hui à midi.
I will cease to exercise my functions as president of the Republic. This decision will take effect today at midday.

Alain Poher, president of the Senate, became acting president. De Gaulle's resignation triggered the 1969 presidential election, which was won by Georges Pompidou.
