= Progress and Modern Democracy =

French Christian democratic party

Progress and Modern Democracy Progrès et démocratie moderne
- Abbreviation: PDM
- Ideology: Christian democracy
- Political position: Centre

Progress and Modern Democracy (French: Progrès et démocratie moderne PDM) was a French centrist political group of the National Assembly elected in 1968 after the May 1968 crisis. It was composed of the Christian democrat deputies belonging to the Democratic Centre and the conservatives of the National Centre of Independents and Peasants.
