= 1974 French presidential election =

- 5 May 1974 (first round); 19 May 1974 (second round)
- Turnout: 84.23% (first round); 87.33% (second round)
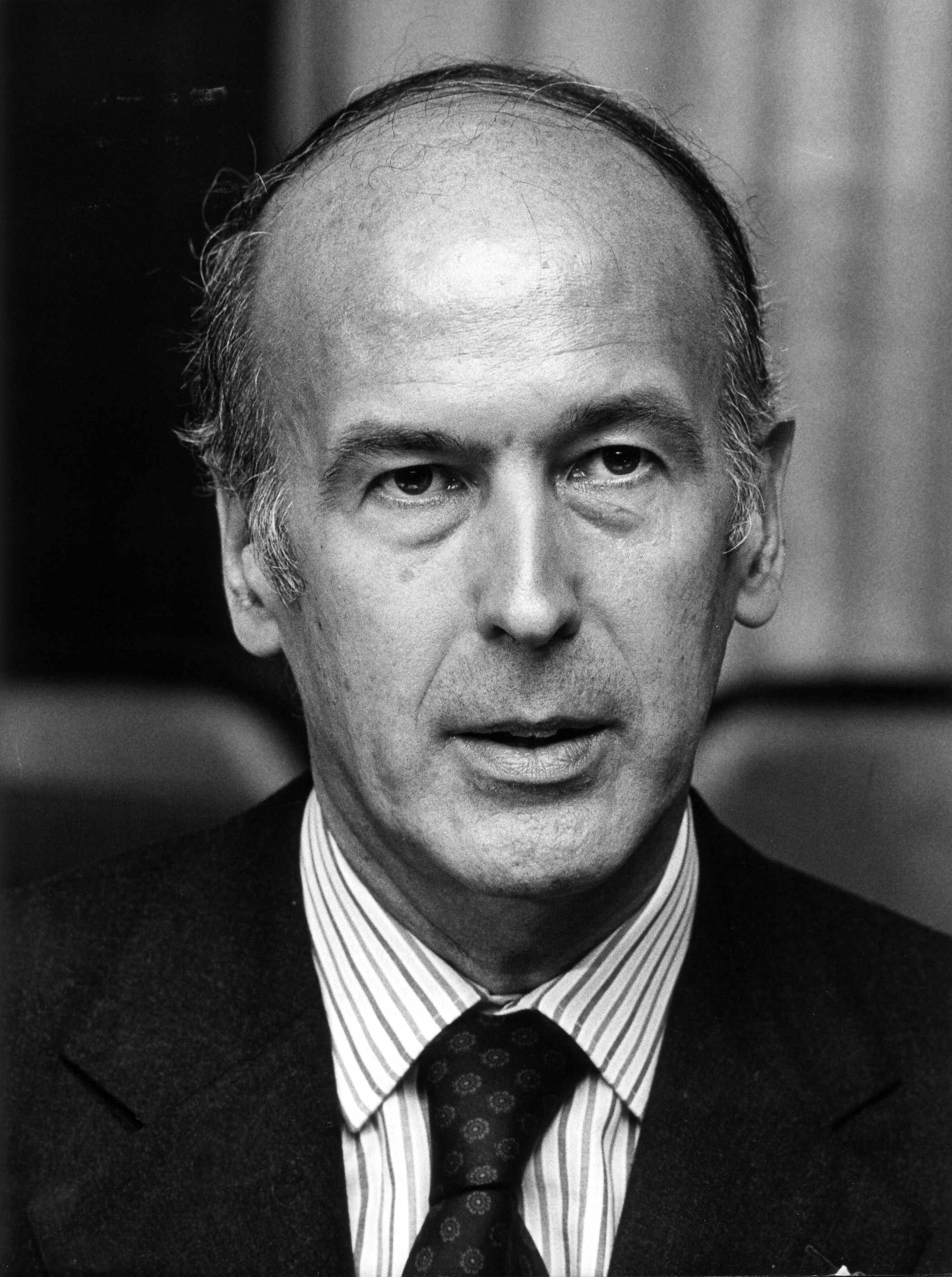

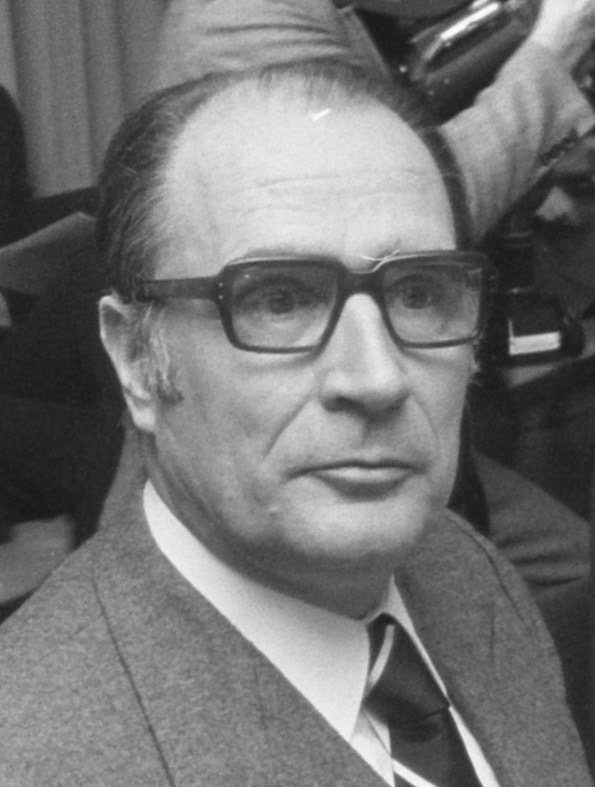
Candidate	Valéry Giscard d'Estaing	François Mitterrand
Party	RI	PS
Popular vote	13,396,203	12,971,604
Percentage	50.81%	49.19%
President before election
Alain Poher
(acting President after Georges Pompidou died in April)
CD
Elected President
Valéry Giscard d'Estaing
RI

Presidential elections were held in France in 1974, following the death of President Georges Pompidou. They went to a second round, and were won by Valéry Giscard d'Estaing by a margin of 1.6%. It is to date the closest presidential election in French history.

== Campaign ==
In 1969, Georges Pompidou, formerly Prime Minister under the presidency of Charles de Gaulle, was elected President of France for a seven-year term. However, he died in office on 2 April 1974, and the French voters were called to elect his successor. The political classes were caught unaware by Pompidou's death.

On the Left, the Socialist Party (PS), the French Communist Party (PCF), and the Movement of Left Radicals (MRG) campaigned for the Programme commun that they agreed in 1972. Whilst the PCF was the main force of this coalition (at least in terms of popular support), they united behind the candidacy of the PS leader François Mitterrand. Indeed, they thought the "Union of Left" could not win if it was led by a Communist in the presidential race. The fear of communism was often an argument used by the French Right to win elections. Furthermore, Mitterrand had succeeded in forcing an unexpected second ballot when he was candidate in 1965 against General De Gaulle. Only two smaller Trotskyist parties refused to support Mitterrand and the Common Program, as well as the Social Democratic Party founded by a split of Socialist elects who disapproved the alliance with the PCF. Arlette Laguiller from Workers' Struggle became the first female candidate on the ballot paper for a French presidential election. For the first time since the beginning of the Fifth Republic in 1958, the Left had a serious chance of victory.

The situation in the "Presidential Majority" was very confused: no "natural candidate" had appeared. Prime Minister Pierre Messmer had announced he would run if he was the only candidate of the majority. This condition being not satisfied, he withdrew. Four men declared their will to run: former Gaullist Prime Minister Jacques Chaban-Delmas, the Chairman of the National Assembly Edgar Faure, the former Craftsmen and Shopkeepers Minister representing the ultra-conservative wing of the Gaullist Party Jean Royer, and finally the Economy Minister and leader of the Independent Republicans Valéry Giscard d'Estaing. Quickly, Faure withdrew and the real competition on the Right was between Chaban-Delmas and Giscard d'Estaing.

Chaban-Delmas conveyed an image of being a reformist Gaullist and invoked his proposals for a "New Society", which he had tried to apply when he led the cabinet (from 1969 to 1972), but he was supported by the "Barons of Gaullism" who held the bulk of ministerial offices for 16 years. His challengers denounced the continuation of the UDR-state, that is to say the appropriation of the state by the Gaullist Party.

Giscard d'Estaing portrayed himself as "the change in the continuity", a "modern turn" for the French politics, in the incumbent majority and more reassuring for moderate voters than the Common Program which was characterised as a collectivist project. He benefited from the divisions in the UDR. Indeed, 43 Gaullist personalities close to Pompidou and led by the young Interior Minister Jacques Chirac published an appeal insinuating that Giscard d'Estaing was more likely than Chaban-Delmas to defeat Mitterrand. As a result, the left-wing candidate faced the leader of the Independent Republicans in a very competitive run-off.

For the first time in the history of the French presidential elections, a Radio-TV-debate between the two finalists was organized. Mitterrand presented his competitor as representing the elites who pursued unfair policies, while Giscard d'Estaing criticized his opponent to be "a man of the past". The turnout reached a record of over 87% and Giscard was elected with a margin of only 424,599 votes. He nominated Chirac as Prime Minister.

Mitterrand would later be elected as a President seven years later in 1981 after defeating d'Estaing.

== Result ==
Candidate	Party	First round		Second round	
Candidate	Party	Votes	%	Votes	%
François Mitterrand	Socialist Party	11,044,373	43.25	12,971,604	49.19
Valéry Giscard d'Estaing	National Federation of the Independent Republicans	8,326,774	32.60	13,396,203	50.81
Jacques Chaban-Delmas	Union of Democrats for the Republic	3,857,728	15.11		
Jean Royer	Independent right-wing conservative	810,540	3.17		
Arlette Laguiller	Workers' Struggle	595,247	2.33		
René Dumont	Independent environmentalist	337,800	1.32		
Jean-Marie Le Pen	National Front	190,921	0.75		
Émile Muller	Democratic Socialist Movement	176,279	0.69		
Alain Krivine	Revolutionary Communist Front	93,990	0.37		
Bertrand Renouvin	New French Action	43,722	0.17		
Jean-Claude Sebag	European Federalist Movement	42,007	0.16		
Guy Héraud	European federalist	19,255	0.08		
Total		25,538,636	100.00	26,367,807	100.00
Valid votes		25,538,636	99.08	26,367,807	98.66
Invalid/blank votes		237,107	0.92	356,788	1.34
Total votes		25,775,743	100.00	26,724,595	100.00
Registered voters/turnout		30,602,953	84.23	30,600,775	87.33
Source: Constitutional Court, Constitutional Court

== See also ==
- President of France
- Politics of France
- French presidential elections under the Fifth Republic
