= 1969 French presidential election =

- 1 June 1969 (first round); 15 June 1969 (second round)
- Turnout: 77.59% (first round); 68.85% (second round)
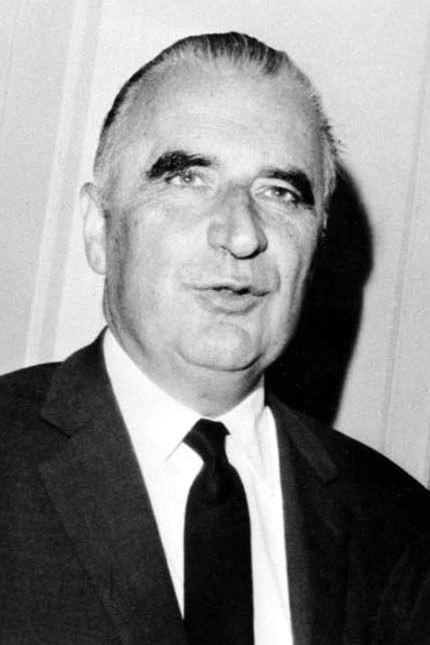

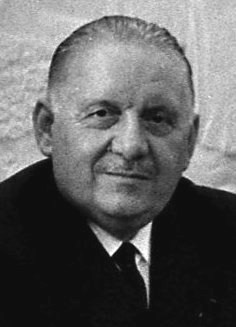
Candidate	Georges Pompidou	Alain Poher
Party	UDR	CD
Popular vote	11,064,371	7,943,118
Percentage	58.21%	41.79%
President before election
Alain Poher
(acting President after Charles de Gaulle resigned in April)
CD
Elected President
Georges Pompidou
UDR

Presidential elections were held in France on 1 June 1969, with a second round on 15 June. They were triggered by the resignation of President Charles de Gaulle on 28 April 1969.

== Background ==
Incumbent president Charles de Gaulle proposed a referendum on government decentralisation and a reform of the Senate. In the referendum on 27 April, 53.5% of voters rejected the proposed amendments. Following the announcement of the results, De Gaulle resigned as president at noon the following day, having threatened to do so if the referendum had failed.

== Candidates ==
In the presidential election, the Gaullist Party (Union of Democrats for the Republic, UDR) was represented by former Prime Minister Georges Pompidou. He was very popular in the conservative electorate due to economic growth when he led the cabinet (from 1962 to 1968) and his role in the settlement of the May 68 crisis and winning the June 1968 legislative campaign. In his presidential campaign, he obtained the support of the Independent Republicans and their leader Valéry Giscard d'Estaing, who had voted "no" in the referendum.

The left-wing French Communist Party (PCF) proposed to the French Section of the Workers' International (SFIO, later formed the Socialist Party) to present a candidate with a common programme, but the SFIO refused. The Left was severely divided in this election. The PCF candidate was Jacques Duclos, one of the historical leaders of the party. The mayor of Marseille, Gaston Defferre, was the SFIO candidate and campaigned with Pierre Mendès France, who would have become Prime Minister had Defferre been elected to the presidency. This candidacy was the first – and so far, only – dual "ticket" in a French presidential election. But Defferre's campaign was weakened by the decision of centrist interim President Alain Poher to run. As Chairman of the Senate, Poher had led the "no" campaign in the referendum. The success of the "no" campaign gave him the legitimacy to run for the presidency and he rallied a large swathe of centre-right and centre-left voters.

Michel Rocard and Alain Krivine stood as candidates expressing the ideas of the May 1968 movements, though the Trotskyist Krivine took a far more radical stance.

== First round ==
The first round of voting was held on 1 June 1969. Out of a total of 28,774,041 eligible voters, participation in the first round hovered around 78% of the electorate. Pompidou and Poher won the right to compete in the second round by claiming 43.9% and 23.4% of the vote respectively.

== Second round ==
The second round saw Pompidou facing Poher. None of the left-wing candidates reached the second round, despite a good campaign and the result for Duclos, who scored the best ever result for a Communist in a presidential election. The Socialists supported reluctantly the centrist Chairman of the Senate. The Communists refused to choose and used a slogan which was equivalent to the phrase "It's six of one and half a dozen of the other" (c'est bonnet blanc et blanc bonnet).

The second round was held on 15 June 1969. About 69% of eligible voters participated. Pompidou was elected President of France with a comfortable majority of more than 58%.

== Results ==
Candidate	Party	First round		Second round	
Candidate	Party	Votes	%	Votes	%
Georges Pompidou	Union of Democrats for the Republic	10,051,783	44.47	11,064,371	58.21
Alain Poher	Democratic Centre	5,268,613	23.31	7,943,118	41.79
Jacques Duclos	French Communist Party	4,808,285	21.27		
Gaston Defferre	French Section of the Workers' International	1,133,222	5.01		
Michel Rocard	Unified Socialist Party	816,470	3.61		
Louis Ducatel	Miscellaneous left	286,447	1.27		
Alain Krivine	Communist League	239,104	1.06		
Total		22,603,924	100.00	19,007,489	100.00
Valid votes		22,603,924	98.71	19,007,489	93.58
Invalid/blank votes		295,036	1.29	1,303,798	6.42
Total votes		22,898,960	100.00	20,311,287	100.00
Registered voters/turnout		29,513,361	77.59	29,500,334	68.85
Source: Constitutional Court, Constitutional Court

== See also ==
- President of France
- Politics of France
- French presidential elections under the Fifth Republic
