= Jean Lecanuet =

French politician

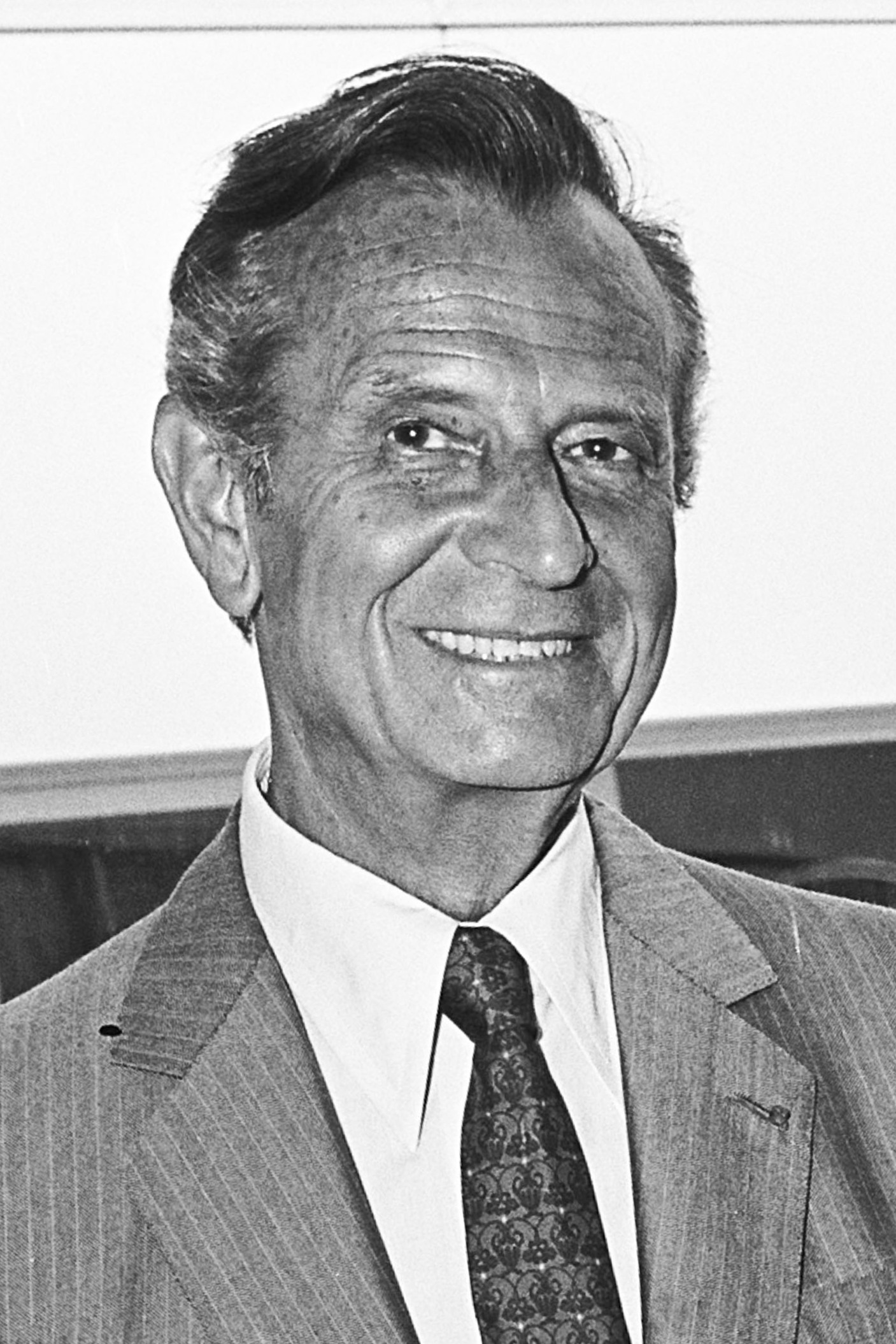
- Lecanuet in 1984

Minister of Justice
- In office 28 May 1974 – 25 August 1976
- President: Valéry Giscard d'Estaing
- Prime Minister: Jacques Chirac
- Preceded by: Jean Taittinger
- Succeeded by: Olivier Guichard

Mayor of Rouen
- In office 4 April 1968 – 22 February 1993
- Preceded by: Bernard Tissot
- Succeeded by: François Gautier

President of the Union for French Democracy
- In office 1 February 1978 – 30 June 1988
- Preceded by: Position established
- Succeeded by: Valéry Giscard d'Estaing

Personal details
- Born: Jean Adrien François Lecanuet; 4 March 1920 Rouen, France
- Died: 22 February 1993 (aged 72) Neuilly-sur-Seine, France
- Party: Popular Republican Movement (1944-1965); Democratic Centre (1966-1976); Centre of Social Democrats (1976-1993); Union for French Democracy (1978-1993)
- Other political affiliations: Popular Republican Movement (1944–1966); Democratic Centre (1966–1976)
- Education: Lycée Corneille
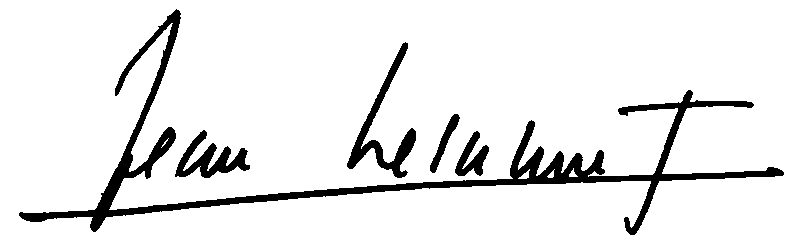
- Signature

Jean Adrien François Lecanuet (French: [ʒɑ̃ ləkanɥɛ]; 4 March 1920 – 22 February 1993) was a French centrist politician.

== Biography ==
Lecanuet was born to a family of modest means in Rouen and gravitated towards philosophy studies. He received his diploma at the age of 22, becoming the youngest agrégé ("A+" professor) in France. He participated in the Second World War French Resistance movement. In August 1944, he was arrested along with a commando that had just blown up the Lille-Brussels railroad, but he managed to escape with the help of a Pole who had been drafted into the German army. He then married Denise Paillard with whom he had three children.

After the Liberation, he became a general inspector at the Ministry of Defence.

Under the Fourth Republic, Lecanuet held ministerial posts numerous times (11 posts in 10 years) and was a member of the Christian-Democratic Popular Republican Movement (MRP). From 1951 to 1955, he was MRP deputy from the Seine-Inférieure region. He became senator from Seine-Maritime in 1959 and was president of the MRP from 1963 to 1965.

In 1965, he ran in the presidential election as a center-right candidate. He was supported by Paul Reynaud. He advocated modernity and European integration and declared to represent a third way between Gaullism on the one hand and the Socialist and Communist Left on the other hand. His "modern-style" campaign and dashing smile had some journalists nickname him "the French Kennedy". Lecanuet obtained 3,777,120 votes (15.6%) in the election's first round, forcing Charles de Gaulle to compete in a second round against François Mitterrand. He replaced the ageing MRP by the Democratic Centre, integrating the liberal-conservative National Centre of Independents and Peasants.

In 1972, Lecanuet founded the Reforming Movement with Jean-Jacques Servan-Schreiber. During the French legislative elections of 1973, Lecanuet negotiated the withdrawal of candidates with Pierre Messmer to ensure the success of the majority. He was elected deputy of Seine-Maritime and actively participated in the 1974 presidential election campaign in support of Valéry Giscard d'Estaing.

Lecanuet was Minister of Justice in Jacques Chirac's first cabinet (1974–1976). From 1976 to 1977, he was Minister of State for Territorial Development in the Raymond Barre's first cabinet. In 1978, he was elected president of the UDF, the party coalition created to support President Valéry Giscard d'Estaing. He held that position until 1988. From 1979 to 1988, he was a Deputy in the European Parliament and, as Senator for Seine-Maritime, the French Senate's chairman of the Foreign Affairs and Armed Forces Commission, a post that he had already held between 1971 and 1973.

In 1986 at the beginning of the first period of "cohabitation" in modern French politics (a President and Prime Minister from opposing parties sharing power) Chirac nominated Lecanuet as Foreign Minister, but President François Mitterrand vetoed the appointment, along with some of Chirac's other nominees.

In 1968, he was elected Mayor of Rouen, a position he held for 23 years until his death.

He died of cancer on 22 February 1993 at the age of 72 in Neuilly-sur-Seine.

== Sources ==
- Chaline (Nadine-Josette), Jean Lecanuet, Beauchesne, Paris, 2000.
- Priol (Philippe), Jean Lecanuet, le vol de l’albatros, Maître Jacques, Caen, 2001.

Political offices
Preceded by Bernard Tissot	Mayor of Rouen; 1968–1993	Succeeded by François Gautier
Preceded by Jean Taittinger	Keeper of the Seals, Minister of Justice; 1974–1976	Succeeded by Olivier Guichard
Vacant Title last held by Olivier Guichard	Minister of State for Territorial Development; 1976–1977	Vacant Title next held by Michel Rocard
Party political offices
New political party	President of the Union for French Democracy; 1978–1988	Succeeded by Valéry Giscard d'Estaing
