= Union of Democrats for the Republic =

Defunct political party in France (1967–1976)

Union of Democrats for the Republic Union des démocrates pour la République
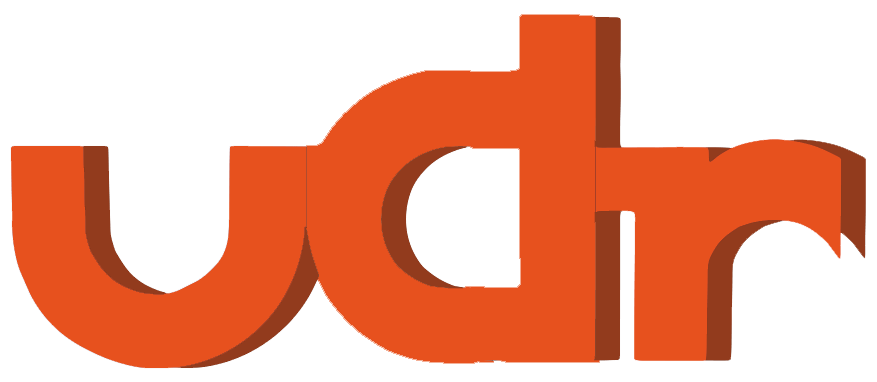
- Founder: Charles de Gaulle
- Founded: 26 November 1967; 58 years ago
- Dissolved: 5 December 1976; 49 years ago
- Preceded by: Union for the New Republic
- Succeeded by: Rally for the Republic
- Headquarters: 123 Rue de Lille, Paris 7th
- Newspaper: La Lettre de la nation
- Ideology: Gaullism; Paternalistic conservatism Conservatism; Pro-Europeanism
- Political position: Centre-right
- European Parliament group: European Democratic Union (1967–73); European Progressive Democrats (1973–76)
- Colors: Orange (official); Blue (customary)

The Union for the Defence of the Republic (French: Union pour la défense de la République [ynjɔ̃ puʁ la defɑ̃s də la ʁepyblik]), after 1968 renamed Union of Democrats for the Republic (French: Union des démocrates pour la République [ynjɔ̃ de demɔkʁat puʁ la ʁepyblik]), commonly abbreviated UDR, was a Gaullist political party in France which existed from 1967 to 1976.

The UDR was the successor to Charles de Gaulle's earlier party, the Rally of the French People, and was organised in 1958, along with the founding of the Fifth Republic as the Union for the New Republic (UNR), and in 1962 merged with the Democratic Union of Labour, a left-wing Gaullist group. In 1967 it was joined by some Christian Democrats to form the Union of Democrats for the Fifth Republic, later dropping the 'Fifth'. After the May 1968 crisis, it formed a right-wing coalition named Union for the Defense of the Republic (UDR); it was subsequently renamed Union of Democrats for the Republic, retaining the abbreviation UDR, in October 1968.

Under de Gaulle's successor Georges Pompidou it promoted the Gaullist movement. It dissolved in 1976, and its successor was the Rally for the Republic (RPR) founded by Jacques Chirac.

== Secretaries-general ==
- 1968–71: Robert Poujade
- 1971–72: René Tomasini
- 1972–73: Alain Peyrefitte
- 1973–74: Alexandre Sanguinetti
- 1974–75: Jacques Chirac
- 1975–76: André Bord
- 1976: Yves Guéna

== Election results ==
=== Presidential ===
President of the French Republic
Election year	Candidate	1st round			2nd round		
Election year	Candidate	Votes	%	Rank	Votes	%	Rank
1969	Georges Pompidou	10,051,783	44.5	1st	11,064,371	58.2	Won
1974	Jacques Chaban-Delmas	3,857,728	15.1	3rd	-	-	Lost

=== National Assembly ===
National Assembly
Election year	Leader	1st round		2nd round		Seats	+/−	Rank (seats)	Government
Election year	Leader	Votes	%	Votes	%	Seats	+/−	Rank (seats)	Government
1967	Georges Pompidou	8,448,082	37.7	7,972,908	42.6	243 / 487	▼25	1st	Presidential majority
1968	Georges Pompidou	9,667,532	43.6	6,762,170	46.4	354 / 487	▲111	1st	Presidential majority
1973	Pierre Messmer	8,242,661	34.6	10,701,135	45.6	272 / 491	▼82	1st	Presidential majority

== See also ==
- Gaullist Party
