= Political history of France =

National political history

The political history of France covers the history of political movements and systems of government in the nation of France, from the earliest stages of the history of France until the present day. This political history might be considered to start with the formation of the Kingdom of France, and continue until the present day.

Political history is the narrative and survey of political events, ideas, movements, organs of government, voters, parties and leaders. It is closely related to other fields of history, including diplomatic history, constitutional history, social history, people's history, and public history. Political history studies the organization and operation of power in large societies.

== Monarchy of France ==
The Kingdom of France is the historiographical name or umbrella term given to various political entities of France in the medieval and early modern period. It was one of the most powerful states in Europe since the High Middle Ages. It was also an early colonial power, with colonies in Asia and Africa, and the largest being New France in North America.

=== Origins ===
France originated as West Francia (Francia Occidentalis), the western half of the Carolingian Empire, with the Treaty of Verdun (843). A branch of the Carolingian dynasty continued to rule until 987, when Hugh Capet was elected king and founded the Capetian dynasty. The territory remained known as Francia and its ruler as rex Francorum ("king of the Franks") well into the High Middle Ages. The first king calling himself rex Francie ("King of France") was Philip II, in 1190, and officially from 1204. From then, France was continuously ruled by the Capetians and their cadet lines under the Valois and Bourbon until the monarchy was abolished in 1792 during the French Revolution. The Kingdom of France was also ruled in personal union with the Kingdom of Navarre over two time periods, 1284–1328 and 1572–1620, after which the institutions of Navarre were abolished and it was fully annexed by France (though the King of France continued to use the title "King of Navarre" through the end of the monarchy).

France in the Middle Ages was a decentralised, feudal monarchy. In Brittany and Catalonia (now a part of Spain), as well as Aquitaine, the authority of the French king was barely felt. Lorraine and Burgundy were states of the Holy Roman Empire and not yet a part of France. West Frankish kings were initially elected by the secular and ecclesiastical magnates, but the regular coronation of the eldest son of the reigning king during his father's lifetime established the principle of male primogeniture, which became codified in the Salic law.

During the Late Middle Ages, rivalry between the Capetian dynasty, rulers of the Kingdom of France and their vassals the House of Plantagenet, who also ruled the Kingdom of England as part of their so-called competing Angevin Empire, resulted in many armed struggles. The most notorious of them all are the series of conflicts known as the Hundred Years' War (1337–1453) in which the kings of England laid claim to the French throne. Emerging victorious from said conflicts, France subsequently sought to extend its influence into Italy, but was defeated by Spain and the Holy Roman Empire in the ensuing Italian Wars (1494–1559).

=== Capetian dynasty ===
The Capetian dynasty, also known as the "House of France", is a dynasty of European origin, and a branch of the Robertians and the Karlings. It is among the largest and oldest royal houses in Europe and the world, and consists of Hugh Capet, the founder of the dynasty, and his male-line descendants, who ruled in France without interruption from 987 to 1792, and again from 1814 to 1848. The senior line ruled in France as the House of Capet from the election of Hugh Capet in 987 until the death of Charles IV in 1328. That line was succeeded by cadet branches, the Houses of Valois and then Bourbon, which ruled without interruption until the French Revolution abolished the monarchy in 1792. The Bourbons were restored in 1814 in the aftermath of Napoleon's defeat, but had to vacate the throne again in 1830 in favour of the last Capetian monarch of France, Louis Philippe I, who belonged to the House of Orléans. Cadet branches of the Capetian House of Bourbon are still reigning over Spain and Luxembourg.

The dynasty had a crucial role in the formation of the French state. Initially obeyed only in their own demesne, the Île-de-France, the Capetian kings slowly but steadily increased their power and influence until it grew to cover the entirety of their realm. For a detailed narration on the growth of French royal power, see Crown lands of France.

Members of the dynasty were traditionally Catholic, and the early Capetians had an alliance with the Church. The French were also the most active participants in the Crusades, culminating in a series of five Crusader kings – Louis VII, Philip Augustus, Louis VIII, Louis IX, and Philip III. The Capetian alliance with the papacy suffered a severe blow after the disaster of the Aragonese Crusade. Philip III's son and successor, Philip IV, humiliated Pope Boniface VIII and brought the papacy under French control. The later Valois, starting with Francis I, ignored religious differences and allied with the Ottoman sultan to counter the growing power of the Holy Roman Empire. Henry IV was a Protestant at the time of his accession, but realized the necessity of conversion after four years of religious warfare.

The Capetians generally enjoyed a harmonious family relationship. By tradition, younger sons and brothers of the king of France were given appanages for them to maintain their rank and to dissuade them from claiming the French crown itself. When Capetian cadets did aspire for kingship, their ambitions were directed not at the French throne, but at foreign thrones. As a result, the Capetians have reigned at different times in the kingdoms of Portugal, Sicily and Naples, Navarre, Hungary and Croatia, Poland, Spain and Sardinia, grand dukedoms of Lithuania and Luxembourg, and in Latin and Brazilian empires.

In modern times, King Felipe VI of Spain is a member of this family, while Grand Duke Henri of Luxembourg is related to the family by agnatic kinship; both through the Bourbon branch of the dynasty. Along with the House of Habsburg, arguably its greatest historic rival, it was one of the two oldest European royal dynasties. It was also one of the most powerful royal family in European history, having played a major role in its politics for much of its existence. According to Oxford University, 75% of all royal families in European history, are related to the Capetian dynasty.

== Ancien Régime ==
The Ancien Régime (Note: According to the Oxford English Dictionary (second edition, 1989) and the New Oxford American Dictionary (third edition, 2010), the original French is translated "old rule". The term no longer needs to be italicised since it has become part of the English language. According to the New Oxford American Dictionary (2010), when it is capitalised, it refers specifically to the political and social system in France before the French Revolution. When it is not capitalised, it can refer to any political or social system that has been displaced.) also known as the Old Regime, was the political and social system of the Kingdom of France from the Late Middle Ages (c. 1500) until 1789 and the French Revolution which abolished the feudal system of the French nobility (1790) and hereditary monarchy (1792). The Valois dynasty ruled during the Ancien Régime up until 1589 and was subsequently replaced by the Bourbon dynasty. The term is occasionally used to refer to the similar feudal systems of the time elsewhere in Europe such as that of Switzerland.

France in the early modern era was increasingly centralised; the French language began to displace other languages from official use, and the monarch expanded his absolute power in the administrative system of the Ancien Régime, complicated by historic and regional irregularities in taxation, legal, judicial, and ecclesiastic divisions, and local prerogatives. Religiously France became divided between the Catholic majority and a Protestant minority, the Huguenots, which led to a series of civil wars, the Wars of Religion (1562–1598). The Wars of Religion crippled France, but triumph over Spain and the Habsburg monarchy in the Thirty Years' War made France the most powerful nation on the continent once more. The kingdom became Europe's dominant cultural, political and military power in the 17th century under Louis XIV. In parallel, France developed its first colonial empire in Asia, Africa, and in the Americas.

The administrative and social structures of the Ancien Régime in France evolved across years of state-building, legislative acts (like the Ordinance of Villers-Cotterêts), and internal conflicts. The Valois dynasty's attempts at reform and at re-establishing control over the scattered political centres of the country were hindered by the Wars of Religion from 1562 to 1598. During the Bourbon dynasty, much of the reigns of Henry IV (r. 1589–1610) and Louis XIII (r. 1610–1643) and the early years of Louis XIV (r. 1643–1715) focused on administrative centralization. Despite the notion of "absolute monarchy" (typified by the king's right to issue orders through lettres de cachet) and efforts to create a centralized state, Ancien Régime France remained a country of systemic irregularities: administrative, legal, judicial, and ecclesiastic divisions and prerogatives frequently overlapped, while the French nobility struggled to maintain their rights in the matters of local government and justice, and powerful internal conflicts (such as The Fronde) protested against this centralization.

=== French Wars of Religion ===
The French Wars of Religion were a series of civil wars between French Catholics and Protestants (called Huguenots) from 1562 to 1598. Between two and four million people died from violence, famine or disease directly caused by the conflict, and it severely damaged the power of the French monarchy. One of its most notorious episodes was the St. Bartholomew's Day massacre in 1572. The fighting ended with a compromise in 1598, when Henry of Navarre, who had converted to Catholicism in 1593, was proclaimed King Henry IV of France and issued the Edict of Nantes, which granted substantial rights and freedoms to the Huguenots. However, Catholics continued to disapprove of Protestants and of Henry, and his assassination in 1610 triggered a fresh round of Huguenot rebellions in the 1620s.

Tensions between the two religions had been building since the 1530s, exacerbating existing regional divisions. The death of Henry II of France in July 1559 initiated a prolonged struggle for power between his widow Catherine de' Medici and powerful nobles. These included a fervently Catholic faction led by the Guise and Montmorency families, and Protestants headed by the House of Condé and Jeanne d'Albret. Both sides received assistance from external powers, with Spain and Savoy supporting the Catholics, and England and the Dutch Republic backing the Protestants.

Moderates, also known as Politiques, hoped to maintain order by centralising power and making concessions to Huguenots, rather than the policies of repression pursued by Henry II and his father Francis I. They were initially supported by Catherine de' Medici, whose January 1562 Edict of Saint-Germain was strongly opposed by the Guise faction and led to an outbreak of widespread fighting in March. The Edict of Amboise' also known as the Edict of Pacification, was signed at the Château of Amboise on 19 March 1563 by Catherine de' Medici, acting as regent for her son Charles IX of France. The Edict ended the first stage of the French Wars of Religion, inaugurating a period of official peace in France by guaranteeing the Huguenots religious privileges and freedoms. However, it was gradually undermined by continuing religious violence at a regional level and hostilities renewed in 1567. Catherine de' Medici later hardened her stance and backed the 1572 St. Bartholomew's Day massacre in Paris, which resulted in Catholic mobs killing between 5,000 and 30,000 Protestants throughout France.

The wars threatened the authority of the monarchy and the last Valois kings, Catherine's three sons Francis II, Charles IX, and Henry III.

Their Bourbon successor Henry IV of France responded by creating a strong central state and extending toleration to Huguenots. Henry IV successfully ended the civil wars. He and his ministers appeased Catholic leaders using bribes of about 7 million écus, a sum greater than France's annual revenue. Huguenot leaders were placated by the Edict of Nantes, which had four separate sections. The articles laid down the tolerance which would be accorded to the Huguenots including the exact places where worship may or may not take place, the recognition of three Protestant universities, and the allowance of Protestant synods. The king also issued two personal documents (called brevets) which recognized the Protestant establishment. The Edict of Nantes signed religious tolerance into law, and the brevets were an act of benevolence that created a Protestant state within France.

Despite this, it would take years to restore law and order to France. The Edict was met by opposition from the parlements, which objected to the guarantees offered to Protestants. The Parlement de Rouen did not formally register the edict until 1609, although it begrudgingly observed its terms.

The latter policy would last until 1685, when Henry's grandson Louis XIV revoked the Edict of Nantes.

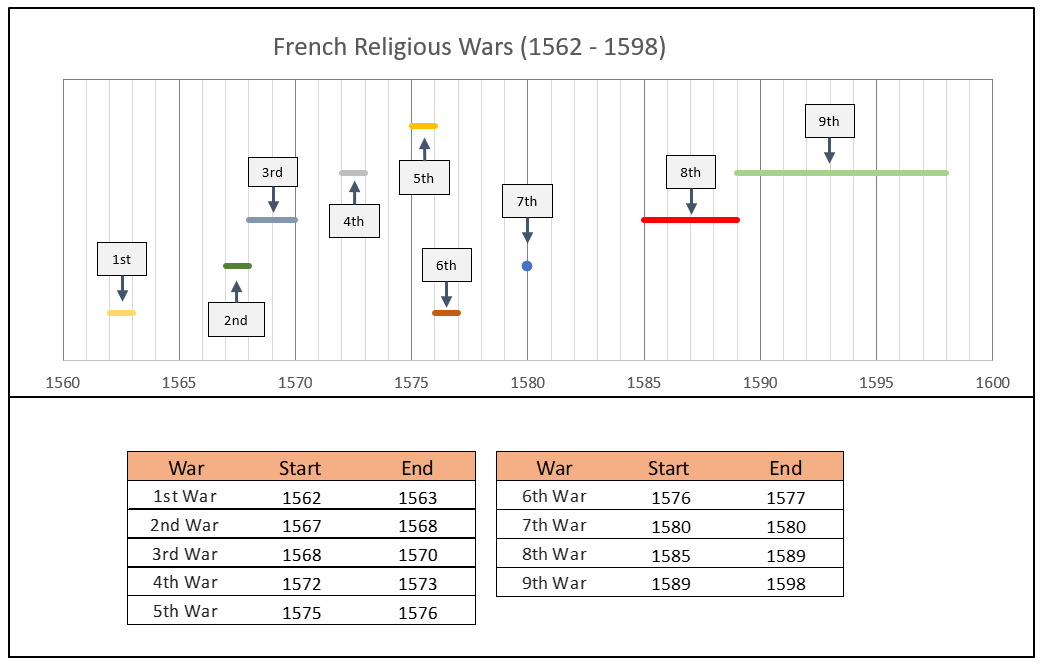
Timeline for the French religious wars

== House of Bourbon ==
The House of Bourbon is a dynasty that originated in the Kingdom of France as a branch of the Capetian dynasty, the royal House of France. Bourbon kings began to rule France and Navarre in 1589. A branch descended from the French Bourbons came to rule Spain in the 18th century and is the current Spanish royal family.

The royal Bourbons originated in 1272, when Robert, the youngest son of King Louis IX of France, married the heiress of the lordship of Bourbon. The house continued for three centuries as a cadet branch, serving as nobles under the direct Capetian and Valois kings. The senior line of the House of Bourbon became extinct in the male line in 1527 with the death of Duke Charles III of Bourbon. This made the junior Bourbon-Vendôme branch the genealogically senior branch of the House of Bourbon.

In 1589, at the death of Henry III of France, the House of Valois became extinct in the male line. Under the Salic law, the head of the House of Bourbon, as the senior representative of the senior-surviving branch of the Capetian dynasty, became King of France as Henry IV. Bourbon monarchs then united to France the part of the Kingdom of Navarre north of the Pyrenees, which Henry's father had acquired by marriage in 1555, ruling both until the 1792 overthrow of the monarchy during the French Revolution.

Restored briefly in 1814 and definitively in 1815 after the fall of the First French Empire, the senior line of the Bourbons was finally overthrown in the July Revolution of 1830. A cadet Bourbon branch, the House of Orléans, then ruled for 18 years (1830–1848), until it too was overthrown

=== Civil War and the reign of Henry IV ===
The first Bourbon king of France was Henry IV. He was born on 13 December 1553 in the Kingdom of Navarre. Antoine de Bourbon, his father, was a ninth-generation descendant of King Louis IX of France. Jeanne d'Albret, his mother, was the Queen of Navarre and niece of King Francis I of France. He was baptized Catholic, but raised Calvinist. After his father was killed in 1562, he became Duke of Vendôme at the age of 10, with Admiral Gaspard de Coligny (1519–1572) as his regent. Seven years later, the young duke became the nominal leader of the Huguenots after the death of his uncle the Prince de Condé in 1569.

In 1572, Catherine de' Medici, mother of King Charles IX of France, arranged for the marriage of her daughter, Margaret of Valois, to Henry, ostensibly to advance peace between Catholics and Huguenots. Many Huguenots gathered in Paris for the wedding on 24 August, but were ambushed and slaughtered by Catholics in the St. Bartholomew's Day Massacre. Henry saved his own life by converting to Catholicism. He repudiated his conversion in 1576 and resumed his leadership of the Huguenots. The period from 1576 to 1584 was relatively calm in France, with the Huguenots consolidating control of much of the south with only occasional interference from the royal government.

A major civil war erupted in 1584, when François, Duke of Anjou, younger brother of King Henry III of France, died, leaving Navarre next in line for the throne. Thus began the War of the Three Henrys, as Henry of Navarre, Henry III, and the ultra-Catholic leader, Henry of Guise, fought a confusing three-cornered struggle for dominance. After Henry III was assassinated on 31 July 1589, Navarre claimed the throne as the first Bourbon king of France, Henry IV.

Much of Catholic France, organized into the Catholic League, refused to recognize a Protestant monarch and instead recognized Henry IV's uncle, Charles, Cardinal de Bourbon, as rightful king, and the civil war continued. Henry won a crucial victory at Ivry on 14 March 1590 and, following the death of the Cardinal the same year, the forces of the League lacked an obvious Catholic candidate for the throne and divided into various factions. Nevertheless, as a Protestant, Henry IV was unable to take Paris, a Catholic stronghold, or to decisively defeat his enemies, now supported by the Spanish. He reconverted to Catholicism in 1593 and was crowned king retroactively to 1589 at the Cathedral of Chartres on 27 February 1594.

=== Huguenot rebellions ===
The Huguenot rebellions, sometimes called the Rohan Wars'after the Huguenot leader Henri de Rohan, were a series of rebellions of the 1620s in which French Calvinist Protestants (Huguenots), mainly located in southwestern France, revolted against royal authority. The uprising occurred a decade after the death of Henry IV who, himself originally a Huguenot before converting to Catholicism, had protected Protestants through the Edict of Nantes. His successor Louis XIII, under the regency of his Italian Catholic mother Marie de' Medici, became more intolerant of Protestantism. The Huguenots responded by establishing independent political and military structures, establishing diplomatic contacts with foreign powers, and openly revolting against central power. The Huguenot rebellions came after two decades of internal peace under Henry IV, following the intermittent French Wars of Religion of 1562–1598.

=== Louis XIV ===
Louis XIV (Louis-Dieudonné; 5 September 1638 – 1 September 1715), also known as Louis the Great (Louis le Grand) or the Sun King (le Roi Soleil), was King of France from 1643 until his death in 1715. His verified reign of 72 years and 110 days is the longest of any sovereign. (Note: Some monarchs of states that were not fully sovereign for most or all of their reign ruled for longer. For example, Sobhuza II of Swaziland at 82 years and Lord Bernard VII of Lippe in the Holy Roman Empire at 81 years.) Although Louis XIV's France was emblematic of the Age of Absolutism in Europe, the King surrounded himself with a variety of significant political, military, and cultural figures, such as Bossuet, Colbert, Louvois, Le Brun, Le Nôtre, Lully, Mazarin, Molière, Racine, Turenne, Condé, and Vauban.

Louis began his personal rule of France in 1661, after the death of his chief minister Cardinal Mazarin, when the King famously declared that he would take over the job himself. An adherent of the divine right of kings, Louis continued his predecessors' work of creating a centralised state governed from the capital. He sought to eliminate the remnants of feudalism persisting in parts of France; by compelling many members of the nobility to reside at his lavish Palace of Versailles, he succeeded in pacifying the aristocracy, many of whom had participated in the Fronde rebellions during his minority. He thus became one of the most powerful French monarchs and consolidated a system of absolute monarchy in France that endured until the French Revolution. Louis also enforced uniformity of religion under the Catholic Church. His revocation of the Edict of Nantes abolished the rights of the Huguenot Protestant minority and subjected them to a wave of dragonnades, effectively forcing Huguenots to emigrate or convert, virtually destroying the French Protestant community.

During Louis's long reign, France emerged as the leading European power and regularly asserted its military strength. A conflict with Spain marked his entire childhood, while during his personal rule, Louis fought three major continental conflicts, each against powerful foreign alliances: the Franco-Dutch War, the Nine Years' War, and the War of the Spanish Succession. In addition, France also contested shorter wars, such as the War of Devolution and the War of the Reunions. Warfare defined Louis's foreign policy and his personal ambition shaped his approach. Impelled by "a mix of commerce, revenge, and pique", he sensed that war was the ideal way to enhance his glory. His wars strained France's resources to the utmost, while in peacetime, he concentrated on preparing for the next war. He taught his diplomats that their job was to create tactical and strategic advantages for the French military. Upon his death in 1715, Louis XIV left his great-grandson and successor, Louis XV, a powerful kingdom, albeit in major debt after the War of the Spanish Succession that had raged on since 1701.

Significant achievements during Louis XIV's reign which would go on to have a wide influence on the early modern period, well into the Industrial Revolution and until today, include the construction of the Canal du Midi, the patronage of artists, and the founding of the French Academy of Sciences.

==== Civil wars 1648–1653 ====
The Fronde was a series of civil wars in the Kingdom of France between 1648 and 1653, occurring in the midst of the Franco-Spanish War, which had begun in 1635. King Louis XIV confronted the combined opposition of the princes, the nobility, the law courts (parlements), as well as most of the French people, and managed to subdue them all. The dispute started when the government of France issued seven fiscal edicts, six of which were to increase taxation. The parlements resisted and questioned the constitutionality of the King's actions and sought to check his powers.

The Fronde was divided into two campaigns, the Parlementary Fronde and the Fronde of the Princes. The timing of the outbreak of the Parlementary Fronde, directly after the Peace of Westphalia (1648) that ended the Thirty Years' War, was significant. The nuclei of the armed bands that terrorized parts of France under aristocratic leaders during that period had been hardened in a generation of war in Germany, where troops still tended to operate autonomously. Louis XIV, impressed as a young ruler with the experience of the Fronde, came to reorganize French fighting forces under a stricter hierarchy, whose leaders ultimately could be made or unmade by the King. Cardinal Mazarin blundered into the crisis but came out well ahead at the end.

The Fronde represented the final attempt of the French nobility to do battle with the king, and they were humiliated. In the long term, the Fronde served to strengthen royal authority, but weakened the economy. The Fronde facilitated the emergence of absolute monarchy.

The Spanish Empire, which had promoted the Fronde to the point that without its support, it would have had a more limited character, benefited from the internal upheaval in France since it contributed to the Spanish military's renewed success in its war against the French between 1647 and 1656, so much so that the year 1652 could be considered a Spanish annus mirabilis. Only the later English intervention in the form of the Anglo-Spanish War (1654–1660) in favor of France would change the situation.

=== 16th to 18th centuries ===
In the 16th to the 17th centuries, the First French colonial empire stretched from a total area at its peak in 1680 to over 10,000,000 square kilometres (3,900,000 mi^{2}), the second-largest empire in the world at the time behind the Spanish Empire. Colonial conflicts with Great Britain led to the loss of much of its North American holdings by 1763.

==== Seven Years' War ====
The Seven Years' War (1756–1763) was a global conflict that involved most of the European great powers, and was fought primarily in Europe, the Americas, and Asia-Pacific. Other concurrent conflicts include the French and Indian War (1754–1763), the Carnatic Wars (1744–1763), and the Anglo-Spanish War (1762–1763). The opposing alliances were led by Great Britain and France respectively, both seeking to establish global pre-eminence at the expense of the other. Along with Spain, France fought Britain both in Europe and overseas with land-based armies and naval forces, while Britain's ally Prussia sought territorial expansion in Europe and consolidation of its power. Long-standing colonial rivalries pitted Britain against France and Spain in North America and the West Indies. They fought on a grand scale with consequential results. Prussia sought greater influence in the German states, while Austria wanted to regain Silesia, captured by Prussia in the previous war, and to contain Prussian influence.

In a realignment of traditional alliances, known as the Diplomatic Revolution of 1756, Prussia became part of a coalition led by Britain, which also included long-time Prussian competitor Hanover, at the time in personal union with Britain. At the same time, Austria ended centuries of conflict between the Bourbon and Habsburg families by allying with France, along with Saxony, Sweden, and Russia. Spain aligned formally with France in 1761, joining France in the Third Family Compact between the two Bourbon monarchies. Smaller German states either joined the Seven Years' War or supplied mercenaries to the parties involved in the conflict.

Anglo-French conflicts broke out in their North American colonies in 1754, when British and French colonial militias and their respective Native American allies engaged in small skirmishes, and later full-scale colonial warfare. The colonial conflicts would become a theatre of the Seven Years' War when war was officially declared two years later, and it effectively ended France's presence as a land power on that continent. It was "the most important event to occur in eighteenth-century North America" prior to the American Revolution. Spain entered the war on the French side in 1762, unsuccessfully attempting to invade Britain's ally Portugal in what became known as the Fantastic War.

The alliance with France was a disaster for Spain, with the loss to Britain of two major ports, Havana in Cuba and Manila in the Philippines, returned in the 1763 Treaty of Paris between France, Spain and Great Britain. In Europe, the large-scale conflict that drew in most of the European powers was centred on the desire of Austria (long the political centre of the Holy Roman Empire of the German nation) to recover Silesia from Prussia. The Treaty of Hubertusburg ended the war between Saxony, Austria and Prussia, in 1763.

Britain began its rise as the world's predominant colonial and naval power. France's supremacy in Europe was halted until after the French Revolution and the emergence of Napoleon Bonaparte. Prussia confirmed its status as a great power, challenging Austria for dominance within the German states, thus altering the European balance of power.

=== Later developments ===
French intervention in the American Revolutionary War helped the United States secure independence from King George III and the Kingdom of Great Britain, but was costly and achieved little for France.

Following the French Revolution, which began in 1789, the Kingdom of France adopted a written constitution in 1791, but the Kingdom was abolished a year later and replaced with the French First Republic. The monarchy was restored by the other great powers in 1814 and, with the exception of the Hundred Days in 1815, lasted until the French Revolution of 1848.

== French Revolution ==
=== Background ===
The underlying causes of the French Revolution were the Ancien Régime's inability to manage rising social and economic inequality. Population growth and interest payments on government debt led to economic depression, unemployment, and high food prices. Combined with a regressive tax system and resistance to reform by the ruling elite, the result was a crisis Louis XVI proved unable to resolve.

Between 1700 and 1789, the French population grew from an estimated 21 to 28 million, while Paris alone had over 600,000 inhabitants, of whom roughly one third had no regular work. Food production failed to keep up with these numbers, and although wages increased by 22% between 1770 and 1790, in the same period prices rose by 65%, which many blamed on government inaction. Combined with a series of poor harvests, by 1789 the result was a rural peasantry with nothing to sell, and an urban proletariat whose purchasing power had collapsed.

High levels of state debt, which acted as a drag on the wider economy, are often attributed to the 1778–1783 Anglo-French War. However, one economic historian argues "neither [its] level in 1788, or previous history, can be considered an explanation for the outbreak of revolution in 1789". In 1788, the ratio of debt to gross national income in France was 55.6%, compared to 181.8% in Britain, and although French borrowing costs were higher, the percentage of revenue devoted to interest payments was roughly the same in both countries.

The problem lay in the assessment and collection of the taxes used to fund government expenditure. Rates varied widely from one region to another, were often different from the official amounts, and collected inconsistently. Complexity, as much as the financial burden, caused resentment among all taxpayers; although the nobility paid significantly less than other classes, they complained just as much. (Note: Contrary to what is often assumed, the nobility were subject to tax, although how much they were able to evade or pass onto their tenants is disputed.) Attempts to simplify the system were blocked by the regional Parlements which controlled financial policy. The resulting impasse in the face of widespread economic distress led to the calling of the Estates-General, which became radicalised by the struggle for control of public finances.

Although willing to consider reforms, Louis XVI often backed down when faced with opposition from conservative elements within the nobility. The court became the target for popular anger, particularly Queen Marie-Antoinette, who was viewed as a spendthrift Austrian spy, and blamed for the dismissal of 'progressive' ministers like Jacques Necker. For their opponents, Enlightenment ideas on equality and democracy provided

=== Societal conditions ===
The French Revolution was a period of radical political and societal change in France that began with the Estates General of 1789 and ended with the formation of the French Consulate in November 1799. Many of its ideas are considered fundamental principles of liberal democracy, while the values and institutions it created remain central to French political discourse.

Its causes are generally agreed to be a combination of social, political and economic factors, which the Ancien Régime proved unable to manage. In May 1789, widespread social distress led to the convocation of the Estates General, which was converted into a National Assembly in June. Continuing unrest culminated in the Storming of the Bastille on 14 July, which led to a series of radical measures by the Assembly, including the abolition of feudalism, the imposition of state control over the Catholic Church in France, and extension of the right to vote.

The next three years were dominated by the struggle for political control, exacerbated by economic depression and civil disorder. Austria, Britain, Prussia and other external powers sought to restore the Ancien Régime by force, while many French politicians saw war as the best way to unite the nation and preserve the revolution by exporting it to other countries. These factors resulted in the outbreak of the French Revolutionary Wars in April 1792, abolition of the French monarchy and proclamation of the French First Republic in September 1792, followed by the execution of Louis XVI in January 1793.

Following the Paris-based Insurrection of 31 May – 2 June 1793 the constitution was suspended and effective political power passed from the National Convention to the more radical Committee of Public Safety. An estimated 16,000 "counter-revolutionaries" were executed during the subsequent Reign of Terror, which ended with the so-called Thermidorian Reaction in July 1794. Weakened by a combination of external threats and internal opposition, in November 1795 the Republic was replaced by the Directory. Four years later in November 1799, the Consulate seized power in a military coup led by Napoleon Bonaparte. This is generally seen as marking the end of the Revolutionary period.

=== National Convention ===
The National Convention (French: Convention nationale) was the constituent assembly of the Kingdom of France for one day and the French First Republic for its first three years during the French Revolution, following the two-year National Constituent Assembly and the one-year Legislative Assembly. Created after the great insurrection of 10 August 1792, it was the first French government organized as a republic, abandoning the monarchy altogether. The Convention sat as a single-chamber assembly from 20 September 1792 to 26 October 1795 (4 Brumaire IV under the Convention's adopted calendar).

The Convention came about when the Legislative Assembly decreed the provisional suspension of King Louis XVI and the convocation of a National Convention to draw up a new constitution with no monarchy. The other major innovation was to decree that deputies to that Convention should be elected by all Frenchmen twenty-one years old or more, domiciled for a year and living by the product of their labor. The National Convention was, therefore, the first French assembly elected by a suffrage without distinctions of class.

Although the Convention lasted until 1795, power was effectively delegated by the convention and concentrated in the small Committee of Public Safety from April 1793. The eight months from the fall of 1793 to the spring of 1794, when Maximilien Robespierre and his allies dominated the Committee of Public Safety, represent the most radical and bloodiest phase of the French Revolution, known as the Reign of Terror. After the fall of Robespierre, the Convention lasted for another year until a new constitution was written, ushering in the French Directory.

=== The Directory ===
The Directory (also called Directorate) was the governing five-member committee in the French First Republic from 26 October 1795 (4 Brumaire an IV) until 10 November 1799, when it was overthrown by Napoleon Bonaparte in the Coup of 18 Brumaire and replaced by the Consulate. Directoire is the name of the final four years of the French Revolution. Mainstream historiography also uses the term in reference to the period from the dissolution of the National Convention on 26 October 1795 to Napoleon's coup d’état.

The Directory was continually at war with foreign coalitions, including Britain, Austria, Prussia, the Kingdom of Naples, Russia and the Ottoman Empire. It annexed Belgium and the left bank of the Rhine, while Bonaparte conquered a large part of Italy. The Directory established 29 short-lived sister republics in Italy, Switzerland and the Netherlands. The conquered cities and states were required to send France huge amounts of money, as well as art treasures, which were used to fill the new Louvre museum in Paris. An army led by Bonaparte tried to conquer Egypt and marched as far as Saint-Jean-d'Acre in Syria. The Directory defeated a resurgence of the War in the Vendée, the royalist-led civil war in the Vendée region, but failed in its venture to support the Irish Rebellion of 1798 and create an Irish Republic.

The French economy was in continual crisis during the Directory. At the beginning, the treasury was empty; the paper money, the Assignat, had fallen to a fraction of its value, and prices soared. The Directory stopped printing assignats and restored the value of the money, but this caused a new crisis; prices and wages fell, and economic activity slowed to a standstill.

In its first two years, the Directory concentrated on ending the excesses of the Jacobin Reign of Terror; mass executions stopped, and measures taken against exiled priests and royalists were relaxed. The Jacobin political club was closed on 12 November 1794 and the government crushed an armed uprising planned by the Jacobins and an early socialist revolutionary, François-Noël Babeuf, known as "Gracchus Babeuf". But after the discovery of a royalist conspiracy including a prominent general, Jean-Charles Pichegru, the Jacobins took charge of the new Councils and hardened the measures against the Church and émigrés. They took two additional seats in the Directory, hopelessly dividing it.

In 1799, after several defeats, French victories in the Netherlands and Switzerland restored the French military position, but the Directory had lost all the political factions' support, including some of its Directors. Bonaparte returned from Egypt in October, and was engaged by Abbé Sieyès and others to carry out a parliamentary coup d'état on 9–10 November 1799. The coup abolished the Directory and replaced it with the French Consulate led by Bonaparte.

==== War with European powers ====
The French Revolutionary Wars were a series of sweeping military conflicts lasting from 1792 until 1802 and resulting from the French Revolution. They pitted France against Britain, Austria, Prussia, Russia, and several other monarchies. They are divided in two periods: the War of the First Coalition (1792–1797) and the War of the Second Coalition (1798–1802). Initially confined to Europe, the fighting gradually assumed a global dimension. After a decade of constant warfare and aggressive diplomacy, France had conquered territories in the Italian Peninsula, the Low Countries and the Rhineland. French success in these conflicts ensured the spread of revolutionary principles over much of Europe.

Initially, the rulers of Europe viewed the French Revolution as a dispute between the French king and his subjects, and not something in which they should interfere. As revolutionary rhetoric grew more strident, they declared the interest of the monarchs of Europe as one with the interests of Louis XVI and his family; this Declaration of Pillnitz (27 August 1791) threatened ambiguous, but quite serious, consequences if anything should happen to the royal family. The position of the revolutionaries became increasingly difficult. Compounding their problems in international relations, French émigrés continued to agitate for support of a counter-revolution. Finally, on 20 April 1792, the French National Convention declared war on Austria. In this War of the First Coalition (1792–98), France ranged itself against most of the European states sharing land or water borders with her, plus Portugal and the Ottoman Empire.

Despite some victories in 1792, by early 1793, France was in terrible crisis: French forces had been pushed out of Belgium; also there was revolt in the Vendée over conscription; widespread resentment of the Civil Constitution of the Clergy; and the French king had just been executed. The armies of the French Republic were in a state of disruption; the problems became even more acute following the introduction of mass conscription, the levée en masse, which saturated an already distressed army with thousands of illiterate, untrained men.

The Committee of Public Safety was formed (6 April 1793) and the levée en masse drafted all potential soldiers aged 18 to 25 (August 1793). The new French armies had better results. In several campaigns during 1794, the French won the battles of Kortrijk, Tourcoing and Fleurus in June. The French armies drove the Austrians, British, and Dutch beyond the Rhine, occupying Belgium, the Rhineland, and the south of the Netherlands. .

In the 1795 military campaigns, although the Rhine Campaign of 1795 proved to be disastrous, the French achieved success in other theaters of war such as the War of the Pyrenees (1793–95). The French established the Batavian Republic as a sister republic (May 1795) and gained Prussian recognition of French control of the Left Bank of the Rhine by the first Peace of Basel. With the Treaty of Campo Formio, Austria ceded the Austrian Netherlands to France and Northern Italy was turned into several French sister republics. Spain made a separate peace accord with France, the Second Treaty of Basel, and the French Directory annexed more of the Holy Roman Empire.

In the 1796 military campaigns, Napoleon Bonaparte, at the time serving as a commander in the French Army, was successful in a daring invasion of Italy. In the Montenotte Campaign, he separated the armies of Sardinia and Austria, defeating each one in turn, and then forced a peace on Sardinia. Following this, his army captured Milan and started the Siege of Mantua. Bonaparte defeated successive Austrian armies sent against him under Johann Peter Beaulieu, Dagobert Sigmund von Wurmser and József Alvinczi while continuing the siege.

In the 1797 military campaigns, Bonaparte carried all before him against Sardinia and Austria in northern Italy (1796–1797) near the Po Valley, culminating in the Peace of Leoben and the Treaty of Campo Formio (October 1797). The First Coalition collapsed, leaving only Britain in the field fighting against France.

=== The Consulate ===
The consulate was the top-level Government of France from the fall of the Directory in the coup of 18 Brumaire on 10 November 1799 until the start of the Napoleonic Empire on 18 May 1804. By extension, the term The Consulate also refers to this period of French history.

During this period, Napoleon Bonaparte, as First Consul (Premier consul), established himself as the head of a more authoritarian, autocratic, and centralized republican government in France while not declaring himself sole ruler. Due to the long-lasting institutions established during these years, historian Robert B. Holtman has called the Consulate "one of the most important periods of all French history." By the end of this period, Napoleon had engineered authoritarian personal rule which has been viewed as military dictatorship.

== Nineteenth Century ==
=== Reign of Napoleon ===
The Arc de Triomphe, ordered by Napoleon in honour of the Grande Armée, is one of several landmarks whose construction was started in Paris during the First French Empire.

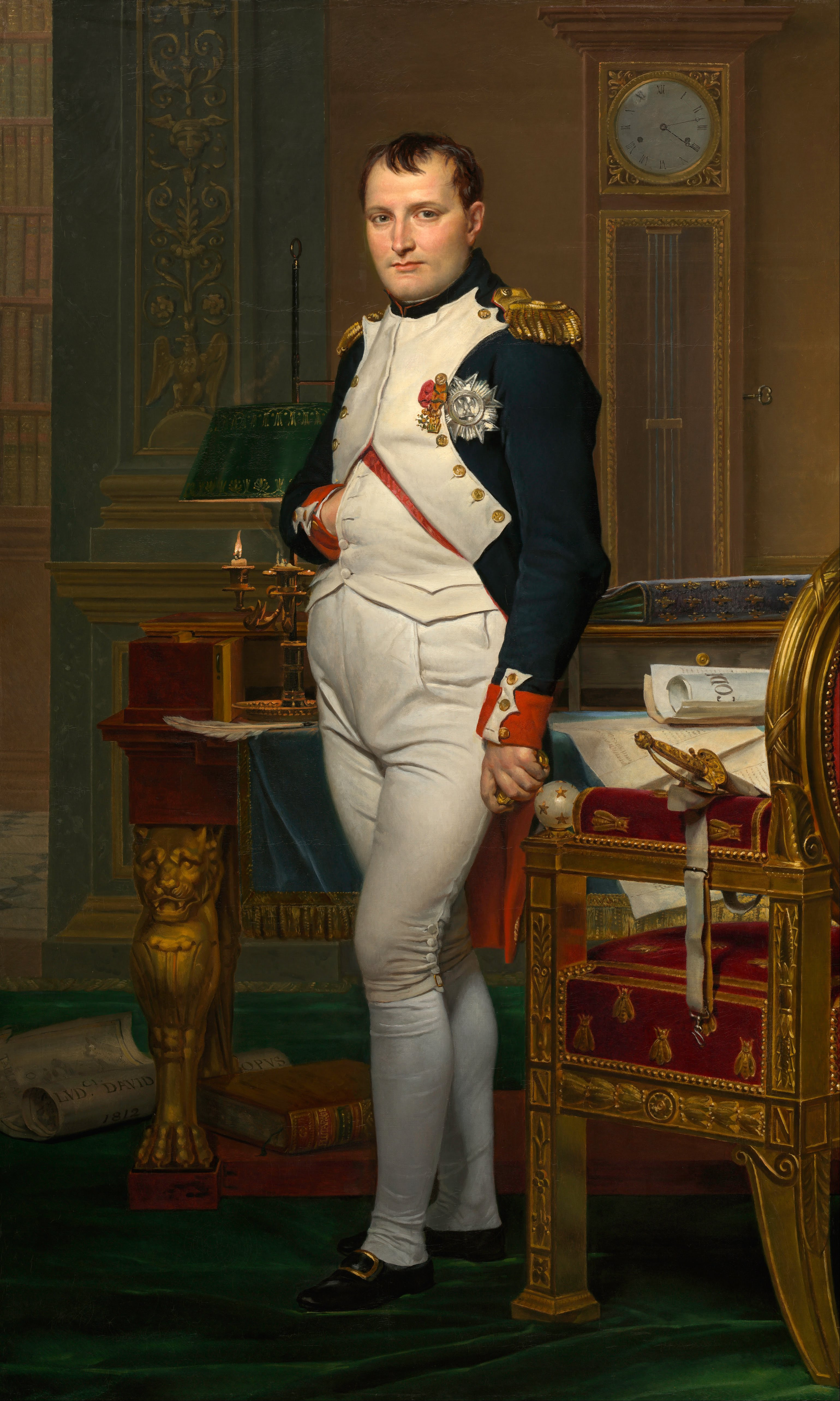
Portrait of Napoleon in his late thirties, in high-ranking white and dark blue military dress uniform.

The First French Empire, officially the French Republic, (Note: Domestically styled as French Republic until 1808: compare the French franc minted in 1808 and 1809, as well as Article 1 of the Constitution of the Year XII.) then the French Empire after 1809 and also known as Napoleonic France, was the empire ruled by Napoleon Bonaparte, who established French hegemony over much of continental Europe at the beginning of the 19th century. It lasted from 18 May 1804 to 3 May 1814 and again briefly from 20 March 1815 to 7 July 1815.

Although France had already established a colonial empire overseas since the early 17th century, the French state had remained a kingdom under the Bourbons and a republic after the French Revolution. Historians refer to Napoleon's regime as the First Empire to distinguish it from the restorationist Second Empire (1852–1870) ruled by his nephew Napoleon III. The First French Empire is considered by some to be a "Republican empire."

On 18 May 1804, Napoleon was granted the title Emperor of the French (Empereur des Français) by the French Sénat conservateur and was crowned on 2 December 1804, signifying the end of the French Consulate and of the French First Republic. Despite his coronation, the state continued to be formally called the "French Republic" until October 1808. The Empire achieved military supremacy in mainland Europe through notable victories in the War of the Third Coalition against Austria, Prussia, Russia, Britain and allied states, notably at the Battle of Austerlitz in 1805. French dominance was reaffirmed during the War of the Fourth Coalition, at the Battle of Jena–Auerstedt in 1806 and the Battle of Friedland in 1807, before Napoleon's final defeat at the Battle of Waterloo in 1815.

A series of wars, known collectively as the Napoleonic Wars, extended French influence to much of Western Europe and into Poland. At its height in 1812, the French Empire had 130 departments, ruled over 44 million subjects, maintained an extensive military presence in Germany, Italy, Spain, and Poland, and counted Austria and Prussia as nominal allies. Early French victories exported many ideological features of the Revolution throughout Europe: the introduction of the Napoleonic Code throughout the continent increased legal equality, established jury systems and legalized divorce, and seigneurial dues and seigneurial justice were abolished, as were aristocratic privileges in all places except Poland.

France's defeat in 1814 (and then again in 1815), marked the end of the First French Empire and the beginning of the Bourbon Restoration.

==== Napoleonic Wars ====
The Napoleonic Wars (1803–1815) were a series of conflicts fought between the First French Empire under Napoleon (1804–1815), and a fluctuating array of European coalitions. The wars originated in political forces arising from the French Revolution (1789–1799) and from the French Revolutionary Wars (1792–1802) (the War of the First Coalition (1792–1797) and the War of the Second Coalition (1798–1802)), and produced a period of French domination over Continental Europe. There were seven Napoleonic Wars, five named after the coalitions that fought Napoleon, plus two named for their respective theatres: (i) the War of the Third Coalition (1803–1806), (ii) the War of the Fourth Coalition (1806–1807), (iii) the War of the Fifth Coalition (1809), (iv) the War of the Sixth Coalition (1813–1814), (v) the War of the Seventh Coalition (1815), (vi) the Peninsular War (1807–1814), and (vii) the French invasion of Russia (1812).

Upon realising the Coup of 18 Brumaire, whereby he became the First Consul of France in 1799, Napoleon assumed control of the politically chaotic French First Republic. He then organised a financially stable French state with a strong bureaucracy and a professional army. War broke out soon after, with Britain declaring war on France on 18 May 1803, ending the Peace of Amiens, and forming a coalition made up of itself, Sweden, Russia, Naples, and Sicily. Frank McLynn argues that Britain went to war in 1803 out of a "mixture of economic motives and national neuroses—an irrational anxiety about Napoleon's motives and intentions." The British fleet under Admiral Nelson decisively crushed the joint Franco-Spanish navy in the Battle of Trafalgar in October 1805. This victory secured British control of the seas and prevented a planned invasion of Britain. In December 1805, Napoleon defeated the allied Russo-Austrian army at Austerlitz, effectively ending the Third Coalition and forcing Austria to make peace. Concerned about increasing French power, Prussia led the creation of the Fourth Coalition with Russia, Saxony, and Sweden, which resumed war in October 1806. Napoleon soon defeated the Prussians at Jena-Auerstedt and the Russians at Friedland, bringing an uneasy peace to the continent. The treaty failed to end the tension, and war broke out again in 1809, with the badly prepared Fifth Coalition, led by Austria. At first, the Austrians won a significant victory at Aspern-Essling, but were quickly defeated at Wagram.

Hoping to isolate and weaken Britain economically through his Continental System, Napoleon launched an invasion of Portugal, the only remaining British ally in continental Europe. After occupying Lisbon in November 1807, and with the bulk of French troops present in Spain, Napoleon seized the opportunity to turn against his former ally, depose the reigning Spanish royal family and declare his brother King of Spain in 1808 as José I. The Spanish and Portuguese revolted with British support and expelled the French from Iberia in 1814 after six years of fighting.

Concurrently, Russia, unwilling to bear the economic consequences of reduced trade, routinely violated the Continental System, prompting Napoleon to launch a massive invasion of Russia in 1812. The resulting campaign ended in disaster for France and the near-destruction of Napoleon's Grande Armée.

Encouraged by the defeat, Austria, Prussia, Sweden, and Russia formed the Sixth Coalition and began a new campaign against France, decisively defeating Napoleon at Leipzig in October 1813 after several inconclusive engagements. The Allies then invaded France from the east, while the Peninsular War spilled over into southwestern France. Coalition troops captured Paris at the end of March 1814 and forced Napoleon to abdicate in April. He was exiled to the island of Elba, and the Bourbons were restored to power. However, Napoleon escaped in February 1815, and reassumed control of France for around One Hundred Days. The allies formed the Seventh Coalition, defeated him at Waterloo in June 1815, and exiled him to the island of Saint Helena, where he died six years later.

The wars had profound consequences on global history, including the spread of nationalism and liberalism, advancements in civil law, the rise of Britain as the world's foremost naval and economic power, the appearance of independence movements in Spanish America and subsequent decline of the Spanish and Portuguese Empires, the fundamental reorganization of German and Italian territories into larger states, and the introduction of radically new methods of conducting warfare. After the end of the Napoleonic Wars, the Congress of Vienna redrew Europe's borders and brought a relative peace to the continent, lasting until the Crimean War in 1853.

=== Bourbon Restoration ===
The Bourbon Restoration was the period of French history during which the House of Bourbon returned to power after the first fall of Napoleon on 3 May 1814. Briefly interrupted by the Hundred Days in 1815, the Restoration continued until the July Revolution of 26 July 1830. The monarchy was again restored after the July Revolution, and continued until 1848.

Louis XVIII and Charles X, brothers of the executed King Louis XVI, successively mounted the throne and instituted a conservative government intended to restore the proprieties, if not all the institutions, of the Ancien Régime. Exiled supporters of the monarchy returned to France but were unable to reverse most of the changes made by the French Revolution. Exhausted by decades of war, the nation experienced a period of internal and external peace, stable economic prosperity and the preliminaries of industrialization.

=== July Monarchy ===
After the July Revolution of 1830, royal power was once again secured and the July Monarchy was established. The July Monarchy governed under principles of moderate conservatism, and improved relations with the UK. The July Revolution was a second French Revolution. It led to the overthrow of King Charles X, the French Bourbon monarch, and the ascent of his cousin Louis Philippe, Duke of Orléans. After 18 precarious years on the throne, Louis-Philippe was overthrown in the French Revolution of 1848.

The 1830 Revolution marked a shift from one constitutional monarchy, under the restored House of Bourbon, to another, the July Monarchy; the transition of power from the House of Bourbon to its cadet branch, the House of Orléans; and the replacement of the principle of hereditary right by that of popular sovereignty. Supporters of the Bourbons would be called Legitimists, and supporters of Louis Philippe were known as Orléanists. In addition, there continued to be Bonapartists supporting the return of Napoleon's descendants.

The July Monarchy, officially the Kingdom of France, was a liberal constitutional monarchy in France under Louis Philippe I, starting on 26 July 1830, with the July Revolution of 1830, and ending 23 February 1848, with the Revolution of 1848. It marks the end of the Bourbon Restoration (1814–1830). It began with the overthrow of the conservative government of Charles X, the last king of the main line House of Bourbon.

Louis Philippe, a member of the more liberal Orléans branch of the House of Bourbon, proclaimed himself as Roi des Français ("King of the French") rather than "King of France", emphasizing the popular origins of his reign. The king promised to follow the juste milieu, or the middle-of-the-road, avoiding the extremes of both the conservative supporters of Charles X and radicals on the left.

The July Monarchy was dominated by wealthy bourgeoisie and numerous former Napoleonic officials. It followed conservative policies, especially under the influence (1840–48) of François Guizot. The king promoted friendship with the United Kingdom and sponsored colonial expansion, notably the French conquest of Algeria. By 1848, a year in which many European states had a revolution, the king's popularity had collapsed, and he abdicated.

=== French Second Republic ===
The French Second Republic, officially the French Republic, was the second republican government of France. It existed from 1848 until its dissolution in 1852.

In 1848, Europe erupted into a mass revolutionary wave in which many citizens challenged their royal leaders. Caught up in the revolutionary wave, France underwent the February Revolution that overthrew the July Monarchy of King Louis-Phillipe, Radical and liberal factions of the population convened the French Second Republic in 1848. Attempting to restore the First French Republic's values on human rights and constitutional government, they adopted the motto of the First Republic; Liberté, Égalité, Fraternité. The republic was plagued with tribalist tendencies of its leading factions: royalists, proto-socialists, liberals, and conservatives. In this environment, the nephew of Napoleon, Louis-Napoléon Bonaparte, established himself as a popular anti-establishment figure. He was elected as president in 1848. Under the Second Republic's constitution, the president was restricted to a single term.

Louis-Napoléon overthrew the republic in an 1851 coup d'état, proclaimed himself Emperor Napoleon III, and created the Second French Empire.

=== Coup of 1851 ===
The coup d'état of 2 December 1851 was a self-coup staged by Louis-Napoléon Bonaparte (later Napoleon III), at the time President of France under the Second Republic. Code-named Operation Rubicon and timed to coincide with the anniversary of Napoleon I's coronation and victory at Austerlitz, the coup dissolved the National Assembly, granted dictatorial powers to the president and preceded the establishment of the Second French Empire a year later, which lasted until 1870.

Faced with the prospect of having to leave office in 1852, Louis-Napoléon Bonaparte (nephew of Napoleon Bonaparte) staged the coup in order to stay in power and implement his reform programs; these included the restoration of universal male suffrage previously abolished by the legislature. The continuation of his authority and the power to produce a new constitution were approved days later by a constitutional referendum, resulting in the Constitution of 1852, which greatly increased the powers and the term length of the president. A year after the coup, Bonaparte proclaimed himself "Emperor of the French" under the regnal name Napoleon III.

The Second French Empire, officially the "French Empire," was an Imperial Bonapartist regime of Napoleon III from 14 January 1852 to 27 October 1870, between the Second and the Third Republic of France. The Second French Empire oversaw some of the most significant achievements in infrastructure and economy, and reasserted itself as the dominant power in Europe for a decade.

Historians in the 1930s and 1940s often disparaged the Second Empire as a precursor of fascism, but by the late 20th century it emerged as an example of a modernising regime.

Historians have generally given the Second Empire negative evaluations on its foreign policy, and somewhat more positive evaluations of domestic policies, especially after Napoleon III liberalised his rule after 1858. He promoted French business and exports. The greatest achievements included a grand railway network that facilitated commerce and tied the nation together with Paris as its hub. This stimulated economic growth and brought prosperity to most regions of the country. The Second Empire is given high credit for the rebuilding of Paris with broad boulevards, striking public buildings and elegant residential districts for higher class Parisians.

In international policy, Napoleon III tried to emulate his uncle Napoleon I, engaging in numerous imperial ventures around the world as well as several wars in Europe. He began his reign with French victories in Crimea and in Italy, gaining Savoy and Nice.

Using very harsh methods, he built up the French Empire in French North Africa and in French Indochina in Southeast Asia. Napoleon III also launched an intervention in Mexico seeking to erect a Second Mexican Empire and bring it into the French orbit, but this ended in a fiasco.

He badly mishandled the threat from Prussia, and by the end of his reign, the French emperor found himself without allies in the face of overwhelming German force. His rule was ended during the Franco-Prussian War, when he was captured by the Prussian Army at Sedan in 1870, and dethroned by French republicans. He died in exile in 1873 in England.

== Third Republic (1870 – 1940) ==
The French Third Republic was the system of government adopted in France from 4 September 1870, when the Second French Empire collapsed during the Franco-Prussian War, until 10 July 1940, after the Fall of France during World War II led to the formation of the Vichy government.

The early days of the Third Republic were dominated by political disruptions caused by the Franco-Prussian War of 1870–1871, which the Republic continued to wage after the fall of Emperor Napoleon III in 1870. Harsh reparations exacted by the Prussians after the war resulted in the loss of the French regions of Alsace (keeping the Territoire de Belfort) and Lorraine (the northeastern part, i.e. present-day department of Moselle), social upheaval, and the establishment of the Paris Commune. The early governments of the Third Republic considered re-establishing the monarchy, but disagreement as to the nature of that monarchy and the rightful occupant of the throne could not be resolved. Consequently, the Third Republic, originally envisioned as a provisional government, instead became the permanent form of government of France.

The French Constitutional Laws of 1875 defined the composition of the Third Republic. It consisted of a Chamber of Deputies and a Senate to form the legislative branch of government and a president to serve as head of state. Calls for the re-establishment of the monarchy dominated the tenures of the first two presidents, Adolphe Thiers and Patrice de MacMahon, but growing support for the republican form of government among the French populace and a series of republican presidents in the 1880s gradually quashed prospects of a monarchical restoration.

The Third Republic established many French colonial possessions, including French Indochina, French Madagascar, French Polynesia, and large territories in West Africa during the Scramble for Africa, all of them acquired during the last two decades of the 19th century. The early years of the 20th century were dominated by the Democratic Republican Alliance, which was originally conceived as a centre-left political alliance, but over time became the main centre-right party.

The period from the start of World War I to the late 1930s featured sharply polarized politics, between the Democratic Republican Alliance and the Radicals. The government fell less than a year after the outbreak of World War II, when Nazi forces occupied much of France, and was replaced by the rival governments of Charles de Gaulle's Free France (La France libre) and Philippe Pétain's French State (L'État français).

During the 19th and 20th centuries, the French colonial empire was the second largest colonial empire in the world only behind the British Empire; it extended over 13,500,000 km^{2} (5,200,000 sq mi) of land at its height in the 1920s and 1930s. In terms of population however, on the eve of World War II, France and its colonial possessions totaled only 150 million inhabitants, compared with 330 million for British India alone.

Adolphe Thiers called republicanism in the 1870s "the form of government that divides France least"; however, politics under the Third Republic were sharply polarized. On the left stood reformist France, heir to the French Revolution. On the right stood conservative France, rooted in the peasantry, the Roman Catholic Church, and the army. In spite of France's sharply divided electorate and persistent attempts to overthrow it, the Third Republic endured for seventy years, which as of 2023 makes it the longest lasting system of government in France since the collapse of the Ancien Régime in 1789.

== Fourth Republic ==
The French Fourth Republic was the republican government of France from 27 October 1946 to 4 October 1958, governed by the fourth republican constitution of 13 October 1946. It was in many ways a revival of the Third Republic, which governed from 1870 during the Franco-Prussian War to 1940 during World War II, and it suffered many of the same problems.

Despite political dysfunction, the Fourth Republic saw an era of great economic growth in France and the rebuilding of the nation's social institutions and industry after World War II, with assistance from the United States through the Marshall Plan. It also saw the beginning of the rapprochement with France's longtime enemy Germany, which led to Franco-German co-operation and eventually to the European Union.

The new constitution made some attempts to strengthen the executive branch of government to prevent the unstable situation before the war, but instability remained and the Fourth Republic saw frequent changes of government – there were 21 administrations in its 12-year history. Moreover, the government proved unable to make effective decisions regarding decolonization of the numerous remaining French colonies. After a series of crises culminating in the Algerian crisis of 1958, the Fourth Republic collapsed. Wartime leader Charles de Gaulle returned from retirement to preside over a transitional administration empowered to design a new French constitution. The Fourth Republic was dissolved on 5 October 1958 following a public referendum which established the current Fifth Republic with a strengthened presidency.

== Coup of May 1958 ==
=== Political background ===
The May 1958 crisis, also known as the "Algiers putsch" or "the coup of 13 May", was a political crisis in France during the turmoil of the Algerian War of Independence (1954–1962) which led to the collapse of the Fourth Republic and its replacement by the Fifth Republic led by Charles de Gaulle who returned to power after a twelve-year absence. It started as a political uprising in Algiers on 13 May 1958 and then became a military coup d'état led by a coalition headed by Algiers deputy and reserve airborne officer Pierre Lagaillarde, French Generals Raoul Salan, Edmond Jouhaud, Jean Gracieux, and Jacques Massu, and by Admiral Philippe Auboyneau, commander of the Mediterranean fleet. The coup was supported by former Algerian Governor General Jacques Soustelle and his activist allies.

The coup had as its aim to oppose the formation of Pierre Pflimlin's new government and to impose a change of policies in favor of the right-wing partisans of French Algeria.

=== Initial events ===
After his tour as Governor General, Jacques Soustelle had returned to France to organize support for de Gaulle's return to power, while retaining close ties to the army and the settlers. By early 1958, he had organized a coup d'état, bringing together dissident army officers and colonial officials with sympathetic Gaullists. On 13 May, right-wing elements seized power in Algiers and called for a Government of Public Safety under General de Gaulle. Massu became chairman of the Public Safety Committee and one of the leaders of the revolt. General Salan assumed leadership of a Committee of Public Safety formed to replace the civil authority and pressed the junta's demands that de Gaulle be named by French president René Coty to head a government of national union invested with extraordinary powers to prevent the "abandonment of Algeria".

Salan announced on radio that the Army had "provisionally taken over responsibility for the destiny of French Algeria". Under the pressure of Massu, Salan declared Vive de Gaulle! from the balcony of the Algiers Government-General building on 15 May. De Gaulle answered two days later that he was ready to "assume the powers of the Republic". Many worried as they saw this answer as support for the army. At a 19 May press conference, de Gaulle asserted again that he was at the disposal of the country. When a journalist expressed the concerns of some who feared that he would violate civil liberties, de Gaulle retorted vehemently:

Have I ever done that? Quite the opposite, I have reestablished them when they had disappeared. Who honestly believes that, at age 67, I would start a career as a dictator?

On 24 May, French paratroopers from Algeria landed on Corsica by aircraft, taking the French island in a bloodless action called "Opération Corse." Subsequently, preparations were made in Algeria for "Operation Resurrection," which had as objectives the seizure of Paris and the removal of the French government, through the use of paratroopers and armoured forces based at Rambouillet. "Operation Resurrection" was to be implemented if one of three scenarios occurred: if de Gaulle was not approved as leader of France by Parliament, if de Gaulle asked for military assistance to take power, or if it seemed that the French Communist Party was making any move to take power in France.

Political leaders on many sides agreed to support the General's return to power with the notable exceptions of François Mitterrand, who was a minister in Guy Mollet's Socialist government, Pierre Mendès-France (a member of the Radical-Socialist Party, former Prime Minister), Alain Savary (also a member of the French Section of the Workers' International (SFIO)), and the Communist Party. The philosopher Jean-Paul Sartre, a noted atheist, said, "I would rather vote for God", as he would at least be more modest than de Gaulle. Mendès-France and Savary, opposed to their respective parties' support of de Gaulle, would form together, in 1960, the Parti socialiste autonome (PSA, Socialist Autonomous Party), ancestor of the Parti socialiste unifié (PSU, Unified Socialist Party).

=== De Gaulle's return to power (29 May 1958) ===
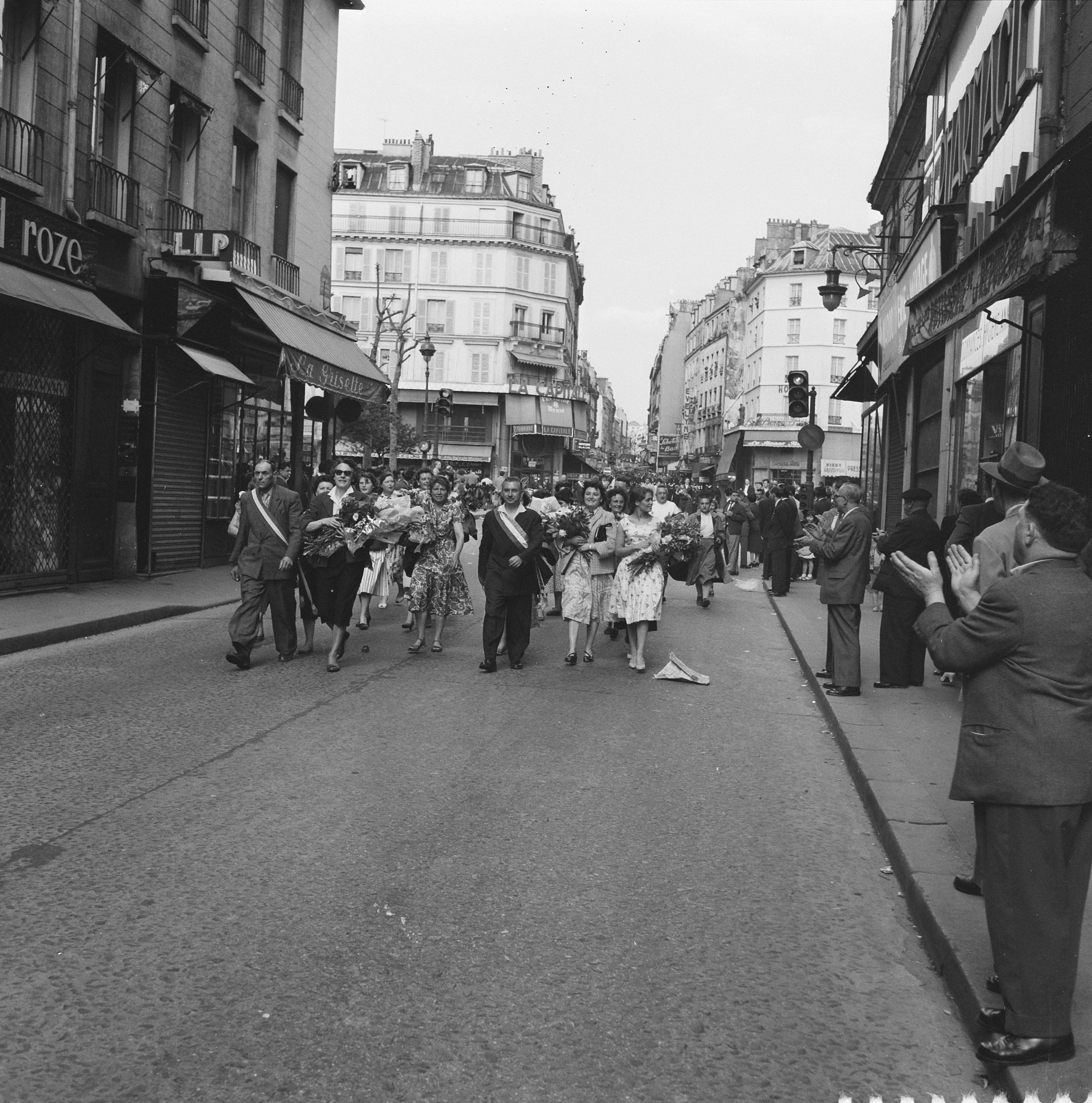
Demonstration on rue du Faubourg-du-Temple in Paris on 1 June

On 29 May President René Coty told parliament that the nation was on the brink of civil war, so he was "turning towards the most illustrious of Frenchmen, towards the man who, in the darkest years of our history, was our chief for the reconquest of freedom and who refused dictatorship in order to re-establish the Republic. I ask General de Gaulle to confer with the head of state and to examine with him what, in the framework of Republican legality, is necessary for the immediate formation of a government of national safety and what can be done, in a fairly short time, for a deep reform of our institutions."

De Gaulle accepted Coty's proposal under the precondition that a new constitution would be introduced creating a powerful presidency in which a sole executive, the first of which was to be himself, ruled for seven-year periods. Another condition was that he be granted extraordinary powers for a period of six months.

De Gaulle's newly formed cabinet was approved by the National Assembly on 1 June 1958, by 329 votes against 224, while he was granted the power to govern by ordinances for a six-month period as well as the task to draft a new Constitution.

The May 1958 crisis indicated that the Fourth Republic by 1958 no longer had any support from the French army in Algeria, and was at its mercy even in civilian political matters. This decisive shift in the balance of power in civil-military relations in France in 1958 and the threat of force was the main immediate factor in the return of de Gaulle to power in France.

== The Fifth Republic ==
=== Origins and History (1958–1981) ===
During the Fifth Republic, founded in 1958 amid the troubles brought by the Algerian War (1954–62), France was ruled by successive right-wing administrations until 1981. The successive governments generally applied the Gaullist program of national independence, and modernization in a dirigiste fashion.

The political instability characteristic of the Fourth Republic was gone. The far-right extremists who had threatened military coups over the question of French Algeria largely receded after Algeria was granted independence. The French Communist Party's image gradually became less radical. Politics largely turned into a Gaullists vs left-wing opposition.

The Gaullist government, however, was criticized for its heavy-handedness: while elections were free, the state had a monopoly on radio and TV broadcasting and sought to have its point of view on events imposed (this monopoly was not absolute, however, since there were radio stations transmitting from nearby countries specifically for the benefit of the French).

Although Gaullism, which had gained legitimacy during World War II, initially also attracted several left-wing individuals, Gaullism in government became decidedly conservative.

In 1962, de Gaulle had the French citizens vote in a referendum concerning the election of the president at universal suffrage, something which had been discredited since Napoleon III's 1851 coup. 3/5 of the voters approved however the referendum, and thereafter the President of the French Republic was elected at universal suffrage, giving him increased authority on the Parliament. De Gaulle won the 1965 presidential election, opposed on his left by François Mitterrand who had taken the lead of the Federation of the Democratic and Socialist Left, a coalition of most left-wing parties (apart from the French Communist Party, then led by Waldeck Rochet who did call to vote for Mitterrand).

=== May 1968 failed revolution, and De Gaulle resignation ===
In May 1968, a series of worker strikes and student riots rocked France. These did not, however, result in an immediate change of government, with a right-wing administration being triumphantly reelected in the snap election of June 1968. However, in 1969 the French electorate turned down a referendum on the reform of the French Senate proposed by de Gaulle. Since the latter had always declared that in the eventuality of a "NO" to a referendum he would resign, the referendum was also a plebiscite. Thus, the rejection of the reform by more than 52% of the voters was widely considered to be mostly motivated by weariness with de Gaulle, and ultimately provoked his resignation that year.

May '68 and its aftermaths saw the occupation of the LIP factory in Besançon, one of the major social conflict of the 1970s, during which the CFDT and the Unified Socialist Party, of which Pierre Mendès-France was a member, theorized workers' self-management. A part of the PSU, the autonomist movement, inspired by Italian operaismo, made its first appearance on the political scene.

Georges Pompidou, de Gaulle's Prime Minister, was elected in 1969, remaining President until his death in 1974. In 1972, 3/5 of the French approved by referendum the enlargement of the European Economic Community (CEE) to the United Kingdom, Denmark, Ireland, and Norway.

After Pompidou's sudden death, Valéry Giscard d'Estaing managed to overhaul the remaining Gaullist barons – with the help of Jacques Chirac —, and won the subsequent election against François Mitterrand on the left. Giscard transformed the ORTF, the state organism in charge of media, and created several different channels, including Radio France. However, it was not until François Mitterrand's accession to the Élysée Palace in 1981 that media were liberalized.

=== Mitterrand Presidency (1981–1995) ===
In 1981, François Mitterrand, a Socialist, was elected president, on a program of far-reaching reforms (110 Propositions for France). This was enabled by the 1972 Common Program between the PS, the PRG and the PCF – which had remained, just as in Italy, a strong party throughout the Cold War. Mitterrand served until 1995.

After securing a majority in parliament through a snap election, his government ran a program of social and economic reforms:

- social policies:
  - abolition of the death penalty;
  - removal of legislation criminalizing certain homosexual behaviors: lowering of the age of consent for homosexual sex to that for heterosexual sex (since the French Revolution, France had never criminalized homosexuality between adults in private)
  - liberalization of media
  - creation of a solidarity tax on wealth (ISF) and reform of the inheritance tax
- economic policies:
  - the government embarked on a wave of nationalizations;
  - the duration of the legal workweek was set to 39 hours, instead of the previous 40 hours.
  - increase of the SMIC minimum wages
- institutional reforms:
  - repealing of exceptional judicial procedures (courts-martial in peace-time, etc.)

However, in 1983, high inflation and economic woes forced a dramatic turnaround with respect to economic policies, known as rigueur (rigor) – the Socialist-Communist government then embarked on policies of fiscal and spending restraint. Though the nationalizations were subsequently reversed by both subsequent left-wing and right-wing governments, the social reforms undertaken have remained standing.

Furthermore, the end of the Trente Glorieuses (Thirty Glorious) period of growth witnesses the beginning of a structural unemployment, which became an important political issue. Since the 1980s, unemployment has remained permanently high, at about 10% of the population, regardless of the policies applied to fight it.

In 1986, Jacques Chirac's neo-Gaullist Rally for the Republic (RPR) party won the legislative election.

==== Larger patterns and trends ====
For the first time in the Fifth Republic, a left-wing President was forced to work together with a right-wing Prime minister, leading to the first cohabitation. Although many commentators were surprised at the time, and considered it to be an institutional crisis, some claiming the Fifth Republic could not accommodate itself of such rivalry at the head of the state, cohabitation repeated itself after the 1993 elections, when the RPR again won the elections, and then after the 1997 elections, when the Socialist Party won, leading to the constitution of Lionel Jospin's Plural Left government while Chirac was only at the beginning of his first presidential term.

The tradition in periods of "cohabitation" (a President of one party, prime minister of another) is for the President to exercise the primary role in foreign and security policy, with the dominant role in domestic policy falling to the prime minister and his government. Jospin stated, however, that he would not a priori leave any domain exclusively to the President, as that was a tradition issued from de Gaulle.

Since then, the government alternated between a left-wing coalition (composed of the French Socialist Party (PS), the French Communist Party (PCF) and more recently Les Verts, the Greens) and a right-wing coalition (composed of Jacques Chirac's Rally for the Republic (RPR), later replaced by the Union for a Popular Movement (UMP), and the Union for French Democracy, UDF). Those two coalitions are fairly stable; there have been none of the mid-term coalition reorganizations and governments frequently overthrown which were commonplace under the Fourth Republic.

The 1980s and 1990s saw also the rise of Jean-Marie Le Pen's National Front (FN), a far-right party which blames immigration, more particularly immigration from North African countries such as Algeria, for increased unemployment and crime. The social situation in the French suburbs (banlieues: literally, "suburbs", but in France a euphemism for large suburban housing projects for the poor, with a high proportion of the population of North African descent) still have to be successfully tackled. Jean-Marie Le Pen's relative success at the French Presidential election, 2002 has been attributed in part to concerns about juvenile criminality.

Massive general strikes followed by all the trade-unions were triggered in November–December 1995, paralyzing France, in protest against the Juppé plan of libéral (in French, free market) reforms. These strikes were generally considered a turning point in the French social movement. It remains to be seen how much of these reforms will now be enacted by Sarkozy's first government, as Sarkozy was elected president on a similar platform in May 2007.

=== Chirac coalition with the Left (1995–2002) ===
During his first two years in office, President Jacques Chirac's prime minister was Alain Juppé, who served contemporaneously as leader of Chirac's neo-Gaullist Rally for the Republic (RPR). Chirac and Juppé benefited from a very large, if rather unruly, majority in the National Assembly (470 out of 577 seats).

Mindful that the government might have to take politically costly decisions in advance of the legislative elections planned for spring 1998 in order to ensure that France met the Maastricht criteria for the single currency of the EU, Chirac decided in April 1997 to call early elections.

The Left, led by Socialist Party leader Lionel Jospin, whom Chirac had defeated in the 1995 presidential race, unexpectedly won a solid National Assembly majority (319 seats, with 289 required for an absolute majority). President Chirac named Jospin prime minister on 2 June, and Jospin went on to form a Plural Left government composed primarily of Socialist ministers, along with some ministers from allied parties of the left, such as the Communist Party and the Greens.

Jospin stated his support for continued European integration and his intention to keep France on the path towards Economic and Monetary Union, albeit with greater attention to social concerns.

Chirac and Jospin worked together, for the most part, in the foreign affairs field with representatives of the presidency and the government pursuing a single, agreed French policy. Their "cohabitation" arrangement was the longest-lasting in the history of the Fifth Republic.

=== The right in power 2002–2012 ===
However, it ended subsequent to the legislative elections that followed Chirac's decisive defeat of Jospin (who failed even to make it through to the runoff) in the 2002 presidential election.

This led to President Chirac's appointment of Jean-Pierre Raffarin (UMP) as the new prime minister.

On 29 May 2005, French voters in the referendum on the Treaty establishing a Constitution for Europe turned down the proposed charter by a wide margin.

This was generally regarded as a rebuke to Chirac and his government as well as the PS leadership, the majority save for the leftist faction and Laurent Fabius – had supported the proposed constitution. Two days later, Raffarin resigned and Chirac appointed Dominique de Villepin, formerly Foreign Minister as Prime Minister of France.

An enduring force is Jean-Marie Le Pen's National Front party, whose anti-immigration, isolationist policies have been described by critics as inspired by xenophobia. Le Pen's survival into the runoff of 2002 had many observers worried this time, but in the 2007 first round Le Pen finished a distant fourth.

The 23 February 2005 French law on colonialism was met by a public uproar on the left-wing. Voted by the UMP majority, it was charged with advocating historical revisionism, and after long debates and international opposition (from Abdelaziz Bouteflika or Aimé Césaire, founder of the Négritude movement), was repealed by Jacques Chirac himself.

In Autumn 2005, civil unrest erupted in a number of lower classes suburbs due to the violence of the police. As a result, the government invoked a state of emergency which lasted until January 2006.

In 2006, Prime Minister Dominique de Villepin enacted amendments that established a First Employment Contract, known as the CPE, a special kind of employment contract under which workers under the age of 26 could be hired and fired liberally.

Proponents of the measure argued that French workforce laws, which put the burden of proof on the employer for dismissing employees, dissuaded employers from hiring new employees; according to them, this is one reason while the unemployment rate of those under 26 is 23% and that of youngsters from some lower classes neighbourhoods as high as 40%, and not the refusal of exploitation to enrich the wealthy class.

However, the plan backfired, with criticism both on the way the law was passed (using an exceptional legislative procedure) and on the law itself, which was criticized both for weakening workers' rights in general, and for singling out the young disfavourably instead of attempting to cure more general issues. Following the 2006 protests against the CPE, the government had to withdraw the legislation.

Following from these events, Villepin lost all hopes of winning the presidency, and his government no longer tried to enact reforms.

Conservative Nicolas Sarkozy was elected and took office on 16 May 2007. The problem of high unemployment has yet to be resolved. Sarkozy was very actively involved in the military operation in Libya to oust the Gaddafi government in 2011.

=== Socialists in power (2012-2017) ===
In 2012 election for president, Socialist François Hollande defeated Sarkozy's try for reelection. Hollande advocated a growth policy in contrast to the austerity policy advocated by Germany's Angela Merkel as a way of dealing with the Euro area crisis. In 2014, Hollande stood with Merkel and US President Obama in imposing sanctions on Russia for its actions against Ukraine. In December 2016, Hollande announced he will not seek re-election as president of France.

=== Macron's presidency (2017- present) ===
In the 2017 election for president the winner was Emmanuel Macron, the founder of a new party "La République En Marche!". It declared itself above left and right. He called parliamentary elections that brought him the absolute majority of députés. He appointed a prime minister from the centre right, and ministers from both the centre left and centre right.

In the 2022 presidential election president Macron was re-elected after beating his far-right rival, Marine Le Pen, in the runoff. He was the first re-elected incumbent French president since 2002.

In May 2022, President Emmanuel Macron's centrist party, La République en Marche, changed its name to Renaissance. However, Macron's coalition lost its parliamentary majority in June 2022 election, meaning the first time in 20 years that French president lost absolute majority in parliament. Macron's centre-right alliance won 234 seats, the leftist coalition 141 seats, the far-right National Rally 90 seats, and the conservative Les Républicains and its allies 75 seats. The opposition left-wing coalition has been dominated by La France Insoumise (LFI) and its leader Jean-Luc Mélenchon. The other members of the left-wing alliance are the Socialist Party (PS), French Communist Party (PCF), and the Greens Europe Ecologie les Verts (EELV).

== Issues ==
=== The issue of liberalism or socialism ===
One of the great questions of current French politics is that of libéralisme – that is, economic liberalism, individualism society and the market system, as opposed to government intervention in the economy. Broadly speaking, supporters of libéralisme want to let the forces of the free market operate with less regulation. For example, they want little regulation of the workforce and repeal of French laws setting a 35-hour work week rather than leaving this to contract negotiations. Critics of libéralisme argue that governmental intervention is necessary for the welfare of workers; they point out that great gains in workers' rights were historically achieved by government intervention and social mobilization, as during the Popular Front. Similarly, proponents of libéralisme favour free markets and the free movement of goods, which critics contend benefit the wealthy class at the expense of the ordinary worker.

According to historian René Rémond's famous classification of the right-wings in France, this libérale tradition belongs to the Orleanist inheritance, while Gaullists inherited from Bonapartism and a tradition of state intervention issued from the National Council of Resistance (CNR)'s welfare state program after the war. However, neo-Gaullists have since rallied economic liberalism, with the result that modern French conservatives – such as the UMP, or before that the RPR, the UDF or the Independent Republicans – all supported economic liberalism. The so-called right-wing of the Socialist Party: François Hollande, Dominique Strauss-Kahn, Ségolène Royal have done likewise.

Some rightists, such as Nicolas Sarkozy, favour radical change in the relationship between the government and the free-market. They argue that for the last 30 years, under both left-wing and right-wing governments, the French have been misled into believing that things could go on without real reforms. One may say that they favour a Thatcherite approach. Others on the right (including Dominique de Villepin) as well as some on the left argue in favour of gradual reforms. In comparison, the 2005 refusal of the French electorate to vote for the proposed European Constitution was interpreted by some – in particular the French Communist Party and far-left parties such as LO or the LCR – as a popular refusal of libéralisme, which the European Union is perceived to embody. Some such as Laurent Fabius have argued that the Socialist Party should thus have a more "left-wing" line.

Libertarianism as such is rare in France; it is considered a form of ultra-liberalism or neo-liberalism and upheld only by very few right-wingers, such as Alain Madelin.

== Major societal groups ==
=== Unions and leaders ===
Workers' unions.

- Confédération Générale du Travail (CGT): around 800,000 claimed members. It had traditional ties with the French Communist Party, but is currently tending more towards social-democratic views. 34.00%. General secretary : Philippe Martinez
- Confédération Française Démocratique du Travail (CFDT): about 800,000 members. Considered to be close to the more reformist factions of the PS, and the first to sign with "patronat". 21.81%. General secretary : Laurent Berger
- Force Ouvrière (FO): 500,000 members. Anarcho-syndicalism to yellow syndicalism, depend of the union, split from the CGT (1947). 15.81%. General secretary: Jean-Claude Mailly
- Confédération Française des Travailleurs Chrétiens (CFTC): 140,000 members. Christian reformist. 8.69%. President: Jacques Voisin
- Confédération Générale des Cadres (CFE-CGC): Reformist, White-collar and executive workers union which claims 180,000 members. 8.19%. President : Philippe Louis
- Union Nationale des Syndicats Autonomes (UNSA): 360,000 members. Reformist. 6.25%. general secretary: Alain Olive
- Solidaires Unitaires Démocratiques, (SUD): heir of the "Group of 10", a group of radical trade unions ("syndicalisme de lutte"), 110,000 members, 3.82%
- Confédération Nationale du Travail (CNT): Anarcho-syndicalist trade union which claims 8,000 members

=== Employers' organisations ===
- Movements of French Corporations (Mouvement des Entreprises de France (MEDEF), formerly known as CNPF), sometimes referred to as patronat.
- General confederation of the little and middle corporations ("Confédération Générale des Petites et Moyennes Entreprises") (CGPME), aligned its position to the MEDEF.

== Major parties and groupings ==
=== Left and Right in France and the main political parties ===
Since the 1789 French Revolution, the political spectrum in France has obeyed the left–right distinction. However, due to the historical association of the term droite (right) with monarchism, conservative or right-wing parties have tended to avoid officially describing themselves as representing the "right wing".

French politics was for a long time characterised by two politically opposed groupings: one left-wing, centred on the French Socialist Party, and the other right-wing, centred previously around the Rassemblement pour la République (RPR) and its successor the Union for a Popular Movement (UMP), today called Les Republicains.

Liberal and centrist political party, Renaissance (RE) (formerly known as En Marche! and later La République En Marche!), has been the biggest political party in France since 2017.

=== The Left ===
At the beginning of the 20th century, the French Left divided itself into:

- The Anarchists, who were more active in trade unions (they controlled the CGT from 1906 to 1909).
- Revolutionaries: the SFIO founded by Jean Jaurès, Jules Guesde etc.
- Reformists: the Republican, Radical and Radical-Socialist Party and non-SFIO socialists.

==== After World War I ====
- Unlike those in Spain, the Anarchists lost popularity and significance due to the nationalism brought about by World War I and lost the CGT majority. They joined the CGT-U and later created the CGT-SR.
- The SFIO split in the 1920 Tours Congress, where a majority of SFIO members created the French Section of the Communist International (the future PCF).
- The SFIC, which quickly turned into a pro-Stalinist and isolated party (with no alliances), lost many of its original members, and changed only in 1934 (after a fascist attack to the Parliament on 6 February 1934) when it combined with the Popular Front.
- The minority of the SFIO who refused to join the Comintern retained the name and, led by Léon Blum, gradually regained ground from the Communists.
- The Radical Party, which inherited of the tradition of the French Left and of Radical Republicanism (sharing left-wing traits such as anti-clericalism), progressively moved more and more to the mainstream center, being one of the main governing parties between the two World Wars.

The Left was in power during:

- The Radicals and the SFIO, who do not participate in the government), from 1924 to 1926.
- From 1932 to the 6 February 1934 crisis (Radicals and independent socialists).
- Under the Popular Front (Radicals, SFIO, PCF) in 1936 to 1938 under Socialist Léon Blum and then Radical Camille Chautemps.

==== After World War II ====
===== The Old Left =====
- The anarchist movements.
- The PCF remained an important force (around 28% in elections) despite it being in perpetual opposition after May 1947. From 1956 to the end of the 1970s it was interested in the ideas of "eurocommunism".
- The SFIO declined from 23.5% in 1946 to 15% in 1956 and increased only in 1967 (19.0%). It was in government from 1946 to 1951 and 1956–1958. It was transformed in 1971 (congrès d'Épinay) in the Parti Socialiste by reunion of various socialists "clubs", the SFIO,...

After 1959, both parties were in opposition until 1981. They had formed a coalition (with the Party Radical de Gauche) called the "Union de la Gauche" between 1972 and 1978.

===== The New Left (or Second Left) =====
The Old Left was contested on its left by the New Left parties including the:

- Cornelius Castoriadis's Socialisme ou Barbarie from 1948 to 1965
- Advocates of new social movements (including Michel Foucault, Gilles Deleuze, Pierre Bourdieu)
- Arlette Laguiller's Workers' Struggle
- The Revolutionary Communist League
- Others components of the New Left included the environmentalists (who would eventually found The Greens in 1982)

However, the emblem of the New Left was the Unified Socialist Party, or PSU.

===== The Moderate Centre-Left =====
- The Radical Party, despite some ambiguities (support to Pierre Mendès-France's center-left Republican Front during the 1956 legislative elections), finally embraced economic liberalism and slid to the center-right. But in 1972, left-wing Radicals split to form the Left Radical Party.

==== After the end of the Cold War ====
- In 1993, Jean-Pierre Chevènement left the PS to form the Citizen and Republican Movement (MRC), a left-wing eurosceptic party attached to the tradition of republicanism and universalism (secularism, equal opportunities, opposition to multiculturalism).
- In 1994, communist and socialist dissidents created the Convention for a Progressive Alternative, a party with an eco-socialist platform, and they have 1 deputy, 8 mayors, and some councillors. They remain present in the Haute-Vienne and Val-de-Marne.
- In the 1990s and 2000s, some parties continued the inheritance of the PSU like Les Alternatifs, or ANPAG.
- The New Anticapitalist Party is founded in an attempt to unify the fractured movements of the French radical Left, and attract new activists drawing on the relative combined strength of far-left parties in presidential elections in 2002, where they achieved 10.44% of the vote, and 2007 (7.07%)?

=== The Right ===
The right-wing has been divided into three broad families by historian René Rémond.

==== Legitimists ====
Counter-revolutionaries who opposed all change since the French Revolution. Today, they are located on the far-right of the French political spectrum.

These included:

- The ultra-royalists during the Bourbon Restoration
- The Action française monarchist movement
- The supporters of the Vichy regime's Révolution nationale
- The activists of the OAS during the Algerian War (1954–1962)
- Most components of Jean-Marie Le Pen's National Front
- Philippe de Villiers' conservative Movement for France

==== Orleanists ====
Orleanists had rallied the Republic at the end of the 19th century and advocated economic liberalism (referred to in French simply as libéralisme). Today, they are broadly classified as centre-right or centrist parties.

These included:

- The right-wing of the Radical Party
- The Democratic and Socialist Union of the Resistance
- The Christian-democratic Popular Republican Movement (MRP)
- Valéry Giscard d'Estaing's Independent Republicans
- The Union for a French Democracy

Large majority of the politicians of Nicolas Sarkozy's then-ruling Union for a Popular Movement could have been classified in this family.

==== Bonapartists ====
These included:

- Charles de Gaulle's various parties: first the Rally of the French People,

then the Union of Democrats for the Republic

- But also Boulangisme or Poujadisme

==== Today ====
The Gaullist UDR was then transformed by Jacques Chirac in the Rally for the Republic (RPR) in 1976, a neo-Gaullist party which embraced economic liberalism.

In 2002, the Gaullist RPR and the Union for French Democracy merged into the Union for a Popular Movement(UMP), although some elements of the old UDF remained outside the new alliance. In 2015, the party's name was changed from Union for a Popular Movement (UMP) to The Republicans.

In 2007, a section of the remaining UDF, headed by François Bayrou, refused to align themselves on Nicolas Sarkozy and created the MoDem in an attempt to make space for a center-right party.

In conclusion, Jean-Marie Le Pen managed to unify most of the French far-right in the National Front (FN), created in 1972 in the aftermaths of the Algerian War, which succeeded in gaining influence starting in the 1980s. Despite Le Pen's success in the 2002 presidential election, his party has been weakened by Bruno Mégret's spin-out, leading to the creation of the National Republican Movement, as well as by the concurrence of Philippe de Villiers' Movement for France, and also by the internal struggles concerning Le Pen's forthcoming succession. In 2018, far-right National Front party (FN), led by Marine Le Pen, changed its name to the National Rally (Rassemblement National, RN). Since then, the party has seen several electoral successes, including in the 2022 presidential election and the first round of the 2024 legislative snap elections.

Residual monarchists movements, inheritors of Charles Maurras' Action française, also managed to survive, although many of them joined Le Pen's FN in the 1980s. Some neo-fascists who considered Le Pen to be too moderate broke away in 1974 to form the Parti des forces nouvelles, which maintained close links to the far-right students' union Groupe Union Défense.

Another important theoretical influence in the far-right appeared in the 1980s with Alain de Benoist's Nouvelle Droite movement, organized into the GRECE.

== See also ==
- Anti-nuclear movement in France
- Balladur jurisprudence
- History of the French far right
- History of the Left in France
- History of anarchism in France
- Liberalism and Radicalism in France
- Political party strength in France
- Sinistrisme
