= Pascal Beaudet =

French politician (1956–2022)

Member of the Departmental Council of Seine-Saint-Denis
- In office 2 April 2015 – 27 June 2021
- Preceded by: position established
- Succeeded by: Samuel Martin
- Constituency: Canton of Aubervilliers

Mayor of Aubervilliers
- In office 5 April 2014 – 21 January 2016
- Preceded by: Jacques Salvator
- Succeeded by: Meriem Derkaoui
- In office 31 March 2003 – 22 March 2008
- Preceded by: Jack Ralite
- Succeeded by: Jacques Salvator

Personal details
- Born: 9 October 1956 France
- Died: 17 March 2022 (aged 65) France
- Party: PCF

Pascal Beaudet (French pronunciation: [paskal bodɛ]; 9 October 1956 – 17 March 2022) was a French politician. A member of the French Communist Party (PCF), he was mayor of Aubervilliers from 2003 to 2008 and again from 2014 to 2016. He was then General Councilor of the Canton of Aubervilliers from 2011 to 2015, and a member of the Departmental Council of Seine-Saint-Denis from 2015 to 2021.

== Biography ==
A former teacher and activist in Aubervilliers, Beaudet was first elected to the commune's municipal council in 1995 as part of the Union de la gauche. In 2002, he joined the PCF. In 1997, he became deputy mayor for citizenship, a position in which he allowed residents to be more involved in public decisions. From 2001 to 2003, he was deputy mayor for education.

On 31 March 2003, Beaudet became mayor of Aubervilliers. He immediately launched the construction of two new schools: the École Anne-Sylvestre and the École Angela-Davis. He also gained approval for the Paris Métro Line 12 to open a stop at Mairie d'Aubervilliers, as well as a shopping center, Le Millénaire. In 2007, he announced that he would run for re-election in the 2008 French municipal elections.

In June 2007, Beaudet ordered the eviction of squatters who had settled in front of a school. The incident gained controversy when Secretary of State for Foreign Affairs and Human Rights Rama Yade made an improvised visit to the spot, causing Beaudet to reverse his position and support rehousing for the evicted.

For the 2008 election, Beaudet received support from the PCF and the rest of the communist left, but the Socialist Party rallied behind Jacques Salvator. After gaining more votes in the first round, Beaudet was defeated in the second round by Salvator and left his mandate as mayor of Aubervilliers.

Back in the municipal council, Beaudet ran for general councilor of the Canton of Aubervilliers-Est, a position held by Salvator's wife, Évelyne Yonnet. With support from the Left Front, he defeated Yonnet in the second round. In 2014, he defeated Salvator and returned to the mayorship of Aubervilliers. The following year, he was elected to the Departmental Council of Seine-Saint-Denis in tandem with his deputy mayor Meriem Derkaoui.

In June 2014, Beaudet declared that the commune of Aubervilliers will no longer fund extracurricular activities after school, saving 1.8 million euros. The move was denounced by the Fédération des Conseils de Parents d'Elèves, pointing out that other municipalities had continued the funding. During his second mandate, he strongly criticized the national government and supported a reduction in cultural and construction projects, stances which were unpopular with citizens of Aubervilliers. In January 2016, he resigned as mayor, replaced by his deputy, Derkaoui,[14] while retaining his spot on the municipal council. He cited fatigue from quarrels within the divided majority as reasoning for his resignation.

In September 2018, he was elected as the Left Front group's president of Grand Paris. In 2018, novelist Didier Daeninckx wrote Artana ! Artana !, in which Patrick Muletier, mayor of the fictional town Courvilliers, was involved in drug trafficking and electoral fraud. The press largely believed this character was based on Beaudet during his time as mayor of Aubervilliers.

Pascal Beaudet died on 17 March 2022 at the age of 65.
