= Paris Organising Committee for the 2024 Olympic and Paralympic Games =

Organizing committee for the 2024 Olympic and Paralympic games

The Paris Organising Committee for the 2024 Olympic and Paralympic Games (COJOP2024) (French: Comité d'Organisation des Jeux Olympiques et Paralympiques de Paris 2024) is the organising committee for the 2024 Summer Olympics and the 2024 Summer Paralympics which were held in Paris, France. Tony Estanguet serves as president of the committee. Étienne Thobois serves as director general. The committee was established on 18 January 2018.

The committee has an agreement with the TOCOG2020 of the 2020 Summer Olympics and Paralympics to share knowledge and expertise. The committee also has an agreement with the organising committee of the 2026 Winter Olympics and Paralympics to share knowledge and resources as well as joint communication and advocacy.

== Board of directors ==
The board of directors consists of the following members and it includes representatives of several public bodies and society.

- Tony Estanguet, president
- Bernard Lapasset, honorary president
- Guy Drut and Jean-Christophe Rolland, members of the International Olympic Committee (IOC)
- Brigitte Henriques, president of French National Olympic and Sports Committee (Comité national olympique et sportif français, CNOSF)
- Didier Seminet, secretary general of the CNOSF
- Gwladys Épangue and Fabien Gilot, co-presidents of the High Level Athletes' Commission (Commission des athlètes de haut-niveau, CAHN)
- Evelyne Ciriegi, president of the Greater Paris Regional Olympic and Sports Committee (Comité Régional Olympique et Sportif Ile-de-France, CROSIF)
- Marie-Amélie Le Fur, president of the French Paralympic and Sports Committee (Comité Paralympique et Sportif Français, CPSF)
- Guislaine Westelynck, president of the French Handisport Federation (Fédération Française Handisport, FFH)
- Cyril Moré, representative of Paralympic athletes
- Tanguy de La Forest, secretary general of the French Paralympic and Sports Committee
- Valérie Barlois-Mevel-Leroux, president of the French Olympians Association
- Guy Forget, athlete selected by the organising committee
- Martin Fourcade, athlete selected by the organising committee
- Nantenin Keita, athlete selected by the organising committee
- Sarah Ourahmoune, athlete selected by the organising committee

Representatives of public bodies:

- Anne Hidalgo, mayor of Paris, representative of Council of Paris
- Emmanuel Grégoire, deputy mayor of Paris, representative of Council of Paris
- Pierre Rabadan, deputy for sports, representative of Council of Paris
- Valérie Pécresse, president of Regional Council of Île-de-France, representative of the Greater Paris region
- Patrick Karam, vice-president of the Regional Council of Île-de-France
- Vincent Roger, Special Envoy of the Regional Council of Île-de-France to the Olympic and Paralympic Games
- Roxana Mărăcineanu, Minister Delegate for Sport, attached to the Minister of National Education, Youth and Sport, government representative
- Sophie Cluzel, Secretary of State for People with Disabilities, government representative
- Olivier Dussopt, Minister Delegate for Public Accounts, attached to the Minister of the Economy, Finance and the Recovery, government representative
- Stéphane Troussel, president of Departmental Council of Seine-Saint-Denis
- Mathieu Hanotin, departmental advisor, representative of Departmental Council of Seine-Saint-Denis, also president of the Plaine Commune combined authority
- Patrick Ollier, president of Greater Paris
- Quentin Gesell, mayor of Dugny, representative of Greater Paris area
- Benoît Payan, mayor of Marseille, representative of authorities beyond the Greater Paris area
- Michel Cadot, Interministerial Delegate for the 2024 Olympic and Paralympic Games
- Nicolas Ferrand, CEO of SOLIDEO
- Jean-Baptiste Borsali, mayor of Le Bourget, representative of Terres d'Envol combined authority

Representatives of society:

- Bernard Thibault, member of governing board of the International Labour Organization
- Geoffroy Roux de Bézieux, chair of Movement of the Enterprises of France (Mouvement des Entreprises de France, MEDEF)
- Alexandre Mars, president/founder of the Epic Foundation
- Alain Rochon, president of APF France handicap
- Michel Cymes, doctor and surgeon
- Stéphanie Goujon, CEO of Agence du Don en Nature
- Ryadh Sallem, Paralympian, founder of CAPSAAA foundation (Cap sport art aventure amitié Paris)

== Athletes' Commission ==
The Athletes’ Commission is focused on the experience of the athletes competing at the 2024 Olympics and Paralympics and the commission consists of following 18 members:

- Martin Fourcade, Olympic biathlete and president of the commission
- Julien Benneteau, Olympic tennis player
- Marie Bochet, Paralympic alpine skier
- Perle Bouge, Paralympic rower
- Lucas Créange, Paralympic table tennis player
- Théo Curin, Paralympic swimmer
- Hélène Defrance, Olympic sailor
- Stéphane Diagana, Olympic athlete
- Gévrise Émane, Olympic judoka
- Gwladys Épangue, Olympic taekwondo practitioner
- Guillaume Gille, Olympic handball player
- Fabien Gilot, Olympic swimmer
- Astrid Guyart, Olympic fencer
- Jessica Harrison, Olympic triathlete
- Fanny Horta, Olympic rugby union player
- Michaël Jérémiasz, Paralympic wheelchair tennis player
- Florian Rousseau, Olympic track cyclist
- Diandra Tchatchouang, Olympic basketball player (she joined after Marine Johannès left the commission in April 2019)

== See also ==
- 2024 Summer Olympics
- 2024 Summer Paralympics
