= Political party strength in France =

This article shows the distributions of political power in France starting with the establishment of the French Fifth Republic in October 1958.

== Political party strength under Fifth Republic ==
The following table indicates the great officers in the French Republic :

- President of the Republic
- President of the Senate
- Prime minister
- President of the National Assembly

The table also indicates the historical party composition in the :

- Senate
- National Assembly
- Regional Council
- General Council

The parties are as follows: Left-wing (PS, LFI, EÉLV, allies, and predecessors), Right-wing (LR, RN, allies, and predecessors), Centrist (LREM, UDF, allies, and predecessors), Independents.

Year	Executive offices				Parliament		Local government		European Union		
Year	President of the Republic	Prime minister	President of the Senate	President of the National Assembly	National Assembly	Senate	Regional Councils	General council	French delegation	European commissioner	
1959	Charles de Gaulle (UNR-UDR)	Michel Debré (UNR)	Gaston Monnerville (PRRS)	Jacques Chaban-Delmas (UNR-UDR)	494 - 52	161 - 148	Creation of Regional; Councils				
1960	Charles de Gaulle (UNR-UDR)	Michel Debré (UNR)	Gaston Monnerville (PRRS)	Jacques Chaban-Delmas (UNR-UDR)	494 - 52	161 - 148	Creation of Regional; Councils				
1961	Charles de Gaulle (UNR-UDR)	Michel Debré (UNR)	Gaston Monnerville (PRRS)	Jacques Chaban-Delmas (UNR-UDR)	494 - 52	161 - 148	Creation of Regional; Councils				
1962	Charles de Gaulle (UNR-UDR)	Georges Pompidou (UNR)	Gaston Monnerville (PRRS)	Jacques Chaban-Delmas (UNR-UDR)	324 - 152	152 - 122	Creation of Regional; Councils				
1963	Charles de Gaulle (UNR-UDR)	Georges Pompidou (UNR)	Gaston Monnerville (PRRS)	Jacques Chaban-Delmas (UNR-UDR)	324 - 152	152 - 122	Creation of Regional; Councils				
1964	Charles de Gaulle (UNR-UDR)	Georges Pompidou (UNR)	Gaston Monnerville (PRRS)	Jacques Chaban-Delmas (UNR-UDR)	324 - 152	152 - 122	Creation of Regional; Councils				
1965	Charles de Gaulle (UNR-UDR)	Georges Pompidou (UNR)	Gaston Monnerville (PRRS)	Jacques Chaban-Delmas (UNR-UDR)	324 - 152	147 - 127	Creation of Regional; Councils				
1966	Charles de Gaulle (UNR-UDR)	Georges Pompidou (UNR)	Gaston Monnerville (PRRS)	Jacques Chaban-Delmas (UNR-UDR)	324 - 152	147 - 127	Creation of Regional; Councils				
1967	Charles de Gaulle (UNR-UDR)	Georges Pompidou (UNR)	Gaston Monnerville (PRRS)	Jacques Chaban-Delmas (UNR-UDR)	293 - 194	147 - 127	Creation of Regional; Councils				
1968	Charles de Gaulle (UNR-UDR)	Maurice Couve (UNR-UDR)	Alain Poher (CD-CDS)	Jacques Chaban-Delmas (UNR-UDR)	396 - 91	156 - 127	Creation of Regional; Councils				
1969	Georges Pompidou (UDR)	Jacques Chaban-Delmas (UDR)	Alain Poher (CD-CDS)	Achille Peretti (UDR)	396 - 91	156 - 127	Creation of Regional; Councils				
1970	Georges Pompidou (UDR)	Jacques Chaban-Delmas (UDR)	Alain Poher (CD-CDS)	Achille Peretti (UDR)	396 - 91	156 - 127	Creation of Regional; Councils				
1971	Georges Pompidou (UDR)	Jacques Chaban-Delmas (UDR)	Alain Poher (CD-CDS)	Achille Peretti (UDR)	396 - 91	159 - 124	Creation of Regional; Councils				
1972	Georges Pompidou (UDR)	Pierre Messmer (UDR)	Alain Poher (CD-CDS)	Achille Peretti (UDR)	396 - 91	159 - 124	Creation of Regional; Councils				
1973	Georges Pompidou (UDR)	Pierre Messmer (UDR)	Alain Poher (CD-CDS)	Edgar Faure (UDR)	314 - 176	159 - 124	Creation of Regional; Councils				
1974	Valéry Giscard d'Estaing (IR-RP-UDF)	Jacques Chirac (RPR)	Alain Poher (CD-CDS)	Edgar Faure (UDR)	314 - 176	157 - 126	Creation of Regional; Councils				
1975	Valéry Giscard d'Estaing (IR-RP-UDF)	Jacques Chirac (RPR)	Alain Poher (CD-CDS)	Edgar Faure (UDR)	314 - 176	157 - 126	Creation of Regional; Councils				
1976	Valéry Giscard d'Estaing (IR-RP-UDF)	Raymond Barre (IR-UDF)	Alain Poher (CD-CDS)	Edgar Faure (UDR)	314 - 176	157 - 126	Creation of Regional; Councils				
1977	Valéry Giscard d'Estaing (IR-RP-UDF)	Raymond Barre (IR-UDF)	Alain Poher (CD-CDS)	Edgar Faure (UDR)	314 - 176	161 - 134	Creation of Regional; Councils				
1978	Valéry Giscard d'Estaing (IR-RP-UDF)	Raymond Barre (IR-UDF)	Alain Poher (CD-CDS)	Jacques Chaban-Delmas (RPR)	287 - 200	161 - 134	Creation of Regional; Councils				
1979	Valéry Giscard d'Estaing (IR-RP-UDF)	Raymond Barre (IR-UDF)	Alain Poher (CD-CDS)	Jacques Chaban-Delmas (RPR)	287 - 200	161 - 134	Creation of Regional; Councils				
1980	Valéry Giscard d'Estaing (IR-RP-UDF)	Raymond Barre (IR-UDF)	Alain Poher (CD-CDS)	Jacques Chaban-Delmas (RPR)	287 - 200	160 - 144	Creation of Regional; Councils				
1981	François Mitterrand (PS)	Pierre Mauroy (PS)	Alain Poher (CD-CDS)	Louis Mermaz (PS)	333 - 158	160 - 144	Creation of Regional; Councils				
1982	François Mitterrand (PS)	Pierre Mauroy (PS)	Alain Poher (CD-CDS)	Louis Mermaz (PS)	333 - 158	160 - 144	Creation of Regional; Councils				
1983	François Mitterrand (PS)	Pierre Mauroy (PS)	Alain Poher (CD-CDS)	Louis Mermaz (PS)	333 - 158	179 - 138	Creation of Regional; Councils				
1984	François Mitterrand (PS)	Laurent Fabius (PS)	Alain Poher (CD-CDS)	Louis Mermaz (PS)	333 - 158	179 - 138	Creation of Regional; Councils				
1985	François Mitterrand (PS)	Laurent Fabius (PS)	Alain Poher (CD-CDS)	Louis Mermaz (PS)	333 - 158	179 - 138	Creation of Regional; Councils				
1986	François Mitterrand (PS)	Jacques Chirac (RPR)	Alain Poher (CD-CDS)	Jacques Chaban-Delmas (RPR)	290 - 248	201 - 118	20 - 2				
1987	François Mitterrand (PS)	Jacques Chirac (RPR)	Alain Poher (CD-CDS)	Jacques Chaban-Delmas (RPR)	290 - 248	201 - 118	20 - 2				
1988	François Mitterrand (PS)	Michel Rocard (PS)	Alain Poher (CD-CDS)	Laurent Fabius (PS)	276 - 271	201 - 118	20 - 2				
1989	François Mitterrand (PS)	Michel Rocard (PS)	Alain Poher (CD-CDS)	Laurent Fabius (PS)	276 - 271	211 - 110	20 - 2				
1990	François Mitterrand (PS)	Michel Rocard (PS)	Alain Poher (CD-CDS)	Laurent Fabius (PS)	276 - 271	211 - 110	20 - 2				
1991	François Mitterrand (PS)	Édith Cresson (PS)	Alain Poher (CD-CDS)	Laurent Fabius (PS)	276 - 271	211 - 110	20 - 2				
1992	François Mitterrand (PS)	Pierre Beregovoy (PS)	René Monory (CDS-FD)	Henri Emmanuelli (PS)	276 - 271	203 - 118	20 - 2				
1993	François Mitterrand (PS)	Edouard Balladur (RPR)	René Monory (CDS-FD)	Philippe Séguin (RPR)	485 - 91	203 - 118	20 - 2				
1994	François Mitterrand (PS)	Edouard Balladur (RPR)	René Monory (CDS-FD)	Philippe Séguin (RPR)	485 - 91	203 - 118	20 - 2		41 R - 35 L		
1995	Jacques Chirac (RPR-UMP)	Alain Juppé (RPR)	René Monory (CDS-FD)	Philippe Séguin (RPR)	485 - 91	199 - 122	20 - 2		41 R - 35 L	Édith; Cresson (PS)	Y-T; De Silguy (Ind)
1996	Jacques Chirac (RPR-UMP)	Alain Juppé (RPR)	René Monory (CDS-FD)	Philippe Séguin (RPR)	485 - 91	199 - 122	20 - 2		41 R - 35 L	Édith; Cresson (PS)	Y-T; De Silguy (Ind)
1997	Jacques Chirac (RPR-UMP)	Lionel Jospin (PS)	René Monory (CDS-FD)	Laurent Fabius (PS)	320 - 253	199 - 122	20 - 2		41 R - 35 L	Édith; Cresson (PS)	Y-T; De Silguy (Ind)
1998	Jacques Chirac (RPR-UMP)	Lionel Jospin (PS)	Christian Poncelet (RPR-UMP)	Laurent Fabius (PS)	320 - 253	200 – 121	14 R - 8 L	63 R - 36 L	41 R - 35 L	Édith; Cresson (PS)	Y-T; De Silguy (Ind)
1999	Jacques Chirac (RPR-UMP)	Lionel Jospin (PS)	Christian Poncelet (RPR-UMP)	Laurent Fabius (PS)	320 - 253	200 – 121	14 R - 8 L	63 R - 36 L	40 R - 37 L	Pascal; Lamy (PS)	Michel; Barnier (UMP)
2000	Jacques Chirac (RPR-UMP)	Lionel Jospin (PS)	Christian Poncelet (RPR-UMP)	Raymond Forni (PS)	320 - 253	200 – 121	14 R - 8 L	63 R - 36 L	40 R - 37 L	Pascal; Lamy (PS)	Michel; Barnier (UMP)
2001	Jacques Chirac (RPR-UMP)	Lionel Jospin (PS)	Christian Poncelet (RPR-UMP)	Raymond Forni (PS)	320 - 253	189 – 131	14 R - 8 L	59 R - 40 L	40 R - 37 L	Pascal; Lamy (PS)	Michel; Barnier (UMP)
2002	Jacques Chirac (RPR-UMP)	Jean-Pierre Raffarin (UMP)	Christian Poncelet (RPR-UMP)	Jean-Louis Debré (UMP)	399 - 178	189 – 131	14 R - 8 L	59 R - 40 L	40 R - 37 L	Pascal; Lamy (PS)	Michel; Barnier (UMP)
2003	Jacques Chirac (RPR-UMP)	Jean-Pierre Raffarin (UMP)	Christian Poncelet (RPR-UMP)	Jean-Louis Debré (UMP)	399 - 178	189 – 131	14 R - 8 L	59 R - 40 L	40 R - 37 L	Pascal; Lamy (PS)	Michel; Barnier (UMP)
2004	Jacques Chirac (RPR-UMP)	Jean-Pierre Raffarin (UMP)	Christian Poncelet (RPR-UMP)	Jean-Louis Debré (UMP)	399 - 178	189 - 142	20 L - 2 R	50 L - 49 R	40 L - 31 R	Jacques Barrot (UMP)	
2005	Jacques Chirac (RPR-UMP)	Dominique de Villepin (UMP)	Christian Poncelet (RPR-UMP)	Jean-Louis Debré (UMP)	399 - 178	189 - 142	20 L - 2 R	50 L - 49 R	40 L - 31 R	Jacques Barrot (UMP)	
2006	Jacques Chirac (RPR-UMP)	Dominique de Villepin (UMP)	Christian Poncelet (RPR-UMP)	Jean-Louis Debré (UMP)	399 - 178	189 - 142	20 L - 2 R	50 L - 49 R	40 L - 31 R	Jacques Barrot (UMP)	
2007	Nicolas Sarkozy (UMP)	François Fillon (UMP)	Christian Poncelet (RPR-UMP)	Bernard Accoyer (UMP)	345 - 227	189 - 142	20 L - 2 R	50 L - 49 R	40 L - 31 R	Jacques Barrot (UMP)	
2008	Nicolas Sarkozy (UMP)	François Fillon (UMP)	Gérard Larcher (UMP)	Bernard Accoyer (UMP)	345 - 227	180 - 163	20 L - 2 R	57 L - 42 R	40 L - 31 R	Jacques Barrot (UMP)	
2009	Nicolas Sarkozy (UMP)	François Fillon (UMP)	Gérard Larcher (UMP)	Bernard Accoyer (UMP)	345 - 227	180 - 163	20 L - 2 R	57 L - 42 R	33 L - 30 R	Michel Barnier (UMP)	
2010	Nicolas Sarkozy (UMP)	François Fillon (UMP)	Gérard Larcher (UMP)	Bernard Accoyer (UMP)	345 - 227	180 - 163	21 L - 1 R	57 L - 42 R	33 L - 30 R	Michel Barnier (UMP)	
2011	Nicolas Sarkozy (UMP)	François Fillon (UMP)	Jean-Pierre Bel (PS)	Bernard Accoyer (UMP)	345 - 227	177 - 171	21 L - 1 R	61 L - 39 R	33 L - 30 R	Michel Barnier (UMP)	
2012	François Hollande (PS)	Jean-Marc Ayrault (PS)	Jean-Pierre Bel (PS)	Claude Bartolone (PS)	331 - 229	177 - 171	21 L - 1 R	61 L - 39 R	33 L - 30 R	Michel Barnier (UMP)	
2013	François Hollande (PS)	Jean-Marc Ayrault (PS)	Jean-Pierre Bel (PS)	Claude Bartolone (PS)	331 - 229	177 - 171	21 L - 1 R	61 L - 39 R	33 L - 30 R	Michel Barnier (UMP)	
2014	François Hollande (PS)	Manuel Valls (PS)	Gérard Larcher (LR)	Claude Bartolone (PS)	331 - 229	187 R - 152 L	21 L - 1 R	61 L - 39 R	51 R - 23 L	Pierre Moscovici (PS)	
2015	François Hollande (PS)	Manuel Valls (PS)	Gérard Larcher (LR)	Claude Bartolone (PS)	331 - 229	187 R - 152 L	8 R - 7 L	69 R - 31 L	51 R - 23 L	Pierre Moscovici (PS)	
2016	François Hollande (PS)	Manuel Valls (PS)	Gérard Larcher (LR)	Claude Bartolone (PS)	331 - 229	187 R - 152 L	8 R - 7 L	69 R - 31 L	51 R - 23 L	Pierre Moscovici (PS)	
2017	Emmanuel Macron (LREM)	Édouard Philippe (Horizons)	Gérard Larcher (LR)	François de Rugy (PÉ)	351 C - 146 R - 72 L	206 R - 114 L	8 R - 7 L	69 R - 31 L	51 R - 23 L	Pierre Moscovici (PS)	
2018	Emmanuel Macron (LREM)	Édouard Philippe (Horizons)	Gérard Larcher (LR)	Richard Ferrand (LREM)	351 C - 146 R - 72 L	206 R - 114 L	8 R - 7 L	69 R - 31 L	51 R - 23 L	Pierre Moscovici (PS)	
2019	Emmanuel Macron (LREM)	Édouard Philippe (Horizons)	Gérard Larcher (LR)	Richard Ferrand (LREM)	351 C - 146 R - 72 L	206 R - 114 L	8 R - 7 L	69 R - 31 L	31 R - 25 C - 23 L	Thierry Breton (Ind)	
2020	Emmanuel Macron (LREM)	Jean Castex (Ind)	Gérard Larcher (LR)	Richard Ferrand (LREM)	351 C - 146 R - 72 L	215 R - 107 L	8 R - 7 L	69 R - 31 L	31 R - 25 C - 23 L	Thierry Breton (Ind)	
2021	Emmanuel Macron (LREM)	Jean Castex (Ind)	Gérard Larcher (LR)	Richard Ferrand (LREM)	351 C - 146 R - 72 L	215 R - 107 L	8 L - 7 R - 1 C	65 R - 26 L - 4 C	31 R - 25 C - 23 L	Thierry Breton (Ind)	
2022	Emmanuel Macron (LREM)	Élisabeth Borne (LREM-TdP)	Gérard Larcher (LR)	Yaël Braun-Pivet (LREM)	249 C - 164 R - 154 L	215 R - 107 L	8 L - 7 R - 1 C	65 R - 26 L - 4 C	31 R - 25 C - 23 L	Thierry Breton (Ind)	

== See also ==
- Government and politics in France
- Politics of France
