= Véronique Riotton =

French politician

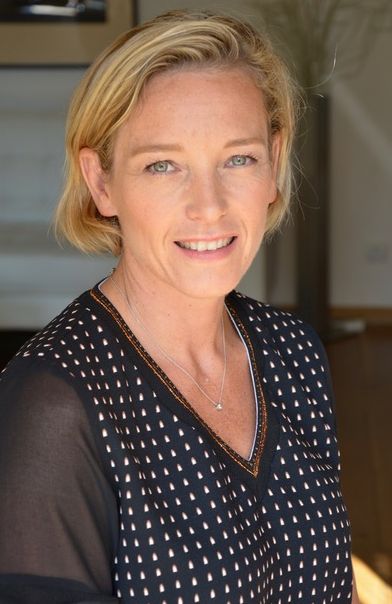

Member of the National Assembly for Haute-Savoie's 1st constituency
- In office 21 June 2017 – 9 June 2024
- Preceded by: Bernard Accoyer

Personal details
- Born: 2 November 1969 (age 56) Bonneville, Haute-Savoie, France
- Party: La République En Marche!

Véronique Riotton (born 2 November 1969 in Bonneville, Haute-Savoie) is a French politician of La République En Marche! (LREM) who has been serving as a member of the French National Assembly since the 2017 elections, representing the department of Haute-Savoie.

== Political career ==
In parliament, Riotton serves on the Sustainable Development, Spatial and Regional Planning Committee, which she briefly chaired in 2020. In addition to her committee assignments, she is a member of the French-Nepalese Parliamentary Friendship Group and the French delegation to the Inter-Parliamentary Union (IPU).

From 2018 until 2019, Riotton was one of five deputy chairpersons of the LREM parliamentary group, under the leadership of chairman Gilles Le Gendre.

She was re-elected in the 2022 election.

== Political positions ==
In July 2019, Riotton voted in favour of the French ratification of the European Union’s Comprehensive Economic and Trade Agreement (CETA) with Canada.

== See also ==
- 2017 French legislative election
- 2022 French legislative election
