= Claude Bartolone =

French politician

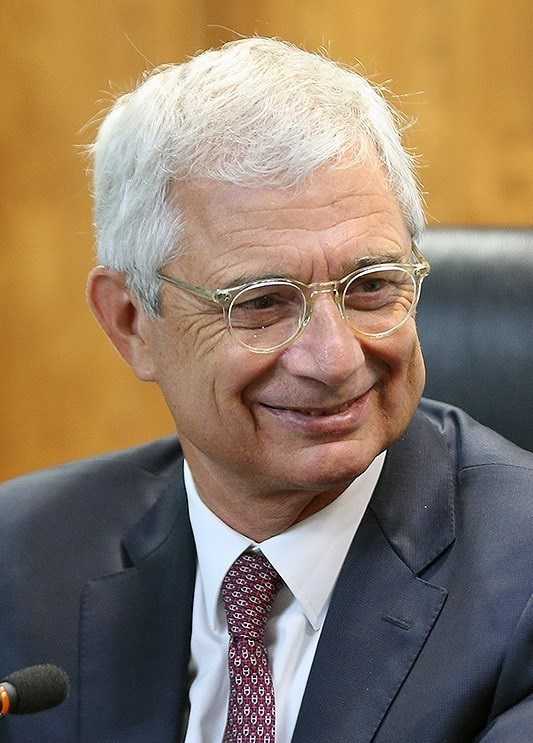
- Bartolone in 2016

President of the National Assembly
- In office 26 June 2012 – 20 June 2017
- Preceded by: Bernard Accoyer
- Succeeded by: François de Rugy

President of the General Council of Seine-Saint-Denis
- In office 20 March 2008 – 4 September 2012
- Preceded by: Hervé Bramy
- Succeeded by: Stéphane Troussel

Delegate Minister for the City
- In office 30 March 1998 – 6 May 2002
- Prime Minister: Lionel Jospin
- Preceded by: Éric Raoult
- Succeeded by: Jean-Louis Borloo

Member of the French National Assembly
- In office 20 June 2012 – 20 June 2017
- Preceded by: Élisabeth Guigou
- Succeeded by: Sabine Rubin
- Constituency: Seine-Saint-Denis's 9th
- In office 2 July 1981 – 19 June 2012
- Preceded by: Jacqueline Chonavel
- Succeeded by: Élisabeth Guigou
- Constituency: Seine-Saint-Denis's 6th

Personal details
- Born: 29 July 1951 (age 75) Tunis, French Tunisia
- Party: Socialist Party (1974-2022)
- Spouse: Véronique Ragusa
- Education: Pierre and Marie Curie University

Claude Bartolone (French pronunciation: [klod baʁtɔlɔn]; born 29 July 1951) is a French politician who served as President of the National Assembly of France from 2012 to 2017.

A member of the Socialist Party from 1974 to 2022, Bartolone was first elected to the National Assembly, representing the Seine-Saint-Denis department, in 1981. He served as Delegate Minister for the City in the government of Prime Minister Lionel Jospin from 1998 to 2002, and he was President of the Seine-Saint-Denis General Council from 2008 to 2012.

== Early life and education ==
Bartolone was born on 29 July 1951 in Tunis, Tunisia. His mother was from Malta and his father from Sicily; both his parents were working-class. At the age of nine, he moved to Le Pré-Saint-Gervais in France and grew up in a council estate.

After he was encouraged by a teacher named Marie-Thérèse Thoullieux not to get a professional degree, Bartolone attended the Lycée Turgot in Paris. He received a Bachelor of Science in Mathematics.

== Political career ==
=== Career in local politics ===
Bartolone was a municipal councillor of Le Pré-Saint-Gervais from 1977 to 1983, and from 1995 to 2008. He served as Deputy Mayor of Le Pré-Saint-Gervais from 1977 to 1983, from June to October 1995, as Mayor from 1995 to 1998, and again as Deputy Mayor from 2001 to 2008. He was also municipal councillor of Les Lilas from 1983 to 1989.

Bartolone served as Seine-Saint-Denis general councillor from 1979 to 1992, and has served again since 2008. From 1985 to 1992, he served as vice-president of the Seine-Saint-Denis General Council, and as president from 2008 to 2012. From 1998 to 2002, he served as regional councillor of Ile-de-France.

=== Career in national politics ===
Bartolone served as a member of the National Assembly for the sixth district, encompassing Seine-Saint-Denis from 1981 to 1998. From 1998 to 2002, he served as Delegate Minister for the City. From 2002, he served as member of the National Assembly again.

When Martine Aubry took over as leader of the Socialist Party in 2008, Bartolone joined the party’s leadership and was put in charge of relations to other Socialist parties internationally. In the Socialist Party's 2011 primaries, he endorsed Aubry as the party's candidate for the 2012 presidential election.

Following the June 2012 parliamentary election, in which the Socialist Party won a parliamentary majority, Bartolone was designated as the Socialist candidate for the post of President of the National Assembly. In the vote, held on 26 June 2012, Bartolone was accordingly elected to the post, receiving 298 votes against 185 votes for the Union for a Popular Movement (UMP) candidate Bernard Accoyer, who held the post during the preceding parliamentary term.

Candidates	Parties		Socialist Primary		First round	
Candidates	Parties		Votes	%	Votes	%
Bernard Accoyer	Union for a Popular Movement (Union pour un mouvement populaire)	UMP			185	38.30%
Claude Bartolone	Socialist Party (Parti socialiste)	PS	127	49.22%	298	61.70%
Jean Glavany	Socialist Party (Parti socialiste)	PS	59	22.87%		
Élisabeth Guigou	Socialist Party (Parti socialiste)	PS	50	19.38%		
Daniel Vaillant	Socialist Party (Parti socialiste)	PS	22	8.53%		

From 2012 to 2017, Bartolone served as President of the National Assembly of France. Thus, he lived in the Hôtel de Lassay.

Ahead of the Socialist Party's 2012 convention in Toulouse, Bartolone publicly endorsed Jean-Christophe Cambadélis as candidate to succeed Martine Aubry at the party's leadership. Ahead of the party's 2017 primaries, he endorsed Manuel Valls as its candidate for the presidential election later that year.

== Controversy ==
In April 2013, Bartolone received a menacing letter containing ammunition powder, suggesting he should stop supporting same-sex marriage.

When President François Hollande gave a public speech in 2016 honoring the centennial of François Mitterrand, Bartolone walked out; shortly before, Gérard Davet and François Lhomme from daily Le Monde had quoted Hollande in their book, “A President Shouldn’t Say That”, as saying that Bartolone “doesn’t have the stature to be prime minister” and “is not big on charisma.”

== Personal life ==
Bartolone is married, in a second marriage, with Véronique Ragusa, a parliamentary collaborator. He resides in a 320 square metre mansion on the outskirts of Paris.

== Honours ==
=== Foreign Honours ===
- Italy : Knight Grand Cross of the Order of Merit of the Italian Republic (19/11/2012)

Political offices
Vacant Title last held by Éric Raoult	Delegate Minister for the City; 1998–2002	Succeeded by Jean-Louis Borloo
Preceded by Bernard Accoyer	President of the French National Assembly; 2012–2017	Succeeded by François de Rugy
