= Haute-Savoie's 1st constituency =

Constituency of the National Assembly of France

1st constituency of Haute-Savoie
- inline Constituency of the National Assembly of France

- Constituency in Department

- Haute-Savoie in France
- Deputy: Véronique Riotton; RE
- Department: Haute-Savoie

The 1st constituency of Haute-Savoie is a French legislative constituency in Haute-Savoie.

== Historic representation ==
Election	Member	Party
1958	Charles Bosson	MRP
1962	Charles Bosson	CD
1967	Charles Bosson	CD
1968	Jean Brocard	RI
1973	Jean Brocard	RI
1978	Jean Brocard	UDF
1981	Jean Brocard	UDF
1986	Proportional representation	
1988	Jean Brocard	UDF
1993	Bernard Accoyer	RPR
1997	Bernard Accoyer	RPR
2002	Bernard Accoyer	UMP
2007	Bernard Accoyer	UMP
2012	Bernard Accoyer	UMP
2017	Véronique Riotton	LREM
2022	Véronique Riotton	LREM
2024	Véronique Riotton	RE

== Election results ==
=== 2024 ===
Legislative Election 2024: Haute-Savoie's 1st constituency
Party	Candidate	Votes	%	±%
DIV	Florian Thabuis	6,527	8.28	n/a
REC	Claudine Molin	937	1.19	−3.29
LO	Jacques Mattei	675	0.86	n/a
RN	Guilaume Roit-Levêque	24,500	31.09	+14.88
DIV	Stéphane Espic	98	0.12	n/a
RE (Ensemble)	Véronique Riotton	28,079	35.64	−0.71
LFI (NFP)	Anne-Valérie Duval	17,980	22.82	−1.03
Turnout		78,796	97.41	+49.08
Registered electors		110,684		
2nd round result
RE	Véronique Riotton	49,165	64.23	+1.58
RN	Guilaume Roit-Levêque	28383	35.77	n/a
Turnout		76,547	95.28	+48.93
Registered electors		110,725		
RE hold		Swing		

=== 2022 ===
Legislative Election 2022: Haute-Savoie's 1st constituency
Party	Candidate	Votes	%	±%
LREM (Ensemble)	Véronique Riotton	19,000	36.35	-12.61
LFI (NUPÉS)	Anne-Valérie Duval	12,464	23.85	+11.98
RN	Didier Jouffrey	8,472	16.21	+5.98
LR (UDC)	Aurélia Patty Gomila	6,830	13.07	−5.77
REC	Guillaume Jambard	2,341	4.48	N/A
Others	N/A	3,161	-	−
Turnout		52,268	48.83	−0.31
2nd round result
LREM (Ensemble)	Véronique Riotton	29,312	62.65	-1.67
LFI (NUPÉS)	Anne-Valérie Duval	17,477	37.35	N/A
Turnout		49,312	46.35	+7.37
LREM hold				

=== 2017 ===
Legislative Election 2017: Haute-Savoie's 1st constituency
Party	Candidate	Votes	%	±%
LREM	Véronique Riotton	23,631	47.96	
LR	Annabel Andre-Laurent	9,285	18.84	
FN	Brigitte Thiery-Audubert	5,072	10.29	
LFI	Julian Auge	3,199	6.49	
EELV	Jean-Jacques Bouchet	1,414	2.87	
PS	Christophe Poncet	1,235	2.51	
Others	N/A	5,434		
Turnout		49,271	49.14	
2nd round result
LREM	Véronique Riotton	25,174	64.32	
LR	Annabel Andre-Laurent	13,962	35.68	
Turnout		39,136	38.98	
LREM gain from LR				

=== 2012 ===
2012 legislative election in Haute-Savoie's 1st constituency
Candidate	Party	First round		Second round	
Candidate	Party	Votes	%	Votes	%
Bernard Accoyer	UMP	23,511	43.45%	27,473	56.06%
Christian Jeantet	PS	16,936	31.30%	21,535	43.94%
André Adobati	FN	6,799	12.56%		
Claude Comet	EELV	2,763	5.11%		
Eliane Chazal Vindret	FG	1,709	3.16%		
Raphaël Gallet	DLR	783	1.45%		
Stéphane Gogibus	LT	541	1.00%		
Sylvain Socquet-Juglard	AEI	348	0.64%		
Hamdy Boussouiba	MEI	320	0.59%		
Bethsabée Lunel	NPA	222	0.41%		
Jean-Paul Macé	LO	179	0.33%		
Valid votes		54,111	98.79%	49,008	97.30%
Spoilt and null votes		660	1.21%	1,358	2.70%
Votes cast / turnout		54,771	58.79%	50,366	54.02%
Abstentions		38,393	41.21%	42,877	45.98%
Registered voters		93,164	100.00%	93,243	100.00%

=== 2007 ===
Legislative Election 2007: Haute-Savoie's 1st constituency
Party	Candidate	Votes	%	±%
UMP	Bernard Accoyer	33,573	56.07	
PS	Sylvie Gillet de Thorey	15,532	25.94	
FN	Jacques Vassieux	2,856	4.77	
LV	Jean-Marie Decout	2,127	3.55	
DIV	Roland Dufournet	1,356	2.26	
Others	N/A	4,430		
Turnout		61,026	58.63	
UMP hold				

=== 2002 ===
Legislative Election 2002: Haute-Savoie's 1st constituency
Party	Candidate	Votes	%	±%
UMP	Bernard Accoyer	29,050	49.70	
PS	Sylvie Gillet de Thorey	14,660	25.08	
FN	Jacques Vassieux	6,770	11.58	
Others	N/A	7,971		
Turnout		59,620	64.68	
2nd round result
UMP	Bernard Accoyer	31,591	64.15	
PS	Sylvie Gillet de Thorey	17,654	35.85	
Turnout		50,871	55.19	
UMP hold				

=== 1997 ===
Legislative Election 1997: Haute-Savoie's 1st constituency
Party	Candidate	Votes	%	±%
RPR	Bernard Accoyer	19,022	38.51	
PS	Sylvie Gillet de Thorey	10,946	22.16	
FN	Jacques Vassieux	7,116	14.41	
LV	Françoise Rouge	3,920	7.94	
PCF	Manuela Gomez	2,498	5.06	
LDI	Yolande Trouillet	2,431	4.92	
GE	Alex Chabans	2,250	4.56	
EXG	Evelyne Tonnelier	1,207	2.44	
Turnout		53,385	65.47	
2nd round result
RPR	Bernard Accoyer	30,250	58.49	
PS	Sylvie Gillet de Thorey	21,469	41.51	
Turnout		55,667	68.27	
RPR hold				
