= Republican empire =

A republican empire is a form of government in which a country governed as a republic transitions into an empire. Examples of this process include the French First Republic, which became the First French Empire, as well as the Dutch Republic, which formed a Dutch Empire by seizing territory from Spain. The distinction between a republican empire and a more traditional monarchy is that the people are assumed to be the source of government power. In France, for example, voters were asked in a referendum in 1804 whether they supported the creation of an empire.

== Historical examples ==
The Roman Empire is probably the best known example of a republican empire. Originally, Rome was a monarchy, ruled directly by an absolute ruler. The king was later overthrown and replaced with a Republican system that protected certain rights of the citizens. Over time, the republic broke down as the Roman senate started to cede more and more authority to the consul. When Augustus took power the senate gave him the title of "Imperator", or "emperor" in English.

== See also ==
- American imperialism
- Popular monarchy
