= Canton of Aubervilliers =

Coordinates: 48.91°N 2.38°E

The canton of Aubervilliers is an administrative division of the Seine-Saint-Denis department, Île-de-France region, northern France. It was created at the French canton reorganisation which came into effect in March 2015. Its seat is in Aubervilliers.

It consists of the following communes:

1. Aubervilliers
