= Stéphane Troussel =

French politician (born 1970)

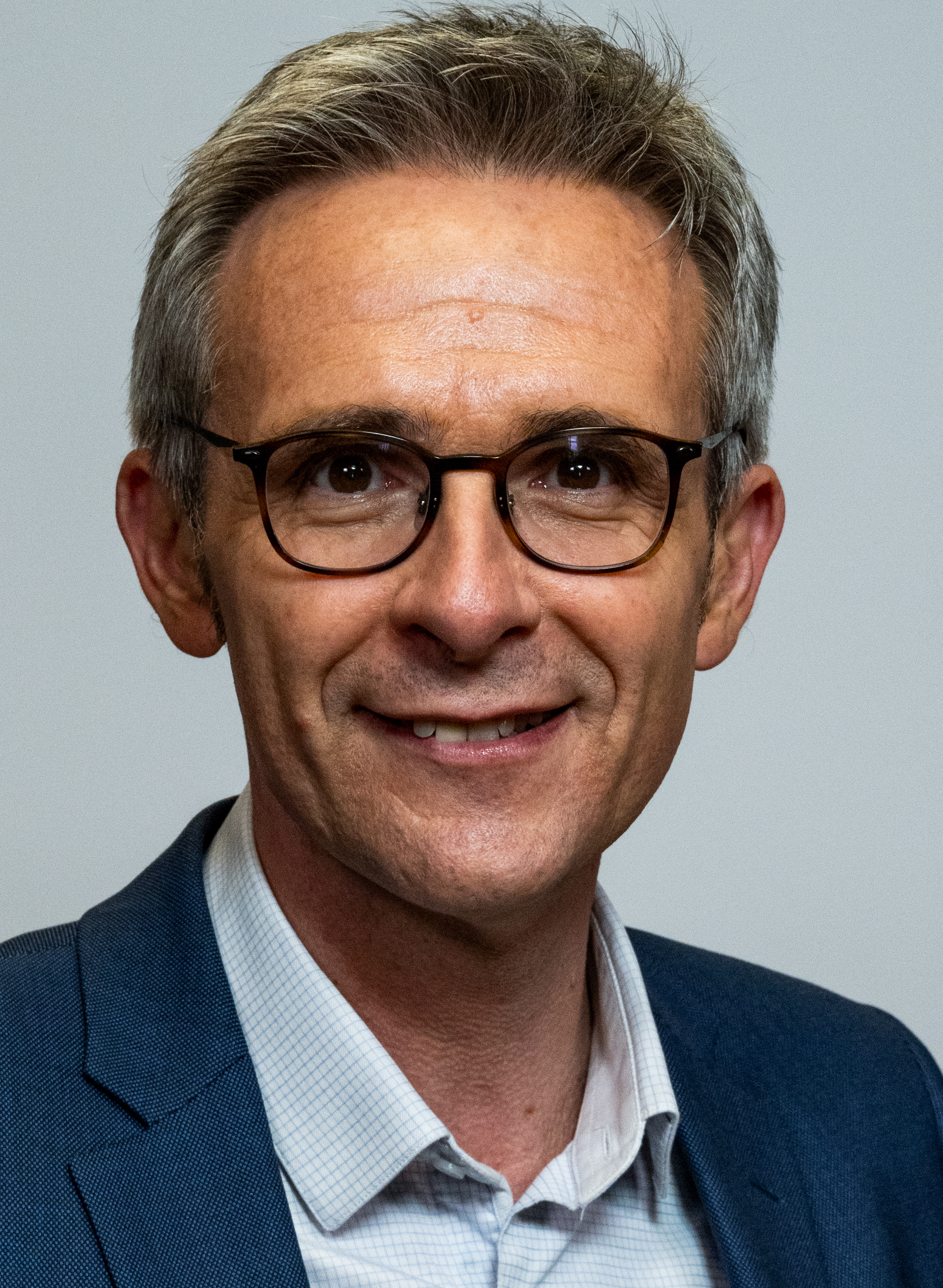
- Troussel in 2012

President of the Departmental Council of Seine-Saint-Denis
- Incumbent
- Assumed office 4 September 2012
- Preceded by: Claude Bartolone

Personal details
- Born: 7 April 1970 (age 56)
- Party: Socialist Party

Stéphane Troussel (born 7 April 1970) is a French politician of the Socialist Party. Since 2012, he has served as president of the Departmental Council of Seine-Saint-Denis. He has been a member of the departmental council since 2004, and has served as a municipal councillor of La Courneuve since 1995.
