= Popular monarchy =

Monarchical titles referring to people rather than territories

Popular monarchy is a term used by Kingsley Martin (1936) for monarchical titles referring to a people rather than a territory. This was the norm in classical antiquity and throughout much of the Middle Ages, and such titles were retained in some of the monarchies of 19th- and 20th-century Europe.

During the French Revolution, Louis XVI had to change his title to indicate he was "king of the French" rather than "king of France", paralleling the title of "king of the Franks" (rex Francorum) used in Francia, the antecedent state comprising what would later become France and Germany. Napoleon Bonaparte would emulate this when he was crowned Emperor of the French.

Currently, Belgium has the only explicit popular monarchy, the formal title of its king being King of the Belgians rather than King of Belgium. Accordingly, the King of Belgium has no crown, nor a coronation ceremony.

== List of royal and imperial titles ==
Country	Title	Notes
Albanian Kingdom	King of the Albanians	Used by King Zog I, the monarch of the Albanian Kingdom, from 1928 de facto to 1939, and de jure until 1946. King Victor Emmanuel III, who claimed the Albanian throne between 1939 and 1943, used the title King of Albania.
Kingdom of Belgium	King of the Belgians	Used since the constitutional oath of Leopold I in 1831. The Belgian popular monarchy is the sole currently in use. The holders of the title have been Leopold I, Leopold II, Albert I, Leopold III, Baudouin, Albert II, and currently Philippe.
Bulgarian Empire	Emperor of the Bulgarians	Variants: Ruler of the many Bulgarians, Emperor of the Bulgarians and the Romans, Tsar of the Bulgarians, Emperor of Bulgarians and Vlachs, the Romanslayer, Emperor of the Bulgarians and the Greeks, In Christ the Lord Faithful Emperor and Autocrat of the Bulgarians, In Christ the Lord Faithful Emperor and Autocrat of all Bulgarians and Greeks
Kingdom of Bulgaria	King of the Bulgarians	The official title of Ferdinand I in 1908–1918, Ferdinand's son Boris III (1918–1943) and Boris' son Simeon II (1943 – at least to 1946) was: by the Grace of God and the People's Will King of the Bulgarians. Ferdinand I was elected by the National Assembly as Prince of Bulgaria in 1887.
Kingdom of the Burgundians	King of the Burgundians	The title was used from Gjúki to Godomar.
Byzantine Empire	Emperor of the Romans	Used in the Greek form Basileus Rhomaíōn at least since Emperor Maurice.
Kingdom of Croatia	King of the Croats	Kralj Hrvata in Croatian, Rex Chroatorum in Medieval Latin, which was later extended to King of the Croats and the Dalmatians (Kralj Hrvata i Dalmatinaca or Rex Chroatorum Dalmatarumque).
Kingdom of England	King of the Anglo-Saxons or King of the English	Rex Anglorum Saxonum or Rex Anglorum in Medieval Latin. Used by the Anglo-Saxon kings of England. The title King of the Anglo-Saxons was first adopted by Alfred the Great when the people of Mercia accepted him as their ruler in the late 9th century. The first king to style himself King of the English was Æthelstan when he conquered the Norse Kingdom of York in 927, making him the first ruler of a united England.
Kingdom of East Anglia	King of the East Angles	Latin: Rex Anglorum Orientalium
Kingdom of Essex	King of the East Saxons	Latin: Rex Saxonum Orientalium
East Francia	King of the East Franks	Latin: Rex Francorum Orientalium
East Francia	King of the Franks	Used by the Carolingians from Pepin the Short. Also used in medieval France and by the Ottonian Holy Roman Emperors-elect.
Frankish Empire	King of the Franks	Used by the Carolingians from Pepin the Short. Also used in medieval France and by the Ottonian Holy Roman Emperors-elect.
Kingdom of France (West Francia)	King of the Franks	Used by the Carolingians from Pepin the Short. Also used in medieval France and by the Ottonian Holy Roman Emperors-elect.
Kingdom of France (West Francia)	King of the West Franks	Latin: Rex Francorum Occidentalium
Kingdom of France (West Francia)	King of the French	Used by Louis XVI from 1791 to 1792, and by Louis Philippe I from 1830 until 1848.
French Empire	Emperor of the French	Used by Napoleon I, Napoleon II (however briefly and ceremonially), and Napoleon III during their various reigns.
Kingdom of the Gepids	King of the Gepids	
Holy Roman Empire	King of the Romans, Roman King; King of the Germans	Titles of the Emperors-elect. Latin: Rex Romanorum/Teutonicorum, German: König der Römer, Römischer König, König der Deutschen
Holy Roman Empire	Emperor of the Romans	Official title of the Holy Roman Emperors; Latin: Imperator Romanorum
Holy Roman Empire	German-Roman Emperor	English realisation of the common German-language title for the Holy Roman Emperors: Römisch-deutscher Kaiser; literally: Roman-German Emperor
Kingdom of the Gewisse	King of the Gewisse	Title later became King of the West Saxons as the Gewisse expanded (see Kingdom of Wessex)
Kingdom of Götaland	King of the Geats	Götar konung in Swedish, Rex Getarum/Gothorum in Medieval Latin. Title attributed to legendary and historical kings of the North Germanic Geats.
Kingdom of Greece	King of the Hellenes	Used for the Greek monarchs from 1863, when the House of Glücksburg ascended the throne, until the monarchy's abolition in 1973 (the King had been in exile since 1967). King Otto, however, who reigned from May 1832 until his deposition and expulsion in October 1862, had been styled as King of Greece.
Kingdom of Kent	King of the Cantware (Kentish Men)	Latin: Rex Cantuariorum
Khazar Khaganate	Khagan of the Khazars	
Kingdom of the Lombards	King of the Lombards	Rex Langobardorum in Medieval Latin.
Kingdom of Norway	King/Lord of the Norwegians	The first Norwegian king, Harald Fairhair, used the style King/Lord of the Norwegians (dróttin Norðmanna), in the oldest source of his life in Haraldskvæði. Subsequent Norwegian kings used similar titles, like his son Håkon the Good who was called King of the Norwegians (Norðmanna gram)
Kingdom of the Ostrogoths	King of the Ostrogoths	
Kingdom of Portugal	King of the Portuguese	The first Portuguese king, Afonso Henriques, used the style King of the Portuguese (Rex Portugalensium), to remember that he was elected on the battlefield, after the Battle of Ourique (1139), by his fellows and subjects; their descendants, instead, used the style of King of Portugal (Rex Portugaliae or later in Rei de Portugal).
Roman Empire	Roman Emperor	Used in the Latin form Imperator romanus.
Kingdom of Romania	King of the Romanians	Used from 1881 until 1947. The holders of the title were Carol I, Ferdinand I, Carol II and Michael I.
Kingdom of the Rugii	King of the Rugii	
Kingdom of Scotland	King of Scots	This usage became less common with William III and Mary II, who chose to be called King and Queen of Scotland. The Acts of Union 1707 abolished the Scottish and English thrones and created the Kingdom of Great Britain.
Kingdom of Serbia / Serbian Empire	King of Serbia and Emperor of the Serbs	Used between 1346 and 1371. цар Срба и Грка / car Srba i Grka in Serbian. This title was soon enlarged into "Emperor and Autocrat of all the Serbs and Greeks, the Bulgarians, Vlachs and Albanians".
Kingdom of Serbia / Kingdom of Yugoslavia	King of Serbs, Croats and Slovenes or King of Yugoslavia	Used from 1918 to 1929, when the title was changed to King of Yugoslavia. The holders of the title were Peter I and Alexander I.
Kingdom of the Suebi	King of the Suevi in Galicia	
Kingdom of Sussex	King of The South Saxons	Latin: Rex Sussaxonum, Rex Suthaxonum
Kingdom of Sweden	King of the Swedes, the Goths, and the Wends	Used in the Swedish form Sveriges, Götes och Vendes konung until 1973. Thereafter simply King of Sweden (Sveriges konung).
Kingdom of the Vandals and Alans	King of the Vandals	
Kingdom of the Visigoths	King of the Visigoths	
Principality of Wales	Prince of the Welsh	Evolving from King of the Britons, before mediatising in the 12th century as Prince of the Welsh. Eventually, Dafydd II of Gwynedd and Wales adopted the title Prince of Wales to denote suzerainty over the whole of Wales, not just the Welsh people.
Kingdom of Wessex	King of the West Saxons	

== See also ==
- Revolutions of 1830
- Pater Patriae
