= Bernard Accoyer =

French politician (born 1945)

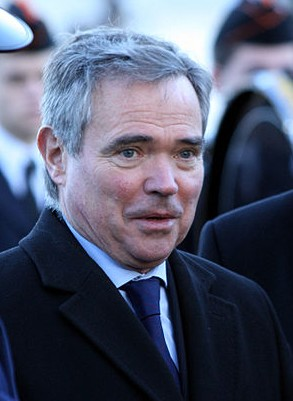
- Accoyer in 2008

Secretary-General of the Republicans
- In office 2016–2017
- Preceded by: Éric Woerth
- Succeeded by: Annie Genevard

President of the National Assembly
- In office 26 June 2007 – 19 June 2012
- Preceded by: Patrick Ollier
- Succeeded by: Claude Bartolone

Member of the National Assembly
- In office 1993–2017
- Constituency: Haute-Savoie's 1st

Mayor of Annecy-le-Vieux
- In office 1989–2016

Personal details
- Born: 12 August 1945 (age 80) Lyon, France
- Party: The Republicans (2015–present)
- Other political affiliations: Rally for the Republic (until 2002); Union for a Popular Movement (2002–2015)
- Spouse: Charlotte Jacquier
- Children: 3
- Education: University of Lyon
- Profession: Physician
- Website: Campagne du député Bernard Accoyer

Bernard Accoyer (French pronunciation: [bɛʁnaʁ akɔje], born 12 August 1945 in Lyon) is a French politician who was President of the National Assembly of France from 2007 to 2012. He was also the Mayor of Annecy-le-Vieux.

== Political career ==
=== Career in local politics ===
Accoyer, a doctor by profession, has served as Mayor of Annecy-le-Vieux since March 1989; he also served as a member of the General Council of Haute-Savoie from March 1992 to March 1998.

=== Member of the National Assembly ===
Accoyer served as a deputy for the first constituency of Haute-Savoie and was first elected to the National Assembly in the March 1993 parliamentary election; he has been re-elected in each election since. He was President of the Union for a Popular Movement (UMP) group in the National Assembly of France from 2004 to 2007.

In 2007, Accoyer was selected as the candidate of the UMP group, which has the absolute majority, for the presidency of the National Assembly. He became the President of the National Assembly on 26 June 2007.

On 6 November 2007, Accoyer was among the guests invited to the state dinner hosted by U.S. President George W. Bush in honor of President Nicolas Sarkozy at the White House.

Despite the unwritten tradition that the President of the National Assembly abstains from taking part in votes, Accoyer voted in favor of a bill providing for major constitutional changes on 21 July 2008; because the bill passed by only a one-vote margin, his vote in favor, along with that of Socialist deputy Jack Lang, was crucial.

Political offices
Preceded by Patrick Ollier	President of the French National Assembly; 2007–2012	Succeeded by Claude Bartolone
Party political offices
Preceded by Éric Woerth	Secretary-General of the Republicans; 2016–2017	Succeeded by Annie Genevard
