= Departmental Council of Seine-Saint-Denis =

The Departmental Council of Seine-Saint-Denis (French: Conseil départemental de la Seine-Saint-Denis) is the deliberative assembly of the Seine-Saint-Denis department in France.

It consists of 30 members (general councilors) and its headquarters are in Bobigny, capital of the department, and the president is Stéphane Troussel. The general councilors are elected for a 6-years term. The Seine-Saint-Denis General Council includes 8 vice-presidents.

== The president ==
The president of the General Council is currently Stéphane Troussel.

== The general councilors ==
The General Council consists of 30 general councilors (conseillers généraux) who come from the 21 cantons of Seine-Saint-Denis.

== See also ==
- Seine-Saint-Denis
- Departmental council (France)

== Website ==
- Seine-Saint-Denis General Council (in French)
