= Jeanneney =

Jeanneney is a French surname. Notable people with the surname include:

- Jean-Noël Jeanneney (born 1942), French historian and politician, son of Jean-Marcel
- Jules Jeanneney (1864–1957), French lawyer and politician
- Jean-Marcel Jeanneney (1910–2010), French government minister, son of Jules
