= René Capitant =

French lawyer and politician (1901–1970)

French Minister of Justice
- In office 31 May 1968 – 27 April 1969
- President: Charles de Gaulle
- Prime Minister: Georges Pompidou; Maurice Couve de Murville
- Preceded by: Louis Joxe
- Succeeded by: Jean-Marcel Jeanneney

Personal details
- Born: 19 August 1901 La Tronche, France
- Died: 23 May 1970 (aged 68) Suresnes, France
- Party: UNR; PRS

René Marie Alphonse Charles Capitant (19 August 1901 in La Tronche, Isère – 23 May 1970 in Suresnes) was a French lawyer and politician.

He was the son of a lawyer, Henri Capitant, and attended the Lycée Henri-IV in Paris. He received his Juris Doctor degree also in Paris.

In 1930, he was appointed to the faculty of the University of Strasbourg and became a member of the Comité de vigilance des intellectuels antifascistes, an anti-fascist organization of intellectuals.

During World War II, he was involved in the creation of the resistance movement Combat in Clermont-Ferrand. He had to leave the country and became a law professor at the University of Algiers in 1941. After the Liberation, he became the Minister of Public Education in the provisional government.

From 1945 to 1951, he was a leftist Gaullist member of the National Assembly of France. In 1946, he founded, with Louis Vallon, the Union gaulliste. He was later to serve as the Secretary General of the Democratic Union of Labour.

After 1951, he was a law professor in Paris and was named director of the Franco-Japanese House in Tokyo from 1957 to 1960. He was then re-elected to the National Assembly from 1962 to 1968.

He served as the Minister of Justice (Garde des Sceaux) in the Georges Pompidou and Couve de Murville governments from 1968 to 1969.

Political offices
Preceded by Louis Joxe	Minister of Justice; 1968–1969	Succeeded by Jean-Marcel Jeanneney
