= Commandos de France =

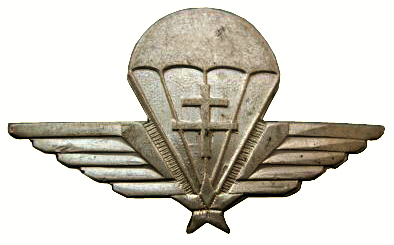
- Insignia of the Commandos de France
- Active: 1944–1945
- Country: France
- Branch: French Army
- Type: Infantry
- Role: Paratrooper infantry

Commanders
- Notable commanders: Henri d'Astier de La Vigerie

The Commandos de France, later known as the 3e bataillon de choc, was a paratrooper unit of the French Army formed in May 1944 in Staoueli, Algeria. It was dissolved on October 1, 1945 to become the third battalion of the 1st Airborne Shock Infantry Regiment first RICAP within the 24th division.

== Formation and designations ==
- May 1944: Creation of the "Group of Commandos de France" in French Algeria.
- August 17, 1944: Landed in Saint-Tropez (Var, France). A "Special Detachment" performed intelligence and harassment missions, becoming the first French troops to engage German forces in Provence.
- January 1, 1945: Redesignated as the third shock battalion. Together with the Bataillon de Choc, it formed the first group.
- October 1, 1945: The third shock battalion was dissolved to form part of the first RICAP.

== Historical context ==
The "Shock" units, established in 1943 in Algeria, specialized in guerrilla warfare, commando operations, and supporting the French Resistance. By 1945, these units were consolidated into three shock groupings, each with two battalions:

=== 1st Group ===
Commanded by Lieutenant Colonel Fernand Gambiez:

- 1st Shock Battalion
- 3rd Shock Battalion (Commandos de France)

=== 2nd Group ===
Commanded by Commander Quinche

- 2nd Shock Battalion (Janson de Sailly Battalion)
- 4th Shock Battalion (Cluny Commandos)

=== 3rd Group ===
Commanded by Lieutenant Colonel Bouvet

- 5th Shock Battalion (Commandos of Africa)
- 6th Shock Battalion (Commandos of Provence)

== Operations and combat history ==
The unit was created by Henri d'Astier de La Vigerie, Louis Vallon, and René Cerf-Ferrière to assist the Maquis. Initially modeled on the Commandos d'Afrique, they trained in Staoueli for infiltration, sabotage, and surprise attacks.

After a delayed deployment to France due to American resistance, a Special Detachment led by Henri d'Astier de La Vigerie clandestinely sailed to Saint-Tropez, participating in early engagements at Les Pennes-Mirabeau before joining the main unit.

During its operations, the unit suffered heavy casualties in battles such as:

- Haut du Tôt (November 3, 1944): Heavy frontal assault in the Vosges.
- Durrenentzen (January 31, 1945): A failed attack on a well-defended German position.

The unit later advanced into Germany, participating in battles across the Black Forest and capturing strategic locations like Karlsruhe and Pforzheim.

=== Casualties ===
By the end of the war:

- Killed: 134 (including 25 officers)
- Wounded: 293
- Missing: 21

== Insignia ==
The unit's insignia featured the Cross of Lorraine, symbolizing resistance and liberty.

== Notable commanders ==
- Lieutenant Colonel Fernand Gambiez
- Commander Louis Vallon
- Commander Henri d'Astier de La Vigerie

== Legacy ==
The Commandos de France were awarded the Croix de Guerre 1939–1945 with a palm for their exceptional service.

== Bibliography ==
- Maja Destrem, Les commandos de France, Fayard, 1982. ISBN 2-213-01169-9
- Raymond Muelle, Bataillons de Choc et Commandos, Presses de la Cité, 1997. ISBN 2-258-04031-0
