= Albert Lebrun =

President of France from 1932 to 1940

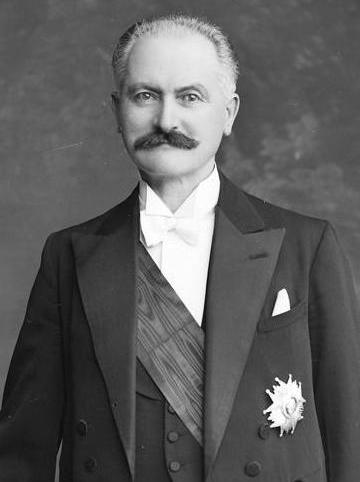
- Lebrun in 1932

President of France
- In office 10 May 1932 – 11 July 1940
- Prime Minister: See list: André Tardieu; Édouard Herriot; Joseph Paul-Boncour; Édouard Daladier; Albert Sarraut; Camille Chautemps; Gaston Doumergue; Pierre-Étienne Flandin; Fernand Bouisson; Pierre Laval; Léon Blum; Paul Reynaud; Philippe Pétain
- Preceded by: Paul Doumer (Note: André Tardieu served as acting president from Doumer's assassination until Lebrun took office)
- Succeeded by: Philippe Pétain (as Chief of the French State); Vincent Auriol (1947)

President of the Senate of France
- In office 11 June 1931 – 10 May 1932
- Preceded by: Paul Doumer
- Succeeded by: Jules Jeanneney

Minister of the Liberated Regions of France
- In office 23 November 1917 – 6 November 1919
- President: Raymond Poincaré
- Prime Minister: Georges Clemenceau
- Preceded by: Charles Jonnart
- Succeeded by: André Tardieu

Minister of the Colonies of France
- In office 9 December 1913 – 3 June 1914
- President: Raymond Poincaré
- Prime Minister: Gaston Doumergue
- Preceded by: Jean Morel
- Succeeded by: Maurice Maunoury
- In office 27 June 1911 – 12 January 1913
- President: Armand Fallières
- Prime Minister: Joseph Caillaux; Raymond Poincaré
- Preceded by: Adolphe Messimy
- Succeeded by: René Besnard

Minister of War of France
- In office 12 January 1913 – 20 January 1913
- President: Armand Fallières
- Prime Minister: Raymond Poincaré
- Preceded by: Alexandre Millerand
- Succeeded by: Eugène Étienne

President of the General Council of Meurthe-et-Moselle
- In office 20 August 1906 – 10 May 1932
- Preceded by: Alfred Mézières
- Succeeded by: Albert Tourtel

Personal details
- Born: 29 August 1871 Mercy-le-Haut, France
- Died: 6 March 1950 (aged 78) Paris, France
- Cause of death: Pneumonia
- Party: Democratic Republican Alliance
- Spouse: Marguerite Nivoit
- Children: 2
- Education: École polytechnique École des mines de Paris
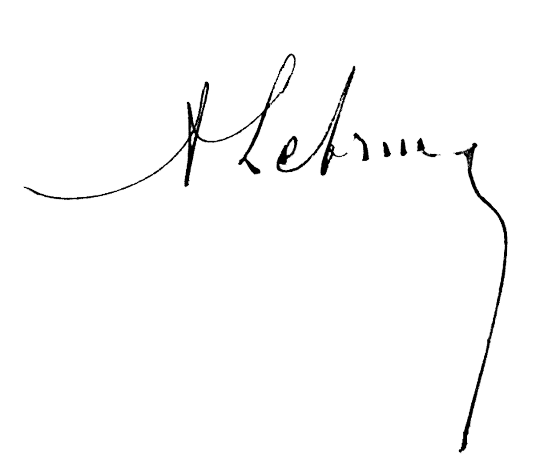
- Signature

Albert François Lebrun (French: [albɛʁ ləbʁœ̃]; 29 August 1871 – 6 March 1950) was a French politician who served as President of France from 1932 to 1940. He was the last president of the Third Republic before its dissolution into the rump state of Vichy France in the early days of the Second World War. He was a member of the centre-right Democratic Republican Alliance (ARD).

== Early life ==
Born to a farming family in Mercy-le-Haut, Meurthe-et-Moselle, he attended the École Polytechnique and the École des Mines de Paris, graduating from both at the top of his class. He then became a mining engineer in Vesoul and Nancy, but left that profession at the age of 29 to enter politics.

== Career in politics ==
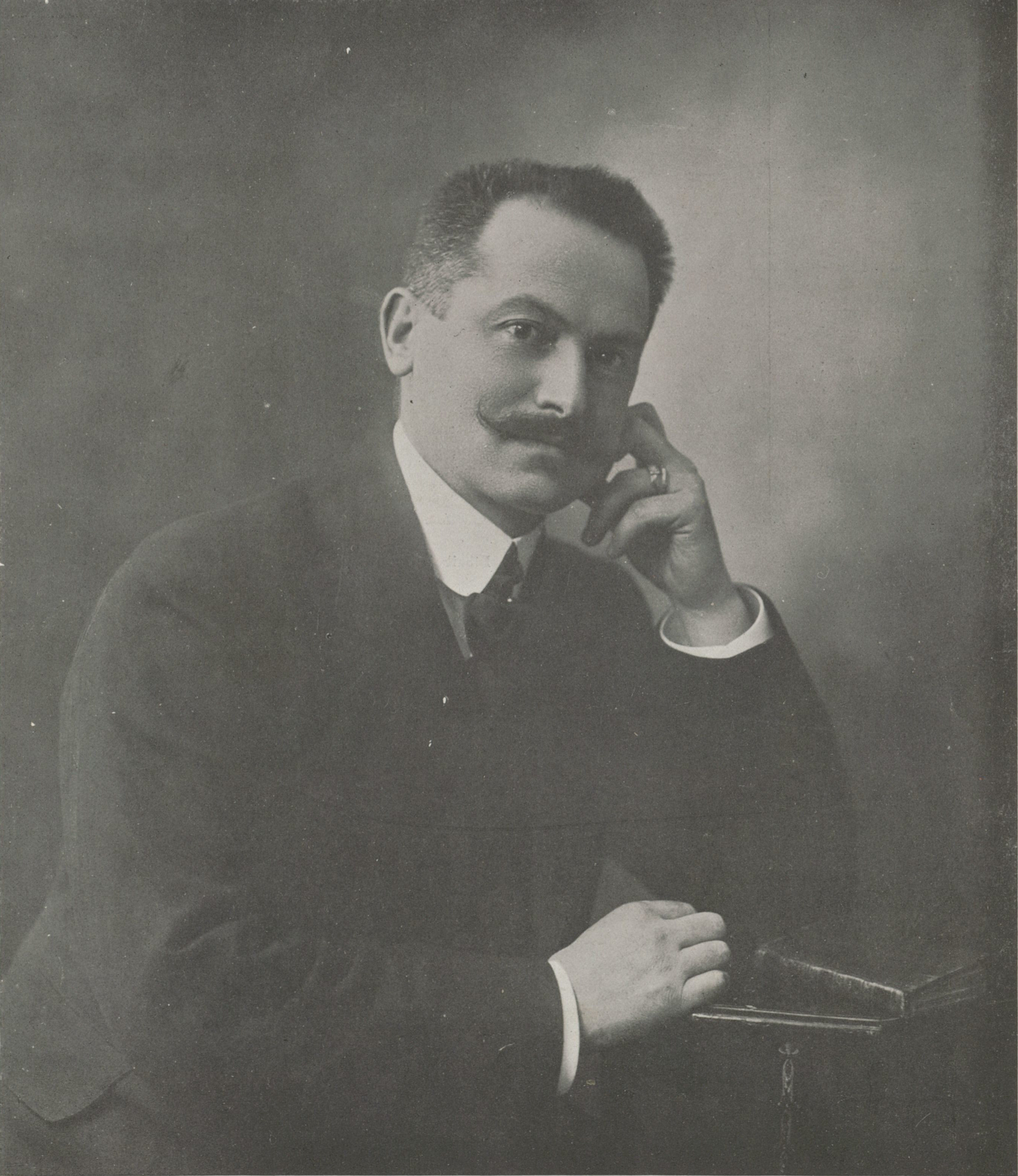
Albert Lebrun, 1911

Lebrun won a seat in the Chamber of Deputies in 1900 as a member of the Left Republican Party, later serving on the cabinet as Minister for the Colonies from 1912 to 1914, Minister of War in 1913 and Minister for Liberated Regions from 1917 to 1919. Joining the Democratic Alliance, he was elected to the French senate from Meurthe-et-Moselle in 1920, and served as Vice President of the Senate from 1925 through 1929. He was president of that body from 1931 to 1932.

== President of France (1932-1940) ==
Lebrun was elected President of France by the newly elected Chamber of Deputies following the assassination of President Paul Doumer by Paul Gorguloff on 6 May 1932. Re-elected in 1939, largely because of his record of accommodating all political sides, he exercised little power as president.

In June 1940, with the military collapse of France imminent, Lebrun wrote "the uselessness of the struggle was demonstrated. An end must be made." With the Cabinet wanting to ask for an armistice, on 17 June 1940 Prime Minister Paul Reynaud resigned, recommending to President Lebrun that he appoint Marechal Philippe Pétain in his place, which he did that day. British General Sir Edward Spears, who was present with the French cabinet during this crisis wrote "it is clear that the President had made up his mind that France was free of her obligations to Britain, and was at liberty to ask for an armistice [with Germany] if she deemed it to be in her interests to do so."

On 10 July 1940, Lebrun enacted the Constitutional Law of 10 July 1940, which the National Assembly had voted for by 569 votes to 80, allowing Prime Minister Philippe Pétain to promulgate a new constitution. On 11 July, Lebrun was replaced by Pétain as head of state.

== After dissolution ==
Lebrun fled to Vizille (Isère) on 15 July, but was captured on 27 August 1943, when the Germans moved into the region. He was then sent into captivity at the Itter Castle in Tyrol. On 10 October 1943 he was allowed to return to Vizille due to illness, but was kept under constant surveillance.

On 15 August 1944, Operation Dragoon began. One week later, Grenoble, Vizille and other cities were freed. The German 19th Army withdrew quickly.

On 11 October 1944, Lebrun met with Charles de Gaulle and acknowledged the General's leadership. Conveniently forgetting the new Constitutional Law he had enacted in 1940, Lebrun said that he had not formally resigned as president because the dissolution of the National Assembly had left nobody to accept his resignation. Whether or not de Gaulle accepted this lie is unknown. During the post-war Pétain trial "all the available celebrities of the Third Republic testified, including Lebrun, all whitewashing themselves". Lebrun argued again that he had never officially resigned. De Gaulle made no mystery of his low opinion of Lebrun, and wrote of him in his memoirs: "As a head of state he lacked two things: there was no state, and he wasn't a head."

After the war, Lebrun lived in retirement. He died of pneumonia in Paris on 6 March 1950 after a protracted illness.

=== Personal life ===
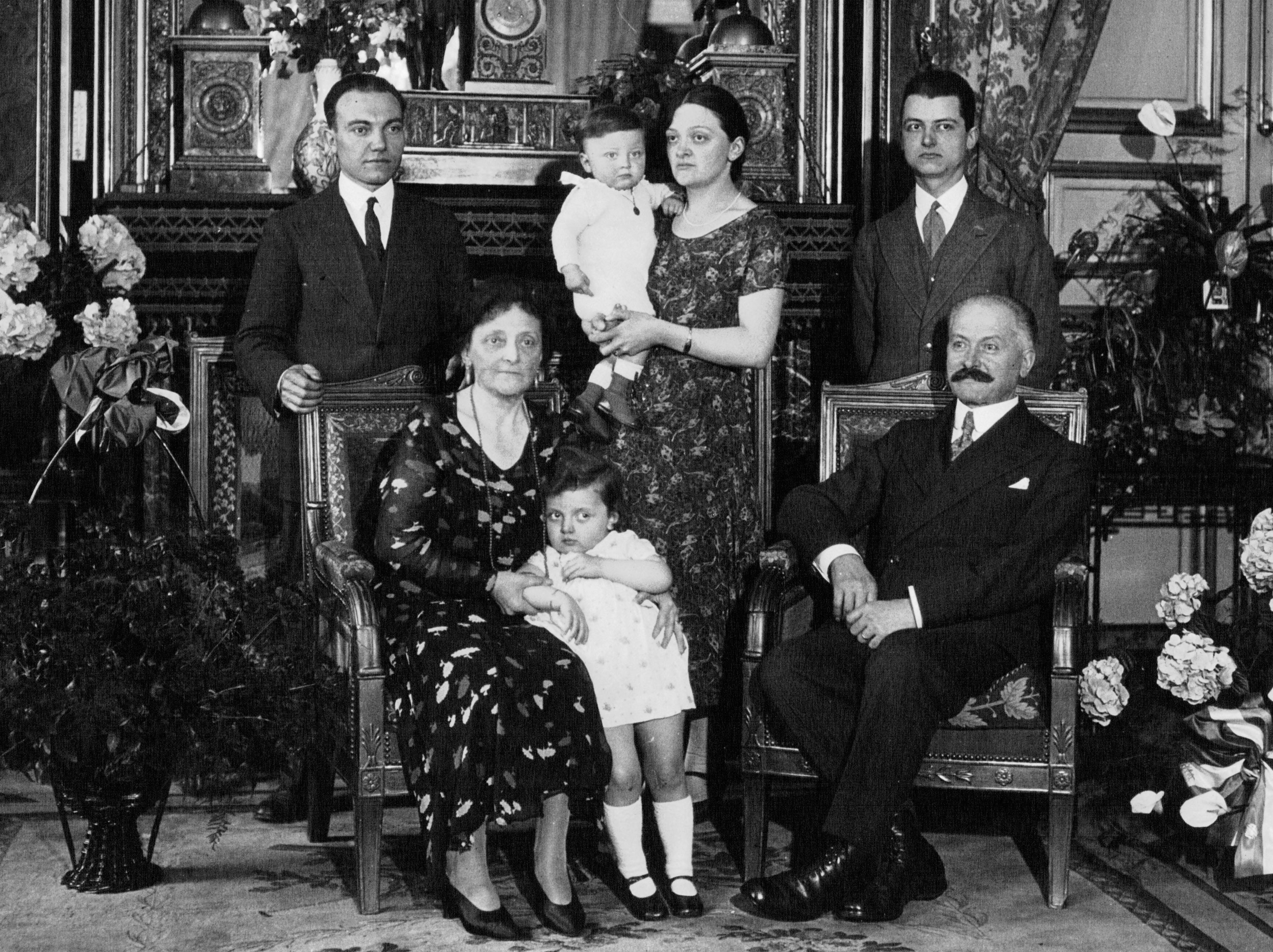
Albert Lebrun and his family at the Elysée Palace in 1932

Lebrun was married to Marguerite Lebrun (née Nivoit). Together they had two children: a son, Jean, and a daughter, Marie.

== Honours and awards ==
- Grand-Croix of the Order of Legion of Honour (1932)
- Chevalier of Supreme Order of Christ (1935 - Vatican)
- Order of the Royal House of Chakri (1934 - Kingdom of Siam)
- Knight of the Order of the Bath (1938 - United Kingdom)

== Notes ==
Political offices
Preceded by Adolphe Messimy	Minister of the Colonies; 1911–1913	Succeeded by René Besnard
Preceded by Alexandre Millerand	Minister of War; 1913	Succeeded by Eugène Étienne
Preceded by Jean Morel	Minister of the Colonies; 1913–1914	Succeeded by Maurice Maunoury
Preceded by Charles Jonnart	Minister of Liberated Regions; 1917–1919	Succeeded by André Tardieu
Preceded by Paul Doumer	President of the Senate; 1931–1932	Succeeded by Jules Jeanneney
Preceded by Paul Doumer	President of France; 1932–1940	Vacant Title next held by Vincent Auriol
Regnal titles
Preceded by Paul Doumer	Co-Prince of Andorra; 1932–1940; Served alongside: Justí Guitart i Vilardebó	Succeeded by Philippe Pétain
