= Mercy-le-Haut =

- Commune
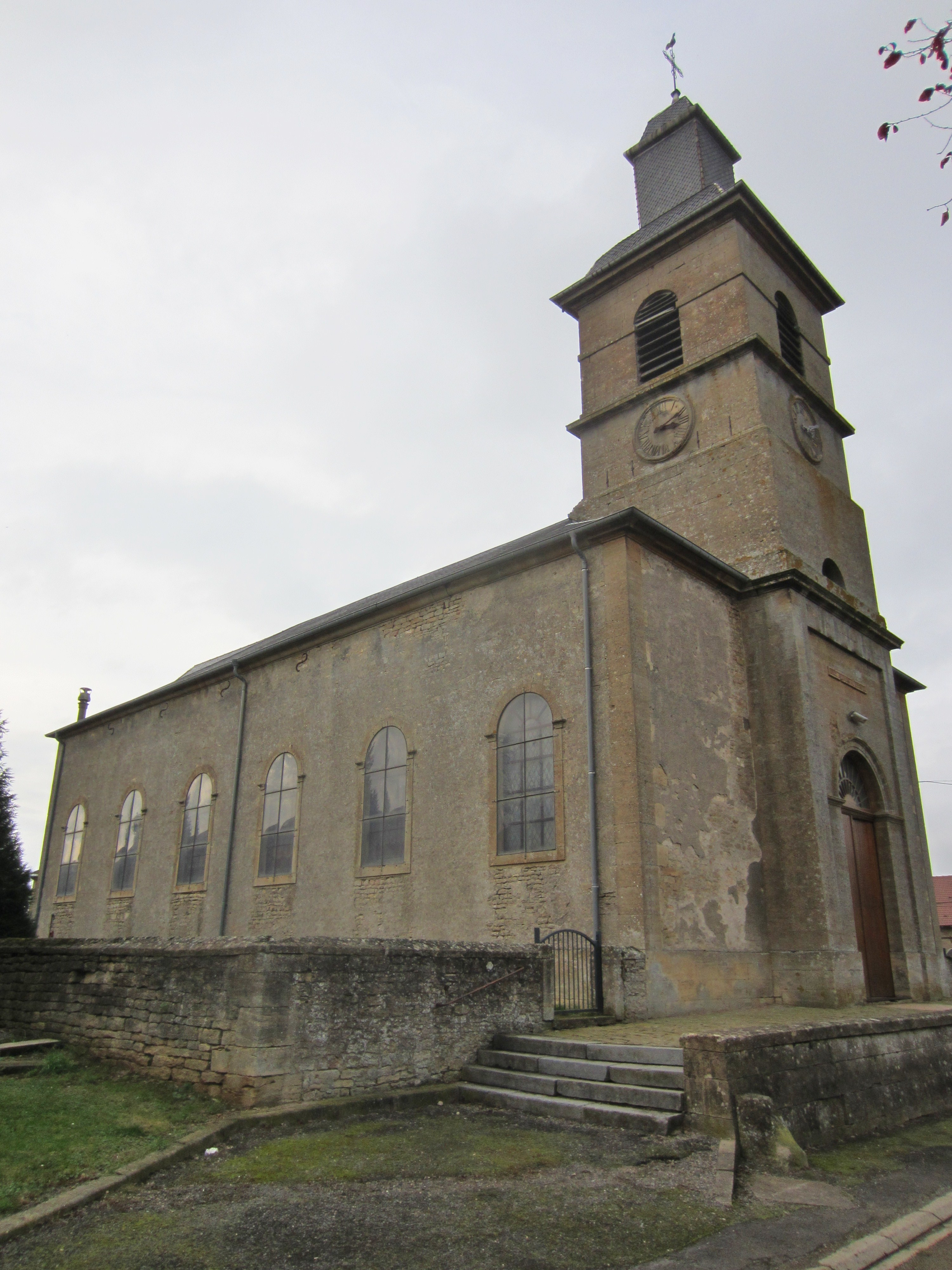
- The church in Mercy-le-Haut

- Coat of arms
- Location of Mercy-le-Haut
- Location within France Location within Grand Est
- Coordinates: 49°22′07″N 5°49′35″E
- Country: France
- Region: Grand Est
- Department: Meurthe-et-Moselle
- Arrondissement: Val-de-Briey
- Canton: Pays de Briey
- Intercommunality: Cœur du Pays-Haut

Government
  - Mayor (2024–2026): Diane Marchand
- Area^{1}: 13.35 km^{2} (5.15 sq mi)
- Highest elevation: 377 m (1,237 ft)
- Lowest elevation: 298 m (978 ft)
- Population (2023): 276
  - Density: 20.7/km^{2} (53.5/sq mi)
- Time zone: UTC+01:00 (CET)
  - Summer (DST): UTC+02:00 (CEST)
- INSEE/Postal code: 54363 /54560
- ^{1} French Land Register data, which excludes lakes, ponds, glaciers > 1 km^{2} (0.386 sq mi or 247 acres) and river estuaries.

Mercy-le-Haut (French pronunciation: [mɛʁsi lə o]) is a commune in the Meurthe-et-Moselle department in north-eastern France. Albert Lebrun, President of France between 1932 and 1940, was born in the town.

== See also ==
- Communes of the Meurthe-et-Moselle department
