= Marguerite Lebrun =

French politician (1878–1947)

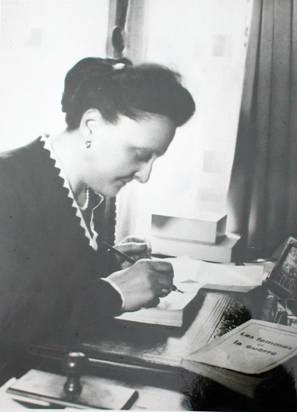
- Marguerite Lebrun in February 1940.

Spouse of the President of France
- In role 10 May 1932 – 11 July 1940
- President: Albert Lebrun
- Preceded by: Blanche Doumer
- Succeeded by: Michelle Auriol (1947)

Personal details
- Born: Jeanne Emilie Marguerite Nivoit; October 12, 1878 Mézières, Ardennes, France
- Died: October 25, 1947 (aged 69) Paris, France
- Spouse: Albert Lebrun (m. 1935; died 1947)

Marguerite Jeanne Emilie Marguerite Lebrun (née Nivoit; October 12, 1878 - October 25, 1947) was the wife of Albert Lebrun, who was President of France from 1932 to 1940.

Together Lebrun and her husband had two children: son Jean Lebrun and daughter Marie Lebrun. Jean Lebrun married Bernadette Marin, the daughter of a retired army captain, in the town hall in Rambouillet, France, on 17 October 1932.

She was the "godmother" of the legendary ocean liner SS Normandie and the ship Paul Doumer, named for the previous French president.

Unofficial roles
Preceded by Blanche Doumer	Spouse of the President of France; 1932–1940	Vacant Title next held by Michelle Auriol
