= Louis Vallon =

Member of the French National Assembly
- In office 11 July 1968 – 1 April 1973
- Preceded by: Claude Estier
- Succeeded by: Roger Chinaud
- Constituency: Paris's 25th constituency

Member of the French National Assembly
- In office 6 December 1962 – 2 April 1967
- Preceded by: Paul Mazurier
- Succeeded by: Constituency dissolved
- Constituency: 10th constituency of Seine-et-Oise

Member of the French National Assembly
- In office 5 July 1951 – 1 December 1955
- Preceded by: New seat
- Succeeded by: Dissolution of RPF
- Constituency: 4th constituency of the Seine (Fourth Republic)

Personal details
- Born: 12 August 1901 Crest, Drôme, France
- Died: 1 March 1981 (aged 79) 13th arrondissement of Paris, France
- Party: RPF; UDT; UDR
- Spouse: Suzanne Braun-Vallon
- Profession: Engineer

Louis Vallon (12 August 1901 – 1 March 1981) was a French politician. Initially a member of the SFIO and the French Socialist Party before World War II, he later became a left-wing Gaullist, a founding member of the Rally of the French People (RPF), the UDT, and the UDR. Vallon served as a deputy for the RPF from 1951 to 1955, for the UDT from 1962 to 1967, and finally for the UDR from 1968 to 1973.

== Biography ==
Louis Vallon was a graduate of the prestigious École Polytechnique (class of 1921). He joined the Socialist youth movement and the SFIO in 1923, supporting Pierre Renaudel. After running unsuccessfully as an SFIO candidate in the 1932 legislative elections, Vallon left the SFIO in 1933 to join Marcel Déat's French Socialist Party - Jean Jaurès Union. He co-authored the "Plan of 9 July 1934," which proposed national reform, uniting members from various political backgrounds.

In 1936, Vallon rejoined the SFIO and later aligned himself with the Popular Front. He was appointed director of social broadcasts for Radiodiffusion française by Léon Blum but became critical of the Front's economic policies.

=== World War II and Resistance ===
Vallon served in the French Army during the German invasion of France in 1940 and later joined the French Resistance. In London, he became head of the political section of the Bureau Central de Renseignements et d’Action (BCRA). He was also a founder of the Commandos de France, a Resistance military unit.

After the war, Vallon served as deputy director in Charles de Gaulle's cabinet and held various administrative roles. He joined the RPF in 1947, becoming its regional delegate and later its national secretary for social action.

=== Parliamentary career ===
Vallon was elected to the National Assembly in 1951 as a deputy for the Rally of the French People (RPF). After the RPF's dissolution, he sat as an independent. He re-entered the Assembly in 1962 under the UNR-UDT coalition and was known for his progressive economic policies, notably his support for worker participation in corporate profits.

He proposed the "Vallon Amendment," a key element of the profit-sharing reforms under de Gaulle's government.

=== Political Philosophy ===
As a left-wing Gaullist, Vallon sought to transcend class struggle through worker participation in the economy. He opposed Georges Pompidou's conservatism and supported François Mitterrand in the 1974 and 1981 presidential elections, arguing that left-wing principles aligned with the true spirit of Gaullism.

=== Personal life ===
Vallon married Suzanne Braun, a Jewish ophthalmologist. During Vichy France, Vallon remarried her to protect her from racial laws.

=== Publications ===
- Socialisme expérimental (1936).
- Salaires et Niveaux de vie (1938)
- L’Histoire s’avance masquée (1957)
- La France fait ses comptes (1959)
- L'anti-de Gaulle (1969)
