= Democratic Union of Labour =

Democratic Union of Labour Union démocratique du travail
- Abbreviation: UDT
- General Secretary: René Capitant
- Founder: Louis Vallon; René Capitant; Jacques Debû-Bridel
- Founded: 14 April 1959; 67 years ago
- Dissolved: 10 November 1962; 64 years ago
- Ideology: Left-wing Gaullism; Labourism; Social corporatism Sovereignism; Progressivism
- Political position: Centre to centre-left

The Democratic Union of Labor (French: Union démocratique du travail, UDT) was a French political party founded in 1959 by left-wing Gaullists in the first years of the French Fifth Republic. Initially, it united activists for the independence of Algeria, and held a progressive stance on economic and social issues compared to the dominant Gaullist movement, the Union for the New Republic (UNR).

The party advocated for partnership between labour and capital, led by its general secretaries, René Capitant, and Louis Vallon. It formed the only left-wing movement that fully embraced the institutions of the Fifth Republic.

The UDT partnered with the UNR for the 1962 legislative elections and later merged with it to create the UNR-UDT, despite growing opposition among its members to Georges Pompidou, in the hope of establishing the left-wing faction of Gaullism.

== Press organ ==
The UDT published Notre République, edited by Frédéric Grendel. The publication stood out for its quality and vigor compared to the journal of the "official" Gaullist faction, La Nation.
