= Gaullism =

French political ideology

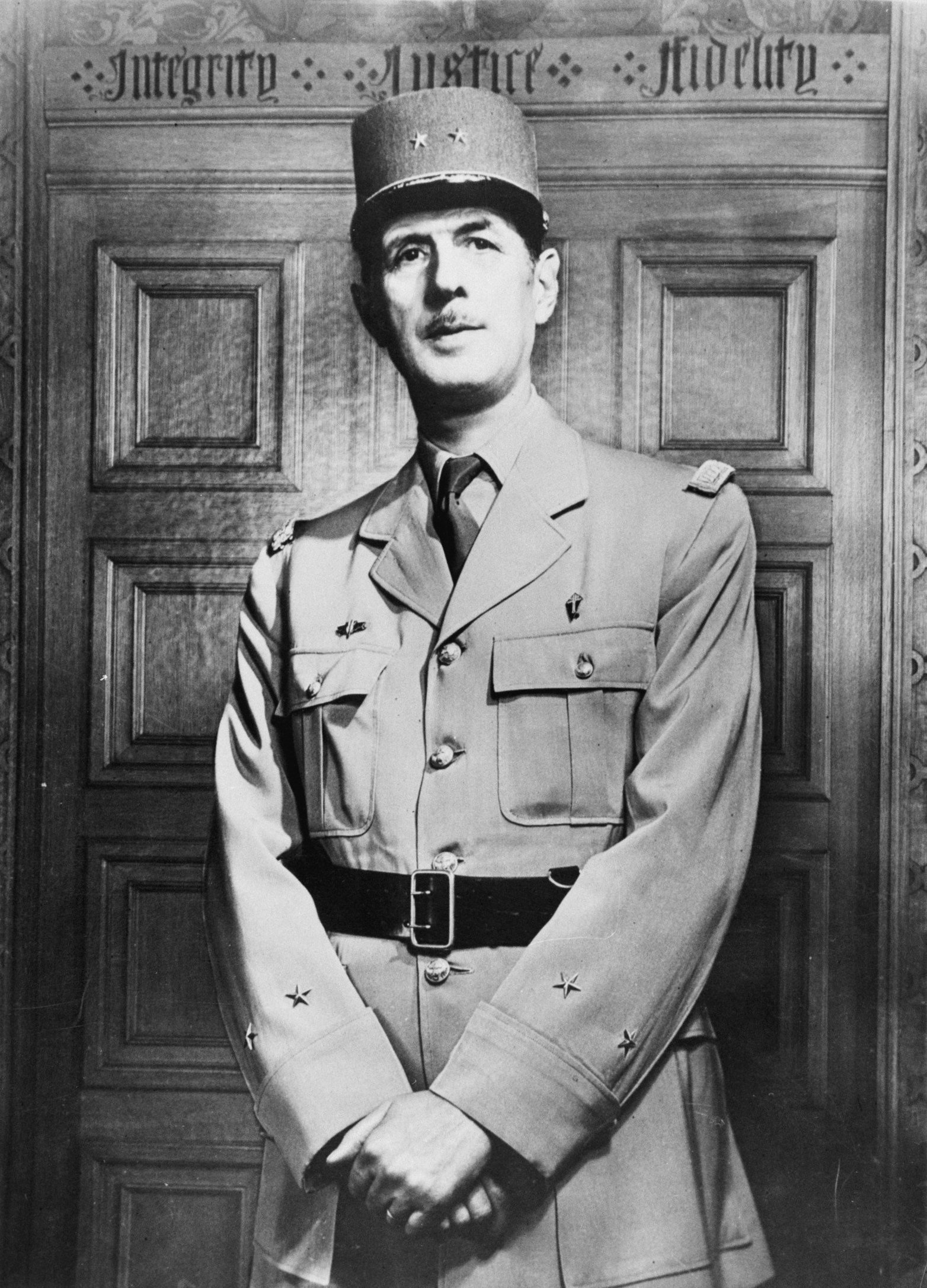
Charles de Gaulle, after whom Gaullism is named

Gaullism (French: Gaullisme [ɡolism]) is a French political ideology developed and created by World War II French Resistance leader Charles de Gaulle, who would become the founding President of the Fifth French Republic. De Gaulle withdrew French forces from the NATO Command Structure, forced the removal of allied (US) military bases from France, as well as initiated France's own independent nuclear deterrent programme. His actions were predicated on the view that France would not be subordinate to other nations.

According to historian Serge Berstein, Gaullism is "neither a doctrine nor a political ideology" and cannot be considered either left or right. Rather, "considering its historical progression, it is a pragmatic exercise of power that is neither free from contradictions nor of concessions to momentary necessity, even if the imperious word of the general gives to the practice of Gaullism the allure of a programme that seems profound and fully realised." Gaullism is "a peculiarly French phenomenon, without doubt the quintessential French political phenomenon of the 20th century".

Lawrence D. Kritzman argues that Gaullism may be seen as a form of French patriotism in the tradition of Jules Michelet. He writes: "Aligned on the political spectrum with the right, Gaullism was committed nevertheless to the republican values of the Revolution, and so distanced itself from the particularist ambitions of the traditional right and its xenophobic causes." Furthermore, "Gaullism saw as its mission the affirmation of national sovereignty and unity, which was diametrically opposed to the divisiveness created by the leftist commitment to class struggle."

Gaullism was nationalistic. In the early post-WWII period, Gaullists advocated for retaining the French Empire. De Gaulle shifted his stance on empire in the mid-1950s, suggesting potential federal arrangements or self-determination and membership in the French Community.

== History ==
Berstein writes that Gaullism has progressed in multiple stages:

- The flag of Free France with the Cross of Lorraine, a symbol of Gaullism
  The first phase (1940–45) occurred during World War II. In this period, Gaullism is identified with those French who rejected the armistice with Nazi Germany and the Vichy collaborators led by Philippe Pétain, and joined with General Charles de Gaulle and the Free French Forces, who sought to put France back in the war on the Allied side.
- In the second phase (1946–1958), Gaullism was a type of opposition to the Fourth French Republic. Gaullists in this period challenged the unstable parliamentary government of the Fourth Republic and advocated its replacement with "a president of the republic with preeminent constitutional powers."
- In the third phase (1958–69), "Gaullism was nothing other than the support given to the general's own politics after he returned to power in 1958 and served as president of the newly formed Fifth Republic from 1959 until his resignation in 1969."

Since 1969, Gaullism has been used to describe those identified as heirs to de Gaulle's ideas. The Cross of Lorraine, used by the Resistant Free France (1940–1944) during World War II, has served as the symbol of many Gaullist parties and movements, including the Rally of the French People (1947–1955), the Union for the New Republic (1958–1967), or the Rally for the Republic (1976–2002).

== Principles ==
=== Strong state ===
The "fundamental principle" of Gaullism is a "certain idea of France" as a strong state. In his War Memoirs, de Gaulle describes France as "an indomitable entity, a 'person' with whom a mystical dialogue was maintained throughout history. The goal of Gaullism, therefore, is to give precedence to its interests, to ensure that the voice is heard, to make it respected, and to assure its survival … to remain worthy of its past, the nation must endow itself with a powerful state." Kritzman writes that "the Gaullist idea of France set out to restore the honor of the nation and affirm its grandeur and independence" with de Gaulle seeking to "construct a messianic vision of France's historic destiny, reaffirm its prestige in the world, and transcend the national humiliations of the past." Accordingly, de Gaulle urged French unity over divisive "partisan quarrels" and emphasized French heritage, including both the Ancien Régime and the Revolution. The French political figures most admired by de Gaulle "were those responsible for national consensus—Louis XIV, Napoleon, Georges Clemenceau—who saw as their goal the creation of political and social unity by a strong state."

In order to strengthen France, Gaullists also emphasize the need for "a strong economy and a stable society." Gaullism believes, according to Berstein, that "it is the imperative of the state, as guardian of the national interest, to give impetus to economic growth and to guide it. Liberal opinion is accepted if it promises more efficiency than planning. As for social justice, so long as its natural distrust of big business can be allayed, it is less a matter of doctrine than a means of upholding stability. To put an end to class struggle, Gaullists hope to make use of participation, a nineteenth-century concept of which the general spoke frequently, but which he allowed his associates to ignore."

As part of a strong state, de Gaulle highlighted the necessity to found state institutions on a strong executive, contrasting with the French republican tradition, which emphasized the role of the elected assembly. During his time in office, de Gaulle sought to establish authority by holding direct universal votes and popular referendums and by directly engaging with the nation (via speeches broadcast over radio, press conferences, and trips to the provinces). Even though he frequently spoke on his respect for democracy, his political opponents perceived in his rule a tendency toward dictatorial power; many feared a Bonapartist revival or a republican monarchy. France remained a democracy, however, and de Gaulle's decision to step down as president following voters' rejection of the April 1969 constitutional referendum showed that his commitment to democratic principles was not merely a rhetorical ploy.

=== French exceptionalism ===
In foreign policy, Gaullists are identified with both realism and French exceptionalism, and de Gaulle sought to impose French influence on the global order. Gaullists supported decolonization, which freed France from the burden of empire. This was reflected in de Gaulle's resolution of the Algeria crisis (1954–1962), which was strongly influenced by de Gaulle's realpolitik, or "keen sense of political expediency." Realizing that decolonization was inevitable, and that a continued crisis and extended Algerian War would harm the French economy and perpetuate national disunity, "de Gaulle felt that it was in France's best interests to grant independence and desist from military engagement," thereby preserving French unity and grandeur.

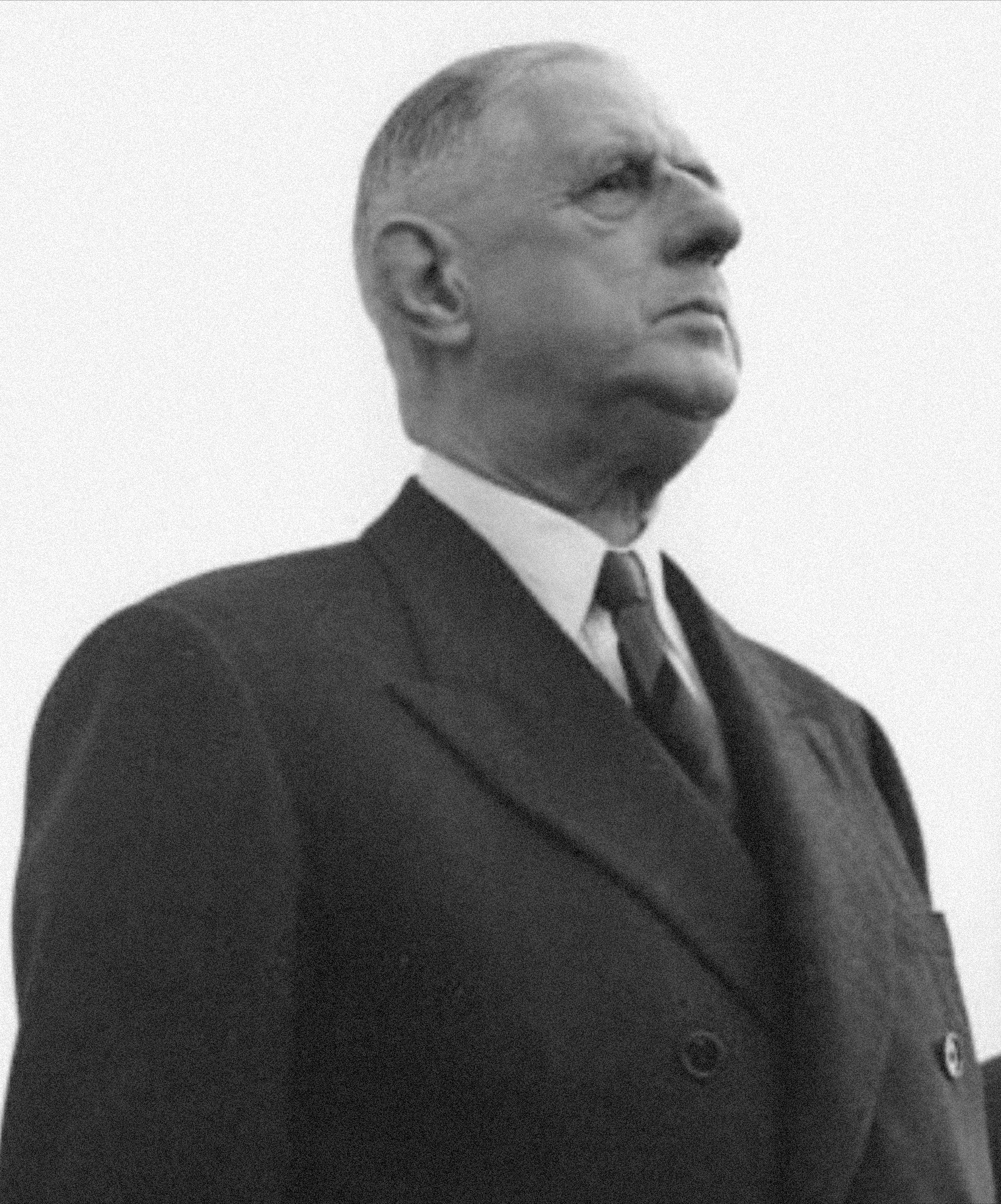
Charles de Gaulle in 1961, then the French president

Gaullists emphasize the need for France to "guarantee its national independence without resorting to allies whose interests might not coincide with those of France." The development of independent French nuclear capability, undertaken at significant effort despite much international criticism, was an outgrowth of this worldview. However, de Gaulle simultaneously initiated one of the first international nonproliferation efforts by quietly unshackling and distancing the French program from a diplomatically troublesome secret involvement with an Israeli junior partner, attempting to demilitarize and open to international oversight the Israeli nuclear arms program.

France under de Gaulle sought to avoid a post-World War II bipolar global political order dominated by the two superpowers of the United States and the Soviet Union, and sought to avoid dependence on the United States. Kritzman writes: "Gaullist foreign policy was motivated by its need to distinguish itself from … the two great superpowers. Paradoxically, [de Gaulle] desired to be part of the Western alliance and be critical of it at the same time on key issues such as defense." Most notably, de Gaulle withdrew France from North Atlantic Treaty Organization (NATO) military operations in 1966, and directed non-French NATO troops to leave France, although France remained a NATO member. Gaullists were also critical of the overseas economic influence of the U.S. and the role of the U.S. dollar in the international monetary system. Under de Gaulle, France established diplomatic relations with China earlier than most other Western nations; imposed an arms embargo against Israel (1967); and denounced American imperialism in the Third World.

De Gaulle and the Gaullists did not support Europe as a supranational entity, but did favour European integration in the form of "a confederation of sovereign states mutually engaged in "common policy, autonomous from the superpowers," and significantly influenced by France. De Gaulle's hopes to advance this sort of union largely failed, however, "in the face of the desire of the other European powers to remain closely allied to the United States."

== Political legacy after Charles de Gaulle ==
De Gaulle's political legacy has been profound in France and has gradually influenced the entirety of the political spectrum. His successor as president, Georges Pompidou, consolidated Gaullism during his term from 1969 to 1974. Once-controversial Gaullist ideas have become accepted as part of the French political consensus and "are no longer the focus of political controversy." For instance, the strong presidency was maintained by all of de Gaulle's successors, including the socialist François Mitterrand (1981–1995). French independent nuclear capability and a foreign policy influenced by Gaullism–although expressed "in more flexible terms"–remains "the guiding force of French international relations." During the 2017 presidential election, de Gaulle's legacy was claimed by candidates ranging from the radical left to the radical right, including Jean-Luc Mélenchon, Benoît Hamon, Emmanuel Macron, François Fillon and Marine Le Pen.

According to Berstein, "It is no exaggeration to say that Gaullism has molded post-war France. At the same time, considering that the essence of Gaullist ideas are now accepted by everyone, those who wish to be the legitimate heirs of de Gaulle (e.g., Jacques Chirac of the RPR) now have an identity crisis. It is difficult for them to distinguish themselves from other political perspectives." Not all Gaullist ideas have endured, however. Between the mid-1980s and the early 2000s, there have been several periods of cohabitation (1986–1988, 1993–1995, 1997–2002), in which the president and prime minister have been from different parties, a marked shift from the "imperial presidency" of de Gaulle. De Gaulle's economic policy, based on the idea of dirigisme (state stewardship of the economy), has also weakened. Although the major French banks, as well as insurance, telecommunications, steel, oil and pharmaceutical companies, were state-owned as recently as the mid-1980s, the French government has since then privatized many state assets.

== Currents ==
=== Traditional Gaullism ===
The term "traditional Gaullism" (Gaullisme traditionnel) has been used by scholars to describe the core values of Gaullism embodied by the actions and policies of Charles de Gaulle, generally in distinction with other Gaullist currents such as "social Gaullism" and "neo-Gaullism".

Resistant Gaullism (Gaullisme de Résistance) emphasizes the need for French political and military independence from potentially hostile powers, inspired by de Gaulle's role in the fight against Nazi Germany and Vichy France during World War II. The term "first-generation Chiraquian Gaullism" (Gaullisme chiraquien de première génération) has been used to describe politicians loyal to the populist stance and the opposition to European integration and the free market as initially advocated by Jacques Chirac in the late 1970s. This position was embodied in particular by Charles Pasqua and Philippe Séguin, who came to oppose Chirac's shift to neo-Gaullism during the 1990s.

=== Social Gaullism ===
Social Gaullism, or "left-wing Gaullism", focuses on the social dimensions of Gaullism, and has often been linked by scholars to social democracy. Opposed to the class conflict analysis of Marxism, which was perceived as a threat to national unity, de Gaulle advocated instead a "capital-labour association", that is the need for the direct participation of workers in their company's financial results and management, which he believed was a necessary condition for them to take an interest in its functioning and development. This aspect of Gaullism was promoted by the Democratic Union of Labour between 1959 and 1967, and by politicians like René Capitant, Jacques Chaban-Delmas, Jean Charbonnel, Léo Hamon, Philippe Dechartre or Jean Mattéoli. More recently, the Citizen and Republican Movement and Jean-Pierre Chevènement took up the banner of left-Gaullism.

=== Neo-Gaullism ===
"Neo-Gaullism" has been used in literature to describe a movement that emerged after the death of de Gaulle in 1970 and drew more influence from economic liberalism. Many aspects of neo-Gaullism, such as support for the Maastricht Treaty (1992) and French rapprochement with NATO under Chirac's presidency, have been described as difficult to reconcile with the historical idea of Gaullism. However, key components of Gaullism have remained, including the concept of a strong, independent state, the unity of the French people and references to de Gaulle's leadership. Neo-Gaullists have also conserved in some aspects the idea that France has a role to play in containing the world's "hyperpowers", as seen in Chirac's refusal to follow the US in the Iraq War in 2003.

Pompidolian Gaullism (Gaullism pompidolien) highlights the need for France to adapt its economy in an increasingly competing world that may threaten social peace at home, in the legacy of French president Georges Pompidou (1969–1974). "Second-generation Chiraquian Gaullism" (or "Chiraquian neo-Gaullism"), which emerged in the mid-1980s, has been influenced by neoliberalism and is more open to European integration, in the legacy of French president Jacques Chirac (1995–2007). However during the 1995 presidential campaign, Chirac criticised the "sole thought" (pensée unique) of neoliberalism represented by his challenger on the right and promised to reduce the "social fracture", placing himself more to the centre and thus forcing Balladur to radicalise himself. Ultimately, he obtained more votes than Balladur in the first round (20.8 per cent), and then defeated the Socialist candidate Lionel Jospin in the second round (52.6 per cent).

==== Jacques Chirac domestic policies ====
After attending the École nationale d'administration, Chirac began his career as a high-level civil servant, entering politics shortly thereafter. Chirac occupied various senior positions, including minister of agriculture and minister of the interior. In 1981 and 1988, he unsuccessfully ran for president as the standard-bearer for the conservative Gaullist party Rally for the Republic (RPR). Chirac's internal policies initially included lower tax rates, the removal of price controls, strong punishment for crime and terrorism, and business privatisation.

After pursuing these policies in his second term as prime minister, Chirac changed his views. He argued for different economic policies and was elected president in 1995, with 52.6% of the vote in the second round, beating Socialist Lionel Jospin, after campaigning on a platform of healing the "social rift" (fracture sociale). Chirac's economic policies, based on dirigisme, allowing for state-directed investment, stood in opposition to the laissez-faire policies of the United Kingdom under the ministries of Margaret Thatcher and John Major, which Chirac described as "Anglo-Saxon ultraliberalism".

== History ==
In France, the term Gaullist Party is usually used to refer to the largest party professing to be Gaullist. Gaullism claims to transcend the left–right divide in a similar way to populist republican parties elsewhere such as Fianna Fáil in Republic of Ireland, the Justicialist Party in Argentina, and the African National Congress in South Africa.

In the past, some Gaullist voters saw themselves as leaning towards the political left, a view ascribed to the once-leading Gaullist André Malraux. Most of Charles de Gaulle's own followers leaned towards the political right, christian democratic or national conservative. Consequently, left-leaning voters started showing less support again after Malraux's death in 1976, as figures of the Gaullist left (like Jacques Chaban-Delmas) were gradually marginalised. Under its various names and acronyms, the Gaullist Party has been the dominant organisation of the French right since the beginning of the Fifth Republic (1958).

=== De Gaulle vs. the parties (1944–1947) ===
Author of the L'Appel of 18 June 1940, and founder and leader of the Free French Forces, General Charles de Gaulle is the symbol of the French Resistance to the Nazi occupation and the Vichy government. Yet, based in London, then in Algiers, he was forced to compromise with the domestic Resistance movements dominated by various political forces (such as the Communists). In 1944, while France was liberated, de Gaulle presided over the provisional government composed of Communists, Socialists, and Christian Democrats. Because de Gaulle refused to create a great political party unifying the non-Communist Resistance, a lot of parties re-emerged. The Christian democratic Popular Republican Movement (MRP) seemed to be the closest to de Gaulle.

The provisional government implemented policies inspired by the programme of the National Council of Resistance: nationalization of banks and some industrial companies (for example Renault), and the development of a welfare state. However, it was divided about the way forward for political institutions and the constitution for the Fourth Republic. For de Gaulle, the "regime of the parties" that had characterized the Third Republic was a cause of the 1940 military disaster. He advocated a strong executive power, governing in the national interest, led by a man who was an incarnation of national unity. Indeed, in his mind, France is strong when it is united and the parties, represented in Parliament, serve particular interests and thus express national divisions.

In November 1945, a large majority of the French voters accepted the elaboration of a new Constitution. At the same time, they elected a new National Assembly. The French Communist Party, the Socialist French Section of the Workers' International (SFIO) and the Christian democratic MRP were the largest forces represented in this Assembly. It re-elected de Gaulle as president of the provisional government but, disagreeing with restoration of the "regime of the parties", de Gaulle resigned in January 1946.

In May 1946, a first constitutional law was rejected by referendum. One month later, a new Assembly was elected in order to write a new constitutional text. In his Bayeux Manifesto, de Gaulle outlined his institutional ideas but he was accused of wanting re-establish a Bonapartist government. Furthermore, without the support of a political force, he could not influence the constitutional law being prepared. René Capitant founded a Gaullist Union for the Fourth Republic but it could not prevent the approval of the text prepared by the elected National Assembly, which restored the parliamentary system.

=== Gaullist party and Fourth Republic: opposition and desert crossing (1947–1958) ===
In 1947, he gathered the anti-Communist opposition in the Rally of the French People (Rassemblement du peuple français or RPF). He accused the Fourth Republic of being dominated by the "parliamentary fiddles" and to organize the state helplessness. In keeping with its strongly nationalist stance, it accused the French Communist Party of being a vassal of the Soviet Union. Furthermore, it denounced what it called the "abandonment" of colonies by the Third Force cabinets, and it viewed French participation in the European Economic Community to be a threat to the nation. In addition, the Gaullists recommended an association between capital and labour in order to end the "struggle of classes", which hampered national unity.

Six months after its founding, membership of the RPF reached one million. It took control of the executive of many cities, including Paris, Marseille and Bordeaux. After the 1951 legislative election, despite the change to the ballot system, the RPF formed the largest parliamentary group of the National Assembly but had a systematic opposition.

In 1952, some RPF deputies voted in favour of Antoine Pinay's cabinet then joined the majority, against the instructions of de Gaulle. They left the RPF parliamentary group. More and more divided, the RPF suffered a significant decrease in support in the 1953 local elections. On 6 May 1953, de Gaulle asked to the Gaullist deputies to abandon the name "RPF". One month later, 5 Gaullist deputies joined Joseph Laniel's government. Indeed, they participated to right-wing majorities then, a part of the Gaullists as Jacques Chaban-Delmas joined the centre-left Republican Front under the label National Centre of Social Republicans (Centre national des républicains sociaux or CNRS).

At the end of the 1950s, the Fourth Republic floundered in the Algerian War. The 13 May 1958 crisis led to turmoil, and a threat of military coup was brandished. Emissaries sent by de Gaulle such as Jacques Soustelle participated in this bustle. The National Assembly accepted to call back de Gaulle to lead the cabinet. On 28 September, a new constitution was approved by referendum and the Fifth Republic was born. The parliamentary system was not questioned, but the presidential function was enhanced.

=== Gaullist party's height (1958–1976) ===
In order that he should not be faced with an hostile National Assembly, dominated by the parties (as was the case in 1945–1946), de Gaulle let his followers organize a political party, the Union for the New Republic (Union pour la nouvelle république or UNR). After the November 1958 legislative election, it became the largest force in the political system. It was allied with centre-left and centre-right parties to support de Gaulle, who was elected President of France by a congress of local and national elected officials in December 1958. Michel Debré was nominated as prime minister.

However, the change of Algerian policy divided the party. The chairman of the National Assembly Jacques Chaban-Delmas considered Algeria was a part of the presidential "reserved domain", as well as foreign and military affairs. Soustelle, leader of the pro-French Algeria faction in the party, left the cabinet in 1960, then was ejected from the UNR. He joined Georges Bidault at the head of the Organisation armée secrète which perpetrated terrorist attacks. After this crisis, the UNR appeared as the party of de Gaulle's unconditional supporters, hence its reputation of "boot party". Debré theorized its function of strap of the government. With de Gaulle refusing to be a party leader, Debré covertly took this position.

Meanwhile, the centre-left parties returned to the opposition in 1959, followed in 1962 by the centre-right parties, who criticized the eurosceptic declarations of de Gaulle and the "presidentialisation" of French politics. Indeed, de Gaulle instituted the direct election of the presidency, defying all political parties (except the UNR). The French voters approved this by referendum. De Gaulle had intended to replace Debré with Georges Pompidou as prime minister but this was denied by a vote of no-confidence. De Gaulle dissolved the National Assembly. Associated with the left-wing Gaullists of the Democratic Union of Labour (Union démocratique du travail or UDT), and allied with Valéry Giscard d'Estaing's Independent Republicans, the UNR won the 1962 legislative election and Pompidou was confirmed to lead the cabinet.

Naturally, the UNR/UDT supported de Gaulle's candidature at the 1965 presidential election. But he won only after a second ballot, which he considered as a disavowal. Relations became more difficult with the only non-Gaullist party in the presidential majority, the Independent Republicans, while the opposition was reconstructed.

While the Popular Republican Movement intensified its criticism, some Christian-Democrats, such Maurice Schumann, joined the Gaullist Party, renamed Union of Democrats for the Fifth Republic (Union des démocrates pour la Cinquième République or UD-V^{e}). Prime Minister Pompidou led the party during the 1967 legislative campaign. He encouraged the emergence of a new generation of Gaullist politicians who were loyal to him. The incumbent parliamentary majority only won a narrow victory.

One year later, Gaullist power was confronted with the social and student protests of the May 1968 crisis. Although the newly renamed Union for the Defense of the Republic (Union pour la défense de la République or UDR) triumphed at the June 1968 legislative election, disagreements had risen between de Gaulle and Pompidou. Pompidou reproached de Gaulle for leaving the country during the crisis without informing him. For de Gaulle, his aim of an alliance between capital and labour could prevent this sort of social crisis, but Pompidou wished to scrap it. Indeed, for de Gaulle's circle, Pompidou was more a classical conservative than a real Gaullist.

Pompidou left the leadership of the cabinet in order to prepare his future presidential campaign. In this, he declared his candidacy if de Gaulle were to resign. That was the case in 1969, after the failure of that year's referendum on Senate and regional reform, and he won the 1969 presidential election despite the reluctance of some of the "barons of Gaullism".

His prime minister Jacques Chaban-Delmas announced a reform programme for a "New Society". It raised sceptical reactions from the conservative wing of the UDR, then from Pompidou himself. They reproached him for giving too many concessions to the left-wing opposition. In President Pompidou's circle, he was accused of wanting to weaken the presidential functions in favour of himself. The party became the Union of Democrats for the Republic (Union des démocrates pour la République) while this crisis broke out. Pompidou refused Chaban-Delmas a vote of confidence in the National Assembly and, when he held it anyway, Pompidou forced him to resign and nominated Pierre Messmer. The UDR, allied with the Independent Republicans and Centre, Democracy and Progress, won the 1973 legislative election and succeeded in blocking the "Union of the Left" and its Common Programme.

When Pompidou died in office, on 2 April 1974, his two former prime ministers, Chaban-Delmas and Messmer, claimed the UDR candidacy for the presidential election. Finally, the latter withdrew, but some influential personalities in the party, notably in the circle of the late president, doubted of the capacity of Chaban-Delmas to defeat François Mitterrand, the representative of the "Union of the Left". Led by the young minister Jacques Chirac, a former adviser of Pompidou, they published the Call of the 43. They covertly supported Valéry Giscard d'Estaing, Minister of Economy and the Independent Republicans' leader. Giscard eliminated Chaban-Delmas in the first round, then narrowly defeated Mitterrand in the second. He was the first non-Gaullist President of the Fifth Republic.

Chirac became prime minister, and then leader of the UDR in December 1974, in spite of the negative opinions of many historical Gaullist personalities (Michel Debré, Jacques Chaban-Delmas, etc.). They accused him of having betrayed the party during the previous presidential campaign. Some months later, a conflict broke out between the executive leadership and Chirac left the cabinet in August 1976.

=== Chirac-led neo-Gaullist party: RPR and UMP (1976–2007) ===
In December 1976, the UDR was replaced by the Rally for the Republic (Rassemblement pour la République or RPR). This name was chosen due to its similarity with the RPF. Indeed, the New Gaullist Party was devised as a machine of reconquest behind one man, Jacques Chirac.

Without withdrawing from the presidential majority, the RPR criticized the executive duo of President Valéry Giscard d'Estaing and Prime Minister Raymond Barre. In December 1978, six months before the 1979 European Parliament election, the Call of Cochin denounced the "abasement of France" by "the foreign party", which sacrificed the national interests and the independence of the country in order to build a federal Europe. This accusation targeted clearly Giscard d'Estaing. The RPR contrasted the social doctrine of Gaullism to the president's market liberalism.

The RPR supported Chirac in the 1981 presidential election but he was eliminated in the first round. He refused to give instructions for voting for the second round, even if he said "in a private capacity", he would vote for Giscard d'Estaing. In fact, the RPR was suspected of working for the defeat of the incumbent president.

While the Socialist Party leader François Mitterrand became president, the RPR gradually abandoned the Gaullist doctrine, adopting the European and liberal positions of the Union for French Democracy (Union pour la démocratie française or UDF). The two parties competed for the leadership of the right-wing opposition, but they presented a common list at the 1984 European Parliament election and a platform to prepare for winning the 1986 legislative election.

From 1986 to 1988, Chirac "cohabited" as prime minister with Mitterrand, but lost the 1988 presidential election. After his defeat, his leadership was challenged by younger politicians who wished to renew the right. Furthermore, the abandonment of the Gaullist doctrine was criticized by Charles Pasqua and Philippe Séguin. They tried to remove him from the RPR leadership in 1990, in vain. However, the division re-appeared with the 1992 Maastricht referendum. Chirac voted "yes" whereas Séguin and Pasqua campaigned for "no".

The "Union for France", a RPR/UDF coalition, won the 1993 legislative election. Chirac refused to re-cohabit with Mitterrand, and his confidente Edouard Balladur became prime minister. Balladur promised he would not be a candidate in the 1995 presidential election. Nevertheless, polls indicated Balladur was the favorite in the presidential race and furthermore, he was supported by the majority of right-wing politicians. He decided finally to be a candidate against Chirac. However, they claimed they remained "friends for 30 years".

The Socialists being weakened after the 14 years of Mitterrand's presidency, the main contest was on the right, between Balladur and Chirac, two Neo-Gaullists. Balladur proposed a neoliberal programme and took advantage of the "positive results" of his cabinet, whereas Chirac advocated Keynesianism to reduce the "social fracture" and criticized the "dominant ideas", targeting Balladur. Chirac won the 1995 presidential election.

In November 1995, his prime minister Alain Juppé, "the best among us" according to Chirac, announced a plan of welfare state reforms which sparked wide social conflict. President Chirac dissolved the National Assembly and lost the 1997 legislative election. He was forced to cohabit with a left-wing cabinet led by Lionel Jospin until 2002.

Séguin succeeded Juppé as RPR leader. But, he criticized the ascendancy of President Jacques Chirac over the party. He resigned during the 1999 European election campaign, while Pasqua presented a dissident list to advocate the Gaullist idea of a "Europe of nations". Pasqua founded the Rally for France (Rassemblement pour la France or RPF) and obtained more votes than the RPR official list led by Nicolas Sarkozy. Michèle Alliot-Marie was elected RPR leader, against the wishes of President Chirac who supported another candidate.

Before the 2002 presidential election, RPR and non-RPR supporters of Chirac gathered in an association: the "Union on the move". It became the Union for the Presidential Majority (Union pour la majorité présidentielle or UMP) after the 21 April electoral shock. Chirac was re-elected and the new party won the legislative election. It was renamed Union for a Popular Movement a few months later, establishing the UMP as a permanent organization. In 2004, Sarkozy — Chirac's main rival — was elected the party's president. Chirac finished his presidency in 2007 after 12 years in power.

Sarkozy was elected president in 2007. During his leadership, the party shifted to the right with more conservative policies. Sarkozy was defeated in 2012. Despite his defeat, Nicolas Sarkozy remained influential in the party politics. He became again then President of the UMP in 2014 and renamed the party The Republicans in 2015. Sarkozy ran in the party's presidential primaries for the then upcoming 2017 election, but was defeated. Laurent Wauquiez was selected as leader in 2017. Since then the party has moved further to the right.

== Political parties ==
The following is a list of Gaullist political parties and their successors:

- 1947–1955: Rally of the French People (RPF)
- 1954–1958: National Centre of Social Republicans (RS)
- 1958–1962: Union for the New Republic (UNR)
- 1958–1962: Democratic Union of Labour (UDT)
- 1962–1967: Union for the New Republic – Democratic Union of Labour (UNR – UDT)
- 1967–1976: Union of Democrats for the Republic (UDR)
- 1974–1980's: Democrats Movement (MDD)
- 1976–2002: Rally for the Republic (RPR)
- 1993–2003: Citizen Movement (MDC)
- 1994–2018: Movement for France (MPF)
- 1999–2011: Rally for France (RPF)
- 2002–2015: Union for a Popular Movement (UMP)
- 2003–present: Citizen and Republican Movement (MRC)
- 2008–present: Popular Republican Union (UPR)
- 2008–2014: Debout la République (DLR)
- 2014–present: Debout la France (DLF)
- 2015–present: The Republicans (LR)
- 2017–present: The Patriots (LP)
- 2018–present: Citizen Movement (MDC)

== See also ==
- Foreign policy of Charles de Gaulle
- Vive le Québec libre

== Bibliography ==
- Berstein, Serge, Histoire du gaullisme, Perrin, Paris, 2001.
- Choisel, Francis, Bonapartisme et gaullisme, Paris, Albatros, 1987.
- Choisel, Francis, Comprendre le gaullisme, L'Harmattan, 2016.
- Gordon, Philip H. A Certain Idea of France: French Security Policy and the Gaullist Legacy (1993) online edition
- Grosser, Alfred. French foreign policy under De Gaulle (1977)
- Jackson, Julian. De Gaulle (2018) 887pp; the most recent major biography.
- Kritzman, Lawrence D; Reilly, Brian J (2006). "Gaullism". The Columbia History of Twentieth-century French Thought. Columbia University Press. ISBN 0-231-10791-9.
- Kulski, W. W. De Gaulle and the World: The Foreign Policy of the Fifth French Republic (1966) online free to borrow
- Touchard, Jean, Le gaullisme (1940–1969), Paris, Seuil, coll. Points Histoire.1978.
- Berstein, Serge (2001b). "Gaullism". The Oxford Companion to Politics of the World second edition ed. Joel Krieger. Oxford University Press. ISBN 0-195-11739-5.
