= Jean-Marcel Jeanneney =

French politician (1910–2010)

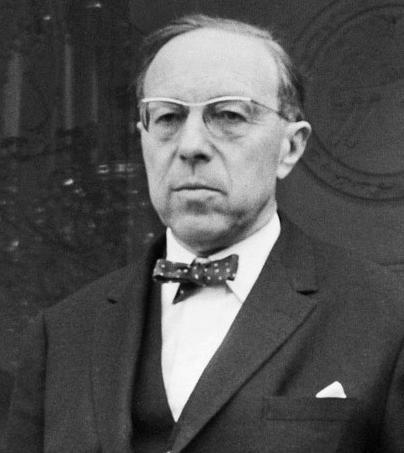

French Minister of Justice
- In office 28 April 1969 – 16 June 1969
- President: Alain Poher
- Prime Minister: Maurice Couve de Murville
- Preceded by: René Capitant
- Succeeded by: René Pleven

Personal details
- Born: 13 November 1910 Paris, France
- Died: 17 September 2010 (aged 99) Paris, France
- Party: UDR

Jean-Marcel Jeanneney (13 November 1910 – 17 September 2010) was minister in various French governments in the 1950s and 1960s, and France's first ambassador to Algeria in the immediate aftermath of the Algerian War. Born in Paris, he has been a professor of economics and is the founder of the Observatoire Français des Conjonctures Économiques (OFCE).

== Early life ==
The only son of Jules Jeanneney (a deputy in the National Assembly of France, president of the French Senate, and Minister of State in Charles de Gaulle's post-World War II provisional government), Jean-Marcel Jeanneney graduated in economics from the Paris Institute of Political Studies (better known as Sciences Po). He taught at universities in Dijon and Grenoble in the late 1930s.

== Early political career ==
Jeanneney was his father's Chief of Staff during the provisional government (1944–1946). In 1958, the younger Jeanneney was appointed by Jacques Rueff to the Rueff-Pinay committee, a group of experts on economic reform whose ultimate product, the Rueff-Pinay plan, lowered French tariffs, returned the French franc to full convertibility after re-evaluating it, and reformed financial markets.

Jeanneney was Minister of Industry in the Michel Debré government from 1959 to 1962, ending when he was appointed French ambassador and high commissioner to Algeria. He held this post for six months, immediately after Algeria gained independence from France. He served on a number of government committees between 1963 and 1966, and was Minister for Social Affairs from 1966 to 1968. Jeanneney was elected in 1968 to the National Assembly as a deputy for Isère, running with the Union des Démocrates pour la République and defeating the incumbent Pierre Mendès-France. He resigned his seat shortly afterwards to become the Minister Responsible for Senate and Regional Government Reform for a year.

From 1965 to 1989, Jeanneney served in a number of posts in local government in Rioz.

Jeanneney taught economics at the University of Paris I from 1970 to 1989, becoming a director at the French Fondation nationale des sciences politiques (National Foundation for Political Science). He founded OFCE in 1981 and was its president until 1989.

Jeanneney's son, Jean-Noël Jeanneney (born 1942), is a well-known French politician and educator.

Jean-Marcel Jeanneney died in Paris, France, on 17 September 2010 at the age of 99.

Political offices
Preceded by René Capitant	Minister of Justice; 1969	Succeeded by René Pleven
