= Jules Jeanneney =

French lawyer and politician (1864–1957)

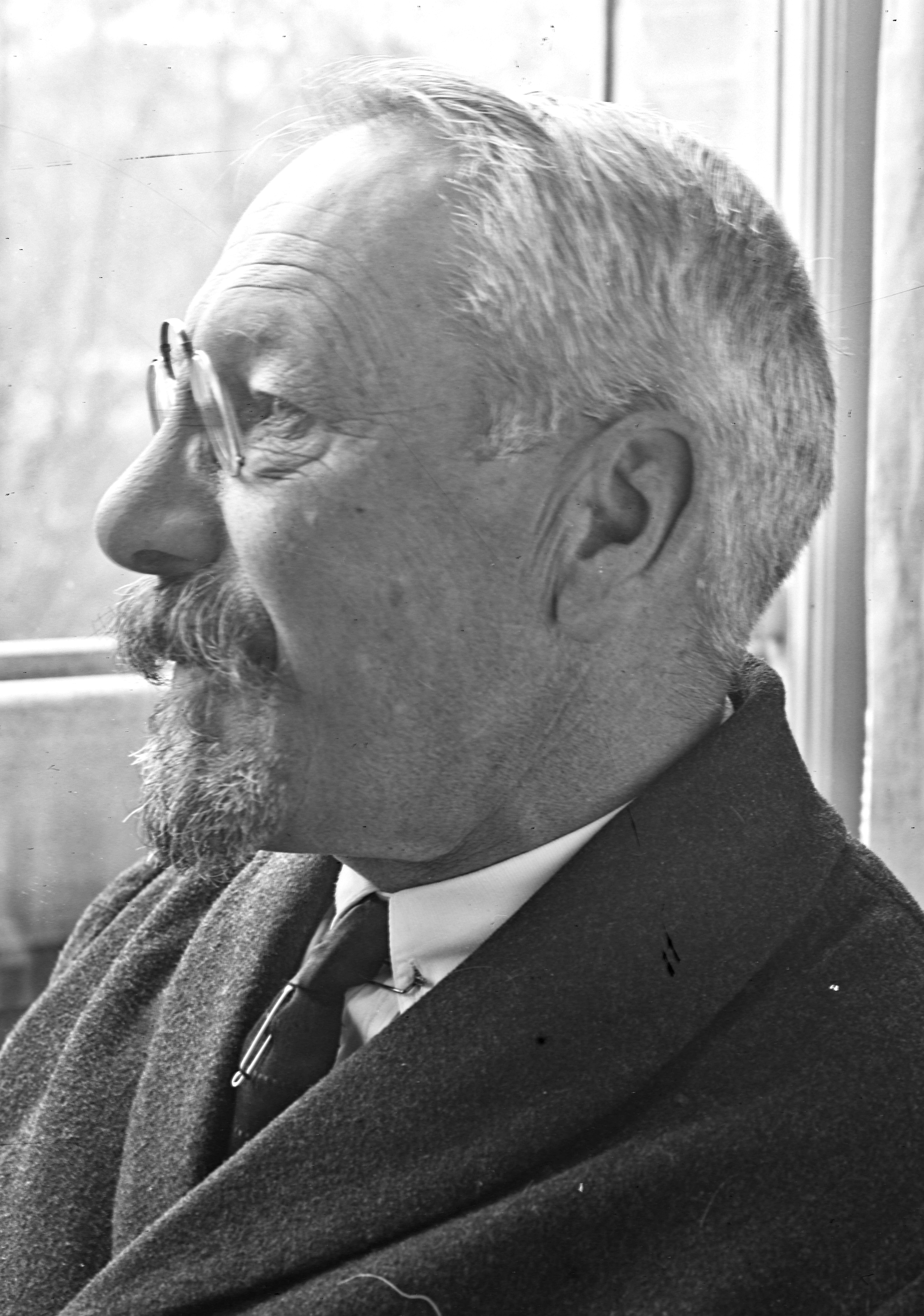
Jeanneney in 1924

Jules Émile Jeanneney (6 July 1864 – 27 April 1957) was a French lawyer and politician.

== Biography ==
Jules Jeanneney was born on 6 July 1864, in Besançon. His mother died soon after his birth, leaving his father, an auctioneer, to raise the child. Jeanneney said that he felt that his mother's death affected him greatly in later life. He studied law at the Sorbonne and practised as a lawyer.

At the urging of René Waldeck-Rousseau Jeanneney entered politics in 1897 when he was elected mayor of Rioz. In 1902 he stood in the elections to the Chamber of Deputies and was elected to represent Haute-Saône. In 1909 he was elected to the Senate where he supported the Democratic Republican Alliance. He would remain a Senator until 1944.

Jeanneney was elected vice-president in 1924, then he headed the important Finance committee until 1932 when he was elected President of the Senate to replace Albert Lebrun. As President of the Senate, Jeanneney led the debate on 10 July 1940 which resulted in the granting of extraordinary powers to Marshal Philippe Pétain and the creation of the Vichy Regime. Jeanneney accepted these results rather than seeking them and along with Édouard Daladier protested at the use Pétain made of his powers.

Jeanneney served as Minister of State with responsibility for reforming the administration in Charles de Gaulle's Provisional Government from 1944 to 1945. He died in Paris, on 27 April 1957, aged 92. after he died, a school was created at his name in rioz franche compté

Jeanneney's son Jean-Marcel Jeanneney and his grandson Jean-Noël Jeanneney were active in French politics.

== Bibliography ==
- (in French) Le Crédit agricole mobilier. Guillaumin, 1889.
- (in French) Associations et syndicats de fonctionnaires, étude législative. Hachette, 1908.
- (in French) (edited by Jean-Noël Jeanneney) Journal politique: septembre 1939–juillet 1942. Armand Colin, 1972.
- Jolly, Jean (1960). "Dictionnaire des Parlementaires français 1889-1940" (in French). Presses Universitaires de France.
