= Lawrence D. Kritzman =

American scholar of French and comparative literature

Lawrence D. Kritzman, an American scholar, is the Pat and John Rosenwald Research Professor in the Arts and Sciences, Edward Tuck Professor of French Language and Literature, and Professor of Comparative Literature at Dartmouth College. He has previously held the Willard Professorship of French, Comparative Literature, and Oratory and the Ted and Helen Geisel Third Century Professorship in the Humanities. He has written works on, edited works on, or given lectures on Barthes, Foucault, Kristeva, Sartre, Camus, Malraux, Derrida, Montaigne, de Beauvoir, and others, focusing especially on twentieth- and twenty-first century French philosophy and intellectual history. Drawing on psychoanalytic theory, he has innovated sixteenth century French studies in his readings of Marguerite de Navarre, Scève, Ronsard, Rabelais, Montaigne, and the poètes rhétoriqueurs.

== Education ==
Kritzman received a B.A. from the University of Wisconsin–Madison, an M.A. from Middlebury College, and a Ph.D. from the University of Michigan.

== Writing ==
His books include Destruction/Decouverte: le fonctionnement de la rhetorique dans les Essais de Montaigne, The Rhetoric of Sexuality and the Literature of the French Renaissance, and The Fabulous Imagination: On Montaigne's Essays. His book Death Sentences: Loss in Post-War French Writing is forthcoming. Kritzman has also penned articles for Le Monde.

== Editing ==
He has edited Fragments: Incompletion and Discontinuity; France under Mitterrand; Foucault: Politics, Philosophy, Culture; Le Signe et le texte; Sans autre guide; Auschwitz and After: Race, Culture and the Jewish Question in France; Pierre Nora's Realms of Memory; and Julia Kristeva's Passions of Our Time.

As editor of European Perspectives, a series in social philosophy and cultural criticism from Columbia University Press, he has served as a cultural ambassador between Europe and the United States and has published authors such as Adorno, Althusser, Barthes, Baudrillard, Baumann, Bourdieu, Cixous, Deleuze, Derrida, Ginzburg, Kristeva, and Vattimo. He serves on more than ten editorial boards in fields such as Renaissance and contemporary literatures, French society and politics, and theory and cultural studies.

His most recent editorial venture, the Columbia History of Twentieth-Century French Thought, was the winner of the 2006 Modern Language Association Scalgione Prize for the best book in French. This work also received awards from the Independent Publishers Association and the Ray and Pat Brown Foundation.

== Interviews and consultation ==
Frequently consulted on both sides of the Atlantic on French culture, politics, and intellectual life, Kritzman has been interviewed by Le Figaro, Télérama, Radio France, Liberation, Le Monde, La Stampa, The International New York Times, Newsweek, the Chronicle of Higher Education, The Boston Globe, and National Public Radio.

== Honors ==
In 1990, the French government made him a knight in the Ordre des Palmes Académiques; in 1994, he was made an officer; in 2019 he was made in 2018 he was made "Commandeur" —the highest honor awarded to an academic in France, and one that is only rarely given to scholars who are not French nationals. The order was first established by Napoleon I in 1808. Kritzman, a scholar of the French Renaissance, now holds all three of its ranks—Chevalier (knight), Officier (officer), and Commandeur. In 2000, he was awarded the Ordre National du Mérite, the second-highest civilian award accorded in France, by Jacques Chirac.

In 2012, he was named to the Legion d'Honneur, the highest honor that France bestows on a civilian, by French President Nicolas Sarkozy. Kritzman has received fellowships and awards from the American Council of Learned Societies, the Andrew Mellon Foundation, and the Florence Gould Foundation. In 2013, Kritzman was elected to the Societe d'histoire litteraire de la France. In 2006 he was given the Professor of the Year Award by the Dartmouth Student Assembly. He received the Jerome Goldstein Distinguished Teaching Award by vote of Dartmouth's graduating class of 2015.

== Institutes ==
Kritzman is founder and director of the Institute of French Cultural Studies. The major goal of the Institute of French Cultural Studies is to allow advanced graduate students and assistant professors in French to partake in contemporary cultural debates on both sides of the Atlantic and to prepare them to supplement the programmatic needs of French departments in developing courses in interdisciplinary studies taught in French.

He also heads the Institute for European Studies at Dartmouth. In the past, he has taught at Rutgers, Stanford, Harvard, and Michigan, and in 2010 was named Directeur d'Etude at the Ecole des Hautes Etudes-Paris. He was invited to teach at the University of Paris in 2016.
