= Jean-Noël Jeanneney =

French historian and politician

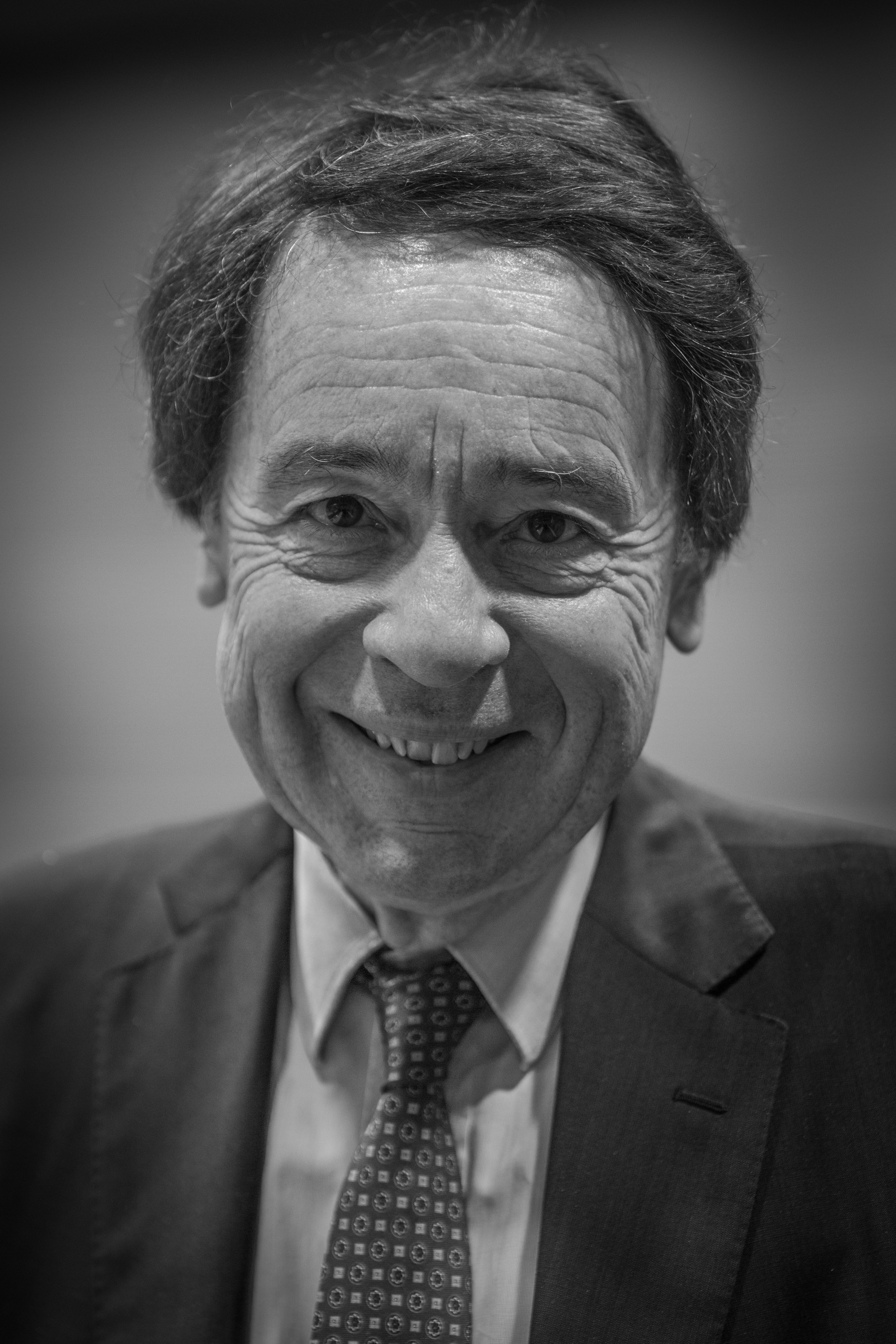
Jean-Noël Jeanneney, 2014.

Jean-Noël Jeanneney (born 2 April 1942, in Grenoble) is a French historian and politician. He is the son of Jean-Marcel Jeanneney and the grandson of Jules Jeanneney, both important figures in French politics.

== Education ==
After his secondary schooling in Grenoble, Jeanneney studied in Paris. Beginning at the rue d'Ulm campus of the École Normale Supérieure, he later studied at the Institut d'études politiques de Paris (IEP) (lit. "Paris Institute of Political Studies"). He earned his doctorate in letters and passed his agrégation (a competitive examination) in history.

== Media studies ==
Jeanneney specialized in media history, an area which he helped pioneer. He took interest in the evolution of print media (newspapers and periodicals), of radio, and of television. He taught at the University of Paris X: Nanterre until 1977. He was also named maître de conférences, and then, in 1979, professeur des universités at the IEP. It was there that he oversaw research on the history of the press.

== Involvement in radio and television ==
Jeanneney subsequently changed his focus, from external study to actual participation in mass media. Specifically, he was president and general manager of Radio France from 1982 to 1986 and afterwards worked in television, in particular for a history channel on cable television.

== Political career ==
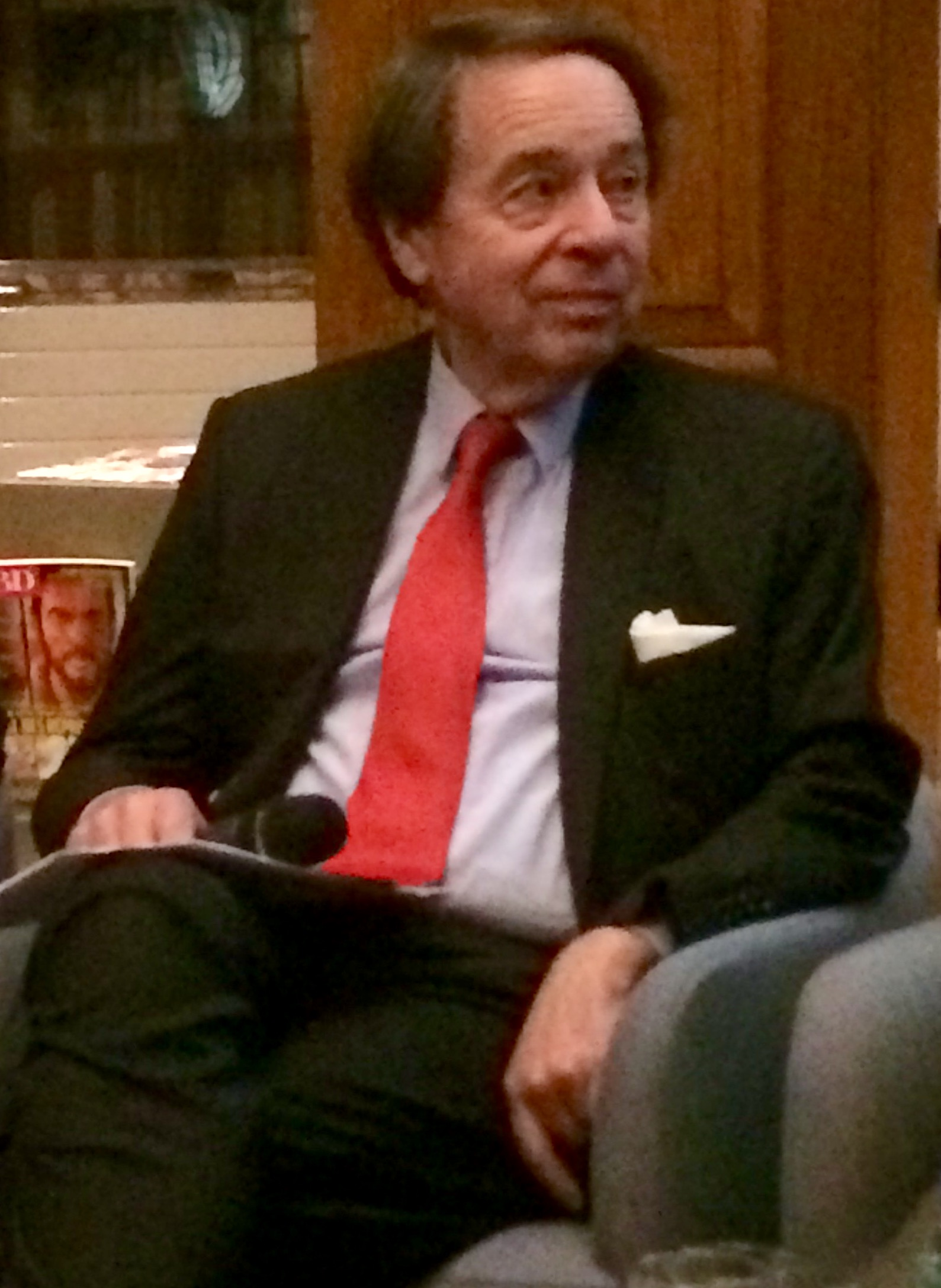
Jean-Noel Jeanneney at the French Institute, London November 2015

In politics, Jeanneney is very close to the Socialist Party.

- 1991–1992: junior minister of Exterior Commerce (under Prime Minister Édith Cresson)
- 1992–1993: junior minister of Communication (under Prime Minister Pierre Bérégovoy)
- 1992–1998: member of the conseil régional of the Franche-Comté région

With Élisabeth Guigou, he has been co-president of the think tank Europartenaires since 1998.

== President of the National Library of France ==
From 2002 to 2007, Jeanneney was president of the Bibliothèque nationale de France. In this capacity, he was noted for his opposition to Google Book Search. Since making his objections known, he has been looking to develop a European digitization program to be run by governmental authorities.

== Published works ==
Jean-Noël Jeanneney has published works on media history, other works of history, and essays on various subjects. He has written prefaces for several works, which are not included on the list.

- Jean-Noël Jeanneney, François de Wendel en république : l'argent et le pouvoir (1914-1940) [thesis], Seuil, Paris, 1976. ISBN 2-02-004410-2.
- Jean-Noël Jeanneney, L'Argent caché : milieux d'affaires et pouvoirs politiques dans la France du XX^{e} siècle, Fayard, Paris, 1981. ISBN 2-213-00947-3.
- Jean-Noël Jeanneney, Échec à Panurge : l'audiovisuel public au service de la différence, Seuil, Paris, 1986. ISBN 2-02-009238-7.
- Jean-Noël Jeanneney, Une histoire des médias, des origines à nos jours, Points, Paris, 1990 (republished 4 times). ISBN 2-02-052887-8
- Jean-Noël Jeanneney, L'Avenir vient de loin, Seuil, Paris, 1994. ISBN 2-02-022648-0.
- Jean-Noël Jeanneney, with Agnès Chauveau, L'Écho du siècle : dictionnaire de la radio et de la télévision, Hachette, Arte, La Cinquième, Paris, 1999. ISBN 2-01-235276-6.
- Jean-Noël Jeanneney, Le duel : une passion française (1789-1914), Seuil, Paris, 2004. ISBN 2-02-065383-4.
- Jean-Noël Jeanneney, Clemenceau : portrait d'un homme libre, Mengès, Paris, 2005. ISBN 2-85620-455-4.
- Jean-Noël Jeanneney, Quand Google défie l'Europe : plaidoyer pour un sursaut, Mille et une Nuits, Paris, 2005. ISBN 2-84205-912-3.
- Jean-Noël Jeanneney, Google and the Myth of Universal Knowledge: a view from Europe, translated by Teresa Lavender Fagan, The University of Chicago Press, Chicago and London, 2007. ISBN 0-226-39577-4.

=== Articles ===
- Quand le sacrilège était puni de mort en France (When Sacrilege Was Punished By Death In France), in L'Histoire, June 2006, pp. 68–72 (in French) (on the 1825 Anti-Sacrilege Act)

Preceded by Pierre-Jean Rémy	Président de la Bibliothèque nationale de France; 2002–present	Incumbent
