= Fernand Gambiez =

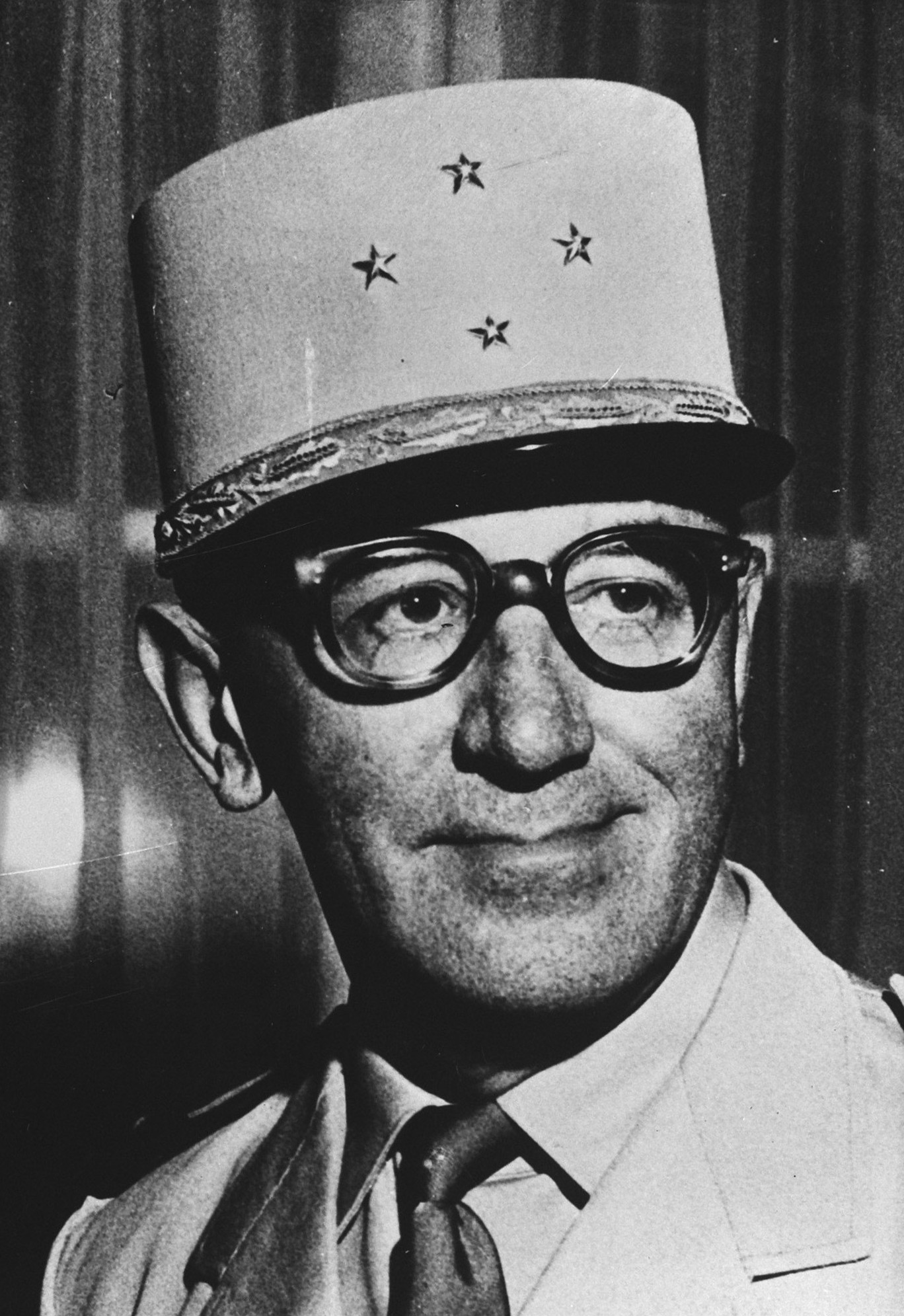
- Born: 27 February 1903; Lille, France
- Died: 29 March 1989 (aged 86)
- Military career
- Allegiance: France
- Branch: French Army
- Rank: Général d'Armée
- Conflicts: World War II; First Indochina War; Algerian War
- Other work: Historian

Fernand Gambiez (27 February 1903 – 29 March 1989) was a French Army general and military historian who fought in World War II, the First Indochina War and the Algerian War. During the Algerian War, Gambiez was commander-in-chief of the French Army in Algeria.

Gambiez was born in Lille, graduated from Saint Cyr in 1925. He served with the Foreign Legion in Morocco before studying at the Superior War School in 1935. He was a captain in command of a company during the Battle of France. He trained and commanded a Choc battalion in 1943, taking part in the fighting to liberate Corsica in 1944. Gambiez served as chief of staff to the French commander-in-chief Henri Navarre during the First Indochina War, including the Battle of Dien Bien Phu where one of his sons died.

He was promoted to Général de corps d'armée in 1958, commander of the Oran Corps in 1959, Inspector General of the Infantry in 1960 and finally commander-in-chief of the French Army in Algeria in 1961. He was arrested by the rebellious generals during the Algiers putsch in April 1961.

He was the director of the French military history commission from 1969 to 1989. He was also elected member of the Académie des Sciences Morales et Politiques in 1974.

== Works ==
- L'Épée de Damoclès, la guerre en style indirect (1967). With Colonel Maurice Suire.
- Histoire de la première guerre mondiale (2 volumes, 1968). With Colonel Maurice Suire.
- Libération de la Corse (1973)
