= Maurice Maunoury =

French politician

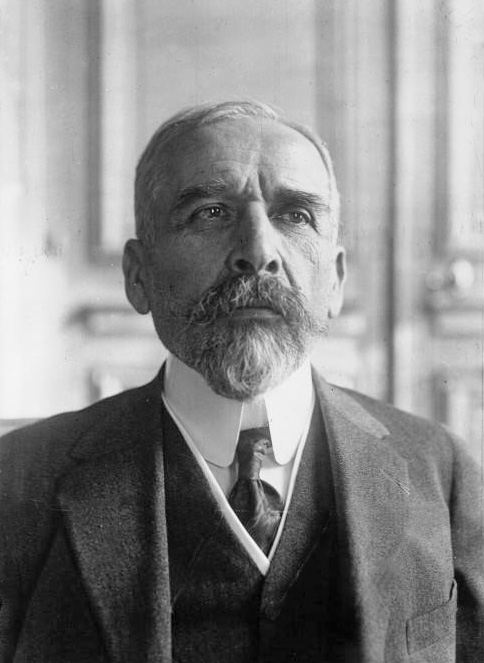
- Portrait of Maurice Maunoury

Député
- In office 1910–1924
- Constituency: Eure-et-Loir

Personal details
- Born: 16 October 1863 Alexandria, Khedivate of Egypt
- Died: 16 May 1925 (aged 61) Paris, France
- Party: GRD

Maurice Maunoury was a French politician who was born on the 16th of October 1863 in Alexandria (Egypt) and died on the 16 of May 1925 in Paris. He served as:

- Député for Eure-et-Loir from 1910 to 1924
- Minister of the Colonies from 9 to 13 June 1914 in the Alexandre Ribot government
- Minister of the Interior from 15 January 1922 to 29 March 1924 in the Raymond Poincaré government
