= Rioz =

- Commune
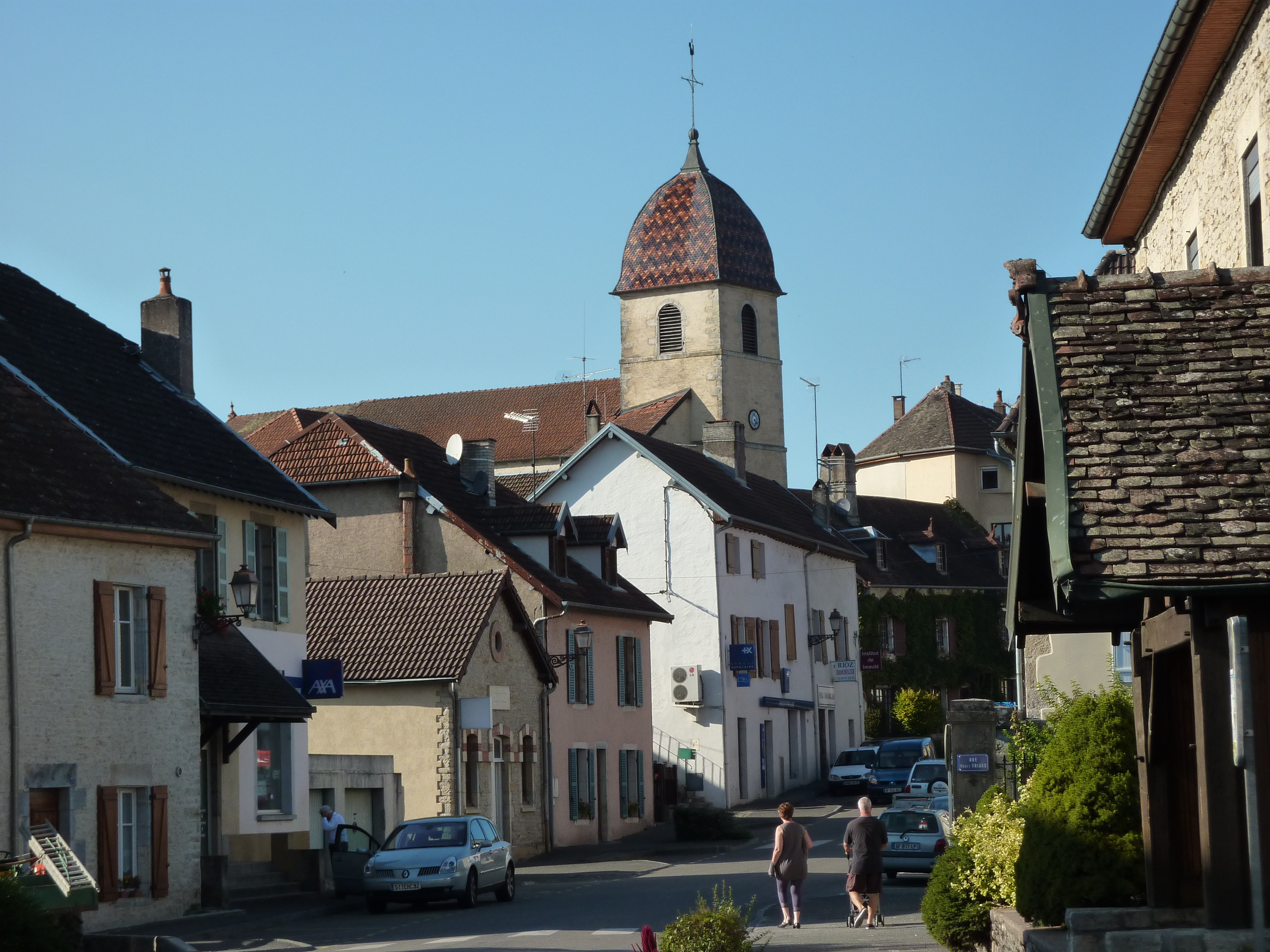
- The church and surroundings in Rioz
- Location of Rioz
- Location within France Location within Bourgogne-Franche-Comté
- Coordinates: 47°25′28″N 6°04′15″E
- Country: France
- Region: Bourgogne-Franche-Comté
- Department: Haute-Saône
- Arrondissement: Vesoul
- Canton: Rioz

Government
  - Mayor (2020–2026): Nadine Wantz
- Area^{1}: 17.20 km^{2} (6.64 sq mi)
- Highest elevation: 402 m (1,319 ft)
- Lowest elevation: 247 m (810 ft)
- Population (2023): 2,398
  - Density: 139.4/km^{2} (361.1/sq mi)
- Time zone: UTC+01:00 (CET)
  - Summer (DST): UTC+02:00 (CEST)
- INSEE/Postal code: 70447 /70190
- ^{1} French Land Register data, which excludes lakes, ponds, glaciers > 1 km^{2} (0.386 sq mi or 247 acres) and river estuaries.

Rioz (French pronunciation: [ʁjo]) is a commune in the Haute-Saône department in the region of Bourgogne-Franche-Comté in eastern France. Like in many regional toponyms, the "z" is silent in "Rioz". In 1973 it absorbed the former commune Les Fontenis.

== Population ==
Population data refer to the commune in its geography as of January 2025.

Historical population
Year	Pop.	±% p.a.
1968	683	—
1975	836	+2.93%
1982	889	+0.88%
1990	883	−0.08%
1999	1,134	+2.82%
2007	1,728	+5.41%
2012	2,004	+3.01%
2017	2,270	+2.52%
2023	2,398	+0.92%
Source: INSEE

== See also ==
- Communes of the Haute-Saône department
